= Killowen, Rockhampton =

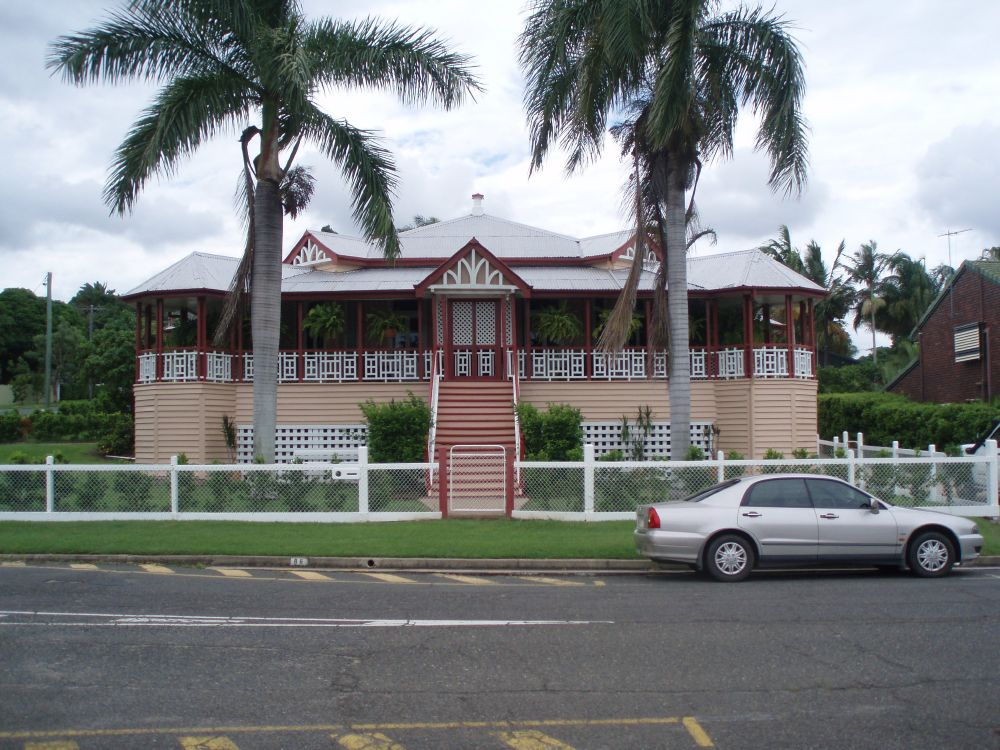
- Killowen, 2009

- Location within Queensland Location within Australia
- 23.3968°S 150.4951°E
- Location: 86 Ward Street, The Range, Rockhampton, Rockhampton Region, Queensland, Australia

History
- Design period: 1870s–1890s (late 19th century)
- Built: c. 1898–c. 1920

Site notes
- Architect: Eaton & Bates

Queensland Heritage Register
- Official name: Killowen, Boland Residence
- Type: state heritage (built)
- Designated: 21 October 1992
- Reference no.: 600819
- Significant period: 1890s–1920s (fabric); 1890s–1980s (historical)
- Significant components: residential accommodation – main house, pavilion, decorative features

Killowen is a heritage-listed detached house at 86 Ward Street, The Range, Rockhampton, Rockhampton Region, Queensland, Australia. It was designed by Eaton & Bates and built from c. 1898 to c. 1920. It is also known as Boland Residence. It was added to the Queensland Heritage Register on 21 October 1992.

== History ==
Killowen, a substantial, decorative, highest timber and corrugated iron residence, is believed to have been designed by architects Eaton and Bates, and constructed for Robert Cecil Boland in c. 1898. Killowen remained in the Boland family for many years, until the mid-1980s. RC Boland, a solicitor who came to Rockhampton in 1894 as a partner in the legal firm Rees R & Sydney Jones, reputedly named the house in honour of Baron Russell of Killowen (1832–1900), Lord Chief Justice of England, whom he admired.

Killowen is situated on The Range, west of the commercial centre of Rockhampton.

Very early in its history, Rockhampton showed class consciousness in advertisements for housing: there were two kinds, cottages and "gentlemen's residences". The cottages were usually in older streets close to the business centre, while more often than not, the address of a gentleman's residence was The Range. This abbreviation is still used for Athelstane Range on the western side of the city, a name derived from Mount Athelstane which was the home of William H Wiseman, Crown Lands Commissioner for the Leichhardt District, who built the first gentleman's residence in Rockhampton in c.1859. The now demolished slab and shingle house had an adjoining stone storage building which is still extant (Wiseman's Cottage).

Many prominent Rockhampton citizens built their homes on The Range, particularly in the vicinity of Ward and Agnes Streets. Allotments were sought for their panoramic views over the city and the lagoons to the west and for the cooling breezes they afforded. Building contractor and politician John Ferguson MLA built two impressive residences : Kenmore House (c.1894, now the Mater Misericordiae Hospital) and Killin constructed for his daughter, Catherine (1890, later the Yungaba Migrant Hostel), Other notable houses include the McDonald family's Clancholla (circa.1922) and the Rudd residence (c.1923). Boland's home, Killowen, typifies the villa residences constructed on The Range in the late 1880s and 1890s.

The 2 acres (0.81 ha) 32 perches (810 m^{2}) of land at the corner of Ward and Agnes Streets on which Killowen was constructed was originally part of a 24.28-hectare (60.0-acre) portion alienated from the Crown in 1859 by William John Brown, the Sub-collector of Taxes at Rockhampton. In the 1860s, Brown sold this property in three 20-acre (8.1 ha) allotments, the later Killowen site being included in the 20 acres (8.1 ha) transferred to Rockhampton solicitor Thomas Bellas. Subdivision of this land commenced after 1867. Boland acquired title to the Killowen site of 2 acres (0.81 ha) 32 perches (810 m^{2}) in July 1898, the allotment being reduced in size to 1 rood 15.9 perches (1,410 m^{2}) in 1900.

Originally Killowen was sited approximately thirty metres back from the Ward Street fence. This allowed for an entry avenue of palm trees and extensive gardens.

For nearly nine decades Killowen was the home of the Boland family. Robert Cecil Boland, born on 16 August 1867, was named after his Darling Downs birthplace, Cecil Plains. His early education was at Toowoomba Grammar School. Boland passed his final law exams in 1890 and that same year commenced as the Brisbane-based solicitor of the Rockhampton legal practice, Rees R & Sydney Jones. Rees Rutland Jones had arrived in Rockhampton in 1864, establishing a practice as one of six solicitors in a town with a population of approximately 3,500. The firm Rees R & Sydney Jones, established c.1886, became one of Central Queensland's most prominent legal firms.

Boland moved to Rockhampton in 1894 when he was accepted as a partner in Rees R & Sydney Jones. In c. 1898 he had Killowen constructed and two years later married Louisa Penelope McLeod of Clermont. They had two children, Russell Lazare born in 1901 and Cecil Clive born in 1903. In 1905 Boland placed Killowen in his wife's name.

The architectural firm of Eaton and Bates is thought to have designed Killowen. This partnership of George Thomas Eaton and Albert Edmund Bates, later with Arthur Beckford Polin, set up practice in Rockhampton c.1894. The firm established branch offices in six regional Queensland towns before moving their main office to Brisbane in 1902. Among their buildings in the Rockhampton area are the Lakes Creek Hotel, constructed in 1895 and Schotia Place (the former Rockhampton Markets) which opened in 1899.

Some of the best examples of the use of light timber battening with more substantial turned or sawn timber components, as in Killowen, are found in coastal Queensland towns such as Rockhampton. This detailing is characteristic of many Queensland houses, particularly those in northern latitudes. The use of lattice to separate the private from public areas of the house was functional as well as decorative. Its light construction not only provided comfortable shade and allowed the free movement of cooling breezes, it lifted the heaviness of the all-timber posts, balustrades, brackets and valances.

This residence is believed to have commenced as a four-room house with central hallway and verandahs. Renovations, reputedly undertaken in the early 1920s, enlarged the house and its verandah space. Louisa Boland went on an extended overseas trip in 1925–26, which provides some basis for the c.1920s date for the renovations. Two semi-detached and gable-roofed rooms at the rear may have been constructed at that time. Verandahs surrounding the four square plan typical of early Queensland houses were often narrow and not very functional. The introduction of wider verandahs accommodated more activities by providing de facto living space. It is not known which architectural firm undertook the c.1920s renovations at Killowen.

(Cecil) Clive Boland followed his father into the legal profession. Educated at Rockhampton Grammar School, he served his articles with Rees R & Sydney Jones and was admitted as a solicitor in June 1927. His father died four months later. The Morning Bulletin of 5 November 1927 described the funeral cortege as it moved away from Killowen as one of the largest and most representative seen in Rockhampton.

From 1928 Clive Boland took a leading role in Rees R & Sydney Jones. He served in the CMF and the Second AMF during the Second World War and afterwards concentrated on commercial work for local industrial firms, including Mount Morgan Ltd, the Central Queensland Meat Export Co. Ltd and Central Queensland Salt Ltd. Clive Boland continued to reside at Killowen during this time.

Louisa Boland died in 1949, following which title to Killowen was transferred to Clive, who married Lucy Eyrie Rule in 1954. In 1954, following Clive's marriage to Lucy Rule, Mr and Mrs Russell Boland, who had also been living in the house at the time, moved out. Lucy Boland recalls that her husband made changes to the rear of the house prior to their marriage. The couple resided at Killowen. Clive Boland was made a Commander of the Order of the British Empire in 1974 and died in May 1984.

As well at the contribution the Boland family made to the legal profession in Central Queensland, they were prominent members of the community. The men of the family had a long and active association with horse racing in Central Queensland. The Boland Administration Building at Callaghan Park Racecourse, Rockhampton, is named in honour of Robert Cecil, Russell Lazare and Cecil Clive Boland, who between them served as members of the Rockhampton Jockey Club Committee from 1895 to 1973. By the time Killowen was completed in c.1898, RC Boland was Chairman of the Rockhampton Jockey Club.

Killowen remained the property of the Boland family until the mid-1980s. In 1985 new owners subdivided the land further. At this time the house was moved on the site, closer to the eastern boundary. It is also at this time that servants quarters, at the rear of the property separate from the house, are thought to have been removed.

== Description ==
Killowen today is set on 1,386 square metres (14,920 sq ft) at the corner of Agnes and Ward Streets on The Range, west of central Rockhampton, one of the city's premier residential districts. The residence is single storey where it faces Ward Street with the sub-floor infilled at the rear. Constructed of timber with a corrugated iron roof, the high-set residence has been renovated at least twice, reportedly in the early 1920s and c. 1986 following subdivision and a relocation of the house closer to the Ward/Agnes Street corner.

The roofline is a complex of gables, hips and stepped verandahs, all clad in corrugated iron. Above the core of the original section of the building is a pyramid roof with a central metal ventilator. A brick chimney projects from a hipped section of roof to the north of the core pyramid. Two hip-roofed rooms are attached to the north-east and north-west corners of the building.

Killowen features verandahs on three sides: east, south (facing Ward Street), and west (facing Agnes Street). The front verandah faces Ward Street. At its south-east and south-west corners are octagonal verandah extensions. The distinct balustrade motif used accentuates the verandahs and their extensions. A similar motif, referred to in the 18th century as "Chinese railing", was incorporated into the entrance hall and balustrade of a house constructed in 1884 at Brighton, Victoria, for Dr Henry O'Hara. A less complex pattern was used on the John Mills' residence in the Brisbane suburb of Yeronga (c. 1914-15).

Central to the south verandah is the main staircase of approximately 2.2 metres (7 ft 3 in) width. This staircase is constructed of timber, including timber risers. At its base is a concrete pad impressed with the name Killowen. At the top of this staircase is a portico that extends 0.8 metres (2 ft 7 in) outside the line of the verandah and is supported by two stop-chamfered posts on each side. The portico features a projected flying gable incorporating frontispiece with timber fretwork, a design that is repeated in other projecting gables. The ceiling of the portico is VJ tongue & groove.

French doors from bedrooms and sitting rooms open onto the 2.8-metre (9 ft 2 in) wide eastern verandah which is enclosed by panels of wide horizontal and vertical slats and diagonal timber lattice. A horizontal lattice panel separates and secures this verandah from the southern or front verandah.

Symmetrical octagonal verandah extensions or pavilions are positioned at either end of the southern verandah. Each has a diameter of approximately 2.6 metres (8 ft 6 in). Their roofs are supported at each angle turn by double stop-chamfered verandah posts. Below the floor level of these extensions the walls are weatherboard to ground level. The walls below floor level elsewhere are a combination of weatherboard and horizontal timber lattice. The southern verandah is approximately 3.3 metres (11 ft) wide.

The front entrance to the residence consists of a dark-stained timber door with sidelights of coloured, textured glass. This door is not as ornate as that facing Agnes Street. Projecting approximately one metre into the verandah from the corner of each front bedroom room are rectangular bays from which French doors open to the verandah. Narrow, vertical windows with top panels of pastel-coloured glass form part of the short sides of these rectangular bay projections. The same glass colours (orange, lilac, green and blue) are featured here and in other sections of the house.

The second staircase for the residence provides entry to the western (Agnes Street) verandah. This staircase is constructed using pairs of short, capped posts which support capped timber stringers with no balustrade. Entry to this 3.3-metre (11 ft) wide verandah is through a recessed set of timber lattice doors. This verandah also features horizontal slats approximately 15 centimetres (5.9 in) wide and diagonal lattice. Above the three panels of lattice are elongated horizontal window frames enclosing small panes of coloured glass.

Entry into internal rooms can be made at four points along this verandah. The primary entry is through French doors between sidelights. The upper panels here feature leadlight in a simple Art Nouveau design. This pattern is also repeated in at least one internal door and fanlight inside the house. Both the east and west verandahs reduce in width towards the south verandah before opening out into the octagonal corner extensions. All three verandahs have VJ tongue & groove ceilings. Verandah wall framing is external and diagonally braced.

At the rear of the building are two semi-detached, gable-roofed weatherboard rooms. Each room has windows on two sides, protected by skillion-roofed, horizontally latticed sunhoods. The north-facing awning on the Agnes Street side also features a fretwork bracket. The end of each room has a flying gable with vertical infill in front of notched weatherboards.

=== Interior ===
The front door of the residence opens into a central north–south hallway from which rooms open east and west. Hallway walls are faced with horizontal tongue & groove while VJ tongue and groove is used elsewhere. Ventilating panels above doors are glazed, either clear or with a simple art nouveau design. Bedroom ceilings are VJ tongue & groove. Architrave corners are decorated with a circular moulding set into a square.

Directly to the north of the western bedroom is the only room in the house with a fireplace. This room features dark-stained timber and art nouveau glass panels in sidelight, fanlight and French doors. Immediately to the north of the eastern bedroom is a room which is lined to picture rail height with wallpaper of a striped floral pattern. Above this is plastered. In an interview in June 2004, Mrs Russell Boland recalled that a room referred to as the "blue room" was redecorated during her time in the house (1942–1953) and was the only room in the house that had wallpaper. The wallpaper in this room would date from that timeframe.

The ceiling in this room features a central rectangular plaster panel with flower and ribbon motifs. The wall between this room and the eastern verandah is heavily glazed with textured glass framed by dark-stained timber.

At the rear (north) of the house are dining and kitchen areas as well as a new sunroom and bedroom. A new doorway provides egress between the semi-detached room on the north-eastern corner of the house and the new sunroom. A new staircase with return allows entry to the under-house section at the rear of the house. An external door allows exit into the rear garden.

Single skin walls between verandahs and internal rooms are predominantly horizontal tongue and groove. Internal walls feature VJ tongue & groove. The ceiling height is approximately 3.6 metres (12 ft).

=== Gardens ===
The gardens of Killowen today echo the layout which existed prior to relocation of the building. Two large Cuban Royal palms (Roystonea regia) are located between the front gate and the main entry staircase. An octagonal aviary is placed in the same relative position on the Agnes Street side of the residence as one shown in an earlier, undated photograph. The timber and chain wire fence has been re-constructed, including the indentation into the allotment for the front entry gate, also of chain wire. At the rear of the house a railway carriage has been located in the garden' s north-eastern corner.

== Heritage listing ==
Killowen was listed on the Queensland Heritage Register on 21 October 1992 having satisfied the following criteria.

The place is important in demonstrating the evolution or pattern of Queensland's history.

Killowen is historically significant because it provides evidence of the evolution of residential development in Rockhampton during periods of economic boom.

The place is important in demonstrating the principal characteristics of a particular class of cultural places.

This substantial timber residence displays an abundant use of verandahs as part of the living space, alongside traditional and formal interior rooms.

The place is important because of its aesthetic significance.

Constructed late in the 19th century, Killowen is important because of its aesthetic significance, as well as for the contribution it makes to the residential streetscape of The Range.
