= List of royal visits to Rockhampton, Queensland =

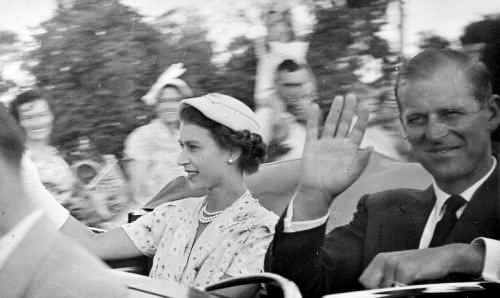
The Queen of Australia and her consort during their visit to Rockhampton, 15 March 1954

Members of Australia's royal family have made several visits to Rockhampton, Queensland, Australia.

== 1946: The Duke of Gloucester ==
Prince Henry, Duke of Gloucester visited Rockhampton on 12 June 1946. Although his wife Princess Alice, Duchess of Gloucester was scheduled to accompany him, she had to temporarily withdraw from the tour due to ill health.

Preparations for the Duke's visit began in April 1946, when Rockhampton mayor Henry Jeffries announced that the Duke, who was also serving as the 11th Governor-General of Australia, would visit Rockhampton with his wife. It was revealed that they would stay in Rockhampton overnight after they arrived on the afternoon of 11 June 1946. They would then depart the following afternoon. In a letter to Mayor Jeffries, the Duke's Aide-de-camp indicated that the Duke was looking forward to the visit as they had been disappointed that they'd been unable to visit the previous year.

After a public holiday had been gazetted for a national holiday on 10 June for Victory Day, it was reported Rockhampton City Council was attempting to secure permission to move local Victory Day celebrations from 10 to 12 June to coincide with the Duke and Duchess' visit. Mayor Jeffries said he was in discussions with Queensland Premier Ned Hanlon and Acting Prime Minister Frank Forde.

However, Forde confirmed in a telegram soon after that the request from Rockhampton City Council to stage Victory Day celebrations on 12 June 1946 was denied because it was impracticable due to the Commonwealth Government already proclaiming a national holiday for 10 June and would therefore be inappropriate to exempt one city from the general proclamation. Forde also stated that the Duke was already scheduled to attend Victory Day celebrations in Brisbane on 10 June, so it wouldn't be appropriate to ask him to attend similar celebrations two days later.

Although the proposal to move Victory Day celebrations was rejected, it was revealed that the Duke would present medals awarded to members of the armed services, or the next-of-kin of deceased members, during his tour of regional Queensland, with the ceremony in Rockhampton confirmed to take place on 12 June 1946.

It was reported on 10 June 1946 that Mayor Jeffries had received a telegram that advised that the Duchess of Gloucester would not be accompanying her husband in Rockhampton as she was suffering from a cold and had withdrawn from the Brisbane to Rockhampton leg of the royal tour on medical advice. It was said she hoped to re-join her husband in Mackay.

Prior to the Duke's arrival, Mayor Jeffries appealed to all employers in Rockhampton, particularly those who employed ex-servicemen and ex-servicewomen, to grant their employees a leave of absence from 10:30am until noon to enable them to partake in the civic welcome, the investiture of war decorations and the inspection of returned service personnel by the Duke.

The Duke of Gloucester arrived in Rockhampton on the evening of 11 June 1946, stepping off the Avro York aircraft, MW140, Endeavour at Rockhampton Airport at 5:25pm. Minister for Defence Frank Forde, State Treasurer James Larcombe, and Rockhampton Town Clerk Eric Bryant joined Mayor Henry Jeffries in the reception party to welcome the Duke to the city. Upon disembarking, the Duke expressed his regret about his wife's absence due to her cold and throat infection, but assured the reception party that her condition was improving. The Duke also remarked to the mayor that he noted the size of the city as he flew into Rockhampton on Endeavour, particularly with the layout featuring straight lines. Mayor Jeffries then accompanied the Duke of Gloucester to a special suite at the Criterion Hotel.

One of the first acts performed by the Duke upon arrival in Rockhampton was to dispatch a telegram expressing sympathy to Queensland Premier Ned Hanlon whose wife Elizabeth had died suddenly after suffering from pneumonia.

A civic reception was held at City Hall on the morning of 12 June 1946 where Mayor Henry Jeffries officially welcomed the Duke of Gloucester.

In his welcome speech, Mayor Jeffries welcomed the Duke and assured him of the pride the Rockhampton people had in the British Empire, the loyalty they showed for the throne, and the deep gratitude they had for the honour of the visit being conferred upon them. Mayor Jeffries explained to the Duke about the mining and pastoral activities that had helped develop the region and that he was in a part of Australia that had further potential, and was looking to support a larger population. The mayor said that there may be a time when the Duke's sons, Prince William and Prince Richard could visit Australia in the future and find Rockhampton to be a much larger city, because he trusted Central Queenslanders would never lose the sense of self-reliance and enterprise of the pioneers who had founded the district, ensuring further progress.

In his reply, the Duke of Gloucester said that his visit found the city taking up more tasks of peace with undiminished confidence in the future of Central Queensland, and that Rockhampton was barely past the threshold of development and expansion. He also said he was impressed with Rockhampton's hope that, when immigration was resumed, that every effort would be made to attract more people from the Mother Country. The Duke also said he realised that the people of Central Queensland regard the possibilities not as riches waiting to be picked up, but as a challenge to men and women with stout hearts and strong hands.

While at City Hall, the Duke of Gloucester signed the Visitor's Book in the mayor's office that had been instituted in 1909, simply signing the book "12.6.46 Henry".

== 1954: Queen Elizabeth II and the Duke of Edinburgh ==
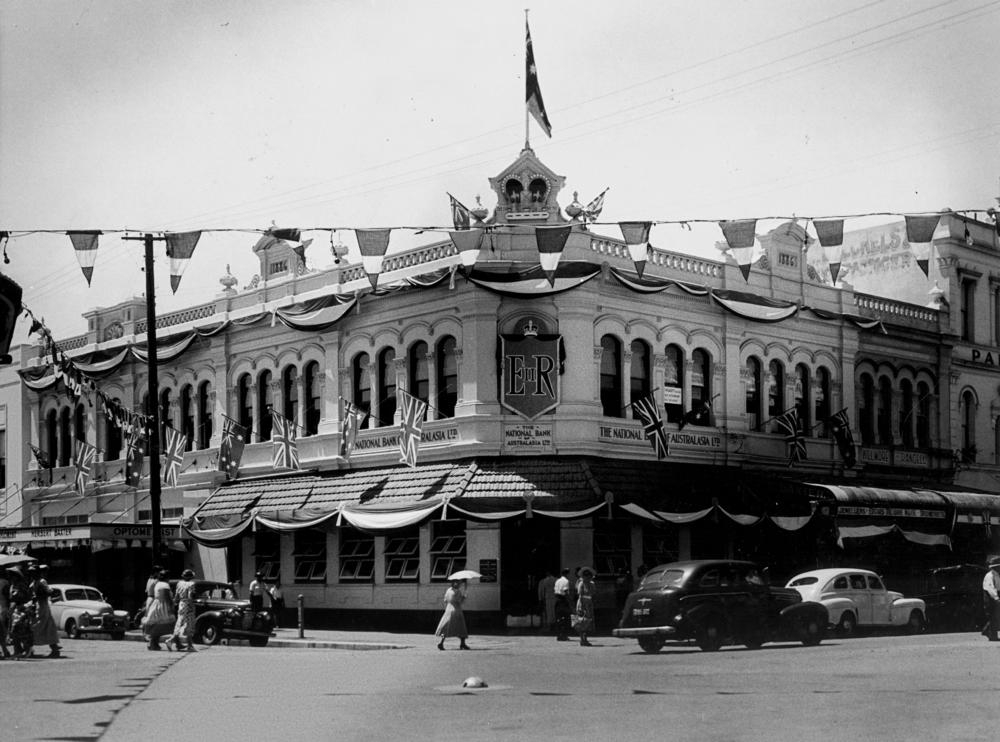
Rockhampton decorated with flags and bunting, as it prepares for the arrival of the Queen and the Duke of Edinburgh, 1954

Queen Elizabeth II and her husband Prince Philip, Duke of Edinburgh visited Rockhampton on 15 March 1954.

Plans for another royal visit to Rockhampton commenced in October 1951 when Minister in Charge of the Royal Visit Eric Harrison confirmed Rockhampton was included as a city that Princess Elizabeth and her husband the Duke of Edinburgh would visit during their royal tour of Australia in 1952.

In November 1951, the general committee of the Rockhampton Agricultural Society appointed a sub-committee to delegate with Rockhampton City Council on any matter regarding the royal visit. When the sub-committee was appointed, it was decided a special rodeo would be held on 26 and 28 April the following year to commemorate Princess Elizabeth's visit to Rockhampton.

The state director of the proposed 1952 royal tour arrived in Rockhampton in December 1951 to make arrangements for Princess Elizabeth and the Duke of Edinburgh's visit. It was announced that they were expected to arrive in the city on 28 April 1952 where they would meet with Rockhampton mayor Henry Jeffries and Queensland Premier Ned Hanlon, before proceeding to City Hall. A visit to Rockhampton General Hospital was also scheduled.

However, the death of Elizabeth's father, King George VI on 6 February 1952 resulted in the tour of Australia being postponed. It was eventually rescheduled and Queen Elizabeth II intended to make her way to Australia in 1954 with her husband, but this time as Queen instead of Princess, after she became the reigning monarch of the Commonwealth of Australia succeeding her late father. The Queen became the first reigning Australian monarch to set foot on Australian soil when she arrived in Sydney on 3 February 1954.

In 1953, it was announced that, subject to royal assent, the northern approach to the newly constructed Fitzroy Bridge would be called Queen Elizabeth Drive to commemorate the coronation of Queen Elizabeth II. Alderman Les Jones proposed during discussions about Queen Elizabeth Drive that it would be feasible for the Queen to be the first to travel on the road named in her honour during her visit.

In the weeks prior to their arrival, decorative displays began being erected all over Rockhampton, which included bunting, streamers, flags, banners, crowns, cyphers, coats of arms and decorative arches.

Buildings that were illuminated with colourful lights at night included the Rockhampton Post Office and the Glenmore Power Station which was lit up with a framed Royal Cypher. An illuminated kangaroo and lion on Williams Ltd in East Street also drew attention during the nights preceding the royal visit.

A fireworks display at the Rockhampton Showgrounds on 12 March 1954 signalled the start of week-long celebrations marking the imminent arrival of the Queen and the Duke of Edinburgh in Rockhampton. A street march featuring five marching bands paraded through city streets on 13 March 1954. A riverside carnival along the Fitzroy River on the night of 13 March 1954 was organised by the Rockhampton Spastic Welfare League. The carnival featured square dancing in Quay Street in front of Customs House and a concert on the corner of Denham and Quay Street. A free civic Royal Tour concert was held at the Wintergarden Theatre on 14 March 1954 and a grand Royal Tour ball was held in the School of Arts on 15 March 1954 where music was supplied by two orchestras.

Three Humber Pullman cars, two Humber Super Snipe cars, two Holden cars and one Land Rover arrived in Rockhampton by rail several days before the royal visit where they would be used as part of the Queen's motorcade. The vehicles were kept under police guard at Kingel Motors in Alma Street. The royal couple were expected to ride in one of the Humber Super Snipes.

The Rockhampton Ambulance Service moved to make assurances that they would be adequately prepared to deal with the minor casualties that were expected amongst the estimated 60,000 people that were expected to congregate along the route. Ten first aid posts were set up along the route and school teachers had been trained to use specific signals to attract medical assistance for children. The local fire brigade expressed concerns that the barricaded streets and the crowds would hinder a quick getaway for fire trucks should any outbreak of fire occur during the royal visit.

After months of preparation, Queen Elizabeth II and the Duke of Edinburgh arrived in Rockhampton on 15 March 1954.

A special commemorative edition of Rockhampton's local newspaper The Morning Bulletin was published. In an unprecedented move, the newspaper featured nothing on the front page except bordered photographs of Queen Elizabeth II and the Duke of Edinburgh, within a decorative illustration which itself was bordered which was accompanied by just one message, specifically addressing the royal couple's visit, which read:

With loyalty and affection, Central Queensland says: Welcome. This is our day. A happy and glorious page is about to be written in the history of Central Queensland. Now we join those other honoured cities and towns of Australia that have given personal welcome to our young Queen and her husband. Her Majesty will be with us but for a short time. In those few hours, however, we Central Queenslanders will show that our affection has its own special degree of warmth, and that our loyalty to the Crown is, as always, sincere and unswerving. Never before has there been such crowds; never before such a showing. But then, never before, has there been such a day. Rockhampton people – indeed the people of the whole Central Division, have put aside their recent worries and have made their gesture in the grand manner. On this page, we have attempted to represent the coming together of our Sovereign and us; combining the rose of England with the bauhinia, floral emblem of this city, in a frame for our greeting.

Special trains had been organised to bring people from the more remote parts of Central Queensland into Rockhampton for the royal visit.

When the Queen and the Duke arrived at the Rockhampton Airport, the royal party was met by Rockhampton mayor Rex Pilbeam and his wife, and the Minister for Health Bill Moore. The royal party consisted of Minister in Charge of the Royal Tour Eric Harrison, Queensland Premier Vince Gair and his wife Ellen, Lady Alice Egerton, Michael Adeane, Baron Adeane, Lieutenant-Commander Michael Parker and Wing Commander Michael George Cowan.

The royals proceeded to a civic reception at City Hall where Mayor Pilbeam officially welcomed them to the city.

In her reply to Pilbeam's welcome address, the Queen referenced the flooding that had impacted the Rockhampton area a month prior, saying she had read with concern of accounts of the recent flooding the area had experienced, and she sent sympathy to those affected by the disaster. The Queen said she hoped the damage could be quickly repaired. She thanked the mayor for his kind and loyal address and said that they had been fortunate to visit Rockhampton because they understood it was the pastoral and commercial capital of Central Queensland. The bells of St Paul's Cathedral and St Joseph's Cathedral in Rockhampton tolled in honour of the royal visitors, and both the Queen and the Duke of Edinburgh signed the same Visitor's Book that the Queen's uncle, the Duke of Gloucester, had signed in 1946.

The Rockhampton police inspector said that he had been the happiest man in Rockhampton upon his arrival back at the Rockhampton Police Station after the royal couple had departed, due to the well organised planning that ensured nothing awry occurred during the visit. He added that the public were to be commended on their behaviour and decorum during the visit. The only reported accident during the proceedings was when an 11-month baby was injured when hot tea was accidentally spilt on the baby's foot while a cup of tea was being prepared under the shade of a tree along the route. The baby was transported to a private hospital where its injuries were treated.

Three children were also reported as lost among the dense crowds and were taken back to the Rockhampton Police Station but were collected by their parents before nightfall. The more quirky sightings along the route included two men who had made periscopes to ensure they wouldn't miss seeing the royal couple as they motored past, and a woman who insisted on ringing a cow bell to welcome the Queen and the Duke.

The Queen expressed regret that they were unable to see a rodeo and asked Pilbeam to keep it in mind should the couple return to Rockhampton as she recalled an enjoyable time she had at a rodeo in Canada.

The chairs used by the Queen and the Duke at the civic reception were hand-carved in Louis XIV-style in Queensland maple, and upholstered in red velvet with gold monograms, and were manufactured by local company Tucker and Tucker. The firm confirmed that they would offer the chairs and matching table to the city as a gift.

== 1959: Princess Alexandra ==
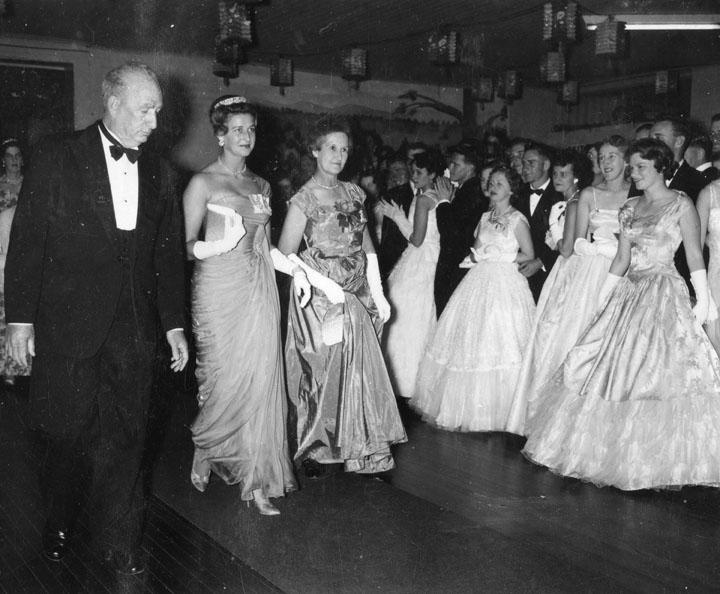
Princess Alexandra attending official function in Rockhampton, 1 September 1959

Princess Alexandra of Kent visited Rockhampton on 1 September 1959.

During her visit to the city, the Princess stayed at Clancholla Estate.

It was reported in the national media that during her tour of Rockhampton, she ordered her driver to stop the car when she spotted an elderly lady standing outside an aged care home with a bouquet of flowers. After motioning for her driver to stop, Princess Alexandra exited the car and walked back to greet the woman and receive the flowers.

== 1978: Princess Alexandra ==
Princess Alexandra returned to Rockhampton during a two-week tour of Australia in September 1978 when she officially opened the new three-storey library at the Capricornia Institute of Advanced Education (now CQUniversity) on 30 September 1978.
