= Schotia Place =

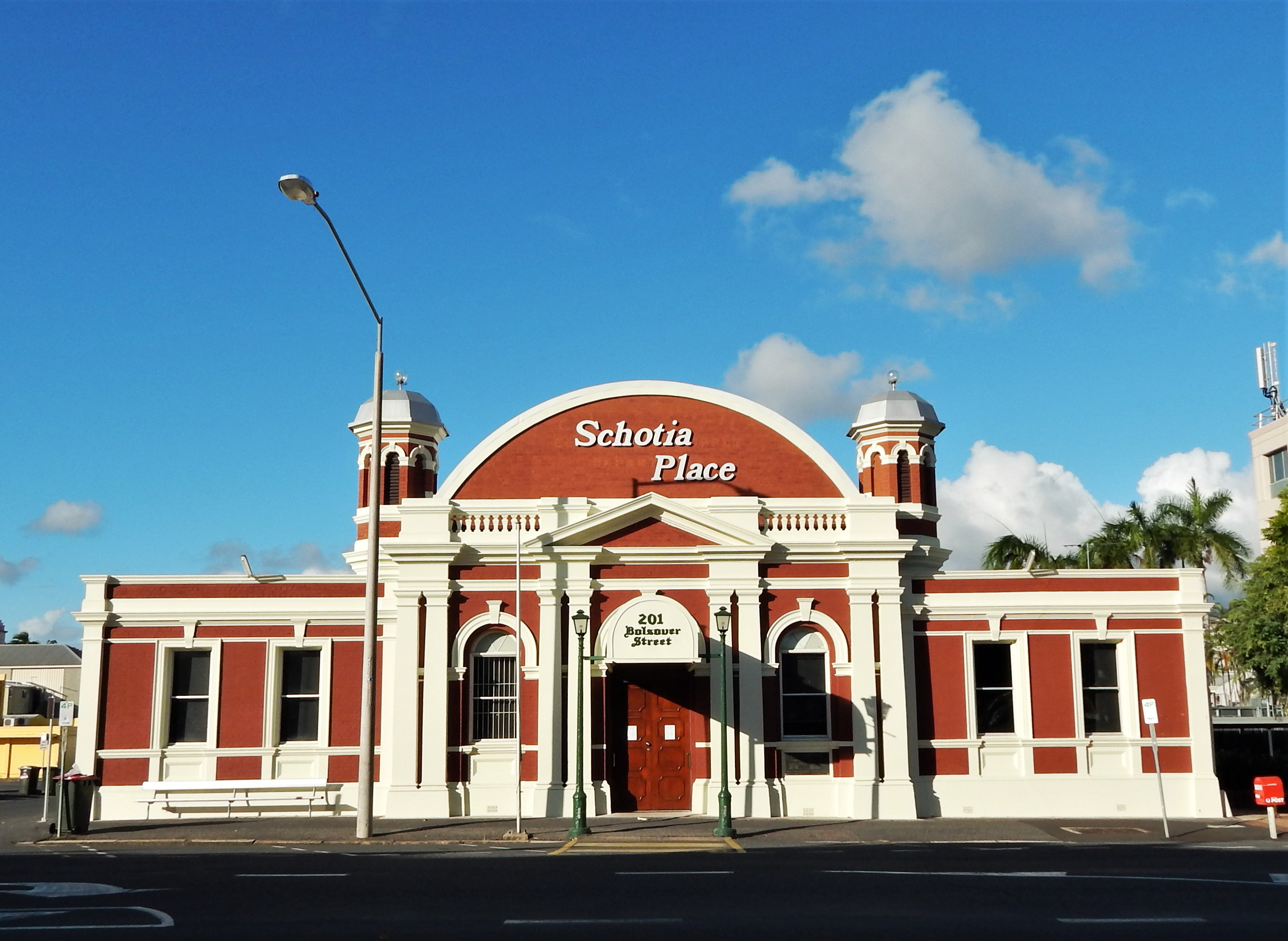
- Schotia Place, 2020

- Location within Queensland Location within Australia
- 23.3811°S 150.5144°E
- Location: 201 Bolsover Street, Rockhampton City, Rockhampton, Rockhampton Region, Queensland, Australia

History
- Design period: 1870s–1890s (late 19th century)
- Built: 1898

Site notes
- Architect: Eaton & Bates
- Architectural style: Classicism

Queensland Heritage Register
- Official name: Schotia Place, Rockhampton City Markets (former), Rockhampton Senior Citizens Centre
- Type: state heritage (built)
- Designated: 21 October 1992
- Reference no.: 600784
- Significant period: 1890s (fabric); 1899–c. 1920 (historical use); 1920s–1970s (City Council Utilities use)
- Significant components: shop/s, stage/sound shell, hall, tower

Schotia Place is a heritage-listed former market and now community centre at 201 Bolsover Street, Rockhampton City, Rockhampton, Rockhampton Region, Queensland, Australia. It was designed by Eaton & Bates and built in 1898. It is also known as former Rockhampton City Markets and Rockhampton Senior Citizens Centre. It was added to the Queensland Heritage Register on 21 October 1992.

== History ==
Schotia Place is a brick retail market building designed by architects Eaton and Bates for the Rockhampton Municipal Council. The building, which features twin cupolas and a barrel-vaulted roof, was opened on 18 April 1899.

Rockhampton was established on the Fitzroy River on land originally part of Gracemere, a pastoral property operated by the Archer family. Proclamation as a town occurred on 25 October 1858. The first sale of allotments was conducted the following month. A six-man council was elected in 1861, subsequent to the formation of the Municipality of Rockhampton on 15 December 1860.

Rockhampton's citizens first petitioned their Council for the establishment of a market in 1870. Land bounded by East, Bolsover and William Streets was designated a Market Reserve the following year. As the Council then lacked the funds to erect a suitable building, sections were leased for a period of fifteen years. Conditions applied to the type of construction allowed. In this manner it was envisaged that suitable buildings would be erected, while a fund for further development accrued.

The idea of a market for the sale of perishable goods was linked to the medieval concept of a designated day for buying and selling goods that were local in range and narrow in provenance. As open space areas with a free movement of people they became the centre of the community's commercial and social life. In England this form of market gradually was superseded by regional markets, where wholesale as well as retail trading was conducted. As transport and communication improved, metropolitan markets then developed. They featured the regular, contracted consignment of produce and wares to metropolitan factors or merchants. The Industrial Revolution introduced changes in marketing which led to the decline of the traditional, open market place.

Markets which served a public function were usually administered by trusts or corporations linked to local government. Although a temporary private market was established in the Queen's Wharf area of Brisbane around 1851, the city's first market trust operated from premises in Eagle Street between 1867 and 1881. Due to the inadequacies of the site it was not a great success. A new Brisbane market, more wholesale in style than retail, was completed in upper Roma Street in December 1884 and operated there until August 1964 when new premises were opened at Rocklea.

Markets also were established in other Australian capital cities and regional towns. As early as 1803, Sydney residents could purchase their supplies at a Saturday produce market in the vicinity of Circular Quay. Grocers nearby soon began to offer market foodstuffs for sale every day. After 1841 a market commission was established in Melbourne and premises sought. In general these markets, and the shops which clustered around their perimeter, provided everyday necessities for ordinary people. Melbourne's Queen Victoria Market, featuring single-storey buildings and open sheds, was established in 1878. A rebuilt "Eastern" market, which included a large hall, opened in Melbourne soon after. The Argus of 23 December 1879 reported that this building "provided ample accommodation for the requirements of every class of trade usually conducted in a market of this character".

Some large cities in the USA referred to the places where farmers' produce could be sold as Eastern markets. The Eastern Market in Detroit commenced in the 1850s as an open-air site. Its first sheds were constructed in 1891. The usefulness of the Eastern Market in Washington DC centred on its open-plan brick building, erected c. 1872. Until this latter market was rented out for the sale of other commodities, farmers sold their produce on stands inside the hall, spilling outside and on to the street.

From its proclamation as a Municipality in 1860, the Rockhampton district was well catered for by the commercial agents and merchants of Quay and East Streets. The larger mercantile companies were "universal providers". Their warehouses and shops stocked dry goods, wine and spirits and stock and station supplies including fencing and saddlery. The city's grocers, who in the 1890s numbered nearly forty, sold flour, teas and sugars in smaller quantities.

Twenty years after the initial request for a public market in Rockhampton, no proper structure had been built. In March 1891 the Rockhampton General Advertiser called for the expenditure of not less than £5,000 for markets which would suit the city's wholesale and retail requirements, noting in the same article the considerable amount of money which already had been collected through the lease of Market Reserve land. A new petition was presented to Council. Until matters were resolved, farmers sold their produce from a temporary facility, an old stable in Bolsover Street.

The firm of Eaton and Bates commenced design work for the new City Markets in 1896. This architectural partnership had set up practice in Rockhampton two years previously. George T Eaton and Albert E Bates, later with Arthur B Polin, established branch offices in six regional Queensland towns before moving their main office to Brisbane in 1902. Amongst their buildings in the Rockhampton area are the Lakes Creek Hotel and the Killowen residence.

At the request, and in the presence of the Governor of Queensland, Baron Lamington, Mayor Hugh Fiddes opened the new Rockhampton City Markets on 18 April 1899. That day the Governor observed that even Brisbane, then considered Rockhampton's key rival, did not possess a retail market.

Rockhampton's City Markets as a commercial venture did not survive much beyond two decades. Encroachment by other users was gradual. The Naval Brigade Office was located there in 1903, most likely in one of the offices facing Bolsover Street. Three years later stall-holders complained of the building being used by visiting entertainers during carnival week. An office for army recruiting opened in the front section of the building during the First World War. The City Markets also provided refuge for 200 people forced from their homes when early in 1918 the Fitzroy River rose a record 9.72 metres (31.9 ft), lapping the walls of city buildings and inundating the river flood plain.

The City Markets for local produce ceased around 1920. Their closure was in line with the general decline caused to public markets as retailing modernised and shoppers patronised the new department and cash and carry stores. The short trading life of this market in particular may also have been influenced by the city's pre-existing, well-established body of merchants, grocers and fruiterers, some with exclusive trade agreements with farmers.

In the mid-1920s the Electricity Supply Department of the Rockhampton City Council began a long occupation of what was then being referred to as the City Markets Building. Classes from the nearby Rockhampton School of Arts were conducted there in the following decade. By 1940 the red-brick offices and former market were referred to as the City Council Buildings. During the Second World War the covered open space proved useful to the US Army. After the war its occupation by government utilities continued. The building's survival as a rare example of a public market of the late 19th Century owes much to the adaptability of its internal space.

In the 1970s the Rockhampton City Council restored the former Rockhampton City Markets as a community centre for senior citizens. As a part of this substantial renovation, the new rear section of the building was added. An undated photograph from the University of Central Queensland's Capricornia Collection (MB126) reveals that in the past a fan-shaped pattern filled the curved gable on Bolsover Street and the barrel-vaulted roof covered a large area at the rear of the allotment. The large, barrel-vaulted roof was replicated during the renovation, while the pattern on the fan-shaped roof facade was possibly covered over. The Federal Minister for Health, Dr Doug Everingham, opened the community centre, renamed Schotia Place, on 15 November 1974.

In 2012, the building's facade was renovated at a cost of $140,000.

== Description ==
The Schotia Place allotment is bounded by Bolsover Street, and Market and East Lanes. The building consists of two main parts: a single-storey section addressing Bolsover Street that was built in 1898–99 and a large rear section built in 1974 that has single and double storey components. The front facade of the single-storey building sits opposite Rockhampton's Municipal Library and Theatre (formerly the Rockhampton School of Arts), and the Rockhampton Town Hall. The city's orthogonal grid is aligned to the Fitzroy River (which flows from the north-west to the south-east) and Bolsover Street is one of the main arteries. Schotia Place is on the southern edge of the central business district; the river is two blocks away to the north-east, and the central railway station three blocks to the south-east. The stretch of Bolsover Street in which Schotia Place is situated contains a high concentration of buildings of heritage significance. Apart from the two listed above, there are a further three that are included on Queensland's Heritage Register: the Rockhampton Technical College, St Andrew's Presbyterian Church, and the GS Curtis Stores. The Normanby Hotel is also located in this precinct of Bolsover Street, however it is only listed with the Australian Heritage Commission's Register of the National Estate.

Schotia Place, the front section of which was constructed using classical motifs, currently functions as a senior citizens' centre. The exterior walls to this section on Bolsover Street are built of reddish, sandstock bricks laid in English bond with white mortar, while the walls to the larger rear section are of dull coloured bricks laid in Stretcher bond. All are modelled to varying degrees with white cement render. The front facade to Bolsover Street is much more densely decorated than the remaining three. A large barrel vaulted roof, which reads on the front facade as a simple curved gable, acts visually as the building's spine. Three mechanical extract vents puncture its uppermost surface. Skillion roofs fall away from this structure to the three exterior parapet walls. All roofs are clad in corrugated Colorbond steel. Continuous lines of clerestory windows are positioned under each side of the vault, and at a matching level on the gable end facing East Lane and the north-east. The latter are louvred and their facade is also clad in corrugated Colorbond steel.

The front facade of Schotia Place is symmetrically arranged. Framing the curved gable (with rendered coping) are twin cupolas on short polygonal bases. The domes on these small towers are clad in faceted sheet metal and topped with globe lights. Each cupola face has a narrow, round-headed window in it. A pattern of horizontal lines is established by the stringcourse running below the dome, the window arches, keystones and imposts, and the sill and plinth mouldings, all of which are rendered. Positioned below the curved gable is the central section of the front facade, which stands slightly proud of the two equally sized facade sections flanking it. The central section is divided into three parts by four sets of twin Tuscan-style pilasters and is topped with entablature and parapet modelling in a similar vein. Above the central timber double door (approximately 2.7 metres (8 ft 10 in) high excluding its fanlight), the parapet line is interrupted by a simple pediment that is supported by pilasters. Each leaf of the double doors has four panels. On either side of the doorway are large, round-headed double-hung sash windows, which have render label moulds and keystones. A barrel-vaulted canopy clad to match the building's main roof extends over the footpath outside the entry door. This is a later addition, not evident in photographs from the first half of the 20th century.

Single pilasters frame the side sections of the front facade, which each contain two square-headed double-hung sash windows. The facade's plinth, pilasters, window and door frames, upper cornice-like stringcourse, and its coping are all modelled in white cement render. The lines of the plinth, upper stringcourse and parapet coping are carried through on the short, side facades that belong to this front section of Schotia Place addressing Bolsover Street. Their ends are made with pilasters modelled to match the others on the front facade.

The coping line of the parapet walls to the side and rear facades of the extension has been matched to an upper moulding line on the front section of the building. While a rendered plinth line has been created on these facades, its level does not match that of the front section. Its width diminishes over the gentle slope from East Lane to Bolsover Street. Rendered strips mark each line established by the heads and sills of the windows in these facades. The extent of render modelling has been greatly parred down, compared to the building's front section. Each of the long side facades- one addressing Market Lane and the other a paved and treed avenue- has three gated entry points. The first set is located adjacent to the front section of the building, while the other two sets divide the remaining facade areas evenly. On each facade, these two openings are framed by rendered pilasters and topped by a triangular rise in the parapet. A number of double-hung sash windows are set in the walls between the various entries. On the rear facade, in the northern corner, there is a double door accessed via a short flight of metal stairs and overhung by a small metal shade roof. There are also four louvred windows with high sill levels.

The main element of the building's interior, fitting under the barrel- vaulted roof, is a large hall incorporating a stage at its north-east end. To the side and rear facades, a single layer of small rooms surround this space on the ground floor and fit under the skillion roofs described earlier. This hall and surrounding rooms are part of the 1974 addition to the building. The entryway alcoves expressed on the side facades open directly into the hall. At the south-west end of the hall facing Bolsover St, there is a wide transition space separating the hall and a corridor beyond. This corridor lines up with the openings on the side facades closest to the building's front section, and separates the hall from the single layer of rooms fronting Bolsover Street. There are three of these disposed to each side of a central entry hall. The six rooms are occupied by a number of small retail outlets, a rest room, an office and a store. The corridor and these six rooms comprise the 1898–99 component of Schotia Place. Above the transition space from the hall and the rooms to each side of it, is a mezzanine level that fits beneath the barrel vault of the roof. This level has floors of polished timber boards and walls of plasterboard, with at least one large opening to the hall.

The floors to the hall consist of polished hardwood boards on a timber frame supported by brick or concrete stumps. Rather than matching the curve of the roof, the ceiling in the hall is faceted. It appears to be lined with plasterboard. The roof and ceiling are supported by an enclosed steel truss system. On the three sides of the vault there are long banks of clerestory windows. Beneath those on the side facades a curved lighting baffle has been installed. The lines where the vault and skillion roofs to the side facades meet are supported by single, centrally placed posts. Two square columns support this line at the rear of the hall and frame the stage. The walls of the hall also appear to be lined with plasterboard. The kitchen at the northern corner off the hall was refurbished in 1994 and fitted with new cupboards, stainless steel and laminated bench tops, stainless steel shelves and splashbacks, tile splashbacks and a new vinyl floor.

In the front rooms, entry hall and front corridor, the floors are made with timber boards lined with carpet. The interior walls to the front section appear to be plastered, and the ceilings are approximately 3.5 metres (11 ft) high. In the corridor separating the front and rear parts of the building there are bulkheads over each entry at about 2.7 metres (8 ft 10 in) in height, possibly housing air-conditioning ducts.

== Heritage listing ==
Schotia Place was listed on the Queensland Heritage Register on 21 October 1992 having satisfied the following criteria.

The place is important in demonstrating the evolution or pattern of Queensland's history.

Schotia Place, erected as a City Market by the Municipality of Rockhampton, is important in demonstrating the evolution of commerce in Queensland.

The place demonstrates rare, uncommon or endangered aspects of Queensland's cultural heritage.

The building is a rare example of a market building constructed to provide a dedicated venue for the retail sale of farmers' produce.

The place is important in demonstrating the principal characteristics of a particular class of cultural places.

The lofty, single-storey space with open plan to allow for stall arrangement, a principal characteristic of public markets of the period, was a feature of its construction.

The place is important because of its aesthetic significance.

Schotia Place also is important because of its aesthetic significance. The front part of the building facing Bolsover Street is a well-composed example of "free classicism" in which classical conventions are employed without a concern for academic correctness. This design attitude could be said to reflect the confidence with which Rockhampton's future was being envisioned. The facade of the front section of the building features a striking contrast between locally made red brick and painted cement render. The framing of the large curved gable by cupolas is also a distinctive design element.

The place has a strong or special association with a particular community or cultural group for social, cultural or spiritual reasons.

In both its early and recent history, Schotia Place has a special association with the community of Rockhampton. Built to serve commercial purposes as a public market, the site in the 1970s was renovated to become a community center for senior citizens.
