= The Range, Queensland =

The Range
- Suburb
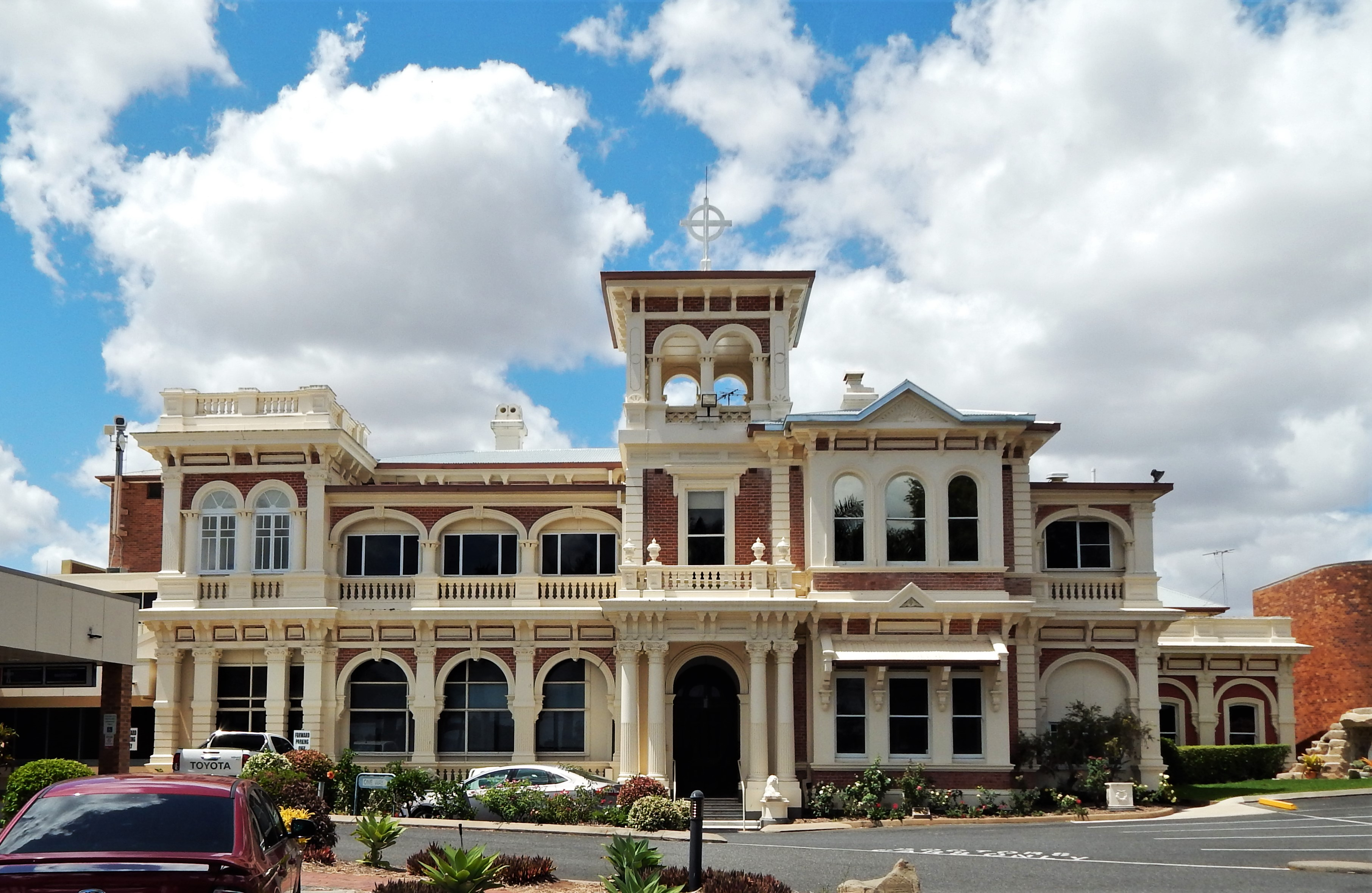
- Kenmore House, now the Mater Private Hospital Rockhampton, 1993

- Interactive map of The Range
- Coordinates: 23.395°S 150.4952°E
- Country: Australia
- State: Queensland
- City: Rockhampton
- LGA: Rockhampton Region
- Location: 2.0 km (1.2 mi) SW of Rockhampton CBD; 623 km (387 mi) NNW of Brisbane

Government
  - State electorates: Rockhampton; Keppel
  - Federal division: Capricornia

Area
  - Total: 3.6 km^{2} (1.4 sq mi)

Population
  - Total: 5,231 (2021 census)
  - Density: 1,453/km^{2} (3,760/sq mi)
- Time zone: UTC+10:00 (AEST)
- Postcode: 4700
Suburbs around The Range
Wandal	Wandal	Rockhampton City
West Rockhampton	The Range	Allenstown
Fairy Bower	Fairy Bower	Allenstown

The Range is an inner suburb of Rockhampton in the Rockhampton Region, Queensland, Australia. In the 2021 census The Range had a population of 5,231 people.

== Geography ==
The suburb is built on the Athelstane Range with Agnes Street approximating the ridge line.

== History ==
The suburb takes its name from the Athelstane Range, which was named in turn for Mount Athelstane, the name of the house built by lands commissioner William Wiseman circa 1859. Rockhampton's first water storage was built on the top of Governor's Hill (part of Atheltstane Range) in 1875.

Construction of Rockhampton Grammar School commenced in January 1880 and it was officially opened on 1 February 1881.

Rockhampton Girls Grammar School opened on 11 March 1892.

St Peter's Catholic Primary School was established by the Presentation Sisters and was officially opened on Sunday 28 January 1934 by Archbishop James Duhig.

The Rockhampton Flexible Learning School opened in 2015.

== Demographics ==
In the 2006 census, The Range had a population of 5,731 people.

In the 2011 census, The Range had a population of 5,369 people.

In the 2016 census, The Range had a population of 5,400 people.

In the 2021 census, The Range had a population of 5,231 people.

== Heritage listings ==
The Range has a number of heritage-listed properties, including:

- Rockhampton Girls Grammar School, 155 Agnes Street
- Rudd Residence, 248 Agnes Street
- The Range Convent and High School, 263 Agnes Street
- Rockhampton Grammar School, Archer Street
- Medical superintendent's residence, Rockhampton Base Hospital, Canning Street:
- Therapies Building, Rockhampton Base Hospital, Canning Street
- Amla (house), 49 Jessie Street
- Wiseman's Cottage, 30 Nathan Street
- Rockhampton War Memorial, Penlington Street
- Rockhampton Botanic Gardens, 100 Spencer Street
- Clancholla, 25 Ward Street
- Kenmore House, 31 Ward Street
- Yungaba Migrant Hostel, 74 Ward Street
- Killowen, 86 Ward Street

== Education ==
St Peter's Catholic Primary School is a Catholic primary (Prep–6) school for boys and girls at 170 Upper Dawson Road (23.39865°S 150.50112°E). In 2018, the school had an enrolment of 343 students with 22 teachers (20 full-time equivalent) and 14 non-teaching staff (8 full-time equivalent).

The Rockhampton Grammar School is a private primary and secondary (Prep–12) school for boys and girls at 53-89 Archer Street (23.3848°S 150.4945°E). In 2018, the school had an enrolment of 1343 students with 115 teachers (103 full-time equivalent) and 93 non-teaching staff (74 full-time equivalent).

Rockhampton Girls Grammar School is a private primary and secondary (Prep–12) school for girls at the corner of Denham and Agnes Streets (23.3885°S 150.4958°E).

Rockhampton Flexible Learning Centre is a Catholic secondary (7–12) school for boys and girls at 210 Upper Dawson Road (23.4015°S 150.5005°E). An initiative of Edmund Rice Education Australia, it provides individual programs for young people in the Rockhampton area who have disengaged from regular schooling. In 2023, the school had an enrolment of 84 students.

There are no government schools in The Range. The nearest government primary schools are The Hall State School in neighbouring Wandal to the north, Crescent Lagoon State School in neighbouring West Rockhampton to the west, Allenstown State School in neighbouring Allenstown to the east, and Port Curtis Road State School in Port Curtis to the south-east. The nearest government primary school is Rockhampton State High School in neighbouring Wandal to the north.

== Amenities ==
There are a number of parks in the area:

- Rockhampton Botanic Gardens (23.4010°S 150.4915°E)
- Georgeson Oval (23.3874°S 150.4912°E)
- Kellow Street Park (23.3820°S 150.4942°E)
- Kerr Park (23.3866°S 150.4991°E)
- Rugby Park (23.4062°S 150.4949°E)
- Voss Park (23.3776°S 150.4992°E)
