= Amla, Rockhampton =

House in Queensland, Australia, built 1952

Amla
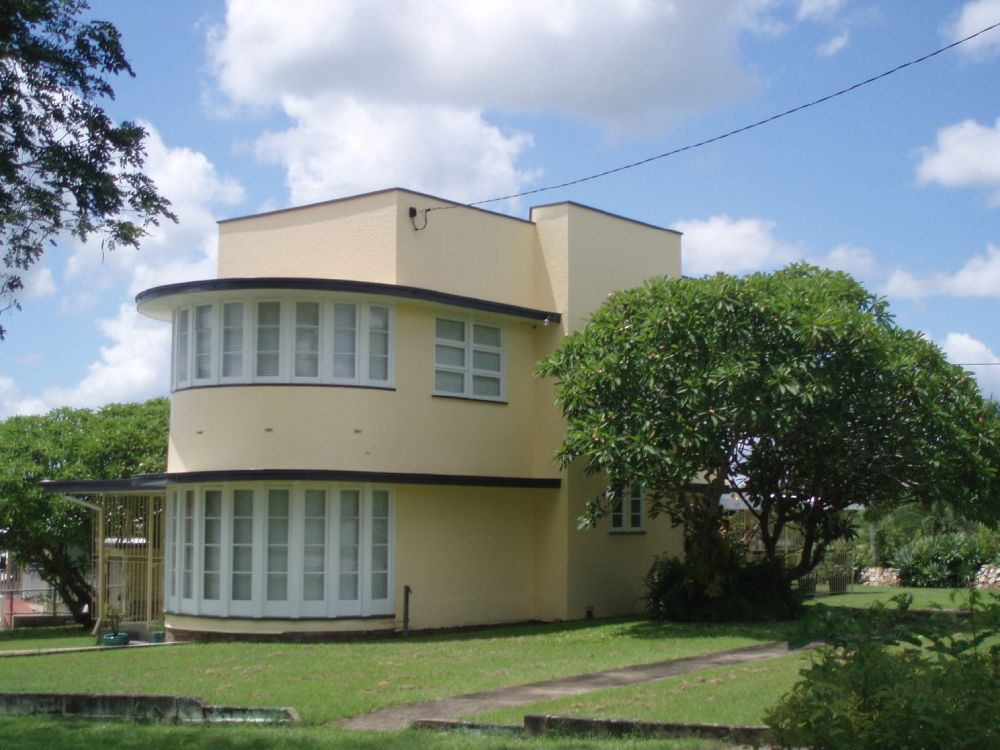
- Amla, 2009

- Location within Queensland Location within Australia
- 23.4°S 150.497°E
- Location: 49 Jessie Street, The Range, Rockhampton, Rockhampton Region, Queensland, Australia

History
- Design period: 1940s–1960s (post-World War II)
- Built: 1952

Site notes
- Architect: Arthur Edward Hegvold
- Architectural style: Functionalism

Queensland Heritage Register
- Official name: Amla
- Type: state heritage (landscape, built)
- Designated: 28 July 2000
- Reference no.: 601593
- Significant period: 1950s (fabric)
- Significant components: furniture/fittings, garden/grounds, residential accommodation – main house
- Builders: Robert Leonard Schofield

Amla is a heritage-listed detached house at 49 Jessie Street, The Range, Rockhampton, Rockhampton Region, Queensland, Australia. It was designed by Edward Arthur Hegvold and built in 1952 by Robert Leonard Schofield. It was added to the Queensland Heritage Register on 28 July 2000.

== History ==
Amla is a two-storeyed Functionalist style residence designed by Rockhampton architect E. A. Hegvold.

The land on which the house is situated was purchased in 1951 by Norman and Victoria Nell Ellemor. Norman Ellemor was the Rockhampton manager of Thos Brown, a firm of Queensland merchants. The house was built in 1952 with the builder being RL Schofield. By this time post war building restrictions had been eased in Rockhampton. In 1953 with the transfer of the Ellemor's to the south the house was purchased by the present owners as a city residence. The original address for the house was Brecknell Street and the block of land in the adjacent Jessie Street was added to the site in 1969.

Edward Arthur Hegvold was born in Rockhampton 1909. He commenced his architectural training in Rockhampton in 1924 as an articled pupil to Roy Chipps and continued in Chipps employ until 1935. During the depression Hegvold and Chipps started Art Adds, a business designing advertisements and labels, along with lantern slide advertisements for local cinemas. From 1935–38 Hegvold was employed as the manager of Tucker and Hall, Plasters and Tilers, Rockhampton. He opened his own architectural practice in 1938. In 1942 during World War II, he was employed as an architect at the US Army Base Section 3 Rockhampton. He worked in the Engineering section designing many new buildings including aircraft hangars, warehouses and refitting many existing buildings for use by the army. During this time Hegvold developed a keen interest in structural engineering an interest that he would later be exhibit in his private practice. For many years after the war, Hegvold would regularly correspond with the U.S. Engineers and would receive structural engineering textbooks. He reopened his practice after the War. From 1976–78 the firm became Hegvold Finlayson & Associates. The practice closed in 1980, but Hegvold came out of retirement in 1984 to design the new fire station and residence at Emu Park. Hegvold died in Rockhampton in 1991.

In the 1950s, 1960s and 1970s Hegvold was a leading architect in Rockhampton with a large practice that undertook civic, commercial and domestic work, not only in Rockhampton but throughout central Queensland. Buildings in Rockhampton include the Rockhampton Electricity Board, RACQ Building, Tobruk House, United Dominions House, YMCA/RCYA, World War 2 Memorial Pool and Riverside Caravan Park Amenities Block. In central Queensland he designed the North Gregory Hotel in Winton (with Engineer Jack Mulholland), Longreach Fire Station, Emerald Fire Station, Alpha Town Hall and Jericho Town Hall. Hegvold was a prominent citizen and a life member of many Rockhampton clubs including the RSL, Masonic Club, Bowls Club and Basketball Club. He did a great deal of honorary work for charities and the Rockhampton Basketball Stadium is named in his honour.

== Description ==
Amla is a two storey cubiform residence with a timber structure faced externally with textured cement render. It has a skillion roof concealed behind parapets and drained by large rain water heads. The exterior of the house is designed as a composition of horizontals and verticals. The main entrance and stairway is expressed as a projecting vertical wing, while the body of the building has windows with continuous hoods for sunshading, which form contrasting horizontal elements.

The architectural style is forthrightly Interwar Functionalist, even though the house was not built until after World War Two. Amla is a good example, of a residence in this idiom. It displays many of the characteristics typical of the Interwar Functionalist style. The house has plain surfaces and is an asymmetrical composition of simple horizontal and vertical elements. The predominant horizontality of the design is broken by a slightly projecting stair hall of vertical proportions in the external wall of which a pair of vertical windows glazed in green obscure glass, rise from the level of the lower internal stair landing. The parapets above the flat roof define the horizontal lines if the building, along with the continuous cantilevered sunscreen hoods at both levels, which wrap around the rounded corners.

The garden surrounding the house is pleasant and unassuming, in harmony with its neighbours.

Internally the planning of the house is compact. The scale is successful giving the interiors a quality of amplitude despite their tight planning. The functionalist character is continued inside with elements and detailing such as the open stairwell with solid balustrading and polished timber capping surmounted by decorative curved chrome plated railings.

== Heritage listing ==
Amla was listed on the Queensland Heritage Register on 28 July 2000 having satisfied the following criteria.

The place is important in demonstrating the evolution or pattern of Queensland's history.

Amla is part of the pattern of the post war development of Rockhampton.

The place demonstrates rare, uncommon or endangered aspects of Queensland's cultural heritage.

Amla is an example of a residence designed in the Interwar Functionalist style, a style comparatively rare in Rockhampton.

The place is important in demonstrating the principal characteristics of a particular class of cultural places.

Amla is a very good example of a residence designed in the Interwar Functionalist style, a style comparatively rare in Rockhampton. The building displays many of the characteristics of this style including its cubiform, parapeted asymmetrical shape with smooth rendered and painted exterior wall finish. The fenestration is a composition of vertical and horizontals with strip windows including vertical openings in a projecting stair hall as well as curvilinear ranges of window lights, and cantilevered hoods and strips with edges painted in a contrasting colour.

It is a good example of the work of the architect E. A. Hegvold who was instrumental in defining the post World War Two architectural character of Rockhampton and central Queensland.
