= Edward Arthur Hegvold =

Edward Arthur Hegvold (1909–1991) was an architect in Rockhampton, Queensland, Australia. A number of his works are now heritage-listed.

== Early life ==
Edward Arthur Hegvold was born in Rockhampton on 2 October 1909, the son of Norwegian immigrants Ingebrigt (Albert) Hegvold and Annie (née Larsen).

== Architectural career ==
Hegvold commenced his architectural training in Rockhampton in 1924 as an articled pupil to Roy Chipps and continued in the employ of Chipps until 1935. During the depression, Hegvold and Chipps started Art Ads, a business designing advertisements and labels, along with lantern slide advertisements for local cinemas. Hegvold registered with the Board of Architects (Queensland) on 13 July 1933. From 1935 to 1938 Hegvold was employed as the manager of Tucker and Hall, Plasters and Tilers, Rockhampton. He opened his own architectural practice in 1938. In 1942, he was employed as an architect at the US Army Base Section 3 Rockhampton. He worked in the Engineering section designing aircraft hangars, warehouses and refitting many existing buildings for use by the army. He reopened his practice after the War.

In 1947 Hegvold won a design competition for the Crown Hotel in Rockhampton. In the 1950s, 1960s and 1970s his architectural practice in Rockhampton undertook civic, commercial and domestic work throughout Central Queensland. Buildings in Rockhampton include the Rockhampton Electricity Board, RACQ Building, Tobruk House, United Dominions House, YMCA/RCYA, World War 2 Memorial Pool and Riverside Caravan Park Amenities Block. In Central Queensland he designed the North Gregory Hotel Winton (with Engineer Jack Mulholland), Longreach Fire Station, Emerald Fire Station, Alpha Town Hall and Jericho Town Hall. From 1976 to 78 the firm became Hegvold Finlayson & Associates. The practice closed in 1980, but Hegvold came out of retirement in 1984 to design the new fire station and residence at Emu Park.

== Civic contributions ==
Hegvold was a life member of many Rockhampton clubs including the RSL, Masonic Club, Bowls Club and Basketball Club. The North Rockhampton Bowls Club features the "Eddie Hegvold Bar" and the Hegvold Stadium used by Rockhampton Basketball Inc is named in his honour. He became president of Rockhampton Basketball in 1964, holding that office until 1969 when he stood down and became Patron of Rockhampton Basketball, a position he held until he died in 1991. He was responsible for planning, designing and organising to have the amenities at the Victoria Park basketball complex constructed. He also organised the Mayday Basketball Carnival in Rockhampton, building it up to become one of the most popular basketball carnivals in Queensland through the 1970s and 1980s.

== Later life ==
Hegvold died in Rockhampton on 2 May 1991.

== Significant works ==
- Amla (residence), Rockhampton
- Bell tower of St Paul's Cathedral, Rockhampton
