= Koongal, Queensland =

Koongal
- Suburb
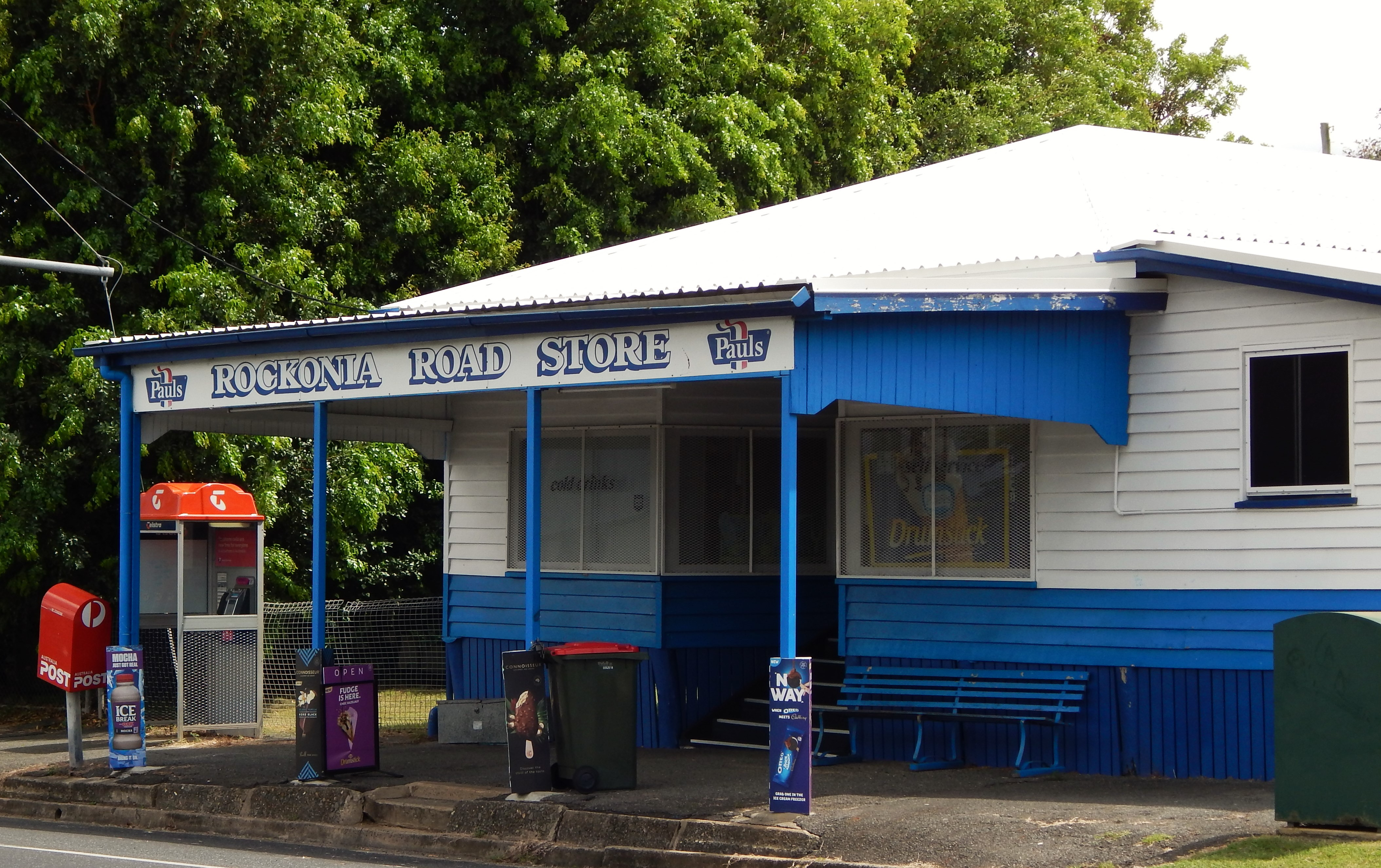
- Rockonia Road Store in Koongal, 2022

- Interactive map of Koongal
- Coordinates: 23.3694°S 150.5483°E
- Country: Australia
- State: Queensland
- LGA: Rockhampton Region
- Location: 5.0 km (3.1 mi) NE of Rockhampton CBD; 636 km (395 mi) NNW of Brisbane

Government
  - State electorates: Rockhampton; Keppel
  - Federal division: Capricornia

Area
  - Total: 4.4 km^{2} (1.7 sq mi)

Population
  - Total: 4,252 (2021 census)
  - Density: 966/km^{2} (2,503/sq mi)
- Time zone: UTC+10:00 (AEST)
- Postcode: 4701
Suburbs around Koongal
Frenchville	Frenchville	Frenchville
Berserker	Koongal	Lakes Creek
The Common	The Common	Port Curtis

Koongal is a suburb of Rockhampton in the Rockhampton Region, Queensland, Australia. In the 2021 census, Koongal had a population of 4,252 people.

== Geography ==
The suburb is located on a small section of the Fitzroy River. The Rockhampton–Emu Park Road runs through from south-west to south-east.

Koongal railway station is an abandoned railway station on the former North Rockahampton to Emu Park railway (23.3746°S 150.5529°E).

== History ==
In January 1901, Bishop Joseph Higgins opened and dedicated a new Catholic church in Koongal. It was known as St Nicholas Catholic Church. It was enlarged in 1920 and was demolished in 1958 to make way for a new church building.

On Sunday 17 May 1914, Bishop George Halford dedicated the Anglican Church of St John the Evangelist. The church was in Harbourne Street (approx 23.3742°S 150.5535°E) and operated until 1977.

St Maria Goretti Catholic Church opened in 1958 at 192 Thozet Road (corner Dunbar Street, 23.3640°S 150.5447°E). It closed on 19 February 2017.

Mount Archer State School opened on 25 January 1982.

In September 2000, Enid O'Toole Park was officially opened in Koongal, named in honour of a local Rockhampton woman who is credited with pioneering the roles of women in the banking sector as one of the first female bank managers in Queensland.

Koongal was one of the worst affected Rockhampton suburbs during the 2009 bushfires in the Mount Archer National Park in October 2009. A Koongal home in Poinciana Street was destroyed in the bushfire.

After an archaeological investigation, the graves of famous Australian botanist Anthelme Thozet, his son Auguste Thozet and his daughter-in-law Lucy Thozet were discovered in Koongal in 2010. They were located in Norris Park on what was Thozet's sprawling "Muellerville" 70-acre experimental garden.

In 2015, the Rockonia Road Store in Koongal sustained damage during Cyclone Marcia when its roof was torn off in the strong winds. The store was quickly repaired and promptly resumed trade.

== Demographics ==
In the 2011 census, Koongal had a population of 4,728 people.

At the 2016 census, Koongal had a population of 4.286 people.

In the 2021 census, Koongal had a population of 4,252 people.

== Heritage listings ==
Koongal has a number of heritage-listed sites, including:

- Lakes Creek Hotel, 431 Lakes Creek Road (23.3757°S 150.5578°E)

== Education ==
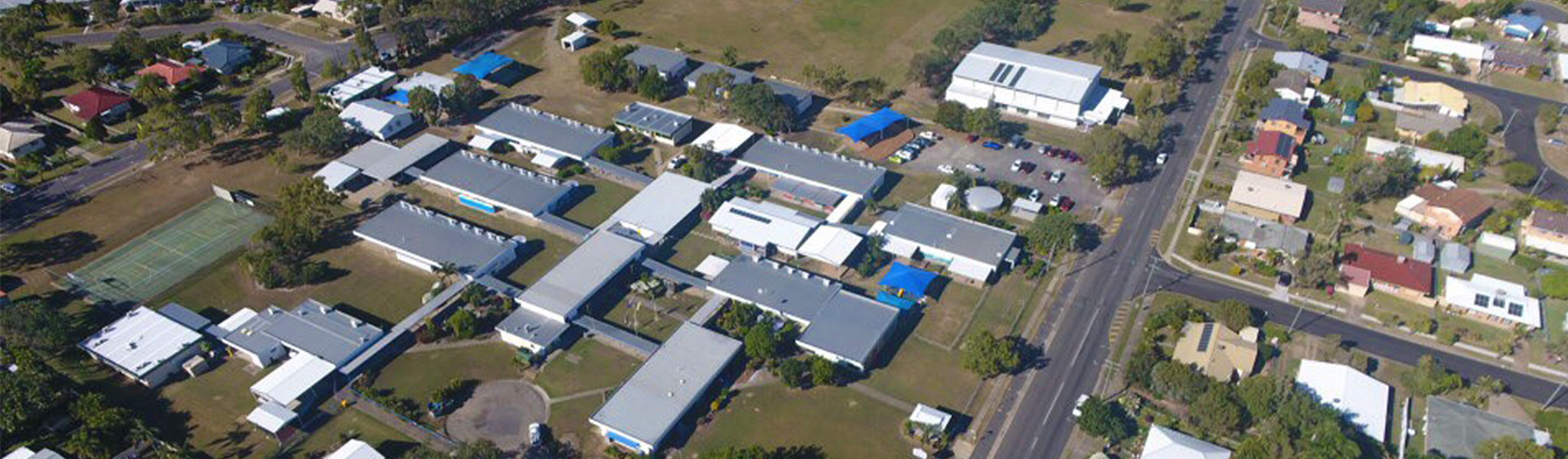
Aerial view of Mount Archer State School, 2022

Despite the name, Mount Archer State School is a government primary (Prep-6) school for boys and girls at 242 Thozet Road in Koongal (23.3581°S 150.5456°E). In 2018, the school had an enrolment of 650 students with 48 teachers (44 full-time equivalent) and 32 non-teaching staff (20 full-time equivalent). It includes a special education program.

There are no secondary schools in Koongal. The nearest government secondary school is North Rockhampton State High School in neighbouring Frenchville to the north-west.
