= Clancholla =

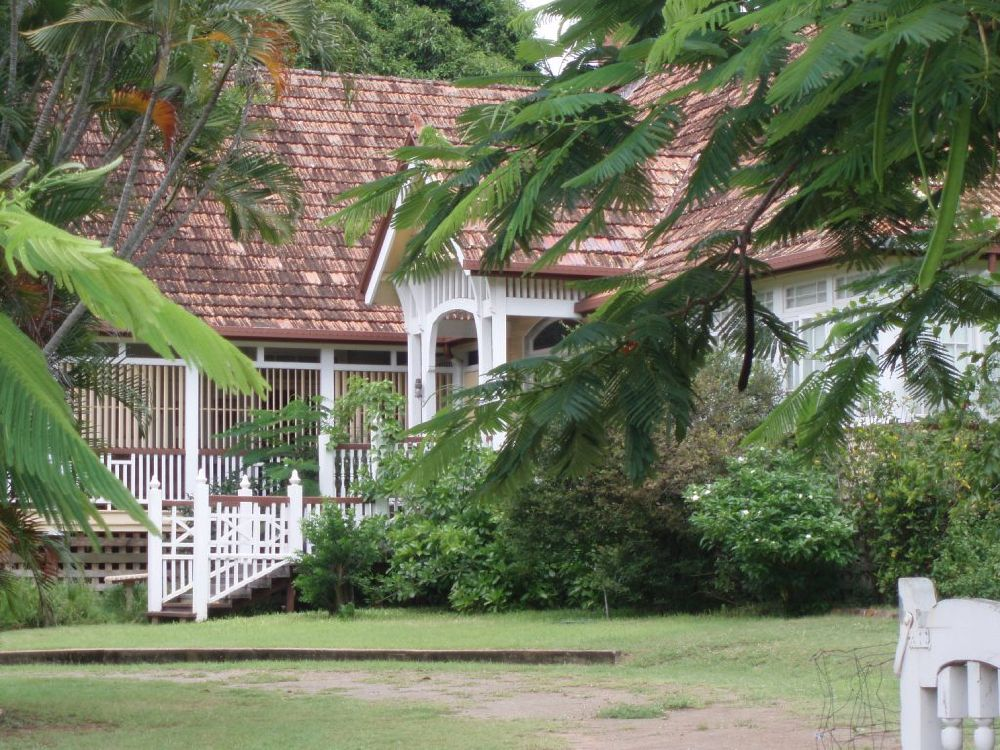
- Entrance to Clancholla, 2009

- Location within Queensland Location within Australia
- 23.3981°S 150.4991°E
- Location: 25 Ward Street, The Range, Rockhampton, Rockhampton Region, Queensland, Australia

History
- Design period: 1919–1930s (interwar period)
- Built: c. 1922

Queensland Heritage Register
- Official name: Clancholla
- Type: state heritage (landscape, built)
- Designated: 12 January 2003
- Reference no.: 601592
- Significant period: 1920s (fabric)
- Significant components: garden – bed/s, lawn/s, lead light/s, driveway, residential accommodation – main house, laundry – commercial, gate – entrance, trees/plantings, stained glass window/s, garden/grounds, tennis court, garage, kitchen/kitchen house

Clancholla is a heritage-listed villa at 25 Ward Street, The Range, Rockhampton, Rockhampton Region, Queensland, Australia. It was built c. 1922. It was added to the Queensland Heritage Register on 12 January 2003.

== History ==
Clancholla is a single storey, timber house constructed by 1922 in Ward Street, The Range, for Stuart MacDonald and family. The Athelstane Range area, overlooking Rockhampton, was much sought after by many of Rockhampton's affluent families as a location in which to construct their prominent residences.

Clancholla was owned by descendants of Peter Fitzallan MacDonald (1830–1919). MacDonald arrived in Rockhampton 1858 after being attracted by the Canoona gold rush. He found riches in pastoral land instead and established important social and economic connections in the surrounding districts. After his initial exploration and pastoral pioneering phase, MacDonald and his wife came to Yaamba in 1861, which became his headquarters and the family home on the Fitzroy River. MacDonald used pastoral exploration and speculation in runs to assist in financing his permanent stations, Fernlees at Springsure, and Columbra on the Mackenzie River. These two stations were to remain in the MacDonald family well into the 20th century. Like his father PF MacDonald, Stuart MacDonald was also a pastoralist, running "Highland Plains", at Capella.

By the 1890s the majority of Rockhampton's houses, from gentlemen's residences to the more humble workers cottages, were built of timber on high wooden stumps. This evolution in local housing to accommodate the region's tropical climatic conditions included verandahs as an integral part of all older Rockhampton houses. Many of these houses also had wooden lattice panels to filter the bright sunlight, as well as to ensure a degree of privacy.

From the 1890s to the time of World War II, most Rockhampton houses also possessed spacious living areas with dining and sitting rooms, separated by open archways that were often bordered with intricate fretwork designs produced by local skilled craftsmen. In this period very few houses built had open fireplaces and chimneys, although Clancholla exhibits a centrally placed chimney.

The construction of prominent residences, particularly in the Athelstane Range area, reflected the wealth and status of prominent pastoral families, reflected in the construction of prominent residences highlighting elevated social status and economic success. Prominent pastoral families often maintained a town residence, and this is the case with the MacDonald family. Many South Sea Islanders, predominantly from Joskeleigh (Sand Hills) worked for the MacDonald's as domestics, both in town and at "Highland Plains". South Sea Islanders, Doris Leo, Mabel Yow Yeh, Rose Warcon, Ruth Parter, Laurel Parter and Sibble Youse were all employed at some time from the 1940s. When the family came to Rockhampton to Clancholla, the South Sea Islander domestics were usually asked to return with them to town.

In 1906, Stuart MacDonald purchased Kenmore House, in Ward Street, following the death of its owner, John Ferguson. Built for Ferguson in c. 1894, Kenmore has been described as the grandest mansion ever to be built in Rockhampton. The MacDonald's owned Kenmore for some years but considered it to be too large for use as a private home and sold it in 1915 to the Sisters of Mercy. The Sisters of Mercy later established the Mater Misericordiae Hospital in the building.

The sale of Kenmore to the Sisters of Mercy comprised three and a half acres in which the residence stood, including the whole of the gardens and the tennis court. A lower paddock was retained by the MacDonald family on which Clancholla was constructed by c. 1922.

Integral to the significance of Clancholla is its remnant garden elements. Characteristic of the Queen Anne architectural style are picturesque gardens, reflecting the garden suburb concept. The garden at Clancholla was a significant aesthetic feature of the property.

A description of it was included in an article, 'Rockhampton's Attractive Gardens No.13', in the Evening News on 16 March 1939. In the article the MacDonald's garden was described as being "planted for permanency", with beds composed of trees, shrubs, and climbers, and perennial varieties of flowers including geraniums, gerberas, and salvias. The choice of vegetation was described as a wise one as the MacDonald's permanent home was at "Highland Plains" at Capella. The MacDonald's visited Rockhampton periodically and the garden was not always under their "immediate supervision".

The lay out of the garden was described as formal, with symmetrical round or square beds and broad drives between. Also described was the (still extant) centre piece of oval lawn directly opposite the front entrance, around which on one side swept a wide path back to the entrance gate, and on the other through an archway of Thomasi and Lateritia Bougainvilleas. Fruit trees at the rear of the grounds included mangoes, custard apples, and persimmons.

The MacDonald family sold Clancholla in December 2012.

== Description ==
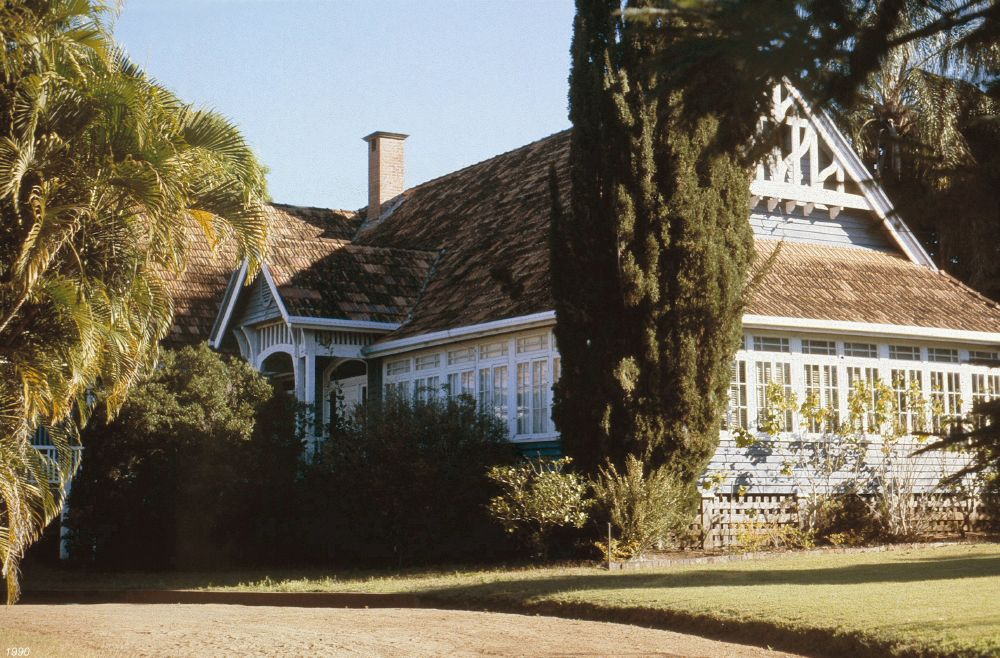
Clancholla, 1997

Clancholla is a single storey timber residence with a terracotta tiled roof, set on timber stumps surrounded by timber lattice work. Set amongst mature gardens, including pines, figs and jacarandas along the Ward Street side and to the rear of the house, with other plantings along western boundary, Clancholla addresses a circular driveway with large, centrally featured palms. The driveway sweeps around to the large timber garage at the rear of the property. Mature figs and mango trees are located at the rear of the property.

Clancholla is roughly L-shaped in plan with a projecting entrance porch perpendicular to the street and wide verandahs. The roof gables have decorative timber bargeboards and terracotta finial details.

A panelled, timber entrance door, with stained glass and leadlight fanlight and breezeway assembly, leads to the entrance foyer. The foyer opens to the large open living area. In this area the vertically joined timber walls are stained up to picture rail height and above this, the timber panelled ceiling is painted white. Windows, both casement and sash, with stained glass and leadlight details are located throughout the length of the space. An open, squared archway leads to the dining room. The archway comprises paired, timber columns with moulded capitals supporting a moulded architrave.

On the southern and eastern sides of the house, several paired timber doors with stained glass and leadlight details open to the verandah. On the southern side, the verandah is enclosed with timber framed casement windows, while the eastern side is enclosed with timber louvres. The sloping verandah ceiling is lined with horizontally joined timber.

Three rooms with timber panelled ceilings are located on the western side of the house. In each room, French doors open out to the verandah on both the southern and northern sides, which, like the eastern side, are enclosed with timber louvres, while the ceiling is lined with horizontally joined timber.

At the western end of the verandah, French doors open to a large bedroom with a timber framed bay window (casements). The room, similarly to the open living and dining room, has a timber panelled ceiling.

The kitchen, located in the north-eastern section of the house, has vertically joined timber walls with a horizontally joined timber ceiling. The kitchen opens to the open, north-eastern end of the verandah. The eastern end of this section of the verandah is enclosed, with remnant ripple iron lining the walls, to accommodate bathroom facilities.

A laundry, with extant copper enclosed in brick with a brick chimney, is located in the eastern side of the house.

A tennis court is located to the west of the house and a double timber garage with gabled roof is located in the south-west corner of the property.

== Heritage listing ==
Clancholla was listed on the Queensland Heritage Register on 12 January 2003 having satisfied the following criteria.

The place is important in demonstrating the evolution or pattern of Queensland's history.

The wealth and status of pastoral families was often highlighted in the construction of prominent residences in sought after areas in town, highlighting elevated social status and economic success.

The place is important in demonstrating the principal characteristics of a particular class of cultural places.

Clancholla is significant in demonstrating the principal characteristics of a class of place in its adaptation in the Queensland timber house. With its asymmetrical massing and ensemble of various roof shapes; Marseilles pattern terracotta roof tiles; prominent gable facing Ward Street; prominent timber gable screen and terracotta gable accessories and wide veranda with timber posts and brackets; as well as its remnant formal garden elements, including circular driveway with a formal garden arrangement, Clancholla is a fine example of a domestic building constructed with elements of the Queen Anne architectural style. In its extant form Clancholla exhibits a sophisticated refinement to Queensland's timber housing tradition and remains one of Rockhampton's distinctive homes.

Internally, Clancholla is highly intact with stained timber interiors with decorative mouldings; stained glass and leadlight windows and marble fireplace.

The place is important because of its aesthetic significance.

Clancholla is significant for its strong aesthetic characteristics, particularly for its contribution to the residential streetscape of the Athelstane Range, an area noted for its many prominent residences including Killin (later the Yungaba Migrant Hostel), Kenmore House (now the Mater Misericordiae Hospital, Killowen and the Rudd Residence.

The place has a special association with the life or work of a particular person, group or organisation of importance in Queensland's history.

Clancholla is significant for its association with the MacDonald family, a prominent Central Queensland pastoral family, descended from PF MacDonald who first arrived in the Rockhampton area in 1858. Clancholla is still in the ownership of the MacDonald family.
