= History of Rockhampton Base Hospital =

Rockhampton Hospital
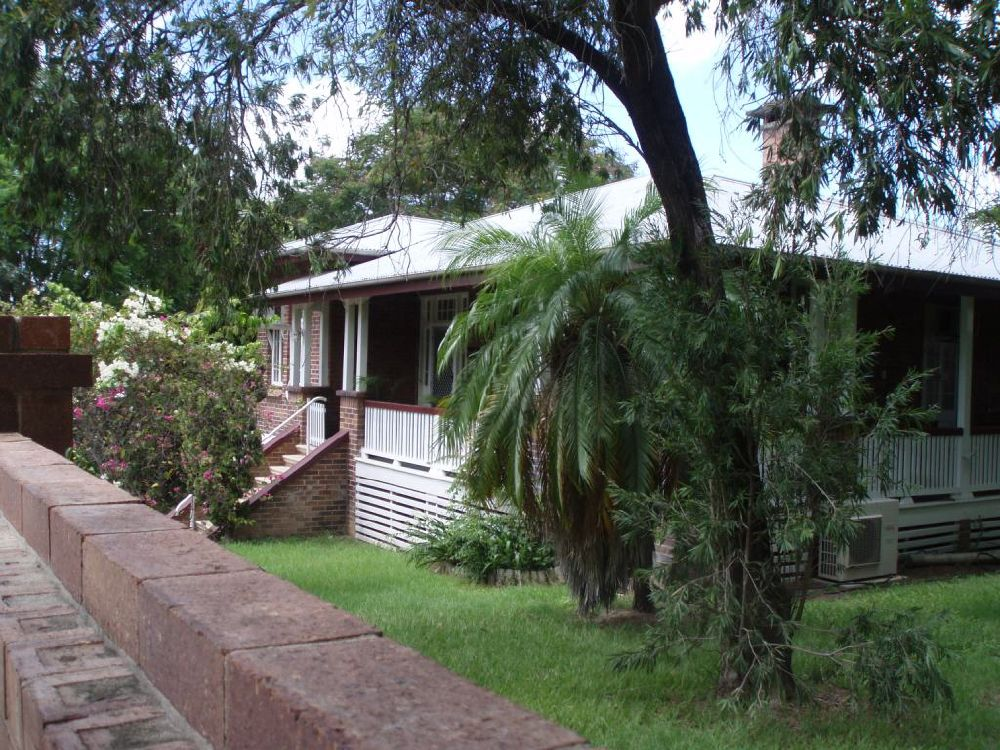
- Medical Superintendents Residence, 2009

- Location within Queensland Location within Australia
- 23.379°S 150.4952°E
- Location: Canning Street, The Range, Rockhampton, Rockhampton Region, Queensland, Australia

History
- Design period: 1919–1930s (interwar period)
- Built: 1936

Queensland Heritage Register
- Official name: Rockhampton Hospital – Therapies Block and Medical Superintendents Residence, Outpatients and Sister Kenny Clinic and Medical Superintendent's Residence
- Type: state heritage (built)
- Designated: 21 November 1997
- Reference no.: 601967
- Significant period: 1936 (fabric); 1930s (historical)
- Significant components: residential accommodation – superintendent's house/quarters, fence/wall – perimeter

Rockhampton Base Hospital is an historic hospital at Canning Street, The Range, Rockhampton, Rockhampton Region, Queensland, Australia. It was established in 1867. The hospital's medical superintendent's residence (built in 1936) and Therapies Block (also known as the Outpatients Clinic and Sister Kenny Clinic, built in 1938) were added to the Queensland Heritage Register on 21 November 1997.

== History ==
The Rockhampton Hospital site was established in 1867, and was the second site of a hospital in the city. The extant buildings on the site date from the twentieth century. The parts of the hospital which are considered to be of cultural heritage significance include a former Outpatients Department incorporating a purpose built Kenny Clinic dating from 1938; a former nurses' quarters dating from 1929 and a medical superintendent's residence constructed in 1936, along with a substantial brick fence on the Canning Street boundary of the hospital.

A hospital, named the Port Curtis and Leichhardt District Hospital, was established in Rockhampton in 1858, and in 1867 a decision was made to relocate the hospital to a more elevated site on the Athelstane Range to the south of the town centre. A large two storeyed brick building was constructed on the new site to the design of local architect, John Thomas Thorne. This was extended on the late 1870s and additional buildings were constructed on the site in the 1880s all to the design of another Rockhampton architect, John William Wilson.

The Rockhampton Hospital, as it was now named, grew slowly until the introduction of the Hospitals Act (1923) generated a large number of building works on site. The Act brought about many changes to the practice of health care provision in Queensland, resulting in the state government providing more funding to hospitals, bringing about the current system of health care as a responsibility of the state. The Act allowed for the creation of districts, each with a hospital board responsible for fundraising and management issues. Shortfalls in funding were met by state and local governments. The Hospital Board created to oversee the Rockhampton Hospital as a result of the Act, reviewed the entire site, at the time they were appointed. One of the first initiatives of the newly created board and as a result of the Maternity Act (1922) a maternity ward was constructed on the Rockhampton Hospital site in 1928. The Rockhampton maternity ward, which is now demolished, was of a standard plan and form. The next major building work, which was designed by local architects, Hockings and Palmer in 1926, was a nurses' quarters constructed in 1929.

=== Medical Superintendent's Residence ===
Hockings and Palmer, the architects of the first nurses' quarters were again employed on the next building project; the construction of a medical superintendents residence on Canning Street. Many medical residences were constructed on Hospital sites during the 1930s when formal schemes were introduced to house medical staff on site. To complement this building, and foreshadowing the design of the Outpatients Department of 1939, a brick fence was constructed along the Canning Street perimeter of the Hospital site. This was considered an integrating element and was dedicated to the memory of George Henry Sandrock, an early hospital benefactor. The elaborate geometrically designed gates have been removed but are stored on site.

=== Outpatients Department and Sister Kenny Clinic (now Therapies Block) ===
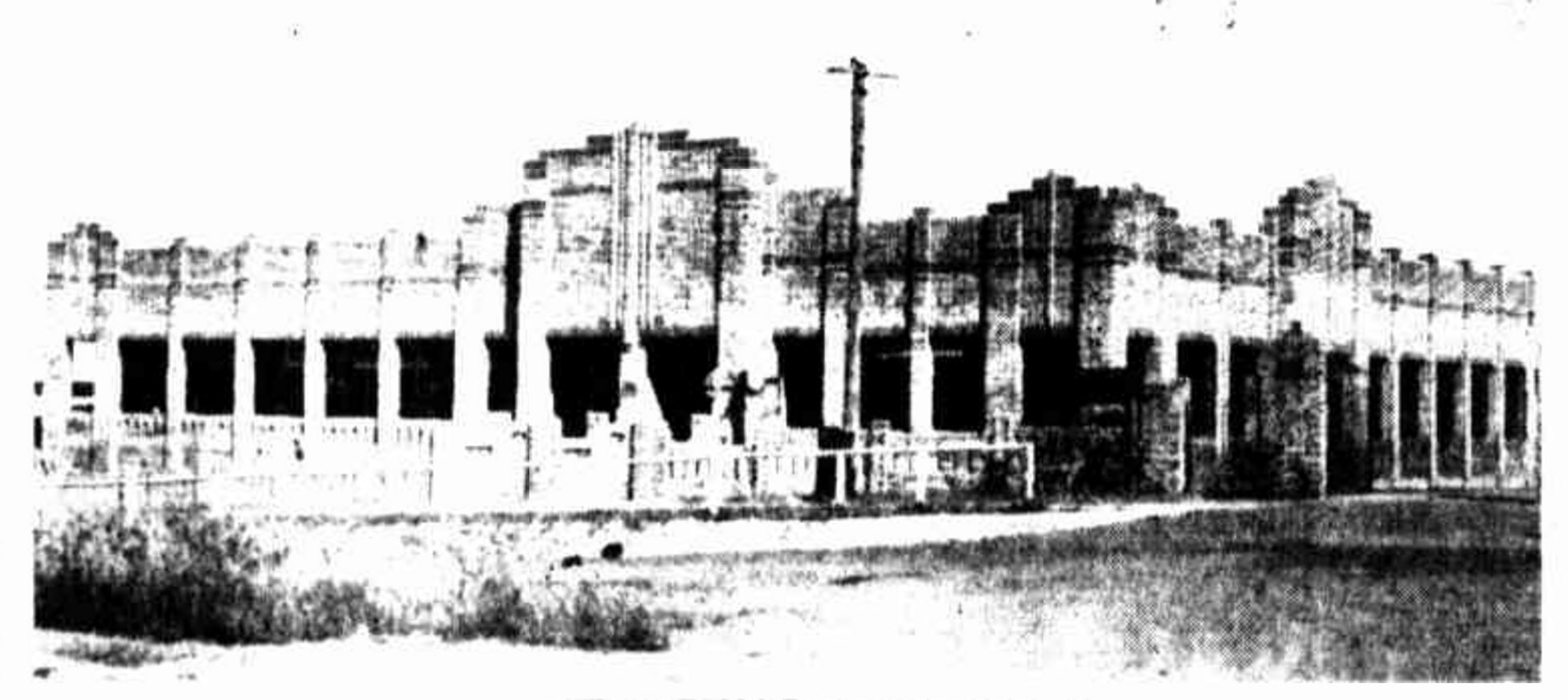
Sister Kenny clinic, 1939

The next major building constructed at the Rockhampton Hospital was a brick Outpatients' Department and Sister Kenny Clinic, also designed by Hockings and Palmer. The building was officially opened by the Minister for Health and Home Affairs, Mr Ned Hanlon on 25 June 1939.

At the opening discussion of the rapid and dramatic increase in the number of outpatients in the five years prior to the construction of the building was given as the reason for it. The Hospital Board had decided that the building would also house a Sister Kenny Clinic for the treatment of poliomyelitis. Two nurses trained in the Kenny method of treatment, came from Brisbane to Rockhampton to provide treatments at the clinic. The cost of the building was estimated at £13,500 of which the government had made a subsidy of £3100 and the balance had been finance by a debenture loan from the State Government Insurance Office.

Sister Elizabeth Kenny became a renowned medical figure for her treatment of people with poliomyelitis, an infectious disease causing motor paralysis and permanent deformities. Following an outbreak of the disease in 1931–32, Kenny's unorthodox methods of treating poliomyelitis were more seriously considered by the medical establishment resulting in the establishment of several clinics throughout Queensland, Australia and internationally. Although the benefits of her methods were never fully endorsed in Australia, the popularity of Sister Kenny and of her treatment was prolific. Previously poliomyelitis was treated with immobilisation, but Sister Kenny advocated mobility in the form of massage, warm baths and constant nursing supervision. Despite controversy surrounding Kenny, her methods were an interesting and controversial development in the treatment of poliomyelitis, spastic paralysis and other long term physical disabilities which were unavailable elsewhere.

Kenny opened a private clinic in Townsville in 1932 and soon attracted the attention of the government to her endeavours. The Home Secretary, Ned Hanlon, supported her methods and, through the Queensland Government, financed the establishment of Kenny Clinics at Townsville, Rockhampton, Cairns and Brisbane. The popularity of her work expanded and in 1938 the wing of the new outpatients block at the Rockhampton Hospital became the only purpose built Kenny Clinic in Queensland. At the opening Ned Hanlon, defended the government's financial backing of the Kenny method by saying:

"the methods were now in operation not only in Queensland, but in Tasmania, New South Wales and in London. In all those centres a great number of cases had been successfully dealt with and ... the clinic ... would prove a wonderful service to the people of Rockhampton."

The Outpatients' Department and Sister Kenny Clinic have been converted for use as a therapies block. The building is an important example of the work of architects, Hockings and Palmer and similar to their design for the Rockhampton Town Hall. It was designed, like the nearby residence and fence, from polychrome brick with Art Deco inspired detailing.

In the years following the construction of the Outpatients' Department, the idea of a "modern hospital" emerged as a departure from the nineteenth century pavilion planned hospital which endured into the twentieth century. The modern hospital was focussed on cleanliness and efficiency influenced by the new germ theory of disease. These values were achieved within the framework provided by a new, modern architecture and characterised by multi-levelled high rise structures incorporating new building and health technology.

As a result of these ideas governing hospital design many new buildings were constructed on the Hospital site. A five storeyed nurses quarters' was built from 1950, designed by Brisbane architects, Conrad and Gargett. In 1952 the same firm designed a single storeyed isolation ward and in 1958 they designed a two storeyed animal house. The next major building was constructed in 1959 when Conrad and Gargett designed a four storeyed chest clinic funded by the Australian Government as part of plan to eradicate tuberculosis and other chest related diseases. In 1970 construction of a new multi storeyed surgical block was commenced. In 1986 the remaining nineteenth century buildings and the 1930 Roy Chipps designed nurses' quarters were demolished.

In about 1997, the therapies block was demolished despite its heritage listing.

== Description ==
The Rockhampton Hospital is on a large site elevated on the Athelstane Range, to the south of the Rockhampton town centre. The site is bordered by Canning, North, Cambridge and Quarry Streets. The buildings on which this report focuses are the therapies block and medical superintendent's residence both on Canning Street, a fence along the Canning Street boundary of the property and a former nurses' quarters, near the Canning Street entrance of the hospital.

=== Former Outpatients' Department and Sister Kenny Clinic ===
This is a substantial one storeyed face brick and concrete building situated close to the northern corner of the site and addressing Canning Street. The building has an L-shaped plan and a shallow pitched roof comprises two hipped sections all concealed by a parapet. Forming the northern, Canning Street elevation and the western elevation fronting the entrance drive, is an open brick framed loggia. The loggia comprises a number of square headed openings separated by substantial brick pillars which extend upward and project from the face of the parapet above the loggia. The openings are balustraded with brick panels with rectangular cutouts. The parapet steps up, to form symmetrical Art Deco projections over the principal entrances on the two principal facades and at the corners of the building. These projections feature clustered vertical bands of shaped brickwork. The facades of the building are lined with variously coloured brick bands and detailing surrounding windows and on the parapet projections.

=== 1936 Medical Superintendent's Residence ===
This building was designed by the architects of the former Outpatients Department and Sister Kenny's Clinic and is similar in material and detail. It is a one storeyed dark cavity brick and concrete building with a multi-hipped roof clad with corrugated iron. The house is sited facing Canning Street and this elevation of the building is dominated by a large, hipped roof porch, supported on brick piers surmounted by double timber columns. The porch is balustraded with vertical timber battening at the height of the brick piers. The interior contains three bedrooms, a bathroom, a lounge, kitchen and dining room. Accommodation for a laundry is under the house. The building is very intact, although the kitchen and bathroom have been refurbished. Two conifers are on either side of the Canning Street entrance.

=== Fence along Canning Street ===
Along the Canning Street boundary of the site is a substantial brick fence, which visually integrates the brick buildings along this side of the hospital. The fence steps down the length of the boundary and at each break features brick piers decorated with strapwork caps. Along the top of the fence is a line of rectangular cutouts, similar to those on the balustrades of the former Outpatients Department and Sister Kenny Clinic.

== Heritage listing ==
The Therapies Block and Medical Superintendents Residence of the Rockhampton Hospital were listed on the Queensland Heritage Register on 21 November 1997 having satisfied the following criteria.

The place is important in demonstrating the evolution or pattern of Queensland's history.

The Rockhampton Hospital demonstrates the growth of Rockhampton and its prominence as a large regional centre. The former Sister Kenny Clinic is important for its demonstration of the development of medical history, particularly concerning the treatment of poliomyelitis.

The place demonstrates rare, uncommon or endangered aspects of Queensland's cultural heritage.

The building is rare as the only purpose built Kenny Clinic constructed in Queensland, although many others opened in converted buildings.

The place has potential to yield information that will contribute to an understanding of Queensland's history.

This building, which is substantially intact, has the potential to yield further information about Kenny's methods of treatment.

The place is important in demonstrating the principal characteristics of a particular class of cultural places.

The former Sister Kenny Clinic, medical residence of 1936 and fence along Canning Street are good and characteristic examples of the work of Rockhampton architects, Hockings and Palmer and designed in a manner similar to their most prominent Rockhampton building, the Town Hall. In particular the former Outpatients' Department and Sister Kenny Clinic is particularly prominent as a well designed corner building.

The place is important because of its aesthetic significance.

The buildings at the hospital have considerable architectural merit, as well composed and complementary structures with significant landmark qualities and are important elements of this streetscape. The former nurses' quarters, also designed by Hockings and Palmer, is a well designed functional building adapted to the tropical climate of Rockhampton with much attention paid to ventilation.

The place has a strong or special association with a particular community or cultural group for social, cultural or spiritual reasons.

The hospital site has importance for its associations with Sister Kenny and as the principal place of public health care in Rockhampton for about 130 years.

The place has a special association with the life or work of a particular person, group or organisation of importance in Queensland's history.

The site is important for its associations with local architects, Hockings and Palmer.
