= Wiseman's Cottage =

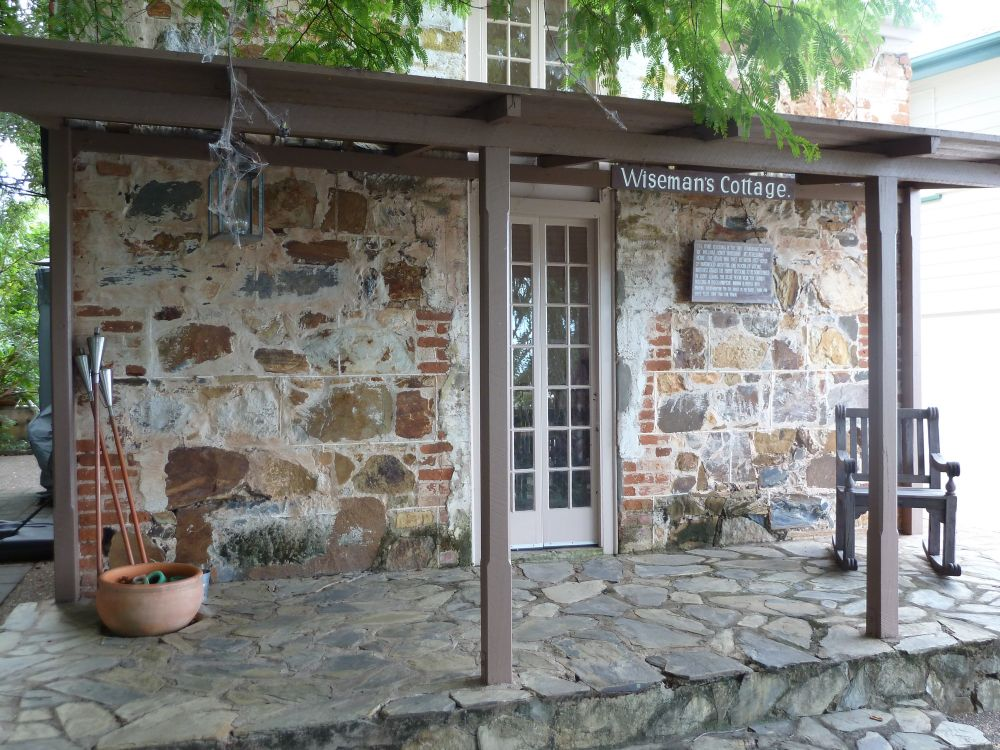
- Wiseman's Cottage, 2012

- Location within Queensland Location within Australia
- 23.4057°S 150.498°E
- Location: 30 Nathan Street, The Range, Rockhampton, Rockhampton Region, Queensland, Australia

History
- Design period: 1840s–1860s (mid-19th century)
- Built: c. 1857–c. 1859

Queensland Heritage Register
- Official name: Wiseman's Cottage, Mount Athelstane
- Type: state heritage (landscape, built)
- Designated: 21 October 1992
- Reference no.: 600798
- Significant period: 1850s (fabric, historical)
- Significant components: tank – water (underground), chimney/chimney stack, store/s / storeroom / storehouse, fence/wall – perimeter, garden/grounds

Wiseman's Cottage is a heritage-listed storehouse at 30 Nathan Street, The Range, Rockhampton, Rockhampton Region, Queensland, Australia. It was built from c. 1857 to c. 1859. It is also known as Mount Athelstane. It was added to the Queensland Heritage Register on 21 October 1992.

== History ==
Wiseman's Cottage was constructed in 1859 as part of Henry Wiseman's residence which overlooked the Yeppen Yeppen Lagoon on the outskirts of Rockhampton. The stone structure was built as a storage section for the timber home of 16 rooms and is the only remaining part of the original residence. Credited as the oldest surviving structure in Rockhampton the cottage is significant for its association with Henry Wiseman, the Land Commissioner who was responsible for officially siting and naming the township of Rockhampton.

Rockhampton was proclaimed a township and port of entry in October 1858 after Henry Wiseman the Land Commissioner for the Leichhardt District was requested to find a suitable site on the Fitzroy River for a township. Wiseman agreed with Charles Archer (the original settler of Rockhampton who established a property at Gracemere Homestead in 1855) that as the bar of rocks across the river had already fixed the head of navigation on the Fitzroy, this was the natural site for a township. After suggesting the names of Charleston and Palmerston for the new town in honour of two early settlers who declined the offer of the namesake, Wiseman named the town after the principal characteristic of the locality, the rocks in the river. Wiseman first referred to the name of "Rockhampton" in 1856.

In 1857 Wiseman decided to establish his own property in Rockhampton on a site at the southern end of the range overlooking the river flats in one direction and in the other, Yeppen Yeppen Lagoon. The erection of a basic structure consisting of several rooms was most likely completed by the end of 1857. The large 16-room slab house containing the stone "cottage" was not erected until 1859. In February 1859 Colin Archer noted in his journal that Wiseman was completing and furnishing his house "in capital style, but will find the expense very considerable ... It is a nice situation and could be made a first rate residence if £5,000 were expended on it".

The main house was built of slabs cut from the surrounding bush and had a shingled roof. Wiseman named the house Mount Athelstane which gave its name to the Athelstane Range, where the house was situated. The "Range", as it is referred to, became an area of affluent settlement in the following decades, for which Mount Athelstane set a precedent.

The stone room was constructed as a storage room from stone gathered on the property. The stone is supposed to have a faint date, 1859, scratched into the surface. A large underground tank also of stone provided the water supply.

The property was transferred to John McFarlane in 1874 and then to the Royal Bank of Queensland in 1889 who subdivided and sold off the original acreage. In February 1902 the property was transferred to Dorinda Curtis wife of George Silas Curtis MLA, one of the leading advocates for the separation of Central Queensland in Rockhampton.

The timber house was demolished in the 1950s during the ownership of Henry Phillips, after which the present residence was built. However, the stone "cottage" was retained and later used as a gift shop by the Parks who purchased the property in 1973. The Parks were the founding members of the National Trust in Rockhampton. It was during this time that two doors were cut into the structure. The property was bought by the present owners in 1983.

== Description ==
Wiseman's Cottage is a single-storeyed stone structure with a hipped corrugated iron roof located fronting Lavarack Street to the west. The building is located at the rear of a high-set timber residence which overlooks Yeppen Yeppen Lagoon to the distant Mount Morgan Range to the south.

The building consists of a single room, with a masonry chimney stack at the northern end and a verandah on the western side. The building has masonry quoining with random rubble stone infill over which narrow ridges of lime mortar have been applied to give the appearance of pointing to coursed ashlar. The southern wall is cement rendered, and patches of render have been applied to various parts of the structure. The northern end has a masonry infill section, possibly in place of an original fireplace.

The western verandah has a stone paved floor, with timber posts supporting a skillion awning. A centrally positioned multi-paned French door with battered reveals and external timber shutters opens onto the verandah. A multi-paned casement window with external timber shutters is positioned above the French door and opens above the awning level. A plaque commemorating the construction of the building is hung on the southern end of the western wall, and the name 'Wiseman's Cottage' is located centrally hung from the verandah top- plate.

The eastern elevation has a similar French door and casement window arrangement, with a covered walkway connecting the building to the adjacent residence.

Internally, the building has a raked ceiling lined with compressed sheeting, and rendered walls with the northern internal gable being unrendered stone.

An underground water tank is located to the northeast of the building. Established gardens surround the building, and a number of mature trees are located at the northern end of the site. A low rubble stone wall forms a base for the perimeter timber fence to the property.

== Heritage listing ==
Wiseman's Cottage was listed on the Queensland Heritage Register on 21 October 1992 having satisfied the following criteria.

The place is important in demonstrating the evolution or pattern of Queensland's history.

Wiseman's Cottage, a remnant of Henry Wiseman's Mount Athelstane, is one of the oldest surviving structures within the boundaries of Rockhampton and as such demonstrates the beginning of residential development in the city.

The place demonstrates rare, uncommon or endangered aspects of Queensland's cultural heritage.

Constructed in 1859, Wiseman's Cottage is a rare structure in Rockhampton, providing evidence of the original settlement in the area.

The place is important because of its aesthetic significance.

The structure is aesthetically important due to its scale, form, and construction of rough-cut stone, and together with the surrounding plantings the building makes a subtle contribution to the local streetscape. The colour and texture of its walls reveal the character of the local stone used in its construction.

The place has a special association with the life or work of a particular person, group or organisation of importance in Queensland's history.

Wiseman's Cottage has special association with Henry Wiseman, Land Commissioner of the Leichardt District who was responsible for officially naming and siting the township of Rockhampton in 1858 and precipitating a pattern of affluent settlement in the "Range" area.
