= Lakes Creek Hotel =

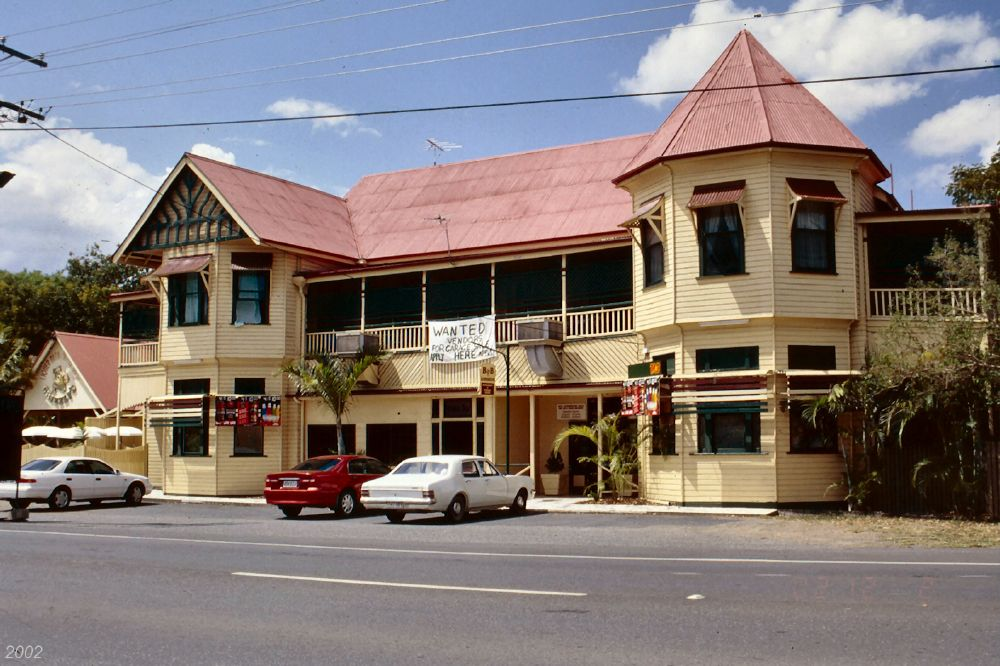
- Lakes Creek Hotel, 2002

- Location within Queensland Location within Australia
- 23.3757°S 150.5578°E
- Location: 431 Lakes Creek Road, Koongal, Rockhampton Region, Queensland, Australia

History
- Design period: 1870s - 1890s (late 19th century)
- Built: 1895

Site notes
- Architect: Eaton & Bates
- Architectural style: Gothic

Queensland Heritage Register
- Official name: Lakes Creek Hotel
- Type: state heritage (built)
- Designated: 21 October 1992
- Reference no.: 600796
- Significant period: 1890s (fabric); 1895-ongoing (historical use)
- Builders: T Moir

Lakes Creek Hotel is a heritage-listed hotel at 431 Lakes Creek Road, Koongal, Rockhampton Region, Queensland, Australia. It was designed by Eaton & Bates and built in 1895 by T Moir. It was added to the Queensland Heritage Register on 21 October 1992.

== History ==
The third hotel on the site, Lake's Creek Hotel was constructed in 1895 by builder T Moir, to a design by prominent Rockhampton architectural firm Eaton and Bates.

Lake's Creek was given its name after Captain Lake, who would run his ship into the creek to take on fresh water during the earliest days of Rockhampton's shipping industry during the 1850s. With the township of Rockhampton surveyed and established in 1859, outlying districts on both sides of the river were included and settled with increasing rapidity during the 1860s, including the district of Lake's Creek. The development of Lake's Creek as a village in its own right began in earnest in 1871 with the establishment of industry, educational, secular and social buildings in the form of construction of the Central Queensland Meat Preserving Company, school, church and public house.

With Cawarral Road (now Emu Park Road) commencing at Lake's Creek, at the site of the hotel, the establishment of a community there was important to the early development of the nearby settlements of Cawarral, Coorooman Creek and Emu Park. Lake's Creek Hotel became a "jumping off" point for the horse-drawn coach service to Emu Park, which was a four-hour journey one-way from Rockhampton.

While the business generated from the neighbouring meatworks would have been an influencing factor in choosing the site of a public house, it would not necessarily have precluded the decision to construct a hotel due to the rapid expansion of settlements, industry, agriculture and pastoralism between the Lake's Creek and Emu Park.

The first public house to be constructed opposite the new meatworks establishment in 1871 was considered by The Morning Bulletin as an unusually large and commodius hotel. While no plan or sketch of the Star Hotel could be found, its description is given as sixty feet by forty, containing seven or eight rooms, and fairly furnished.

Under the direction of James Cadden, the first licensee, the Star Hotel hosted social events that drew patrons from Rockhampton, including celebrations for the 1872 New Years Day Picnic. Travel to and from Lake's Creek for the southern settlers was by punt, the standard form of transport in the years prior to the construction of the first bridge across the Fitzroy River. Northern settlers were able to make their way to the hotel by way of a bush track that would eventually become Lakes Creek Road by means of foot, horse or buggy.

In 1877, the Star Hotel was renamed the Quarry's Arms Hotel. By 1879 the Quarry's Arms was under ownership of James Fenzi, with Martin Zimmerman holding the barman's licence. At three o'clock in the morning of January 6, 1880, the Quarry's Arms burnt to the ground. Reports at the time suggested that the fire was started by rats gnawing through shelving in the bar, causing bottles of liquor to fall and somehow ignite. The single story timber building was consumed within ten minutes of the start of the blaze. It appears probable that Martin Zimmerman purchased the site from James Fenzi and constructed a new hotel, presumably another single story house built also of timber, and named it the Lake's Creek Hotel.

This second structure continued to serve local patrons and travellers along the Cawarral Road and was purchased in 1890 by Thomas McLaughlin (Senior), the founder of Rockhampton's famous "Mac Beer" and owner of the Fitzroy Brewery in Quay Street during the 1880s and early 1890s, until his death at sea in 1892 whilst travelling to New Zealand. His company, Thomas McLaughlin & Co., was managed by his sons Joseph and Daniel who continued to run the Lake's Creek Hotel. Ownership of the hotel stayed in the family until its sale in 1971 to the Victorian company, Carlton United Brewery. During the 1980s, the hotel once more passed into local ownership, being purchased first by the McClymont family, then to Leigh Wanless, before being sold to the current owners in 1994.

It was not long before the demands of the growing village of Lake's Creek, local settlers and travellers to the communities along the Cawarral Road and the township of Emu Park, caused the owners of the hotel to consider expanding their establishment to supply the needs of an increasing patronage. On April 2, 1895, The Morning Bulletin advertised for tenders for the erection and completion of extensive hotel premises, Lakes Creek, for D. McLaughlin, Esq., under the direction of Messrs. Eaton and Bates, newly established architects for Rockhampton and surrounding districts who offered to provide designs with all the latest improvements.

Messrs GT Eaton and AE Bates formed a partnership after working for John Kirkpatrick in Sydney, where they practiced for a short time before heading North to Rockhampton where their services would be found to be very much in demand by the prosperous and growing township and surrounding areas. Eaton and Bates were the architects of a number of Central Queensland buildings including the offices of the Central Queensland Meat Export Co., commercial buildings; town residences and villas, and hotels throughout Mount Morgan, Rockhampton, Gladstone and Longreach.

On April 18, 1895, The Morning Bulletin published an editorial of a successful tender by Mr. T. Moir for the construction of the new Lake's Creek Hotel for the sum of £1773. The article provides details of the floor plan of the new hotel, including descriptions of rooms, hallways, amenities, servant's facilities, stables and a brick cellar built under the bar.

The Bulletin described how, originally the hotel was raised on stumps to three feet (approx. one metre), with the first floor plan containing the bar within the bay windows, the easternmost bay bearing a doorway for direct access to the main bar. The bar area itself was divided into two areas, a smaller section that housed a store room, and later a cold room, and was accessed from the main verandah or internally via the passages. The larger, main bar area serviced the eastern verandah and street entrance. Access to the cellar was likely obtained behind the servery area of the bar itself. The proprietor's quarters were located across from the bar, comprising a sitting room and bedroom which opened onto the surrounding verandah.

The Bulletin further described that located in the western bay windows of the hotel was a large public lounge. A large store room was adjacent to the lounge, which formed one side of the main entrance hall, and had both internal and external access. To the rear of the lounge was the dining room that had public access by either the lounge or rear verandah. Between this room and the central stairwell was originally a narrow store room that had one access from under the stairs. Adjacent to the dining room and running along the western side of the hotel was the pantry and kitchen with a large brick fireplace, the chimney of which extends through the above bedroom. Behind the kitchen a smaller stairwell opened onto the verandah and behind all a scullery, a wash house of similar size and a mans room. To the rear of the hotel was situated a stable, lavatories for men and ladies, and presumably storage areas for saddlery and buggy's. The main stairway leading from the ground to first floor is made of red cedar and embellished with decorative carvings on the barge boards, turned balusters and large, turned newel posts.

The first floor housed the sleeping quarters. Opening onto the front balcony was a guest's lounge. In all, twelve bedrooms were made available to guests on this floor, with a bathroom and linen room provided at each end of the building. A separate bathroom was to be provided at the rear for servants.

Significant changes have been made to the hotel since its construction, starting from the mid-1960s and continuing with the advent of new technology. Outbuildings, namely stables, garage and toilet facilities, extant on plans dating from 1965, have since been removed. A garden lounge was added to the rear of the hotel c. 1985, with an application to extend the lounge area and enclose it within a security fence in that year. A drive through bottle shop was added to the western side of the hotel in 1989.

Current owners as of 2025 are David Bond & Lily Bond.

== Description ==
The Lakes Creek Hotel, incorporating elements of the Victoria Free Gothic style of architecture, is a two-storey timber building, clad predominantly with weatherboards. The building is generally L-shaped in plan, with twin faceted bays forming a symmetrical frontage with an asymmetric roof. The western bay has a gable with a decorative bargeboard featuring foil tracery. The eastern bay has a conical roof, with iron capping.

Externally, the principle, or southern elevation along Lakes Creek Road, has an enclosed frontage with a small portico front entrance framed by external exposed studs. Raised ground surface adjacent to entrance is bitumened, with cemented pathway with paving stones, leading to front entrance. External studs have some weathering near ground level. Original French doors are located in the front entry through the entrance portico. Providing access to the public area from the street are original French doors, which have been salvaged and used from internal renovations. Bay windows are located within original timber frames. Windows within the extension of the public bar (incorporating verandah space) on the western side are aluminium framed.

The first floor balcony, along the southern elevation, has been divided by both timber and plywood partitioning. Weathering has occurred to some balustrades and floor boards on the verandah. Two air-conditioning motors have been installed below the balcony to service ground floor areas. Some damage, including missing balusters, has occurred at the eastern end of the balcony.

Along the eastern elevation, of the ground floor verandah, is located sections of the original timber valance. Timber balustrading and valance continues northerly along the verandah to the garden lounge enclosure. Access to the hotel along the eastern elevation is through original timber French doors.

On the first floor balcony along the eastern elevation, new timber lattice board has been erected above the railing for added privacy for the private quarters. Another two timber partitions are located along the eastern elevation balcony to provide privacy between rooms. The verandah on eastern side has considerable damage, including missing balusters and water damage. Access to rooms is by original timber French doors.

On the ground floor of the northern elevation is located the garden lounge. The northern section, where the L-shape forms, is of single skin exposed stud weatherboard construction. At the western end of the northern elevation, where the building extends to form the L-shape, there is substantial movement of the verandah post as well as timber rot to the verandah boards and balusters. Timber valance and balusters remain substantially intact in this area. Three original timber French doors are located at the eastern side of the building. Two sliding glass doors also provide access along the northern elevation. One door provides access to the stairwell, the other to the dining room. The roof of the Garden lounge extension adjacent to verandah, has been adjoined to the original building. Air conditioning systems are located on the garden lounge roof with vents into the first floor of the hotel.

The drive through bottle shop is located along the western elevation. The ground floor section is single skin timber, whilst the first floor level is clad with weatherboards. Timber framed sash windows, with hoods with timber brackets, are located along the elevation. The chimney is cement rendered. The western verandah has been reduced to a small entry patio to make room for a new men's toilets and to allow a larger storage area/cold room facilities in the position of the original pantry.

Internally, through the main entrance, the public bar is located on the western side of the building. The bar has a flagstone floor, timber bar with modern chrome and glass fixtures and fittings. The front verandah has been reduced to one-third its original size, with entry now through the old bar entrance. A partition has been built to close off the adjoining entrance from the verandah to the original bar-room, and the bay doorway has been converted into a window. The bay area of the old bar-room has been partitioned off to provide a small office space for the management.

The public bar has been relocated to the western side of the hotel, allowing for the previously enclosed eastern rooms to be opened up [creating a more open and tropical atmosphere, in contrast to the early European fashion of smaller, separate rooms]. The new location of the bar room takes in the original position of the public lounge, store room, original entry passage and two-thirds of the front verandah, allowing for a larger public area which can accommodate a billiard table and bench room for patrons. A small servery area has been built between the new bar and dining room, directly in front of the internal cold room. The new bar area provides modern TAB and KENO facilities.

A false ceiling has been built in the new lounge area that once housed the bar rooms and provides SKY-Channel viewing for guests. Access is still available to the eastern verandah from this new lounge, and its area is defined by placement of lattice work, which runs down one side of the old passageway. The old proprietors quarters, which had been converted into guest lounges, then a lounge and office area, have been opened up with the removal of all internal partitions, and now houses an assortment of gaming machines. At the end of the original passageway, a female toilet has been built onto the verandah, with dual access to both the lounge area and garden lounge via the verandah.

The dining room has been enlarged by removing the partition to the adjacent store room on the western side of the building, with a new doorway to the back verandah added and the old under-stair doorway closed off. The kitchen has been updated by replacing the original brick fireplace with a modern gas appliance.

The scullery has been converted to male and female toilet facilities, the washroom updated to a modern laundry and storage room and the man's room converted to men's toilets. A smaller cold room has been built adjacent to this wash room for service to the outside garden lounge servery. An ATM has been installed within the stairwell.

Access to the first floor is via the original red cedar turning timber staircase with turned newel and balusters. In the stairwell is located six windows grouped to form a picture or feature window. Three smaller windows, two square on either side of a rectangular window, are located above a group of three large rectangular windows. The glass panes have been painted. The larger group, two narrow rectangular windows on either side of a wider rectangular windows, are timber framed, sash with original glass panes.

The first floor has a central hallway with room opening off. The floor also has verandas running intermittently around the four sides, adjacent to the rooms. The rooms are all timber lined, some with original ceiling roses. An original brick chimney is located in a room along the northern wing and is easily seen extending from the roof-line. A modern exhaust vent exists externally and parallel to the original chimney structure. The timber verandah posts have simple, decorative brackets, with simple timber balustrade.

The first floor rooms have remained relatively unchanged, with twelve apartments, a store room, linen room and two bathrooms. The most notable additions to the apartments are plumbing and electrical, in the form of ensuites in all rooms, and kitchenettes in some. The two front bay bedrooms are reserved for the proprietors and the hallway that led onto the front balcony has been closed off.

External grounds to the western side and rear of the hotel are now covered by asphalt, and the street level has been raised to abut the verandah, a height of three feet from the original ground level, creating an all-purpose access. The surrounding verandahs remain as raised on stumps from the ground surface. The hotel has some landscaping along the creek on the eastern side.

== Heritage listing ==
Lakes Creek Hotel was listed on the Queensland Heritage Register on 21 October 1992 having satisfied the following criteria.

The place is important in demonstrating the evolution or pattern of Queensland's history.

Constructed in 1895, the Lake's Creek Hotel, the third hotel on the site, is significant in demonstrating the evolution of the village of Lake's Creek in association with the growing cattle industry of Coastal and Central Queensland and establishment of the Central Queensland Meat Preserving Company. A cornerstone for the developing village, the prosperity of the Lake's Creek Hotel has fluctuated with that of the meatworks, whilst remaining a focal point of the local community since the construction of the original public house in 1871.

The place is important in demonstrating the principal characteristics of a particular class of cultural places.

Designed by architects Eaton and Bates, who moved their business to Rockhampton in 1884 to take advantage of the prosperity flowing to Rockhampton from the local goldmine and cattle industries, Lake's Creek Hotel is a good example of Victorian Free Gothic architecture.

The place is important because of its aesthetic significance.

The building incorporates traditional designs and adapting informal styles to create a well-known landmark, important for its aesthetic facade and architectural style.

The place has a strong or special association with a particular community or cultural group for social, cultural or spiritual reasons.

Established to provide for the everyday person, particularly travellers between Rockhampton and Emu Park and the local workers employed by the CQ Meat Preserving Co, Lake's Creek Hotel has a strong association with the local and surrounding community who have used its services since its construction. The hotel's importance has continued unchanged to the present day, offering a glimpse into a social and cultural trend that has remained virtually unchanged in its 132-year history.

The place has a special association with the life or work of a particular person, group or organisation of importance in Queensland's history.

Lake's Creek Hotel has a special association with the Central Queensland Meat Preserving Company and its employees since 1871. The importance of the development of the meat and livestock industry is recognised in Queensland's history, and the hotel occupies a special place in that history for the people who have worked within the cattle industry in all its various forms, from pastoralists, transporters, meatworkers and their families.
