= Rudd Residence =

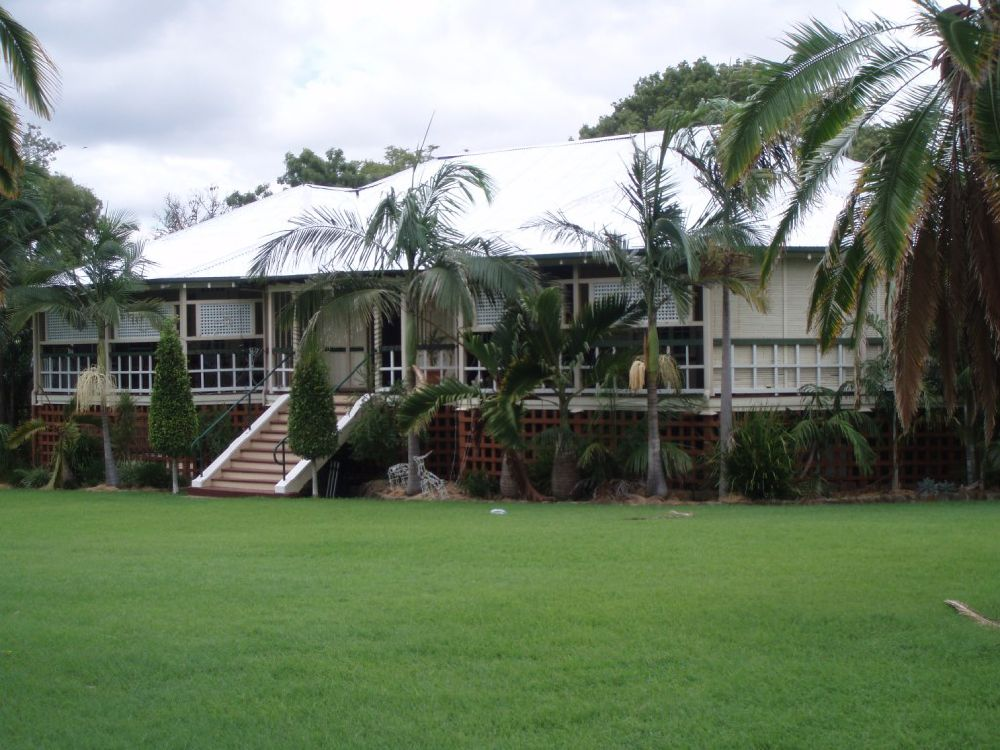
- Rudd Residence, 2009

- Location within Queensland Location within Australia
- 23.3935°S 150.4944°E
- Location: 248 Agnes Street, The Range, Rockhampton, Rockhampton Region, Queensland, Australia

History
- Design period: 1919–1930s (interwar period)
- Built: c. 1923

Queensland Heritage Register
- Official name: Rudd Residence, Mitchell Residence
- Type: state heritage (built, landscape)
- Designated: 22 October 1999
- Reference no.: 601923
- Significant period: 1920s (fabric, historical)
- Significant components: residential accommodation – main house, garden/grounds, lead light/s, views to, trees/plantings

Rudd Residence is a heritage-listed villa at 248 Agnes Street, The Range, Rockhampton, Rockhampton Region, Queensland, Australia. It was built from c. 1923. It is also known as Mitchell Residence. It was added to the Queensland Heritage Register on 22 October 1999.

== History ==
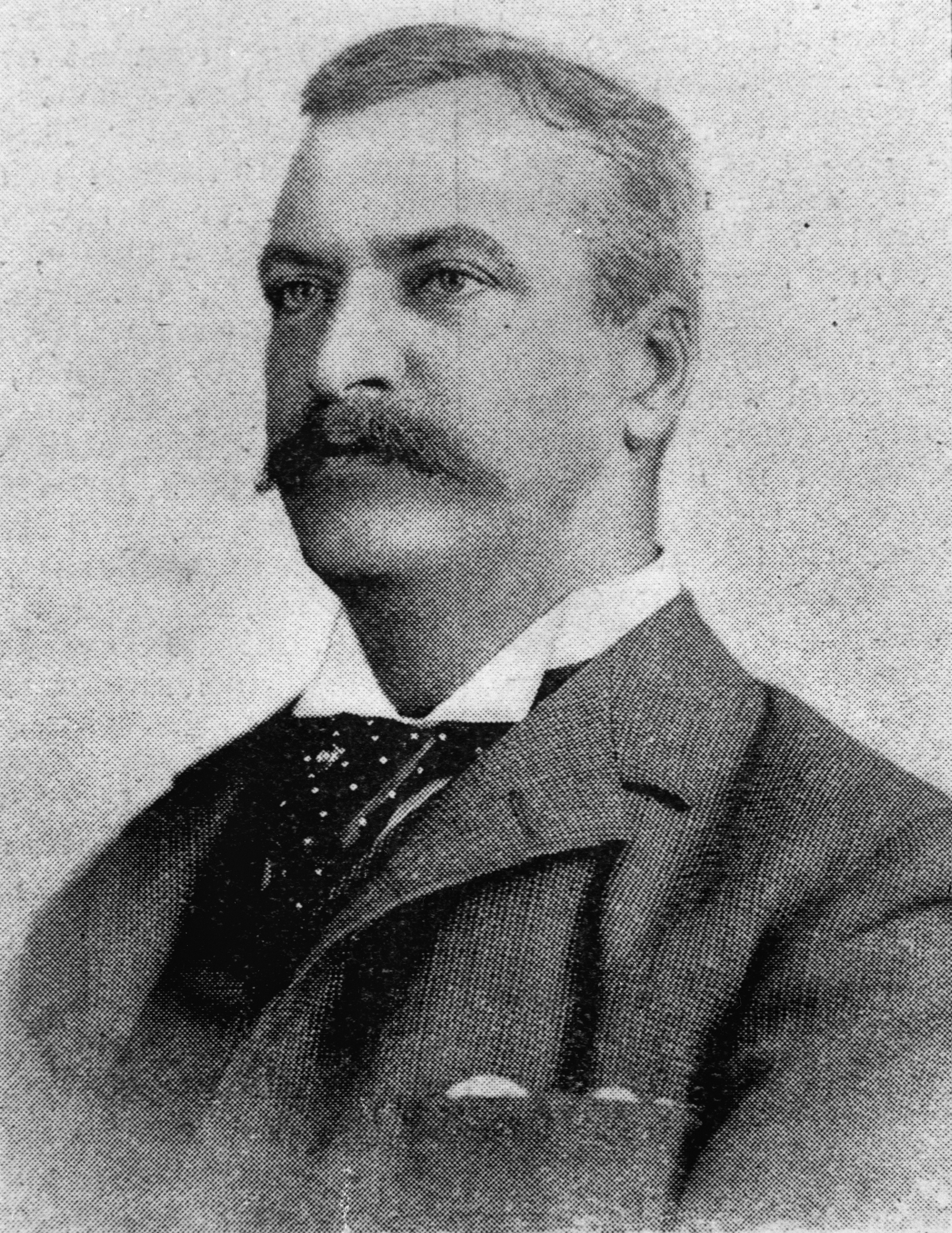
William Henry Rudd, general manager of Walter Reid & Co Ltd, Rockhampton, 1895

The Rudd Residence at 248 Agnes Street, Rockhampton was constructed in about 1923 and is believed to be the design of local architect Beatrice May Hutton. It is a large, high set timber dwelling located on a spacious block originally part of Allotment 47 granted to John Ward and Andrew Bertram in 1862. Frank Rudd, the son of renowned Rockhampton businessman William Henry Rudd, purchased the block, an area of one acre and two perches, in November 1922.

Beatrice May Hutton was born in 1893 and educated at Rockhampton Grammar School. Like many of the women who attempted to enter the male domain of architecture at the time, Beatrice Hutton came from a family with associations in the field. Her father, Falconer West Hutton, was a surveyor and she initially wanted to pursue a career in surveying but had to "accept architecture as the nearest feasible alternative". She became the articled pupil of prominent Rockhampton architect, Edwin Morton Hockings from 1913 until 1916.

In October 1916, Beatrice Hutton became the first female architect to be admitted to the Queensland Institute of Architects. The Sydney architectural journal The Salon announced:

"The Queensland Institute is, we believe, the first Australian Institute of Architecture to admit a lady member...The credentials placed before the Institute Council by the candidate showed that Miss Hutton was an earnest and industrious student, and the application was supported by her principals."

Later in 1916, Hutton moved to Sydney to broaden her experience. From April 1917 she worked for expatriate Queensland architect, Claude William Chambers, becoming a junior partner from 1931 to 1933. The firm was listed for those years as "Chambers and Hutton" in Sands New South Wales Directory and it may be that Beatrice Hutton was the only woman practising as a principal in Sydney at the time. She returned to Rockhampton in 1934 to care for her elderly parents, effectively ending her architectural career. After her father died, Hutton moved to Brisbane with her mother in 1936 and opened an art studio in the Colonial Mutual Life Building in Queen Street where she exhibited and sold her wood carvings. Judith Mackay wrote in 1984 when Hutton was 90 that "Beatrice Hutton currently lives surrounded by an impressive array of her own handwork in wood carving, pottery and rug-making. Her sustained enthusiasm for using her creative skills is inspirational."

It is not yet clear what constituted her contribution to the work of Hockings and Palmer, however, several wide verandahed houses in Rockhampton have been attributed to Hutton's early career. The Rudd Residence is believed to have been designed for a friend of Hutton's, Eliza Dalzell, who was also the daughter of a former client. Hutton had designed a house at 98 Spencer Street in 1915 for Mr Dalzell who was manager of the Bank of Australasia. Hutton is known to have continued to design houses for family and friends after she left for Sydney and the Rudd Residence is thought to be the last surviving intact example of her work.

The Rudd Residence is located in the suburb of The Range, Rockhampton's "premier residential area" that overlooks the river, flood plain and town. The area was sought after by the well-to-do families of Rockhampton from the late nineteenth century onwards. Original allotments of ten acres were located on the crest and eastern slopes of the Range with subdivision commencing in 1882. The Etonville Estate was the first to be subdivided into eighty villa sites. In 1926, the Catholic Church sub-divided the Cathedral Estate on the Range and made available forty seven building lots. These had frontages to Agnes, Bishop, Jessie and Spencer Streets and became the sites of many commodious sub-tropical Rockhampton residences. The development and popularity of the Range was given further impetus by the 1918 flood, the highest recorded in Rockhampton. The Range was well above flood level and serviced by a tram route, had gas, water and telephone services available.

Houses were Hutton's particular interest and like other early women architects, she felt that women had a significant role in designing houses that were suitable for the climate and that utilised labour saving features.

== Description ==
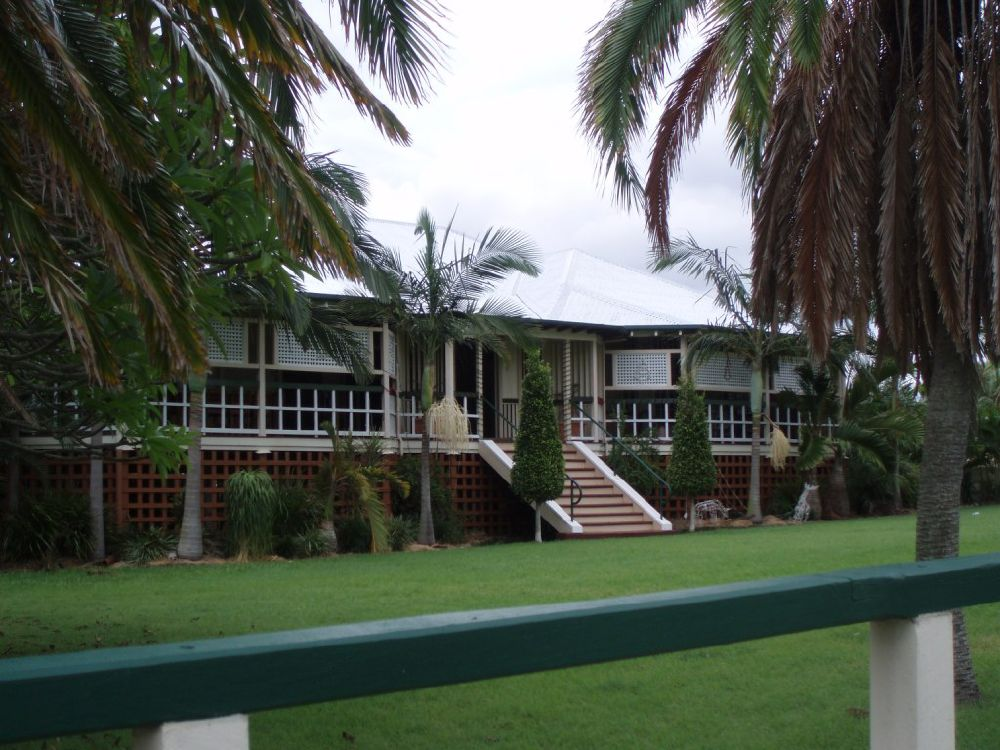
Rudd Residence, 2009

The Rudd Residence is a large, high set, single storeyed timber dwelling located on a large block at the corner of Agnes and Herley Streets, Rockhampton, overlooking the Sisters of Mercy convent and school to the west.

The dwelling is symmetrically composed with a central stair and entrance with broad verandahs on either side. It has a low-pitched hipped corrugated iron roof, divided into three portions that emphasises the symmetry of the front elevation. The house is elevated on tall concrete posts. Simple wide stairs lead to a carefully detailed entrance bay with a low, lined ceiling and double timber doors that feature an elongated oval cutout infilled with a fine timber lattice panel. The entrance bay is enclosed at the back with vertical timber louvres that are fixed to the balustrade. A detail of exposed roof timbers is repeated around the eaves of the building.

The deep verandah to either side of the entry expands to create polygonal, room-like spaces at the corners of the building. Parts of the roof are lined with horizontal timber VJ boards and the hardwood floor has a high gloss finish. Bays with multi-paned windows project into these verandah spaces. The verandah balustrade is composed of a simple timber grid which is reflected in a denser lattice fixed to the concrete posts and infilling the space between floor and ground levels. Panels of finer timber lattice have been fixed to the verandah columns on either side of the entry. On the northern side of the entry, these spaces were previously occupied by full length, rolling bamboo blinds. These blinds are still in place on the northern end of the front verandah and along the side elevation to the north.

The wide front door has a large oval-shaped leadlight, a motif which is continued into the broad fanlight and side panels which also contain oval leadlight windows. The front door opens into an entry vestibule which leads into a large central parlour. On either side of the vestibule there are small square alcoves with leadlight windows and fanlights on three sides that project into the verandah space. The parlour has a stark black-and-white colour scheme. It is lined with narrow, vertical timber VJ boarding to the walls and has a fibrous cement ceiling which continues down to picture rail level. The square motif of the verandah detailing is continued through to the ceiling which has a grid pattern formed of timber cover strips painted black. The bottom two-thirds of the walls are also painted black, as are all architraves and skirting.

On the northern part of the site, an area has been cut and levelled to accommodate a swimming pool. Part of the pool and the paved surround are located under the house. There is a retaining wall on the eastern side of the pool. The part of this wall next to the pool is faced with stone and topped with a timber fence, the section that continues under the house is concrete block. A fibrous cement wall with aluminium-framed windows has been built at the edge of the paved area in the undercroft of the house. A similar wall has been inserted in the area between verandah floor level and ground level to the corner of the house.

The house is set back from the road in a large expanse of lawn with six prominent Canary Island date palms and two mature frangipani trees. The back section of the block is more densely vegetated with a variety of trees and shrubs.

== Heritage listing ==
The Rudd Residence was listed on the Queensland Heritage Register on 22 October 1999 having satisfied the following criteria.

The place is important in demonstrating the evolution or pattern of Queensland's history.

The Rudd Residence, a large, high set, timber dwelling constructed c. 1923 in Rockhampton, is significant for its association with the development of Rockhampton, in particular the premier suburb of the Range, popular with the affluent families of the city from the late nineteenth century onwards.

The place has potential to yield information that will contribute to an understanding of Queensland's history.

The Rudd Residence has potential to yield information about the entry of women into the professions in Queensland, in particular into the architectural profession. The Rudd Residence also has the potential to yield information about the work of Beatrice May Hutton, the first woman admitted to the Queensland Institute of Architects and probably the first woman admitted to an architectural institute in Australia.

The place is important because of its aesthetic significance.

The Rudd Residence is important for its aesthetic and architectural qualities as a well composed and refined example of a timber residence designed for the sub-tropical Queensland climate. The expansive, well screened verandah with its variety of spaces and simple timber detailing and the many leadlight windows are particularly fine features of the house. The landscape setting of the house, including mature planting at the front, is also a significant feature.
