= List of heritage-listed buildings in Rockhampton =

This is a list of heritage-listed buildings in Rockhampton, Queensland, organised by suburb:

== Allenstown ==
Heritage-listed buildings in Allenstown:

- 36 Larnach Street: St Marks Church
- Upper Dawson Road: South Rockhampton Cemetery
- 170 William Street: St Josephs Cathedral

== Berserker ==
Heritage-listed buildings in Berserker:

- 20 Bridge Street: North Rockhampton Borough Chambers
- 278 Ford Street: St John's Church

== Rockhampton City ==
Heritage-listed buildings in Rockhampton City (the central business district):

- 166 Alma Street: Shandon (residence)
- Archer Street: Training Depot Drill Hall Complex
- Bolsover Street: Block A, Rockhampton Technical College
- Bolsover Street: GS Curtis Stores (also known as AMV Warehouse)
- 230 Bolsover Street: Rockhampton School of Arts
- 201 Bolsover Street: Schotia Place
- 232 Bolsover Street: Rockhampton Town Hall
- 280 Bolsover Street: St Andrew's Presbyterian Church
- Denison Street: Archer Park Railway Station
- 233 Denison Street: Railway Administration Building
- 42 East Street: Rockhampton Courthouse
- 80 East Street: Rockhampton Post Office
- 183 East Street: AMP Building
- 187 East Street: John M Headrick & Co Building
- 203 East Street: Walter Reid Community Arts Centre
- 112–114 Kent Street: Rockhampton Masonic Hall
- 150 Quay Street: Criterion Hotel
- 162–164 Quay Street: Bulletin Building
- 166 Quay Street: Rockhampton Club
- 170 Quay Street: Trustee Chambers
- 174 Quay Street: C J Edwards Chambers
- 178 Quay Street: Rees R & Sydney Jones Building
- 180 Quay Street: Cattle House
- 182 Quay Street: Australian Estates Building
- 186 Quay Street: Queensland National Bank
- 194 Quay Street: Royal Bank of Queensland
- 206 Quay Street: Archer Chambers
- 208 Quay Street: Customs House
- 230 Quay Street: Heritage Tavern
- 232–234 Quay Street: Cahill's Stores
- 236 Quay Street: ABC Radio Studios
- 238 Quay Street: Goldsbrough Mort Building
- 248 Quay Street: Avonleigh
- 250 Quay Street: Clewett's Building
- 260 Quay Street: Walter Reid Court
- 288 Quay Street: Harbour Board Building
- 89 William Street: St Paul's Anglican Cathedral
- 89 William Street: St Paul's Cathedral Hall

== Nerimbera ==
Heritage-listed buildings in Nerimbera:

- St Christophers Chapel Road: St Christophers Chapel

== Park Avenue ==
Heritage-listed sites in Park Avenue:

- North Coast railway line over the Fitzroy River between Park Avenue and Wandal: Alexandra Railway Bridge

== The Range ==
Heritage-listed buildings in The Range:

- 155 Agnes Street: Rockhampton Girls Grammar School
- 248 Agnes Street: Rudd Residence
- 263 Agnes Street: The Range Convent and High School
- Archer Street: Rockhampton Grammar School
- Canning Street: Medical superintendent's residence within the Rockhampton Base Hospital
- Canning Street: Therapies Building (incorporating Sister Elizabeth Kenny's Clinic) within the Rockhampton Base Hospital
- 49 Jessie Street: Amla (house)
- 30 Nathan Street: Wiseman's Cottage
- Penlington Street: Rockhampton War Memorial
- 100 Spencer Street: Rockhampton Botanic Gardens
- 25 Ward Street: Clancholla
- 31 Ward Street: Kenmore House
- 74 Ward Street: Yungaba Migrant Hostel
- 86 Ward Street: Killowen, Rockhampton

== Wandal ==
Heritage-listed sites in Wandal:

- North Coast railway line over the Fitzroy River between Wandal and Park Avenue: Alexandra Railway Bridge

== West Rockhampton ==
Heritage-listed buildings in West Rockhampton:

- Canoona Road: St Aubins (house)
