= Royal Bank of Queensland, Rockhampton =

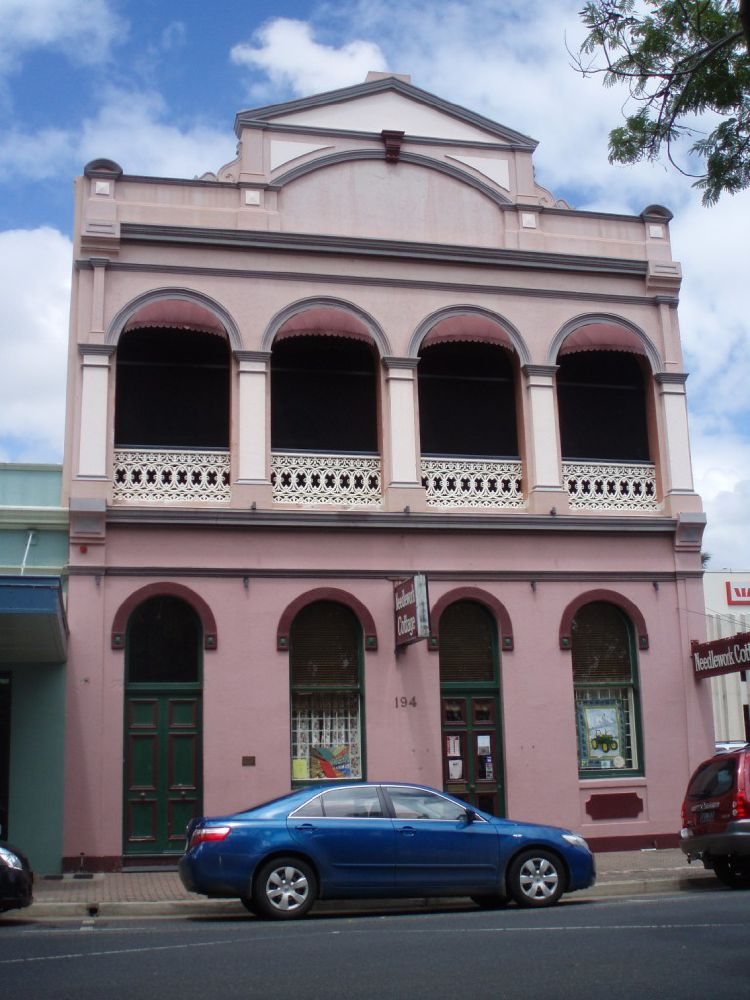
- Former Royal Bank of Queensland, Rockhampton, 2009

- Location within Queensland Location within Australia
- 23.3781°S 150.5144°E
- Location: 194 Quay Street, Rockhampton, Rockhampton Region, Queensland, Australia

History
- Design period: 1870s–1890s (late 19th century)
- Built: 1888

Queensland Heritage Register
- Official name: Royal Bank Building (former), Diamonds & Pearls, Rivers Restaurant, Winchcombe Carson
- Type: state heritage (built)
- Designated: 21 October 1992
- Reference no.: 600808
- Significant period: ?–1880s (fabric); 1887–1958 (historical use as bank)
- Significant components: banking chamber, strong room, loggia/s, fireplace, residential accommodation – manager's house/quarters

The Royal Bank of Queensland Building is a heritage-listed former bank building at 194 Quay Street, Rockhampton, Rockhampton Region, Queensland, Australia. It was built in 1888. It is also known as Diamonds & Pearls, Rivers Restaurant, and Winchcombe Carson. It was added to the Queensland Heritage Register on 21 October 1992.

== History ==
The former Royal Bank building at 194 Quay Street, Rockhampton was constructed to its present form when a second storey and other extensions were added to an existing building on the site in July 1888. The additions were designed by prominent Rockhampton architect John William Wilson (1865–1899) and built by Wakefield McLean & Co.

The land was originally owned by the early settler William Archer who purchased the site at a sale of Crown Land in November 1858 as Allotment 2 of Section 46, Parish of Rockhampton. The property was thought to have been used by the Rockhampton Morning Bulletin from 1861–62 until the building was destroyed by fire. The Royal Bank of Queensland purchased subdivision 1 of Lot 2 of Section 46 in June 1887. The bank operated its business from a building on that property until mid-1888 when it temporarily relocated to the former premises of the Commercial Bank of Sydney in Denham Street during the construction of the additions.

The Queensland-owned Royal Bank was established in Brisbane late in the recession year of 1885. The Royal Bank was promoted as an alternative to the hugely successful Queensland National Bank. By early 1889, the Royal Bank had established 20 branches and agencies (Rockhampton 1887), including branches in London and Edinburgh, proving to be a viable competitor of the Queensland National Bank into the 1910s. In Rockhampton the Royal Bank was situated amongst the other leading banks on Quay Street including the Queensland National Bank, the Union Bank of Australia (now Cattle House) and the former Bank of New South Wales as well as numerous leading mercantile companies.

Tenders for the construction of the additions to the Rockhampton Royal Bank were called from May to June 1888 and work was commenced in July. A description of Wilson's plans printed in the Daily Northern Argus of 5 July 1888 said the alterations included "a second storey on the present building" and an extension of six rooms on the ground floor at the back of the "present" building. The front elevation was to be 35 feet (11 m) high with an arcaded balcony on the upper floor finished with cement. The ground floor provided a banking chamber (25 by 30 feet (7.6 m × 9.1 m)), with a strong room, manager's room, large dining room, lavatories, and a private entrance hall. The two front rooms were to be divided by folding doors which provided a 20 by 30 feet (6.1 m × 9.1 m) room when thrown open. The building was to be completed in four months.

John William Wilson dominated the architectural scene in Rockhampton from 1864 until the 1890s. His work contributed significantly to the consistency of the Rockhampton townscape with six of the Quay Street buildings erected before 1901 being Wilson's design. Wilson designed over 200 buildings in the central Queensland region during his 35-year practice and was one of the most prominent and prolific architects to have worked in Rockhampton.

The former bank was located in Rockhampton's principal business district which developed along Quay Street in the late 19th century to serve the passing trade at the wharves. Rockhampton had operated as a port since 1858 and had been the main centre for transport and trade in Central Queensland. A phase of increased development and rebuilding was apparent in Rockhampton during the 1880s generated by the immense wealth produced from the Mount Morgan gold mine discovered in the 1882. The extension of the Royal Bank building to its present form in 1888 was a reflection of this boom in Rockhampton.

In 1903 the Brisbane to Gladstone railway was opened and from this time the diminishing importance of the port caused the wharves to fall into disrepair and the development of the area to become more closely tied to the city centre. The building functioned as the Royal Bank until 1917 when the Royal Bank of Queensland merged with the Bank of North Queensland to form the Bank of Queensland which in turn was absorbed by the National Bank of Australasia in 1922. In 1958 the selling brokers, Winchcombe Carson Ltd, purchased the building and in 1980 the building was transferred to Dalgety Australia Ltd. The property was resold in November 1980 and subsequently leased as the office for the Minister of Works and Housing of the State of Queensland from 1983 to 1991. The building was sold again in 1993. At the time of purchase the building was intended for the dual use as a residence and beauty salon/finishing school. At this time the timber deck was installed at the back of the building and the arched openings in the ground floor dining room were installed. The building was converted to a restaurant in 1996.

== Description ==
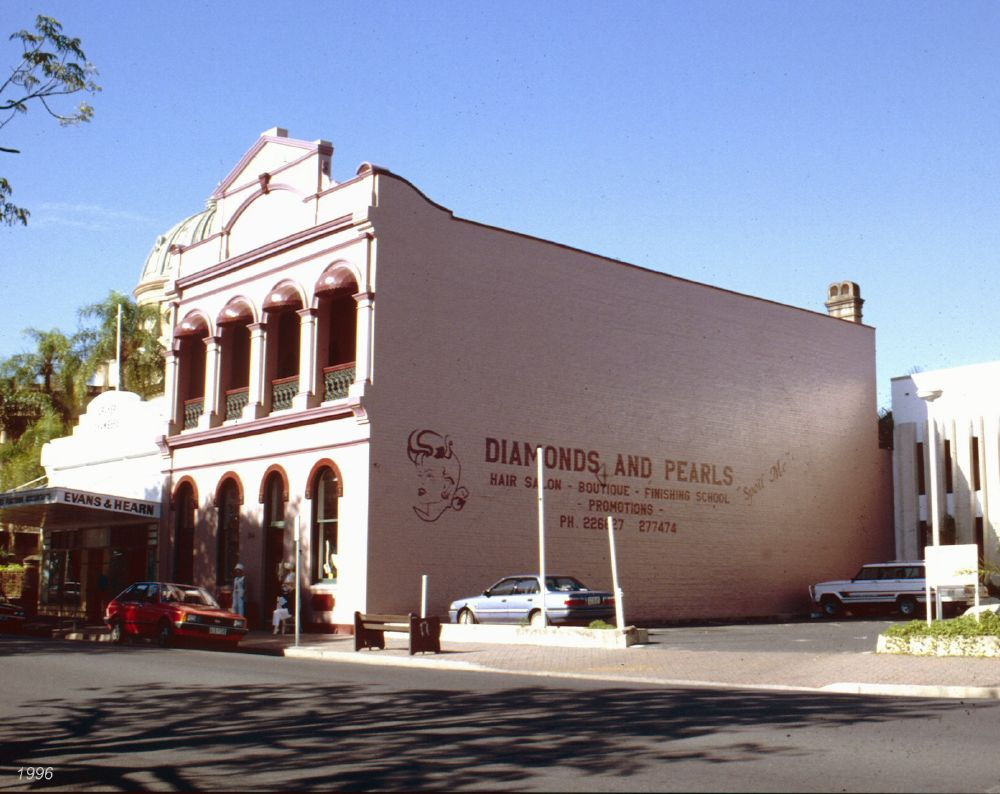
Former Royal Bank of Queensland, 1996

The former Royal Bank building is a two-storeyed rendered masonry structure located fronting Quay Street to the northeast overlooking the Fitzroy River. The building adjoins Archer Chambers to the southeast.

The Quay Street elevation has four arched openings to the ground floor, with the entrance to the first floor located at the southern end consisting of paired timber panelled doors with an arched fanlight. The entrance to the ground floor consists of a timber framed door with glass panels and an arched fanlight, flanked by arched sash windows surmounting recessed wall panels. Each arched opening is surmounted by a rendered moulding, and a shallow cornice separates the ground and first floors.

The first floor has an arcaded balcony fronting Quay Street, consisting of four arches with expressed impost and extrados, and cast iron balustrades with timber handrails. The first floor is surmounted by a shaped gable, consisting of a central triangular pediment supported by pilasters above a curved pediment with expressed keystone ornament. The pediment is flanked by a low parapet with corner pillars.

The rear wall of the building has casement windows with segmental arched fanlights to the first floor, flanking a central door with a cantilevered metal framed landing and stair accessing a rear first floor deck. A ground floor rear courtyard is enclosed by a storage and office building fronting Quay Lane.

Internally, the ground floor has an entrance hall and stair on the southern side, with a dining room fronting Quay Street on the northern side, and a bar, sitting area and kitchen at the rear fronting a courtyard. A masonry cross wall separates the front and rear areas, with access provided by two arches with pilasters flanking a decorative wall niche. The original strongroom is located centrally on the northern side, and is used as a store. Ceilings are finished with compressed sheeting, and masonry walls are rendered. The rear bar and sitting area opens via French doors to a courtyard, which is mostly covered by a first floor deck, and which contains toilets, stair and access to the rear store and office building. The entrance hall has a timber stair with turned balusters, newel posts and timber handrails, a boarded timber ceiling, and rear access to the bar area via an office under the stair landing.

The first floor has a dining room and bar fronting the Quay Street arcaded balcony, with amenities located centrally, and a function room and kitchen at the rear with access to a deck above the ground floor courtyard. The Quay Street dining room has decorative plaster ceiling details, and consists of two rooms joined by a large opening with timber architraves. Four sets of French doors with arched fanlights open onto the arcaded balcony, and large folding timber doors provide access to the function room at the rear. The balcony has a boarded timber ceiling and tiled floor. The function room has a fireplace with a timber surround in the western corner, and a suspended acoustic tile ceiling. A central hallway accesses the rear of the building, with timber panelled doors with fanlights and architraves opening into adjacent rooms. A timber panelled door with arched glass fanlight and sidelights separates the rear of the hallway from the entrance stair.

The rear store and office building fronting Quay Lane is constructed of concrete block with a sheet metal roof.

== Heritage listing ==
The former Royal Bank Building was listed on the Queensland Heritage Register on 21 October 1992 having satisfied the following criteria.

The place is important in demonstrating the evolution or pattern of Queensland's history.

The former Royal Bank building, forms part of the historic Quay Street precinct which is distinguished by its late 19th century commercial buildings. The Quay Street precinct stands as a legacy to the Port of Rockhampton which served the vast area of central Queensland from 1858 and was influential in establishing Rockhampton as the premier commercial city of central Queensland. The river wharves fostered the substantial commercial development along Quay Street, enabling it to become the principal business district of the city. The solidity of the buildings were a symbol of Rockhampton's wealth, later boosted by the Mount Morgan gold rush of the 1880s, and reflected the confidence with which the community and developers viewed Rockhampton's future.

The place is important because of its aesthetic significance.

The former Royal Bank building, through its form, scale and materials, makes a strong aesthetic contribution to the streetscape of Quay Street. There is a continuity of cornices and parapets between the former Royal Bank building and the adjacent Archer Chambers which emphasises the nineteenth century character of the street and quayside.

The place has a special association with the life or work of a particular person, group or organisation of importance in Queensland's history.

The building has special association for the people of Rockhampton through its significant aesthetic and historic contribution to Quay Street, which for many is the symbol of Rockhampton and is very closely associated with the image of the city.
