= St Aubins, Rockhampton =

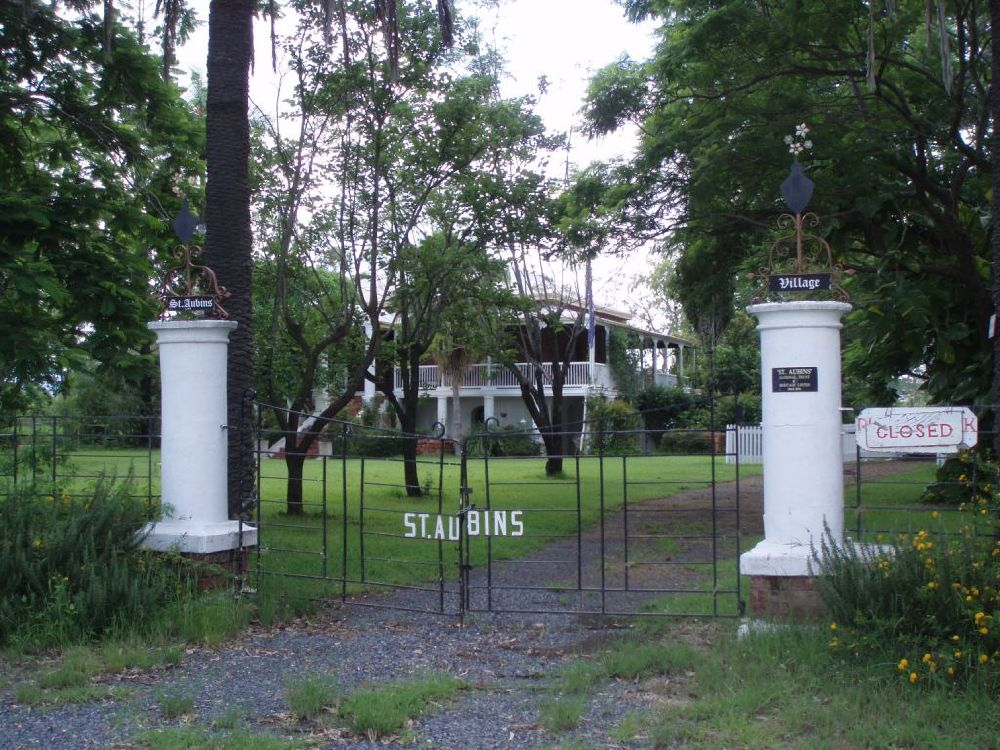
- St Aubins, seen from Canoona Road, 2009

- Location within Queensland Location within Australia
- 23.3748°S 150.4802°E
- Location: 75 Canoona Road, West Rockhampton, Rockhampton, Rockhampton Region, Queensland, Australia

History
- Design period: 1870s–1890s (late 19th century)
- Built: c. 1889

Queensland Heritage Register
- Official name: St Aubins
- Type: state heritage (landscape, built)
- Designated: 21 October 1992
- Reference no.: 600790
- Significant period: 1880s–1890s (fabric); 1880s–1920s (historical)
- Significant components: residential accommodation – main house, residential accommodation – servants' quarters, garden/grounds, attic, steps/stairway, tank – water (underground), basement / sub-floor

St Aubins is a heritage-listed detached house at 75 Canoona Road, West Rockhampton, Rockhampton, Rockhampton Region, Queensland, Australia. It was built c. 1889. It was added to the Queensland Heritage Register on 21 October 1992.

== History ==
St Aubins is believed to have been designed and erected c. 1889 by John (Johann) Rodekirchen. The house site adjoins what remains of the clay pit and brick-making complex which Roderkirchen operated at Lion Creek, West Rockhampton, on land owned by local merchant and politician Albrecht Feez MLA.

Born in Cologne in 1846, Johann Rodekirchen migrated from Hamburg to Rockhampton with his wife Eleanore and two children aboard the Fritz Reuter in October 1877. The Rodekirchen family was part of the boom in immigration that occurred in Queensland as a consequence of government attempts to boost development through population. For a time in the early 1880s the rate of increase in Queensland's population exceeded that of all other colonies and efforts to attract immigrants from Germany were particularly successful. Merchant Albrecht Feez was the representative of the German community in Rockhampton at the time.

Shipping records describe John (Johann) Rodekirchen as a worker or arbeiter, aged thirty years. Little is known of his early years, but Rodekirchen may have been one of the six brick-making works which a Capricornian correspondent reported were operating in the Lion Creek area by late 1885.

Such was the wealth in Rockhampton during the decade of the 1880s that the demand for bricks was considerable. Founded in October 1858, the city steadily had increased in importance as a trading centre for Central Queensland. After 1882, when gold was discovered at nearby Mount Morgan, many substantial buildings which displayed the local area's increasing wealth and importance were constructed in Rockhampton.

One of those who profited by owning shares in what was then reportedly the richest single gold mine in the world was Albrecht Feez. A well-known merchant and politician, Feez was born in Bavaria in 1826. Before following his brother Adolphe to Australia in 1852, Albrecht Feez had served as an artilleryman in the Schleswig-Holstein war. The newly arrived Feez worked as a gold-miner, timber-getter, jackaroo and wool-broker before establishing a store in Quay Street, Rockhampton, in 1859. During the following decade his business outgrew this site, after which Albrecht Feez moved to East Street. There he sold wines, spirits, tea, sugar, hardware and what he described in advertisements as "special lines for squatters". During the 1870s and 1880s Feez was closely involved with the community of Rockhampton, as a key figure in the German community, Mayor of Rockhampton in 1879 and representative for Leichhardt in the Queensland Legislative Assembly between 1880 and 1883.

Albrecht Feez's ownership of the land on which John Rodekirchen operated his brickworks passed to his sons Adolph and Arthur Feez in 1887. Title to the land was not obtained by John Rodekirchen until 1923.

From the mid to late 1880s, Rodekirchen's Lion Creek kilns supplied bricks not only for his own house, to be named St Aubins by a subsequent owner, but also for a number of the imposing commercial and institutional premises constructed in the city. The list is believed to include Kenmore House (the residence constructed in 1894 by John Ferguson) and Block A of the Rockhampton Technical College (constructed in 1914).

The bricks used in St Aubins are handmade. This labour-intensive process used in the late 1880s kept the price of bricks at £5 to £6 per thousand. By 1895, however, Rodekirchen had mechanised his brick-making. In April of that year he advertised large stocks of machine-made bricks at "bottom price". Following mechanisation the price of bricks in Rockhampton dropped to £1 12s 6d per thousand.

Exactly what type of machine assistance Rodekirchen used in unknown, although it was sophisticated enough to produce a constant supply of uniform bricks with the frog (manufacturer's mark) "Rodekirchen Rockhampton". Firing occurred in the kilns on site. In a February 1988 Morning Bulletin article, Rodekirchen's granddaughter Ethel Lloyd recalled that the "bricks would be put into the kiln and the front of it would be plastered with clay. All the men in the district would help with the burning which went on all through the night." Afterwards the kiln was allowed a few days to cool down.

The Rodekirchen family is believed to have lived at first in the small weatherboard cottage still on the property. The solid brick house they built to replace it featured two external staircases, one to the south that faced the pit and kilns and the other, which was the main staircase for the house, facing west. Ethel Lloyd's reminiscences suggest that, as originally constructed, the rendered brick stairs on the southern facade finished at a landing approximately one metre below the level of the verandah. Subsequent owners have speculated that at some time the stairs may have separated at this point and joined the verandah on each side. An undated, early photograph featured in the 1988 Morning Bulletin article showed an opening in the balustrading that is filled by a long piece of similarly styled gate. It also suggests that ornately carved timber brackets were fitted to the verandah posts at least until the 1930s. The balustrading appears very similar to that which is currently in place.

A second early photograph featured in the 1988 Morning Bulletin article also shows that a front gate and fence were constructed on the property's western boundary. Two date palms, which are still in place as at 2003, are visible in this photograph. The photograph further suggests that there was established planting on the property at this time.

Rodekirchen's house and brickworks were inundated by Rockhampton's highest flood on record during the months of January and February 1918. The damage was repaired and Rodekirchen continued making bricks until 1926 when, aged eighty, he transferred the business to his son, also named John. In July 1931 the elder Rodekirchen died.

Although the brickworks remained with the family at this time, the Rodekirchen house was sold in June 1934. A succession of owners followed. In 1952 Henry and Elise Brett purchased the property. It is believed they named the house St Aubins in remembrance of ancestors who had left France at the time of the French Revolution.

The Bleines family who purchased St Aubins in January 1970 restored it as a family home as the centerpiece of a tourist business and nursery specialising in herbs. The property, and that adjoining it on Canoona Street where the clay pit is located, currently operates as a "historical village" where customers can view a number of timber buildings relocated from central Rockhampton alongside relics found on the site, or purchase and consume light refreshments.

In November 2015, St Aubins and associated historical village was for sale for $1.1M.

== Description ==
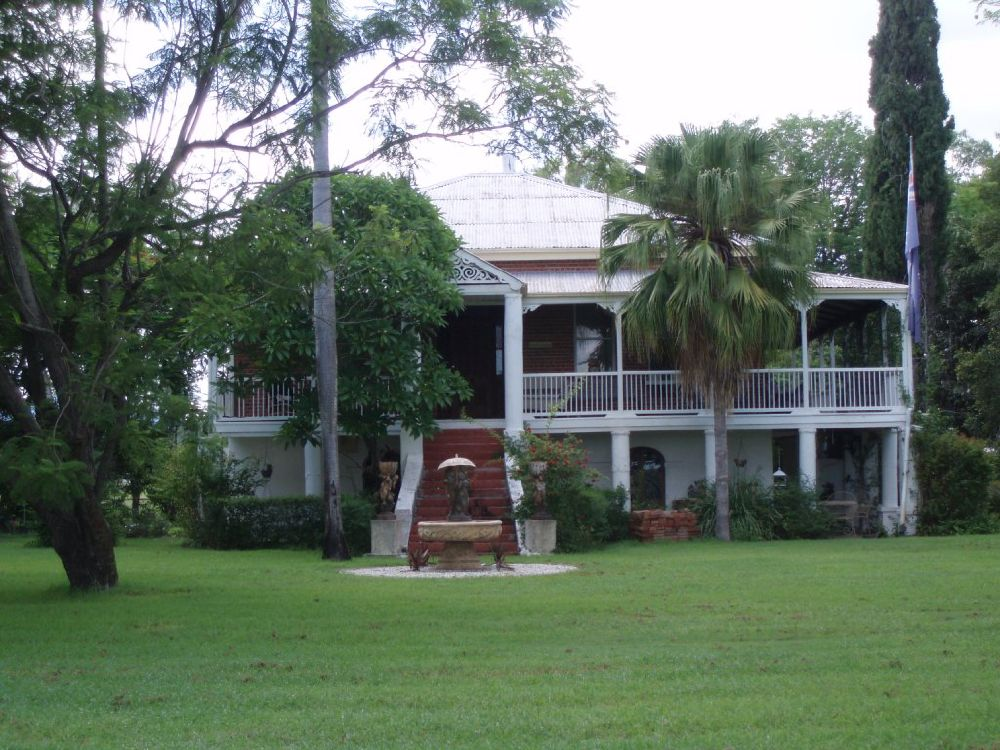
St Aubins, main house, 2009

St Aubins is sited on two large allotments, the total area of which is almost 8,100 square metres (87,000 sq ft). They are located at the corner of Canoona and Kalare Streets on the western fringe of Rockhampton opposite the airport and near Lion Creek. It is an idiosyncratically designed two-storeyed, brick house with approximately three metre wide upper level verandahs on three sides-facing the east, west and south. The main roof is a short-ridged hip, while the skillion roofs to the verandahs are separate and hipped at their corners. The verandahs can be accessed on the southern and western facades via two single flights of stairs. The main entry stairs are constructed of rendered brick and their total width is approximately 2.5 metres (8 ft 2 in). They are covered by a small gabled roof, which connects to the verandah roof of the western facade and is supported by two large circular columns. These columns rest on square plinths that form part of the low, rendered balustrades on each side of the stairs. The gable end is in-filled with a carved timber fretwork panel. Its bargeboard is also carved. The ceiling of the porch roof is lined with painted timber boards. The girth of the columns appears over scaled in comparison to the width of the porch roof. The second flight of stairs is of a similar width to the main one, with low rendered balustrades on each side, and exposed brick risers and treads. It is not roofed. All roofs are clad in corrugated iron.

The timber-framed verandahs are supported by rendered circular columns, the widths of which match those to the main stairs. However, at each corner the columns are square. All sit on a rectangular rendered plinth. The verandah roofs are supported on tapering stop chamfered timber posts that are positioned above the large columns. These supports are spaced at intervals of approximately 3 metres (9.8 ft). Ornately carved timber brackets, different to those shown in the 1988 Morning Bulletin photograph, are fixed to the unpainted verandah beams and either side of the painted timber verandah posts. The timber balustrading consists of dowel pieces fitted between a top and bottom rail. The framing to the underside of the upper storey verandahs and their roofs is exposed. The verandah floors are lined with unpainted shot-edge timber boards.

The external walls to the ground storey are rendered. The French doors and windows on each of these facades have basket arch-shaped heads. A simply moulded impost marks the springing point of these arches. The ground floor walls are approximately 40 centimetres (16 in) thick. On the north facade a triangular, rendered support has been put in place. An early in-ground, brick-lined water tank is situated under the edge of the verandah on the southern facade.

On the upper storey, the brickwork of the thick external walls is exposed. The main entry door, leading off the covered stairway, has narrow sidelights and a rectangular highlight. The three windows on the unsheltered northern facade have gently arched heads and curved hoods with ornately carved timber brackets supporting them. They also have rendered sills. The windows on the other three facades have matching heads and sills. All are double-hung sashes with single lights in each sash.

=== Interiors ===
The ground storey is divided by a central hallway that links the western and eastern sides of the house. The ceilings to this level have exposed timber joists behind which are fitted tongue-and-groove timber boards. If this is an original feature, it suggests that the lower level was intended for service or storage purposes only. All walls appear to be plastered. The internal ones are of a similar thickness to those on the exterior. On the southern side of the hall is a large rectangular room, used currently as a lounge. The exposed joists to its ceiling are supported by a bearer resting on a number of large timber posts. On the northern side are two rooms, one a kitchen and the other a study. The openings out of these rooms into the central hall have basket-shaped arches. A timber stair connects the lounge to the level above. The severed ends of a number of joists are visible in at least one stairwell wall. The doors opening onto either end of the central hallway have square highlights above them, and narrow sidelights. A small bathroom addition has been built against the eastern verandah facade.

The overall layout of the upper storey is very similar to that described above. A central hall opens off the main entry door on the western facade of the house. To the north of this hall are located three equal sized rooms. In the south-west corner is a study, where the stairs from the lower level arrive. A large space is made on the south-eastern corner where the hall opens out. The current owners have installed a bathroom at the end of the hall, on the east-facing verandah. The ceiling to the study is lined with tongue-and-groove timber boards. There are also painted timber cornices fitted.

The manner in which the internal spaces of both levels are arranged, in particular the stairs opening into an upper-storey room rather than a vestibule or hallway, and the relationship between these and the verandah stairs, suggests that extensive alterations have been made to the original layout of the house. It is difficult to ascertain from this evidence how the early house functioned.

=== Grounds ===
The corner allotment on which the house sits is accessed from Canoona Street. Each side of the entranceway is framed by two posts connected to one another by a low brick wall capped with painted render. The innermost posts are rendered, elongated cylinders, while the outermost are square and capped as are the low walls. These items can be seen in the photograph from the 1988 Morning Bulletin article. The entrance is additionally framed by two tall date palms (Phoenix dactylifera L.) located inside the boundary fence line. These are also visible in the early photograph featured in the above article.

A small timber house is located to the east of St Aubins, and a plaque states that it was used before the main residence was constructed and then later as servant's quarters. It has a main gable roof, the ridge of which runs east to west, and a separate skillion roof over the verandah. The roofs are clad in corrugated iron, with two dormer windows in the southern face of the gable. The building is clad in weatherboards and the on-ground verandah faces south. A second early, in-ground, brick-lined water tank is situated adjacent to this building's verandah on the south.

Within the grounds of the St Aubins property, a number of timber structures have been relocated from elsewhere during the tenure of the current owners. These buildings do not comprise part of the historical significance of the property. They are largely clad in weatherboards with corrugated iron roofs. Also, the current owners have constructed a small brick building with a hipped roof clad in corrugated Colorbond steel. A driveway leads from the Canoona Street entry and between the southern face of the house and the adjacent collection of "village" buildings. A timber picket fence separates the two areas. In the south-west corner of the property sits the most notable of the relocated structures. It is reputed to be the original Steam Tram Ticket Office originally situated near the Fitzroy River Bridge and Purrey Cottage (Purrey being the name of the French manufacturer of Rockhampton's Steam Tram fleet). The house has a gable roof that extends over a verandah facing Canoona Street to the west. There is a skillion-roofed addition to the eastern facade. All roofs appear to be clad in corrugated iron. On its northern, southern and eastern facades the building appears to be clad in weatherboards. However, on the facade to the verandah the framing is exposed with vertical timber boards behind. The building sits on low timber stumps. The roof edge to the verandah is supported on plain timber posts, between which are cross-braces fitted between a timber top and bottom rail.

The site is heavily treed, except for a wide expanse of lawn to the west of the house. Two established Jacaranda trees sit between the north-west corners of the house and the allotment. A large native pine tree sits between the northern face of the house and the Kalare Street boundary. The second of the early photographs featured in the 1988 Morning Bulletin article suggests that part of the property was densely covered with trees as it is in 2003, but it is not possible to ascertain which remain from this earlier planting scheme, other than the date palms at the entry gate. The remains of a large clay pit are located on the two southerly adjacent allotments. These are not included in the heritage listing for St Aubins.

== Heritage listing ==
St Aubins was listed on the Queensland Heritage Register on 21 October 1992 having satisfied the following criteria.

The place is important in demonstrating the evolution or pattern of Queensland's history.

The residence St Aubins is important in demonstrating the pattern of Queensland's history because of its links, at a time of significant growth, with Rockhampton's built fabric.

The place has potential to yield information that will contribute to an understanding of Queensland's history.

With the solid manner of its design and construction, attributed to German immigrant John Rodekirchen, St Aubins has the potential to yield further information on the adaptation of European living styles to a Queensland setting.

The place has a special association with the life or work of a particular person, group or organisation of importance in Queensland's history.

In particular, St Aubins has a special association of over thirty-five years with the working life of John Rodekirchen. As a maker of bricks, Rodekirchen is representative of the skilled workers involved in the construction of Rockhampton's built heritage.
