= Rees R & Sydney Jones Building =

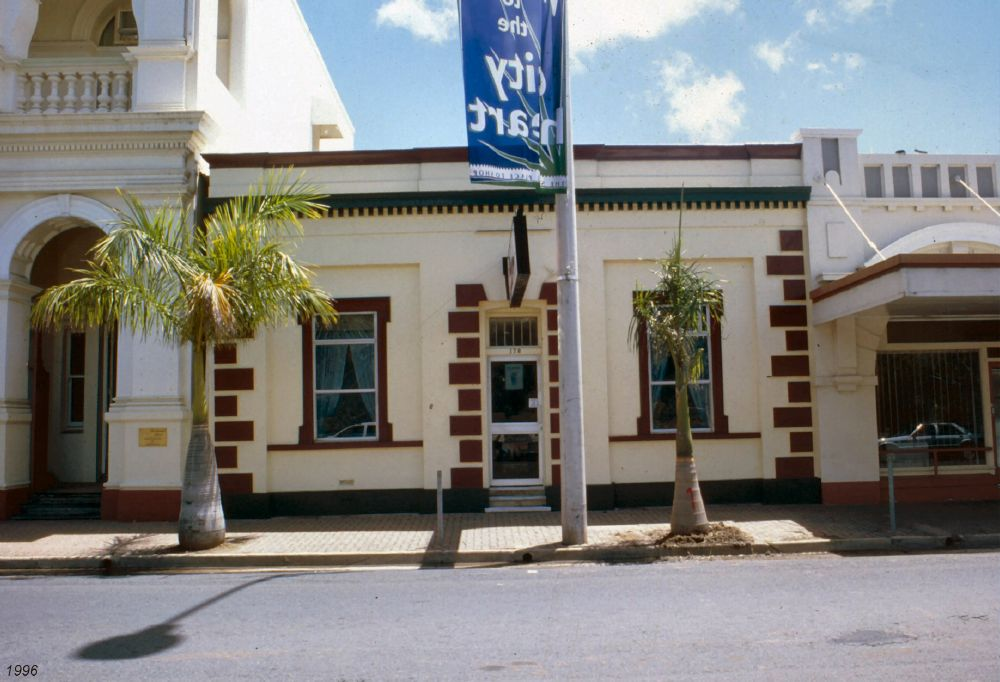
- Building in 1996

- Location within Queensland Location within Australia
- 23.3772°S 150.5138°E
- Location: 178 Quay Street, Rockhampton, Rockhampton Region, Queensland, Australia

History
- Design period: 1870s–1890s (late 19th century)
- Built: c. 1886–1960s

Queensland Heritage Register
- Official name: Callianiotis Constructions, Rees R & Sydney Jones
- Type: state heritage (built)
- Designated: 21 October 1992
- Reference no.: 600804
- Significant period: 1880s (fabric) c. 1886–1976 (historical use as legal offices)
- Significant components: safe

Rees R & Sydney Jones Building is a heritage-listed office building at 178 Quay Street, Rockhampton, Rockhampton Region, Queensland, Australia. It was built from c. 1886 to 1960s. It is also known as Callianiotis Constructions and should not be confused with another building occupied by Rees R & Sydney Jones at 186 Quay Street. It was added to the Queensland Heritage Register on 21 October 1992.

== History ==
The one-storeyed brick building at 178 Quay Street was built for solicitor Rees Rutland Jones in about 1886. The building contributes to the 19th century commercial streetscape of Quay Street and represents a phase of commercial development and growth in Rockhampton during the late 19th century precipitated by trade at the port and the success of the Mount Morgan gold mines during the 1880s.

The legal firm Rees R and Sydney Jones was established in 1864 by Rees Rutland Jones and is today the oldest existing legal practice in Queensland. Rees Rutland Jones was to become one of the best known legal practitioners and prominent public identities in Central Queensland, eventually becoming a member of the Rockhampton Municipal Council, member for Rockhampton North in the Queensland Legislative Assembly, solicitor for the Mount Morgan Mining Company and the town solicitor from the years 1871 until 1896. Rees R Jones at the time of his death was the oldest practitioner on the Roll of the Supreme Court of Queensland.

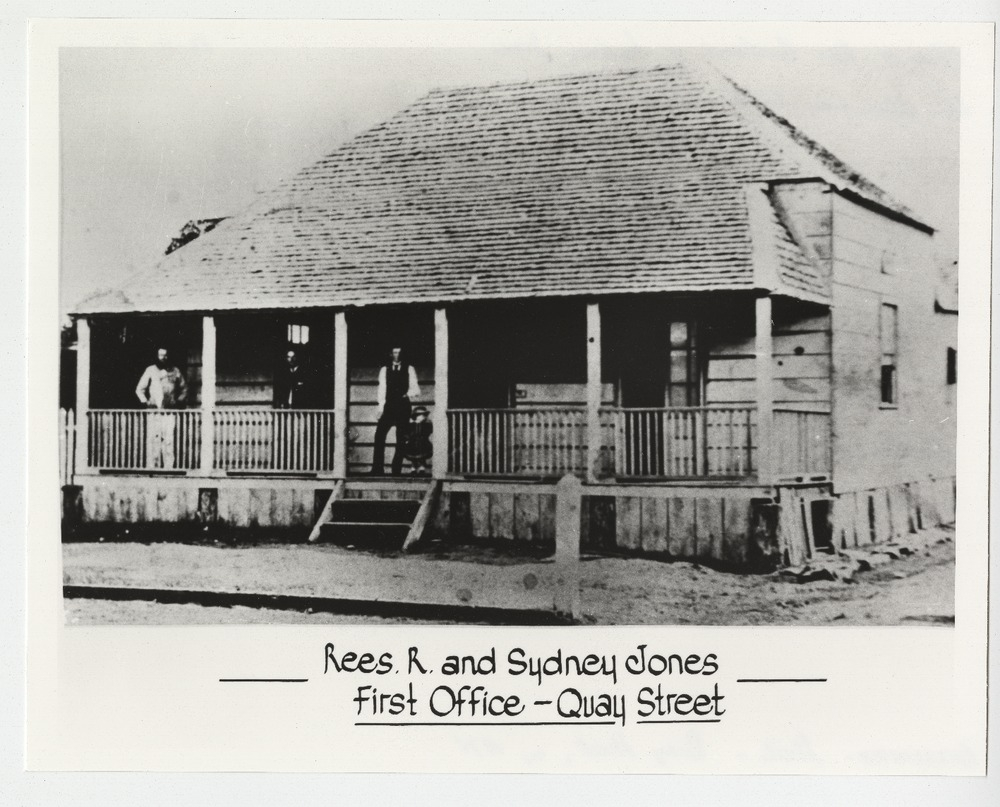
First office building of Rees R and Sydney Jones in Rockhampton, circa 1875

Rees Rutland Jones had occupied three different premises prior to the construction of the 1886 building. On 24 July, Rees R and Sydney Jones acquired the site in Quay Street which until this time had been vacant. The building was erected in the year which sealed the success of the Mount Morgan gold mines and its construction reflected the boom in development which occurred in Rockhampton during the 1880s. The building occupied one of the most advantageous positions in the city being situated close to the wharves and the other principal business premises along Quay Street. Rockhampton had been the major port in central Queensland since 1858, handling the pastoral and mineral products from the western settlements and it was the position of the wharves across from Quay Street which fostered the distinctive commercial development in the area.

Rees R and Sydney Jones extended their former premises in 1966–7 to cope with expanded staff numbers, but in 1975 decided to relocate their business to the former Queensland National Bank premises on the corner of Quay and Denham Streets.

In 1976 Central Queensland Salt Industries purchased this building and in June 1990 it was sold to Callianiotis Constructions.

In December 2015, the building was available for lease.

== Description ==
The Rees R and Sydney Jones Building abuts Quay Street and occupies almost the entire site allotment that adjoins the C J Edwards Chambers on the western side and Cattle House on the east.

The single storeyed brick building is elongated in form and consists basically of the original hip roofed section of the building at the front with a long gable roofed extension at the rear. The symmetrical facade of the building is cement rendered and strongly modelled with quoin work at each corner and around the front entrance. The original window and door frames have been replaced with modern aluminium style fixtures. Both windows have moulded architraves. A deep cornice together with dentils runs the full width of the building. The roof of the building is hidden from the street by a simple parapet. Internally the original section of the building consists of a central tiled corridor that provides access to three small carpeted offices on both sides. Most of the existing partition walls are original, as is much of the timber architraving. The acoustic ceiling throughout this section is suspended and is positioned approximately 600 millimetres (24 in) below the original. The original rear brick wall is currently painted and former window openings have been sealed. The original brick lined vaulted safe still survives.

A large single storeyed addition is attached to the rear of the original building. The structure is built of brick with a steel frame and has a concrete slab floor.

== Heritage listing ==
The former Rees R and Sydney Jones Building was listed on the Queensland Heritage Register on 21 October 1992 having satisfied the following criteria.

The place is important in demonstrating the evolution or pattern of Queensland's history.

The former Rees R and Sydney Jones building, erected in 1886 forms part of the historic Quay Street precinct which is distinguished by its late 19th century commercial buildings. The Quay Street precinct stands as a legacy to the Port of Rockhampton which served central Queensland from 1858. The port was influential in establishing Rockhampton as the premier commercial city of central Queensland and the river wharves fostered the substantial commercial development along Quay Street, enabling it to become the principal business district of the city. The solidity of the buildings were a symbol of Rockhampton's wealth, particularly generated by the Mount Morgan gold rush of the 1880s, and reflected the confidence with which the community and developers viewed Rockhampton's future.

The place is important because of its aesthetic significance.

The building possesses important aesthetic value because it contributes to the continuity and character of the late nineteenth century quayside.

The place has a strong or special association with a particular community or cultural group for social, cultural or spiritual reasons.

It also has special association for the people of Rockhampton through its significant aesthetic and historic contribution to Quay Street, which for many is the symbol of Rockhampton and is very closely associated with the image of the city.

The place has a special association with the life or work of a particular person, group or organisation of importance in Queensland's history.

The prominent Rockhampton legal firm, Rees R and Sydney Jones, has a long association with this building as its first owners and occupants for a period of 90 years.
