= Railway Administration Building, Rockhampton =

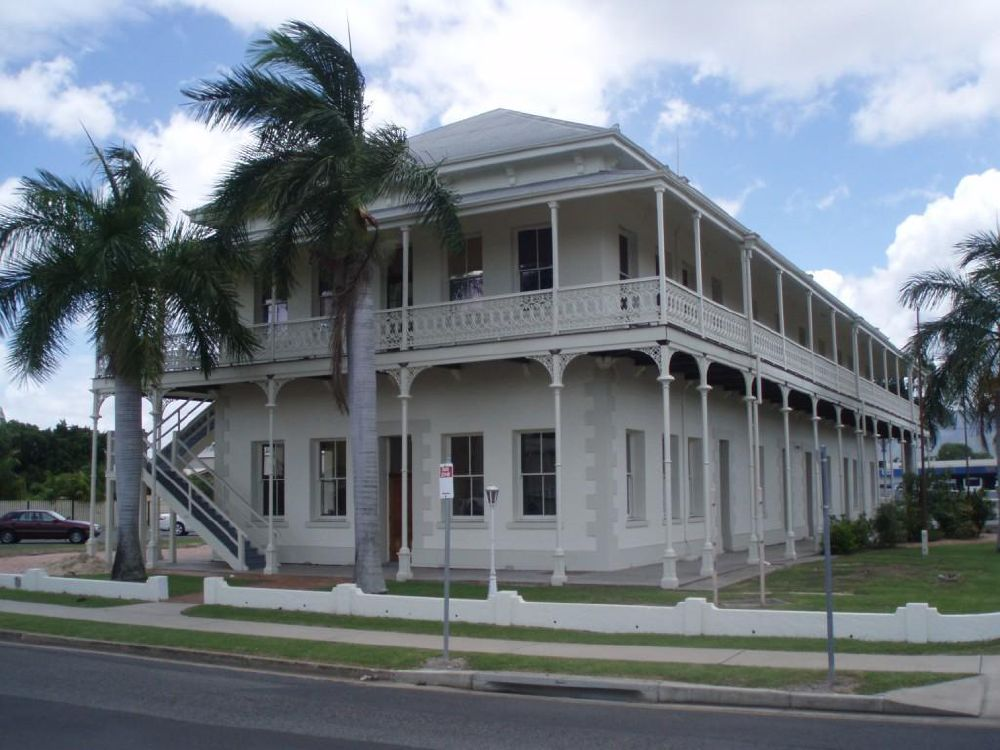
- Railway Administration Building, 2009

- Location within Queensland Location within Australia
- 23.385°S 150.5141°E
- Location: 233 Denison Street, Rockhampton, Rockhampton Region, Queensland, Australia

History
- Design period: 1870s–1890s (late 19th century)
- Built: 1886

Site notes
- Architectural style: Victorian Filigree

Queensland Heritage Register
- Official name: Rockhampton Administration Building (former)
- Type: state heritage (built)
- Designated: 12 July 2005
- Reference no.: 602367
- Significant period: 1886–1982 (historical)
- Significant components: furniture/fittings, views to, views from, office/administration building

The Railway Administration Building is a heritage-listed former office building at 233 Denison Street, Rockhampton, Queensland, Australia. It was built in 1886. It was added to the Queensland Heritage Register on 12 July 2005.

== History ==
The building was constructed in 1886 to a design prepared in the Office of the Chief Engineer for Railways. Its construction reflects the importance of Rockhampton as the coastal terminus of the Central Western railway line and the important role of the Central Western and North Coast railway lines in opening the Rockhampton hinterland and central western Queensland to settlement and economic exploitation, especially pastoralism and mining, during the last three decades of the 19th century.

The Port Curtis Pastoral District was proclaimed in 1854 following pastoral exploration of the Fitzroy, Dawson and Mackenzie River systems and the Broadsound and Peak Downs areas in the early 1850s. A small settlement was established at Rockhampton in 1856 to service the pastoral properties being taken up in the district, but until the nearby Canoona gold rush of 1858, comprised little more than a few buildings and a small wharf. In 1858 the township of Rockhampton was surveyed, gazetted and proclaimed a port of entry.

A key impetus to the separation of Queensland from New South Wales in 1859 was the complaint that the Sydney-based New South Wales government spent little on transport and communications infrastructure in the northern districts. One of the first agenda items for the Queensland Government was the establishment of a railway system. In 1863 plans were approved for construction of the Southern railway line, a narrow gauge system to link the pastoral properties of the Darling Downs with coastal and international shipping. Although less populated and having a much smaller economic base than the Darling Downs, Port Curtis and Leichhardt district pastoralists argued that a rail link to the coast was essential to develop the area. Their political influence in the Queensland Parliament resulted in a deal being struck: their support for the southern line in exchange for a second Central Western rail line to be constructed linking the Rockhampton hinterland to the coast. The discovery of rich copper deposits at Peak Downs west of Rockhampton strengthened the central Queensland case.

The Rockhampton railway was approved in October 1864. Work commenced in 1865 and the Central Western line (then known as the Great Northern Railway) opened to Westwood in September 1867. A two-storeyed, prefabricated iron station and goods shed were imported from England and erected at the coastal terminus in Stanley Street, Rockhampton. Wayside stations were established at Gracemere, Stanwell and Westwood. These were of Queensland design and construction.

The line was too short to be profitable and approval for an extension was granted in late 1872, opening to the Dawson River in 1874, Duaringa in 1876, Blackwater (where coal had been discovered) in 1877 and Emerald in 1879. After Bogantungan (1881), the most difficult section was encountered – the ascent of the Drummond Range. Longreach, the western terminus of the Central Western Railway, was reached in 1892.

These railway extensions increased rail traffic in Rockhampton, and by the mid-1880s additional administrative offices were needed. In 1884 FWC Kerr, a casual draftsman in the Central and Northern Division of the Chief Engineer for Railways' Office, worked on the plans for a new, substantial brick administration building for Rockhampton. This was constructed in 1886 at the corner of Denison and Stanley streets, diagonally opposite the 1867 station. It was unusual for Queensland Railways to construct a stand-alone brick office building; most of the larger railway office buildings were combined with passenger stations (such as at Roma Street and Central stations in Brisbane and the Townsville railway station) and in other centres tended to be smaller and of timber construction. Offices for a pay clerk were added in 1926.

Until 1982 the building functioned as headquarters for the Central Western Railway and later Central Division, except for a brief period in the late 1890s when Central Division was combined with Southern Division for economic reasons.

The original prefabricated station in Stanley Street was demolished in 1973 and replaced by a new station building. On 10 November 1982 a new railway administration building was opened adjacent to the 1970s station.

The 1886 railways administration building was refurbished as a Driver Training Centre in 1985. Alterations at this time included the installation of fire escape stairs and, internally, suspended ceilings, fluorescent lighting, a new staircase, new joinery and a new office fitout. The building was vacated again in 1994 then occupied briefly by Queensland Rail in 2000 before being sold.

As of 2010, the building was being used as the Denison Boutique Hotel.

== Description ==
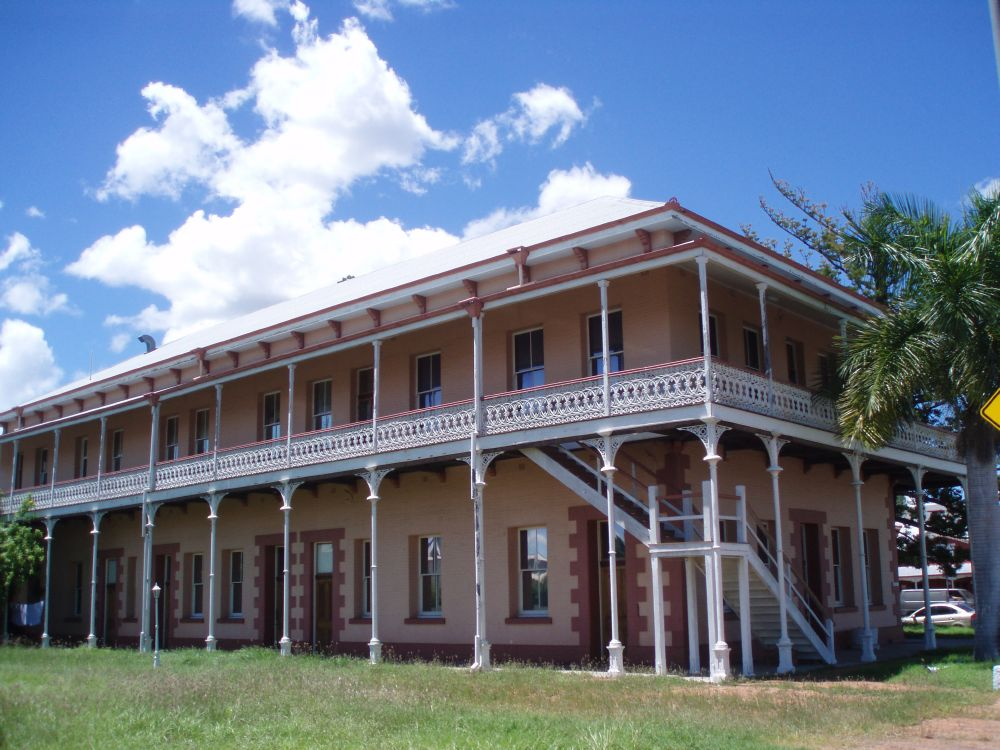
Railway Administration Building, 2008

The former Railway Administration Building is located near the Rockhampton city centre on the corner of Stanley and Denison streets, diagonally opposite the main railyards. It retains a physical relationship with the North Coast Railway along the middle of Denison Street, which passes the former railway office building before crossing the intersection of Dension and Stanley streets to enter the railyard.

The building is a two-storeyed, painted brick structure with a hipped roof and open verandahs to both levels on all sides. It has ornamental cast iron lace balustrades to the upper verandahs and cast iron columns to both levels. Original external timber joinery survives. The ground floor external walls have rendered quoins painted in a contrasting colour. The rear corners have timber fire escape stairs contained within the perimeter of the verandahs.

There is a low concrete fence along both street frontages. The grounds include mature hoop pines and palm trees.

The internal alterations made in 1985 are not considered to be of cultural heritage significance.

== Heritage listing ==
The building was listed on the Queensland Heritage Register on 12 July 2005, having satisfied the following criteria.

The place is important in demonstrating the evolution or pattern of Queensland's history.

The former Railway Administration Building, Rockhampton, is important in demonstrating the pattern of Queensland's history, illustrating the importance of Rockhampton as a major railway administration centre and the significance of the Central and North Coast railways to the central Queensland economy in the late 19th and early 20th centuries.

The place demonstrates rare, uncommon or endangered aspects of Queensland's cultural heritage.

It demonstrates an uncommon aspect of Queensland's cultural heritage, being the most substantial purpose-built railway administration building extant in Queensland; other substantial administration centres (including Central and Roma Street in Brisbane and Townsville Station) combine with railway passenger stations.

The place is important in demonstrating the principal characteristics of a particular class of cultural places.

The place is important in illustrating the characteristics of its class of cultural places: a substantial, late 19th century government office building designed for a sub-tropical climate. It is significant for the quality of its architecture and is a good example of the design work of the Office of the Chief Engineer for Railways in the late 19th century.

The place is important because of its aesthetic significance.

The building makes an aesthetic contribution to the streetscape and is a Rockhampton landmark.
