= Shandon, Rockhampton =

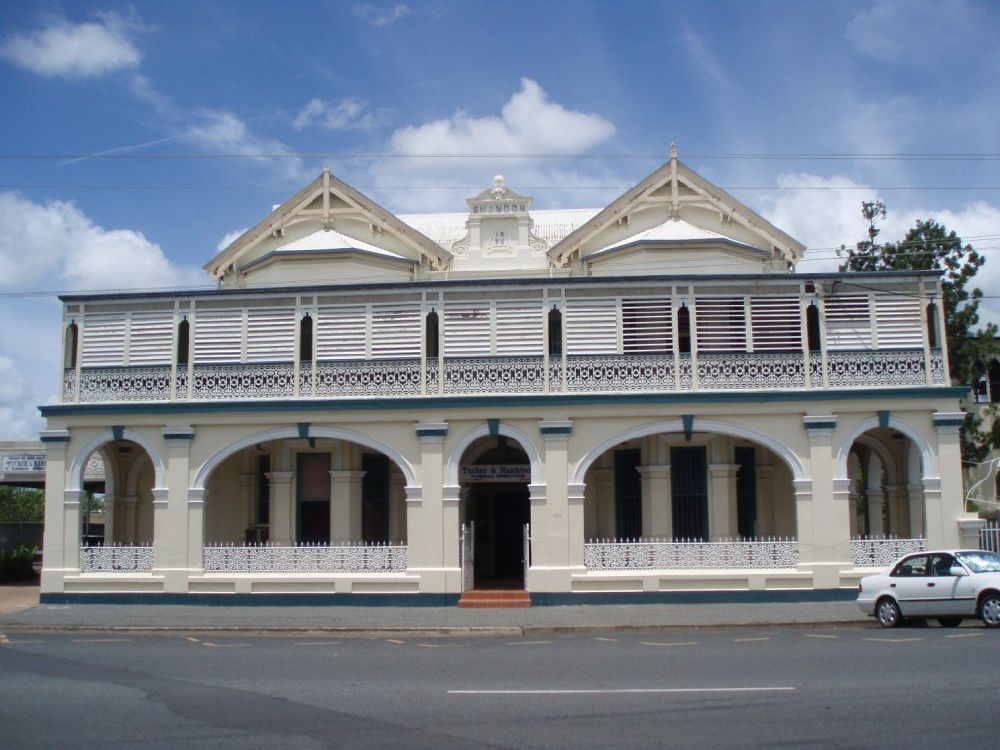
- Shandon, 2009

- Location within Queensland Location within Australia
- 23.3824°S 150.5128°E
- Location: 166 Alma Street, Rockhampton City, Rockhampton, Rockhampton Region, Queensland, Australia

History
- Design period: 1870s–1890s (late 19th century)
- Built: c. 1892

Site notes
- Architectural style: Classicism

Queensland Heritage Register
- Official name: Shandon
- Type: state heritage (built)
- Designated: 28 July 2000
- Reference no.: 601492
- Significant period: 1890s (fabric, historical)
- Significant components: residential accommodation – main house, verandahs – arcaded
- Builders: Walter Adam Lawson

Shandon is a heritage-listed house at 166 Alma Street, Rockhampton City, Rockhampton, Rockhampton Region, Queensland, Australia. It was built c. 1892 by Walter Adam Lawson who also built Rockhampton School of Arts and Avonleigh. It was added to the Queensland Heritage Register on 28 July 2000.

== History ==
One of Rockhampton's grander residences, "Shandon", was erected on Alma Street in 1892 by local builder and contractor Walter Adam Lawson, for resident surgeon and medical practitioner, Dr Henry Edward Brown.

"Shandon" is an extant example of Classic-style architecture adapted to Rockhampton's climatic needs by providing deep shading and a ventilating corridor to the interior of the premises.

Queensland Post Office records provide the first mention of Dr Henry Brown residing and working in Rockhampton as part of the community's "Medical Profession" in the period 1885–86, though no place of address is evident until 1888. From 1888 through to 1893, Dr Brown who is variously listed as medical practitioner and surgeon, resided at Campbell Street, Rockhampton. Records show that Dr Brown was then able to take up residence in his new purpose-built town house, "Shandon", on Alma Street by 1894–1895.

During the period 1892 through to 1897–1899, Dr Brown was engaged as the Visiting Surgeon to the 32-bed Children's Hospital in Rockhampton. Dr Brown also appears briefly on the Medical Staff of the 114-bed Port Curtis and Leichhardt Hospital (on Canning Street) approximately 1892–1893.

The well-known local builder and contractor of "Shandon" was Walter Adam Lawson. One history of Rockhampton acknowledges Lawson's local talents and contribution to the City's various buildings:

The fine handcrafted doors and window sashes in many older Rockhampton homes were possibly made in Lawson's Joinery Works. ... Its founder, Walter Adam Lawson, was born in Scotland in 1847 and there he learned his trade as carpenter and joiner. On arrival in Rockhampton in 1875 he obtained work with John Ferguson who was then the town's leading contractor, but several years later he and a partner trading as Holyoake & Lawson started joinery works in William Street. Lawson bought his partner's share in 1884, and about 1896 moved into his own newly erected premises in Bolsover Street. Major buildings constructed by Lawson during his pre-1900 contracting days include Saint Andrew's Church, the School of Arts, and private homes for Doctor F.H.V. Voss and Doctor H.E. Brown (Shandon).

Lawson's building contracting business (as was another builder and contractor P. Egan) was situated at William Street, Rockhampton. Lawson remained at this site until c. 1892, after which he moved to new premises at Bolsover Street by 1893.

Dr Brown's residential vision, combined with Lawson's contracting talents, resulted in a place of considerable "architectural merit and interest", which warranted the classification of "Shandon" by the National Trust of Queensland in 1978.

== Description ==
"Shandon" is a two storey rendered masonry residence addressing Alma Street, Rockhampton.

The main facade, facing north-west, is symmetrical with a two-storied verandah, twin gables and, below the gables, bay windows to both levels.

The verandah, which returns at each end, has at the lower level an arched arcade of rendered masonry with pilasters and cast iron balustrading. The upper level of the verandah has double timber posts, cast iron balustrades and timber louvred panels above. Between the levels is a moulded string course.

"Shandon" is located in a precinct which includes St Paul's Anglican Cathedral, St Paul's Cathedral Hall, and other church buildings.

== Heritage listing ==
Shandon was listed on the Queensland Heritage Register on 28 July 2000 having satisfied the following criteria.

The place is important in demonstrating the evolution or pattern of Queensland's history.

"Shandon" is important in exhibiting particular aesthetic characteristics valued by both the Rockhampton and broader community. This place is an important component in the local streetscape of Alma and William Streets, Rockhampton, and complements (on the same block) the heritage listed St Paul's Anglican Cathedral, and the associated Anglican church precinct that includes St Paul's Cathedral Hall and Offices.

"Shandon" is also important in demonstrating the principal characteristics of a particular class of cultural place, in this case a prominent and substantial town residence erected for Rockhampton Surgeon, Dr Henry E. Brown in 1892.

The place is important in demonstrating the principal characteristics of a particular class of cultural places.

Shandon is also important in demonstrating the principal characteristics of a particular class of cultural place, in this case a prominent and substantial town residence erected for Rockhampton Surgeon, Dr Henry E. Brown in 1892.

The place is important because of its aesthetic significance.

Shandon is important in exhibiting particular aesthetic characteristics valued by both the Rockhampton and broader community. This place is an important component in the local streetscape of Alma and William Streets, Rockhampton, and compliments (on the same block) the heritage listedSt Paul's Anglican Cathedral, and the associated Anglican church precinct that includes St Paul's Cathedral Hall and Offices.
