= Australian Estates Building =

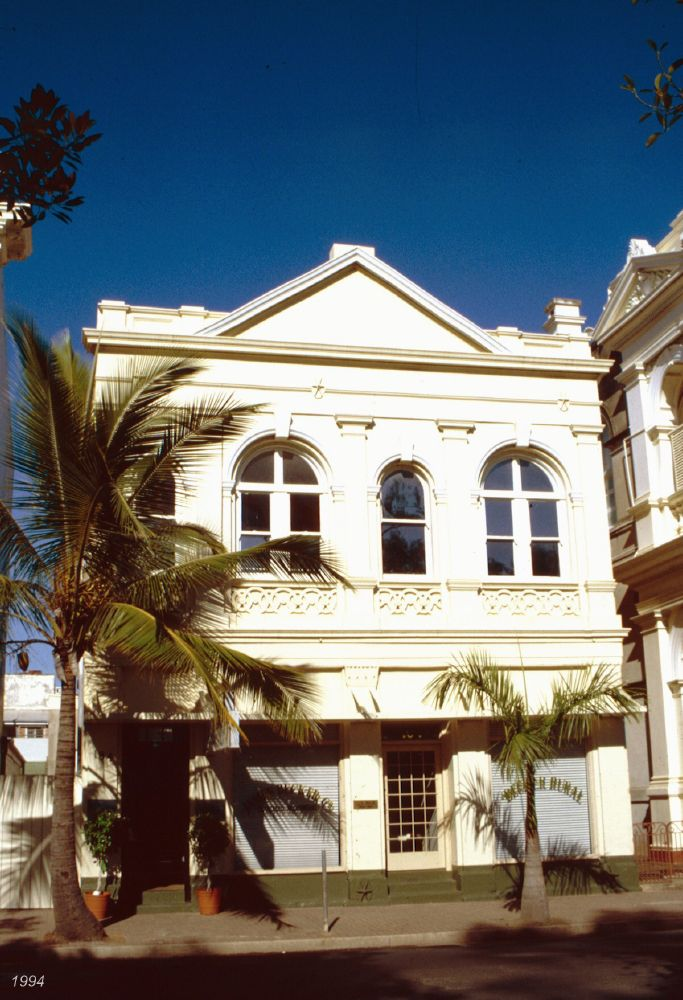
- View from the North-East, 1994

- Location within Queensland Location within Australia
- 23.3775°S 150.514°E
- Location: 182 Quay Street, Rockhampton, Rockhampton Region, Queensland, Australia

History
- Design period: 1840s–1860s (mid-19th century)
- Built: 1861–1884

Queensland Heritage Register
- Official name: Luck House, Australian Estates Co, Mansfield's Building
- Type: state heritage (built)
- Designated: 21 October 1992
- Reference no.: 600806
- Significant period: 1860s, 1880s (fabric); 1861–ongoing (historical commercial use)
- Significant components: out building/s

Australian Estates Building is a heritage-listed commercial building at 182 Quay Street, Rockhampton, Rockhampton Region, Queensland, Australia. It was built from 1861 to 1884. It is also known as Mansfield's Building and Luck House. It was added to the Queensland Heritage Register on 21 October 1992.

== History ==
The former Australian Estates building at 184 Quay Street, Rockhampton was originally constructed in 1861 as premises for the store and office of Percival Douglas Mansfield. The present facade was added in 1884 when the building was altered. The additions were designed by the prominent Rockhampton architect John William Wilson. The building is one of the oldest surviving in Quay Street and it contributes to the 19th century commercial streetscape which bears testament to the once thriving wharves of the Fitzroy River precinct.

The building was originally used as an office and store for the general merchant Percival D Mansfield who was the first postmaster of Rockhampton and the second mayor in 1862. During the early 1860s Mansfield advertised as "General Storekeeper and Commission Agent" in Quay Street but by 1867 he leased the building to numerous professionals who included three architects, a solicitor, a conveyancer and a surveyor. These tenants were listed in the Post Office Directories of 1868 in which the building was referred to as Mansfield's Building. When PD Mansfield died in May 1869 the property was left to his daughter, Elizabeth Cuthell, but was not transferred until 1891. In the 1870s Walter Reid & Co had its office on the ground floor of Mansfield's Building and in 1874 solicitors WK D'Arcy and Rees Rutland Jones occupied the upper floor.

The 1884 additions were designed by JW Wilson who called for tenders from bricklayers and contractors in May of that year for the erection of additions, alterations and repairs to the Mansfield Building. Wilson dominated the architectural scene in Rockhampton from 1864 until the 1890s. His work contributed significantly to the consistency of the Rockhampton townscape with six of the Quay Street buildings erected before 1901 being Wilson's design. Wilson designed over 200 buildings in the Central Queensland region during his 35-year practice and was one of the most prominent and prolific architects to have worked in Rockhampton.

The Australian Estates building represents two important stages in the development of Rockhampton as a prosperous commercial centre. The Canoona gold rush of 1858 helped establish Rockhampton as the major port in the region which later handled the mineral and pastoral products that came increasingly from the western settlements. Quay Street was one of the earliest parts of Rockhampton to be settled and it developed in a commercial capacity to serve the passing trade at the wharves which once stood across the road from the buildings. Quay Street developed rapidly from 1858 to 1882, with the construction in 1867 of the Central Western railway westward from Rockhampton increasing the flow of goods passing through the port. Very few buildings survive from this pre-1882 period and the former Australian Estates building is an example of early commercial development in Quay Street and Rockhampton.

The 1884 alterations reflect a boom time for the Quay Street precinct initiated by the Mount Morgan gold rush beginning in 1882. Rockhampton was well established by this time and the port attracted profits from the export of gold. The wealth from Mount Morgan allowed Rockhampton, and Quay Street in particular, to undergo considerable rebuilding, a trend reflected by the construction of the facade of the former Australian Estates building in 1884. In 1903 the Brisbane to Gladstone railway was opened and from this time the diminishing importance of the port caused the wharves to fall into disrepair and the development of the area to become more closely tied to the city centre.

The property remained in the Cuthell family until December 1941 when the Australian Estates & Mortgage Company purchased the building which they had leased since 1908. In 1980 the building was bought by Frank Luck Investments.

== Description ==
The former Australian Estates building is a two storeyed brick building set in alignment with the street boundary. The building currently displays the street number 184. Its cement rendered facade is painted, and is asymmetrically arranged allowing for separate access to both levels of the building from the street frontage. The upper windows of the facade are timber-framed double-hung sashes fitted into round-arched openings supported on pilasters, enframed by larger pilasters. The apron of each upper window is decorated with a relief, intersecting spherical design. The ground level shop fronts are aluminium framed single-paned glass windows, which are enframed by pilasters that have stylised leaf design capitals. Both entrance doors are multi-paned timber framed doors, which are not original. The gabled roof of the building is hidden from the street by a pediment that is capped with a simple cornice moulding. A large louvred ventilator exists in the rear gable end. Tie rods have been introduced into the facade and suggest previous structural instability. An awning has been unsympathetically attached across the width of the facade. The south-eastern elevation of the building is also cement rendered but is unpainted and features only an ashlar ruled finish. The other two elevations are face brickwork that has been over painted. The windows on these elevations are part of the original 1860s building fabric, being timber framed, double-hung windows with six panes per sash. Several of the upper-level windows have had window mounted air conditioned fitted to them.

The ground floor internally has had most original dividing walls removed and various forms of portable glazed partitioning installed to create a new floor layout. Due to the introduction of air conditioning, false ceilings have been fitted throughout the floor effectively obscuring the original ceilings. The upper level is accessed via a set of narrow internal stairs located in the southern side of the building. The stairs lead to an L-shaped corridor that, together with the stairwell, has a plasterboard ceiling and simple cornice. There are six rooms at the upper level of which several have the original timber lined ceiling. The floors throughout are either exposed timber boards or covered in vinyl. Original architraves and skirtings survive.

Attached to the rear of the building are two small and relatively recent flat roofed additions that house toilet facilities. The larger, which is two storeyed, is constructed of brick and the other, which is smaller and only single storeyed, is constructed of concrete block. A timber staircase provides access to the upper level of the building from the rear.

Also located on the building allotment is a completely separate structure that is cement rendered and has small awning style windows. This building is a much later of construction to the main building.

== Heritage listing ==
The former Australian Estates building was listed on the Queensland Heritage Register on 21 October 1992 having satisfied the following criteria.

The place is important in demonstrating the evolution or pattern of Queensland's history.

The former Australian Estates building, erected in about 1861 and altered in 1884, forms part of the historic Quay Street precinct which is distinguished by its late 19th century commercial buildings. The Quay Street precinct stands as a legacy to the Port of Rockhampton which served the vast area of central Queensland from 1858. The port was influential in establishing Rockhampton as the premier commercial city of central Queensland. The river wharves fostered the substantial commercial development along Quay Street, enabling it to become the principal business district of the city. The solidity of the buildings were a symbol of Rockhampton's wealth, later boosted by the Mount Morgan gold rush of the 1880s, and reflected the confidence with which the community and developers viewed Rockhampton's future. This building is one of the earliest surviving structures in Quay Street, dating from about 1861, and is an example of the early commercial development near the wharves.

The place is important because of its aesthetic significance.

The Australian Estates building possesses important aesthetic value because it contributes to the streetscape, continuity and character the late nineteenth century quayside.

The place has a strong or special association with a particular community or cultural group for social, cultural or spiritual reasons.

The Australian Estates building has special association for the people of Rockhampton through its significant aesthetic and historic contribution to Quay Street, which for many is the symbol of Rockhampton and is very closely associated with the image of the city.
