= Training Depot Drill Hall Complex, Rockhampton =

Former drill hall in Australia

Training Depot Drill Hall Complex
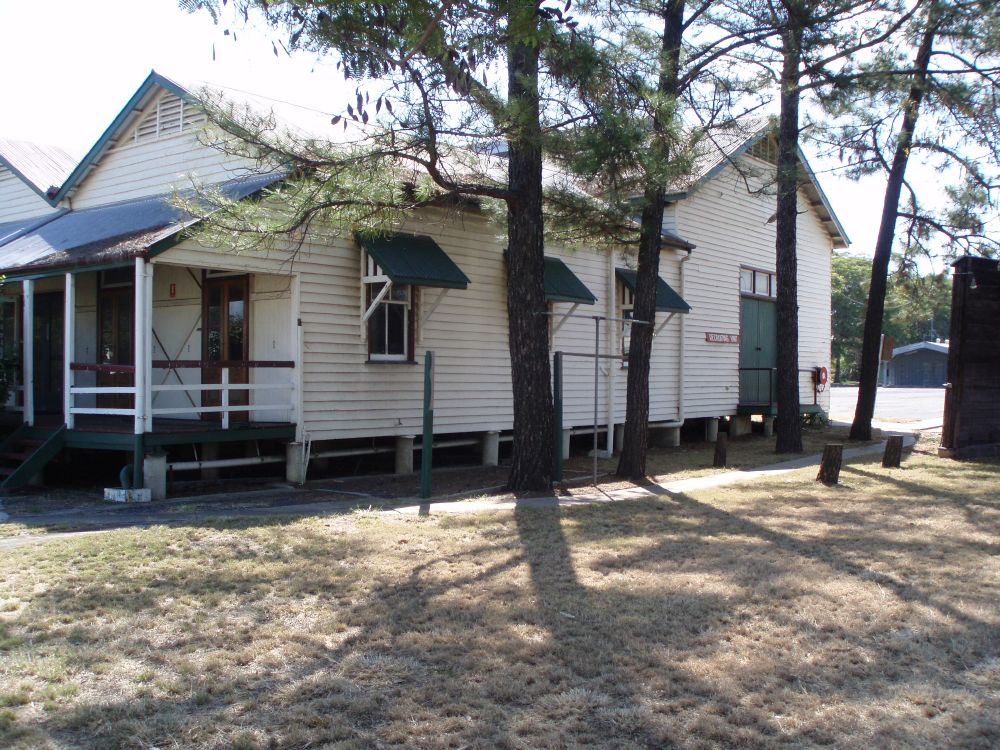
- Former Training Depot Drill Hall

- Location within Queensland Location within Australia
- 23.3755°S 150.5077°E
- Location: Archer Street, Rockhampton City, Rockhampton, Rockhampton Region, Queensland, Australia

Queensland Heritage Register
- Official name: Training Depot Drill Hall Complex (former)
- Type: state heritage (built)
- Designated: 5 June 2007
- Reference no.: 602258
- Significant period: 1900s (fabric); 1906–1939 (historical use)

Training Depot Drill Hall Complex is a heritage-listed former drill hall at Archer Street, Rockhampton City, Rockhampton, Rockhampton Region, Queensland, Australia. The complex was added to the Queensland Heritage Register on 5 June 2007.

== History ==
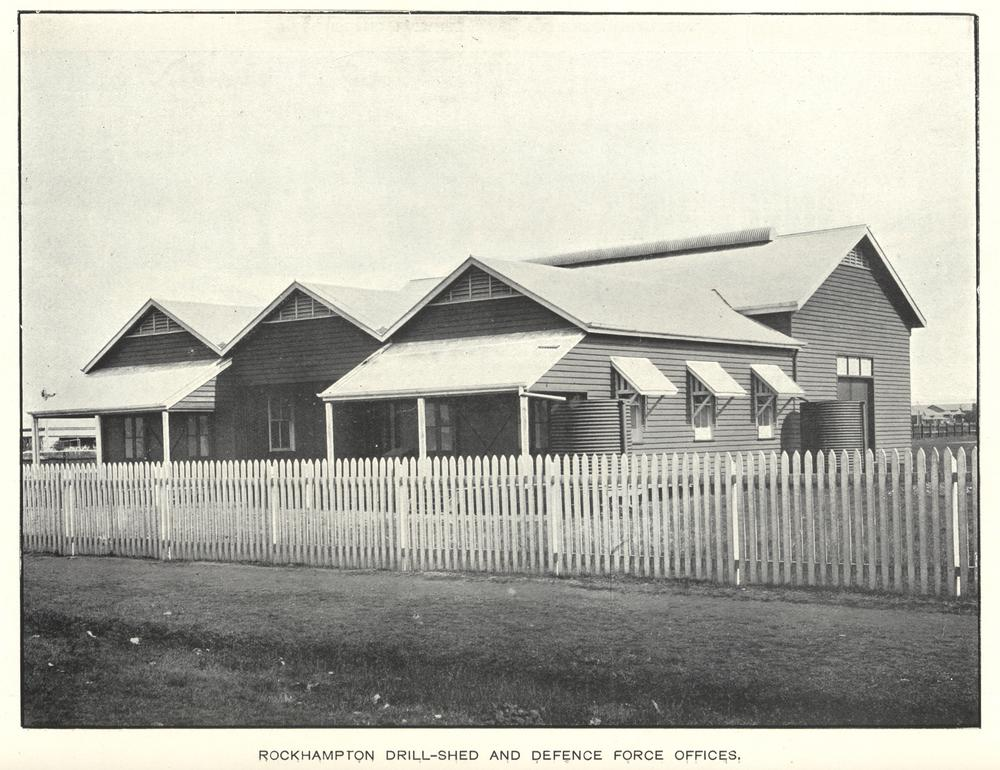
Rockhampton drill shed and defence force offices, circa 1913

The training depot drill hall was constructed in to specifications prepared by the Office of the Queensland Government Architect in May 1906 with additions to the southern side in 1937. Later additions to the site include the relocation of a drill hall and wagon shed from Mount Morgan in 1928 as well as the construction of a rifle range and brick Q Store by 1939. Further construction works were undertaken during and following the Second World War.

In the early 1850s the Archer brothers, William and Charles, were the first to exploit the pastoral prospects of the Rockhampton region following favourable reports from the explorers Ludwig Leichhardt and Thomas Mitchell a decade earlier. The New South Wales Government proclaimed the new pastoral districts of Port Curtis and Leichhardt in 1854 and Charles Archer reached Gracemere in 1855. Rockhampton was proclaimed a town in 1858 and an official town survey was carried out by Arthur Wood.

At the time of Queensland's separation, defence of the colonies was linked to Britain and British foreign policy. There was no guarantee that the Royal Navy would be able, or willing, to protect the Australian colonies in all eventualities. Each colony therefore developed their own defence forces.

The Queensland Government did not have the financial resources or population to establish a standing army; consequently, volunteer military forces have played a central role in the organisation of the defence of Queensland. Volunteer units were formed from 1860 onwards and regular training camps were organised as citizen soldiers became the foundation of the State's defence. These camps were held so that the various individual groups could train in larger numbers, a necessary requirement if they were to be an effective fighting force in the event of war.

A series of war scares in the late 1870s and an official survey of the colony's defences prepared by two military officers from England forced changes to Queensland's colonial defences. In 1884 the Defence Act was passed, completely reorganising the defence of the colony. The volunteer system was continued but augmented with the establishment of the first permanent local force in Queensland. The permanent force included paid militia and volunteer units, as well as members of the Police Force Rifle Clubs. After the passing of the 1884 defence act the government authorised the construction of a large number of drill halls around the colony. Many were built in the suburbs of Brisbane, and in the major towns such as Ipswich, Warwick, Gympie, Rockhampton, Mackay, Townsville and Cairns. Approximately thirty halls were constructed after 1884 and towards the turn of the century.

The training depot was situated on the northern portion of what was Section 25, the whole of which was originally designated a "square" (recreation reserve). The block bounded by Alma, Archer, Cambridge and Denison Streets was known as Leichhardt Square. In 1881, Leichhardt Square was proclaimed a Reserve for Public Purposes temporarily under the control of the municipality. In 1884, municipal control was declared permanent. Archer Park railway station was constructed on the southern half of the "square" in the late 1890s and opened in 1899.

The northern portion of Leichhardt Square (the training depot) was gazetted as a Defence Force Reserve (R139) in 1901. The reserve was one of many sites nationally that was transferred from the state to the commonwealth at Federation for defence purposes. This included buildings, fortifications, guns, ammunition and stores. In Rockhampton, a total of £4,526 of land, buildings and furniture was transferred. The "Drill Shed Reserve, Archer Park" was valued at £2,250 with no structures listed as being on the site at the time.

Before Federation the Queensland Defence Forces in Rockhampton are known to have utilised a site in Fitzroy Street. Prior to, or in addition to this, a shed near the court house was used. There is no official evidence of the use of the Leichhardt Square for defence purposes until 1901. The Fitzroy Street site was proclaimed a temporary drill shed reserve in 1886. At this time, it was considered that the defence movement in Rockhampton was likely to develop over the next few years and that, having four Corps with only one drill shed, the space was inadequate for the purpose without any spaced annexed to drill on. The "one storey, brick drill shed", as the Fitzroy Street structure was described, was constructed in 1878, although it is not known whether it was purpose built. In 1901, following the creation of the Archer Street site, the Fitzroy Street reserve was rescinded.

The Rockhampton Council appears to have been reluctant to lose the Archer Street site and attempted to negotiate conditions. The council consented to the transfer of the remaining portion of Leichhardt Square to military authorities subject to the government transferring to the council a portion of land adjoining the hospital to the Hospital Committee, and giving the council a certificate of title for the Fitzroy Street site. It would seem that the council did not acquire the Fitzroy Street site as it was subsequently used as a drill hall by Navy reservists as well as the 11th Field Ambulance.

Specifications for a drill hall and offices for the defence force, Rockhampton were prepared by the Department of Public Works, office of the Government Architect in May 1906. The specifications included the construction of the drill hall and offices, tank stands, earth closet as well as a split paling fence and double gates. By 1911 when repairs were undertaken to the site, an armoury, to the east of the drill hall had been constructed. The contract included general repairs to the woodwork, doors, windows and fanlights. Gravel was also laid down around the main entrance to the drill hall. Those structures to be painted included the drill hall, the armoury, the earth closet, two tanks, the front fence and four gates. The roof and walls of the armoury was also to be colour-washed.

At the time of its closure, the depot was occupied by the 42nd Battalion, the Royal Queensland Regiment. The Battalion claims an association with the site from its inception. The Battalion traces its history as a volunteer reserve unit to 1884 when a reorganisation of the Queensland Defence Force occurred, providing for the 5th Regiment, two companies of which were raised in Rockhampton. The 42nd Battalion, Queensland Regiment, has particular associations with Central Queensland, first through the Port Curtis Regiment and then in 1927 the Capricorn Regiment. The 42nd Battalion was originally raised in December 1915 and served with distinction in both world wars, but its military ancestors in Rockhampton go back to 1860 when Queensland Governor George Bowen on his first visit suggested that "a corps of volunteer riflemen" should be raised to provide internal and external defence for the township and also "to foster that spirit of independence and self-reliance, without which no people whose annals are recorded in history has ever attained a vigorous manhood". The Volunteers became an integral part of the city. From the Volunteers rose men of the calibre of Colonel DD Dawson who in 1918 was in command of the 42nd Battalion CMF (after service in Egypt and Gallipoli) and Brigadier-General William George Thompson, who became one of the city's most distinguished citizens.

Other united to have occupied the site include the 3rd Battalion Queensland Mounted Infantry, 15th Australian Light Horse, 9th Field Ambulance, 35 Field Engineer Squadron, 107 Transport Company, 4 Transport Company, the Royal Queensland Regiment, Regimental Cadets and the Air Training Corps.

The drill hall, along with the armoury and earth closets, remained the only buildings on site until April 1928. At this time three structures (a drill hall, wagon shed and earth closet) were removed from Mount Morgan and re-erected at the training depot. The drill hall and wagon shed, although modified, have remained on the property since that time. Plans to renovate the 1906 drill hall were carried out in 1937, when it was extended on the southern side. By 1943, the original armoury had been replaced with an ablutions and store block. A petrol/oil store was located to the west of the drill hall. This was later removed and a brick store was constructed in the north-west corner. The drill hall moved from Mt Morgan was being used for administration and also as a lecture hall, while the wagon shed moved from Mt Morgan was in use as a garage. By far the most construction taken place on the site was at the northern end. Buildings included another store, latrines, officers' mess and two buildings used as sleeping quarters, as well as an administration building, kitchen/officers' mess, other sleeping quarters and sergeants quarters.

By 1943 the brick Q store had also been constructed. According to the oral histories from those who were associated with the site, the Q store had been constructed at least by 1939. A section of this building was also utilised as a magazine, until it was decommissioned in the 1980s. During the Second World War, army medicals were held in the 1906 drill hall, which, by then, was also used as a recruiting depot. Similarly, in the 1950s, medicals for National Servicemen were held in the hall. The adjacent parade ground was the assembly point for servicemen on route to camp. Following the war, the drill hall was a popular venue for functions and dances and the 42nd Battalion used to cater for refreshments as a fundraiser.

By 1939, the rifle range has also been constructed. The range was used for firing 22 calibre bullets inside modified 303 and other rifles. This served the dual purpose of allowing reservists to have regular weapons handling practice and to provide experience prior to using larger calibre bullets at a regular, but less easily accessible, firing range. The range was used by school cadets from at least the Second World War. Besides defence units, the range was also used by civilian clubs, until the late 1980s.

At various times sections of the 1906 drill hall have been used as a Q Store, armoury, sergeant's mess and secure storage for vehicles loaded with goods. Immediately before its decommissioning, the drill hall fulfilled a number of purposes for the 42nd Battalion, as offices for Battalion headquarters staff, officer's mess and hall. Battalion memorabilia were displayed in cases and on the wall at one end of the hall area. From 1939 onwards, the 1906 hall was not used for formal military drilling. The hall area was not considered large enough for drilling purposes and the parade ground was used for such activities.

Further work to the site following the war included plans for residences for married quarters in February 1957 and again in February 1958. In order to construct the buildings, the earlier (c. 1943) officers' mess was demolished. By the 1990s, the buildings no longer met requirements for married quarters and were used for administration purposes.

In October 2000 the 42nd Battalion officially vacated the Archer Street Training Depot, moving to a larger site at Western Street, near the Rockhampton Airport. Presently, the former training depot remains vacant.

== Description ==
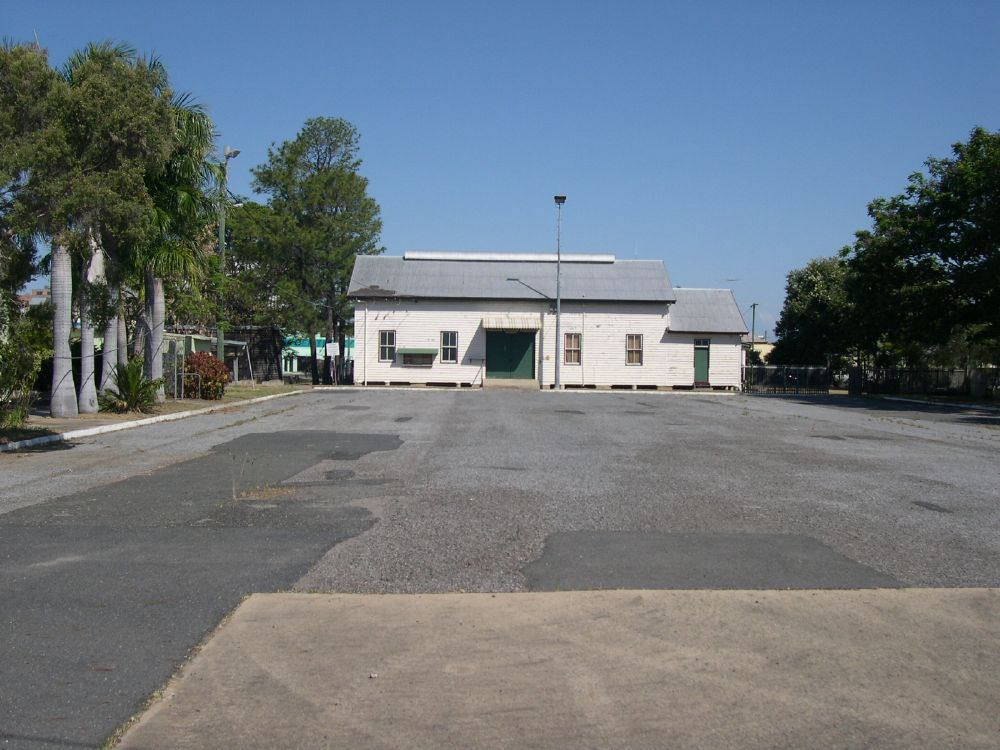
Drill hall, 2006

The former training depot drill hall has roughly a square floor plan. Viewed from the south or front elevation (Archer Street) it is divided into three equal gable roofed sections with a transverse gable over the drill hall behind. It is low-set building set on concrete stumps with a corrugated iron roof and is clad on three sides with weatherboard and has sash windows. The front is clad in an exposed frame and single skin tongue and groove "V" joint vertical boards. There is a full length skillion roofed veranda across the western side.

Internally, the front and western sides of the building are divided into partitioned offices and other rooms. Internal walls and ceilings are mostly tongue and groove vertically-joined boards with a number of walls being covered over with plywood and fibro sheeting. A fibreboard and batten ceiling in the drill hall section has also been added to what was originally an open roof cavity.

The floor in the hall is tongue and groove hardwood. The office and vestibule areas have been covered with linoleum, carpet and tiles.

The rifle range is approximately 25 metres (82 ft) long with a backing board at the northern end. The backing board is angular in shape and approximately eight metres across and four metres high. It is constructed of double skin horizontal timber slats packed with gravel and earth in between each one. A metal plate on which the target was placed is positioned in the centre of the range at the base. It is located adjacent to the drill hall.

The former drill hall, relocated from Mount Morgan, and later used for administration and as a sergeant's mess, is located on the eastern side of the site. The former drill hall is a low-set rectangular building with a corrugated iron and plywood exterior on concrete stumps. The original core of the building has a gabled corrugated iron roof. A skillion roofed extension has been added to the southern end. Internally, the former drill hall has a combination of original tongue and groove, vertically-joined, single skin boards and more recent fibro, plywood and particle board partitions. The floor of the original building is 75-millimetre (3.0 in) tongue-and-groove hardwood, with tiles and carpet in the extension at the southern end [the former sergeant's mess]. The original sash windows have been replaced with modern fittings. A veranda and outdoor pergola area extending back from the southern end of the building have been dismantled.

The former store is the former wagon shed removed from Mount Morgan at the same time as the former drill hall. The former wagon shed is a rectangular gabled roof shed with a corrugated iron exterior over a timber framework. There is no internal sheeting. Three sets of large hinged double doors across the western side provided access to the building. The building has no windows. The floor is a concrete slab with the exception of a small section of raised timber flooring at the northern end that has been partitioned off from the remainder.

The former Q Store, located in the north-east corner of the site, is a red brick, rectangular building with a hip corrugated iron roof with a small windowed loft/attic in the centre and a concrete floor. Internally, the building is divided into three equal brick walled sections each with large sliding double doors both sides of the building, giving access to Alma Street and the depot yard. Concrete ramps open to the yard side.

The only windows to the building are very high [at least two metres above the ground]. These are sash windows across both ends, protected by vertical steel bars. Two sections have exposed timber beams and rafters and the third section has had a fibro sheet ceiling installed. Other modifications to the place include some fibro sheet and vertically joined board partitioning and the addition of chip board flooring in the loft/attic to facilitate storage.

Other buildings on site include an administration building, originally constructed as a married quarters, located in the north-east corner of the site. The building is a low set rectangular building set on concrete stumps with a corrugated iron roof and hardiplank sheeted exterior. Internally, the rooms are partitioned with AC fibro sheet. The floor is timber. The adjacent carport/store has a Colorbond square boxed sheet exterior over a timber frame with a roller door and skillion roof.

A second former married quarters, later used as an administration building, is located in the north-east corner of the site. The building is high-set on concrete stumps with a weatherboard sheeted exterior and a corrugated iron hip roof. The interior is partitioned with masonite walls with timber flooring and original casement windows.

Other buildings on site include, more recently constructed stores, administration buildings and sheds. The area where the memorial was situated now comprises a square of raised earth. Constructed around eight years ago, the memorial stone has been moved to the new premises on Western Street. The parade ground, a bitumen quadrangle, measures approximately 60 by 30 metres (197 by 98 ft). The area served dual purposes as both a parade ground and parking enclosure.

== Heritage listing ==
The former Training Depot Drill Hall Complex was listed on the Queensland Heritage Register on 5 June 2007 having satisfied the following criteria.

The place is important in demonstrating the evolution or pattern of Queensland's history.

The former Training Depot Drill Hall complex is important in demonstrating the pattern of Queensland's history, particularly as the drill hall [1906] is a good, intact example of a post-Federation drill hall built prior to the increased construction of halls following amendments to the Defence Act in 1911. The drill hall is significant as a good example of its respective type and period and demonstrates the development of the site as a militia training depot. This scheme is visible in the fabric and layout of the drill hall and the parade ground.

The place demonstrates rare, uncommon or endangered aspects of Queensland's cultural heritage.

The 1906 drill hall is significant as a now rare example of one of the earliest extant, in-situ, drill halls in Queensland, and one of few remaining drill halls constructed prior to the First World War. Many of the extant drill halls in Queensland, for example those at Annerley, Albion, Kelvin Grove and Sandgate, were constructed post-1911, following the amendments to the Defence Act.

The place is important in demonstrating the principal characteristics of a particular class of cultural places.

With large spaces originally designed for internal drilling exercises and offices for companies assigned to the site, both the original drill hall and the relocated drill hall from Mt Morgan are significant as examples of the type of drill halls designed by the commonwealth government before and during the First World War. Particularly, the use of timber and corrugated iron was in response to a need for the buildings to be constructed efficiently and economically.

The associated buildings and structures on the site, particularly, the rifle range, the former married quarters, the 1914 wagon shed relocated from Mt Morgan, the various storage facilities, as well as the former brick Q Store, and kitchen and ablutions blocks provide further evidence of the use and evolution of the site, and the manner in which the participants spent time in the compound.

The place has a strong or special association with a particular community or cultural group for social, cultural or spiritual reasons.

Until recently, the Department of Defence had continuously utilised the site for at least a century. Whilst the numbers of servicemen and women who may have visited and trained at the site cannot be ascertained, their association with the depot is certain.
