= Archer Chambers =

Archer Chambers, Rockhampton
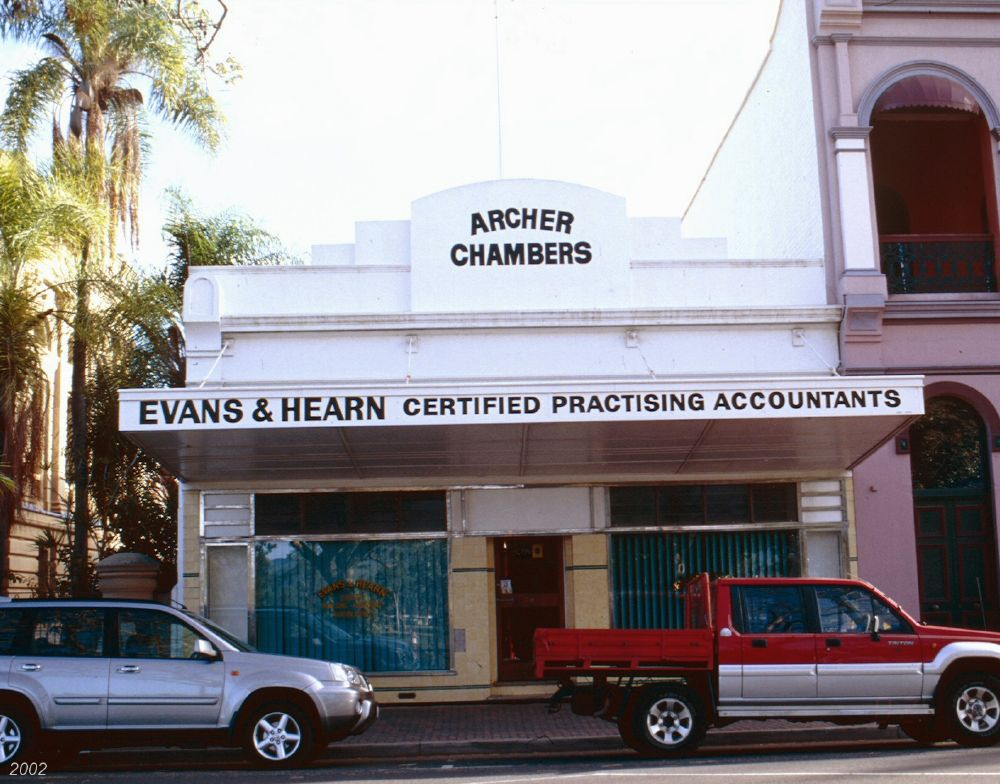
- Archer Chambers, 2002

- Location within Queensland Location within Australia
- 23.3781°S 150.5145°E
- Location: 206 Quay Street, Rockhampton, Rockhampton Region, Queensland, Australia

History
- Design period: 1870s–1890s (late 19th century)
- Built: 1870s

Queensland Heritage Register
- Official name: Evans & Hearn, Archer Chambers
- Type: state heritage (built)
- Designated: 21 October 1992
- Reference no.: 600809
- Significant period: 1870s (fabric); 1870s–ongoing (historical use as offices)
- Significant components: loading bay/dock

Archer Chambers is a heritage-listed former house and now office building at 206 Quay Street, Rockhampton, Rockhampton Region, Queensland, Australia. It was built in 1870s. It is also known as Evans & Hearn. It was added to the Queensland Heritage Register on 21 October 1992.

== History ==
The former Archer Chambers building at 206 Quay Street was erected in the 1870s for the pioneer Archer family. William Archer purchased the property at a sale of crown land in November 1858 as Allotment 2 of Section 46, in the Parish of Rockhampton and later constructed the building on subdivision 2 of the site as offices. The building forms part of the commercial streetscape of Quay Street which developed in the late 19th century to serve the passing trade at the wharves on the Fitzroy River.

The pastoralist-explorer brothers, William and Charles Archer, decided, on information given to them by Ludwig Leichhardt, to explore the country north of the Upper Burnett River. In 1853 they discovered and named the land and waters of the Fitzroy River. In 1855 the Archer brothers founded a station called Gracemere and chose the site of the future Rockhampton as their port. A settlement subsequently developed around the Fitzroy River, and the area was proclaimed a Port of Entry and a Pastoral District in October 1858.

The influx of gold seekers to Canoona in 1858 helped establish Rockhampton as the major Port in central Queensland which served a vast area supported by a network of roads which brought the exports of gold, copper, hides, tallow and wool from the hinterland in the 1860s. In 1867 the Central Western railway line was established westward from Rockhampton which further increased the flow of goods through the port. The port was influential in establishing Rockhampton as the major trade and communication centre of the region and until 1903, with the establishment of the North Coast railway line to Gladstone, it was the only link to the outside world.

Quay Street was one of the earliest parts of Rockhampton to be settled and it developed as the nucleus of the city during this period. The river wharves along Quay Street fostered the substantial commercial development from the 1860s to the early 1900s still evident in the precinct. The erection of Archer Chambers in the 1870s predates many of the fine buildings in Quay Street which were influenced by wealth brought to the city from the discovery of gold at Mount Morgan, south-west of Rockhampton, in 1882. It is an example of early development associated with the commercial influence of the port.

As a purpose-built property for the Archer family, the former Archer Chambers, reflects the significance of the family in Rockhampton. Since establishing the township and the port in the 1850s the Archer brothers continued to contribute to the growth of the Rockhampton. Charles and William were joined by their brothers Colin in 1855 and Archibald in 1860 who became the MLA for the Port Curtis District from 1867 to 1870. Several places in Rockhampton bear the Archer name including Archer Park and Archer Park railway station (now the Archer Park Rail Museum), Archer Street and the memorial to Charles Archer and his horse Sleipner.

Colin Archer was the last of the Archer brothers to die in Rockhampton in 1921 and in that year Archer Chambers was leased as offices. In 1947 the building was purchased by the New Zealand Loan and Mercantile Agency Company Ltd and in 1960 it was transferred to Mactaggarts Primary Producers Co-Op Association Ltd. The building is now occupied by accountants Evans & Hearn who purchased the building in 1975.

== Description ==
Archer Chambers abuts Quay Street and occupies almost all of the building allotment bounding the Rockhampton Customs House on the eastern side and adjoining the Royal Bank Building on the west.

The building is a single storeyed brick structure, longitudinally planned to create three distinct sections from front to rear. A single hipped roof, which is clad in galvanised steel decking, covers the entire building. The front section, which is mainly one large partitioned office space, is cement rendered externally. Internally the brick walls have been plaster rendered. The office partitions are timber framed with infill panels. Louvred glass panels fitted to an aluminium frame have been used for partition walls separating the two minor offices towards the southern end of the space. A suspended ceiling in the office area provides space for electrical and air conditioning conduits. The original battened ceiling still survives. The building's facade is symmetrical and consists of a central door with large aluminium framed shop windows at either side. Below the cantilevered awning that replaces the original awning, the facade has been tiled. The roof is hidden from the street by a parapet that supports a segmental pediment at the front. The building has only three other windows that are located on the east side of the building facing the Customs House. These are all single paned, double hung, timber framed windows, each fitted with steel protection bars.

The central section of the building, which is smaller than the front section, has exposed brickwork walls both internally and externally. Roofing trusses and timber framing for a loft floor level are entirely exposed. Simple timber brackets attached to the timber frames provide support for rudimentary shelving throughout the area.

The rear section, which is of similar size to the front section, is finished in much the same manner as the central section, with exposed framing, trusses and brick walls. The brick wall at the rear of the building is currently overpainted. An upper floor level created at the northern end of the space provides a split level work platform, originally used in conjunction with the simple timber and steel gantry. Rails for the gantry are fitted at both sides of the section, and run the full length of the space. A single large opening at the rear provides vehicular access to the building's interior. The original arched opening has been altered slightly to accommodate an early model roller door.

== Heritage listing ==
The former Archer Chambers was listed on the Queensland Heritage Register on 21 October 1992 having satisfied the following criteria.

The place is important in demonstrating the evolution or pattern of Queensland's history.

The former Archer Chambers building erected in the 1870s for William Archer, forms part of the historic Quay Street precinct which is distinguished by its late 19th century commercial buildings. The Quay Street precinct stands as a legacy to the rise of the Port of Rockhampton which served the vast area of central Queensland from 1858. The port was influential in establishing Rockhampton as the premier commercial city of central Queensland and the river wharves fostered the substantial commercial development along Quay Street, enabling it to become the principal business district of the city. The solidity of the buildings were a symbol of Rockhampton's wealth and reflected the confidence with which the community and developers viewed Rockhampton's future.

The place is important because of its aesthetic significance.

The building contributes aesthetically to the streetscape of Quay Street. There is a continuity of cornices and parapets between Archer Chambers and the former Royal Bank building next door (194 Quay Street) which emphasises the 19th century character of the street.

The place has a strong or special association with a particular community or cultural group for social, cultural or spiritual reasons.

Archer Chambers has special association for the people of Rockhampton through its aesthetic and historic contribution to Quay Street. This street is for many people the symbol of Rockhampton and is very closely associated with the image of the city.

The place has a special association with the life or work of a particular person, group or organisation of importance in Queensland's history.

Archer Chambers has special association with the Archer family, the first settlers of Rockhampton.
