= Queensland National Bank, Rockhampton =

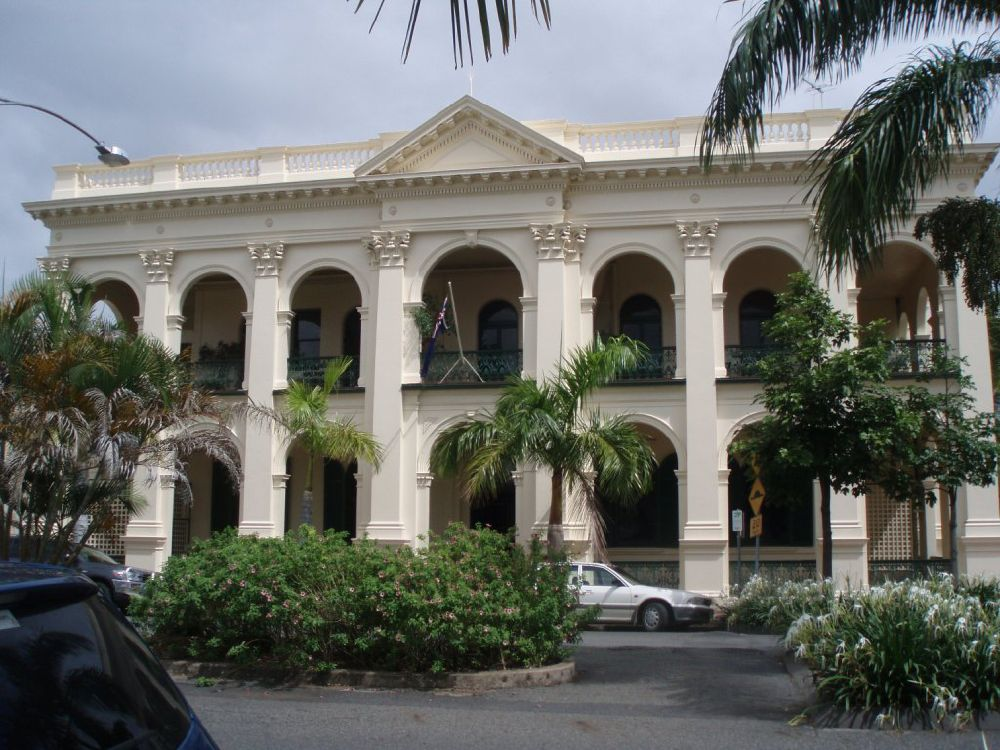
- Former Queensland National Bank, 2009

- Location within Queensland Location within Australia
- 23.3775°S 150.5141°E
- Location: 186 Quay Street, Rockhampton, Rockhampton Region, Queensland, Australia

History
- Design period: 1870s–1890s (late 19th century)
- Built: 1880

Site notes
- Architect: Francis Drummond Greville Stanley
- Architectural style: Classicism

Queensland Heritage Register
- Official name: R Rees and Sydney Jones, Queensland National Bank
- Type: state heritage (built)
- Designated: 21 October 1992
- Reference no.: 600807
- Significant period: 1880s (fabric); 1880–1975 (historical use)
- Significant components: banking chamber, fireplace, strong room, residential accommodation – manager's house/quarters, loggia/s
- Builders: Collins & Mclean

The Queensland National Bank Building is a heritage-listed former bank building at 186 Quay Street, Rockhampton, Rockhampton Region, Queensland, Australia. It was designed by Francis Drummond Greville Stanley and built in 1880 by Collins & Mclean. It is also known as R Rees and Sydney Jones Building (but not to be confused by another building occupied by that same firm at 178 Quay Street). It was added to the Queensland Heritage Register on 21 October 1992.

== History ==
The former Queensland National Bank is an imposing two-storeyed rendered brickwork building situated on the corner of Quay and Denham Streets in Rockhampton. It was erected in 1880 for the Queensland National Bank to the design of Queensland Colonial Architect FDG Stanley, however it was part of his private contractual work. It was constructed by Rockhampton builders Collins & Mclean for £8000.

The Queensland National Bank was the first and most successful of Queensland's three 19th-century banks. It was established in 1872 and by 1880, (the year of the construction of the Rockhampton branch) the bank held 40 per cent of the total deposits and advances in Queensland, a higher proportion than any other banking institution in any Australian Colony.

The Rockhampton branch was situated in Quay Street, a precinct of solid commercial buildings which developed to serve the passing trade at the wharves from the 1860s until the early 1900s. The former bank's expression of confidence reflected the prosperity the river wharves brought to Quay Street during this period of high commercial activity. Although many of the fine buildings in the locality had their origins from Mount Morgan wealth, this bank predated the discovery of gold at Mount Morgan in 1882 by two years. The construction of a building of this calibre reflected the established success of Rockhampton as a major trade and transport centre of Queensland by the early 1880s.

Stanley's design for the building consisted of a banking chamber on its first floor, with a second storey providing a living residence for the bank manager. This combined function was performed by the building for nearly a century. At the time of its construction the Morning Bulletin referred to it as a "handsome structure". It was described by a visiting correspondent from the Brisbane Courier in 1893, as being "a stately colonnaded building".

The Queensland National Bank was to become a regular client of Stanley. Stanley's most impressive bank building was the headquarters of the Queensland National Bank in Brisbane which he designed in 1880 and was completed in 1885. Other Queensland National Banks designed by Stanley included, St. George 1878–1879, Maryborough 1881, Warwick 1881–2, Toowoomba 1885 and Bundaberg 1887.

In 1886, Rockhampton architect John W Wilson called for tenders for painting the exterior of the building. Further work to the bank building was carried out under Wilson's supervision in May 1887 including painting and repairs to the building.

The Queensland National Bank on the corner of Quay and Denham Streets was vacated in 1975. The banking company moved from the premises to new offices situated in East Street. In April 1975, the former bank building was purchased by the legal firm Rees R & Sydney Jones who had occupied a building three doors away since 1886.

Rees Rutland Jones founded the legal firm in 1864 establishing what is today the oldest legal firm in Queensland operating under its original name. Rees R Jones was one of the best known legal practitioners and prominent public identities in central Queensland, eventually becoming a member of the Rockhampton Municipal Council, member for Rockhampton North in the Queensland Legislative Assembly, solicitor for the Mount Morgan Gold Mining Company and the town solicitor from the years 1871 until 1896. Rees R Jones at the time of his death was the oldest practitioner on the Roll of the Supreme Court.

Repairs to the former bank building as well as modifications to the internal arrangements of the banking chamber were carried out after the change of ownership in 1975. The original entrance to the building leading from Denham Street was altered, creating a new main entrance off Quay Street. This helped to maintain continuity for the legal firm whose former offices fronted Quay Street.

In 1987 further upgrading of the work environment and the introduction of new work practices saw the refurbishment of the premises in 1988. The ground floor of the building (former banking chamber) was redesigned to accommodate professional members of the firm as well as the support and administrative staff. With the increase in staff numbers and the introduction of new workplace technologies, it was decided that a mezzanine floor should be built between the ground and first floor.

The first floor of the building (the former living quarters and residence of the bank manager) was converted into an area containing the Law Library, Board Room, interview rooms, kitchen and staff rooms. The exterior of the building was repainted, and the interior re-carpeted.

Externally the glass and aluminium sections that enclosed the Quay Street second storey verandah were removed opening up the verandah. Extensive areas of the original timber ground floor supporting structures were replaced. The entrance from Quay Street was also closed off and the main entry from Denham Street was reinstated, complying with the original design for the building. The refurbishment was finished in 1989. Additional work was also undertaken in 1993–1994.

== Description ==
The former National Bank building is prominently located on the corner of Quay and Denham Streets, Rockhampton. The two storeyed rendered brick building has classically composed and detailed facades addressing both streets, with the principal entrance to the former banking chamber off Denham Street, and the entrance to the stair hall and former first floor residence off Quay Street. A shallow pitched hipped corrugated iron roof is concealed behind an Italianate balustrade surmounting the principal facades.

The principal facades of the former National Bank comprise two storeyed arcaded loggias. The arched openings are separated with double storeyed smooth finished pilasters with moulded bases and Corinthian capitals. These visually support an entablature comprising base string mouldings, a frieze with moulded rondels aligned with the pilasters and, above this, a dentilled cornice. Projecting slightly from the seven bay Denham Street facade is a central entrance portico with detailing consistent with the loggia with a triangular pediment bordered with the dentilled cornice moulding surmounting the entablature. The arched openings on the facades of the former National Bank have semi circular heads, with moulded architraves and imposts flanking the pilasters separating the openings. More decorative moulding around the arches emphasises the central projecting bay. The Quay Street facade extends for five bays, the middle bay of which has been recently infilled for the installation of a lift.

The arched openings are linked by cast iron balustrading on the two storeys. The ground floor loggia has concrete floors and a ceiling clad with small gauge corrugated iron and braced with chamfered timber beams. The upper storey loggia, which features arched openings of shorter proportion than those on the ground floor, has a timber boarded floor and ceiling.

The principal opening off Denham Street, accessed through the loggia within the projecting portico is a substantial double timber panelled and moulded door, with semi circular fanlight above, leading into a small entrance vestibule from which double timber framed and glazed doors, also with semi circular fanlight above, give access to the former banking chamber. Surrounding the double timber doors on the external wall is a plaster moulded architrave with prominent keystone. Flanking the doorway are two groups of three round arched window openings fitted with vertical sash windows and fixed louvre timber shutters. The moulded sills of these openings, and of those on the Quay Street facade of the building are integrated into a continuous string moulding at this level. At the northern end of the Quay Street facade is another entrance, comprising a single six panelled door flanked by sidelights, with a semi circular fanlight above. The first floor level features French door openings that correspond to the openings on the ground floor and also have round arched heads.

Internally the building can still be appreciated as a former bank, with layout evident on both floors, although recent modifications have been made. From the principal entrance, access is provided to the former banking chamber that is a large room in the centre of the ground floor of the building. The room is interspersed with several masonry piers and pilasters with Corinthian capitals, recalling the external detailing and providing support for large ceiling beams and defining the area where banking desks may have been formerly aligned. As well there are several cast iron columns, also with Corinthian capitals. The ceiling in this space has been replaced with a modern plasterboard ceiling through which services, including air conditioning, lighting and fire services, have been inserted. A modern steel framed mezzanine level has been added to the banking chamber. In a corner is a heavy masonry banking safe with a large iron door (John Tann, Patentee, London) and, internally, a vaulted concrete ceiling. Around the perimeter of the banking chamber access is provided via good quality moulded and panelled cedar doors to many offices that line the external walls of the ground floor.

The principal stair is located in the hall off the principal opening to the building on Quay Street. This dog leg stair has a large carved timber newel, cast iron balustrade and is cantilevered from the adjacent walls. The first floor level, which is smaller in plan than the ground floor, houses five major rooms arranged in an L-shaped plan along the two principal facades of the building. Access is provided to these rooms from an L-shaped hallway beginning at the stair hall and continuing around the rear of the building.

Generally the interior of the building has plaster clad walls with timber skirtings, concrete floors on the lower floor and timber floors on the first floor and plaster ceilings with deep plaster cornices. The joinery throughout the building is of very good quality cedar. Several chimney pieces survive intact including, on the ground floor, an ebonised timber with marbled infill panels, and on the first floor a green marble piece with red marble inserts as well as a white marble piece. These chimney pieces are complete with cast iron fireplaces.

== Heritage listing ==
The former Queensland National Bank was listed on the Queensland Heritage Register on 21 October 1992 having satisfied the following criteria.

The place is important in demonstrating the evolution or pattern of Queensland's history.

The former Queensland National Bank building erected in 1880, forms part of the historic Quay Street precinct which is distinguished by its late 19th-century commercial buildings. The Quay Street precinct stands as a legacy to the rise of the Port of Rockhampton which served the vast area of central Queensland from 1858. The port was influential in establishing Rockhampton as the premier commercial city of central Queensland and the river wharves fostered the substantial commercial development along Quay Street, enabling it to become the principal business district of the city. The solidity of the buildings were a symbol of Rockhampton's wealth and reflected the confidence with which the community and developers viewed Rockhampton's future.

The place is important in demonstrating the principal characteristics of a particular class of cultural places.

The former Queensland National Bank is an outstanding example of 19th-century colonial bank architecture. It demonstrates the principal characteristics of a substantial commercial building in the Classical Revival style, distinguished by the quality of its detailing and materials.

The place is important because of its aesthetic significance.

The former bank building contributes significantly to the 19th-century quayside of Quay Street being one the grandest and most prominently positioned buildings in the street.

The place has a strong or special association with a particular community or cultural group for social, cultural or spiritual reasons.

The former bank building has special association for the people of Rockhampton through its significant aesthetic and historic contribution to Quay Street, which for many is the symbol of Rockhampton and is very closely associated with the image of the city.

The place has a special association with the life or work of a particular person, group or organisation of importance in Queensland's history.

Designed by FDG Stanley, the building bears testament to the prominence of Stanley's work in Queensland.
