= Cattle House =

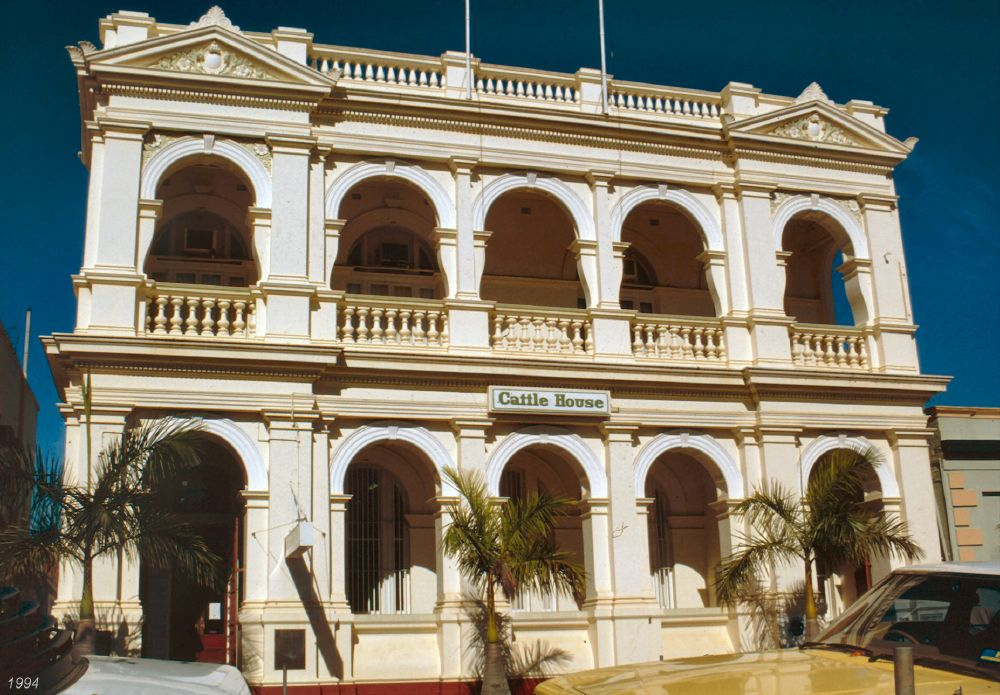
- Cattle House, from the north-east, 1994

- Location within Queensland Location within Australia
- 23.3773°S 150.5139°E
- Location: 180 Quay Street, Rockhampton, Rockhampton Region, Queensland, Australia

History
- Design period: 1900–1914 (early 20th century)
- Built: 1903–1904

Site notes
- Architect: Addison & Corrie
- Architectural style: Classicism

Queensland Heritage Register
- Official name: Cattle House, Union Bank of Australia
- Type: state heritage (built)
- Designated: 21 October 1992
- Reference no.: 600805
- Significant period: 1900s (fabric); 1904–1980 (historical use as bank)
- Significant components: loggia/s, fireplace, gate – entrance, strong room, banking chamber, residential accommodation – manager's house/quarters

Cattle House is a heritage-listed former bank building at 180 Quay Street, Rockhampton, Rockhampton Region, Queensland, Australia. It was designed by Addison & Corrie and built from 1903 to 1904. It is also known as Union Bank of Australia and the Cattleman's Union building. It was added to the Queensland Heritage Register on 21 October 1992.

== History ==
The Cattleman's Union building at 180 Quay Street, Rockhampton was erected in 1903 as a two-storeyed concrete-rendered brick building for the Union Bank of Australia. It was designed by Brisbane architects Addison and Corrie and was the second premises to be constructed on the site for the Union Bank of Australia. The original bank premises was erected in 1864 making it one of the earliest examples of commercial development in Quay Street. The Cattleman's Union Building contributes significantly to the streetscape of Quay Street which is characterised by commercial buildings of high quality from the 1860s to the 1900s.

A branch of the Union Bank of Australia had operated in Rockhampton in rented premises from 28 October 1862. By the end of 1863, a two-storeyed brick building with verandahs was nearing completion on the site of the present building. The contract price for the building was £3,291/5/- and the final cost, including office fixtures and furnishings, was £3,612/14/-. The building consisted of a banking chamber, strongroom, manager's room, clerk's room and dining room on the ground floor and a drawing room and four bedrooms on the first floor. The complex, on half an acre of land, also included a temporary brick kitchen, servant's rooms, outhouses and wooden stables. The Union Bank had been cautious to keep the cost of the 1864 building close to £3000 as re-sale was a possibility because of some uncertainty, in these early years, of Rockhampton's future as a commercial city.

The bank occupied one of the most advantageous positions in the city being situated on Quay Street close to the wharves and the other principal business premises. During the 1860s, Rockhampton was the major port in central Queensland which handled the pastoral and mineral products that came increasingly from the hinterland. It was in these early years that Quay Street developed in a commercial capacity to serve the passing trade at the wharves.

Development in Rockhampton and in Quay Street escalated greatly during the 1880s due to the immense wealth generated by the discovery of gold at Mount Morgan. The new economic buoyancy of the 1880s created a period of rebuilding throughout the city, a trend reflected by development in Quay Street. Nearly all the major buildings in Quay Street were constructed between 1882 and 1903. The establishment in 1903 of the North Coast railway line to Brisbane caused the importance of the port to diminish and further commercial development in Rockhampton to be more closely tied to the city centre. The construction of the new Union Bank premises in 1903 was a part of the tail end of the 19th century development boom in Quay Street.

The present building was erected after the Union Bank's General Manager sought approval from the board in 1902 to rebuild on the site of the run-down 1864 bank building. Despite his concerns about the poor economic conditions in the area due to drought, the new building was occupied at the end of July 1904. Tenders for the new bank premises were called in September 1903 by Brisbane architects GHM Addison and Leslie Gillespie Corrie in conjunction with Rockhampton architects AM Hutton and EM Hockings. Addison and Corrie had practised as architects in Brisbane from 1898 to 1905 and designed such buildings as the Bank of New South Wales in Fortitude Valley and Queen Street, Brisbane (1899), and the former Chandler's building (Moon's building) in Adelaide Street, Brisbane (1900). GHM Addison had previously sustained a successful career in Brisbane from 1886, establishing himself as a prominent architect being responsible for the design and completion of the Exhibition Building in 1891.

In October 1951, the Union Bank of Australia and the Bank of Australasia merged to form the Australian and New Zealand Banking Corporation Ltd. The Quay Street Building remained the premises of the ANZ Bank until 6 November 1980, when the building was purchased by the Cattleman's Union who continue to own and occupy the former Union Bank building.

== Description ==
Cattle House, the former Union Bank of Rockhampton, is a substantial two storeyed load bearing masonry building on Quay Street, facing north-east overlooking the Fitzroy River. The building, like the nearby former National Bank, employs classical architectural features, most prominently a double storeyed arcaded loggia on the principal Quay Street facade.

The building is L-shaped with a double storeyed loggia to Quay Street, rear double storeyed verandah and two storeyed service wing from the northern end of the rear elevation. Abutting this section a single storeyed wing runs. The corrugated iron roof, which is concealed behind a parapet comprises a hip over the principal section parallel to Quay Street perpendicular to which a double hipped section covers the remaining part of the principal building. Another hipped section extends over the service wing.

The end bays of these five bay loggias project slightly from the face of the building and are surmounted by triangular pediments. The end bays emphasise the two principal entrances of the building, the one to the northern end providing access to the ground floor, former banking chamber, and on the southern end providing access to the stair hall leading to the first floor. At the ground floor level the arcaded loggia features round headed arched openings, full length in the end bays indicating openings and partially infilled with a heavy solid masonry balustrade on the three central bays. The arcade openings are separated with single storeyed pilasters whose base mouldings align with the balustrade mouldings. The intrados, or soffit of the archway is clad with coffered plasterwork.

The arcaded loggia on the upper floor has fine rounded arched bays, corresponding to those on the ground level but with shorter supports. The archways rest on rendered masonry imposts which taper gradually towards the arch supports giving the opening a complex curved shape. Italianate masonry balustrading is found in each of the five openings. Pilasters separate the openings and these rest on bases which, again, align with the top moulded course, frieze panel and dentilled cornice. All this is surmounted by a parapet of Italianate balusters divided into sections by squat piers which align with the pilasters on the ground and first floor levels. Ornate plasterwork of foliage arabesque with rosettes is found in the spandrels of the archways in the end bays of the first level. Above these, in the pediment of the end bays is a cartouche flanked by acanthus and floral plasterwork. Surmounting the apex of the pediment is a plasterwork palmette moulding which also adorn the pediment as acroteria.

Two entrances provide access to the building from the Quay Street facade. Separating the entrance from Quay Street within the arched opening are double wrought iron gates. The northern end, where access is provided to the ground floor, is fitted with a double multi panelled door of painted timber, flanked by side lights and all surmounted by a semi-circular fanlight. Half glazed French doors are fitted to the internal section of the door frame. The other entrance, at the southern end, and providing access to the stair hall is fitted with a double timber door of also of multi-panelled design, flanked by long thin window openings and surmounted by a semi-circular fanlight.

Generally the interior of the building is notable due to the high quality of early decorative elements, in particular excellent quality joinery and plasterwork. The interior was planned to provide banking chamber and offices on the ground floor and a residence on the first floor and this layout is still able to be appreciated, despite changes particularly at the rear of the ground floor.

Upon entering the ground floor, one encounters the former banking chamber, now a large reception foyer for the Cattleman's Union. This room has a particularly ornate pressed metal ceiling divided into three sections with heavy beams clad with pressed metal. Each section is decorated with moulded ribs dividing the surface of the ceiling into smaller planes decorated with panels of foliated moulding and ceiling roses.

On the eastern wall of this room access is provided three rooms, two offices including the former manager's office which has window openings to Quay Street, and the former strong room, which has a massive concrete shell, heavy iron door and a vaulted concrete ceiling. The western wall of the former banking chamber has several large cut away openings making the room seem to extend into the rear of the building.

The stair and entrance hall, access to which is provided through the entrance at the southern end of the Quay Street facade, is a long room extending the breadth of the building and divided by a round arched opening with moulded architrave and imposts and with a prominent keystone. The archway separates the principal stair from the entrance area. This is a dog-legged timber stair with turned balusters and turned newels at the landings and at the base and top. A vertical sash window opening is fitted with simple leadlights.

The upper floor of the former Union Bank is arranged with a central hallway running parallel to Quay Street from which the principal first floor rooms are accessed. The hallway has a timber boarded ceiling, plaster cornice and frieze rail, dado rails and timber skirting. The timber floor is covered with carpet. The former drawing room, now a meeting room, is a large room in the north-eastern corner of the building with two pairs of French doors opening onto the first floor loggia. This is the largest room on the floor and has a timber boarded ceiling with timber strip mouldings creating a geometric pattern over the timber boards and skirting boards. Two other rooms face Quay Street on the first floor of the former Union Bank, a small former dressing room and a former bedroom. The bedroom has a detailing similar to that of the drawing room but the other rooms on this floor have more simple timber boarded ceilings and less substantial detailing.

The interior of the former Union Bank features two quite grand chimney pieces, one in the former manager's office and the other in the former drawing room. The fire surround is constructed from highly ornate, carved timber forming two fitted shelving units flanking the fireplace and supporting, with five overscaled timber brackets over the fireplace, a substantial timber mantle. Several other chimney pieces in the building are derivative of these larger examples.

== Heritage listing ==
Cattle House was listed on the Queensland Heritage Register on 21 October 1992 having satisfied the following criteria.

The place is important in demonstrating the evolution or pattern of Queensland's history.

Erected in 1903 as premises for the Union Bank of Australia, Cattle House forms part of the historic Quay Street precinct in Rockhampton, an area distinguished by its late 19th-century commercial architecture. The precinct reflects the legacy of the Port of Rockhampton, which from 1858 served a vast region of central Queensland. The port played a key role in establishing Rockhampton as the principal commercial centre of the region, with the river wharves driving substantial development along Quay Street and shaping it into the city’s main business district. The solidity and scale of the buildings symbolized the city’s prosperity in the late 19th century, largely fueled by the success of the Mount Morgan gold mines discovered in 1882. Cattle House represents a later phase of development along Quay Street, constructed just before the decline in the importance of the river wharves shifted commercial activity toward the city centre and the expanding railway network from around 1903.

The place is important because of its aesthetic significance.

Cattle House possesses important aesthetic value contributing significantly to the streetscape of Quay Street which retains the character of a nineteenth century quayside. In conjunction with the neighbouring buildings, particularly the Rees R & Sydney Jones Building, it forms a dominant block which strongly defines the corner of Quay and Denham Streets.

The place has a strong or special association with a particular community or cultural group for social, cultural or spiritual reasons.

Cattle House has special association for the people of Rockhampton through its significant aesthetic and historic contribution to Quay Street. This street is for many people the symbol of Rockhampton and is very closely associated with the image of the city.
