= Walter Reid Community Arts Centre =

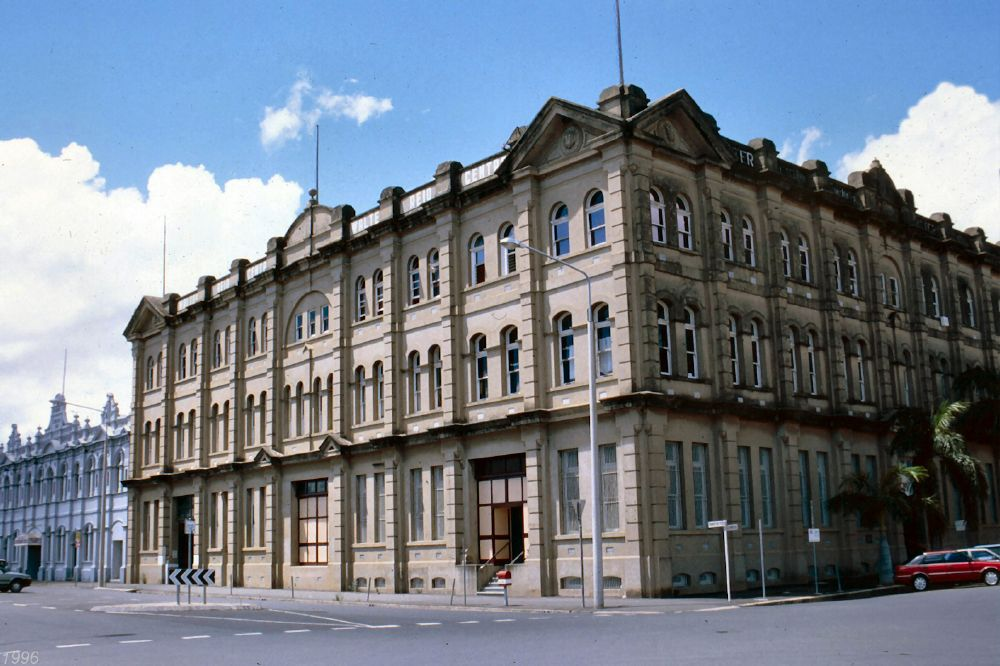
- Walter Reid Community Arts Centre, 1996

- Location within Queensland Location within Australia
- 23.3812°S 150.516°E
- Location: 203 East Street, Rockhampton, Rockhampton Region, Queensland, Australia

History
- Design period: 1900–1914 (early 20th century)
- Built: 1900–1902

Site notes
- Architect: Hutton & Hockings

Queensland Heritage Register
- Official name: Walter Reid Community Arts Centre, Walter Reid & Co
- Type: state heritage (built)
- Designated: 21 October 1992
- Reference no.: 600791
- Significant period: 1900s (fabric); 1902–1970s (historical use)
- Significant components: basement / sub-floor, loading bay/dock, carriage way/drive, flagpole/flagstaff
- Builders: Dennis Kelleher

Walter Reid Community Arts Centre is a heritage-listed former warehouse and community arts centre at 203 East Street, Rockhampton, Rockhampton Region, Queensland, Australia. The building was designed by Hutton & Hockings and built from 1900 to 1902 by Dennis Kelleher. Also known as Walter Reid & Co, it was added to the Queensland Heritage Register on 21 October 1992.

== History ==
The former Walter Reid & Co warehouse at the corner of East and Derby Streets was erected between 1900 and 1902 for the wholesalers Walter Reid & Co. The rendered brickwork building was designed by Rockhampton architects Hutton and Hockings and was built by Rockhampton builder Dennis Kelleher. It was the second warehouse to be constructed for the rapidly expanding merchandisers and was built when Rockhampton's activity as a thriving city port fostered such commercial development near the Fitzroy River wharves.

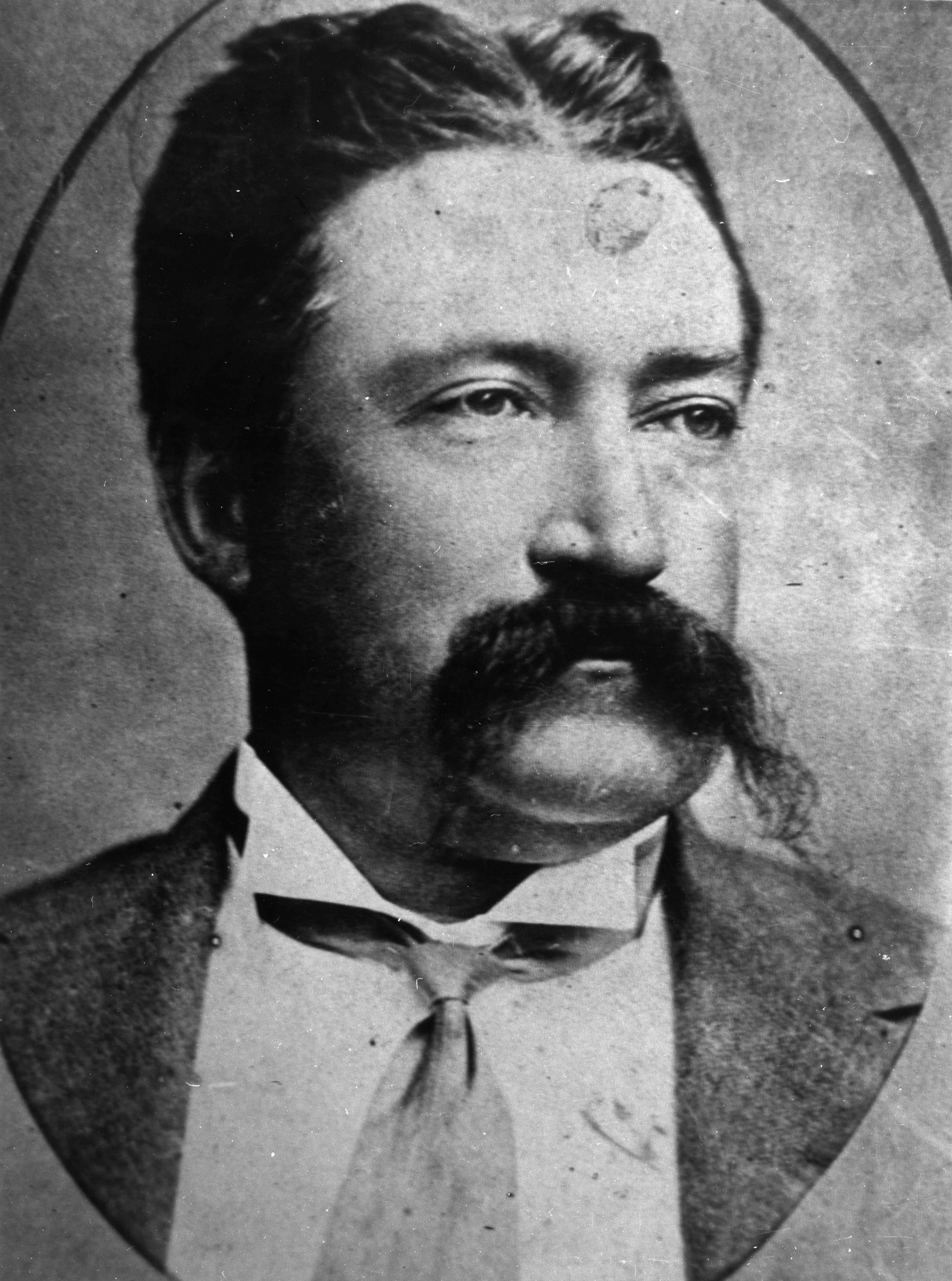
Walter Reid, merchant of Rockhampton

Walter Reid, the founder of Rockhampton's premier mercantile house Walter Reid & Co, came to Rockhampton in 1862 to manage a southern owned retail store on East Street, which he subsequently bought in 1864. He moved from his shop to new premises situated in Quay Street in 1868. It was in these new premises where Reid began to specialise as a wholesaler, trading in wine, spirits and general merchandise, supplying the hotels and stations in central Western Queensland. Since Rockhampton had been declared an official port in 1858, it had acted as the major transport and trade centre of central Queensland, making it a prosperous city in which wholesale merchants like Reid could base their business.

Walter Reid's business prospered in the expanding colonial economy. He diversified his interests, and ran lighters down the Fitzroy River to Keppel Bay where larger ships from overseas unloaded their cargoes. The firm acted as a local agent for British-based companies and it was through this business connection that the British company McIlwraith & McEachearn bought Reid out in 1881.

The new owners continued to operate the business under the name of Walter Reid & Co and during the 1880s the turnover was in the vicinity of £50 000 per annum. The firm acted as general merchants distributing groceries, ales, domestic and builders' hardware, farm produce, "fancy" goods, rural products, drugs, stationery, confectionery, and cigarettes. The business also acted as an importers and exporters, as well as a bondkeepers, storekeepers, produce dealers, shipowners, insurance, stock and station agents, financial agents and general commission agents. By 1890, the business had expanded so dramatically that new premises were needed. The firm moved to the corner of Quay and Derby Streets and took residence in its new warehouse, which was designed by Brisbane architect Richard Gailey.

The prosperity which Walter Reid & Co had enjoyed throughout the 1880s was reflective of the wealth in Rockhampton during this period. The immense profit generated by gold mining at Mount Morgan from 1882 created an economic boom in the city. The success of the firm during the 1880s helped it withstand the depression years of the 1890s and the following devastation which drought brought to Queensland in the early 1900s.

As the new century approached, the firm once again needed larger premises. Directors of the firm Rees R Jones and John Ferguson acquired land for the company on the corner of East and Derby Streets. The allotment was behind the 1890 warehouse, across Quay Lane and next to the Headrick & Co Warehouse in East Street.

The Walter Reid & Co Warehouse, built between 1900 and 1902, stands as evidence to the activities of the port of Rockhampton around the turn of the century. The building served the passing trade of imports and exports and was situated in an area surrounded by other warehouses and commercial buildings which had developed near the wharves during the prosperous later decades of the 19th century. The 1902 Walter Reid & Co warehouse was the largest mercantile store in Queensland at the time and as such was a symbol of the importance of the Rockhampton port.

The building was designed by Rockhampton architects Hutton & Hockings. Edwin Morton Hockings was a pupil of Richard Gailey in Brisbane in the 1880s, and while there he entered and won a competition for the design of Rockhampton Girls Grammar School. He joined with Alfred Mowbray Hutton in 1898 after some years of sole practice in Rockhampton. Hutton & Hockings had designed other buildings similar to the Walter Reid warehouse including the New Zealand Loan and Mercantile Agency (1894), and the Mount Morgan Gold Mining Company Building in Quay Street (1897–98).

Construction of the Warehouse commenced in 1900 but the drought in central Queensland gave builder Dennis Kelleher (who also built the Rockhampton Post Office in 1892) trouble in finding heavy timber required for the supporting posts. This delay inflated costs for the construction of the warehouse and by 1901 more than £7000 had been outlaid for the building. When completed in 1902 the warehouse included a cartway that ran through the building from East Street to Quay Lane and a system of winches and lifts for shifting goods to the upper floors of the warehouse.

Walter Reid & Company continued to expand, importing goods directly from England, America, Europe and India at the turn of the century. A new produce store was built on the corner of Stanley and East Streets, and later a brick wool store on the corner of Stanley and Quay Streets. In 1904 Walter Reid & Co took over one of the oldest established wine and spirit merchants in Brisbane, Brabant & Co as well as a subsidiary business in Mackay, WH Paxton & Co. A Sydney office was established in the 1910s and in the 1920s a large and expensive warehouse was built in the centre of Sydney.

During the Second World War both Walter Reid & Co warehouses on Quay and East Streets were used by American troops. The East Street warehouse was used as a United States Army Hotel, operated by the American Red Cross. After the war, Walter Reid & Co moved back into the warehouses and began to diversify its business interests, becoming involved in pastoral and cattle properties, hotel and retail establishments through subsidiary businesses. In the late 1950s, part of the East Street warehouse was used to manufacture tin and sheet metal until a new factory was built in North Rockhampton. The firm eventually went back towards retailing, buying department stores in Queensland's provincial towns and marketing them under the name of 'Reid's'.

Walter Reid & Co was well enough established to survive the winding down of operations at the port in the middle of the 20th century as its main activities were no longer focussed on the river wharves. However, by the 1970s the firm was experiencing losses in its grocery wholesaling department due to changes in shopping practices since the 1950s. The company decided to move out of grocery wholesaling and was relocated to North Rockhampton where it continued under the name of 'Reid's'.

Both of Walter Reid & Co's major warehouses in Rockhampton were sold in the 1970s. The warehouse at the corner of East and Derby Streets was bought by the Rockhampton City Council in 1977 and converted to a community arts centre. Before 1975 the building had undergone very little change. During the Second World War, when the building was used as a Red Cross Club, toilets and bathrooms were constructed on the second floor. During the late 1950s part of the building was used as a tinware factory and the second floor may have been overlaid with concrete to support the necessary machinery.

In the 1970s two fire isolated concrete stairwells were constructed along the East Street and Quay Lane elevations and a passenger lift was introduced, enclosed in a brick shaft. The exterior of the building is virtually intact and the original dividing walls survive across the building, dividing it into three distinct parts. The overall impact of the changes to the warehouse have been minor and except for the fire stairs the changes could be easily reversed.

== Description ==
The Walter Reid Community Arts Centre, a three-storeyed unpainted cement rendered masonry warehouse structure, is located on the northern corner of East and Derby Streets. The building is separated from Walter Reid Court, another former warehouse, by Quay Lane to the northeast.

The building has masonry cross walls, from East Street to Quay Lane, which divide the structure into three sections. The widest section, consisting of three bays, has a basement and is located at the southeast fronting Derby Street. A narrower three bay section is located centrally, and a two bay section which provides vehicle access through the building is located at the northwest. However, these three sections are not apparent from the exterior of the building, which is composed of regularly spaced bays separated by engaged piers.

The engaged piers have horizontal recesses, suggestive of coursing, and a deep cornice separates ground and first floors. The roof is concealed behind a parapet wall consisting of a deep cornice supporting rendered pillars which surmount the engaged piers. The sections between the pillars have the name "WALTER REID AND COMPANY LIMITED" in relief. Each corner bay is surmounted by an open bed triangular pediment with the company coat of arms in relief to the centre. The centre bay to both street frontages is surmounted by a rounded pediment with a central vertical moulding crowned by a rendered ornament. The parapet has three surviving flagpoles, two of which are located along the East Street elevation at the western end and in the centre, and the third is located at the eastern end of the Derby Street elevation.

The centre bay to Derby Street is narrower than the centre bay to East Street, however both are detailed in a similar manner, with gablets to the cornice framing the ground floor entrance, a vertical moulding separating the sash windows to the first floor, and an arch moulding framing low sash windows to the second floor. The ground floor is the tallest, and the second floor the shortest of the three floors.

The ground floor elevation has tall, paired sash windows with fanlights to each bay, and the Derby Street section has short segmental arched header lights to the basement. The East Street elevation entrances are located in the central bay, which consists of a loading bay with tall diagonally boarded timber sliding doors, and the second bay from the Derby Street corner, which has a stair accessing recessed doors framed by diagonally boarded timber panels. Vehicle access is located in the second bay from the northern end, and consists of a roller door surmounted by multi-paned glazing, and an introduced fire escape door is located adjacent at street level. The Derby Street entrances are located in the centre bay, which has a stair accessing recessed metal framed glazing, and an introduced fire escape door at the eastern end at street level.

The first floor has paired sash windows with segmental arched fanlights and expressed rendered mouldings to each bay, with the centre bay to East Street having two sets of paired sash windows. The second floor has shorter paired sash windows with arched fanlights to each bay.

The Quay Lane elevation is not rendered, but has a similar composition of regularly spaced engaged piers with paired sash windows to each bay. The ground floor has four loading bays, three of which have cast iron gutter covers which are embossed with the firm's name.

Internal framing is provided by substantial timber columns, bearers and joists, with ceilings lined with galvanised ripple iron to the ground and first floors. Steel box beams are also used in some areas to increase clear spans. Flooring consists of rough sawn timber boards, some areas of which have been sheeted over, and piers to the basement and sub-floor are masonry. The roof has timber framed trusses with bolted connections, forming a saw-tooth profile, with glass louvred clerestory windows. Ceilings are lined on the rake with beaded tongue and groove boarding, and the roof is sheeted with corrugated iron.

The ground floor is split-level, with the northern section slightly above street level for vehicle access. Three openings are provided in the central masonry cross wall to access the central section of the building, which has access to the Derby Street section of the building via a central opening in the adjoining cross wall. A central corridor connects the Derby Street entrance, and the space is partitioned to provide various sized compartments which function as a gallery space, administration offices, amenities, meeting rooms and studio spaces. Fire stairs are located fronting East Street and Quay Lane, and along the Derby Street frontage exiting at the eastern corner. A lift has been introduced on the northeast side of the building adjacent to the Quay Lane fire stairs. A timber stair is located centrally and accesses the basement, which has rendered masonry walls and piers, and a concrete floor. A second timber stair is located at the eastern corner.

The first floor is partitioned similarly, with a central corridor, large gallery and studio spaces, performance areas, and amenities at the eastern corner. A mezzanine has been introduced in the northern section.

The second floor has larger spaces, and the three sections of the building are more identifiable. The northern section houses two large gallery spaces, accessed via two arched openings in the cross wall, and the central section is predominantly open space with amenities at the northeast end. The Derby Street section houses a performance space at the northeast end, and a visiting artist's flat and studio at the southwest end.

== Heritage listing ==
Walter Reid Community Arts Centre was listed on the Queensland Heritage Register on 21 October 1992 having satisfied the following criteria.

The place is important in demonstrating the evolution or pattern of Queensland's history.

The former Walter Reid warehouse on the corner of East and Derby Streets, Rockhampton was erected between 1900 and 1902 and reflects the high level of commercial development which occurred near the wharves on the Fitzroy River during the latter 19th century. As the largest mercantile warehouse of its time in Queensland, the former Walter Reid warehouse stands as a legacy to the prominence of Rockhampton as a commercial city port during the late 19th and early 20th centuries. Together with the adjacent Walter Reid Court (Walter Reid Court) erected in 1890 the building is an integral member of a highly intact warehouse precinct reflective of the early trading centre near the wharves.

The place demonstrates rare, uncommon or endangered aspects of Queensland's cultural heritage.

The building's exterior finish, of unpainted cement render, is a comparatively rare surviving example of a once common form of exterior architectural treatment.

The place is important in demonstrating the principal characteristics of a particular class of cultural places.

The Walter Reid Community Arts Centre is a typical example of warehouse construction, utilising masonry load-bearing external walls with heavy timber columns and bearers supporting timber floors and a saw-tooth roof. The building also retains elements such as the basement, through carriage-way, large interior volumes and evidence of early machinery, all of which are typical of warehouse structures.

The place is important because of its aesthetic significance.

The Walter Reid Community Arts Centre, a three-storeyed former warehouse structure, has a considerable street presence due to its massive bulk, long street elevations and unpainted cement rendered facade. The building is recognised as a local landmark and makes a significant contribution to the Rockhampton streetscape and townscape. The building is of aesthetic merit, and the form, fabric and materials illustrate a skilled design approach.

The place has a strong or special association with a particular community or cultural group for social, cultural or spiritual reasons.

The building has special association for the people of Rockhampton as an historical landmark which contributes to the image of the city.

The place has a special association with the life or work of a particular person, group or organisation of importance in Queensland's history.

It also has special association with Walter Reid & Co, a longstanding Rockhampton based mercantile company which was important in Queensland economic history in the late 19th and early 20th centuries. The building stands as an important example of the work of Rockhampton architects Hutton & Hockings (1898–1904).
