= C J Edwards Chambers =

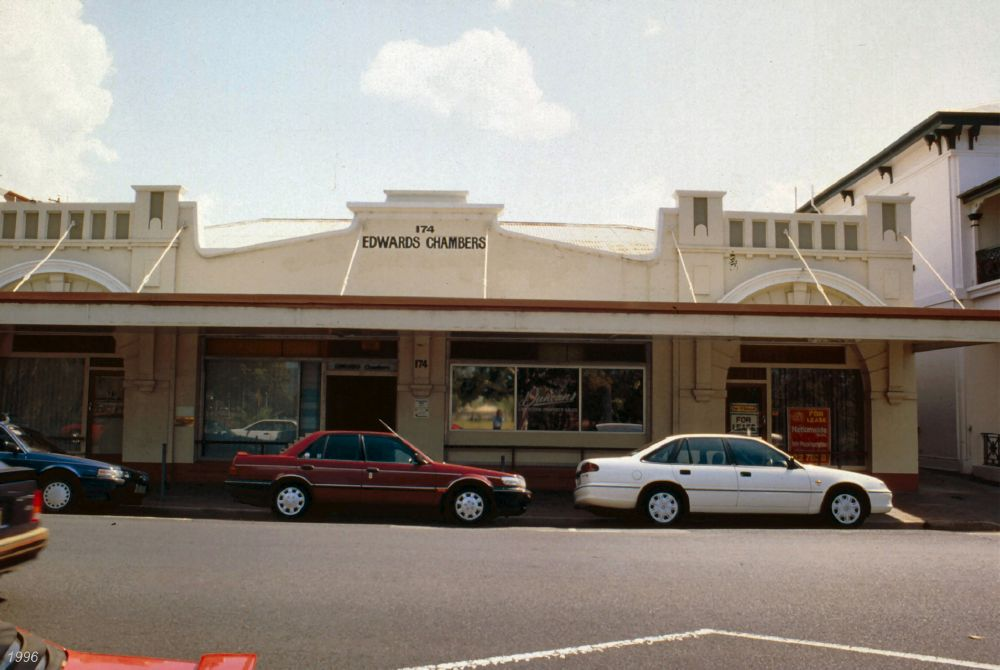
- C J Edwards Chambers, 1997

- Location within Queensland Location within Australia
- 23.3771°S 150.5138°E
- Location: 174 Quay Street, Rockhampton, Rockhampton Region, Queensland, Australia

History
- Design period: 1914–1919 (World War I)
- Built: 1914

Site notes
- Architect: Edwin Morton Hockings

Queensland Heritage Register
- Official name: C J Edwards Chambers, River Motors Pty Ltd, Rockhampton Motors Garage and Engineers, Sydney V Golik and Co Motor and Car Truck Dealers
- Type: state heritage (built)
- Designated: 21 October 1992
- Reference no.: 600803
- Significant period: 1910s (fabric); 1914–1959 (historical use)

C J Edwards Chambers is a heritage-listed riparian office building at 174 Quay Street, Rockhampton, Rockhampton Region, Queensland, Australia. It was designed by Edwin Morton Hockings and built in 1914. It is also known as River Motors Pty Ltd, Rockhampton Motors Garage and Engineers, and Sydney V Golik and Co Motor and Car Truck Dealers. It was added to the Queensland Heritage Register on 21 October 1992.

== History ==
Edwards Chambers was constructed in 1914 as a motor garage for the Howard Motor & Cycle company of Rockhampton. It is representative of an early motor garage in a provincial city.

The Archer brothers had made a private expedition to the Rockhampton district in 1853, and were the first Europeans to record and chart the Fitzroy River. In 1855 the Archers overlanded cattle to the region of the Fitzroy.

After the short lived Canoona gold rush of 1858, Rockhampton was proclaimed as a town and declared a "port of entry" in 1858. The first sale of town allotments was held in Rockhampton on 17 and 18 November in the same year. In May 1859 Frederick Robert Hutchinson applied for title to land along the forefront of what is now Quay Street not far from the Archer landing place.

Hutchinson had been an early arrival in Rockhampton. At the time of the Canoona gold rush he was appointed as the Clerk of Petty Sessions. For Hutchinson this was a time of great social disturbance coping with the aftermath of several thousand diggers descending onto a settlement consisting of three buildings and a small wharf.

In May 1859 Huthchinson had written a letter to the New South Wales colonial government in Sydney (the separation of Queensland did not occur until December 1859) requesting the construction of a public wharf (Queens wharf) for the loading and unloading of vessels. In the same period Hutchinson was also requesting that the government provide public works in Rockhampton especially roads, as the tracks existing in the town at that time were impassable. In 1860 Hutchinson, Hunter and Company established a store at this location in Quay Street. The store traded mainly for pastoralists heading into the interior of central Queensland.

In June 1895 a Certificate of Title was issued on Allotment 7 of Section 45. The Certificate of title was issued to George Ranken of Young, and Harriet Ann Cathcart Hutchinson of Windsor. She was described as being the widow of Frederick Hutchinson, orchardist of Mildura. George Ranken died on 6 May 1895.

In October 1913 James Howard purchased the property. James Howard was a well known name in the motor vehicle and cycle business in Rockhampton. Howard had a business listed in the Post Office Directory as a bicycle depot and importer since 1897. In 1898 James Howard's father William had constructed for himself the first motor cycle in Rockhampton, a tandem bicycle with a single cylinder 4 h.p. engine attached. The Howard business was situated at 95 East Street opposite the Rockhampton Post Office. The business acted as a cycle importer until 1907, when Howard & Co. listed themselves as "cycle and motor dealers."

Howard & Co. was one of the first businesses in Rockhampton to cater for the sale of motor vehicles and motorcycles. The horseless carriage had made its first appearance in central Queensland in 1902 when Dr FH Voss became the owner of a steam powered locomobile. He eventually sold this vehicle to W Howard who then converted it into a car powered by an internal combustion engine. W Howard was referred to as the father of the automobile industry in Rockhampton.

Howard & Co opened a branch of the company in Brisbane in 1903. Premises were initially at 333 Queen Street, before moving to 376 Queen Street in 1906. A new showroom, workshop and garage was opened at 303 Adelaide Street in 1909. Howard & Co were also to open other branches of the business in Hope Street, South Brisbane, Ipswich, Maryborough and Neil Street, Toowoomba, at later periods.

Agencies for the company were to expand into most country towns in Queensland. The Adelaide Street building was described in 1913 as being a spacious and handsome motor garage. The workshop, garage and display area occupied half an acre of floor space. The company at this period employed between 60 and 80 people in Brisbane, and was producing 1000 bicycles a year from its workshops.

In 1909 the Rockhampton Post Office directory listed the business as Howard Motor and Cycle Co. Ltd (late Jas Howard & Co.), cycle & motor manufacturers and importers, indicating a name change by the company. In the 1913–14 directory the business was listed as being the Rockhampton branch of Howard Motor & Cycle Co. Ltd "carrying large stocks of cycle and motor sundries." Repairs were carried out on motor cars, motor cycles and bicycles in the East Street office and workshops. Howard Motor & Cycle Co Ltd operated the motor dealership for vehicles from companies such as Buick, Cadillac, Dennis motor lorries, Wolseley, B.S.A. and motor cycles from Triumph and New Hudson.

In the period of 1906–15 four bicycle and motor dealers were trading in Rockhampton, Howard Motor & Cycle Co Ltd, A E Beal, Canada Cycle & Motor Agency at the corner of William and Fitzroy Streets, and Theo Kingel's bicycle factory in Bolsover street which was the local Ford dealer. The C C M Garage was the largest of the garages operating in Rockhampton until 1914.

The evolution of motor transport in Rockhampton was similar to the experience in Brisbane. Private vehicles were imported from overseas manufacturers, sold by the local dealerships, and maintained by the companies mentioned above. By October 1913 The Morning Bulletin commented on the growth of the motor industry, with vehicles being purchased for commercial purposes, and the modifications carried out by local workshops and garages:

"Motor vehicles are gradually being brought into use in Rockhampton for business purposes... Messrs T McLaughlin have purchased from the Howard Motor and Cycle Company, a two ton Dennis four cylinder, twenty eight horse power motor lorry... The body of the lorry was built by Mr Walley and fitted up in the Howard Motor Cycle Company's garage."

Following Howard's purchase of the land in Quay Street in October, tenders were called by Edwin Morton Hockings, the architect on 15 December 1913 for the erection of a concrete garage in Quay Street for the Howard Motor & Cycle Company. The new garage was part of the expansion and diversification of the company in Rockhampton.

Edwin Morton Hockings (1870–1942) was the son of Albert John Hockings one of the early mayors of Brisbane. Edwin Hockings was educated at Brisbane Grammar School, and became the articled pupil of architect Richard Gailey. In 1890 Hockings won a design competition for the Rockhampton Girls Grammar School. Gailey's office took over documentation of the building and Hockings went to Rockhampton as clerk of works. He began his own architectural practice in Rockhampton in the mid 1890s. Hockings enlisted and served in the Third Queensland Contingent during the Boer War, and re-enlisted and served during the First World War.

Hockings formed partnerships with A M Hutton from 1898 until 1904 and LT Palmer from 1916 until 1938. Hockings was architect on buildings such as St Peter's Church of England, Barcaldine (1898–99) and the Rockhampton Town Hall (1939–41).

On 1 July 1914 a lease was taken out by Howard Motor & Cycle Co. Ltd for five years at £321 per year on 174 Quay Street. The garage was opened by July 1914, as advertisements in the Morning Bulletin refer to the Howard Motor & Cycle Co. garage in Quay Street. The business was referred to as Howard's Motor Garage. Howard Motor & Cycle Co. Ltd also continued to trade from the East Street premises, using these as its show rooms. Howard's Motor Garage registered itself as an importer of motor cars and accessories, with repair work by skilled mechanics.

The building was designed as a motor show room and garage, with two entrances either side of the central show/ work area. Access to the front part of the building was through the arched doorways. Motor vehicles from companies such as Buick were delivered by ship to the town wharves. Vehicles were then driven up Quay Street to the Motor Garage from the wharves.

In 1927–28 the Howard Motor Garage was renamed the Rockhampton Motor Garage and Engineers, although it traded as Rockhampton Motors Ltd. The Howard Motor & Cycle Co Ltd had changed its name in 1925 and transferred the lease on the property to ownership. In 1929 Howard Motor Co Ltd changed its name to Howard Investment Co Ltd.

The Howard Investment Co. Ltd had a further name change to Howard Ltd in 1932. The Howard Motor Garage changed its name in 1938 to become River Motors Pty Ltd - Motor Car Dealers. River Motors opened a second office at 72 William Street, Rockhampton in 1941.

A plan of the re-subdivision of allotment 7 in June 1945 shows a main building identified as River Motors with several ancillary buildings fronting on to Quay Lane. These are identified as a lavatory fronting on to Quay Lane (enlarged in 1944), wood and fibro shower sheds, and a shed. Two areas were also identified at the rear of the allotment as being a washing section and a greasing section. A gate gave access on to Quay Lane between the washing section and lavatories.

The dealership changed hands in 1947 to become Sydney V Golik and Co. Motor Car and Truck Dealers. The premises in Quay Street continued to be run as a motor show room, however an addition had been made to the rear of the building when a galvanised extension was constructed to act as a workshop and repair facility. Agricultural vehicles such as tractors and ploughs, were also displayed on the premises. At the time that the dealership changed hands a large electric advertising sign was fixed to the front of the building. A photograph from 1955 shows the building with an awning smaller than the present one affixed to the front of the building.

In 1959, CJ Edwards and Co. Ltd bought the property from Howard Ltd. The former garage, workshop and showroom was then converted into several businesses operating from the one building in 1960 at a cost of £3000. C J Edwards was a public accountant company, leasing several professional offices and businesses. With the change in use of the building from a workshop to offices major internal changes were made to the building but the ceiling was left untouched. Garage space for the tenants was also increased in 1963.

Various tenants in the chambers have included apart from CJ Edwards real estate agents as well as other semi professional offices. In 1987 further alterations were made to offices in the interior of the building.

In 2015, the building is occupied by a number of businesses including Foxlaw.

== Description ==
Edwards Chambers is a simple single storeyed building on Quay Street Rockhampton, situated overlooking the Fitzroy River. The building extends to the Quay Lane boundary of the site, with access provided via a doorway to the rear of the adjacent Trustee Chambers' site.

The building is constructed with rendered masonry walls supporting a corrugated iron roof. The roof has a hipped section running parallel to the Quay Street facade perpendicular to which two long hipped sections run, forming a U-shaped ridge, ventilated in places with a long corrugated iron ridge ventilators. The roof is partially concealed by the Quay Street facade which extends beyond the line of the roof and on the long elevations by simple parapets.

The Quay Street facade of the building is symmetrically composed and dominated by a cantilevered awning running along the entire face and interrupting the composition. The facade comprises a central section with decorative, curved parapet profile, capped with a decorative moulding. The face of the parapet has the lettering "EDWARDS CHAMBERS" painted centrally and the number of the building above. At the street level of this section several openings for both windows and glazed doors have been inserted, and these are separated by corbelled mouldings. Flanking this central section are symmetrical end bays featuring large archways with architraves and keystone and voussoir elements scoured in the render. Though previously opened these archways, identifiable only above the awning, have been filled with glazed doors and windows, forming shopfronts. A panelled section of rendered masonry forms the parapet to these end bays.

The south eastern side party wall is shared with the one storeyed building adjacent to Edwards Chambers. The north western concrete wall has several small infilled openings at the far end where toilets are located internally. Surface mounted water pipes run the over this wall.

Because the building was originally a showroom, the interior was simply designed as a large open space and is therefore with subsequent renovation devoid of any features which suggest its early date. A 1970s office fitout has been inserted into the building and this comprises a central hall off which many small tenancies are accessed. These are formed with glazed and plasterboard partitioning, a suspended ceiling grid with fibrous cement panels, and a ceramic tiled floor. Many of the walls in the offices are veneered with acrylic timber cladding and carpeted. The rear section of the building, separated by a concrete wall is a large unceiled shed which extends to the Quay Lane boundary.

== Heritage listing ==
C J Edwards Chambers was listed on the Queensland Heritage Register on 21 October 1992 having satisfied the following criteria.

The place is important in demonstrating the evolution or pattern of Queensland's history.

Edwards Chambers built as a car garage is important in demonstrating the evolution of motor transport in Rockhampton and central Queensland. The building demonstrates the servicing requirements associated with the introduction of motor transport in the early part of the twentieth century. Edwards Chambers is an example of a purpose built motor vehicle garage and service centre established in a provincial centre in Queensland in the early twentieth century, and is a surviving example of a substantially intact motor garage building. Edwards Chambers has architectural significance as an example of a precursor to modernism linked with the establishment of motor transport. The building illustrates an early parallel between the development of the automobile industry and the design of the buildings accommodating this industry.

The place has a special association with the life or work of a particular person, group or organisation of importance in Queensland's history.

Edwards Chambers has an association with the development of the motor industry in Rockhampton, and the company founded by Howard & Co which was one of the first businesses in Rockhampton to cater for the sale of motor vehicles and motorcycles. Howard & Co were to establish branches in Brisbane and throughout Queensland to become one of the major automotive dealers and suppliers in the state in the period of 1920–1950.

Edwards Chambers has a special association with the life and work of E M Hockings, architect. Hockings practiced in Rockhampton from the mid 1890s until 1940, producing some of the regions most impressive edifices, including the Rockhampton Girls Grammar School (1890), St Peter's Church of England, Barcaldine (1898–9) and the Rockhampton City Hall (1939–41).
