= Rockhampton Town Hall =

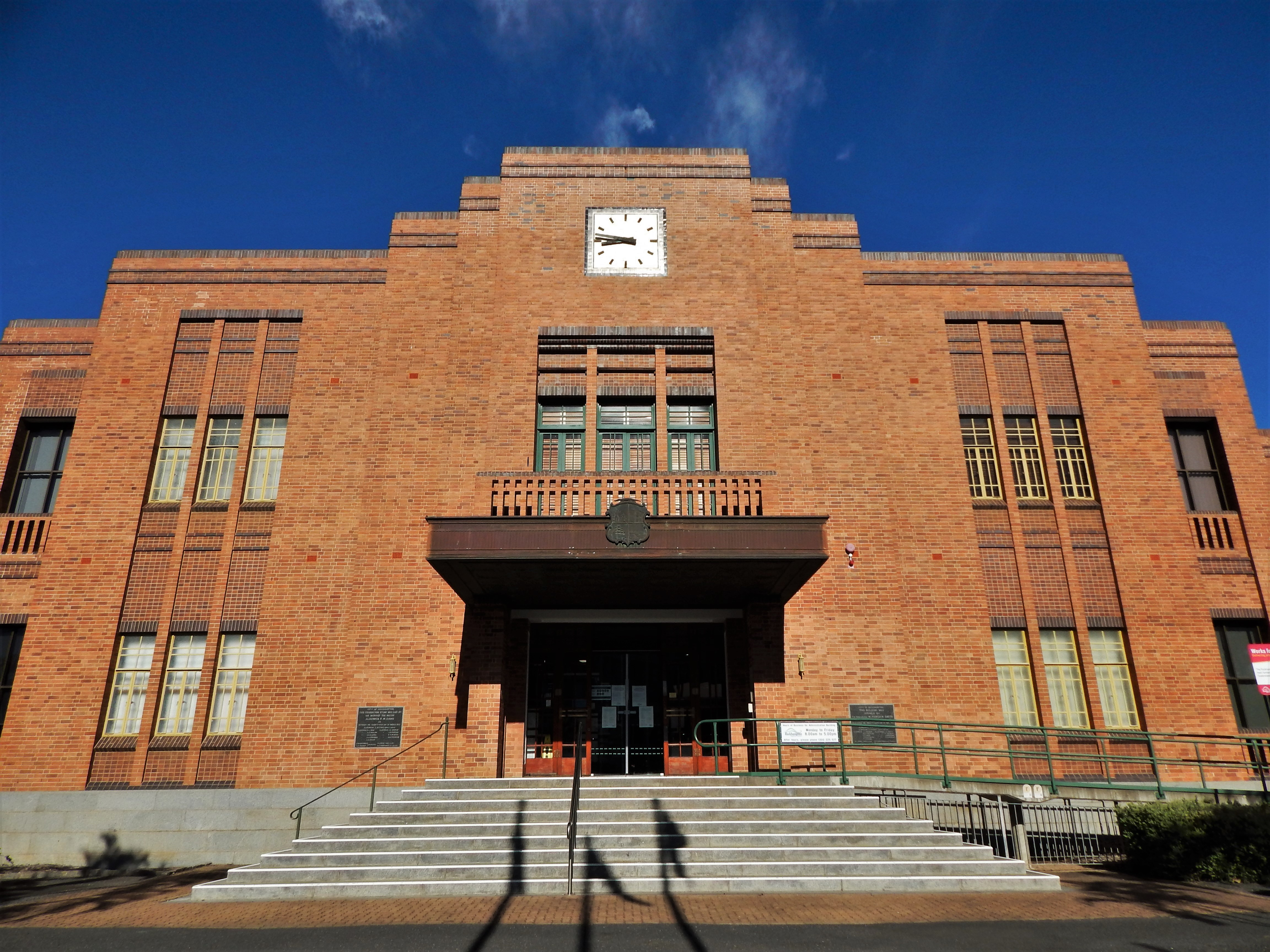
- Rockhampton City Hall, 2020

- Location within Queensland Location within Australia
- 23.3819°S 150.5137°E
- Location: 232 Bolsover Street, Rockhampton City, Rockhampton, Rockhampton Region, Queensland, Australia

History
- Design period: 1919–1930s (interwar period)
- Built: 1939–1941
- Built for: Rockhampton City Council

Site notes
- Architect: Hockings & Palmer
- Architectural style: Classicism

Queensland Heritage Register
- Official name: Rockhampton Town Hall, Rockhampton City Hall, Rockhampton Council Chambers
- Type: state heritage (landscape, built)
- Designated: 29 April 2003
- Reference no.: 601572
- Significant period: 1930s–1940s (historical); 1939–ongoing (social); 1940s (fabric)
- Significant components: views to, foyer – entrance, furniture/fittings, office/s, garden/grounds, council chamber/meeting room, trees/plantings
- Builders: John Hutchinson (J. Hutchinson & Sons – now Hutchinson Builders)

Rockhampton Town Hall is a heritage-listed town hall at 232 Bolsover Street, Rockhampton City, Rockhampton, Rockhampton Region, Queensland, Australia. It was designed by Hockings & Palmer and built from 1939 to 1941 by John Hutchinson of J. Hutchinson & Sons (now Hutchinson Builders). It is also known as Rockhampton City Hall and Rockhampton Council Chambers. It was added to the Queensland Heritage Register on 29 April 2003.

== History ==
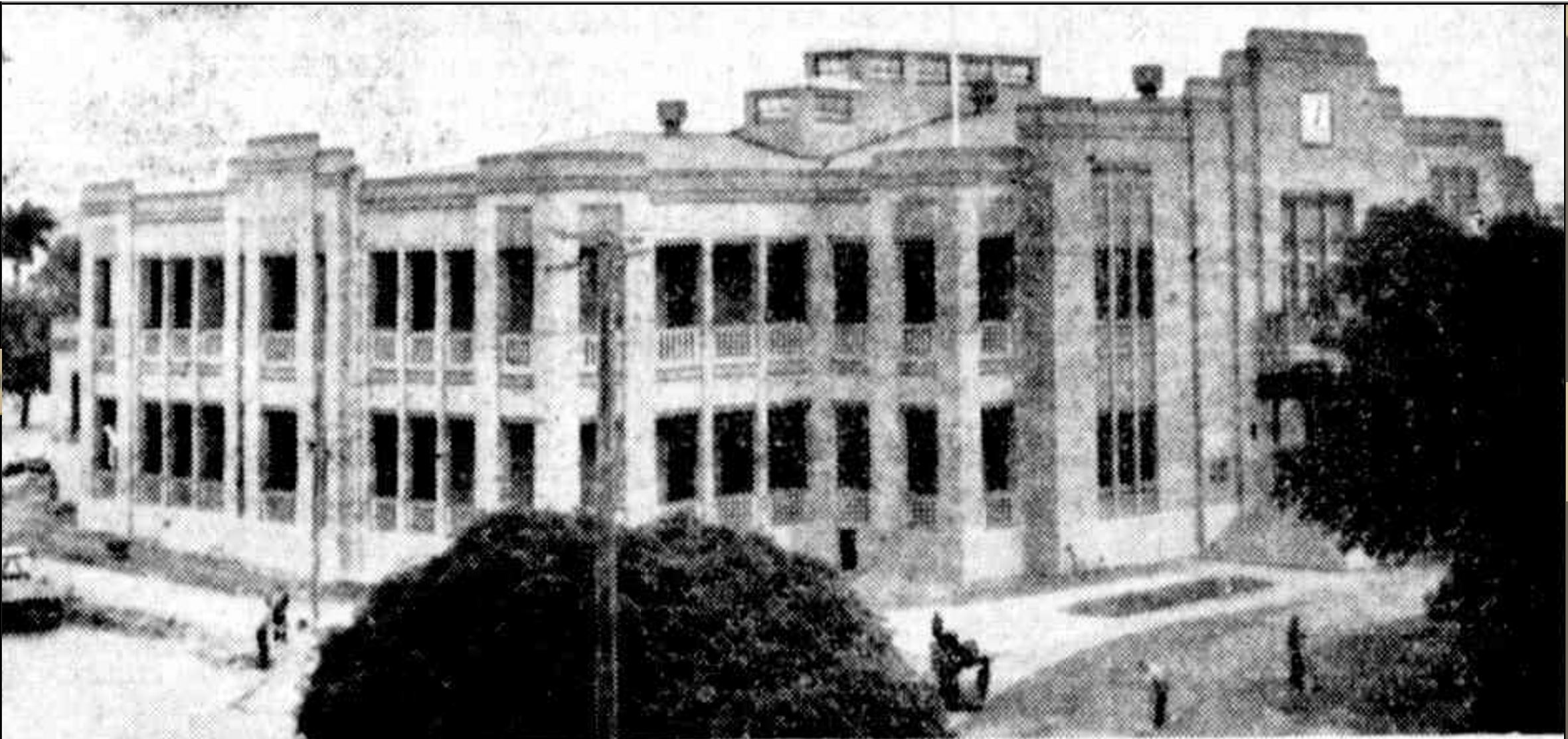
Rockhampton Town Hall, 1941

Rockhampton emerged as an important Queensland regional centre during the 1850s and 1860s. This development took on especial prominence after the discovery of the mining wealth at Mount Morgan in 1882. The additional affluence that flowed on for Rockhampton fuelled a rapid expansion of public and private buildings and residences throughout the City and surrounds. This building boom allowed for many grand places to be constructed, especially renowned along the commercial and government sector near the wharves on Quay Street, to the many elite residences found on "The Range". Despite this building expansion into the 1900s, Rockhampton never achieved a purpose-built Town Hall until 1941.

An 1878 reference to premises utilised by Rockhampton's Council, stated:

"Our municipal edifices are more useful than ornamental. The Council Chambers (by one aspiring Mayor denominated "Temporary Town Hall") are of wood and iron, lined, in an airy spot, and well verandahed; on an adjoining reserve the Fire Engine Shed, and Kerosene Store, are erected."

On 21 June 1897, a foundation stone for the future town hall was laid by Rockhampton Mayor Mr Littler to mark the occasion of Queen Victoria's Diamond Jubilee. At this occasion Mr Littler let it be known that the Council could not proceed immediately with the building, but felt that construction would probably be able to commence some time over the next ten years. Although occasionally referred to in election speeches through the ensuing years, it wasn't until 1936 that the Council decided to invite designs for a town hall.

Seven designs were submitted by Rockhampton and Brisbane architects, but for various reasons, particularly financial, none of these designs were found satisfactory. It wasn't until an amended design, originally submitted by the Rockhampton architectural firm of Hockings and Palmer, was accepted and the contract let to the firm of John Hutchinson and Sons (of Brisbane), before construction was able commence.

Edwin Morton Hockings (1870–1942) commenced his architectural career under the tutelage of Brisbane architect Richard Gailey. Hockings career took a major change in 1890 with his success in winning a design competition for the new Rockhampton Girls Grammar School. Though Gailey's firm took over the final design work, Hockings departed to Rockhampton as the firm's clerk of works. In 1895 he was elected an Associate of the Queensland Institute of Architects, and thereafter commenced his own practice in Rockhampton from where he made his design mark throughout Central Queensland.

Hockings saw service and was wounded in the Anglo-Boer War (1899–1902), where he commanded a Squadron of the Third Queensland Contingent. In this period he also formed a productive partnership (Hutton and Hockings, Architects and Building Surveyors) with A.M. Hutton, 1898–1904. Hockings went on the serve in the early part of World War One, but again returned to an architectural profession, forming another successful partnership (Hockings and Palmer) in Rockhampton with Leslie Tarween Palmer, 1916–1938. Hockings went on to form a final partnership with his son, Thomas Hocking (E.M. and T. Hockings/Hockings and Son), 1939–40. Edwin Morton Hockings survived to see the completion of his last major work, Rockhampton's Town Hall, and died in Rockhampton on 21 December 1942.

On 25 February 1939, Rockhampton's Mayor Mr R. Will Evans (1936–43), turned the first sod for the start of work on the new Town Hall, followed a month later (on 25 March) by the laying of the foundation stone. Progress though was delayed, mainly the result of a temporary shortage of building materials and wet weather particularly during the construction of the foundations. The cost of construction of this new Town Hall was approximately £50,000, and in the end took two years to complete "this massive block, which in size, design and appointments surpasses any civic centre in Queensland outside of Brisbane."

During World War II a great deal of responsibility rested on the shoulders of the two war-time Mayors, R. Will Evans (1936–43) and Henry Jeffries (1943–52). From August 1942, Rockhampton's Town Hall became the headquarters for General Robert L. Eichelberger and the 41st Infantry Division of the United States Army. Rockhampton City Council virtually placed the City at the disposal of army authorities, both Australian and American, and so, in turn, contributed to Australia's defence during the Pacific Campaign (1941–45).

In 2015, the Rockhampton Town Hall continues to function as the hub of the Rockhampton Regional Council's operations.

== Description ==
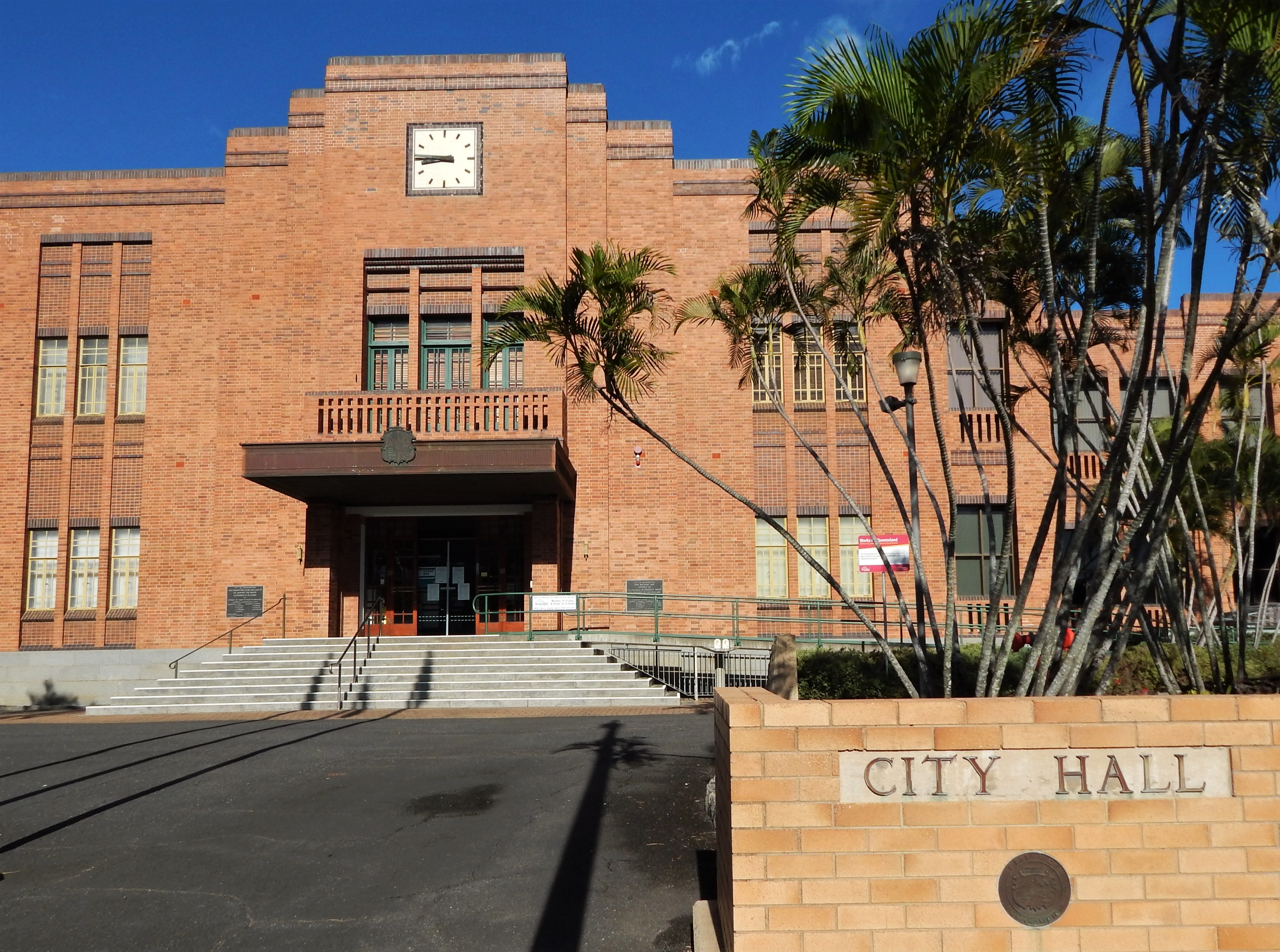
Rockhampton City Hall, 2020

Rockhampton's Town Hall, addressing Bolsover Street in the city centre, is an imposing two-storey brick building on a granite plinth, which contains the town hall and offices. The freestanding building sits within expansive grounds known as the Town Hall Reserve. These grounds, being mostly level, have simple designs of lawns and mature trees including plantings of Cuban Royal Palms (Roystonea regia), Traveller's Palms (Ravenala madagascariensis), and other species.

All four of the building's facades are similar symmetrical articulated planes of face brickwork with projecting bays, stepped parapet and verandahs to both levels for most of the perimeter (although many of the verandah areas have been infilled). Whilst the principal facade addresses Bolsover Street, the building's other three facades can be viewed from Derby, Alma and William Streets, although other buildings sit within the block.

The articulation of the brickwork and set out of openings reflects classical proportions of columns, spandrels, balustrades and entablatures. The facades are stepped, both horizontally in the projecting and recessing of facade bays, as well as vertically in the parapet. The brickwork is laid in a version of Flemish bond, with two stretchers and one header alternating in each course. Darker bricks emphasise string courses, opening lintels and sills, and the parapet capping.

The main entrance, centred on the north-eastern Bolsover Street facade, is approached by a broad flight of granite steps, returned at each end. Over this entrance is a cantilevered awning clad in bronze which carries the City's coat of arms. Above the awning is a small balcony opening from the Council Chamber and over that is a clock of ceramic tiles.

Inside the glazed entrance doors, the entrance foyer has a marble dado to doorhead height and a high plaster ceiling with broad cornice. From the entrance foyer, the main stair of polished timber has a broad lower flight to a mid-landing, then quarter-turn upper flights on both sides. Above the upper flights is a clerestory window lighting the stair and the upper foyer.

The Council Chamber, reached from the upper foyer, has high dadoes of timber panelling, parquetry flooring and a high plaster ceiling with cornices between exposed beams.

== Heritage listing ==
Rockhampton Town Hall was listed on the Queensland Heritage Register on 29 April 2003 having satisfied the following criteria.

The place is important in demonstrating the evolution or pattern of Queensland's history.

Rockhampton's Town Hall clearly demonstrates the evolution or pattern of Queensland history, in this case, purpose-built for the needs of local government for the regional centre of Rockhampton.

The place is important in demonstrating the principal characteristics of a particular class of cultural places.

This Town Hall also demonstrates the principal characteristics of a building designed for the use, operation, and the tropical climate of this regional city council.

The place is important because of its aesthetic significance.

This Town Hall also exhibits particular aesthetic characteristics valued by the local and broader community. It is a prominent feature of the townscape of Rockhampton's city centre and is a substantial and imposing public building of articulated brickwork, incorporating stripped classical and art deco stylistic elements.

The place has a strong or special association with a particular community or cultural group for social, cultural or spiritual reasons.

This place has a strong association with the Rockhampton community for social and cultural reasons, as well as being the last major work by noted Rockhampton architect, Edwin Morton Hockings (1870–1942). Rockhampton's Town Hall also possesses a special association with the life, work and families of the City's council staff, mayors and aldermen.
