= Walter Reid Court =

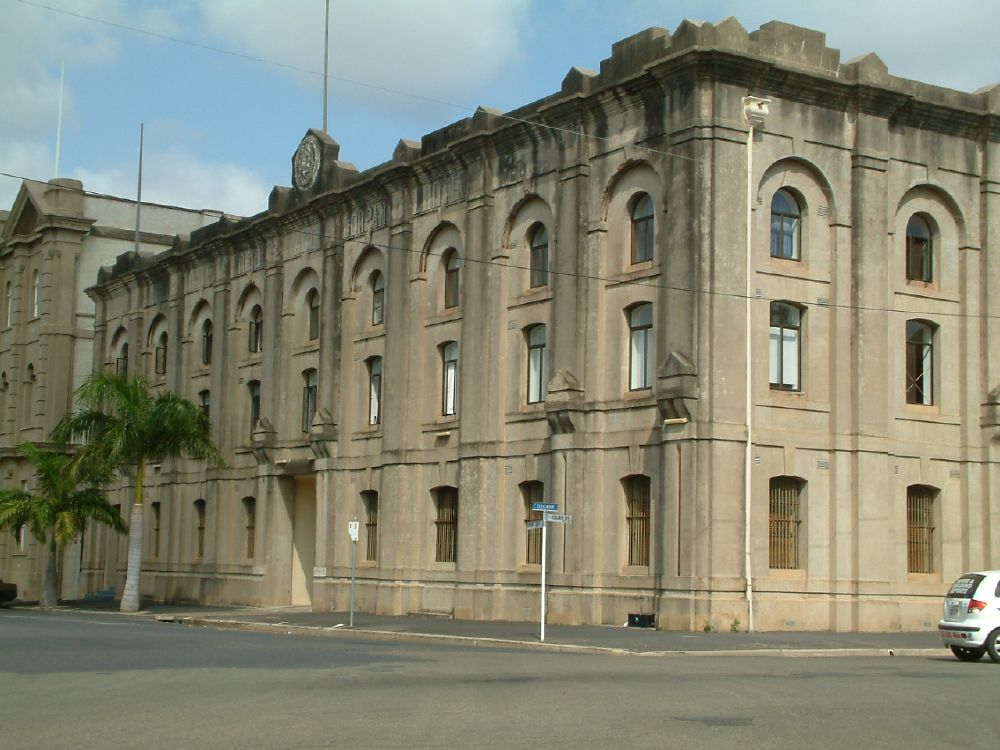
- Walter Reid Court, 2004

- Location within Queensland Location within Australia
- 23.381°S 150.5164°E
- Location: 260 Quay Street, Rockhampton, Rockhampton Region, Queensland, Australia

History
- Design period: 1870s–1890s (late 19th century)
- Built: 1893–c. 1918

Site notes
- Architect: Richard Gailey

Queensland Heritage Register
- Official name: Walter Reid Court, Walter Reid & Co
- Type: state heritage (built)
- Designated: 21 October 1992
- Reference no.: 600815
- Significant period: 1890s (fabric); 1893–1970s (historical use)
- Significant components: courtyard

Walter Reid Court is a heritage-listed former warehouse now converted into apartments at 260 Quay Street, Rockhampton, Rockhampton Region, Queensland, Australia. It was designed by Richard Gailey and built from 1893 to c. 1918. It is also known as Walter Reid & Co. It was added to the Queensland Heritage Register on 21 October 1992.

== History ==
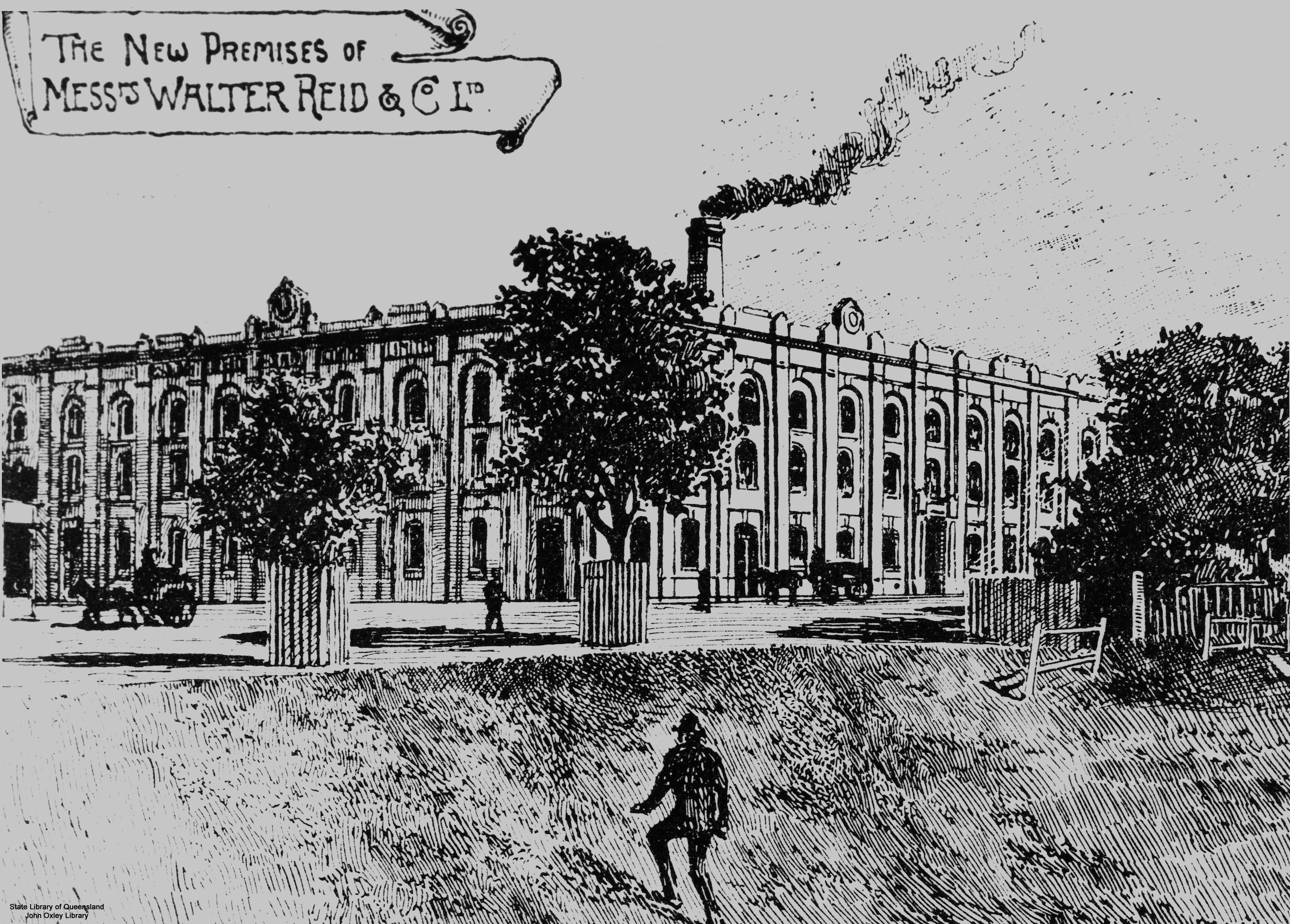
Walter Reid & Co warehouse, 1894 (now Walter Reid Court)

The former Walter Reid & Co warehouse in Quay Street, Rockhampton was erected for Walter Reid & Co in 1893 to the design of Richard Gailey. The three-storeyed rendered brickwork warehouse was the first of the two large Walter Reid warehouses to be constructed in Rockhampton which now dominate the precinct of similarly scaled structures in the area. It was part of the commercial infrastructure which developed near the wharves during a boom period in Rockhampton from the 1880s to the turn of the century. The structure displays its original design externally but has been rebuilt internally at least twice.

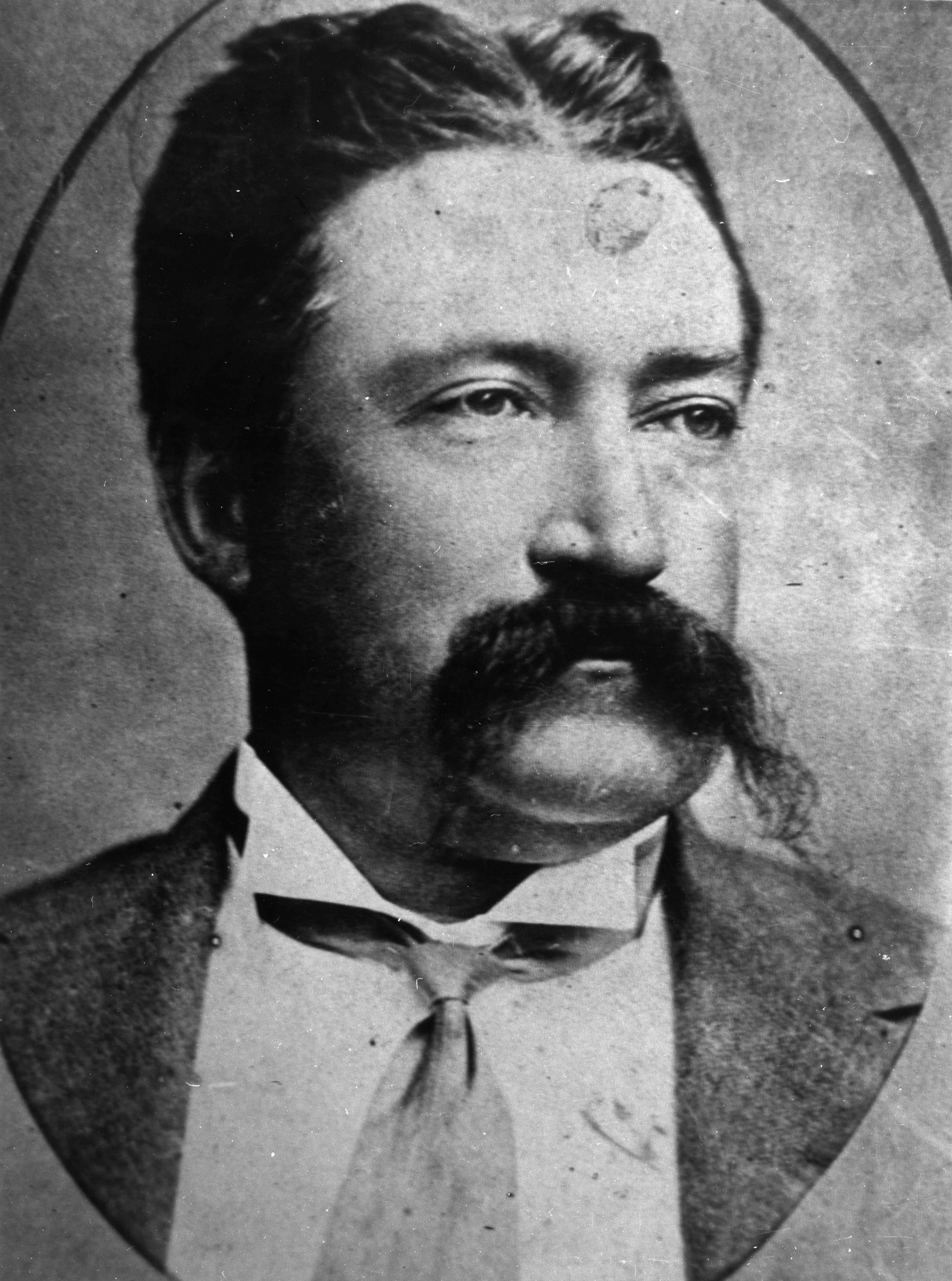
Walter Reid, merchant of Rockhampton

Walter Reid, the founder of Rockhampton's premier mercantile house Walter Reid & Co., settled in Rockhampton in 1862 to manage a southern owned retail store in East Street which he subsequently bought in 1864. He moved from his shop to new premises situated in Quay Street in 1868. It was in these new premises where Reid began to specialise as a wholesaler, trading in wine, spirits and general merchandise, supplying the hotels and stations in central Western Queensland. Since Rockhampton had been declared an official port in 1858, it had acted as the major transport and trade centre of central Queensland making it a prosperous city in which wholesale merchants like Reid could base their business.

Walter Reid's business prospered in the expanding colonial economy. With the establishment, in 1867, of the Central Western railway line which linked Rockhampton with the central western Queensland towns, Rockhampton's position as the most important port in the region was sealed. Reid diversified his interests, and ran lighters down the Fitzroy River to Keppel Bay where larger overseas ships unloaded their cargoes. The firm acted as a local agent for British-based companies and it was through this business connection that the British company McIlwraith & McEachearn bought Reid out in 1881.

The new owners continued to operate the business under the name of Walter Reid & Co. and during the 1880s the turnover was in the vicinity of £50,000 per annum. The firm acted as general merchants distributing groceries, ales, domestic and builders' hardware, farm produce, "fancy" goods, rural products, drugs, stationery, confectionery, and cigarettes. It also acted as importers and exporters, bondkeepers, storekeepers, produce dealers, shipowners, insurance, stock and station agents, financial agents and general commission agents. By 1890 the business had expanded so dramatically that new premises were needed.

Tenders were called for the erection of a warehouse at Rockhampton for Walter Reid & Co. in December 1892 by Brisbane architect Richard Gailey. Richard Gailey was a prolific architect in Queensland in the late 19th century and designed numerous warehouses in Brisbane and other ports around the colony. The former Walter Reid & Co. warehouse was reported to have cost about £12,000 and was completed in 1893 at which time Walter Reid & Co. took residence in the new warehouse on the corner of Quay and Derby Streets. In 1895 alterations were made to the building by Rockhampton architects Eaton & Bates who designed an entrance vestibule and office fittings for the warehouse which was also used as Walter Reid & Co.'s head office. This alteration was most likely positioned at the southern end of the Quay Street frontage.

The prosperity which Walter Reid & Co had enjoyed throughout the 1880s was reflective of the wealth in Rockhampton during this period. The immense profit generated by gold mining at Mount Morgan from 1882 created a period of economic buoyancy in the city. The success of the firm during the 1880s manifested in the erection of the warehouse and helped it withstand the depression years of the 1890s and the following devastation which drought brought to Queensland in the early 1900s. In 1902 Walter Reid & Co. erected a second warehouse (now the Walter Reid Community Arts Centre) on the corner of East and Derby Streets, behind the original warehouse across Quay Lane, which was completed in 1904 and designed by Rockhampton architects Hutton & Hockings. The obvious presence of these grand warehouses reflected the prominence of Walter Reid as the major mercantile company in central Queensland.

Walter Reid & Company continued to expand importing goods directly from England, America, Europe and India at the turn of the century. A new produce store was built on the corner of Stanley and East Streets, and later a brick wool store on the corner of Stanley and Quay Streets. In 1904 Walter Reid & Co took over one of the oldest established wine and spirit merchants in Brisbane, Brabant & Co, as well as a subsidiary business in Mackay, WH Paxton & Co. A Sydney office was established in the 1910s and in the 1920s a large and expensive warehouse was built in the centre of Sydney.

During this time the 1893 warehouse underwent considerable change. On 11 October 1912 the warehouse was gutted, except in the south-west corner of the building, by fire which was started by lightning striking the roof on the corner of Quay and Derby Streets. A contemporary description from the Morning Bulletin of the path of the fire in the warehouse gives some idea of the building's original design.

The original design did not include an open courtyard, instead the second level was entirely covered by a roof. The ground and first levels had two two-storey high passageways which extended from Derby Street and Quay Lane and met at right angles, separating the south- western corner of the building from the rest of the structure. During the fire the passageways acted as fire-breaks preventing the destruction of that section of the building. The fire was said to have descended to the lower levels through a lift-well "at one end of the building in Quay Street" indicating the position of a lift near the Quay Street frontage. The rapid spread of the fire through the second level was attributed to the open planning of the floor which was most likely changed in the reconstruction of the interior of the building to increase resistance to fire damage. The installation of the courtyard could have occurred after the 1912 fire, although, apparently there was another fire in 1918 which also gutted the building requiring internal reconstruction. However the description of the building in 1912 indicates the courtyard was not an original component of the building. The description also referred to the "charred smoking beams" indicating the typical use of timber inside the original warehouse.

During the Second World War both Walter Reid & Co. warehouses on Quay and East Streets were used by U.S. troops. A large contingent of Americans were based in Rockhampton and they commandeered many buildings in the city. It is not certain for which purpose the Americans used the Quay Street warehouse, but Walter Reid & Co. continued to use the warehouse during the occupation.

Walter Reid & Co. was well enough established to survive the winding down of operations at the port in the middle of the 20th century and its main activities were no longer focussed on the river wharves. However, by the 1970s the firm was experiencing losses in its grocery wholesaling department due to changes in shopping practices since the 1950s. The company decided to move out of grocery wholesaling and was relocated to North Rockhampton where it continued under the name of 'Reid's'.

Both of Walter Reid & Co.'s major warehouses in Rockhampton were sold in the 1970s. In 1979 the Quay Street building was purchased by St Andrew's Presbyterian Church Welfare Administration who intended to convert the old warehouse into a hospital. At this time the former warehouse was once again stripped internally in preparation for the conversion which did not occur. Instead the building was transferred in August 1980 to H Katranevas, G Callionotis, Halmont Holdings Pty Ltd and Swanray Pty Ltd and was intended for conversion to inner-city residential apartments. In October 1981 the building was purchased by Albecs Holdings, Degotard Investments and Watlepark Investments. The new apartments opened in 1983.

== Description ==
Walter Reid Court, a three-storeyed unpainted cement rendered masonry former warehouse structure, is located on the western corner of Quay and Derby Streets. The building is separated from the Walter Reid Community Arts Centre, another former warehouse, by Quay Lane to the southwest.

The building has a U-shaped plan, with masonry cross walls forming an enclosed courtyard space on the northwestern side. All of the original internal fabric has been removed, however the exterior remains largely intact, and to a lesser extent some of the early internal masonry walls which form the courtyard space. The building now has reinforced concrete floors and columns, and houses 16 flats, a solarium containing a swimming pool and sauna, garage space, and associated common areas.

The exterior of the building is composed of regularly spaced bays separated by engaged piers. The building has an expressed base, and expressed coursing separates the ground and first floors. The roof is concealed behind a parapet wall consisting of a cornice supporting short pillars with gabled crowns. The parapet is surmounted by a central shield shaped ornament, with the firm's name and coat of arms in relief, located above the central bay to the Quay and Derby Street elevations. Lower stepped ornaments are located above the end bays, and a number of flagpoles survive mounted behind the parapet. The name WALTER REID AND COMPANY LIMITED is located in relief on the frieze within the central five bays to the Quay and Derby Street elevations.

The Quay and Derby Street elevations have a three-storeyed recessed arch with expressed keystone to each bay. This arch frames a single window opening to each floor, with an arched opening to the second floor, and segmental arches to the lower floors. The ground floor window opening also has security bars and an expressed keystone, and all windows have been replaced with metal framed casements to the upper two floors and sash frames to the ground floor.

The Derby Street elevation has a vehicle entrance with a recessed roller door located in the central bay, and an entrance to a private flat is located in the southwest end bay. Both entrances are framed at the first floor level by projecting gablets supported by corbels from the engaged piers. This framing device is also used at the northeast end bay, which currently houses a window, and suggests this may have originally housed an entrance. An earlier doorway which has been converted into a window is located in the third bay from the eastern corner. The Quay Street elevation contains the main entrance to the complex, which consists of a metal framed glass door and fanlight with the name WALTER REID COURT in relief lettering above, located in the third bay from the eastern corner. The framing device used for the Derby Street entrances is also used for this entrance, and also on the third bay from the northern end which currently houses a window but suggests this may have originally housed an entrance.

The Quay Lane elevation is similar to the Derby Street elevation, but the ground floor has a number of roller doors inserted into the central bays. The window openings to this elevation have early multi- paned metal framed casement windows with wired glass panes.

The northwest elevation has no fenestration, with three bays at either end and a blank wall to the central section. These bays are regularly spaced, and are separated by engaged piers with a three-storeyed recessed arch with expressed keystone to each bay. The parapet detailing is similar to the principal elevations, and the firm's name is located in relief on the frieze to the three bays at each end. The ground floor has a fire escape door to the central section, and a roller door has been inserted into the third bay from the Quay Lane corner.

The building contains one, two and three bedroom flats, with a large games area on the first floor, and a solarium to the second floor. The flats are located fronting Quay and Derby Streets to each level, with common areas fronting Quay Lane. The Derby Street driveway entrance leads through to a courtyard area which contains car parking and accesses a garage fronting Quay Lane. The courtyard is also entered via a corridor from the Quay Street entrance, which provides access to the main stair and flats. The courtyard is enclosed by early masonry walls containing evidence of original openings, which currently house metal framed casement windows to the upper levels. Large openings have been inserted into the ground floor walls for garage access, and other openings have been bricked-up. Cantilevered metal framed walkways and stair almost encircle the courtyard space, and provide fire escape and access to flats and common areas. The southeast end of the courtyard has a large covered area with latticed balustrading to each floor, and is surmounted by a boarded gable.

== Heritage listing ==
Walter Reid Court was listed on the Queensland Heritage Register on 21 October 1992 having satisfied the following criteria.

The place is important in demonstrating the evolution or pattern of Queensland's history.

Walter Reid Court reflects the high level of commercial development which occurred near the wharves on the Fitzroy River during the latter 19th century. The Walter Reid building stands as a legacy to the prominence of Rockhampton as a commercial city port during the late 19th and early 20th centuries. Together with the adjacent Walter Reid Community Arts Centre, the building is an integral member of a highly intact warehouse precinct.

The place demonstrates rare, uncommon or endangered aspects of Queensland's cultural heritage.

The building's exterior finish, of unpainted cement render, is a comparatively rare surviving example of a once common form of exterior architectural treatment.

The place is important because of its aesthetic significance.

Walter Reid Court, a three-storeyed former warehouse structure, has a considerable street presence due to its massive bulk, long street elevations and unpainted cement rendered facade. The building is recognised as a local landmark and makes a significant contribution to the Rockhampton streetscape and townscape. The building is of aesthetic merit, and the form, fabric and materials illustrate a skilled design approach.

The place has a strong or special association with a particular community or cultural group for social, cultural or spiritual reasons.

The building has special association for the people of Rockhampton as an historical landmark which contributes to the image of the city.

The place has a special association with the life or work of a particular person, group or organisation of importance in Queensland's history.

The building has special association with Walter Reid & Co, a longstanding Rockhampton based mercantile company which was important in Queensland economic history in the late 19th and early 20th centuries. It is also a significant example of the work of Brisbane architect Richard Gailey who was a prominent architect in Queensland from 1865 to 1924.
