= Beatrice Hutton =

Australian architect (1893–1990)

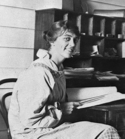
- Hutton c. 1916
- Born: Beatrice May Hutton; 16 July 1893; Lakes Creek, Queensland, Australia
- Died: 7 October 1990 (aged 97); Indooroopilly, Queensland, Australia
- Occupation: Architect

Beatrice May Hutton (16 July 1893 – 7 October 1990) was an Australian architect. On 30 October 1916, she became the first female to be accepted into an institute of architects in Australia. This followed the rejection of earlier female applicants, including Florence Taylor in 1907, on the grounds of being female.

== Life and work ==
Born 16 July 1893 at The Folly, Lakes Creek, central Queensland, Beatrice May Hutton was the second of seven children of a grazier and surveyor Falconer West Hutton and Clara Susannah, née Holt. Her early life was spent on the family property at Comet Down. Drought forced the family off the land in 1902 and they moved to Rockhampton in 1906 where she was educated at Rockhampton Girls Grammar School.

Beatrice Hutton did not undertake any formal architectural education, but began her training in Rockhampton firstly, in her father's surveying office. She initially wanted to pursue a career in surveying but had to "accept architecture as the nearest feasible alternative". Later, she was an articled pupil in Hocking and Palmer, the architectural office of Edwin Morton Hockings. She became the firm's chief draftsperson during Hockings' war service.

Hutton became the first woman admitted to an architectural institute in Australia, when she was accepted as a member of the Queensland Institute of Architects on 30 October 1916. The Sydney architectural journal The Salon announced:

"The Queensland Institute is, we believe, the first Australian Institute of Architecture to admit a lady member...The credentials placed before the Institute Council by the candidate showed that Miss Hutton was an earnest and industrious student, and the application was supported by her principals."

It is not yet clear what constituted her contribution to the work of Hockings and Palmer, however, several wide verandahed houses in Rockhampton have been attributed to Hutton's early career, such as the now heritage-listed Rudd Residence. Houses were Hutton's particular interest and like other early women architects, she felt that women had a significant role in designing houses that were suitable for the climate and that utilised labour saving features.

Her career progressed following her move to Sydney in late 1916, where her work focussed mainly on residential projects, as well as the New South Wales Masonic Club building (1927) and Sirius House in Macquarie Place. From April 1917 she worked for expatriate Queensland architect, Claude William Chambers, becoming a junior partner from 1931 to 1933. The firm was listed for those years as "Chambers and Hutton" in Sands New South Wales Directory, and it may be that Hutton was the only woman practising as a principal in Sydney at the time. She returned to Rockhampton in 1934 to care for her elderly parents, effectively ending her architectural career.

Hutton believed that women had a valuable contribution to make in the design of the residential realm, "in the design of homes suited to climate and equipped for modern living", and she is best known for her residential work, in Rockhampton and Sydney.

== Later life ==
In 1933, Hutton's career was cut short, due to her father's failing health, when she moved back to Rockhampton to care for him and her aging mother. After her father died, Hutton moved to Brisbane with her mother in 1936 and opened an art studio in the Colonial Mutual Life Building in Queen Street where she exhibited and sold her wood carvings. Judith Mackay wrote in 1984, when Hutton was 90, that "Beatrice Hutton currently lives surrounded by an impressive array of her own handwork in wood carving, pottery and rug-making. Her sustained enthusiasm for using her creative skills is inspirational. She exhibited and sold her work in a studio she opened with her mother, called 'The Glory Box', in Brisbane. In her later life, she continued to develop her craft work, with a brief return to architecture practice in 1940."

Hutton died on 7 October 1990 at Indooroopilly, Brisbane, and was cremated. She is commemorated by the Beatrice Hutton Award for Commercial Architecture, given by the Australian Institute of Architects Queensland Chapter, the Beatrice Hutton room in the Rockhampton Art Gallery, and the Beatrice Hutton House of Capricornia College, in Central Queensland University, Rockhampton.

== Projects ==
- J. W. Dalzell residence, Rockhampton (c. 1916)
- Myles House, Rockhampton (c. 1919)
- H Rudd house, Rockhampton (1923)
- 'Ngarita', Bellevue Hill, Sydney (1923)– attributed to architect James Vicars (Hutton's uncle's brother)
- Brecknell Street, Rockhampton (1926)
- NSW Masonic Club building (1927)
- Sirius House, Macquarie Place
