= Edwin Morton Hockings =

Australian architect (1870–1942)

Edwin Morton (Ted) Hockings (1870–1942) was an architect in Rockhampton, Queensland, Australia. A number of his buildings are now heritage listed.

== Early life ==
Edwin Morton Hockings was born in 1870, the son of Albert John Hockings (one of the early mayors of Brisbane) and his wife Elizabeth (née Bailey). Edwin Hockings was educated at Brisbane Grammar School.

== Architectural career ==
Hockings became the articled pupil of architect Richard Gailey. In 1890 Hockings won a design competition for the Rockhampton Girls Grammar School. Though Gailey's firm took over the final design work, Hockings departed to Rockhampton as the firm's clerk of works. In 1895 he was elected an Associate of the Queensland Institute of Architects, and thereafter commenced his own practice in Rockhampton from where he made his design mark throughout Central Queensland.

In addition to his responsibility for the main school building of the Rockhampton Girls Grammar School, Hockings was architect for the two major additions to it undertaken in 1897 and 1899, as well as a long serving member of the board of trustees (1908–1926), serving as board chairman in 1911 and from 1917 to 1919.

Hockings enlisted and served during the Boer War, where he commanded Squadron of the Third Queensland Contingent and was wounded. He and re-enlisted and served during the First World War.

Hockings formed a partnership with Alfred Mowbray Hutton from 1898 until 1904 (Hutton and Hockings, Architects and Building Surveyors). From 1913 to 1916, he accepted Beatrice May Hutton as his articled pupil. She would become the first female architect to be admitted to the Queensland Institute of Architects and also the first in Australia. He formed another partnership with Leslie Tarween Palmer from 1916 until 1938 (Hockings and Palmer). From 1939 to 1940, Hockings went on to form a final partnership with his son, Thomas Hocking (E.M. and T. Hockings/Hockings and Son). Edwin Morton Hockings survived to see the completion of his last major work, Rockhampton Town Hall.

== Later life ==
On 21 December 1942 Hockings died in Rockhampton, Queensland. He was cremated at the Mount Thompson Crematorium in Brisbane on 22 December 1942.

== Significant works ==
- Rockhampton Girls Grammar School (1890)
- St Peter's Church of England, Barcaldine (1898–99)
- C J Edwards Chambers, Rockhampton (1914)
- Rockhampton Town Hall (1939–41)
