= WH Paxton & Co. Buildings =

- Location within Queensland Location within Australia
- 21.1401°S 149.1903°E
- Location: 10 River Street, Mackay, Mackay Region, Queensland, Australia

Site notes
- Architect(s): Arthur Rigby; Montague Talbot Stanley

Queensland Heritage Register
- Official name: WH Paxton & Co. Offices and Warehouse (former)
- Type: state heritage (built)
- Designated: 14 August 2008
- Reference no.: 602554
- Significant period: 1890s, 1910s (fabric); 1890s–1980s (historical use)
- Builders: Charles Porter, Joseph Vidulich

The WH Paxton & Co. Buildings are a heritage-listed group of offices and warehousing at 10 River Street, Mackay, Mackay Region, Queensland, Australia. The 1899 sections were designed by Mackay architect Arthur Rigby and constructed by Charles Porter (office building) and Joseph Vidulich (warehouse). The 1912 warehouse extension was designed by Brisbane architect Montague Talbot Stanley. It was added to the Queensland Heritage Register on 14 August 2008.

== History ==
This former offices and warehouse, constructed in 1899 with c. 1912 additions, was built for wholesale merchants and shipping agents WH Paxton & Co, which from the late 1880s was a subsidiary of McIlwraith McEacharn & Co. The 1899 sections were designed by Mackay architect Arthur Rigby and constructed by Charles Porter (office building) and Joseph Vidulich (warehouse). The 1912 warehouse extension was designed by Brisbane architect Montague T Stanley.

Mackay was declared a port of entry and clearance in February 1863, following the opening of the Pioneer River district to pastoral settlement in 1862. Early activity centred on the south bank of the river, along River Street. Stores were constructed to receive wool from the hinterland and dray-loads of copper from Peak Downs. With the establishment of the sugar industry in the hinterland in the late 1860s local agitation for improved facilities at the river port resulted in the construction of a government wharf at River Street, Mackay, opened in September 1868.

Despite several inquiries and reports on the need for improved deepwater port facilities, activity associated with the successful operation of the port of Mackay remained centred on River Street until the mid-twentieth century. Wharves, warehouses, offices, ships' chandleries, boat builders, hotels and boarding houses created a busy precinct along the waterfront and at the northern ends of the streets feeding into River Street, such as Wood, Sydney, Brisbane, Carlyle and Tennyson streets.

Following the opening of the railway from Mackay inland along the Pioneer River valley in 1885, a much-used branch line was continued along River Street to service the port area. The new brick Mackay Customs House was constructed in 1901 in the centre of the riverfront precinct to replace the timber customs house built in the 1860s.

WH Paxton & Co was one of several large mercantile firms established in River Street to serve the shipping trade at the port of Mackay. These included Shepherd's Anvil Stores Pty Ltd (established 1873); James Croker & Sons (established 1889); J Michelmore & Co. (established 1891); and the offices of the Adelaide Steamship Company (erected in 1900).

William Henry Paxton came to Mackay in 1874 as manager for W Sloane & Co., a Victorian-based company with interests in a number of Mackay district sugar mills. By 1876 he had established WH Paxton & Co. as shipping, insurance, stock and station and general agents (including the agency for W Sloane and Co.) and wholesale merchants (including general hardware, wine and spirits, and produce). By 1886 the firm was trading in goods as diverse as plantation rice, flour, teas, maize, hessian bags, coal, tobacco, golden syrup, sugar and rum.

WH Paxton also held substantial mining interests, being a director of the Mount Orange Copper Mining Company, formed in 1877, and a shareholder in the Mount Britton Goldfield Company Limited, registered in 1882. He was mayor of Mackay in 1880. In 1883 he left Mackay for England and subsequently died in Melbourne in 1887.

Paxton had obtained the Mackay agency for the lucrative trade with the Australian-owned Australasian Steam Navigation Company (the ASN Co.). In 1887 the ASN Co. merged with the Queensland Steam Ship Company Ltd (the QSS Co.) as the largely British-owned Australasian United Steam Navigation Company (AUSN Co.), which became Australia's largest and most successful coastal shipping line. When news of his death reached Mackay in August 1887, flags over the AUSN Co.'s steamers in port were flown at half mast as a mark of respect.

Despite the early death of the firm's founder, WH Paxton & Co. continued to expand its operations in Mackay. By 1888 WH Paxton & Co. was also the Mackay agent for the British India and Queensland Agency (the BI & Q Agency), a subsidiary of the British India Steam Navigation Company (the BI Co.). The BI & Q Agency, registered in London but with the head office located in Brisbane, was formed in 1885 and had managed the merger of the ASN and QSS companies. Its principal proprietors were MacKinnon, McKenzie & Co. (British proprietors of the BI Co.), Gray, Dawes & Co. and McIlwraith McEacharn & Co. (based in Melbourne and London).

In August 1889 McIlwraith McEacharn & Co. of London, Antwerp and Melbourne, which had acquired the Rockhampton-based firm of Walter Reid & Co in 1881, purchased WH Paxton & Co. at Mackay. As in Rockhampton, where McIwraith McEacharn & Co. continued to operate under the name Walter Reid & Co., the firm continued to operate in Mackay as WH Paxton & Co.

McIlwraith McEacharn & Co. operated their own shipping interests between the United Kingdom and the Australia-Pacific zone in association with the BI & Q Agency, in which it held an interest, and the AUSN Co. The firm was significant in developing the frozen meat trade between Australia and Britain. Along with the Adelaide Steamship Company and Howard Smith, McIlwraith McEacharn & Co. and the AUSN Co. were significant pioneers of Australia's coastal shipping.

WH Paxton and Co.'s offices and warehouse were located near what is now 25 River Street until 1899 when new, larger, purpose-designed premises were constructed for the firm at 10 River Street, on a site acquired by the ASN Co. (later the AUSN Co.) in November 1865, and adjacent to what was by then the AUSN Co. wharf.

The new premises were designed by prominent local architect Arthur Rigby. The materials remained modest: timber-framed, with single-skin walls of corrugated iron or chamferboard. The two-storeyed section, constructed by local builder Charles Porter, was completed in August 1899. The attached single-storeyed warehouse, erected by Joseph Vidulich, was completed a little later.

The two-storeyed building contained storage space on the ground floor and offices (general and manager's) and sample room on the first floor. One of the features of the office building was the provision made for ventilation and light:

"The main office - 41 ft long and 31 ft wide, and 14ft from floor to ceiling - contains 15 windows, and is lined with pine suitably varnished. In the centre of the roof is a fret-work ventilator 25 ft long by 2ft 6 in wide, of elaborate design."

In June 1912 Brisbane architect Montague Talbot Stanley, son of former Queensland Colonial Architect FDG Stanley, called tenders for the erection of additions and alterations to WH Paxton & Co.'s premises in Mackay. This was likely when the double-gabled warehouse extension was constructed, and reflects the expansion of the company in the early decades of the twentieth century as the Queensland economy boomed.

Other warehouses, wharves and offices were built along River Street in the early years of the twentieth century, making River Street a hive of shipping and port activity. The Adelaide Steamship Company had constructed warehouses by 1900; J. Michelmore & Sons had erected their landmark warehouse and main office building in River Street, at the end of Sydney Street; and James Croker & Sons had constructed their own wharf by 1917.

In December 1914 McIlwraith McEacharn & Co. transferred title to 10 River Street to WH Paxton & Co. Ltd, likely in connection with wider corporate amalgamations in the Australian coastal shipping industry at this time. In 1914 the BI Co. combined with the Peninsula & Oriental Steam Navigation Co. (P&O) in one of the biggest shipping mergers in British history. Although the BI Co. initiated and retained the dominant interest in this merger, the combine traded under the P&O name. The subsidiary AUSN Co. retained its name but as a consequence of the merger, its management passed from the BI&Q Agency (in which McIlwraith McEacharn held a substantial interest) to MacDonald Hamilton & Company, P&O's Australian agents. At Mackay, however, WH Paxton & Co. remained the shipping agent for the AUSN Co. and also picked up the P&O line of steamers.

Between 1914 and 1946 P&O acquired more than a dozen shipping companies and by 1929 WH Paxton & Co. was the Mackay shipping agent for the AUSN Co., P&O Branch Service (via the Cape and Suez), the Eastern and Australian Steamship Co, and the Union Steamship Co. Ltd of New Zealand, as well as agent for the insurance company Lloyd's of London and sub-agent for Anglo Saxon Petroleum Co. Ltd.

"A Souvenir of Mackay and District" published in 1937 described WH Paxton & Co as one of the largest companies of its kind in Queensland, but the firm's connection with the shipping trade was about to decline. Throughout the 1920s and 1930s extensions to Queensland's railway network reduced the dependence of the Mackay region on sea transport. Furthermore, the opening of a Mackay deep-water harbour in 1939 changed the focus of port activity from the River Street wharves to the harbour and much of the riverside stores and infrastructure gradually became redundant. Until the late 1950s, however, River Street remained dominated by the long-established firms of Michelmore & Co; Shepherd's Anvil Stores; James Croker & Co and WH Paxton & Co.

As Australia's coastal shipping trade declined in the 1960s, McIlwraith McEacharn joined with the Adelaide Steamship Co. in 1964 to create Associated Steamships Pty Ltd. By the 1970s WH Paxton & Co was experiencing losses in its wholesale department due to changes in shopping practices from the 1950s and the shift from coastal shipping to rail and road transportation. By 1975 the firm had been wound down, and 10 River Street was sold by July 1980. The building remained in use by APG, a company dealing with curtains, blinds and similar household furnishings. During its occupation of the building the warehouse floor was cemented and the initials "APG" were painted on the roof of the office building.

In 1983 a new levee bank was constructed along River Street and the landmark J Michelmore & Co. warehouse was the first of the early shipping agency and wholesale importer premises to be demolished. Subsequently demolished structures included Shepherd's Anvil Stores Pty Ltd and James Croker & Sons' Victoria Wharf. Hotels along River Street, including the Prince of Wales, Leichhardt and the Crown and Anchor, were demolished more recently.

WH Paxton and Co.'s Offices and Warehouse survives as one of the few remaining places associated with the former shipping activity along River Street, which consolidated the importance of Mackay as a river port between 1863 and 1939. Other surviving buildings along the eastern end of River Street connected with former port activity include the Customs House (1901), the former Adelaide Steamship Company offices (1900) and Hossacks Store (formerly a ships' chandlery).

In 2016, the Paxton Natural Therapies Clinic operate from the premises.

== Description ==
The former WH Paxton & Co buildings comprises a number of attached timber structures located on the bank of the Pioneer River, fronting River Street. The northern ends of these structures are constructed on a timber-decked wharf jutting into the river, supported on concrete and timber piles driven into the mud. The place is visible from the river and from Forgan Bridge, and contributes to the historical streetscape along River Street.

The premises comprises three sections: at the western end of the site, a two-storeyed, timber-framed building (1899), originally designed as offices and sample room on the upper floor and as a store on the ground floor; an attached single-storey warehouse (c. 1899) on the east side of the office building; and a large volume, timber-framed warehouse extension (c. 1912), attached to the eastern end of the 1899 warehouse.

=== Offices, sample room and store (1899) ===
This two-storeyed, timber-framed building has a hipped roof clad with corrugated iron. All the exterior walls are clad with metal sheeting, some corrugated iron, but much of it later ribbed steel which appears to have replaced early corrugated iron.

On the upper level on the west and north sides of the building there is an open verandah, overlooking the Pioneer River to the north. This has a separate roof clad with corrugated iron, and supported in part on early bracketed timber posts. Part of the verandah on the western side of the building retains an early dowel balustrade. A flagpole is attached to this part of the verandah. The exterior wall of the upper floor, where sheltered by the verandah, is of exposed timber stud- framing, lined with chamferboards. Several timber-framed windows and timber French doors open onto the verandah from the first floor offices. Beneath the upper floor verandah the lower level, enclosed with corrugated iron sheeting by at least 1937, is now clad with later ribbed steel sheeting.

The entrance to the office building is at its south-west corner on River Street. It is marked by a timber batten arch and is accessed via a short timber stair. Just inside the entrance there is a timber staircase to the left. This is of two straight flights with a landing in the middle, and accesses the northern end of the upstairs verandah. There is a concrete strong-room or safe with a thick steel Chubb door near the front entrance, between the staircase and the exterior metal cladding.

The former store on the ground floor has been converted into offices with a suspended ceiling and modern fit-out.

The first floor area retains its early timber floorboards, interior partitioning, picture rails, and deep skirting boards. Early panelled timber doors and moulded timber architraves also exist throughout this level. The ceiling is lined with early, narrow, jointed timber boards.

=== Warehouse (c. 1899) ===
This single-storeyed, timber-framed structure with a hipped roof adjoins the east side of the two-storeyed building. Roof and walls are clad with metal sheeting, much of it later ribbed steel. It has the same early, closely boarded lining to the eaves as the office building.

A c. 1937 photographs shows a loading area under a wide cantilevered, skillion awning along the River Street frontage of the c. 1899 warehouse and part of the 1899 office building; however, no evidence of this awning and loading dock appears to survive.

=== Warehouse extension (c. 1912) ===
The warehouse extension at the western end of the site is attached to the c. 1899 warehouse. It occupies a large space and is fully enclosed with metal cladding except for doorways. It has a timber-framed double gable roof supported on stout stop-chamfered timber columns and trusses. The roof, like the exterior walls, is clad with later ribbed metal sheeting. The eaves are lined with widely spaced timber boards to assist with ventilation of the roof space.

The interior is unlined. The floors are timber but in sections have been covered with concrete; some of the timber flooring survives beneath the concrete.

Despite the internal alterations on the lower level of the two- storeyed section, and the later exterior cladding, the structure retains its early form and still demonstrates its early function as the offices, sample room, store and warehouse of a key Mackay shipping agency and general wholesaler at the turn of the nineteenth and twentieth centuries.

== Heritage listing ==
WH Paxton & Co buildings were listed on the Queensland Heritage Register on 14 August 2008 having satisfied the following criteria.

The place is important in demonstrating the evolution or pattern of Queensland's history.

Constructed in 1899 with c. 1912 additions, the former WH Paxton & Co buildings are significant for its association with Mackay as a major Queensland river port in the late nineteenth and early twentieth centuries. It demonstrates the pattern in Queensland's early settlement of establishing ports in sheltered rivers (for example, at Brisbane, Rockhampton, Mackay, Townsville, Ingham and Normanton), most of which were later replaced by deep water ports at the mouth of the river.

The place demonstrates rare, uncommon or endangered aspects of Queensland's cultural heritage.

The former WH Paxton & Co buildings are significant as one of few surviving structures (including Mackay Customs House, Mackay Customs House) illustrative of the relationship between the Pioneer River, the sea trade, and the prominence of Mackay as a city river port in Queensland from the 1860s to the 1950s.

Very few warehouses constructed on timber wharves survive in Queensland's former river ports, and the wharf structure may date to the 1860s (this has not been confirmed). The former WH Paxton and Co. Offices and Warehouse on its timber wharf on the Pioneer River is now a rare surviving example of a type of structure once common in Queensland.

The place is important in demonstrating the principal characteristics of a particular class of cultural places.

The former WH Paxton & Co buildings remains important in demonstrating many of the principal characteristics of a building designed to accommodate shipping offices and a wholesaling enterprise that combined warehousing, offices and display spaces within the one premises. The warehouse sections retain large interior volumes and well illustrate the use of heavy timber columns, bearers and trusses to support the roof. At the northern end the offices and warehouse spaces are constructed on a timber wharf over the Pioneer River, illustrating the close connection between the former shipping agency and Mackay's sea trade.

The place has a special association with the life or work of a particular person, group or organisation of importance in Queensland's history.

The place is significant for its long and special association with WH Paxton & Co, a longstanding Mackay-based mercantile company important in Queensland's economic history. Established in 1876, WH Paxton & Co. was associated with the place from 1899, when the structure was erected as purpose-built offices and warehouse for the company, until the firm's closure c. 1975.
