= Walter Reid & Co =

Retail business based in Australia

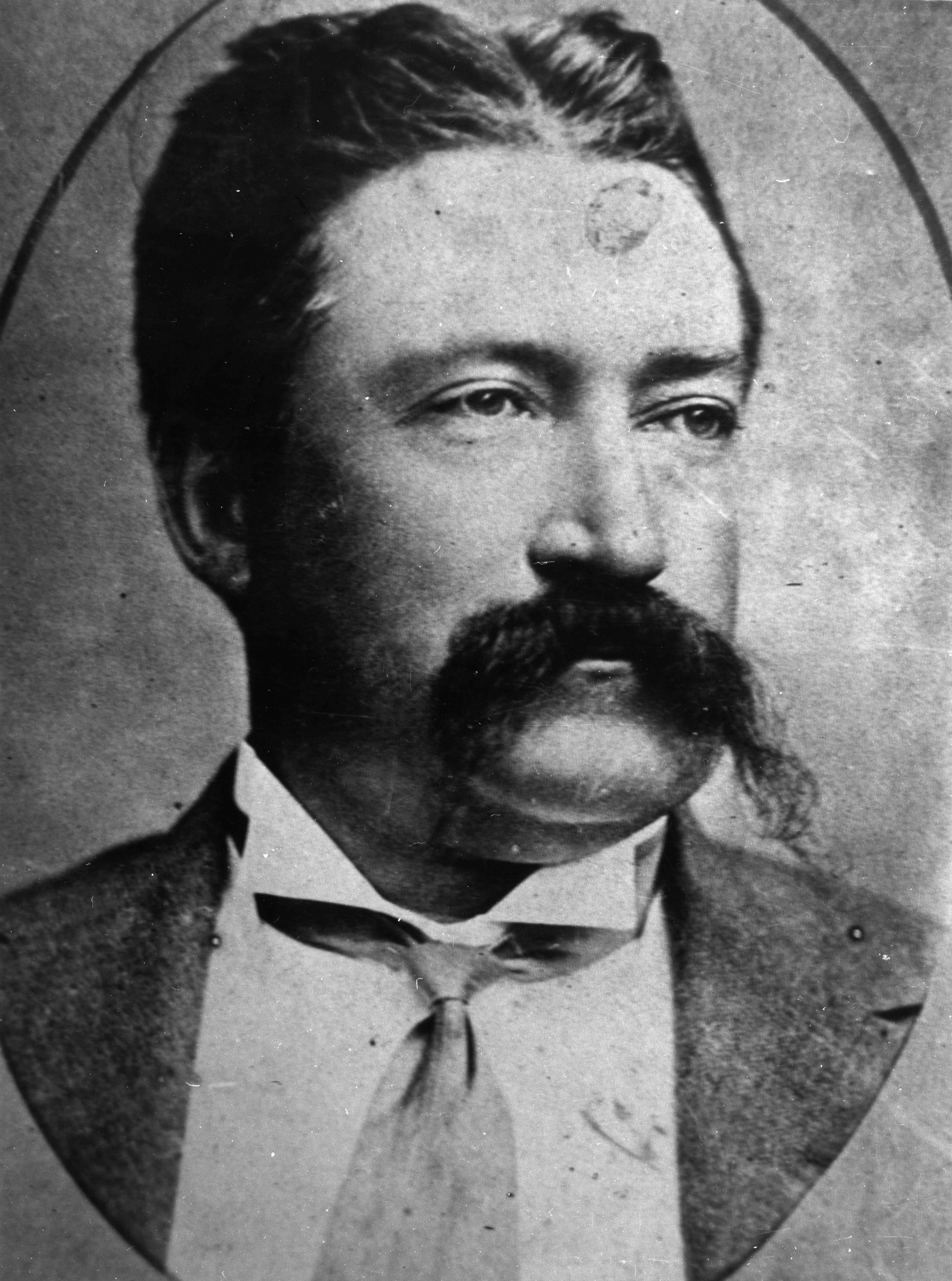
Walter Reid, merchant of Rockhampton

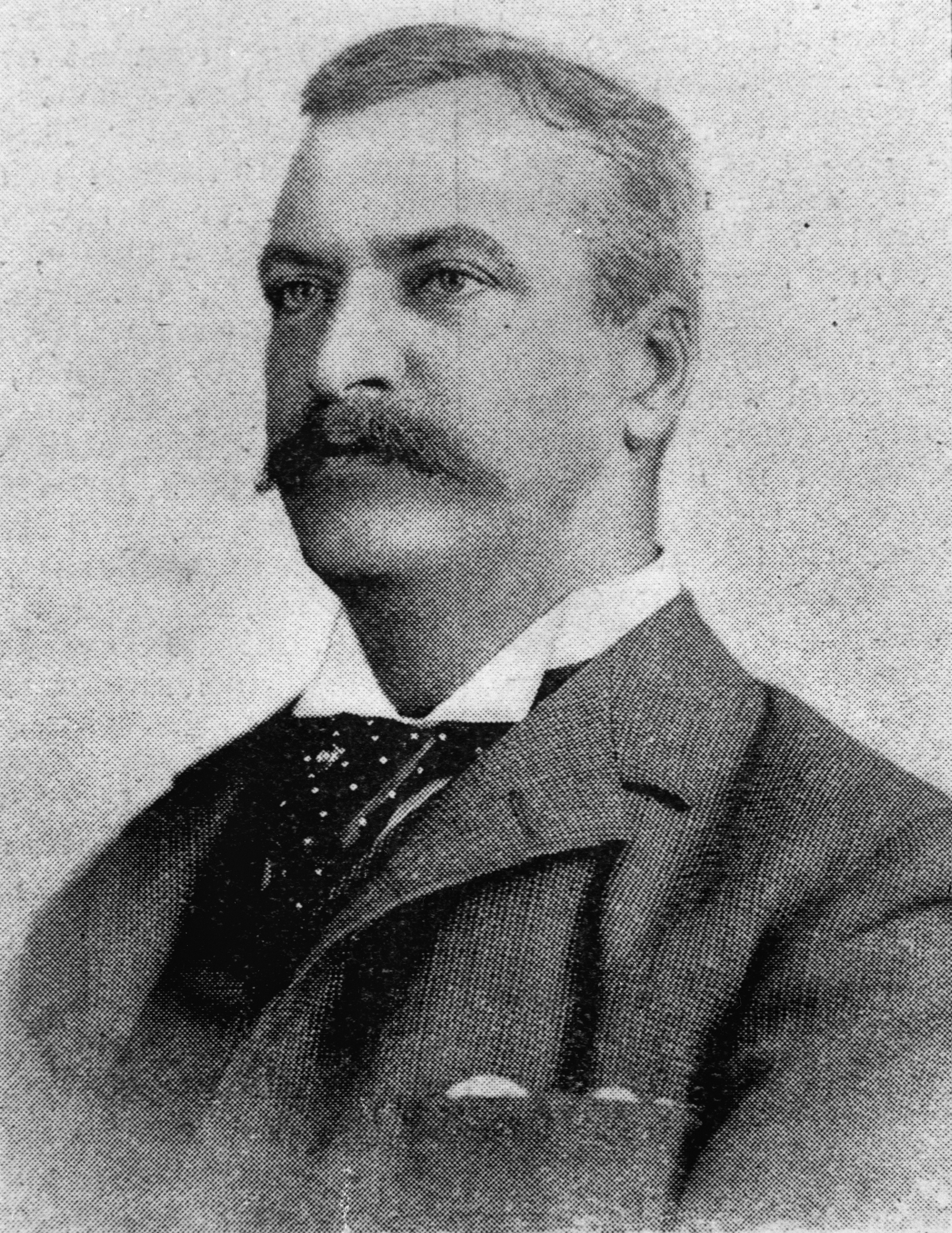
William Henry Rudd, general manager of Walter Reid & Co Ltd, Rockhampton, 1895

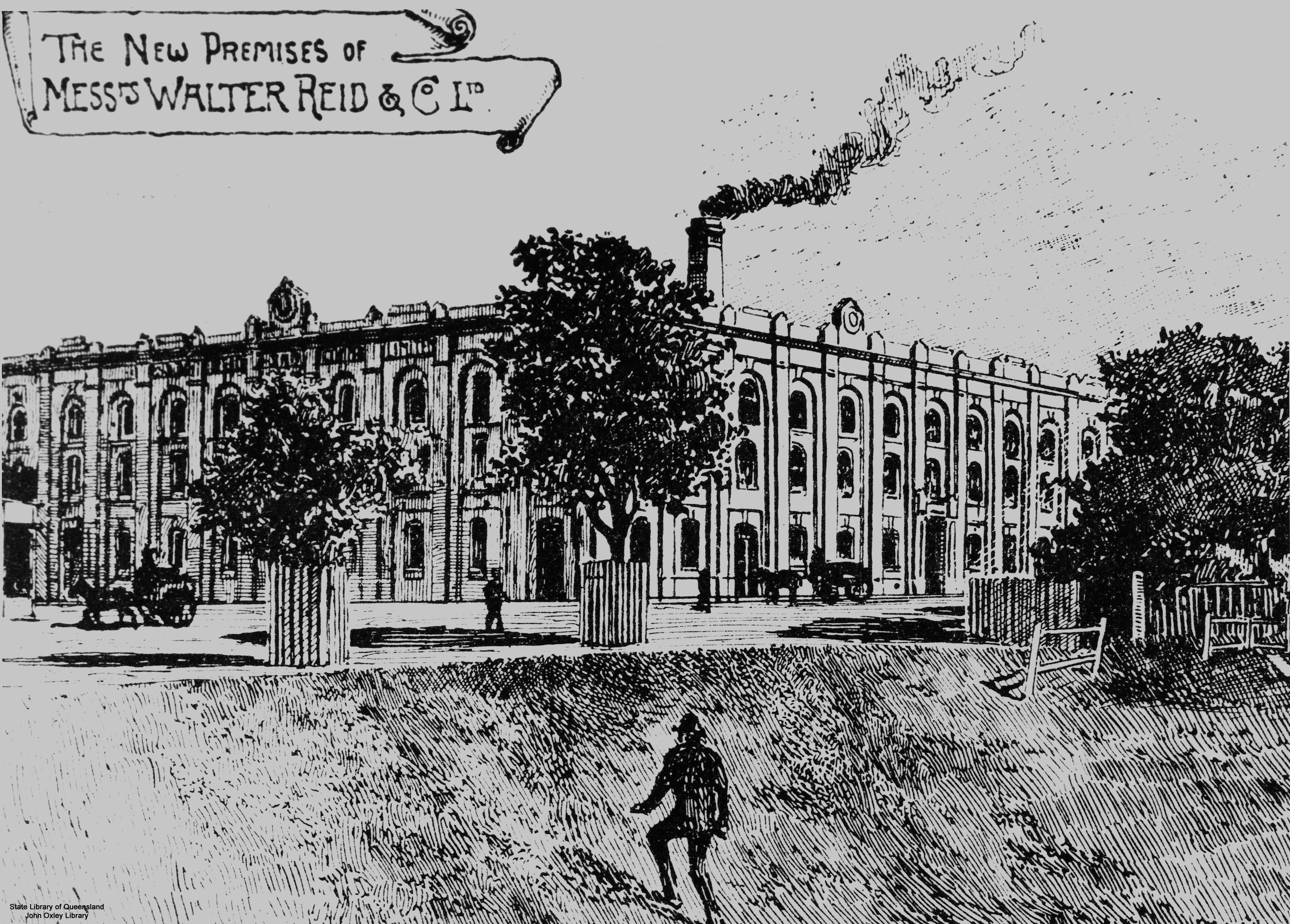
Walter Reid warehouse (now Walter Reid Court), 1894

Walter Reid & Co was a retail business based in Rockhampton, Queensland, Australia.

== History ==
Walter Reid settled in Rockhampton in 1862 to manage a southern-owned retail store in East Street which he subsequently bought in 1864, establishing Walter Reid & Co. He moved from his shop to new premises situated in Quay Street in 1868. It was in these new premises where Reid began to specialise as a wholesaler, trading in wine, spirits and general merchandise, supplying the hotels and stations in central Western Queensland. Since Rockhampton had been declared an official port in 1858, it had acted as the major transport and trade centre of central Queensland making it a prosperous city in which wholesale merchants like Reid could base their business.

Walter Reid's business prospered in the expanding colonial economy. With the establishment, in 1867, of the Central Western railway line which linked Rockhampton with the central western Queensland towns, Rockhampton's position as the most important port in the region was sealed. Reid diversified his interests, and ran lighters down the Fitzroy River to Keppel Bay where larger overseas ships unloaded their cargoes. The firm acted as a local agent for British-based companies and it was through this business connection that the British company McIlwraith & McEachearn bought Reid out in 1881.

The new owners continued to operate the business under the name of Walter Reid & Co. and during the 1880s the turnover was in the vicinity of £50,000 per annum. The firm acted as general merchants distributing groceries, ales, domestic and builders' hardware, farm produce, "fancy" goods, rural products, drugs, stationery, confectionery, and cigarettes. It also acted as importers and exporters, bondkeepers, storekeepers, produce dealers, shipowners, insurance, stock and station agents, financial agents and general commission agents.

The business was taken over by Ariadne in 1986.

== Notable buildings ==
A number of buildings of Walter Reid & Co are now heritage listed, including:

- Walter Reid Court, a warehouse now converted into apartments in Rockhampton
- Walter Reid Community Arts Centre, a warehouse now converted into an arts centre, Rockhampton
- Walter Reid Building facade, a warehouse now existing as a facade of a modern commercial building, Brisbane
