= St Peter's Anglican Church, Barcaldine =

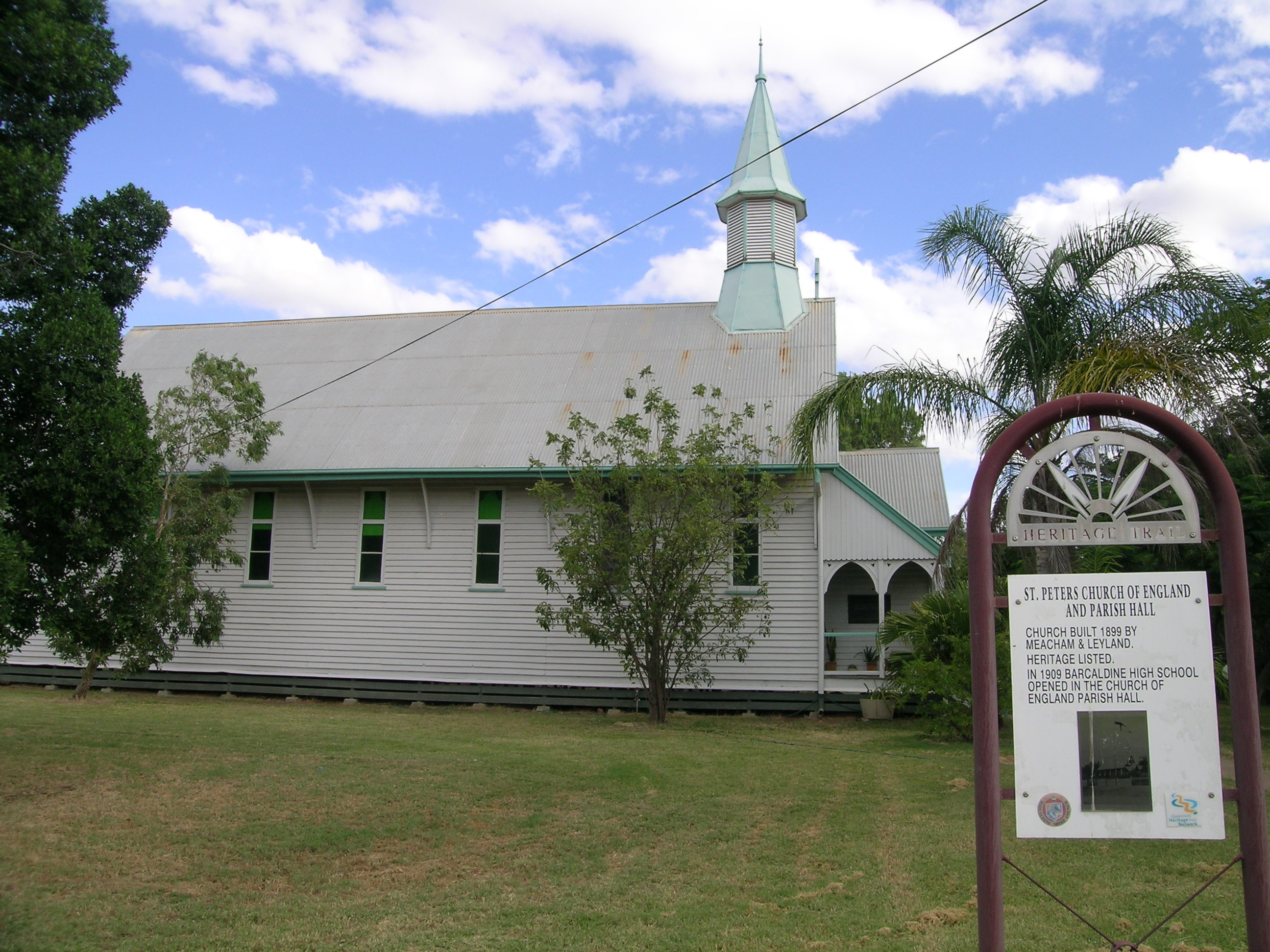
- St Peter's Anglican Church, 2010

- Location within Queensland Location within Australia
- 23.555°S 145.2873°E
- Location: 85 Elm Street, Barcaldine, Barcaldine Region, Queensland, Australia

History
- Design period: 1870s–1890s (late 19th century)
- Built: 1899

Site notes
- Architect: Edwin Hockings

Queensland Heritage Register
- Official name: St Peter's Anglican Church and Hall
- Type: state heritage (built)
- Designated: 21 October 1992
- Reference no.: 600022
- Significant period: 1899–1913 (fabric); 1899–1913, 1914–1990, 1964–1969 (historical)
- Significant components: tower – bell / belfry, memorial – window, hall, furniture/fittings, church, stained glass window/s
- Builders: Messrs. Meacham and Leyland

St Peter's Anglican Church and Hall is a heritage-listed church at 85 Elm Street, Barcaldine, Barcaldine Region, Queensland, Australia. It was designed by Edwin Hockings and built in 1899. It was added to the Queensland Heritage Register on 21 October 1992.

== History ==
St Peter's Anglican Church is a substantial timber church located prominently in Barcaldine and was dedicated on 28 October 1899.

Barcaldine was established in 1886 with the arrival of the railway, although the area had previously been settled as a pastoral district centred on Blackall. For three years Barcaldine was the railhead, bringing a large number of workers, carriers and businesses to the town. Although two blocks of land between Yew and Elm Streets were shown as church land on the first town plan, there was no church built and in 1892 the whole district was still under the care of a single priest living at Blackall. A mission was opened in 1893 based on Longreach and the priest from this or from Springsure visited Barcaldine from time to time, using local halls for worship or visiting stations in the area. Because of the difficulty of finding priests to serve in areas away from major towns, religion had little place in everyday life.

The Brotherhood of St Andrew, known as the Bush Brothers, was established by the first Bishop of Rockhampton, Nathaniel Dawes, to address the problem of supplying pastoral care to a huge, sparsely settled and poor diocese. In 1897 he attended a conference in London for bishops serving abroad. Since 1883 a "mission" scheme had operated in Bethnal Green, a poor part of London, and he thought of adapting this idea for Queensland. St Andrew's Mission House was set up as a base in Longreach to provide practical and spiritual support for the Brothers who travelled where they were needed and remained unmarried during their term of service. Their first charges were the towns of Aramac, Ilfracombe and Barcaldine. Some well-known Brothers served the area including the famous "fighting parson" Rev. Frederick Hulton-Sams, known for his boxing skills. He was killed in France in 1915 when taking water to the wounded. His friends wrote a book about his experiences as a bush brother. A memorial to Sams and to Guy Roxby, who died in 1913 from typhoid (the first brother to die in service), are in St Peter's church.

At first, services at Barcaldine were held in the court house. In 1898 a handsome bequest from England, known as the Marriott bequest, contributed £250 to the cost of a church and a committee was formed to begin the work. Plans were drawn up with input from Archdeacon George Halford, by Edwin Hockings of Rockhampton who had also designed the Mission House at Longreach. The cost of construction escalated as a severe fire in Longreach in October 1898 raised the demand for labour and materials. Work began in mid 1899 and the contractors for the building were Messrs. Meacham and Leyland of Barcaldine. St Peters was dedicated on 28 October 1899, the feast of St Simon and St Jude, although the building was not quite finished. To reduce costs, the church was built in two stages. The first stage included sanctuary, chancel and a short nave. An unusual feature is the open rood screen, uncommon in Queensland churches and believed to be the only one in western part of Queensland.

A number of the furnishings for the new church came out from England including a lectern copied from that in Exeter Cathedral. The font was a gift of the children of Archdeacon Halford's old parish of St Peter, Jarrow-on-Tyne in England. Halford became the Bishop of Rockhampton in 1901 and was the first bishop consecrated in Queensland. The church was served by Brothers who travelled from Longreach and spent a month at a time in Barcaldine, living in the vestry and eating at the hotel.

A parish hall had been built by 1909 although church records do not record the exact date of construction. It was used between 1909 and 1911 for the privately operated Barcaldine High School, the first secondary school in western Queensland and one which catered for both boys and girls. While the venture did not last, it was succeeded by the Barcaldine Grammar School in 1915, which was run by the Church and which also used the hall for classes. The school closed in 1918 for want of a teacher, but the ideal of a church school to serve the western districts was not abandoned. In 1922, St Peter's School opened with boarding facilities for both boys and girls and an extra classroom built beside the hall. Its peak enrolment of 62 children was reached in 1923 and the school struggled financially during the hard years of the twenties finally closing in 1932. The buildings constructed for it were used during World War II for girls evacuated from St Faith's, Yeppoon, but the buildings have not survived.

In 1913 the church was completed by extending the nave and adding a baptistery, porch and turret. At this time the church was also painted, improvements were made to the pulpit and a stained glass window was placed in the baptistery. The extension cost £400 and Meacham and Dryer were the contractors.

It was considered that the pastoral care provided by the Brothers was preparatory to the formation of a parish and in 1914 Barcaldine became a parish in its own right.

St Peter's church has associations with many local families who raised money, acted as Sunday School teachers, helped to organise events and participated in them as well as attending services. Particularly in the era before modern transport and communication made social contact easier, the church provided a social as well as a spiritual focus for its congregation and had a number of clubs to cater for different ages and interests. Events such as balls, picnics, bazaars and an annual flower show were well supported. Schemes to sustain church finances even included the purchase of cattle which were given the church registered brand and then raised on various stations in the area before being sold. An Anglican Far Western Mission was run from St Peters from 1964–1969 by Rev. Frank Neubecker who was able to visit outlying places for one week a month by flying in a light plane, named the Saint Michael.

Numbers of communicants began to fall in the 1980s, exacerbated by a downturn in the rural economy. In 1990 the church could no longer afford a parish priest and the Archdeacon came over from Longreach to hold services on a monthly basis. Worship is now led by lay preachers. Changes to the church have been minimal. A new porch and entry was constructed in 1961 and a new rectory was built in 1977.

== Description ==
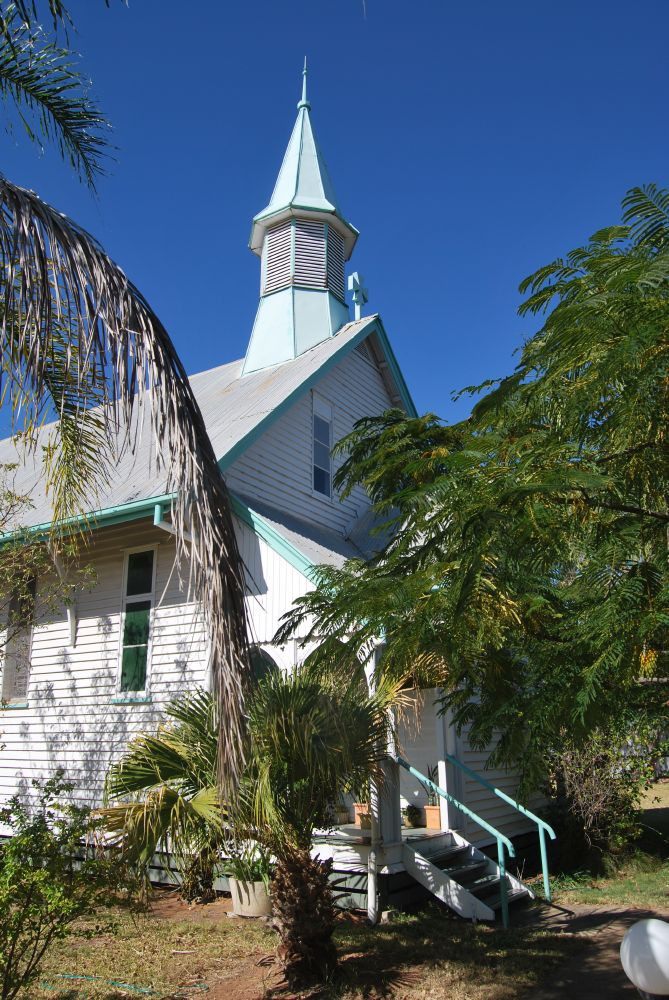
Church entrance, 2010

St Peter's Anglican Church is located on the southern side of Elm Street and is parallel to the road, running on an east-west axis. It is a timber building, rectangular in plan with an apsidal sanctuary at the eastern end. To the western end is a baptistery flanked by small porches. It has a steeply pitched gable roof clad with corrugated iron which extends to cover the vestry on the southern side. The roof is crowned with an octagonal louvred turret and spire and the eaves are supported by curved timber brackets. The external walls are clad in narrow weatherboards. There is a bell tower at the south east corner between vestry and sanctuary.

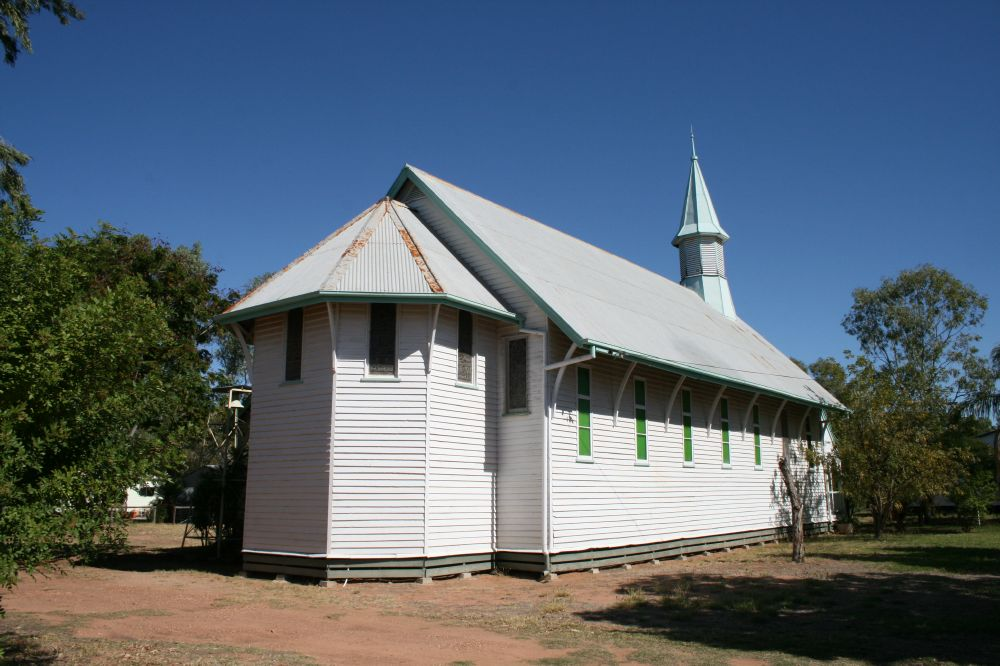
Rear view, 2015

The internal walls of the church are lined with painted tongue and groove boards and the roof is ceiled with "caneite". The flooring is 1?" wide tongue and groove hardwood. Separating chancel and nave is an open timber rood screen composed of six timber posts supporting the rail and rood and linked by Gothic tracery. The posts are decorated with shields bearing heraldic devices.

Windows to the side walls are narrow and rectangular. There are a number of stained glass memorial windows including five above the altar depicting the Ascension and scenes from the life of St Peter installed in 1918, a Resurrection from 1918 and that in the baptistery donated in 1913. The fittings are original and include a stone font inscribed " An offering to the Glory of God from the children of the church of St Peter, Jarrow to the church of St Peter, Barcaldine". The lectern is a copy of that in Exeter Cathedral and was carved and donated by Mr G. Lloyd-Jones of Ilfracombe in England. The richly embroidered altar frontal dating from the 1900s was also an English gift.

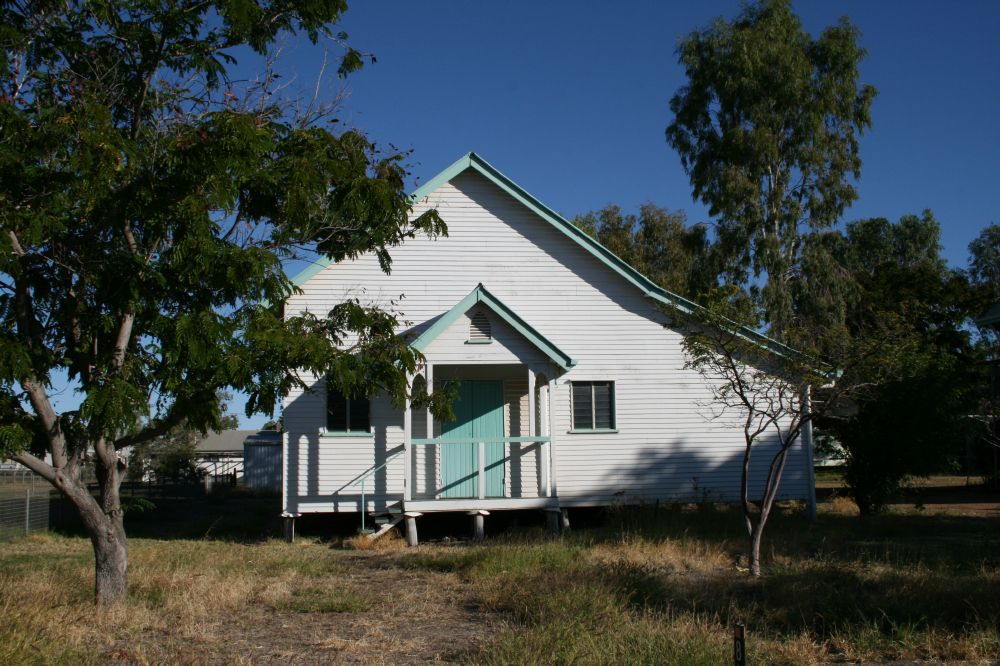

The hall is located a short distance from the eastern end of the church and at right angles to it. It is a rectangular timber framed building clad in fibre-cement sheeting with a weatherboard pattern and with a corrugated iron roof. The western side has been extended by a lean-to and the original double hung windows have been replaced with louvres. The double timber doors of the entrance facing Elm Street are sheltered by a gabled porch. This building has narrow timber floor boards and a caneite ceiling similar to those in the church and the wall between the hall proper and the extension has exposed studs.

== Heritage listing ==
St Peter's Anglican Church and Hall was listed on the Queensland Heritage Register on 21 October 1992 having satisfied the following criteria.

The place is important in demonstrating the evolution or pattern of Queensland's history.

St Peter's church and hall, which was also the venue for the first secondary school in western Queensland, illustrate the growth of Barcaldine and the way in which communities in the west worked to build and sustain places of worship.

The place demonstrates rare, uncommon or endangered aspects of Queensland's cultural heritage.

The rood screen in St Peter's church which separates nave from chancel is thought to be the only screen of its type in western Queensland.

The place is important in demonstrating the principal characteristics of a particular class of cultural places.

St Peter's Church demonstrates the principal characteristics of a regional timber Gothic Revival church and retains its original furniture and fittings. The hall is also a characteristic example of a timber church hall of its era.

The place is important because of its aesthetic significance.

St Peter's Church has aesthetic significance as a picturesque Gothic church on a prominent town site.

The place has a strong or special association with a particular community or cultural group for social, cultural or spiritual reasons.

St Peter's Church and hall have a strong association with the people of Barcaldine and the surrounding area for spiritual and cultural reasons having provided pastoral care and developed social contacts in the region for over a hundred years.

The place has a special association with the life or work of a particular person, group or organisation of importance in Queensland's history.

As one of the earliest charges of the Bush Brotherhood, St Peter's church has a special association with the life and works of many members of that important institution.
