= Hockings and Palmer =

Australian architectural partnership

Hockings and Palmer was an architectural partnership of Edwin Morton (Ted) Hockings and Leslie Tarween Palmer from 1916 until 1938. Their business was based in Rockhampton, Queensland, Australia. Some of their works are now heritage-listed.

== Significant works ==
- Medical Superintendent's Residence and Therapies Block at the Rockhampton Hospital
- Rockhampton War Memorial
