= Hutton & Hockings =

Architecture firm in Rockhampton, Queensland, Australia

Hutton & Hockings was an architectural firm in Rockhampton, Queensland, Australia. Some of their works are now heritage-listed.

== History ==
Two architects, Alfred Mowbray Hutton and Edwin Morton Hockings formed a partnership from 1898 until 1904, known as Hutton and Hockings, Architects and Building Surveyors.

== Significant works ==
Significant works of Hutton & Hockings include:

- Walter Reid Community Arts Centre (a warehouse for Walter Reid & Co, now a community arts centre)
