= Rockhampton Girls Grammar School =

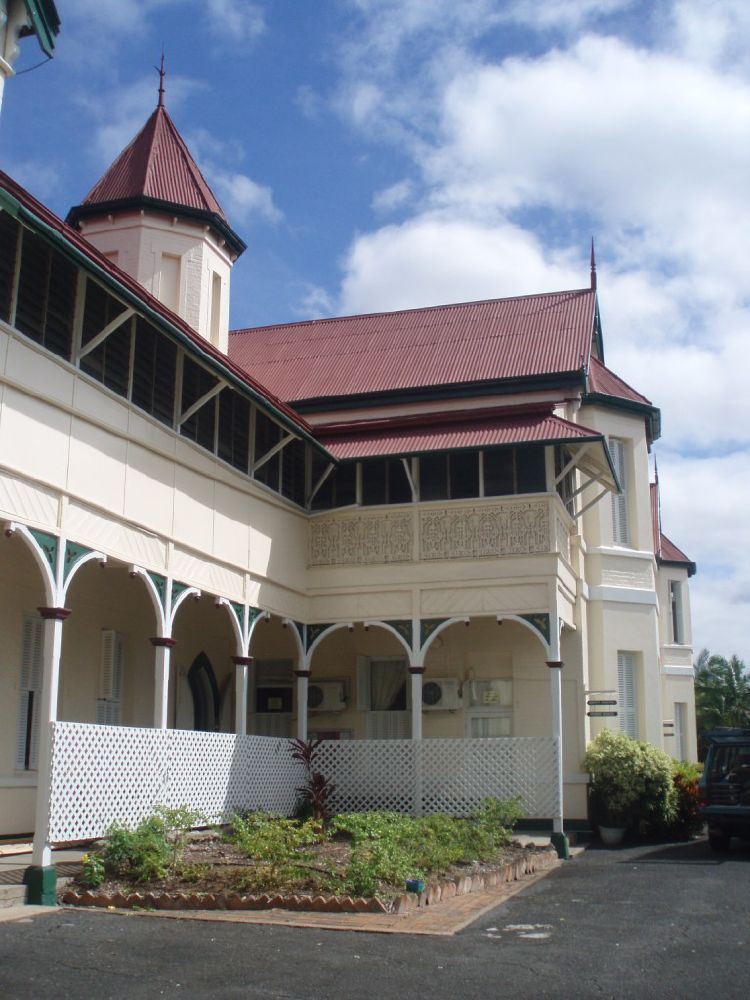
- Rockhampton Girls Grammar School, Paterson House, 2009

- Location within Queensland Location within Australia
- 23.3883°S 150.496°E
- Location: 155 Agnes Street, The Range, Rockhampton, Rockhampton Region, Queensland, Australia

History
- Design period: 1870s–1890s (late 19th century)
- Built: 1890

Site notes
- Architect: Edwin Morton Hockings
- Architectural style: Gothic

Queensland Heritage Register
- Official name: Rockhampton Girls Grammar School
- Type: state heritage (built, landscape)
- Designated: 20 October 2000
- Reference no.: 600780
- Significant period: 1890s–1900s (fabric); 1870s (historical)
- Significant components: school/school room, garden/grounds
- Builders: Moir Cousins and Co

Rockhampton Girls Grammar School is a heritage-listed private school at 155 Agnes Street, The Range, Rockhampton, Rockhampton Region, Queensland, Australia. It was designed by Edwin Morton Hockings and built in 1890 by Moir Cousins and Co. It was added to the Queensland Heritage Register on 20 October 2000.

== History ==
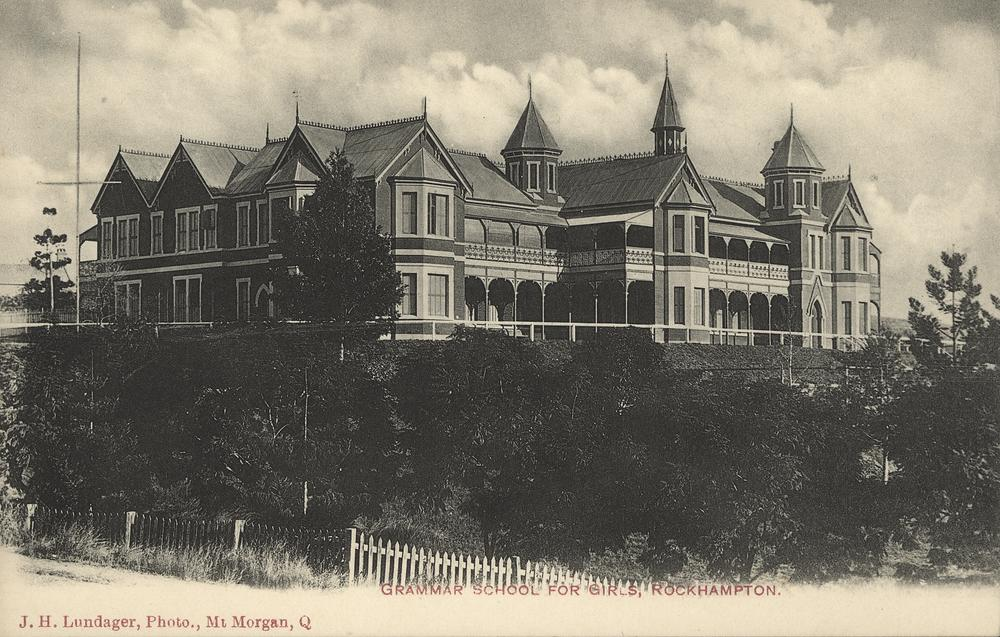
Rockhampton Girls' Grammar School, circa 1895

The Rockhampton Girls Grammar School opened on 19 April 1892. There was no ceremony to mark the occasion due to the serious illness of George Barnsley Shaw, who had been very active in the establishment of the school; Shaw died on 20 April 1892. The first headmistress was Helen Downs. It was the ninth of the grammar schools to be established in Queensland and the third grammar school for girls. As with the other grammar schools, it was constituted under the Grammar Schools Act of 1860, one of the first pieces of legislation passed by the Queensland Parliament, which encouraged by way of grants of land and subsidies, the establishment of non government secular schools for secondary education within the colony. As Queensland was not establishing state high schools until the 1910s, nor the principal of universal secondary education until the 1960s, the state-assisted (albeit independent) grammar schools represented the de facto state secondary school system.

From its establishment in 1881, the Rockhampton Grammar School (located nearby on the Athelstane Range overlooking Rockhampton) had included both a boys and a (smaller) girls department. The Government, however, refused to recognise the separate departments as entitled to separate subsidies under the Act, and as a consequence the Trustees soon insisted on a separate grammar school for girls. In 1886 the Girls Department was closed. The issue of education for women continued to be raised in the press, although, it was not until 1890 that sufficient funds were raised (via private and government subsidies) to proceed with the founding of the new school. In that year, competitive designs were called for a building suitable for a Girls Grammar School, providing residence accommodation for Headmistress and Staff, 20 Boarders, also School accommodation for 50 Scholars, with necessary classrooms etc. The building was to be of brick with the total cost not to exceed £4,000. Thirty-two entries were received with first prize awarded to Edwin Morton Hockings of Brisbane and second to James Flint of Rockhampton. Brisbane architect, Richard Gailey, objected however to the awarding of the prize to Hockings on the grounds that the plans were prepared while Hockings was articled to Gailey as his pupil. At Gailey's request, the first prize was recorded as his, with Hockings appointed clerk of works.

Edwin Morton Hockings (1870–1942) was to have a long association with the school. In addition to his responsibility for the main school building, he was architect for the two major additions to it undertaken in 1897 and 1899, as well as a long serving member of the Board of Trustees (1908–1926), serving as Board Chairman in 1911 and from 1917–19. In 1895, Hockings became an Associate to the Queensland Institute of Architects, and from that year is recorded as practicing as an architect in Rockhampton. He was to practice in partnership with AM Hutton (1899–1907), LT Palmer (1916–1938), and for a short time, with his son, Thomas.

In 1890, the tender for the erection of the new school of £3,890 by Moir Cousins and Co was accepted. Prior to construction, the plan of the building was reversed, apparently as the extent of levelling to Denham Street was not sufficient to allow for the positioning according to the original plans. Delays in completion were apparently caused by repeated alterations to the building specification, including increased ventilation and the fitting of forty-four cedar venetian shutters.

The new two-storeyed brick building (known since 1971 as Paterson House, after Chairman of Trustees 1920–52, AH Paterson) was described by the local press as late nineteenth century, in keeping with the usual Australian Architect's interpretation of Gothic. On the ground floor were an assembly hall, two classrooms, drawing room, dining room, mistress's dining room and kitchen. The upper floor (accessed by three staircases, one each for pupils, mistresses and servants) housed two music rooms, two dormitories, three bedrooms for mistresses, servant's bedrooms, and bathrooms. The total cost was £5,666.5.3. The grounds were rough with only the school area and tennis court levelled.

In 1892, a timber caretaker's cottage (£180) and playshed (£162), designed and supervised by Rockhampton architect and competition runner up, James Flint, were erected. In the following year, the playshed was fitted as a gymnasium.

On Arbor Day, soon after the school's opening, forty-six trees, one for each pupil, mistress and Trustee present, were planted. These included, on advice from the Curator of the Rockhampton Botanic Gardens (JS Edgar), 12 mango trees planted on the town edge of the lawn tennis court, silky oaks, jacarandas, and bunya pines. In 1894 the orange trees planted above the tennis court were replaced by Araucaria cunninghamii (hoop pine). By the end of 1894 planting was curtailed.

In the next decade, as the school expanded, three major additions were made to the school building. In 1897, a new single storeyed wing, designed by EM Hockings and built by R Cousins & Co, was added to the southern side of the building. The work costing £1,392.3.7. included a new Assembly Hall, two classrooms, and an office for the Headmistress. As a result, the old assembly hall was formed into two classrooms (one being for cookery and chemistry). The excavated material from the site of the additions was used to form "the Terrace" in front of the school.

Further additions, again undertaken by Hockings (now Hutton and Hockings) and R Cousins and Co, were carried out in 1899. The two storeyed wing to the south east of the building included new dormitories and bathrooms to accommodate eighteen boarders, two new classrooms, and music rooms. The work completed in 1900 at a total cost of £2,019.10.0. also included extensions to the Assembly Hall and two of the existing classrooms, the demolition of the headmistress's office, and the excavation and completion of two new tennis courts.

The third stage costing £978 was undertaken in 1901. It included the incorporation of a classroom with the dining room, construction of two new upstairs classrooms, new staircase to the southwest, new laundry, housemaid's pantry, storeroom, bathroom, and servants bedroom.

Other improvements undertaken by this time included fencing, excavation, erection of parapet retaining wall, terracing, driveway and asphalting, gates, window shutters, a 2,000 gallon water tank, and painting of brickwork with red-oxide paint (apparently in the hope of combating the effect of rising damp).

In 1898, Miss Downs established the kindergarten for younger students. This was housed in the school room at the rear of main building, and from 1908 in the "detached residence" (erected 1899 as an isolation room for sick students). This was finally closed during World War II.

The initial "boom" period of the school could not however be sustained. For example, the establishment in 1919 of a state high school as part of the Rockhampton Technical School and later the depression (and a decrease in government endowments) saw a decrease in enrolments. In 1945 additions were made by school architect Arthur Edward Hegvold to the upper storey of Paterson House. These included a staffroom, bathrooms, sickbay, and glassed in verandah. About this time the gymnasium was converted into a music building containing five practice rooms (later increased to eight), but it was not until the 1960s that further major development was to occur.

The opening of Luck House (containing boarding accommodation and classrooms) in 1962 was the first major building to be erected on the site after the main school building. It signalled the beginning of a substantial building program, as the school sought to deal with increasing enrolments and changing educational requirements. Later buildings include the Science Laboratory and Clarice McKeague Hall (1968), Principal's residence (1971), Colin H Grant Library and Resources Centre (1972), Millicent Jackson House (1977), Music Centre (1986), Primmer House (1987) – located on the terrace on the site of one of the original tennis courts, and Centenary Arts Building (1991).

Works were also carried out to Paterson House as it too adapted to changing requirements with teaching removed to other parts of the school. Work included the removal of cubicles in the dormitories (1978); alterations to dining room, kitchen, and laundry, renovation of a dormitory and a new sick bay (1983). In 1987, the Trustees instituted a long range project for the continuing refurbishment of Paterson House including work to dormitories and the balcony facing Denham St. The building currently houses facilities for boarding and administration.

From 1978, a program of landscaping the grounds was instigated, including the paving and planting by senior students of trees on the north terrace called "The Mall"; students' mural of Jackson House courtyard; planting of "Gallipoli Pines" near the swimming pool; planting of the Bicentennial Grove on land adjacent to the school boundary on the north and east.

== Description ==
Rockhampton Girls Grammar School, situated to the southwest of the city centre, is located near the crest of the Athelstane Range on a northeasterly slope. The main building, Paterson House, displays a strong gothic influence in its design and is located to the south of the site, with terracing to the northeast on which are located sporting facilities and school buildings.

Paterson House is a two-storeyed painted masonry building with a complex corrugated iron roof consisting of intersecting gables with turrets and hipped bays. The building was built in a number of stages extending to the south, and the brickwork patterns include English, English Garden Wall, Flemish and Stretcher Bonds. Some verandahs and courtyard spaces have been enclosed.

The northeast elevation consists of three projecting bays with verandahs in between. The southern section is setback and has an L-shaped verandah with a fire stair and a turret above the inside corner. A second turret is located near the northern corner above the pointed arch main entry, and the building has concrete mouldings expressing floor levels and wall openings. Verandahs have arched timber brackets with a diagonally boarded timber frieze to the ground floor, with the first floor being enclosed with fibrous cement sheeting and glass louvres. Some cast iron balustrading is visible, with possibly more concealed behind sheeting. The narrow timber casement windows have hopper panels above and timber shutters.

The southeast elevation, fronting the driveway, consists of a slightly proud twin gable southern section with a wide central arch and two flanking narrow arches, housing recessed windows, on the ground floor. The central arch has the words AH PATERSON DRIVE above. The eastern section has a projecting bay, and the southern corner has a reconstructed open verandah with cast aluminium balustrading.

The southwest elevation, fronting Agnes Street, consists of two gable sections with the area between enclosed at ground level and housing kitchen and laundry facilities. To the south of this, and slightly recessed, is the Assembly Hall end elevation, which has a gable parapet with a rounded apex and a series of tall casement windows, the central one of which has an arched fanlight, with timber shutters. Stepping back from this element is the reconstructed open verandah.

The northwest elevation, accessed by a driveway from Agnes Street which also separates more recent school buildings to the northwest, has a mid twin gable section and an enclosed verandah with exposed cast iron balustrading to the northern end. The western end has service areas for the kitchen and laundry. Some timber sash windows have window hoods with decorative timber brackets.

Internally, the ground floor contains administration offices to the northeast and southeast. These include the Headmaster and secretary's offices, foyer and stair in the northern corner, which have stained timber fireplace surrounds, staircase and panelling, panelled doors with fanlights, architraves and skirtings. The kitchen and laundry areas to the west have been refurbished and refitted, as have the administration areas to the southeast. The Assembly Hall has arched timber trusses with a boarded ceiling at the collar-beam position and raked to the side walls. The hall has a triple lancet window in the northeast wall, which is now an internal wall to administration rooms beyond.

The first floor consists of dormitories with nurse's rooms in the northern area. The dormitories and bathrooms have been altered a number of times, with verandahs and courtyard spaces being enclosed. The most recent alterations have been to the southern dormitories and include new partitioning, fittings and finishes.

The building is accessed from the southeast via a driveway from the corner of Denham and Agnes Streets, which has a cast iron gate and brick piers. This is lined with Pine trees, with many more scattered about the grounds, particularly to the east of Paterson House and fronting Denham Street. A wide pathway leads around the northeast of the building, from which the land terraces to an asphalt tennis court, with brick retaining wall and concrete ramp, to the east, and Primmer House to the northeast. A paved terrace area is located to the north, opening off the dining and kitchen areas. The southwest is bounded by an embankment to Agnes Street above.

Located below the tennis court terrace is the netball court, with the music building forming the northwest boundary. This building, originally the open sided gymnasium, has a corrugated iron gambrel roof supported on square timber posts with a concrete floor. The building has been enclosed with fibrous cement sheeting and glass louvres. A ceiling has been installed and internal partitioning has formed a series of music practice rooms and a larger central space.

The recently constructed Centenary Art building forms the northeast boundary to the netball court, with a greenhouse to the southeast.

== Heritage listing ==
Rockhampton Girls Grammar School was listed on the Queensland Heritage Register on 20 October 2000 having satisfied the following criteria.

The place is important in demonstrating the evolution or pattern of Queensland's history.

The Rockhampton Girls Grammar School is one of a number of grammar schools established in major Queensland cities from the mid to late 19th century. In Queensland, where the colony's (and later State's) educational emphasis was placed on universal primary education, the state assisted (albeit independent) grammar schools represent the historical beginnings of the state secondary school system. Opened in 1892 at a time when Rockhampton was securing its place as the major central Queensland city, the Rockhampton Girls Grammar School (the third grammar school in Queensland established for girls) is also part of a wider tradition which recognised the important of education for women.

The place is important in demonstrating the principal characteristics of a particular class of cultural places.

Paterson House, erected in 1891 (with several later additions) is the original school building and remained the only major school building until the 1960s. Designed by prominent Rockhampton architect EM Hockings, it is recognised by the school community as the symbolic heart of the school. In common with a number of educational buildings of the period, Paterson House employs the Collegiate Gothic architectural vocabulary to exemplify the pedagogical culture of the school. It is the principal member of an intact group of early terraced school facilities including the former gymnasium, tennis court and netball court.

The place is important because of its aesthetic significance.

The school, surrounded by mature pine trees, is prominently sited on the Athelstane Range and forms a significant element in the Rockhampton townscape.

== See also ==
- List of schools in Queensland
