= Queensland National Hotel =

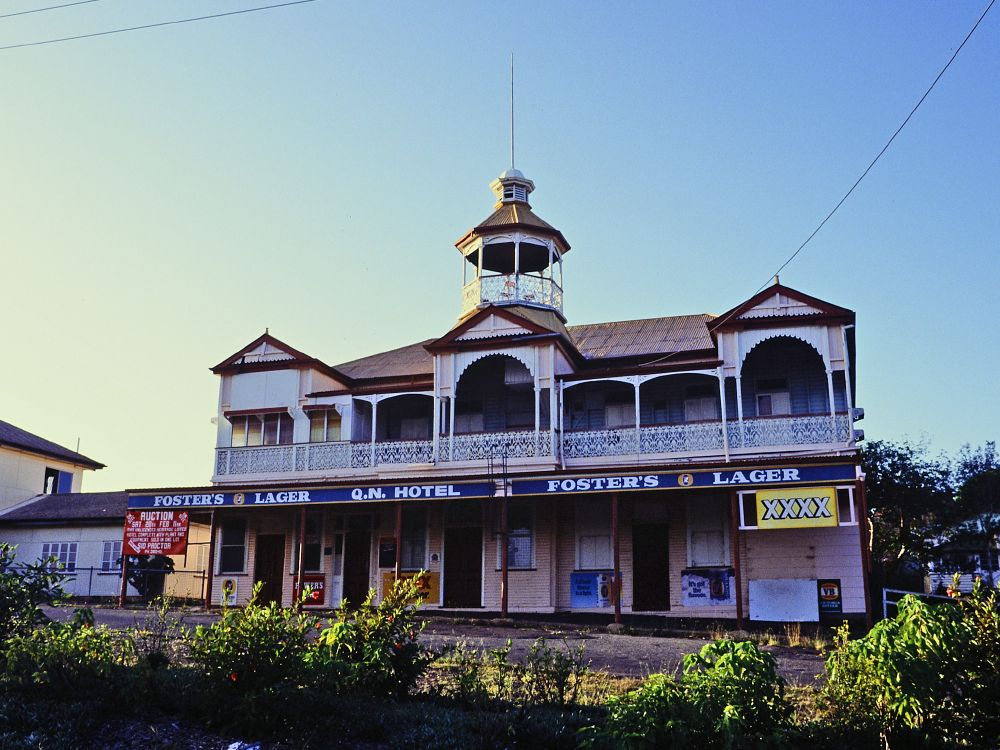
- Queensland National Hotel, 1993

- Location within Queensland Location within Australia
- 23.6459°S 150.3864°E
- Location: 28 Morgan Street, Mount Morgan, Rockhampton Region, Queensland, Australia

History
- Design period: 1870s–1890s (late 19th century)

Site notes
- Architect: John William Wilson

Queensland Heritage Register
- Official name: Queensland National Hotel (former), Wesleyan Mission Hall
- Type: state heritage (built)
- Designated: 21 October 1992
- Reference no.: 600748
- Significant period: 1890s (fabric); 1890–1992 (historical use)
- Significant components: kitchen/kitchen house, cellar, tower

Queensland National Hotel is a heritage-listed former hotel at 28 Morgan Street, Mount Morgan, Rockhampton Region, Queensland, Australia. It was designed by John William Wilson and built in 1890. It is also known as Wesleyan Mission Hall. It was added to the Queensland Heritage Register on 21 October 1992.

== History ==
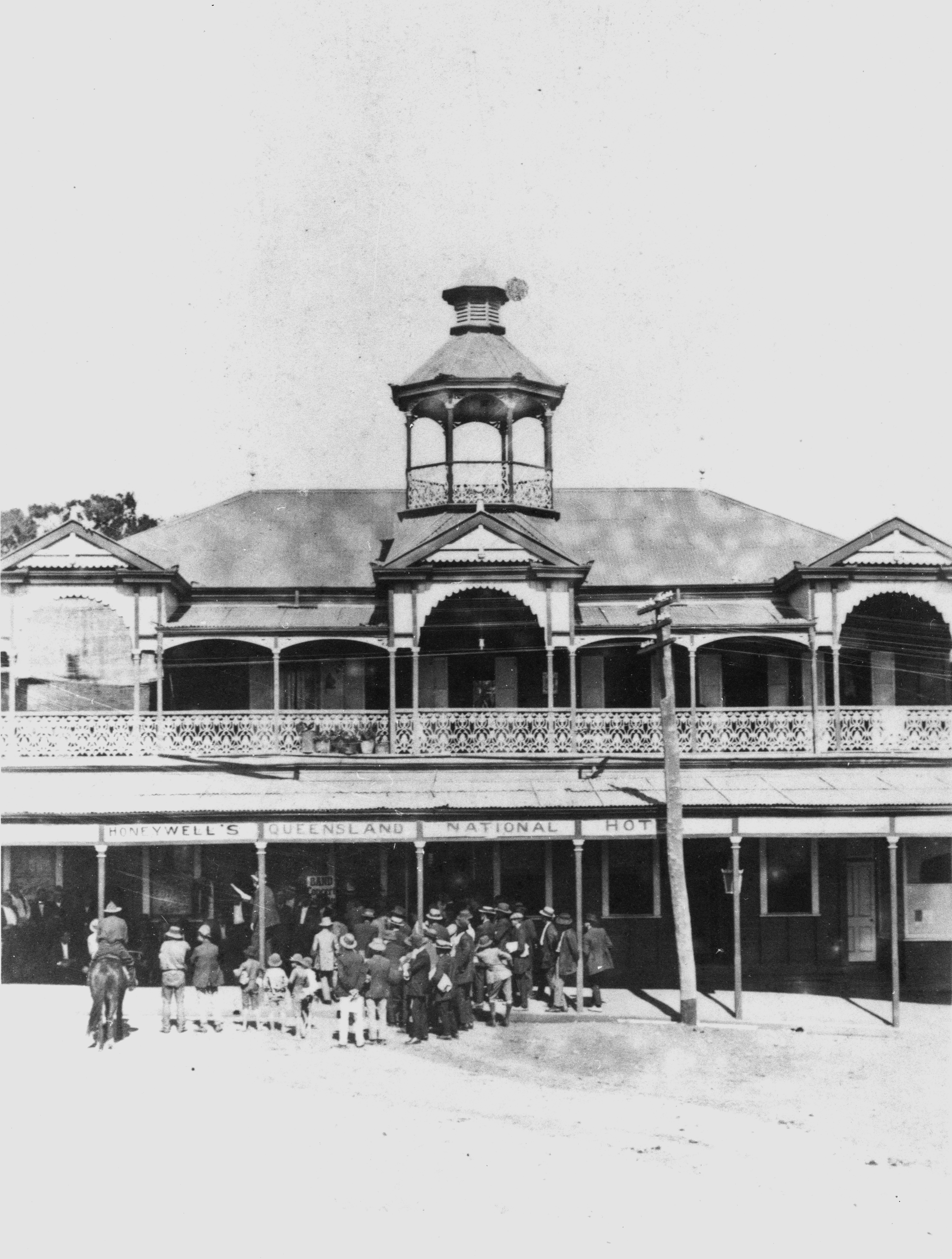
Queensland National Hotel, circa 1914

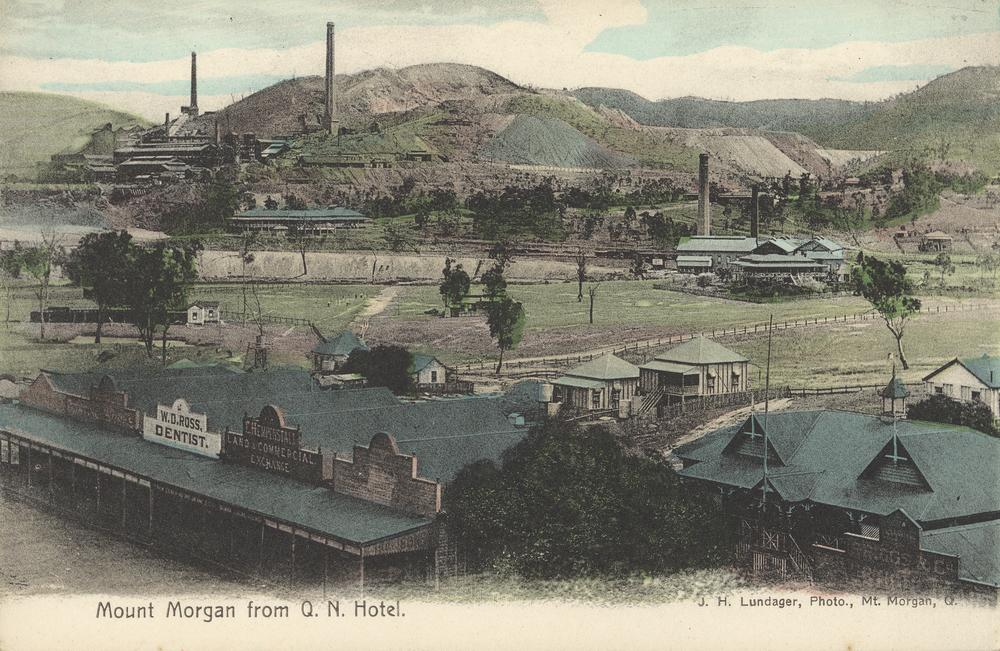
View of the town of Mount Morgan and the mine beyond from the Queensland National Hotel

The Queensland National Hotel is a two-storey timber hotel in Mount Morgan, designed in 1890 by Rockhampton architect, John William Wilson, for widow Sarah Heiser who, together with other family members, was to run several hotels in the district.

The township of Mount Morgan grew with the establishment of what was to become the richest gold mine in the world. Although small mining claims occurred before 1882, the three Morgan Brothers pegged claims which encompassed most of the mountain top in that year. In July they formed a partnership with three Rockhampton businessmen before selling out to them 1886 when the Mount Morgan Gold Mining Company Limited was formed. By the following year even the Post Office Directory noted that "the importance of this place as a goldfield can scarcely be exaggerated." This led to the rapid development of a township to provide an infrastructure for the increasing population. This development included the construction of a number of hotels, of which the Queensland National was one of the most elaborate.

The land on which the former hotel stands was purchased by James Whitman in 1887. As surveys and land sales on goldfields frequently formalised existing property developments, it is possible that there was already a building on the site and a license had been previously granted to Bridget Schneider for a hotel of this name in Mount Morgan. The site was well located on a high point of land between the Post Office and the Queensland National Bank, from which the hotel is assumed to have taken its name, possibly to help visitors to the town to find it easily. Whitman only held the land briefly before selling it to Alfred Palmer who then sold to Sarah Heiser in 1888. She had held a license for the Queensland National Hotel from 1887 and was one of the earliest publicans in Mount Morgan. In 1890, as the wealth and population of Mount Morgan grew, a splendid new hotel was designed for her by John William Wilson.

Wilson was born in Scotland and immigrated to Ballarat around 1854 where he participated in the Eureka Stockade and is reputed to have designed the Eureka flag. In 1864 he moved to Rockhampton where he worked initially as a builder before setting up an architectural practice there in the early 1870s. During the course of a long career, he designed over 200 buildings in Rockhampton and the surrounding district, including many public and commercial buildings such as the Rockhampton School of Arts, Imperial and Commercial Hotels and the Harbour Board Building.

Mount Morgan boomed in the 1890s and a cluster of other hotels were soon erected. These not only provided much needed accommodation for boarders and visitors to the town, but offered meals, such facilities as sample rooms for commercial travellers and billiard rooms for recreation and acted as informal clubs. These functions made them very important in the life of a town, particularly a mining centre where many single men might be working. Mrs Heiser went on to hold the licences for a second Queensland National Hotel in Bajool and the Metropole in Mount Morgan until she died in 1909. The Queensland National was leased for some of this period, but also run by Zalic Heiser between 1899 and 1909. The hotel was finally put up for sale by the estate in 1925.

The tower of the former hotel is the best observation point in Mount Morgan and was used during World War II by the "Mt Morgan Volunteer Air Observer Corps" to maintain a 24-hour watch. They informed Rockhampton base of allied aircraft movements to the west and possible enemy aircraft as Mount Morgan, being a source of essential materials, was considered a possible target.

A new mining company was formed in 1929 from the Mount Morgan Gold Mining Company and continued to produce gold and copper until it closed in 1990. Following the closure of the mine the population of the own reduced sharply. The Queensland National Hotel's license was revoked on 23 July 1992 and the building was put up for sale by auction.

In early 1993 it was purchased by new owners to serve primarily as venue for church related activities and they took up residence there in 1994. Some modifications were made to the hotel to adapt it for its new use, such as the removal of the bars and refrigerators, but change was relatively minor. It was then used for religious services, including weddings, and for youth camps, residential schools, conferences and other events. The number of people using the building fell as people moved away from Mount Morgan with Rockhampton becoming the centre of church activities for the region. The last religious service was held in the hotel in 1999 and it was last used for any church purpose in 2000.

Artists Kate and Brian Moore owned the property from 2002 to 2012 and renovated it to be a family home.

== Description ==
The former Queensland National Hotel is a symmetrically composed two storey timber building with a central and is located on Morgan Street, Mount Morgan.

The building has an awning to the street supported on timber columns with a verandah to the upper floor. This upper section features three gabled projections, the central one of which is surmounted by an octagonal tower with a lantern. There are cast iron balustrade panels to the upper floor verandah and the tower. The upper verandah to the rear of the building has dowel balustrading and has had rooms inserted for toilets. The hipped roof is clad with corrugated iron.

The core building has exposed studs and is lined with beaded boards. The side verandahs have been built in and fibrous cement sheet and batten cladding applied to that section now used as a dining room. The side verandah on the opposite side of the building is now built in with modern fibrous cement planking.

On the ground floor, rooms open from a central hall with a staircase to the upper floor. There are indications of walls being shifted or removed, which appears to have occurred over many years. At least some original joinery is cedar and the doors, door handles and staircase in the hall are of high quality. The doors into the bar have quite ornate brass and timber handles. The main bar area is now open space without bar counters. Under the front section of the room is a small brick- lined cellar with a concrete floor.

The kitchen was originally detached and is now connected to the main building, though it is on a slightly higher level than the rest of the ground floor. It is lined and ceiled with beaded boards and contains modern kitchen benches and a commercial gas range.

The upper floor appears little changed and has bedrooms opening out from a central hallway with a linen press at the end. The rooms are lined with horizontal beaded boards and have 4 panel doors and clear glass transom lights to the hall with French lights leading on to the verandah.

The tower is accessed through a trapdoor at the top of a narrow stair. There is a small platform from which extensive views of the town and coastal area can be had. It has a timber floor and timber ceiling to the cupola with a balustrade of cast iron panels.

== Heritage listing ==
The former Queensland National Hotel was listed on the Queensland Heritage Register on 21 October 1992 having satisfied the following criteria.

The place is important in demonstrating the evolution or pattern of Queensland's history.

Mining has played an important role in the development of Queensland and Mt Morgan was an extraordinarily rich mine that operated for over a hundred years, making a major contribution to the economy of the state and the development of the region. As good quality hotel from the early years of the establishment of the township, the former Queensland National Hotel demonstrates the rapid growth and importance of the field at this time.

The place is important in demonstrating the principal characteristics of a particular class of cultural places.

The former Queensland National Hotel is important as a good example of a substantial timber hotel of its era in form and layout, employing strong architectural features and prominent siting to attract custom. It is connected with the life and work of noted regional architect John William Wilson as a good quality commercial building designed by him.

The place is important because of its aesthetic significance.

Because the former hotel is prominently sited on a high point of the main street in Mount Morgan and is a well composed and detailed building, it makes an important contribution to the streetscape and character of the town.
