= Cahill's Stores, Rockhampton =

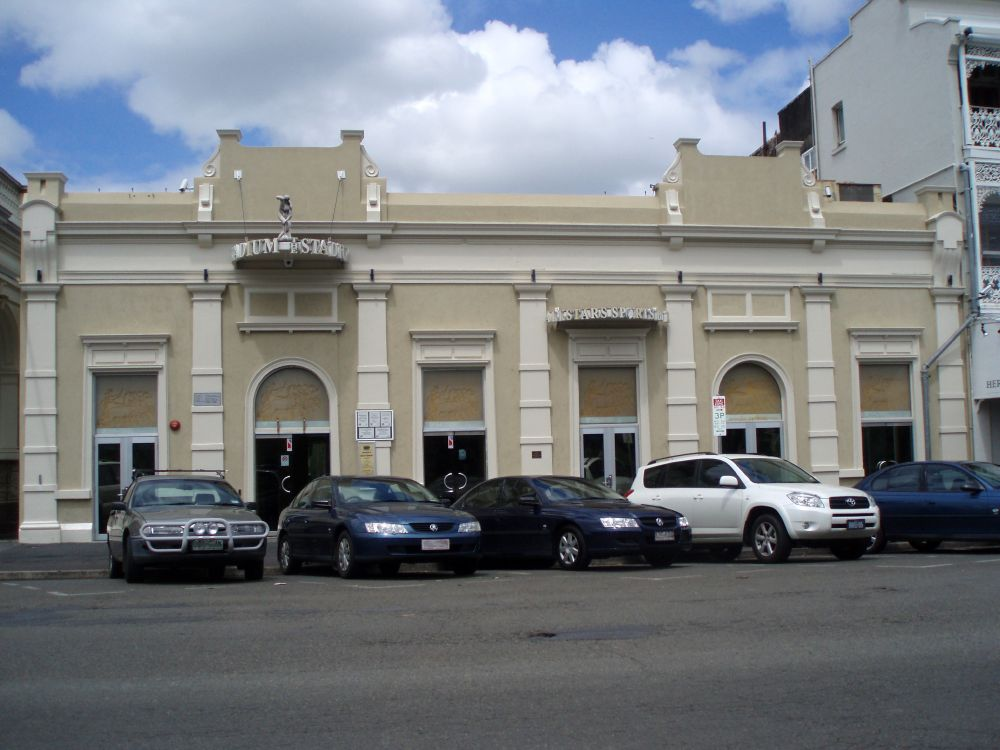
- Former Cahill's Stores, 2009

- Location within Queensland Location within Australia
- 23.3799°S 150.5156°E
- Location: 232–234 Quay Street, Rockhampton, Rockhampton Region, Queensland, Australia

History
- Design period: 1870s–1890s (late 19th century)
- Built: 1889

Site notes
- Architect: John William Wilson
- Architectural style: Classicism

Queensland Heritage Register
- Official name: Cahill's Stores (former), Central Queensland Livestock Co-operative Society, Clarke's Building, Flamingos Nightclub, Stadium Nightclub, KDalgety & Co. Ltd, WG Murray Ltd, Inglis Ltd, Kerrisk Bros
- Type: state heritage (built)
- Designated: 21 October 1992
- Reference no.: 600811
- Significant period: 1890s (fabric); 1889–1980s (historical use as stores)

Cahill's Stores is a heritage-listed commercial building at 232–234 Quay Street, Rockhampton, Rockhampton Region, Queensland, Australia. It was designed by John William Wilson and built in 1889. It is also known as Central Queensland Livestock Co-operative Society, Clarke's Building, Flamingos Nightclub, Stadium Nightclub, Dalgety & Co., WG Murray Ltd, Inglis Ltd, and Kerrisk Bros. It was added to the Queensland Heritage Register on 21 October 1992.

== History ==
The former Cahill's Stores, built of brick and concrete render, were constructed for John and Kate Cahill in 1889. Designed by John William Wilson, the single-storey building housed the Rockhampton office and store of Dalgety & Co. Ltd between 1891 and c.1940.

The architect John William Wilson was a native of Scotland who had arrived in the Australian colonies c. 1854. He practised in Rockhampton from 1874 until 1909. Included in the list of 200 identified buildings for which he is responsible are the Rockhampton School of Arts, the Commercial Hotel and Chambers (now the Heritage Tavern) and the Rockhampton Harbour Board Building. Cahill's Stores were constructed between the sites subsequently occupied by the Commercial Hotel and the Mount Morgan Gold Mining Company Building.

Rockhampton was established on the Fitzroy River on land originally part of Gracemere station, a pastoral property operated by the Archer family. Richard Palmer opened the area's first store on the south-western bank of the river from mid-1856. Following a survey by Arthur F Wood, Rockhampton was proclaimed a town on 25 October 1858. The first sale of allotments occurred the following month. The Municipality of Rockhampton was proclaimed on 15 December 1860. Along with the discovery of gold at Mount Morgan in 1882, the key importance of Rockhampton was its ability to provide goods, services and produce for the population of both the town and its regional hinterland.

Early merchants and storekeepers operated independent, locally based businesses. The first wave of these entrepreneurs, attracted to the area by the promise of gold at nearby Canoona, opened their stores in the late 1850s. A second wave arrived in the 1860s. Early merchants who survived the economic downturn of the late 1860s included John Headrick, Walter Reid and Albrecht Feez. By the 1880s many of Rockhampton's local merchants and agents operated in partnerships. Notable at this time were John M Headrick & Co., EK Ogg, Alex. Reid & Co. and WG Thompson & Co. The independence of these firms, supported strongly by local manufacture of ironmongery, timber joinery and items such as soap and cordial, was a reflection of the self-sufficiency that Rockhampton's community leaders expressed politically through a concurrent movement towards secession.

Commerce in Rockhampton in the late 19th century was very competitive. Up to twenty-seven separate firms provided services as shipping, mercantile or stock and station agents. Although numbers decreased after the bank crash of 1893 and the drought that followed, established companies from other parts of Australia also were attracted to Rockhampton by the profitability of the region.

Two years after its 1889 construction, Cahill's Stores were occupied by Dalgety & Co. Ltd, one of the first southern firms to set up business in Rockhampton. Born in Canada, Frederick Dalgety arrived in Australia in 1833. Initially he gained experience working in other mercantile houses. With two partners, in 1846 he formed Dalgety, Borrodale and Gore. Situated at first in Little Collins Street, Melbourne, this company earned substantial profits during the gold rushes of the 1850s. The head office of Dalgety & Co. was established in London in the same decade. Over the next twenty years the company opened mercantile offices in New Zealand and New South Wales (1878). The limited liability company, Dalgety & Co. Ltd, was registered in London on 29 April 1884, after which operations extended into Western Australia (1889) and Queensland (1891). Frederick Dalgety died in 1894.

The company's first Queensland office was in Cahill's Stores at Rockhampton. FHB Turner commenced as manager. Their Brisbane office was not established until 1894. The first Townsville office for Dalgety & Co. Ltd opened in leased premises in Denham Street in 1896. From that time the company was well represented in regional Queensland and played a significant role in the development of the pastoral industry, particularly in the production of wool. Unlike Rockhampton, where the company would always lease its premises, a new Dalgety & Co. two-storey building was constructed in Townsville in 1923–24. The company's need for investment in a substantial building in Rockhampton may have been reduced by the financial strength of other mercantile companies. Their competition included G. S. Curtis, John M. Headrick & Co., Goldsbrough Mort & Co. and Walter Reid & Co, all of which constructed large stores or warehouses in Rockhampton between 1883 and 1902.

At different times smaller companies also occupied sections of the former Cahill's Stores. These included W. G. Murray Ltd, a warehouse and manufacturing company based there in the first decade of the 1900s and Inglis Ltd, tea merchants housed in the northern part of the store in the 1920s.

Following the death of John Cahill in 1915, ownership of the building passed to trustees, then to Elizabeth O'Brien and later Brian O'Brien. In 1949 an easement was granted over the site, allowing it to be sold as two separate stores divided by a party wall. The Australian Red Cross Society purchased the northern store, closest to William Street. It was not until 1983 that the building was returned to a single owner. In the interval it had been occupied by, amongst others, Kerrisk Bros. and Central Livestock and Produce Co-operative Society.

In 1985 the owners of the Cahill's Stores building also held title to the Heritage Tavern, formerly the Commercial Hotel and Chambers. With side access opening directly into the hotel and its party wall removed, the former stores building was converted into a nightclub. The open, singular space inside the building has served this purpose since then.

== Description ==
The former Cahill Stores, a single-storey brick building, is located on a block of Quay Street that is populated almost exclusively with other buildings of heritage significance, including the Heritage Tavern and the Mount Morgan Gold Mining Company Building (now the Australian Broadcasting Corporation studios) on either side; Clewett's Building, Walter Reid Court, and Avonleigh. Quay Street overlooks the Fitzroy River and is recognised as a streetscape of historical significance in the Australian Heritage Commission's Register of the National Estate. About 200 metres (660 ft) to the north-west of this building is Rockhampton's central pedestrian mall and four blocks to the south-east is the city's central railway station. Running along the short, south-western edge of the allotment is Quay Lane, which forms part of a system of such laneways that inhabits the city centre's orthogonal grid and services its primary streets. The grid is aligned to the course of the Fitzroy River that flows from the north- west to the south-east.

The parapeted front facade to Quay Street is composed of classical motifs modelled with cement render in a free but also spare way. The street frontage is approximately 20 metres (66 ft) wide. There is a parapet wall to the side facade adjacent to the ABC studios, which can be viewed from a narrow corridor of space separating part of the two buildings. It is clear from the patterning of brickwork in this facade that a number of its openings have been closed up at some point in the past. The former Cahill's Stores abut the Commercial Hotel and Chambers building (former) to the north. On Quay Lane, the roof toward the front of the building appears to be hipped, with a broken segment extending to the rear facade. It is clad in corrugated iron. The rear segments of the side parapet walls step down towards the rear facade, which is constructed of unpainted concrete masonry. A great deal of air-conditioning equipment and support structures populate the roof.

The Quay Street facade is divided vertically into six bays by a series of pilasters. Above the second bay in from each end, there is a tall parapet projection denoting where two entry doors open into the building. There are glass double doors in each bay, however those beneath the parapet projections have fanlights above them, rather than simple highlights. The parapet projections are accented with render consoles. Beneath the variegated parapet top, a render entablature runs between each end of the front facade. The depth of the blank frieze seems somewhat exaggerated when compared with those of the cornice and architrave. Above the end pilasters, the entablature is visually enclosed by two narrow projections of the parapet top. The modelling in line with the entablature is reminiscent of single triglyphs.

The Tuscan-style pilasters sit on bases and plinths, the plinth line being expressed in the rest of the facade. Beneath the line of the door heads, the pilasters are evenly divided by four stringcourses, reminiscent of rustication. There is simple render modelling around each of the square headed doors, which is suggestive of a frame. Those with the fanlights sit in a panel of wall that sits slightly proud of the remaining facade. Above each of the square-headed doors is a render panel topped with a cornice-like course and three modillions. The edges of the doors with fanlights are decorated with simple render frames. A render panel, placed higher than the others on the facade, sits above these door openings. The panel is topped again with a cornice-like course and three modillions.

The interior has been extensively remodelled and currently houses nightclub facilities. The party wall that once separated the two segments of the building has been broken through at a number of points.

== Heritage listing ==
The former Cahill's Stores was listed on the Queensland Heritage Register on 21 October 1992 having satisfied the following criteria.

The place is important in demonstrating the evolution or pattern of Queensland's history.

The former Cahill's Stores are important in demonstrating the evolution of mercantile history in Queensland.

The place is important because of its aesthetic significance.

Designed by architect John W. Wilson, the former Cahill's Stores exhibit integrity as a single-storey warehouse and store building, at the same time contributing to the continuity and character of the streetscape of Quay Street.

The place has a special association with the life or work of a particular person, group or organisation of importance in Queensland's history.

The former Cahill's Stores are of heritage significance as for nearly fifty years the building was associated with Dalgety & Co. Ltd, one of the largest and most successful pastoral firms in Australia.
