= Trustee Chambers =

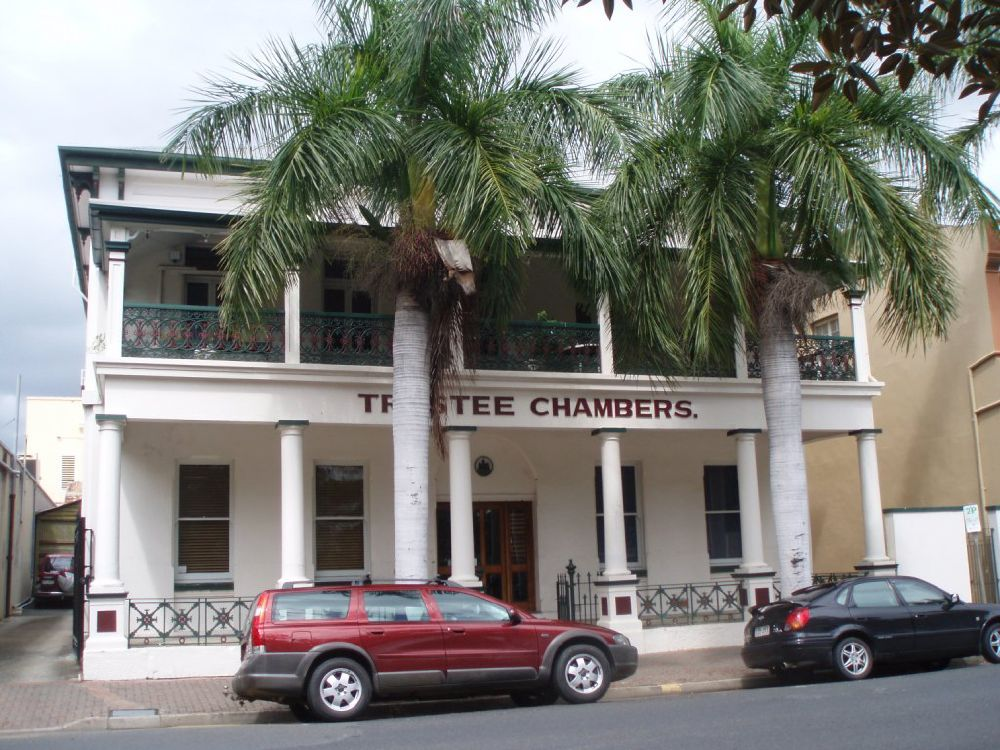
- Trustee Chambers, 2009

- Location within Queensland Location within Australia
- 23.3769°S 150.5137°E
- Location: 170 Quay Street, Rockhampton, Rockhampton Region, Queensland, Australia

History
- Design period: 1870s–1890s (late 19th century)
- Built: 1876–1877

Site notes
- Architect: John William Wilson

Queensland Heritage Register
- Official name: Trustee Chambers, Residence of Dr William Callaghan, River Chambers
- Type: state heritage (built)
- Designated: 21 October 1992
- Reference no.: 600802
- Significant period: 1870s (fabric); 1870s–1910s (historical)
- Significant components: residential accommodation – main house, service wing

Trustee Chambers is a heritage-listed former house and subsequent commercial building at 170 Quay Street, Rockhampton, Rockhampton Region, Queensland, Australia. It was designed by architect John William Wilson and built from 1876 to 1877. It is also known as Residence of Dr William Callaghan and River Chambers. It was added to the Queensland Heritage Register on 21 October 1992.

== History ==
Trustee Chambers is a two storeyed masonry building, built in 1877 in Quay Street, Rockhampton as the private residence of Dr William Callaghan house surgeon for the Rockhampton Hospital. It was designed by John William Wilson and was the most expensive private contract for the design of a building carried out by Wilson. It has been used since 1919 as professional offices, and since 1950 has been the offices of the Union Trustee Company.

The Archer brothers had made a private expedition to the Rockhampton district in 1853, and were the first Europeans to record and chart the Fitzroy River. Their establishment of Gracemere Station lead to further pastoral expansion into the area.

After the short lived Canoona gold rush of 1858 Rockhampton was proclaimed as a town and declared a "port of entry" in 1858. The first sale of town allotments was held in Rockhampton on 17 and 18 November 1858.

William Archer purchased a block of land fronting Quay Street In 1859 John Cameron purchased Allotment 6 of Section 45 from Archer. This was subsequently transferred to William James Dalzell of Melbourne. In 1866 Heinrich Schmidt purchased the allotment. Quay Street at the time of the sale was a busy thoroughfare fronting onto the town wharves of the Fitzroy River.

Heinrich Schmidt was the first baker to be resident in Rockhampton. It is unsure whether a residence was erected by Schmidt on this property. In 1870 the allotment was sold by Schmidt to the original owner of the present building on this property, Dr William Callaghan.

Dr William Callaghan, who 170 Quay Street is best associated with arrived in Rockhampton in July 1861. Callaghan was born in 1832. William was the second doctor to practice in the town. A few days after his arrival in the town Callaghan began to establish his practice in the Rockhampton area. He was then appointed as the Coroner and District Medical Officer for Rockhampton a short time after arriving in Rockhampton.

Callaghan was subsequently appointed to the position of House Surgeon at the Rockhampton Hospital. Dr Callaghan became one of the best known individuals resident in Rockhampton from the 1860s until his death in 1912. He was well known for his love of horse racing, and was an excellent rider heavily involved in the local jockey club. The race course built in North Rockhampton was named Callaghan Park in honour of the medical practitioner.

The first residence of Dr Callaghan was in Kent Street. The residence was sold by Dr Callaghan in 1863 to Father Charles Murlay. It was then used as a small convent for the Sisters of Mercy after their arrival in Rockhampton.

Dr William Callaghan married in 1869, to Aimee Henrietta Cowper the daughter of William Cowper, the Dean of Sydney. After his marriage they resided in timber residence, before deciding to erect the residence in Quay Street.

A tender for a new residence for William Callaghan was let on 16 May 1876. The tender was awarded to builder John Ferguson. Ferguson had arrived in Rockhampton in the early 1860s and became a building contractor in the town. In 1870–1, he constructed the workers cottages at the Lakes Creek meat works. Ferguson retired from the building trade in 1888, after becoming one of the half dozen millionaires in Rockhampton, a result of his investing in the Mount Morgan Mine.

Ferguson was later to become the founding chairman of the Rockhampton Club (1888), a club that would be eventually located next door to the home of Dr Callaghan. He was also the president of the Central Queensland Separation League advocating the creation of a new state centred on Rockhampton. Ferguson went on to build the mansion residence of Kenmore in 1894, which he named after his birthplace in Scotland. It was also expected at the time that he would also become the first Governor of the separated state, should this objective be achieved.

Dr Callaghan's residence was designed by John William Wilson. Wilson was a prolific architect and builder active in Rockhampton from 1864. Wilson had been born in Scotland in 1829, and is thought to have migrated to Victoria during the time of the gold rushes. In 1854 he was present at Bakery Hill in Ballarat. Wilson also laid claim to the design of the Southern Cross flag that flew over the Eureka stockade.

After his arrival in Rockhampton, Wilson worked as builder and operator of a shipping concern from the Port of Yaamba to Rockhampton. He advertised as an architect from 1875. Wilson was responsible for the design of two hundred buildings in and around the Rockhampton region. Some of these included the Rockhampton School of Arts and the Leichardt Hotel.

The work of Rockhampton architect John William Wilson was recognised by the Daily Northern Argus:

During the last five or six years,...nothing in either stone or brick and mortar has reared its head above the ground, although a good deal of patching up work has been done, all of which has fallen into the hands of one architect Mr. J. W. Wilson who is...about the most practical man in the town in the profession... Amongst many of the jobs executed by him are those of the front of the Joint Stock Bank, a most creditable piece of work... We also understand that Mr. Wilson is the architect for Dr. Callaghan's new residence in Quay Street, adjoining the old "Argus" office. The patronage bestowed upon Mr. Wilson fully corroborates our prediction some two years since, that he was the right man in the right place.

Total cost for the building was £5050, being for a two storeyed brick residence. The original contract as signed on 14 June 1876 was for a lump sum of £3 969 being for labour and materials. After completion the residence became the home of the Callaghan family.

Dr Callaghan died on 1 April 1912, and the building remained the private residence of his widow Aimee Henrietta until 1919. At this time the building was bought by William Joseph Phelps Harris. In 1933 this title was transferred to Harris Pty. Ltd. Harris and Co also owned the Harris and Co. emporium store in Rockhampton, a three storeyed retail store, complete with electric lifts and a roof garden tea room.

The Callaghan residence was renamed River Chambers. From 1920 until 1950 during the ownership by Harris the building was used as professional offices for various tenants including a dentist, stock and station agent. River Chambers was also the address for professional offices for individuals such as E R Larcombe, the only Barrister practicing in Rockhampton, B S Barcoe Stock and Share Brokers It also used as the consultation rooms for Dr. R S Leeds. In 1936 Arthur Bradford, Barrister resident in the offices, succeeding Larcombe as a Barrister practising in Rockhampton.

River Chambers passed into the ownership of The Union Trustee Company of Australia Ltd in August 1950, (also known as the Union Fidelity Trustee Company). From 1952 the ground floor was occupied by the offices of the Union Trustee Company, with the upper storey being let out as professional offices. After the building was bought it was renamed as Trustee Chambers. Internal renovations were carried out at this time, with the main staircase being removed.

Changes have been introduced into the building since passing into the ownership of Union Trustee Company, including air conditioning on the lower level. Trustee Chambers has had the original entry way restored in 1991.

A special stained glass window was commissioned and installed in 1995 containing four scenes depicting the occupations of the previous tenants and owners of the building. These representations include William Knox D'Arcy, who made a fortune in selling off shares in the Mount Morgan Mine syndicate. He was later to fund the search for oil in Persia, and found the company that gave rise to British Petroleum. Harris is also featured as a previous owner of the building when it was called River Chambers.

== Description ==
Trustee Chambers is a two-storeyed rendered brick building overlooking the Fitzroy River on Quay Street, Rockhampton. The site, covering only half of the area between Quay Street and Quay Lane is occupied by the building which is of rectangular plan with a one storeyed brick wing extending from the rear along the north western property boundary.

Trustee Chambers has a hipped corrugated iron roof, recently reclad. The Quay Street elevation features a double storeyed verandah, the awning supported on the ground floor by six substantial cast iron columns with Doric capitals resting on square planned bases which are linked with a wrought iron cross braced balustrade on a rendered brick plinth. The fascia board above the columns at the level of the first floor has lettering "TRUSTEE CHAMBERS" painted onto it. On the first floor the skillion roofed verandah, hipped at the ends, is supported on timber columns aligned with the ground floor cast iron columns. The first floor verandah has a cast iron balustrade and the stop chamfered columns have simple timber brackets and decorative mouldings. The soffit of this verandah is clad with timber boarding and the concrete floor is carpeted. On the face of the building between the verandah awning and the eaves line are several single eaves brackets regularly spaced to align with the columns below.

The ground floor elevation has a centrally located doorway housed in an arched recess flanked by pairs of rectangular windows housed in rectangular recesses. The window openings are fitted with double hung casements. The upper floor has a series of half glazed French doors providing access from the internal rooms to the verandah.

The rear elevation is also lined with a double storeyed verandah, constructed from simple timber posts supporting a skillion awning. An open tread timber stair provides access from the ground floor verandah to the upper floor verandah which is partially lined with a fibrous cement balustrade and is ceiled with timber boarding. The rear of the building is of painted and bagged brickwork.

The interior of the upper floor of the building is arranged with a central hall running parallel to Quay Street which houses the stair and provides access to the rooms. The lower floor, has been subject to major alterations which have modified the floor plan. Most significantly walls have been removed and, in some places realigned, to form a large reception area, to which access in gained via the entrance doorway from the ground floor verandah. This doorway is fitted with four glazed hinged panels which are centre opening.

The building was constructed with plaster walls and timber boarded ceilings with plaster ceiling roses, many of which survive without light fittings. A suspended grid ceiling has been added to the ground floor and services, including lighting and air conditioning are ducted in the cavity formed between the original and the new ceiling. Individual air conditioning units have been inserted above the openings in many of the first floor rooms.

Generally the interior, where intact, is finely finished with elaborate plaster cornices and timber skirtings. Fine timber joinery survives throughout the interior and this is of high quality craftsmanship. Several chimney places survive including two white marble examples on the first floor, one with elaborate corbelling and complete with an early cast iron fireplace.

A fine timber stair has been reconstructed in its original position centrally located against the north western wall. This dog legged stair is lit by a large round headed arched stair window which has been recently fitted with a leadlight panel, incorporating five round stained glass sections with images which symbolise the various owners of the building.

At the rear of Trustee Chambers is a one storeyed brick extension with hipped corrugated iron roof, this extends toward the rear boundary wall of the site also of corrugated iron. In this rear area is a small car parking space.

== Heritage listing ==
Trustee Chambers was listed on the Queensland Heritage Register on 21 October 1992 having satisfied the following criteria.

The place is important in demonstrating the evolution or pattern of Queensland's history.

It is one of the earliest buildings still extant in Quay Street Rockhampton. Trustee Chambers is significant as an example of the development of Quay Street as a residential area and is contemporary to other buildings such as Avonleigh.

The place is important because of its aesthetic significance.

Trustee Chambers is a well composed 19th century building featuring many fine elements and makes an important contribution to the streetscape of Quay Street and complements the adjoining Rockhampton Club.

Trustee Chambers has considerable aesthetic value as a well composed building which contributes to the Quay Street streetscape. The building contains many fine internal and external features, including the ground floor cast iron columns and the internal joinery and plasterwork.

The place has a special association with the life or work of a particular person, group or organisation of importance in Queensland's history.

Trustee Chambers built in 1877 is significant for its association with the life and work of Dr William Callaghan resident of Rockhampton from 1861 until his death in 1912. It was the private residence of the Callaghan family from 1877 until 1919. It is also an important example of the work of prolific Rockhampton architect John William Wilson, which includes four other buildings along Quay Street.
