= Clewett's Building =

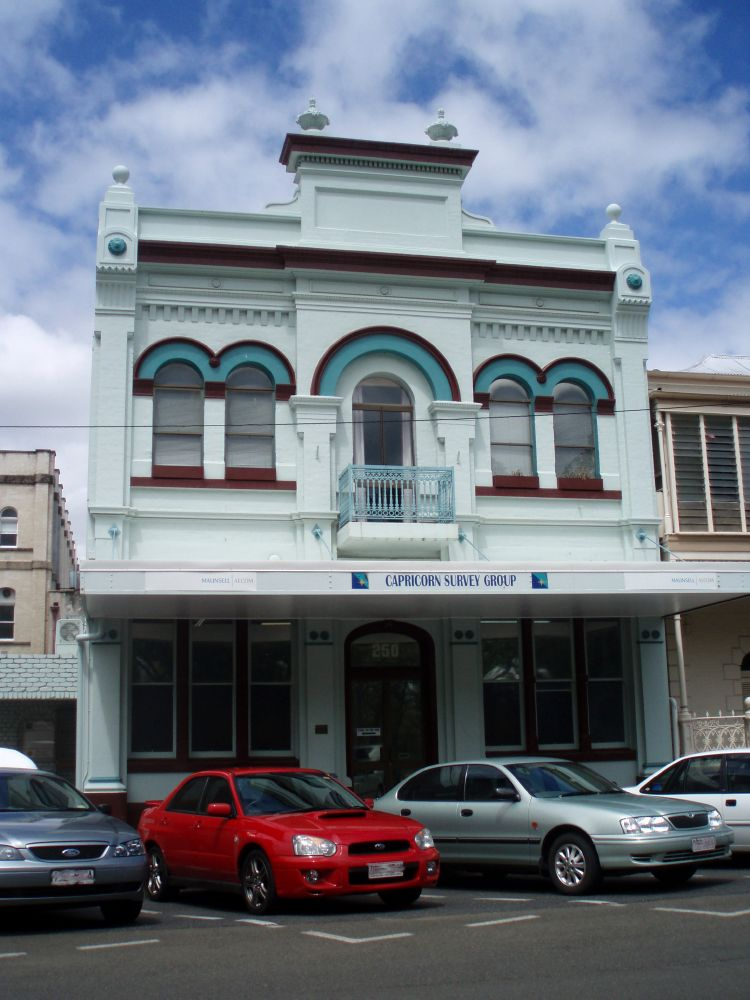
- Clewett's Building, 2009

- Location within Queensland Location within Australia
- 23.3808°S 150.5163°E
- Location: 250 Quay Street, Rockhampton, Rockhampton Region, Queensland, Australia

History
- Design period: 1870s–1890s (late 19th century)
- Built: c. 1887

Site notes
- Architectural style: Classicism

Queensland Heritage Register
- Official name: Clewett's Building (former), Capricorn Survey Consultants Pty Ltd, Herron Todd White Building, JM Headrick & Co., W G Thompson & Co., Lamberton & Co., RM Gow & Co., St Andrew's Hospital, Herron Todd Valuers
- Type: state heritage (built)
- Designated: 21 October 1992
- Reference no.: 600814
- Significant period: 1880s (fabric) c. 1887–ongoing (historical commercial use)

Clewett's Building is a heritage-listed former warehouse at 250 Quay Street, Rockhampton, Rockhampton Region, Queensland, Australia. It was built c. 1887. It is also known as Capricorn Survey Consultants Pty Ltd, Herron Todd White Building, JM Headrick & Co., W G Thompson & Co., Lamberton & Co., RM Gow & Co., St Andrew's Hospital, and Herron Todd Valuers. It was added to the Queensland Heritage Register on 21 October 1992.

== History ==
The former Clewett's building, built as a two-storeyed warehouse building, is thought to have been constructed for Felix Clewett (a Member of the Queensland Legislative Council) in the mid-1880s.

Following its initial occupation by the Archer brothers at Gracemere after 1853, Rockhampton was proclaimed a town and declared a port of entry in 1858. The first sale of town allotments was held in November of that year. Charles Campen purchased the Quay street site, conveniently close to the town's Fitzroy River wharves, on 16 August 1860.

In 1884 title for the land was transferred to Felix Clewett who held the property until his death in 1913. Until the financial downturn of 1866 Clewett had worked as a trainee surveyor under Frederick Byerley, Engineer of Roads of the Northern District. Just prior to his purchase of this Quay Street allotment he was operating a wholesale and retail store in Blackall.

Rockhampton's early merchants and storekeepers operated as independent, locally based businesses. The first wave of these entrepreneurs, attracted to the area by the promise of gold at nearby Canoona, opened their stores in the late 1850s. A second wave arrived in the 1860s. Some operated in partnerships. By the late 19th century, commerce in Rockhampton was very competitive with up to twenty-seven separate firms providing services such as shipping, mercantile or stock and station agents. Notable in merchandising during the 1880s were John M Headrick & Co., EK Ogg, Alex. Reid & Co. and WG Thompson & Co. The independence of these firms, supported strongly by local manufacture of ironmongery, timber joinery and items such as soap and cordial, was a reflection of the self-sufficiency that Rockhampton's community leaders expressed politically through a concurrent movement towards secession.

Like many stores which operated at this time, the former Clewett's building was occupied initially by locally based merchants. This changed from the early 1890s when large southern firms, attracted to the area by the wealth of the Mount Morgan Gold Mining Company and Rockhampton's rural hinterland, established branches in Rockhampton, supplanting many local stock and station agents, wool produce brokers and others in the chain of commerce. Amongst the first was Dalgety and Co, which opened an office in Quay Street in 1891.

By 1887, JM Headrick and Andrew Newton, operating as JM Headrick & Co, General Merchants and Importers, had moved their business to Clewett's Quay Street building where they had taken up a seven-year lease from 1 April 1887. Newspaper advertisements from 1887 for John M Headrick & Co. identify the ship used to transport the company's goods, emphasising this local firm's direct links to suppliers overseas. Prior to taking up the lease on Clewett's property in 1887, JM Headrick & Co were situated in East Street. The Headrick family were strongly associated with business and civic interests in Rockhampton, with John Headrick Snr commencing business as early as 1862.

In 1893, after the retirement of Andrew Newton, John Mackay Headrick continued in partnership with his brother Arthur. Their success was such that at the end of their lease on Clewett's Quay Street site in 1894, the company moved to a substantial new two-storeyed premises in East Street, between William and Derby Streets. Despite Headrick's move out of the Quay Street building, an association remained between Headrick and Clewett, as in August 1890, Headrick had married Felix Clewett's daughter, Annie Isabel Clewett. Following Headrick's move back to East Street to the company's new building (John M Headrick & Co Building), the Quay Street store was occupied by the mercantile company and agency, Clewett and Thompson. William George Thompson was a well-known agent for a number of companies. After service in the Boer War, Thompson returned to his business, served as president of the Rockhampton Chamber of Commerce and, in conjunction with DW Jackson, as mercantile, insurance, shipping and forwarding agents. The firm also supplied stock and station requirements, groceries, wines, spirits, beers, tobaccos, cigars, cigarettes and butchers' requisites.

While still a partner with Thompson, Felix Clewett also had other interests. After July 1890 he served as a member of the Legislative Council of Queensland. In 1909, following the introduction of steam trams in Rockhampton, which opened up new areas for housing, Felix Clewett was amongst the first to develop residential estates in the Allenstown vicinity. After Clewett's death in February 1913, Thompson purchased the Quay Street store. In December 1922 he was elected to the Australian Senate. He served until June 1932.

Yet another store, wine and spirits merchants Lamberton and Co, was established in the building after 1926. Royal Insurance Co. and Bluff Colliery Co. Ltd also had their offices in the building.

In December 1943 transfer of title site passed to RM Gow Pty Ltd. This company, formed in Brisbane, manufactured the Gold Crest brand of produce and conducted a wholesale grocery business from the Quay Street site.

The use of the store did not change after 1967 when ownership of the building was transferred to Walter Reid & Co. This firm owned the warehouse nearby at the corner of Quay and Derby Streets. With the intention of establishing a hospital, the Presbyterian Church of Queensland purchased both sites in July 1976. This did not eventuate and the building was bought by Herron Todd Valuers in July 1979.

The building was extensively renovated in the late 1980s. The building continues to be occupied by the Capricorn Survey Group which encompasses Herron Todd White Valuers.

== Description ==
The former Clewett's building is located on a block of Quay Street that is populated almost exclusively with other buildings of heritage significance; those listed on the Queensland Heritage Register include: Walter Reid Court, the former Commercial Hotel and Chambers (now the Heritage Tavern), the former Cahill's Stores, the Goldsbrough Mort Building (now the Capricornia studios of the Australian Broadcasting Commission) and the residence Avonleigh.

Running along the short, south-western edge of the allotment is Quay Lane, which forms part of a system of such laneways that inhabits the city centre's orthogonal grid and services its primary streets. The grid is aligned to the course of the Fitzroy River that flows from the north-west to the south-east.

The former Clewett's building is a two-storey brick building, of which the side facade to the south-east is undecorated but painted, the rear and remaining side facades are unpainted. The Quay Street facade is faced with cement render and painted. The long gable roof clad in corrugated iron is contained behind parapets on each facade. Its triangular shape in section is expressed on the rear facade. The front face of the building, approximately nine metres wide, is symmetrically arranged and its classical details are modelled using cement render.

Vertically, the building is divided into three basic parts by pilasters on each end and a central section sitting proud of the flanking walls. The central section of facade, approximately two metres wide, is surmounted by a tall projection of the parapet on which sit two decorative urns. The projection is capped with a cornice-like moulding, below which is a course of dentils and a further stringcourse. Curved render brackets connect the central projection to the lower halves of the parapet. Each end of the lower section, above the stylised framing pilasters, is accented with render globes. The capitals to the end pilasters incorporate some fluting, making them reminiscent of single triglyphs. Above these are placed single rosette-like ornaments.

A cornice-like stringcourse, running the full width between the outermost pilasters, creates a strong horizontal line on the facade to Quay Street. Beneath this is further render modelling and then a line of upper storey windows on either side of a central door. This French door opens onto a small, cantilevered balcony edged with cast iron balustrading. A simple label mould frames the semicircular fanlight atop this door, its ends resting on the tops of pilasters that extend to street level. The arched heads of the two double-hung sash windows on either side of the door are similarly framed. A suspended footpath canopy separates the upper and lower sections of the front facade. In the lower section, the four pilasters sit on an expressed plinth. Beneath the balcony is a set of French doors topped with a basket arch-shaped fanlight. On either side of this door are three double-hung sash windows, the heads of which meet the underside of the footpath canopy.

Currently entry to the building is gained through an entry area and opening in the south-eastern facade near Quay Street. This entry area appears to be built on the adjacent empty allotment.

The long south-eastern facade of the building is punctured by a number of small, square windows opening from the upper storey, and some service pipes. An uncovered stairway leads to the upper storey. A skillion-roofed concrete block addition has been added to the ground storey towards the Quay Lane end of this facade.

The lower storey of the rear facade has a central set of large loading doors. Above this are three symmetrically placed double-hung sash windows with brick sills and low arches to their heads. This facade has two rainwater heads and associated downpipes, the one in the southernmost corner appearing to be set into the wall. The facade to the north-west has only three, small windows in it.

The interior of the building has been extensively remodelled to accommodate commercial offices. A large room faces Quay Street on the lower storey, while three rooms do so on the upper storey. A row of steel columns supports the upper-level floor. These have been encased in fire retardant panelling.

== Heritage listing ==
The former Clewett's Building was listed on the Queensland Heritage Register on 21 October 1992 having satisfied the following criteria.

The place is important in demonstrating the evolution or pattern of Queensland's history.

Thought to be constructed in the mid-1880s, for Felix Clewett, the former Clewett's building is important in demonstrating the pattern of mercantile trading in a major regional centre of Queensland, representing a phase of commercial development and growth in Rockhampton during the late 19th century precipitated by trade at the port and the success of the Mount Morgan gold mines during the 1880s.

The place is important in demonstrating the principal characteristics of a particular class of cultural places.

The former Clewett's building is significant as it retains the chief characteristics of a late Victorian commercial premises, comprising a street facade that is articulated with freely employed classical details common among such buildings, whilst the unadorned side and rear facades reflect its utilitarian purpose.

The place is important because of its aesthetic significance.

The former Clewett's building exhibits integrity as a two-storeyed warehouse and store at the same time contributing to the continuity and character of the 19th century commercial streetscape of Quay Street.
