= GS Curtis Stores =

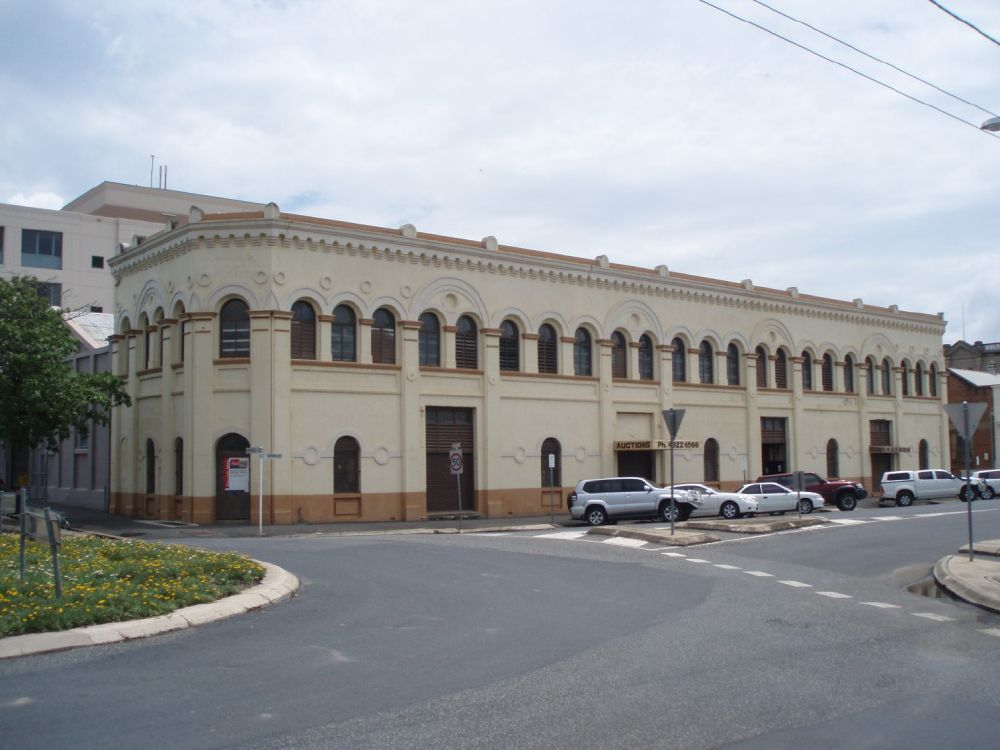
- GS Curtis Stores, 2009

- Location within Queensland Location within Australia
- 23.382°S 150.5151°E
- Location: Bolsover Street, Rockhampton City, Rockhampton, Rockhampton Region, Queensland, Australia

History
- Design period: 1870s–1890s (late 19th century)
- Built: 1882–1883

Site notes
- Architect: John William Wilson

Queensland Heritage Register
- Official name: AMV Warehouse, GS Curtis Stores
- Type: state heritage (built)
- Designated: 21 October 1992
- Reference no.: 600787
- Significant period: 1880s (fabric); 1883–ongoing (historical use)
- Significant components: hoist
- Builders: P Waters & Sons

GS Curtis Stores is a heritage-listed warehouse at Bolsover Street, Rockhampton City, Rockhampton, Rockhampton Region, Queensland, Australia. It was designed by John William Wilson and built from 1882 to 1883 by P Waters & Sons. It is also known as AMV Warehouse. It was added to the Queensland Heritage Register on 21 October 1992.

== History ==
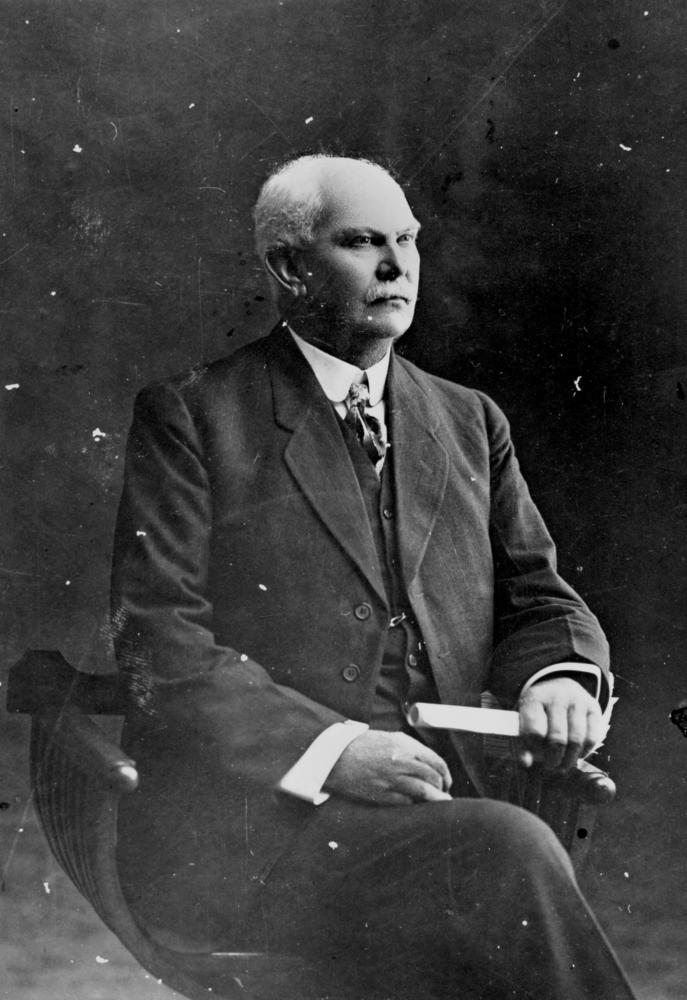
George Silas Curtis

This masonry warehouse was erected in 1883 for auctioneer George Silas Curtis MLA for Rockhampton, as a consignment store for imported goods. It was designed by architect John William Wilson and stands in a precinct of 19th century warehouses that developed in the area to serve the passing trade at the wharves.

GS Curtis first arrived in Rockhampton in 1863 and returned in 1866 to enter Wormald's auctioneering firm which he acquired in 1872. As a prominent auctioneer, land holder and real estate speculator Curtis became one of the city's most vigorous and influential public figures. Curtis had campaigned through the Chamber of Commerce for railway extensions and a deep-water port for Rockhampton and from 1889 acted as the leading exponent of territorial separation in Queensland. Curtis was chairman of the Central Queensland Territorial Separation League when it formed in 1889.

In late 1882 George Silas Curtis commissioned architect John Wilson to design a warehouse to accommodate his merchandise. The warehouse was constructed at a time when Rockhampton had established itself as the major port in central Queensland serving a vast area of pastoral, agricultural and mining lands and was entering a boom period corresponding with the commencement of gold mining at Mount Morgan in 1882. Rockhampton was the commercial centre of central Queensland where merchant's like Curtis could successfully base their business.

Curtis had originally commissioned Wilson to design a single-storeyed warehouse with foundations to carry a second floor, but was convinced by Wilson to construct a double-storey building outright. Wilson was reported in the Daily Northern Argus of 1883 as wanting to construct a building that would provide a continuing substantial capacity and that "would be different in its general outline to other buildings in the town" as well as being reasonably inexpensive. P Waters & Sons commenced construction of the warehouse in August 1882 and completed the building in early 1883.

The warehouse was described as "substantial & roomy" and as the only building of its size in Rockhampton. The erection of the warehouse was seen as an advancement for the city and was associated with the atmosphere of confidence which promoted Rockhampton as the possible capital of a new separate state.

At the time of construction the building had frontages to Bolsover Street, East Lane and Derby Street and had been rendered with a tint imitating the colour of the local Stanwell freestone. The Derby Street frontage had four double-sliding doors on the ground floor with arched windows above protected internally by iron bars and surmounted by a half-circle motif connected with the pilasters. On the upper storey there were 23 arched windows with the top portion hinged to allow opening.

At each end of the warehouse was a corner splay which formed an entrance with the inscription "G.S. Curtis, 1870" in ribbon lettering. The words "G.S Curtis Consignment Stores" were also in relief at either end of the building. The second floor was accessible by two staircases which were boxed and separated from the ground floor, each fronting Bolsover Street and East Lane.

The ground floor had an open plan with eight iron pillars supporting a timber first floor. The upper storey also had an open plan with the only opening for loading being a pair of sliding doors facing East Lane. The roof had 5 sky-lights and was constructed of king-post trusses with hips at both ends.

The warehouse was constructed with the intention of dividing the ground Derby Street frontage into 9 shops at any given time by removing the brickwork between the pilasters, although there is no evidence that this ever occurred.

GS Curtis became insolvent in November 1898 and his affairs were liquidated. The property was transferred to Mount Morgan trustee Thomas Skarrat Hall in December 1898 and at the time of his death in June 1903, was again transferred to trustees. In 1918 the stores were purchased by Denham Bros of Rockhampton. The building was purchased by the current owners in 1973.

== Description ==
The former GS Curtis Stores, a long narrow two-storeyed rendered masonry structure with a hipped gable roof concealed behind a parapet, is located fronting Derby Street to the southeast between Bolsover Street and East Lane. The building is located at the western edge of the warehouse precinct located around the former Rockhampton wharves.

The building has splayed entrance bays to both street corners, and the Derby Street elevation contains nine bays framed by pilasters. The first floor contains a continuous row of arched, louvred glass windows separated by pilasters and framed with rendered mouldings and sills. These windows establish the rhythm of the bays which alternate in width, with the wider bays consisting of three arched windows and the narrower bays of two arched windows. Each narrow bay is surmounted by a rendered arched moulding with central circle motif. The end bays also have similar circle mouldings located above the arched windows. The building has a parapet with corbelled cornice, and raised arched mouldings are aligned with the position of the bays. The ground floor has a single arched louvred glass window with recessed lower panel, flanked by rendered circle mouldings and raised string course, centrally positioned within each wide bay. A tall loading door is located within each narrow bay, consisting of a roller door to the lower section surmounted by timber louvres and fixed glazing.

The splayed corner entrance bays have similar detailing, and comprise paired timber doors with an arched fanlight to the ground floor, with an arched louvred glass window to the first floor.

The narrow Bolsover Street elevation is similar in detail, consisting of an arched central bay containing two arched louvred glass first floor windows, flanked by a single arched window either side. The ground floor has an arched louvred glass window to the central bay flanked by rendered circle mouldings and raised string course, with an arched window on the southern side and an arched infilled doorway on the northern side. The rendered detailing suggests that the building was designed to allow it to be extended along the Bolsover Street frontage.

The East Lane elevation has similar parapet detailing, but the rendered facade details finish at the edge of the splayed corner entrance. This elevation is finished in painted brickwork, and the ground floor has a single opening with timber louvres and fixed glazing, with evidence of brick infill of an earlier loading door below. A brick infilled arched doorway is located adjacent. The first floor has a loading door, consisting of a roller door to the lower section surmounted by timber louvres, and a smaller louvred glass window is located adjacent.

Internally, the building has eight centrally positioned cast iron columns supporting a timber framed first floor. The ground floor has a mostly open plan, with a concrete floor and painted brick walls, with the rear wall having infilled centrally positioned window openings to each bay. The northeast end has a concrete mezzanine floor supported by concrete block walls, with partitioned offices and store rooms below. A hoist is located adjacent, and a steel staircase is located at the northern corner. The first floor has an open plan, with a concrete floor at the northern end above the mezzanine, and the ceiling is lined with compressed sheeting.

== Heritage listing ==
GS Curtis Stores was listed on the Queensland Heritage Register on 21 October 1992 having satisfied the following criteria.

The place is important in demonstrating the evolution or pattern of Queensland's history.

The former GS Curtis Stores represents the beginning of a period of substantial commercial development in Rockhampton during the latter 19th century. The warehouse, the second oldest surviving in Rockhampton, was built in what was to become a precinct of large warehouses situated near the trading activity of the river wharves. It reflected the prosperity of Rockhampton and its position as the premier commercial centre and port of central Queensland at a time when it was benefiting from the wealth of gold mining at Mount Morgan from the 1880s to the turn of the century.

The place is important because of its aesthetic significance.

The building, a two-storeyed warehouse structure, has considerable street presence due to its long, decorative Derby Street elevation. The building's form, fabric, materials and distinctive detailing illustrate a creative design approach. The building is recognised as a local landmark and makes a significant contribution to the Rockhampton streetscape and townscape.

The place has a strong or special association with a particular community or cultural group for social, cultural or spiritual reasons.

The building has a special association for the people of Rockhampton as an historical landmark which contributes to the image of the city.

The place has a special association with the life or work of a particular person, group or organisation of importance in Queensland's history.

It has special association with prominent Rockhampton architect John William Wilson who, during his 35-year practice, contributed largely to the townscape of Rockhampton in the late 19th century. It also has special association with George Silas Curtis MLA as a manifestation of his enterprises which were important to the development of Rockhampton. Curtis was a prominent member of Rockhampton's early community and a vigorous supporter of the separation movement who influenced the history of the city and the region.
