= Heber Hedley Booth =

Australian poet

- An older Heber H. Booth
- Born: 2 June 1864; Brisbane, Queensland, Australia
- Died: 9 August 1936 (aged 72); Brisbane, Queensland, Australia
- Occupations: Post office employee, poet
- Spouse: Harriett Elizabeth de Gruchy (–1931)

Heber Hedley Booth (2 June 1864 – 9 August 1936) was a Queensland-based Australian poet who wrote under the nom de plume Opal, known principally for his inaugural anthology Opalodes (1909). His poems made much reference to the locations of northern Australia, although several involved political comment of actions at the time. Booth's writings covered the early Federation of Australia from a Queensland perspective, possibly influenced by the earlier 1890s Central Queensland Territorial Separation League and the ongoing North Queensland separation movements.

== Personal life ==
Heber Hedley Booth was one of four surviving children of Ernest Hardwick Booth (d. 1915) and Mary Annie Wilcox (d. 1896). Ernest served as chair for a gold mine, was later an auctioneer, although was insolvent by 1898. Brother James went on to become a surgeon based in Melbourne, and later president of the Australian Literary Society.

First educated at Gympie on a scholarship, he spent three years at the Brisbane Grammar School, before being employed at fifteen years-of-age with the postal service as a telegraphist at Greenmount, near Toowoomba in 1879. Following Greenmount, he was posted to Rockhampton from 1882 to 1898.

On 30 January 1895, Booth married Harriett Elizabeth de Gruchy, the daughter of John William de Gruchy and Isabella Leslie, of Highfields, Toowoomba. Her father was from Jersey, Channel Islands, and a mother from Dublin, Ireland. Harriett was born in Toowoomba. He was later chosen to take charge of the telegraph station at Junction Creek near Georgetown. Harriett found herself as the only non-indigenous woman in the area for over six months. In July 1900, Booth was transferred to Ingham.

His postmaster postings formed his poems: Boulia, Cooktown, Maytown, Palmer, Richmond, Springsure, Thornborough, Burketown (1903–1908), Normanton (1908–1909), Cloncurry (1911), Proserpine (1912–1923), Paddington (1925), and Kilcoy (1925). After fifty years of employment, Booth retired from the post and telegraph department in Kilcoy in 1929, and he and his wife moved to Redcliffe.

Booth was a member of the Queensland Authors and Artists' Association, as well as the Brisbane Chess Club.

His wife Harriett, aged 67, died on 19 January 1931 at Saint Helen's Private Hospital, Peel Street, South Brisbane, and was interred at the Toowong Cemetery. Later he moved in as a boarder with former Brisbane socialite and Girl Guides leader, and The Telegraph journalist Phoebe Edith Kingsnorth 'Aunt Jo' Kirwan (1896–1989) at Moggill Road, Taringa, Brisbane. After a long illness Booth died on 9 August 1936, and cremated at the Mount Thompson Crematorium. Kirwan was nominated as the executor of his will.

== Poetry ==
It was once opined that Booth, unlike other Queensland poets of the time including James Brunton Stephens (1835–1902) and George Essex Evans (1863–1909), was a Queenslander by birth. Booth's pen name Opal was an association with his State of origin, Queensland; although he had written under Haidee previously. Due to his movement through the State due to his employment, many of his poems referred to northern Australia.

Through his first posting to Greenmount Booth met lifelong friend Arthur Hoey Davis (1868–1935), better known as the author Steele Rudd. Rudyard Kipling appeared to have influenced the Queensland poet in some of his writings, while it was indicated he borrowed from George Meredith and Longfellow, and even Henry Lawson. Booth's poems were published under his pen name in the Australian newspapers.

The release of his anthology was considered to be a mixture of 'the gay and the serious' with 'no definite style in the verses'. Opalodes: Patriotic and miscellaneous verses, dedicated to his wife, was printed by Powell and Company in Brisbane, Queensland, Australia in August 1909, priced at two shillings and sixpence (123 pages). Poems were given as of 'no particular literary quality, but they have in them a good swing and the embodiment of a patriotic hope'. One critique commented 'For Mr. Booth is content to publish some of the least metrical lines which ever passed for verse'. It has several divisions: 'Patriotic', 'Triolets' (an eight line poem with only two rhymes, in the form of 'ABxAxxAB'), and 'Breezes from the Gulf of Carpentaria'. Poems included 'The dawn of Federation', 'Edelweiss', 'Bereaved', 'Reincarnation', 'The ballad of the Burketown alligator', 'Trafalgar', 'The Australian Fleet', 'Estranged: A Gulfie's reverie', 'An Australian matron's challenge to the men of our Commonwealth', 'The great Gulf conference', 'Ballade of Gladstone (Queensland)', 'Queensland in 1902-03', 'Sunset on the Berserker Mountains', 'The young commander', 'Easter-tide', and 'To many a Queensland mate'. A number of comments contained political comment of proceedings of the time, such as the White Australia policy and 'The federal capital site through northern glasses'.

Heber H. Booth, date unknown

His patriotic efforts can be seen in 'Australia, our own' (third of five verses):

Ne'er before the world has seen,

Australia, Beloved!

Such a young and untried Queen,

Australia, Our Own,

Trusted with such ample sway
As is yours to wield always,
Through the blinding lightnings play
Round your ocean circled throne, Australia—
As we list to your bugles blown.

Several of Booth's poems were included in Louis Lataver's collection of the best Australian sonnets. After what became his only published anthology, Booth produced some more patriotic and other verses.

Reflecting his posting at the North Queensland sugar cane town, he wrote in 1913 (last two verses):

The scrubs were upriven, the plains were part cleared,
And soon happy homes o'er the landscape appeared,
While the serpentine river—a miniature Nile,
Saw the township of Proserpine born with a smile.

So Proserpine grows, scarce three leagues from the sea,
And twines round all hearts, for her welcome is free;
And the three thousand souls who no further would roam,
To thirty shall swell, who will love her as—"Home."

It was suggested that this type of 'conventional Australian verse... will probably win the wider public'.
