= John William Wilson (architect) =

John William Wilson was an architect and builder in Rockhampton, Queensland, Australia. A number of his buildings are now heritage-listed.

== Early life ==
Wilson had been born in Banff, Scotland in 1829. He migrated to Victoria where he became foreman in the Works Department. In 1854 he was at Bakery Hill in Ballarat, where he took part in the Eureka stockade riots. Wilson also laid claim to the design of the Southern Cross flag that flew over the Eureka stockade.

After his arrival in Rockhampton in 1864, Wilson worked as builder and operated a cargo boat along the Fitzroy River between Yaamba and Rockhampton. In July 1872, Wilson found a large salt water crocodile known as Big Ben dying in Alligator Creek (it had been shot). Big Ben had originally inhabited the lower reaches of the Fitzroy River but had been frightened by the shipping in the river and had retreated to Alligator Creek. In October that year, Wilson displayed Big Ben and some other crocodiles in Rockhampton's Theatre Royal. Big Ben was 23 feet 6 inches (7.16 m) long and an analysis of his stomach revealed human bones; local Aboriginal people had long believed Big Ben had eaten people and held a corroborree to celebrate his death.

== Architecture in Rockhampton ==
Wilson advertised as an architect from 1875. Wilson was responsible for the design of two hundred buildings in and around Rockhampton.

Wilson's work was recognised by the Daily Northern Argus:

During the last five or six years,...nothing in either stone or brick and mortar has reared its head above the ground, although a good deal of patching up work has been done, all of which has fallen into the hands of one architect Mr. J. W. Wilson who is...about the most practical man in the town in the profession... Amongst many of the jobs executed by him are those of the front of the Joint Stock Bank, a most creditable piece of work... We also understand that Mr. Wilson is the architect for Dr. Callaghan's new residence in Quay Street, adjoining the old "Argus" office. The patronage bestowed upon Mr. Wilson fully corroborates our prediction some two years since, that he was the right man in the right place.

== Later life ==
Wilson died at his home in West Street, Rockhampton on 3 February 1915.

== Significant works ==
Significant works designed by Wilson include:

- 1876: Trustee Chambers (former residence of Dr Callaghan), Rockhampton
- 1882: AMV Warehouse, Rockhampton
- 1890: Queensland National Hotel, Mount Morgan
- Rockhampton School of Arts
- Commercial Hotel and Chambers
- Cahill's Stores
- Harbour Board
- Leichhardt Hotel
