= Grace Perrier =

(1875-1979) librarian

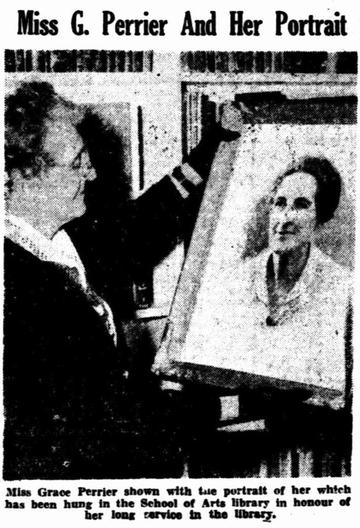
Grace Perrier with her portrait, 1953

Grace Perrier (18 November 1875 – 30 August 1979) was an Australian librarian who worked in library services in Rockhampton for more than 60 years; first at the Rockhampton School of Arts and then at the Rockhampton Regional Library.

== Biography ==
Perrier was born in Rockhampton, in Queensland, and was the third of eleven children born to her parents Henry Perrier and his wife Ellen (née Brenan). Her family were Catholic and she attended to local Catholic school, St Brigid's Convent of Mercy school.

On 6 November 1889, after completing her schooling, Perrier started working as a junior library assistant at the Rockhampton School of Arts. There she was trained and mentored by its scholarly librarian N.M.M. Davidson. Despite her lack of formal training Perrier was promoted to assistant-librarian in 1926.

The Rockhampton City Council took over the library services role of the School of Arts on 1 July 1947 and Perrier became the head of the library service. Despite the many years of experience her lack of qualifications meant that she was replaced by a formally qualified librarian in 1950.

She retired on 11 September 1952 and, at a public meeting, she was made an honorary life member of the library. A plaque was also placed in the library to commemorate her service alongside a portrait of her. The local paper wrote of her retirement:

There are very few among us who will not notice the absence of Miss Grace Perrier from the Municipal Library. In her 52 years of faithful service she has acted as a wise guide and a good friend to readers of all ages, and contact with her cheerful presence and ready sense of humour made the choice of reading matter a thorough pleasure.

— Sheelagh, Social Chat, 13 September 1952, Morning Bulletin (Rockhampton)

In addition to her paid work Perrier was also a foundation member of the Rockhampton and District Historical Society when it formed in 1948 and served as its honorary librarian from 1955 to 1968.

She died, aged 103, on 30 August 1979 in Rockhampton.
