= Felix Clewett =

The Hon Felix Clewett
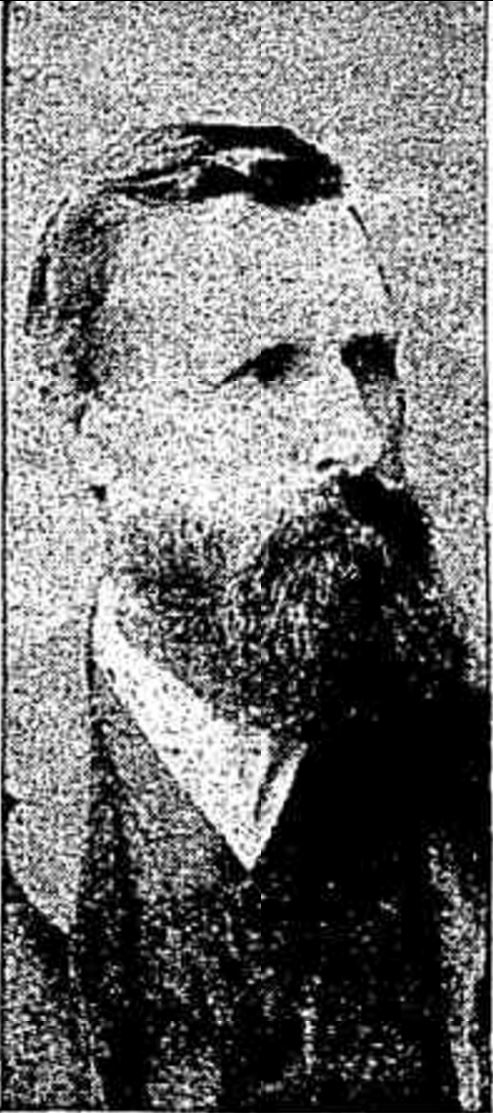
- Felix Clewett

Member of the Queensland Legislative Council
- In office 30 July 1890 – 13 February 1913

Personal details
- Born: Felix Clewett; 10 March 1836 Sydney, New South Wales, Australia
- Died: 13 February 1913 (aged 76) Brisbane, Queensland, Australia
- Resting place: Toowong Cemetery
- Spouse: Isabella Jane Cox (m.1869 d.1893)

Felix Clewett (10 March 1836 – 13 February 1913) was a member of the Queensland Legislative Council.

== Early life ==
Clewett was born in Sydney, New South Wales to George Clewett and his wife Ann (née Curtis) and educated at St. James's Grammar School, Sydney. In 1867, Clewett had married Isabella Jane Cox and together they had five children.

== Politics ==
Clewett was appointed to the Queensland Legislative Council in July 1890 and served for over twenty-two years till his death in February 1913.

== Later life ==
He died in 1913, and was buried in Toowong Cemetery.
