= Heritage Hotel, Rockhampton =

Heritage Hotel
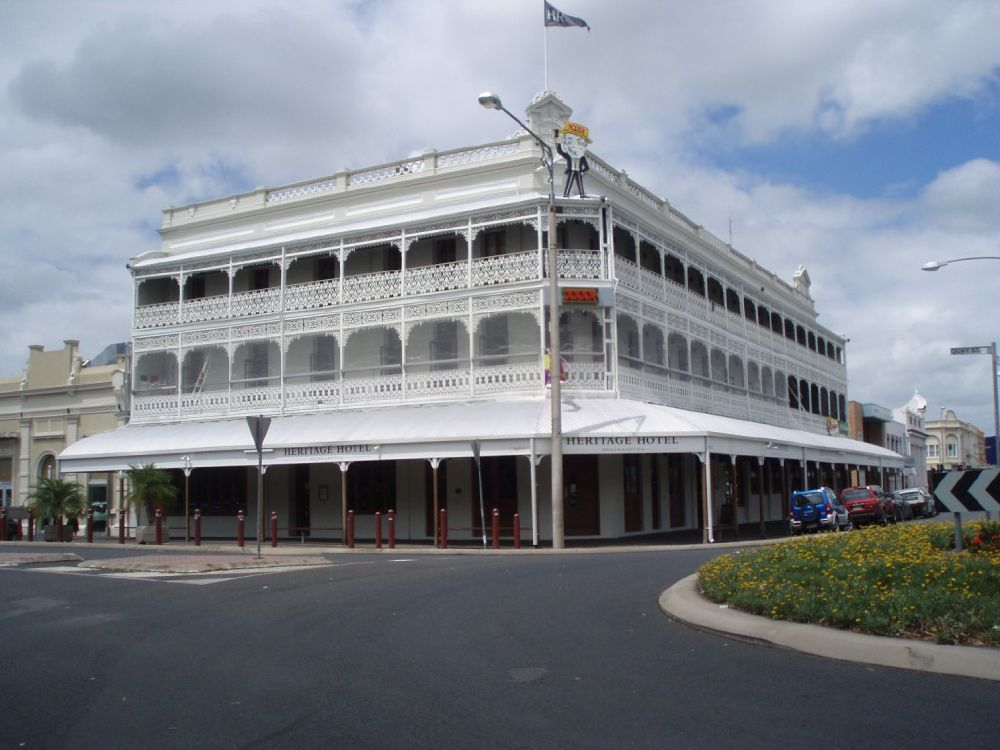
- Heritage Hotel (formerly Commercial Hotel and Chambers), 2009

- Location within Queensland Location within Australia
- 23.3797°S 150.5155°E
- Location: 230 Quay Street, Rockhampton, Rockhampton Region, Queensland, Australia

History
- Design period: 1870s–1890s (late 19th century)
- Built: 1898

Site notes
- Architect: John William Wilson

Queensland Heritage Register
- Official name: Commercial Hotel and Chambers (former)
- Type: state heritage (built)
- Designated: 21 October 1992
- Reference no.: 600810
- Significant period: 1890s (fabric); 1898–ongoing (historical use)
- Significant components: roof deck/terrace/promenade
- Builders: John Kerslake Evans

The Heritage Hotel is a heritage-listed hotel at 230 Quay Street, Rockhampton, Rockhampton Region, Queensland, Australia. It was designed by John William Wilson and built in 1898 by John Kerslake Evans. It is also known as the Old Colonial Hotel and the Commercial Hotel. It was added to the Queensland Heritage Register on 21 October 1992.

== History ==
The Heritage Hotel, formerly the Old Colonial Hotel and originally the Commercial Hotel and Chambers, was erected in 1898 for Leah Johnson. Designed by prominent Rockhampton architect John William Wilson, the three-storey, concrete-rendered brick building featuring decorative iron-lace verandah balustrading was constructed by John Kerslake Evans at a cost of £6,500.

The Heritage Hotel is situated immediately opposite the wharves of the Fitzroy River, in the heart of Rockhampton's premier commercial district. From the 1850s, and especially in the latter part of the 19th century, the area around Quay Street attracted solid development, impressive new construction, which was fostered by the commercial activity the wharves brought to the quayside.

The Port of Rockhampton was proclaimed in 1868 with the discovery of gold at Canoona and became influential in establishing Rockhampton as the premier commercial city of central Queensland, handling the pastoral and mineral products, which came increasingly from the hinterland. The Commercial Hotel and Chambers building was a part of the confident commercial pattern of development that distinguished Quay Street in this period.

The substantial nature of development around the Quay Street precinct was also influenced by the immense wealth injected into Rockhampton from the Mount Morgan Gold Mine, discovered in 1882. Mount Morgan was the single richest gold mine in the world and its economic impact on the port city of Rockhampton was expressed through the confident and stylistic character of its principal business district on Quay Street. The period of development was also distinguished by the separation movement, which agitated for Rockhampton to be made the capital of a separate northern state. The erection of prestigious buildings, such as the Commercial Hotel and Chambers, reflected the notion of rivalry with the capital of Brisbane and was held as a great boon to the cause of separation.

Owner Leah Johnson was a well-known hostess in the Rockhampton hotel industry. With then husband Timothy Dean, the Welsh-born Leah Dean arrived in Rockhampton in 1871. The couple operated the Melbourne Hotel and an earlier Commercial Hotel until Timothy Dean's death in 1879. Leah Johnson ran hotels in Mackay and Charters Towers until the death of her second husband, H Johnson. After returning to Rockhampton, Leah Johnson owned the Royal and the Oxford Arms hotels before construction commenced on the Commercial Hotel and Chambers.

Situated at the corner of William and Quay Streets, the site was well placed for a hotel. William James operated the Golden Fleece Hotel there from 1859. After many changes of hands the licence had expired and the building was vacant until Leah Johnson purchased the site in June 1890. Construction of the new Commercial Hotel and Chambers commenced in May 1898. With forty-six bedrooms, all of which either faced onto a verandah overlooking the street or an internal courtyard, the hotel opened for business on 2 November 1898.

Johnson's Commercial Hotel and Chambers evidenced the self-sufficiency the city displayed against the influences of the state capital, Brisbane. Rockhampton architect John William Wilson was responsible for the hotel's grand, balconied design. From early 1870 to 1915 Wilson designed over 200 buildings for the central Queensland region. Six to ten of them were located in the historic precinct of Quay Street, and approximately 30 of varying types stood within a three-block radius of the Commercial Hotel. Wilson was born in Banffshire in Scotland, emigrated to Australia shortly before 1854 and began his architectural career in Victoria before moving to Rockhampton and practicing there for about 35 years.

The local foundry firm Burns and Twigg manufactured the iron lace, so prominent a feature of the hotel's verandahs. Founded in March 1875 by engineer William Burns and pattern maker Edward F. Twigg, by 1900 the company employed over one hundred men and supplied engineering services throughout central and north-west Queensland.

The fine handcrafted cedar doors and window sashes fitted into the former Commercial Hotel were completed by the joinery firm founded by Walter Adam Lawson. At the time of its opening the furniture and fittings were obtained locally from such firms as James Stewart & Co., Williams and Graham, and W Kasch. The internal fittings also included a kitchen range manufactured by Burns and Twigg. The hotel's pottery, with its name stamped in each piece, was procured from Mr James Millroy of Liverpool House.

In line with commercial expansion throughout the region, the Commercial Hotel provided six ground-floor "sample rooms" facing William Street, which could be used by commercial travellers to display their goods. Other attributes were a commodious bar, a parlour, sitting and dining rooms, as well as a family dining room. For meetings the second floor featured a clubroom connected to the bar by a speaking tube and lift. An article published in a local newspaper The Record on the day of the Hotel's opening describes a promenade flat on the top of the building that was reached by staircase and provided a view of Rockhampton and environs. Also, a 1906 photograph of the hotel shows there was a vaulted gable on the William Street footpath canopy that marked the point of entry to the accommodation levels above. This photo also reveals that the solid parapet panels facing William and Quay Streets were each topped by pediments.

The hotel was inundated during a flood in 1918.

Following the death of Leah Johnson in 1923, the Commercial Hotel and Chambers continued to operate under various owners until the 1970s when it was known as the Old Colonial Hotel. Parts of the hotel were modernised in the late 1970s in conjunction with its renaming as the Heritage Hotel.

The hotel closed on 11 March 2015 after the business went into receivership, the owners citing the impact of drought, downturns in the coal industry and Cyclone Marcia as reasons for its demise. The building subsequently sold at auction for $1.4 million on 13 November 2015.

The hotel was renovated under new ownership in 2016–17 and reopened in June 2017.

== Description ==
The Heritage Hotel is located on the prominent corner of Quay and William Streets in the heart of Rockhampton's Central Business District. Quay Street, overlooking the Fitzroy River, was recognised as a streetscape of historical significance in the Australian Heritage Commission's Register of the National Estate. The Queensland Heritage Register features numerous other listings for this area, including the former Cahill Stores and the Mount Morgan Gold Mining Company Building, both of which are adjacent to the hotel to the south-east. Across William Street to north-west is Rockhampton's central pedestrian mall. Running along the short, south- western edge of the allotment is Quay Lane, which forms part of a system of such laneways inhabiting the city centre's orthogonal grid and servicing its primary streets.

A largely three-storey brick building, the former Commercial Hotel and Chambers is a visually striking example of late 19th century commercial architecture. The upper two storeys of its street facades are encased by verandahs decorated with elaborate cast-iron work, the outer edges of which sit in line with the street facades below. The Quay and William Street facades are approximately 20 and 40 metres (66 and 131 ft) long respectively. A two-storey rectangle of building occupies the rear, south-west corner of the 809-square-metre (8,710 sq ft) allotment and houses the hotel's service areas. The Quay and William Street footpaths are covered by a curved canopy, which sits atop a broad fascia line and regularly spaced square timber posts decorated with carved timber brackets. The steel framing is exposed on the underside of this roof. Greatly altered over the life of the building, the ground floor street facades currently comprise aluminium-framed glazing separated by wall areas finished with ceramic tiles and an upper band finished with render. The roofs to the main building and the street canopy are clad in corrugated iron.

Painted bricks are visible on the exposed facades to Quay Lane and the adjoining property. The tops of the building facing Quay and William Streets are finished with a parapet modelled using cement render. At the main north-eastern corner, a raised parapet piece topped with an open-bed pediment features the name "Commercial Hotel". On either side of this projection the parapets consist of open, circle-patterned balustrading, to the top and bottom of which are string courses. On Quay Street this is closed at the adjoining property boundary by a solid parapet panel. The open balustrading is finished with a similar panel on the William Street facade, and broken in the middle by a solid panel reading "1897". These two panels, unlike their Quay Street counterpart, are topped with simply modeled pediments. Beneath the lower string course the parapet render reveals some narrow rectangles of brick. A rooftop promenade, behind the parapet line, remains and still provides a magnificent view of Rockhampton city and the surrounding country.

The components of the cast-iron work decorating the verandahs are fixed to a frame of square timber posts and beams. At the corner of the building there are double posts. Single baluster, frieze and fringe panels fit between the posts, as do timber handrails. The fringe panels are formed together with the brackets fixing to each post. Walls projecting approximately 20 centimetres (7.9 in) above the line of the roof enclose the verandahs at the adjoining property on Quay Street and to Quay Lane on William Street. The floors to the verandahs appear to be finished with concrete. There is exposed framing to the underside of the verandah floors and roofs. Off the corner room on the first storey open a number of large double-hung sash windows (sill level with floor) with awning windows above. Off the other rooms (accommodation) open timber-framed french doors with awning windows above. A single flight of stairs at the western end of the William Street verandah connects the two upper levels.

Bar, dining and other entertainment facilities occupy the ground floor, while accommodation facilities occupy the upper two storeys facing Quay and William Streets. The upper accommodation levels can be accessed off William Street by a flight of stairs with polished timber handrails and paneling to the walls. The vaulted gable on the William Street footpath canopy, which once marked the entry to the accommodation levels above, no longer exists. The public bar area is still located at the ground floor corner of the building. In 2003, there are 24 rooms with shared modern facilities available. In each room a single wall with English Bond brickwork has been exposed. The long corridors into which the accommodation rooms open, are lined on the ceiling and walls with tongue and groove timber boards approximately 10 centimetres (3.9 in) wide. The doors opening into these rooms have timber frames and large pivoted highlights.

== Heritage listing ==
The Heritage Tavern was listed on the Queensland Heritage Register on 21 October 1992 having satisfied the following criteria.

The place is important in demonstrating the evolution or pattern of Queensland's history.

The Heritage Tavern is important in illustrating the evolution of Queensland's history because it provides evidence of the confidence in the future of Rockhampton, which the city's commercial interests expressed in the late 19th century. The quality and luxury of hostelry services provided by the Commercial Hotel supported the view that Rockhampton was an important city financially and regionally, a key argument in the movement for secession at the time. The quality and detail of its built fabric, constructed by local firms using local materials, visibly challenged the notion that only in the capital city of Brisbane was the best and latest to be found.

The place is important in demonstrating the principal characteristics of a particular class of cultural places.

The Heritage Tavern is important in illustrating the principal characteristics of the late 19th century hotel. In a prominent corner location and of substantial masonry construction, the building features bars below and upper-level guest rooms and verandahs. The intricate ironwork balustrading, essentially intact today, establishes the building as a notable example of the use of iron filigree in hotel architecture.

The place is important because of its aesthetic significance.

As well as this individual importance, the building contributes to both the integrity and aesthetic value of the overall Quay Street streetscape.

The place has a special association with the life or work of a particular person, group or organisation of importance in Queensland's history.

The Heritage Tavern has a special association with the life and work of two well-known Rockhampton identities: Leah Johnson who commissioned the building in the late 1890s, and John W. Wilson, the prolific Rockhampton architect who designed more than 200 buildings in central Queensland over a period of thirty-five years.
