= Rockhampton Harbour Board Building =

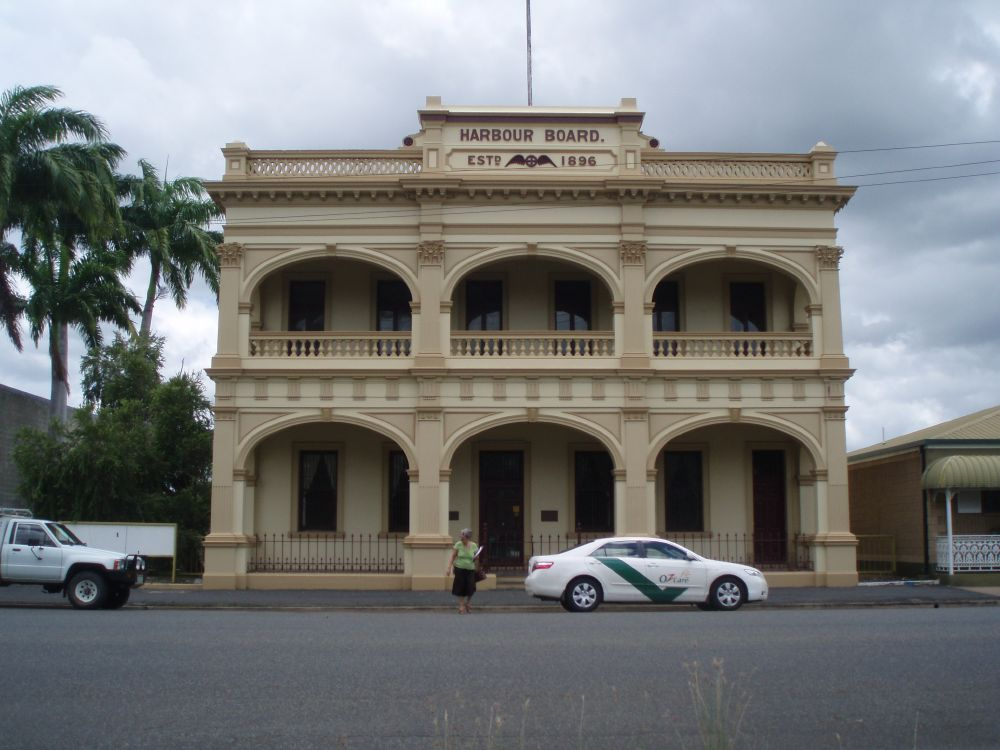
- Rockhampton Harbour Board Building, 2009

- Location within Queensland Location within Australia
- 23.3822°S 150.5173°E
- Location: 288 Quay Street, Rockhampton, Rockhampton Region, Queensland, Australia

History
- Design period: 1870s–1890s (late 19th century)
- Built: 1898–1898

Site notes
- Architect: John William Wilson
- Architectural style: Classicism

Queensland Heritage Register
- Official name: Harbour Board (former), Fitzroy Shire Council Chambers
- Type: state heritage (built)
- Designated: 21 October 1992
- Reference no.: 600816
- Significant period: 1890s (fabric); 1890s–1970s (historical)
- Significant components: plaque, office/administration building, memorial – plaque
- Builders: Renshaw & Ricketts

Rockhampton Harbour Board Building is a heritage-listed office building at 288 Quay Street, Rockhampton, Rockhampton Region, Queensland, Australia. It was designed by John William Wilson and built in 1898 by Renshaw & Ricketts. It is also known as Fitzroy Shire Council Chambers. It was added to the Queensland Heritage Register on 21 October 1992.

== History ==
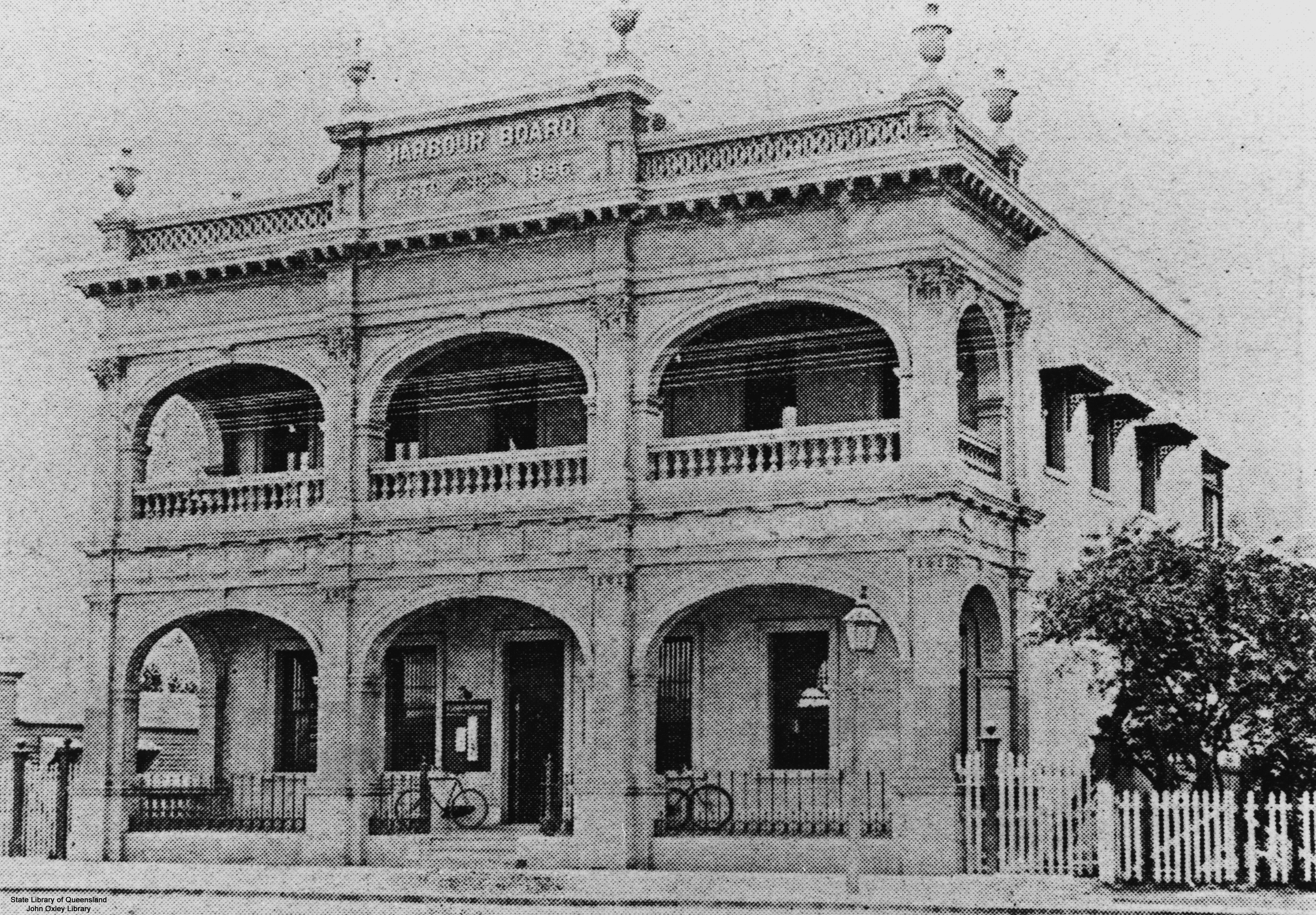
Rockhampton Harbour Board Building, 1899

The former Harbour Board Building was erected in 1898 for the newly established Harbour Board of Rockhampton. The former Harbour Board building was designed by John William Wilson and built by Renshaw & Ricketts for £3,200. The Harbour Board was the authority for the Port of Rockhampton from 1896 until 1979 and operated in the Quay Street building from 1898 to 1977. The erection of the prestigious Harbour Board offices in Quay Street reflected the significance of the port of Rockhampton and the wealth of trade it brought to the city during the late 19th century.

Rockhampton was declared a Port of Entry on 8 October 1858 following the influx of gold seekers to Canoona. The port served a vast area of Central Queensland, supported by a network of roads which brought the exports of gold, copper, hides, tallow and wool from the hinterland in the 1860s. In 1867 the Central Western railway line was established westward from Rockhampton which increased the flow of goods through the port. The port was influential in establishing Rockhampton as the major trade and communication centre of the region and its operation soon became a vital commodity in Rockhampton's economy.

The Rockhampton Harbour Board was established in 1895 by the Rockhampton Harbour Board Act and assumed authority for the Port of Rockhampton in January 1896. The Queensland Government had passed the Harbour Board Act of 1892 in an attempt to decentralise and offload the expense of maintaining Queensland ports due to the financial downturn of the depression. The Harbour Board Act provided for the establishment of Harbour Boards at any Port where there was enough shipping trade to ensure the individual Harbour Boards were self- supporting.

The Rockhampton Harbour Board was among the first three boards to be established in 1895 together with Townsville and Bundaberg. Within the next 20 years Harbour Boards were established at Mackay (1896), Cairns (1905), Gladstone (1913) and Bowen (1914). The Harbour Boards assumed work formerly carried out by the Marine Department, Customs Department, Shipping Agencies and the Municipal Council. However, control of the tidal waters remained with the Crown and provision of pilotage and navigation remained under the control of the Marine Department. In spite of this, the principle of local control was applied by the Act. To allow it to function, a Board was granted tenure over port lands for the purpose of wharfage or port purposes, and the power to levy harbour dues on all goods discharched or shipped within the harbour, together with the right to lease land and facilities to provide funds for the Board's responsibilities of wharf construction, dredging and provision of other ports needs.

The Rockhampton Harbour Board building was constructed in 1898 and was part of the prestigious development which occurred along Quay Street from the 1860s to the turn of the century. The erection of this grand two-storied masonry building reflected the particular wealth of the Rockhampton Harbour Board which was a manifestation of the prominence of the port.

Tenders for the erection of the building were called by John W Wilson in March 1897. Wilson dominated the architectural scene in Rockhampton from 1864 until the 1890s. His work contributed significantly to the consistency of the Rockhampton townscape with six of the Quay Street buildings erected before 1901 being Wilson's design. Wilson designed over 200 buildings in the central Queensland region during his 35-year practice and was one of the most prominent and prolific architects to have worked in Rockhampton. The Harbour Board stands as one of his most striking designs.

The foundations of the building were described as "particularly strong" and were allowed to stand for a month before construction of the building continued in regard to the structural problems resulting from moving foundations experienced with other Rockhampton buildings. The former Harbour Board building is one of few Rockhampton buildings from its period which does not possess major cracking caused by foundation movement.

Externally the building is substantially intact, with the decorative colonnaded facade fronting Quay Street. The rear of the building has been markedly altered with an extension replacing the original rear verandah. Internally, the brickwork walls were originally plastered with Portland's cement and finished with Keen's cement. On the ground floor the space for the public and private offices is still evident with its original cedar mouldings and doors. The service counter originally curved towards the rear of the building.

The building was purchased by the Fitzroy Shire Council in 1977 and was used as offices until 1995. The building was purchased by the present private owner in February 1995.

== Description ==
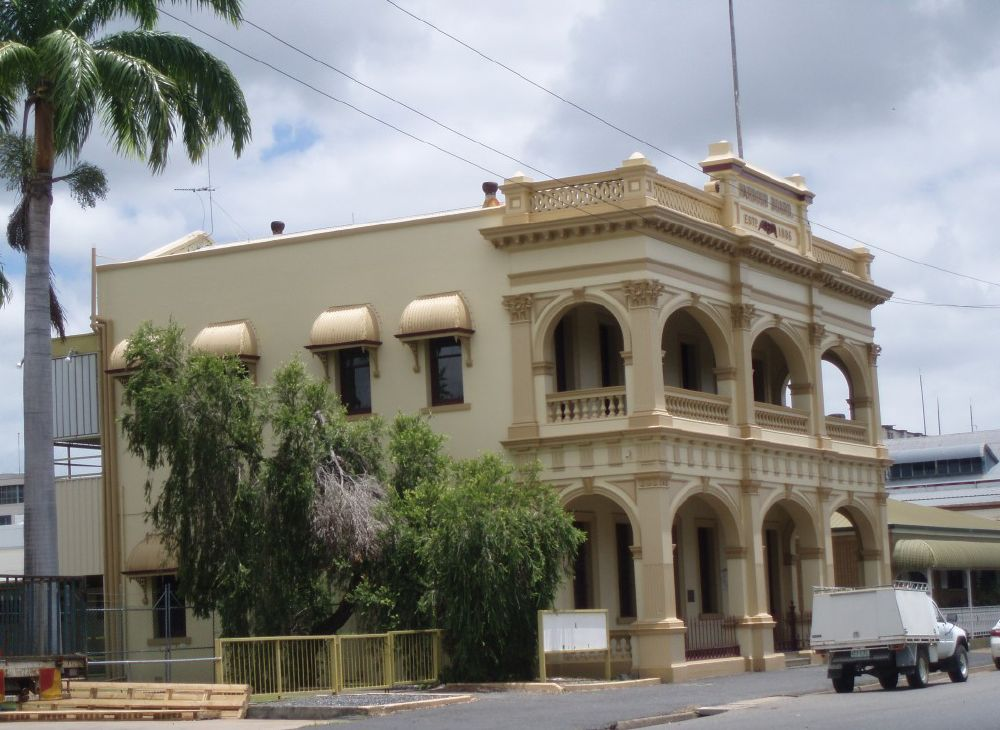
Harbour Board Building from the north-east, 2009

The former Harbour Board building, a two-storeyed rendered masonry structure, is located fronting Quay Street to the northeast overlooking the Fitzroy River. The building has a twin gable roof, the front section of which is hipped with central box gutter draining to the rear.

The Quay Street elevation has an arcaded colonnade to the ground floor and balcony to the first floor, each of which consists of three elliptical arches separated by pilasters supporting an entablature. The ground floor is designed in the Roman Doric order, and the first floor in the Corinthian order. Each arch has expressed mouldings, including imposts and keystones.

The ground floor pilasters have a deep pedestal, fluting to the lower section of the shaft, and rosettes to the neck of the capital. The entablature has expressed triglyphs and a shallow cornice, and a low cast iron balustrade with central paired entry gates and newel posts is located between the arches. The first floor pilasters have fluting to the entire shaft, and Corinthian order capitals. The entablature has expressed modillions to the deep cornice, which is surmounted by a parapet concealing the roof, and a rendered balustrade is located between the arches. The parapet has a raised central section which is framed by corner pillars flanking a perforated ring course. The central section is surmounted by a flagpole, and has the name HARBOUR BOARD ESTD 1896 in relief lettering framing a winged motif.

The ground floor colonnade has an encaustic tiled floor and curved rendered ceiling. Entry to the ground floor is via an off-set central paired timber panelled entry door, with entry to the first floor located at the northern end of the colonnade. Tall sash windows open onto the colonnade, and window and door openings have rendered architraves and sills, and security bars have been affixed. An engraved First World War memorial marble plaque is affixed to the colonnade wall, together with two metal plaques commemorating the use of the building by the Rockhampton Harbour Board and the Fitzroy Shire Council. The first floor balcony has a painted concrete floor and timber boarded ceiling, and French doors with fanlights open from the front rooms. The Quay Street elevation detailing returns the width of the colonnade and balcony either end of the building.

The southeast elevation has sash windows to the ground and first floors, each with a curved corrugated iron window hood supported by cast iron brackets, and security bars have been affixed to the ground floor windows. The northwest elevation, treated in a similar manner, has no windows to the ground floor.

The rear of the building has a first floor steel framed verandah surmounting the junction of a single-storeyed rear wing, constructed of concrete blocks with a ribbed metal roof, which replaced the original verandah. The rear wall of the building has a twin gabled parapet, with central arched ventilation panels. The first floor verandah has vertical louvres above the balustrade, and French doors and sash windows open from the rear rooms. The northern end of the verandah has been enclosed, and a narrow addition containing toilets has been attached.

Internally, the building has rendered masonry structural walls and timber partition walls, with cedar architraves, skirtings and cornices, however several of the internal doors have been removed. The ground floor contains three offices on the southern side, a large central room, and stair and strongroom on the northern side. The central room has a large carved timber reception counter at the front, and the name FITZROY SHIRE COUNCIL is inset in the vinyl tiled floor to the entrance. This room has a central cast iron column and timber boarded ceiling, and a dumb-waiter has been installed adjacent to the strongroom. Exposed air conditioning ducts have been installed, with ducts penetrating window and fanlight openings. The stair to the first floor has a cedar newel post and handrail, with turned cedar balusters to the first floor.

The first floor has similar finishes to the ground floor, however most of the panelled cedar doors are extant. Two rooms and a hallway front the Quay Street balcony, all with access via French doors, and the southern room has a suspended acoustic tiled ceiling. A large opening has been inserted in the timber partition wall adjacent to the stair landing, and the southwest room has been subdivided by the insertion of lower partition walls.

The rear wing contains offices and service rooms, and the property is accessed by a driveway on the southern side of the site which exits to Quay Lane at the rear.

== Heritage listing ==
The former Rockhampton Harbour Board Building was listed on the Queensland Heritage Register on 21 October 1992 having satisfied the following criteria.

The place is important in demonstrating the evolution or pattern of Queensland's history.

The former Harbour Board building erected in 1898 reflects the significance of the Port of Rockhampton which was influential in establishing the city as a major commercial centre of Queensland during the late nineteenth century. It also reflects a Queensland government initiative which saw the development of numerous Harbour Boards throughout the colony around the turn of the century to maintain and manage the ports of Queensland.

The place is important because of its aesthetic significance.

The former Harbour Board, located at the southern end of Quay Street but visually isolated from the quayside precinct, is recognised as a local landmark and makes a significant contribution to the Quay Street streetscape and Rockhampton townscape. The building is of architectural and aesthetic importance, and the form and fabric of the building illustrate a skilled design approach. The detailing of the materials and finishes exhibit fine quality craftsmanship.

The place has a strong or special association with a particular community or cultural group for social, cultural or spiritual reasons.

The former Harbour Board building has special association for the people of Rockhampton as an historical landmark of Quay Street which is closely associated with the image of the city.

The place has a special association with the life or work of a particular person, group or organisation of importance in Queensland's history.

The former Harbour Board building has special association with John W Wilson as one of his most prominent works. Wilson was a prolific architect in Rockhampton from 1864 to 1899 and designed about 200 buildings in the Rockhampton area.
