= Rockhampton School of Arts =

Heritage-listed building in Queensland, Australia

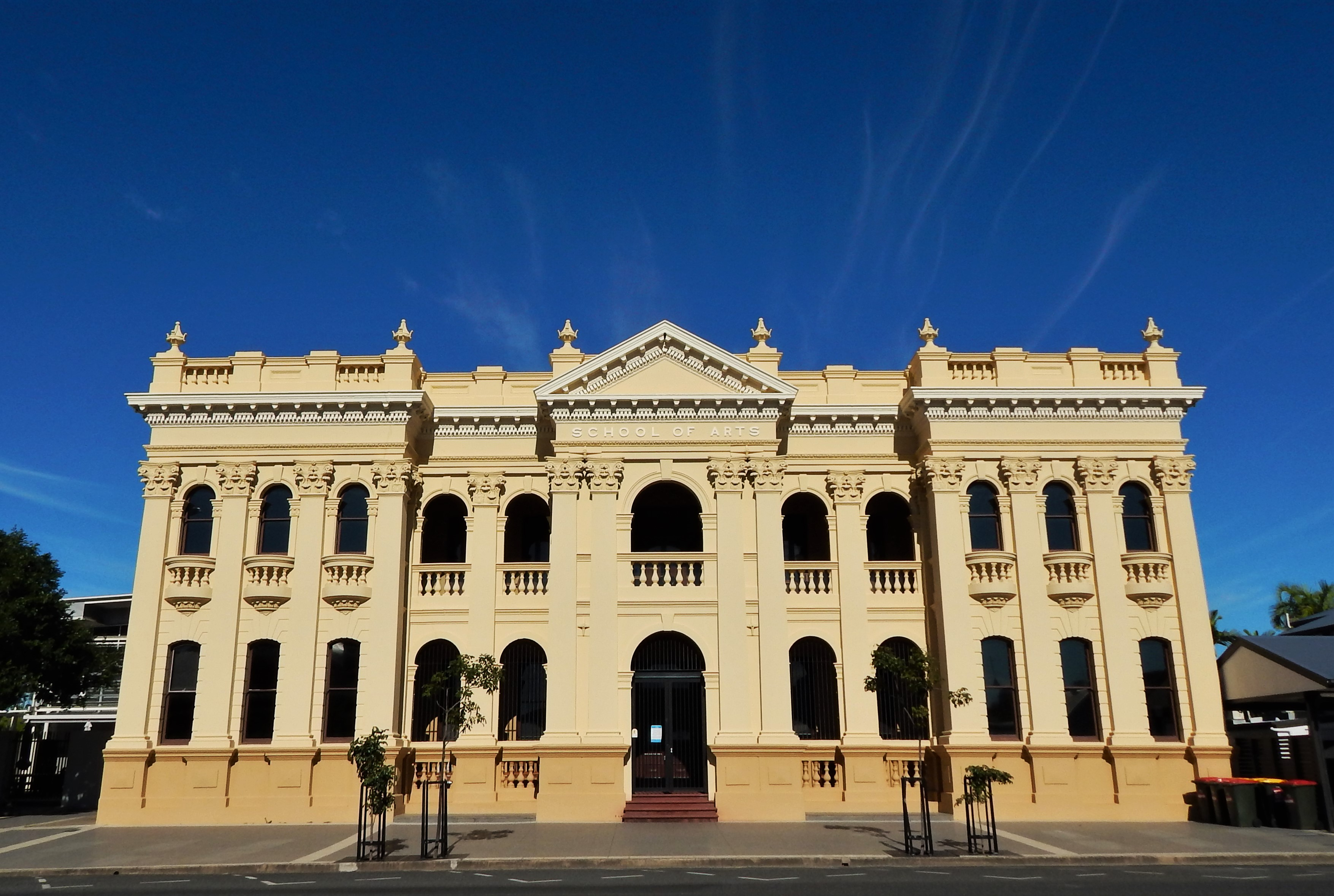
- Rockhampton School of Arts, 2020

- Location within Queensland Location within Australia
- 23.3815°S 150.5134°E
- Location: 230 Bolsover Street, Rockhampton City, Rockhampton, Rockhampton Region, Queensland, Australia

History
- Design period: 1870s–1890s (late 19th century)
- Built: 1894

Site notes
- Architect: Walter Cherry
- Architectural style: Classicism

Queensland Heritage Register
- Official name: Rockhampton School of Arts (former), Rockhampton Municipal Library, Rockhampton Municipal Theatre
- Type: state heritage (built)
- Designated: 21 October 1992
- Reference no.: 600788
- Significant period: 1890s–1900s (fabric); 1890s–1920s (historical); 1890s–1940s (social)
- Significant components: school of arts
- Builders: Walter Adam Lawson

Rockhampton School of Arts is a heritage-listed former school of arts at 230 Bolsover Street, Rockhampton City, Rockhampton, Rockhampton Region, Queensland, Australia. It was designed by William (Walter) Cherry built in 1894 by Walter Adam Lawson. It is also known as Rockhampton Regional Library and Rockhampton Municipal Theatre. It was added to the Queensland Heritage Register on 21 October 1992.

== History ==
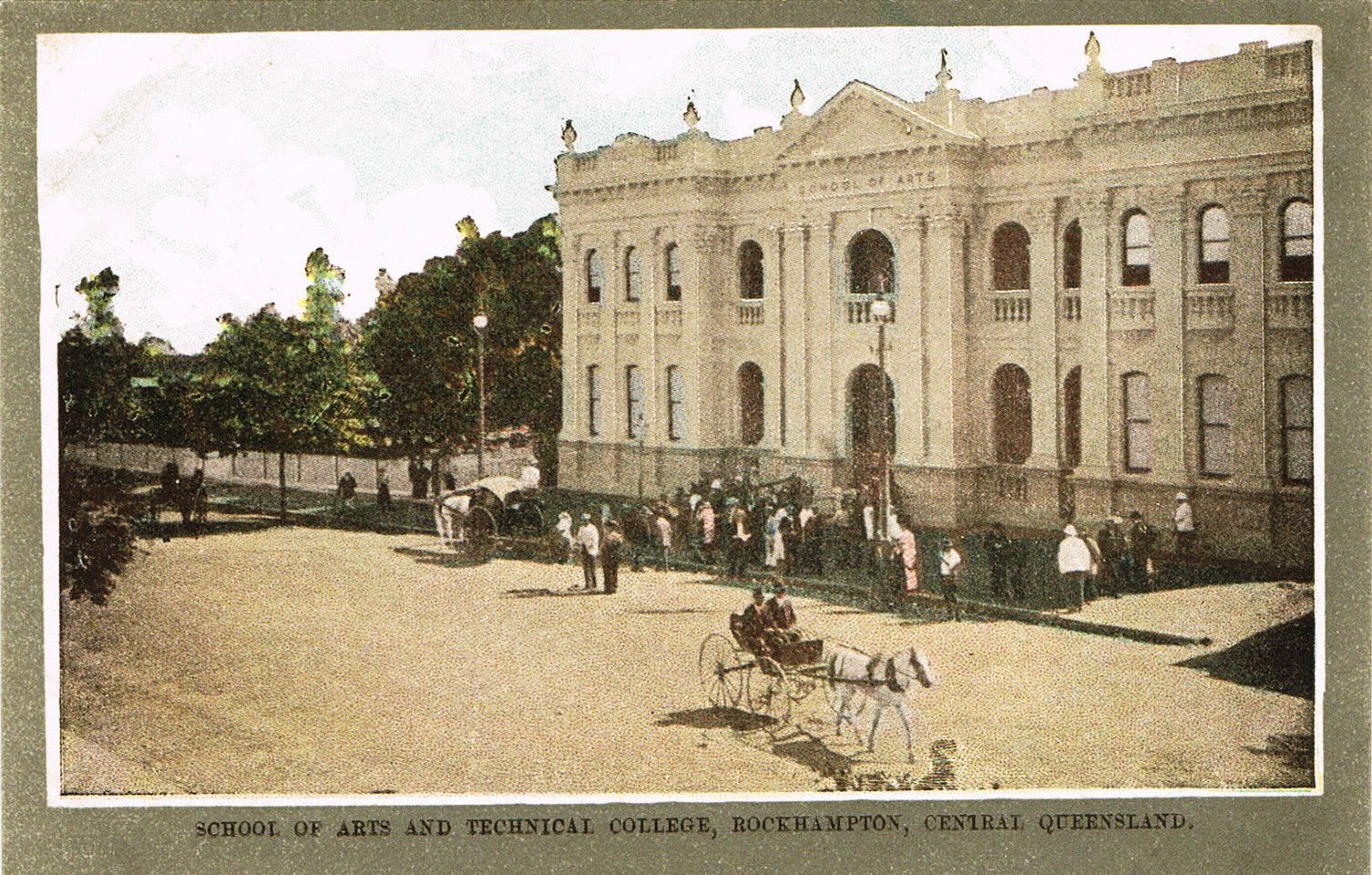
Rockhampton School of Arts, 1908

The Rockhampton School of Arts building was built in 1894 and is an important element of the streetscape of Bolsover Street in Rockhampton. The building is a fine example of late nineteenth century Victorian Classical architecture. It has formed a major part of the cultural, social and civic life of Rockhampton since 1894, and has associations with a previous school of arts building that existed on the site from 1865. The School of Arts building is evidence of the growth of the City of Rockhampton, and is a reflection of the confidence, drive and energy of the citizens in the period of the late nineteenth and early twentieth centuries.

Rockhampton is fortunate in having such an excellent School of Arts which, was established so long ago as July 1861. The promoters worked under many disadvantages for a long time. The population was small, and there was great difficulty in getting a supply of books and papers, not to speak of collecting funds for a suitable building. A considerable portion of the population was coming and going, and many others were not of a reading class. However, on 23 July 1861 a meeting was held in the Rockhampton Court House, when it was resolved to establish a School of Arts.

Schools of Arts were synonymous with Mechanics' Institutes, established in Britain early in the nineteenth century, and transplanted throughout the British Empire during the colonial era. The movement was instituted by George Birbeck who established a class for journeymen mechanics in Glasgow, and later formed the first Mechanics' Institute in London. The purpose of forming such an institute was to improve the education of working men, and to instruct them in various trades. By the late nineteenth century, Mechanics' Institutes had become popular agencies of adult education in general.

Mechanics' Institutes were part of a wider nineteenth century movement promoting popular education in Britain, at which time co-operative societies, working men's colleges and the university extension movement were established. The call for popular education in turn can be contextualised within the broader liberal, laissez-faire, non- interventionist philosophy which dominated British social, economic and political ideologies in the nineteenth century. In this environment, Mechanics' Institutes flourished as a means by which working men might improve their lot, either through self-education (the provision of reading rooms was an important facility provided by the Institutes), or by participating in instructional classes organised and funded by Institute members.

A School of Arts Reserve was proclaimed as part of the Rockhampton Town Plan in 1862. Prior to the proclamation of a reserve, a School of Arts had been proposed by the 700 residents of Rockhampton to encourage the diffusion of "literary, scientific and other useful knowledge amongst members". A reading room had been set aside by Police Magistrate John Jardine in the Rockhampton Court House. A Reserve of 1 acre was set aside for this purpose adjacent to the Rockhampton Town Hall. Sect 65A of the Rockhampton Town Survey comprised four portions in an area of more than five acres. The boundaries of this reserve were Bolsover, William, Alma, and Derby Streets. The 1 acre area set aside for the School of Arts was Portion Four, of the north eastern end of the section, with a frontage onto Bolsover and William Streets.

Post 1862, the establishing of the School of Arts faced great problems, with little public monetary contribution being forthcoming. The community continued to push for a building dedicated for a School of Arts in the period of 1862–4, with public fundraising within the Rockhampton community raising £434 in 1864. The Queensland Government promised to match this amount for the construction of a building. Tenders were called for the construction of a School of Arts, and in 1865 a tender of £900 was received from Downland and Hartley. The building however cost £1100 to construct. Despite the blow out in the budget, the first Rockhampton School of Arts was opened on 24 February 1865.

Despite the grandiose hopes of educating the community of Rockhampton, initial community reaction to the use of the public reading room was lukewarm. The overall quality of the standard of public education offered was not very high. Courses were offered in classical languages, at various times, but the standard of education was dependent upon interest from the local community, and the standard of school teachers who were willing to contribute to after hours lectures.

During the fifteen years to 1890 the membership in the School of Arts increased from 40 to 380. Likewise the library grew from 250 to 7000 volumes during the same period. A museum and library wing was added to the building in 1872.

On part of the reserve fronting William Street the portion of land adjoining this major thoroughfare was opened to the letting of commercial businesses in 1883. Prior to this a hotel was opened on the corner of William and Bolsover Street. Prior to 1881, the hotel was known under various names, including the School of Arts Hotel. In 1881 the present name of the Queensland Hotel was adopted. The shops and hotel were separated from the School of Arts building by a service lane.

In common with many other public and private buildings in Rockhampton, the clay strata on which the foundations of the first School of Arts was built proved to be detrimental to the fabric of the building. Underpinning of the front and rear foundations of the first School of Arts was necessary in 1867. By 1881 the movement of the clay sub strata had caused damage to the brickwork. In 1882 John William Wilson, an architect resident in Rockhampton submitted three plans for the reconstruction of the School of Arts.

Wilson, a prolific architect, was responsible for the design of over eighty buildings in Rockhampton in a career from the early 1860s until the early part of the twentieth century. The plans submitted by Wilson were not made public by the Committee of the School of Arts. To encourage further interest a public competition was launched for plans for the intended structure; however financial difficulties forestalled any further action.

As the centre of intellectual debate and learning in Rockhampton, the School of Arts building was used for the inaugural meeting of the central Queensland separation movement in 1890. This movement was to agitate throughout the period of the pre-federation years for the creation of a separate state centred on Rockhampton.

In 1893 further deterioration of the 1865 building made it essential that a replacement structure be built for the School of Arts. 1893 was also a period of economic depression within the Queensland economy; however £5000 was borrowed from the Union Bank of Australasia. The committee called for plans and specifications of a structure that was intended to be the centre of intellectual life in the Rockhampton community. The 1865 building was demolished, and a residence was erected facing Alma Street for the secretary-librarian.

The design that was chosen for the new School of Arts was attributed to local architect William (Walter) Cherry. Cherry was born in 1843 in Scotland, and worked as clerk of works at various Scottish architectural firms. Cherry emigrated to Queensland in 1884, and from 1885 he was employed as a clerk of works by FDG Stanley. The supervision of the design was entrusted to John William Wilson, and the contract let to Walter Adam Lawson for £5,500.

The School of Arts was constructed in masonry, a rarity amongst School of Arts buildings at this period. Bundaberg School of Arts and Maryborough School of Arts were the only other centres with comparable buildings. As Rockhampton was proposed to be the capital of the new state of Central Queensland, its new School of Arts would have to reflect the aspirations of its citizens. At a cost of £5,578 the Rockhampton School of Arts building would be the most expensive in the colony.

The two storeyed building featured a hall with seating for 800 patrons. The front facade of the building was designed in the classical style. The hall area featured a stage, musical pit and store rooms. A committee room, two large class rooms and a secretary's office were located on the ground floor, and on the upper floor were five apartments provided for the reading room and book collection. Other rooms on the upper floor were used for the museum collection and a class room. The reading room was described as being cool and pleasant, all rooms opening out onto the verandah.

The School of Arts building was officially opened in the presence of the Governor of Queensland, Henry Wylie Norman, on 6 March 1894. At the time it was claimed that the School of Arts had no other equal in the colony. Over 11,000 books were housed in the School of Arts collection on the two floors of the building.

An addition was made to the School of Arts in 1903 when a recreation room was provided between the School of Arts building, and the residence of the secretary-librarian. The recreation room featured two billiard tables, a chess and card room and a verandah. Allegations were later made that the rooms were being used for gambling by members of the School of Arts.

In 1904 a two-storeyed School of Mines was added to the complex facing Alma Street. An assay room and furnace were also provided. Classes were offered in metallurgy, geology, chemistry and mineralogy. A lack of interest from students saw the School closed in 1906.

Technical classes that had been a part of the education charter of the School of Arts Committee were taken over by the Department of Public Instruction in 1908. The State Government passed of the Government Technical Schools Act 1908, allowing for the establishment of vocational/education based studies. In 1909 the classes were placed in the hands of a specially organised Technical College Committee that was separate from the Rockhampton School of Arts.

Classes were still held in the School of Arts building, and additional classroom space was made available in the Market Building, for cookery classes, opposite the School of Arts building in Bolsover Street. The Technical College Committee was a partially elected, partially Government nominated body. In 1915 the Rockhampton Technical College was opened in Bolsover Street.

By 1909 the upper balcony of the hall was considered inadequate. Edwin Morton Hockings, architect of Rockhampton prepared plans for a curved gallery to extend from the stage line to the back of the hall and return. The curved dress circle was claimed to increase seating to 1500 patrons. The hall was a centre of social and entertainment life within the community of Rockhampton. Political rallies, fancy dress balls, patriotic rallies and the anti-conscription league all made use of its facilities. In the 1920s the hall was licensed as a place of "public amusement and entertainment".

During times of economic recession or depression the School of Arts was able to draw on additional sources of income other than membership subscriptions to survive. Rent from commercial buildings on William Street, let by the School of Arts provided an income in the absence of government subsidies, or members subscriptions.

Underpinning of the buildings foundations were required in 1923, as a result of settlement of the foundations at the southern corner of the library, at a cost of £591. At the same time the supper room verandah which faced onto the laneway was enclosed with weatherboards and louvres. Ventilation problems in the hall saw portions of the walls removed, and louvres and woven panels substituted. In the library area, air passages were placed in the dividing walls, and a large lantern light was installed in the roof. At the same time electricity was installed in the building, as well as septic toilets.

An entire new floor was installed in 1934 to provide a new surface for dancing. The floor of the library was replaced in 1938.

The administration of the library for the School of Arts underwent change in 1943. In 1927 the Queensland School of Arts Association had been formed to co-ordinate the activities of institutions, and the lending and purchase of books throughout the state. However the School of Arts reading room form of entertainment was facing competition from other popular forms of entertainment such as radio and cinema. In 1943 The Libraries Act established the Queensland Library Board and promoted the public library movement. The Library Board would supply assistance to selected schools of arts.

The Board had maintained paid library staff, however the growth of more formal technical education, and popular forms of entertainment, continued to erode the primacy of the school of arts. With declining membership, and reduced financial subscriptions the Rockhampton City Council took over the assets and the School of Arts in 1946 and began running it on 1 July 1947; at this point Grace Perrier (who had been working there since 1889) was appointed head of the library service.

The library and museum continued to function under the City Council, but the library remained a subscription based institution. In the post war period the School of Arts building became home to the Rockhampton School of Arts Little Theatre (later Rockhampton Little Theatre), and in 1949 the Rockhampton and District Historical Society formed to locate itself on the upper floor of the library. The Rockhampton Regional Promotion Bureau was located on the upper storey from 1959 until 1971.

Alterations were made in 1960 to provide a mezzanine floor above the adult library section on the southern side of the entrance vestibule. The 1960s saw the re-emergence of settlement problems in the foundations. A consulting firm of engineers provided suggestions to combat this problem, which included construction of deep piles to provide anchorage in the clays, and construction of waterproof sealed surrounds for the building. The removal of free water in the ground was also recommended.

The School of Arts Hall was judged inadequate for continued use in 1962. With its deteriorated condition plans were drawn up for a new auditorium in 1963. The old hall was removed, excepting a portion that faced the laneway. A new theatre was built on the location, and was constructed at an angle to provide a facade on the southern part of School of Arts property. The new building was christened the Municipal Theatre. The Municipal Theatre again was an important element of the social and entertainment life of Rockhampton, featuring concerts, balls, functions etc.

The closure of the Wintergarden Theatre in 1974 meant that the Municipal Theatre was the only auditorium venue available in Rockhampton. The Pilbeam Theatre Complex was opened by the Rockhampton City Council in 1979, and was used as an alternate venue for gatherings of a civic or entertainment nature. The Municipal Theatre continued to be used for functions such as weddings, balls and Little Theatre productions, as well as other cultural activities.

The Rockhampton City Council opened a free Municipal Library in North Rockhampton in 1971. The former School of Arts library was opened as a free facility in 1972. For the next five years the former School of Arts operated as a municipal library until the opening of a new Library on the corner of William and Alma Streets on 25 March 1977. The outbuildings of the School of Arts building, such as the recreation room, was removed in 1976 for a new building containing an immunisation clinic, club rooms for the Rockhampton Little Theatre and a caretaker's flat. The residence and two storeyed School of Mines building was removed and a child care centre established on the site.

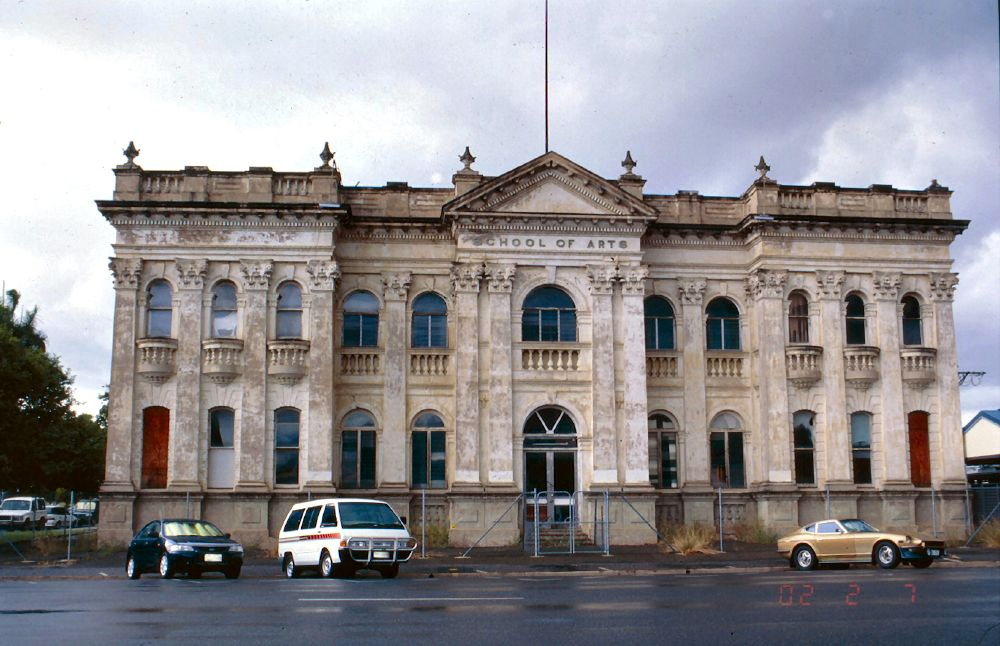
The School of Arts building in 2002

The School of Arts building was classified by the National Trust in 1980. Piling of the foundations was considered in 1982 as part of a projected conservation programme for the School of Arts building, but was not carried out. At the completion of the conservation work, it was hoped to utilise the building as a museum. The Rockhampton and District Historical Society utilised the meeting room and a collection was located on the upper storey of the building until 1983, when the society relocated to new premises at North Rockhampton.

The former School of Arts building has been the beneficiary of a conservation plan prepared in 1994. The School of Arts is a continuing link with the social, educational and recreational aspirations of the people of Rockhampton and central Queensland.

The building was vacant for 33 years prior to 2010, when it reopened following a long-term refurbishment project at a cost of $3 million. As part of the project, a new building housing the Rockhampton Regional Library was constructed between the School of Arts building and the 1977 library, on the site of the demolished 1963 former Municipal Theatre. The 1977 building has since been used to house archives, while the School of Arts building, which reopened two years after the new library was opened in 2008, now serves as public access for the library, council offices and community facilities.

== Description ==
The Rockhampton School of Arts, a two-storeyed rendered masonry structure, is located fronting Bolsover Street to the northeast, adjacent to the Rockhampton Council Chambers. The building consists of the front section of the original 1894 structure, with the c.1964 Municipal Theatre attached at the rear. The building has an elaborately decorated symmetrical facade to Bolsover Street, consisting of a central recessed colonnaded verandah with projecting central pedimented entrance, flanked by projecting corner wings. The facade has Corinthian pilasters supporting a deep entablature surmounted by a parapet with corner urns concealing a hipped corrugated iron roof. The pilasters, which surmount a deep base extending to the ground floor window sill height, are spaced narrowest on the projecting corner wings. The central entrance has paired corner pilasters, and the entablature has the name SCHOOL OF ARTS in relief. Both ground and first-floor verandahs have been enclosed with glass louvres above balustrade height.

The ground floor has segmental arched sash windows to the projecting corner wings, with coursed rendered abutments. The ground floor verandah has arches with expressed imposts, and the first-floor verandah has similar arches with expressed extrados and keystones. The first-floor projecting corner wings have arched sash windows with expressed imposts, extrados and keystones, and semi-circular balconettes.

Both sides of the building are unadorned, and consist of four bays with relief mouldings at sill and floor heights, with roughcast render finish between smooth finish pilasters, and centrally placed window openings with glass louvres. The northwest side fronts onto a service laneway, and the southeast addresses the grounds of Rockhampton Council Chambers. The Municipal Theatre, which adjoins the rear of the building, is set back from the southern corner to create a main entrance.

Internally, the building has boarded timber ceilings and painted masonry walls. The ground floor consists of a central entrance vestibule, leading to a staircase at the rear, flanked by a series of large rooms interconnected via arched openings. Some sections of masonry walls have been removed, some openings bricked-up, and some partition walls installed. Internal doors are of timber panelling with fanlights and architraves, and French doors with fanlights open onto the enclosed verandahs. The staircase has turned timber newel posts and timber handrails, with cast iron balustrades panels, sections of which are missing. A stair has been installed in the northern end of the front verandah, toilets are located in the western corner, and several high level ventilation openings have been installed in internal walls. The first floor is similar in plan, with a roof lantern lighting the stair landing, and paired timber and glass doors with sidelights and fanlight opening from the central hall to the enclosed verandah.

Several areas of the building have deteriorated due to foundation subsidence and water ingress, which has resulted in large cracks in masonry walls and failed sections of flooring. Several archways have timber bracing, and tie rods are visible throughout the building.

The rear of the site includes an immunisation clinic and a child care centre fronting Alma Street.

== Heritage listing ==
The former Rockhampton School of Arts was listed on the Queensland Heritage Register on 21 October 1992 having satisfied the following criteria.

The place is important in demonstrating the evolution or pattern of Queensland's history.

The Rockhampton School of Arts is important for its contribution to the cultural and social development of Rockhampton. Constructed in 1894, the place demonstrates the growth and evolution of the School of Arts movement which fostered and developed an interest in education, cultural and social activities, and the performing arts, in towns and cities throughout Queensland in the nineteenth and early twentieth centuries. The building is located on the site of an earlier School of Arts constructed in 1865, on land which was proclaimed as a School of Arts reserve in the 1862 Rockhampton Town Plan.

The place is also important in demonstrating the development of the civic centre of Rockhampton, particularly during the late nineteenth century,

The place demonstrates rare, uncommon or endangered aspects of Queensland's cultural heritage.

It is also a rare example of a substantial masonry School of Arts in Queensland.

The place is important because of its aesthetic significance.

The School of Arts is significant architecturally as an example of Victorian Classical architecture of the late nineteenth century, and makes an important contribution to the streetscape of Bolsover Street, Rockhampton. The building is an important component of the civic centre of Rockhampton, and demonstrates the grand vision that the community held for Rockhampton as a future northern Capital during the separation movement of the 1890s.

The place has a special association with the life or work of a particular person, group or organisation of importance in Queensland's history.

The place is significant for its association with the separation movement, which was established in the earlier School of Arts in 1890, and which was active in Rockhampton and central Queensland in the period of 1890–1901.

The place is associated with Rockhampton architects William (Walter) Cherry, and John Wilson who supervised the design of the School of Arts. Wilson was a prolific architect, responsible for the design of over eighty buildings in Rockhampton, in a career from the early 1860s until the early part of the twentieth century. Wilson was also responsible for the design of other residences in Rockhampton, such as Trustee Chambers.
