= The Evening News (Rockhampton) =

Evening newspaper published in Rockhampton, Queensland, Australia (1863–1941)

The Evening News was a newspaper published in Rockhampton, Queensland, Australia.

== History ==
This newspaper commenced on 3 January 1863 as the Northern Argus. It was published three times a week by Arthur Leslie Bourcicault. The editor was William Herbert Robison.

From 1 January 1875, it was published as the Daily Northern Argus. It was published daily by Arthur Leslie Bourcicault. The editor was Francis Hodgson Nixon.

From 2 January 1897, it was merged with the Record and was published as the Daily Record.

From 31 July 1922, it was published as The Evening News. The publisher was Walter Sewell Buzacott. The last issue was on 31 July 1941.

== Digitisation ==
The paper has been digitised as part of the Australian Newspapers Digitisation Program of the National Library of Australia.
