= Central Queensland Territorial Separation League =

19th century political movement in Queensland, Australia

Coordinates: 23°26′22.97″S 144°53′09.69″E

The Central Queensland Territorial Separation League was formed in Rockhampton in 1889 with the aim of agitating for separation of the Central Queensland region from the (then) colony of Queensland.

== Aims ==
The Separatists' main complaints were the perceived under-representation of the Central region in the colonial Parliament, located in Brisbane, some 700 kilometres (430 mi) to the south of Rockhampton, and the use of Central Queensland taxes and finances to fund the Queensland Government.

Agitation for the division of Queensland into two or three smaller colonies had been a political question in the colony ever since Queensland separated from New South Wales in 1859. Earlier, unsuccessful, political movements for Central Queensland secession from Queensland had been launched in the 1860s and 1870s.

== Actions ==
George Curtis (1845–1922), a prominent Rockhampton auctioneer and landholder, became the first president of the CQTSL and was elected to the Legislative Assembly of Queensland (the lower house of the Queensland Parliament) in 1893 where he used his position to agitate for the aims of the CQTSL in Parliament.

Archibald ArcherMLA and former-MLA John Ferguson visited England as a deputation on behalf of the Central Queensland Territorial Separation League in 1892. They met with Lord Knutsford, who preferred that to Sir Samuel Griffith's provincial district resolutions were carried in the Queensland Legislative Assembly.

The CQTSL's campaign was ultimately unsuccessful. When the Australian colonies federated in 1901, the new nation's Constitution placed the power to further divide colonies (or States as they now became) in the hands of the parent colony or state, with no avenue for referral to the British Government.

Further movements for the establishment of a new state in Central Queensland, with Rockhampton as the capital, occurred in the 1950s.

== Women's League ==
Supplementing the Central Queensland Territorial Separation League, the women of Rockhampton established their own separation league in October 1892. The inaugural meeting of the Women's Central Queensland Territorial Separation League was held at the Rockhampton School of Arts and attended by 200 women. The League resolved to add support to the efforts of their husbands, brothers and friends to help influence the movement. Their main focus was preparing a petition to Queen Victoria. The introductory text set out their grievances and described the immense size of Queensland: being twelve times the area of England and Wales, and larger than France, Germany, Spain and Portugal combined. They also pointed out that the capital Brisbane was at the extreme south-east of the huge colony. The petitioners felt the far-flung administrative arrangement disregarded the central portion of the state while using local revenue for the benefit of Brisbane and Southern Queensland.

There were no paid canvassers used to solicit signatures for the petition. The League members undertook the task voluntarily, canvassing through populated areas as well as bush districts. One such woman, Margaretta Ramm went to great lengths riding considerable distances alone between towns and homesteads despite difficult conditions including a torrential downpour, her horse being bogged over the fetlocks and losing her way.

The petition measured over 33 metres (108 ft) in length and was signed by around 4000 women. The signatories were aged 21 and above. A later report of League Women’s Committee stated that had the age been reduced to 18 years, another 2000 names could have been added.

A copy of the original Women's Central Queensland Territorial Separation League petition is held by the State Library of Queensland. )It is considered a treasure of the John Oxley Library and too fragile to be handled.)

== See also ==
- Proposals for new Australian States
- State of North Queensland
- Central Queensland
- Regions of Queensland
