= List of people from Rockhampton =

This is a list of notable people from Rockhampton, Queensland, Australia.

Name of resident	Year of birth/death	Notable for
Graeme Acton	1950–2014	Australian cattle baron and campdrafting promoter. Founder of Acton Land & Cattle; brainchild behind Rockhampton's annual Paradise Lagoons Campdraft, which is claimed to be Australia's richest competitive campdrafting event. Died from injuries sustained during a campdrafting event.
Christine Anu	1970	Australian performer and radio presenter. Anu spent her teenage years living in Rockhampton, graduating from Emmaus College in 1987. Her performance in the school production of South Pacific led to an audition with the NAISDA, marking the start of her career.
Archibald Archer	1820–1902	Queensland politician, and one of the Archer brothers. Sat in the Queensland Parliament from 1867 until 1886, serving as the 12th Treasurer of Queensland from January 1882 until November 1883. Archer was also an advocate for the Central Queensland Territorial Separation League.
Duncan Armstrong	1968	Swimmer, Olympic gold medallist at the 1988 Summer Olympics.
Steve Baxter	1971	Australian entrepreneur and investor. Appears as one of the 'sharks' on Shark Tank. Although born in Cloncurry and raised in Emerald, Baxter was a student at North Rockhampton State High School before leaving school at the age of 15 to join the army.
John Bean	1963–2011	Australian cinematographer. Attended Glenmore State High School. Began his career with WIN Television in Rockhampton, before moving onto a 20-year career with ABC Television. Killed alongside ABC reporter Paul Lockyer and pilot Gary Ticehurst in a helicopter crash in 2011.
Alexander Belonogoff	1990	Sportsman, rowing. Won a silver medal as part of the crew competing in the quadruple scull at the 2016 Summer Olympics.
Leanne Benjamin	1964	Ballet dancer, principal dancer with The Royal Ballet in London.
George Birch	1862–1917	Co-founder of the Birch, Carroll and Coyle cinema chain, now trading as BCC Cinemas – part of the Event Cinemas group.
J. T. S. Bird	1842–1932	British-born journalist, author and gold prospector. Worked at Torquay Chronicle and The Recorder in the United Kingdom before joining The Morning Bulletin in Rockhampton. Discovered gold on The Ridgelands goldfields near Rockhampton in 1867.
Wayne Blair	1971	Indigenous Australian writer, actor and director, best known for directing the film The Sapphires and appearing in ABC's Redfern Now.
Paul Braddy	1939	Queensland politician and 28th Deputy Premier of Queensland. Lived in Rockhampton from 1965 until 1995. Served a term as an alderman on Rockhampton City Council from 1979. Entered Queensland Parliament in 1985 after winning a by-election in Rockhampton.
Gerard Brennan	1928	Chief justice of the High Court of Australia.
Thomas Busby		Australian singer, best known as one-half of Busby Marou.
Peter Byrne		Queensland television personality, best known as a Rockhampton-based weather presenter for WIN Television from 1990 until 2012; and presenter of the weekly Rewind segment on Channel 7 from 2012 until present.
John Cani	1836–1898	Italian-born Roman Catholic Bishop – the first Bishop of Rockhampton, consecrated in 1882. Proposed the construction of St Joseph's Cathedral, but failed to live long enough to see the cathedral's completion in 1899.
Tara Cheyne	1986	Australian politician, representing the seat of Ginninderra in the Australian Capital Territory Legislative Assembly.
Enith Clarke	1911–1995	Australian classical pianist. Also the wife of Alexander Sverjensky from 1943 until their public divorce in December 1950.
Ben Condon	2000	Sportsman, rugby league - North Queensland Cowboys. Although born and raised in Roma in South West Queensland, Condon moved to Rockhampton prior to commencing studies at Rockhampton Grammar School where he graduated from in 2017.
Cyril Connell, Snr.	1899–1974	Sportsman, rugby league. Played as halfback in the first Queensland to defeat New South Wales in 1922. Married his first wife at St Joseph's Cathedral in 1927, while living in Rockhampton.
Cyril Connell Jr.	1928–2009	Sportsman, rugby league – Australia and Queensland. Began his playing career with Rockhampton Brothers in 1947.
Brad Cooper	1954	Sportsman, swimming. Won gold at the 1972 Summer Olympics in sensational circumstances following the disqualification of Rick DeMont. Born in Singapore, Cooper moved to Rockhampton at a young age. Joined Rockhampton Swimming Club and began winning medals at the age of 7.
Joel Coughlan	1988	Sportsman, para table tennis. Won a silver medal after competing in the Men's team - class 9–10 gold medal final at the 2020 Summer Paralympics in Tokyo.
Steve Crear		Sportsman, rugby league – Australia and Queensland. Best known for playing in the 1977 Rugby League World Cup.
Kylie Cronk	1984	Sportswoman, softball. Won bronze at the 2008 Summer Olympics in Beijing.
George Curtis	1845–1922	Queensland and Australian politician.
Anna Daniels	1981	Australian author, comedian, radio producer & television presenter.
William Knox Darcy	1849–1917	Mining magnate.
Anderson Dawson	1863–1910	Australian politician. As the 14th premier of Queensland, Dawson is credited with being the first leader of any Labour government anywhere in the world. After entering federal politics in 1901, Dawson became Australia's 5th Minister for Defence in 1904.
Jason Day	1987	Australian professional golfer. Moved to Rockhampton at the age of eight, where he attended St Joseph's Catholic Primary School and then Emmaus College while living in the suburb of Park Avenue.
John Dingwall	1940–2004	Australian screenwriter and director, best known for Sunday Too Far Away, Buddies, Phobia and The Custodian.
Mick Dittman	1952	Australian jockey, best known for riding winning horse Gurner's Lane in the 1982 Melbourne Cup. Also rode the winning horses in three Golden Slippers, two Cox Plates and one Caulfield Cup. Inducted into the Australian Racing Hall of Fame in 2002.
Sid Domic	1975	Sportsman, rugby league – Brisbane Broncos, Penrith Panthers, London Broncos, Warrington Wolves, Wakefield Trinity and Hull FC. Following his rugby league career, Domic became an Indigenous artist.
Helen Donaldson	1968	Australian opera singer.
John Doyle	1977	Sportsman, rugby league – North Queensland Cowboys and Sydney Roosters.
James Duhig	1871–1965	Roman Catholic archbishop, serving as Rockhampton's Roman Catholic bishop from 1905 until 1912. When he was nominated to Rockhampton by Pope Pius X, where he was consecrated by Michael Kelly, Duhig became the youngest Roman Catholic bishop in the world.
Jamie Dwyer	1979	Sportsman, field hockey – The Kookaburras, gold medal in 2004 Summer Olympics.
Albrecht Feez	1825–1905	Queensland politician. Sat in the Queensland Parliament from 1880 until 1883. Prior to this, Feez served as Rockhampton mayor in 1879.
Lala Fisher	1872–1929	Australian poet and writer.
Paddy Fitzgerald	1896–1984	Australian brewer; Managing Director of Castlemaine Perkins (makers of Queensland's popular XXXX beer) from 1977 until 1979.
James Flint	1862–1894	Australian architect. Flint designed a number of Rockhampton's heritage-listed buildings including The Criterion Hotel, Rockhampton Club, Kenmore House and Yungaba Migrant Hostel. Flint was also on Rockhampton Municipal Council and a member of the CQ Separation League.
Frank Forde	1890–1983	Australian politician, served as 15th prime minister of Australia in July 1945. Holds record for shortest-serving prime minister.
Harold Livingstone Fraser	1890–1950	Australian aviator, served in 5th Light Horse Brigade of the First Australian Imperial Force during World War I.
Leonard Fraser	1951–2007	Convicted serial killer. Sentenced to life in prison in 2000 for the abduction, rape and murder of a young girl and further sentenced to three indefinite prison terms in 2003 for the murders of two women and the manslaughter of another.
Vince Gair	1901–1980	Australian politician, served as 27th Premier of Queensland from 1952 until 1957.
Tim Glasby	1989	Sportsman, rugby league – Melbourne Storm.
Matthew Gohdes	1990	Sportsman, field hockey – The Kookaburras.
Ben Goodson	1878–1941	Sportsman, cycling. Goodson represented Australia at the World Championships in Glasgow in 1897, and in Montreal in 1899.
Jake Granville	1989	Sportsman, rugby league – North Queensland Cowboys and Brisbane Broncos.
George Gray	1903–1967	Australian politician. Gray was elected to the Australian House of Representatives in 1961. He died whilst in office in 1967 forcing a by-election. Gray's widow Bray Gray was an alderman on Rockhampton City Council from 1973 until 1991
Thomas Griffin	1832–1868	Australian police officer, executed for the double murder of two fellow police officers while they were on duty escorting a large sum of money between Rockhampton and Clermont. In a case of grave robbery, Griffin's body was illegally exhumed and decapitated, his head stolen.
Duncan Hall	1925–2011	Sportsman, rugby league – Australia and Queensland. Began his playing career with Rockhampton Brothers in 1944
Ernestine Hill	1899–1972	Journalist, editor, poet, author and one of the first female commissioners of the ABC, appointed to the role in 1942.
Paul Hoffmann	1970	Sportsman (cricket), Australia Country representative 1993 and Scottish Saltires Cricket World Cup 2007.
Hector Hogan	1931–1960	Australian athlete. Won bronze medals at the 1954 Commonwealth Games, 1956 Summer Olympics and 1958 Commonwealth Games.
Glen Housman	1971	Sportsman, swimming, Olympic silver medallist in the 1500m freestyle at the 1992 Summer Olympics.
Sir Raymond Huish	1898–1970	Ex-servicemen's leader, best known for his lengthy tenure as state president of the RSL, serving in the position from 1930 until 1967.
Beatrice May Hutton	1893–1990	Architect, first female architect to be admitted to any of the Australian Institutes of Architecture.
Ben Hyne	1994	Sportsman, rugby union. Best known for playing for the Brumbies.
Kym Ireland	1955	Sportswoman, field hockey – The Hockeyroos, played at 1984 Summer Olympics.
Drew Jarvis		Television presenter, best known for hosting children's programs The Shak and Lab Rats Challenge.
Kevin Johnson	1942	Australian singer-songwriter. Johnson is best known for the Australian Top 5 (and UK Top 40) 1973 hit "Rock and Roll, I Gave You The Best Years of My Life", which has become one of the most covered songs written by an Australian musician.
Jess Jonassen	1992	Sportswoman, cricket – Southern Stars. Played in the winning Ashes team against England in 2015.
Margaret Jones	1923–2006	Australian journalist. Jones' father worked on the Rockhampton Harbour Board for more than forty years. After Jones finished her schooling in Rockhampton, she embarked on an extensive journalism career, most notably working as a foreign correspondent.
Rees Jones	1840–1916	Queensland politician and solicitor. Sat in the Queensland Parliament from 1888 until 1893. In 1864, Jones established what is now Queensland's oldest law firm, Rees R & Sydney Jones.
Henry Kellow	1881–1935	Scottish-born Australian literary critic, author and teacher. Long serving headmaster at the Rockhampton Boys Grammar School.
De-Anne Kelly	1954	Australian politician, served as Minister for Veterans' Affairs from 2004 until 2006. Moved from Rockhampton to Mackay in 1994.
Judah Kelly	1997	Australian musician, best known for winning the 2017 season of The Voice Australia.
Nick Kenny	1982	Sportsman, rugby league – Brisbane Broncos.
William Kidston	1849–1919	Australian politician, served as 17th Premier of Queensland from 1906 until 1907.
Mark Knowles	1984	Sportsman, field hockey – The Kookaburras, gold medal in 2004 Summer Olympics.
Rod Laver	1938	Sportsman, tennis. Ranked as the world's No. 1 tennis player from 1964 until 1970. The winner of eleven Grand Slam titles, Laver is widely regarded as one of the best tennis players in history. Rod Laver Arena in Melbourne was named in his honour in 2000. A bronze statue in his likeness was also unveiled in his honour at Melbourne Park in 2017.
James Larcombe	1884–1957	Queensland politician. Served as 31st Treasurer of Queensland, Attorney-General and cabinet minister. Elected in 1912 and retiring in 1956, Larcombe holds the record for the longest serving member in the Queensland Parliament.
John Leak	1892–1972	Australian recipient of the Victoria Cross. Rockhampton's John Leak monument, unveiled in 2012, is named in Leak's honour and is now the venue for the city's annual Remembrance Day commemorations.
Karni Liddell	1979	Swimmer, bronze medallist at the 1996 Summer Paralympics and the 2000 Summer Paralympics.
Jens Hansen Lundager	1853–1930	Australian photographer. Settled in Rockhampton after immigrating to Australia from Denmark in 1879, establishing a business in East Street. After a fire destroyed the shop in 1892, Lundager relocated to Mt Morgan where he served as the town's mayor and editor of the Mount Morgan Argus.
Jeremy Marou		Australian singer, best known as one-half of Busby Marou.
Lorna McDonald	1916	Australian historian and author who moved to Rockhampton in 1963; mother of Miles Franklin Award-winning author Roger McDonald.
Edith McKay	1891–1963	author
Grant McLennan	1958–2006	Singer-songwriter and co-founder of independent Australian band The Go-Betweens. Born in Rockhampton, McLennan moved to Cairns as a small child after his father's death.
Fergus McMaster	1879–1950	Co-founder of Qantas. Inducted into the Australian Aviation Hall of Fame in 2013. A William Dargie portrait of McMaster hangs in the Qantas board room in Sydney.
Don McMichael	1932–2017	Born in Rockhampton, he became a marine scientist and senior public servants in national parks, the environment and museums.
Anna Meares	1983	Cyclist, gold medal winner at 2004 Summer Olympics and 2012 Summer Olympics. Flag-bearer at 2016 Summer Olympics. Younger sister of Australian cyclist Kerrie Meares.
Kerrie Meares	1982	Cyclist, winner of two gold medals at 2002 Commonwealth Games. Older sister of Australian cyclist Anna Meares.
Matt Minto	1990	Sportsman, rugby league – Newcastle Knights. Nephew of former Brisbane Broncos player Scott Minto.
Scott Minto	1973	Sportsman, rugby league – Brisbane Broncos. Uncle to former Newcastle Knights player Matt Minto.
Alma Moodie	1898–1943	Concert violinist.
John Moore	1936	Australian politician, served as Minister for Defence from 1998 until 2001.
Cameron Munster	1994	Sportsman, rugby league – Melbourne Storm.
David Nicholas	1991	Australian cyclist. He won silver and gold at the 2012 Paralympics and gold at the 2016 Paralympics. Nicholas was born in Rockhampton but currently lives in Proserpine prompting Whitsunday MP Jason Costigan to publicly criticise Rockhampton for attempting to lay claim to Nicholas.
Francis Hodgson Nixon	1832–1883	Australian journalist, editor and writer. Nixon was known for writing under the pseudonym of Peter Perfume and wrote 1865's The Legend and Lays of Peter Perfume. After working on various newspapers, he moved to Rockhampton in 1879, becoming editor and proprietor of the Daily Northern Argus. He took his own life in Rockhampton in 1883. Grandfather of Australian poet and playwright Mona Brand.
Duncan Paia'aua	1995	Sportsman, rugby union – Queensland Reds. Born in New Zealand, moved to Melbourne as a young child before his family settled in Rockhampton in 2002.
Alexander Paterson	1844–1908	Australian politician. The first person to be elected to represent Capricornia after successfully contesting the 1901 federal election.
James Grant Pattison	1862–1946	Journalist, known for his Early Days and On The Track newspaper series written under the pseudonym of "Battler". Released the book Battler's Tales of Early Rockhampton in 1939. Son of Queensland politician, William Pattison.
William Pattison	1830–1896	Queensland politician. Sat in the Queensland Parliament from 1886 until 1893, serving as the 15th Treasurer of Queensland from November 1888 until November 1889. Prior to entering state politics, Pattison was mayor of Rockhampton in 1874.
Henry Pearce	1917	Australian politician, sat in the Australian House of Representatives from 1949 until 1961.
Rex Pilbeam	1907–1999	Queensland politician. Mayor of Rockhampton from 1952 until 1982; member for Rockhampton South from 1960 until 1969.
Jonah Placid	1995	Sportsman, rugby union. Although born in Orange, Placid was raised in Rockhampton, attending Allenstown State School and TCC.
Rod Reddy	1954	Sportsman, rugby league – St. George Dragons, Illawarra Steelers, Queensland Maroons and Australian Kangaroos. Coach of the Adelaide Rams. Father of soccer player Liam Reddy, netball player Bianca Reddy and rugby league player Joel Reddy
Fred Rhodes	1877–1964	Australian writer, best known for his 1937 work Pageant of the Pacific. Originally working in Queensland as a master mariner and harbourmaster, Rhodes refused a transfer to Thursday Island in 1921, deciding to remain in Rockhampton. He became a writer, becoming known for his contributions for local newspapers using the pseudonym "Historicus". He also wrote a serial called Broadcasting the Tea Race in 1934.
Matthew Robinson	1980	Actor/performer, starred in Pippin, appeared in Blue Heelers, Stingers; Pratt Prize winner.
Joshua Rose	1981	Sportsman, soccer – Central Coast Mariners FC and Melbourne City FC in the A-League.
Alex Russell	1987	Australian actor, best known for appearing in the films Chronicle, Carrie, Believe Me. Although born in Brisbane, Russell grew up in Rockhampton where he graduated from Rockhampton Grammar School in 2004.
Zach Russell	1989	Singer, former member of boy band The Collective.
Natasha Ryan	1984	A teenage girl believed to have been killed by Rockhampton serial killer Leonard Fraser but was discovered alive in Rockhampton five years later, while Fraser was on trial in Brisbane. The story sparked considerable international media interest.
Storm Sanders	1994	Australian tennis player.
Christopher Saunders	1971	Australian tenor- Only Australian singer to excel in Opera, Operetta, Oratorio and Lieder. Studied with Vera Rozsa and Nicolai Gedda and worked with many of the top classical singers in Europe. Sang with all the major companies and performed regularly with the BBC. A specialist in Mozart and Schubert his voice was regularly described as honeyed and sweet and compared to the great singers of the Golden Age Career cut short by PTSD and health problems. He advocates and helps disabled people. Advocate for PTSD in civilian and military life.
Gretel Scarlett	1987	Actor, singer, dancer, theatre performer; starred as Sandy in 2013/14 Australian production of Grease.
Mary Schneider	1932	Australian singer and songwriter. Known as Australia's "Queen of Yodelling". Mother of Melinda Schneider. Mary and her siblings, including Rita Schneider, were born in Rockhampton but the family relocated to Brisbane following their father's death from tuberculosis
Anthony Seibold	1974	Sportsman, rugby league. After his playing career which included stints at the Broncos and Raiders, Seibold became a coach. Seibold has been an Assistant Coach at the Storm, Sea Eagles and the Rabbitohs as well as for the Maroons.
Belinda Sharpe	1988	Rugby league referee. In 2019, Sharpe became the first woman to referee a top-grade men's National Rugby League match.
Jamie Simpson	1986	Sportsman, rugby league – South Sydney Rabbitohs and Huddersfield Giants. Simpson also attracted media attention in 2017 after he posted a photo of a "Parents with Prams" sign at Stockland Rockhampton and jokingly called for the silhouette to be changed from female to male, mocking a controversial trial in Melbourne to change the silhouettes on electronic pedestrian crossing signals from male to female.
Matt Sing	1975	Sportsman, rugby league – Penrith Panthers, Sydney Roosters and North Queensland Cowboys. Born in Winton, Sing grew up in Dysart before moving to Rockhampton and attending North Rockhampton State High School, alongside Sid Domic.
Bevan Slattery	1971	Australian entrepreneur. Also known for leading the Doing It 4 Allison campaign against the downgrading of Gerard Baden-Clay's murder conviction to manslaughter.
Zac Smith	1990	Sportsman, AFL – Gold Coast Suns and Geelong Cats. Born in Biloela, Smith moved to Rockhampton at the age of 10. Originally playing in the local soccer competition, he was eventually convinced by a schoolmate to try AFL. Not realising he had actually played an AFL game, Smith's father initially thought an AFL Capricornia manager had dialled the wrong number when they attempted to discuss his son's ability.
Alfred Songoro	1975	Sportsman, rugby league – Papua New Guinea Kumuls
Wendy Strehlow	1958	Australian actress, best known for her Logie Award-winning role as Judy Loveday on A Country Practice on Channel 7.
Bert Tabuai	1974	Sportsman, rugby league – North Queensland Cowboys. Attended North Rockhampton State High School.
Anthelme Thozet	1826–1878	Botanist and ethnographer.
Olivia Tjandramulia	1997	Sportswoman, tennis. Although born in Jakarta, Tjandramulia was raised in Rockhampton.
Kenrick Tucker	1957	Cyclist, 1978 Commonwealth Games gold and silver medallist.
Perc Tucker	1919–1980	Queensland politician. Sat in the Queensland Parliament from 1960 until 1974. Served as Opposition Leader in 1974. Townsville mayor from 1976 until his death in 1980. Opened in 1981, the Perc Tucker Regional Gallery was named in his honour.
Michael Usher	1970	Journalist from Seven News.
Tamika Upton	1997	Sportswoman, rugby League - Brisbane Broncos.
Jenine Vaughan	1972	Singer and television presenter, best known for her country album Gypsy Man. Winner of the Toyota Star Maker Quest at the 1988 Golden Guitar Awards. Awarded 'Best New Talent' at the 1989 Golden Guitar Awards. Nominated for Best Country Album at the 1989 ARIA Awards.
Stephen Weigh	1987	Sportsman, basketball – Cairns Taipans, Adelaide 36ers and Perth Wildcats.
Rhys Wesser	1979	Sportsman, rugby league – South Sydney Rabbitohs.
Annie Wheeler	1867–1950	Volunteer welfare worker assisting local soldiers in World War I, became known as the 'Mother of the Queenslanders'.
Tracey Wigginton	1965	Notorious convicted murderer, dubbed the "Lesbian Vampire Killer".
Guy Williams	1984	Sportsman, rugby league – Lézignan Sangliers and Brisbane Broncos. Played in the local QRL team, attended CQU and worked as a journalist for The Morning Bulletin. Williams also coached Cameron Munster when he was in the Berserker Street State School Under 11's team.
Graham Wood	1947	Internet entrepreneur, philanthropist, environmentalist and founder of Wotif.com.
Keith Wright	1942–2015	Disgraced Australian politician and convicted rapist. Represented Rockhampton in the Queensland Parliament from 1969 until 1984, serving as Opposition Leader between 1982 and 1984. Represented Capricornia in the Australian House of Representatives from 1984 until 1993. In December 1993, Wright was convicted and jailed for eight years after being charged with indecently dealing and child rape. In November 1994, Wright was sentenced to a further 12 months for additional sex offences.
Craig Zonca	1984	Australian radio and television personality. Best known as a breakfast host on ABC Radio Brisbane, a weather presenter on ABC Television and as a former presenter of The Country Hour.
