= George Birch (businessman) =

English businessman

George Henry Birch (1862–1917) was an Australian businessman, best known for co-founding the Birch, Carroll & Coyle cinema chain, with E. J. Carroll, Dan Carroll and Virgil Coyle.

== Early life ==
Birch was born in Hull, Yorkshire in 1862, but migrated to Australia as a young man, where he commenced work as a customs officer at the Rockhampton Customs Department in Queensland.

== Hotel management career ==
After his marriage to Mary Ann Cannon on 3 October 1888 Birch resigned from his customs job to begin a career managing hotels, beginning with the Grand Hotel in the seaside village of Emu Park with his wife.

From 1892, Birch became the lessee of the Union Hotel and Theatre Royale in Rockhampton before taking over the Criterion Hotel from 1903.

Following his death in 1917, Birch's widow Mary successfully applied for a hotelier's licence enabling her to continue managing the Criterion Hotel until 1922, when she transferred the licence to Henry Prior.

== Entertainment career ==
In 1909, Birch formed a partnership with Edward "E.J" Carroll who had been awarded the exhibition rights to show movies from J & N Tait's Moving Pictures. As a result, Birch allowed Carroll to exhibit films at his hotels, forming the foundations of a fledgling business partnership with Carroll and his younger brother Dan Carroll, which ultimately led to the founding of Birch & Carroll.

=== Earl's Court ===
In 1910, Birch acquired the site of a previous open-air cinema in Rockhampton which was originally established by brothers Harry and Ben Goodson the previous year. When the Goodson brothers closed the site, Birch upgraded and expanded the site to accommodate 1500 patrons. It was re-opened as "Earl's Court" on 24 September 1910.

Following the successful launch of Earl's Court, Birch & Carroll continued their business partnership which included purchasing properties and managing live entertainment.

In 1912, Birch and Carroll began a business relationship with Townsville hotelier Virgil Coyle when Townsville's Olympia Theatre opened under their joint direction. Coyle's name was incorporated into the business name in 1923 when his Townsville theatres were added to the chain.

Following his death in 1917, Birch's widow Mary, who was also a partner in the company, worked to ensure her late husband's vision of building a new enclosed theatre on the site was realised.

Following negotiations, Birch Carroll & Coyle announced plans for the new theatre in August 1938.

After the company engaged a Sydney-based architect of Art Deco cinemas to work alongside local Rockhampton architects, a seven-month project commenced costing £50,000. The open air theatre was transformed into an Art Deco theatre consisting of a large barn-like enclosure with a hard-top roof and a stepped, brick façade lit with neon tubing. The new 2500-seat Earl's Court reopened on 19 July 1939, becoming one of the biggest single-floor cinemas in Australia.

Earl's Court was eventually further modernised into an air conditioned twin-cinema complex which continued operating until 2000. When Birch Carroll & Coyle constructed the much larger multi-level six-cinema complex in North Rockhampton adjacent to Rockhampton Shopping Fair in 1998, the company attempted to keep the older cinema in the city centre open. However, it struggled against the newer complex and its popularity waned, making it unviable for the company. When the old cinema closed, it ended a 90-year relationship between the site and the company.

Following the theatre's closure, St Andrew's Presbyterian Church purchased the building and moved into the old theatre from their heritage-listed site. The church continues to use the site for their regular Sunday services and as their main regional office.

=== Wintergarden ===
Following Birch's death in 1917, and after Coyle was officially incorporated into the company in 1923, the company opened a new theatre in Rockhampton, as part of a plan to add a network of Wintergarden theatres across Queensland. The Rockhampton Wintergarden Theatre opened in 1925. During the official opening ceremony, it was publicly remarked that the late George Birch, who was described as "Rockhampton's grand old picture man", had always wished that Rockhampton should have a picture theatre of the Wintergarden's kind.

== Death ==
After suffering from an illness, Birch died in 1917.

== Birch Carroll and Coyle today ==
The company George Birch co-founded is still trading today, now branded as BCC Cinemas and operating under the umbrella of parent company Event Cinemas. BCC Cinemas-branded theatres are located throughout Queensland, and Casuarina in the Northern Territory.
