= Yungaba Migrant Hostel =

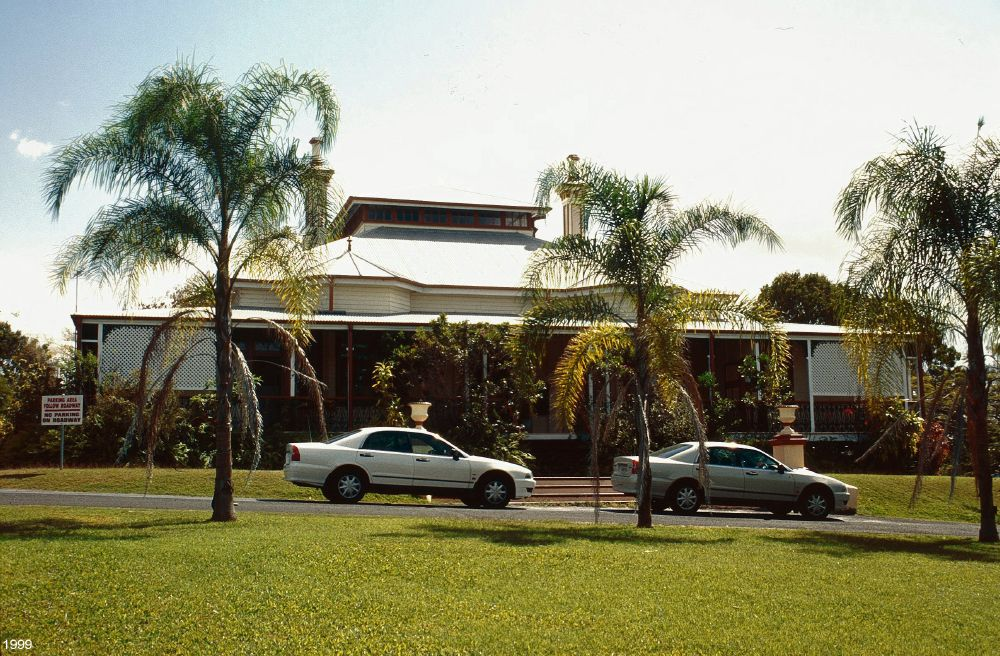
- Yungaba Migrant Hostel, 1999

- Location within Queensland Location within Australia
- 23.3966°S 150.496°E
- Location: 74 Ward Street, The Range, Rockhampton, Rockhampton Region, Queensland, Australia

History
- Design period: 1870s–1890s (late 19th century)
- Built: 1890–1950s

Site notes
- Architect: James Flint (attributed)

Queensland Heritage Register
- Official name: Yungaba Migrant Hostel, Killin, McRich
- Type: state heritage (built)
- Designated: 24 March 2000
- Reference no.: 601939
- Significant period: 1890s; c. 1950 (fabric); 1890s–1950s (historical)
- Significant components: tree groups – avenue of, residential accommodation – housing, tank stand, out building/s

Yungaba is a heritage-listed villa at 74 Ward Street, The Range, Rockhampton, Rockhampton Region, Queensland, Australia. The design is attributed to James Flint and it was built from 1890 to 1950s. It was added to the Queensland Heritage Register on 24 March 2000. Although originally constructed as a private residence, it was known as "Yungaba Migrant Hostel" during its use as a migrant hostel in the 1950s.

== History ==
Yungaba was constructed in 1890 as a private residence for John Ferguson's daughter Catherine Jane Ferguson and her husband, solicitor, Charles Sydney Jones (co-founder of Rees Jones Solicitors), one of the oldest surviving legal practices in Queensland today. The house was named "Killin" after Ferguson's parish in Scotland but was popularly known by locals as "McRich" which may be loosely interpreted as "son of rich man".

John Ferguson arrived in Rockhampton during the 1860s and quickly established himself as a builder and contractor. In 1884, he purchased a large share in the Mount Morgan mine, becoming very wealthy when the public company was floated. He was a prominent political figure in Rockhampton and later a Senator in the first Australian federal parliament.

The house was designed by architect James Flint. In 1887, Flint had opened a practice in Rockhampton which was booming as a result of the Mount Morgan Mine. His most notable works are the mansion, "Kenmore House", which he designed for John Ferguson (1893–94), and the Criterion Hotel (1888–89). Both works are claimed ^{[by whom?]} to be the most florid examples of Victorian Architecture in Queensland.

In 1896, Charles Sydney Jones died and the house was left to his wife Catherine. It is not clear if she remained living in the house as there are reports that Dr John Cani, the first Roman Catholic Bishop of Rockhampton occupied the house in 1895. The property was most definitely purchased in 1898 by Dr Cani's successor Rev. Dr Joseph Higgins. During Higgins' ownership, architects Eaton and Bates were commissioned to design alterations and additions to the residence. The exact extent of works is not clearly understood but it is likely that included the roof top promenade deck and chapel constructed at the north east corner of the house. George Thomas Eaton and Albert Edmund Bates opened their practice in Rockhampton in 1894, having both previously worked for John Kirkpatrick in Sydney. Their practice flourished and branches were opened in Mount Morgan, Longreach, Clermont, Townsville and Rockhampton before moving their main office to Brisbane in 1902. Commissions from the Catholic church constituted a large portion of their work.

Higgins was transferred to Ballarat and the property was purchased by the Duncan sisters in 1909, followed by grazier Robert Donaldson in 1919. In 1925 the residence was purchased by notable Rockhampton solicitor Hugh Grant. It is reported ^{[by whom?]} that the promenade deck resounded with music and laughter whenever young people gathered for private dances which were part of the social life of the times. Grant subdivided the original 2 acre 32 perch site into four parcels of land. This new configuration comprised three 32 perch sites along Ward Street, numbered lots 2, 3 and 4 and the remainder of the original land parcel on which "Killin" was located numbered Lot 1. The larger allotment was configured to allow independent access to Ward Street.

The promenade deck and rear chapel may have been removed from the house during Hugh Grant's occupation. It is thought that the promenade deck was removed as it had deteriorated significantly while the chapel was removed and relocated into town where it was adapted to a private residence.

During World War II the house was commandeered from Grant by the United States Army as General Robert L. Eichelberger's headquarters. From this location Eichelberger coordinated the American army contingent stationed in Rockhampton. During the army's occupation a number of minor sanitary plumbing fixtures were introduced into some of the rooms. These plumbing installations were photographically documented by the US Army. A photo of the whole house taken at the time clearly shows the promenade deck removed, thus supporting reports of its removal during Hugh Grants ownership.

The Queensland Government purchased the house in 1949 for offices. With the war over, Australia again needed large numbers of migrants to fuel the economic development of the country. As part of this initiative the Queensland government decided to adapt "Killin" as a hostel for sponsored migrants. Not since the 1860s had Rockhampton received migrants as part of a government initiative.

As an immigration hostel, the original house was substantially altered. Alterations and additions included the construction of male and female bathroom facilities in the north west corner of the house; expansion of the bedrooms onto the existing verandahs; possible construction of the central clerestorey roof where the promenade deck once sat; possible removal of the entry gable roof and two way stair; and construction of an ancillary dormitory wing to the west of the house. These extensions are no longer in place today.

The adaptation of Killin to a migrant hostel also included a name change to Yungaba. As part of the push for post war immigration, the state government sought to improve the cold and impersonal image of the state immigration depot at Kangaroo Point, Brisbane. Premier Ned Hanlon requested the building be given a new name of Aboriginal origin meaning welcome or resting place. Experts advised that no such translation existed and as such an alternative was selected from a Maryborough dialect. The Brisbane immigration depot was officially renamed "Yungaba" (an aboriginal word meaning "land of the sun"). "Killin" was also renamed "Yungaba"; it is assumed that the renaming was at Hanlon's request.

The functions of Yungaba in Rockhampton were to:

- receive and investigate all nominations
- to attend to reception on arriva
- to provide temporary accommodation for migrants whose destination is to distant parts
- to attend to problems of welfare and after-care

It is unconfirmed when "Yungaba" formally closed as an immigration hostel. However it is reported that the building lay vacant during much of the 1960s. During the 1970s the Queensland Government Department of Family Services occupied the house. The house was occupied by Families Youth and Community Care who use the building for administrative and interview purposes, followed by Disability Services Queensland until around 2007. Apart from the adaptive works undertaken in the initial postwar period, the government had made few alterations to the building fabric of the house. It was privately purchased in 2009 by Rockhampton residents and it is currently a beautifully restored family home. Meticulous historical research and careful planning has brought Yungaba as close to its former majesty as possible.^{[Whose opinion is this?]}

== Description ==
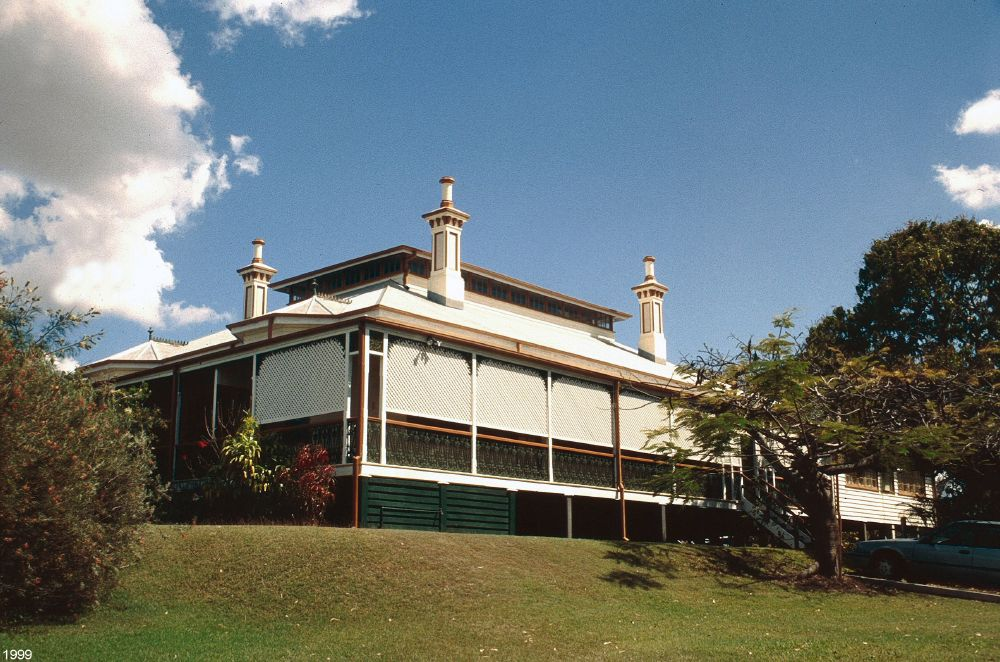
Yungaba Migrant Hostel, 1999

Yungaba Migrant Hostel is a fine intact example of a late nineteenth century grand house. It is located at 74 Ward Street, on the Athelstane Range, Rockhampton on a site which falls from the rear of the property at the north, toward the southern Ward Street frontage. The house is centrally located at the rear of the property with an ancillary building positioned beside it on the western boundary. A number of significant trees located along the Ward street frontage obscure a complete view of the house beyond.

Also located along the Ward Street frontage is a privately owned single storey dwelling sited on the remaining 32 perch parcel of land subdivided from the original two acre 32 perch site.

A bitumen driveway enters the site on the western side of the property and rises up to the main southern entry of the house before slowly turning back down the slope to exit on the opposing side of the site. The driveway also continues around the house to form a ring road and there is a small car parking area located on the northeast side of the house.

A line of palm trees follows the driveway from the street entry up to the main entrance. A concrete entry stair complete with decorative sides, base piers and associated flower pots creates a grand entry from the driveway to the entry terrace before ascending the timber and lace-worked gable (2012) onto the verandah.

Yungaba itself is a single storey residence of timber construction. Elevated slightly above ground level the house is clad in a combination of timber weatherboards and chamferboards and has an impressive roof line which builds symmetrically from the verandah through the body of the house to a large central clerestorey roof which was formerly the promenade deck. Decorated chimneys are positioned in three corners of the roof effectively framing the clerestorey roof as one moves around the house.

Verandahs surround the southern, eastern and western elevations of the house, however the verandah to the northern rear of the house has been enclosed to expand the kitchen, dining and amenities areas. The verandah has timber posts and handrails with decorative cast iron balustrade infill panels. Timber lattice panels are set above the handrail level on both the eastern and western elevations.

The centrally located front door is framed between two bay windows, whose roof forms are echoed in the main roof form. Internally the short entry hall leads to a central two storeyed open space naturally lit by the clerestorey roof above. The internal room structure of the main part of the house is symmetrical about this central room. Beginning with the two main rooms which flank the entry hall a series of three rooms sit either side of the central great room. On both the east and west elevations all of the rooms were extended onto the verandah area in the 1950s but have now been once again removed and the verandah underneath is displayed. Beyond the central great room the rear northern portion of the house consists of a living and dining room, extended kitchen in its original position and amenities area.

Internally the timber floors were predominately covered with carpet with the exception of the amenities areas. This was removed in 2010 and the original hoop-pine timber floors were polished and restored. The walls and ceilings are clad with timber tongue and groove boards and the timber joinery to door and window architraves is well crafted. The entry hall and central room have a timber panelled dado and a dressed timber arch announces the entry from the hall to the central room of the house. Ornate carved timber and tile surround fireplaces are located in one of the main rooms at the entry, the dining room and a secondary room on the eastern side of the house.

During the immigration period the house was substantially extended. These alterations were easily distinguished from the original fabric and form of the house by the use of different materials including asbestos cement and masonite wall sheeting. The asbestos was completely removed after the residence was purchased in 2009. Additional timber windows, doors and associated joinery added in the immigration period were very simplistic and understated. The added rooms opening along the eastern and western elevations were all extended onto the verandah and as such the width of the verandahs along these sides was reduced substantially. The added rooms on the eastern side of the house have been removed and the verandah restored.

At the rear of the house a timber framed water tank stand complete with galvanised iron tank has been enclosed with timber weatherboards to create what was once a shower room. This enclosure has a simple galvanised iron skillion roof integrated into the tank stand structure.

The two storey ancillary building constructed to the south west of the house is set on concrete stumps. The ring road passes between the ancillary building and the main house. The building is a simple timber framed and weatherboard clad structure with a galvanised iron hip roof. A verandah is located on the north east side of the building and access is gained by a timber ramp. Internally, the building is broken up into a series of training rooms and bathroom facilities, all of which are accessed from the verandah. This building was restored after it was purchased and now serves as an extension of the main residence. The interior walls and ceilings are lined with hardboard with timber cover strips and the timber floors are a polished hardwood.

== Heritage listing ==
Yungaba Migrant Hostel was listed on the Queensland Heritage Register on 24 March 2000 having satisfied the following criteria.

The place is important in demonstrating the evolution or pattern of Queensland's history.

Yungaba Migrant Hostel is important in demonstrating the evolution of Queensland's history, reflecting the Federal Government's post war initiatives to increase immigration in order to fuel the economy. In particular the renaming of the house from "Killin" to "Yungaba" illustrates the Queensland State Government's intentions to improve the image of migration centres in Queensland.

The place is important in demonstrating the principal characteristics of a particular class of cultural places.

Yungaba Migrant Hostel demonstrates the principal characteristics of a grand house. Designed for the sub-tropical Queensland climate, it is a fine example of a substantial timber residence on the Athelstane Range, Rockhampton. Overlooking the town, the Range area was sought after by the affluent families of Rockhampton from the late nineteenth century onwards.

The place is important because of its aesthetic significance.

Yungaba Migrant Hostel is as a well crafted and composed piece of residential architecture and is aesthetically significant.

The place has a strong or special association with a particular community or cultural group for social, cultural or spiritual reasons.

As a primary place of reception, temporary accommodation and guidance, Yungaba Migrant Hostel is important for its special association with sponsored migrants arriving in Rockhampton during the post war period.

The place has a special association with the life or work of a particular person, group or organisation of importance in Queensland's history.

Yungaba Migrant Hostel is important for its special association with the Ferguson family in Rockhampton and the architects James Flint, the originally designer and George T. Eaton and Albert E. Bates who designed the alterations and additions to the house.
