= Yungaba =

Yungaba may refer to:

- Yungaba Immigration Centre in Brisbane, Queensland, Australia
- Yungaba Migrant Hostel in Rockhampton, Queensland, Australia
