= Harold Livingstone Fraser =

Australian aviator

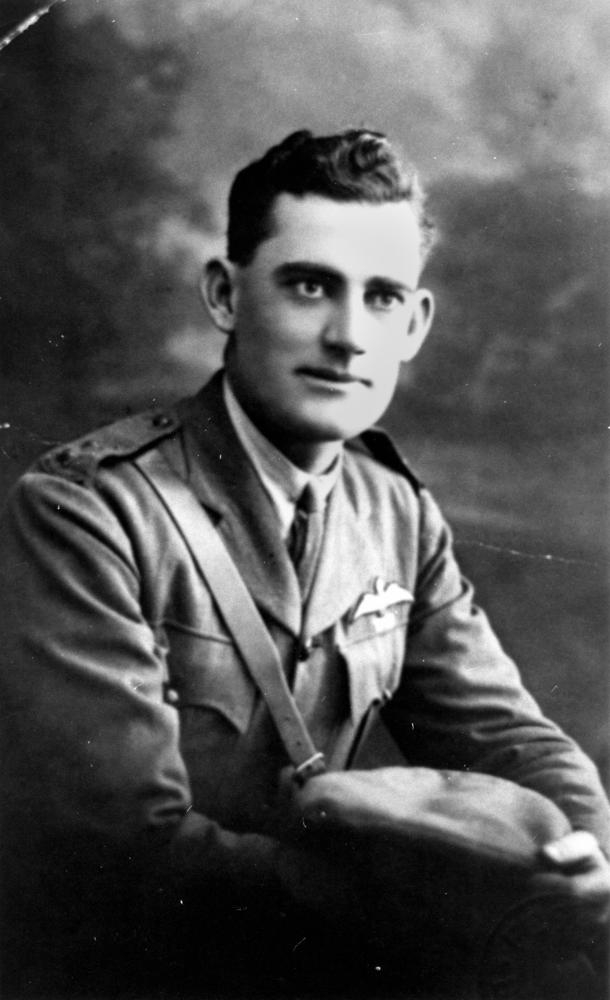
- Harold Livingstone Fraser of the Australian Flying Corps, 1917
- Born: 21 December 1890; Rockhampton, Queensland, Australia
- Died: 1 November 1950 (aged 59); Kingaroy, Queensland, Australia
- Resting place: Mount Thompson Memorial Gardens & Crematorium, Queensland
- Awards: Military Cross
- Aviation career
- Air force: Australian Flying Corps No. 1 Squadron
- Battles: World War I, Gallipoli Campaign
- Rank: Lieutenant
Military Cross
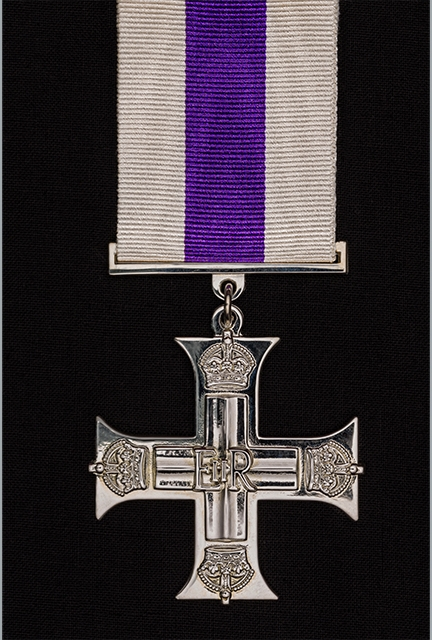

Harold Livingstone Fraser (21 December 1890 – 1 November 1950) was an Australian aviator born in Rockhampton, Queensland.

== Military career ==
Fraser worked as a station overseer in central-western Queensland before enlisting at the age of 24 at Blackall for service in World War I. Joining the 5th Light Horse Brigade of the First Australian Imperial Force on 25 September 1915 and fighting in the Gallipoli Campaign, he eventually transferred to the Australian Flying Corps' No. 1 Squadron on 7 April 1917. He was awarded the Military Cross for distinguished services in the field in connection with military operations culminating in the capture of Jerusalem.

== Civilian career ==
After his war service, Fraser returned to Queensland and engaged in raising and trading sheep. In 1931, he founded Rockhampton Aerial Services and carried passengers, newspapers and money between Brisbane and central Queensland by air.

== Plane crash ==
On a return flight from Clermont on 19 July 1936, Fraser's DH50 VH-UFW lost its engine and propeller at 4000 feet (1220 m). The Morning Bulletin reported that, after a free-fall of 3000 feet (914 m), he 'manipulated the controls to stop the machine going into a spin' and by 'a series of falling-leaf manoeuvres . . . came down on a flat in a bit of open country'. He walked 15 miles (24 km) to Capella where the local publican was startled by his 'queer looking clothes' and 'bloody great silk scarf'. Having downed a stiff whisky, Fraser nonchalantly caught a train back to Rockhampton.

Financial problems, exacerbated by the loss of his plane, forced the sale of Rockhampton Aerial Services and it was sold to Airlines of Australia in 1936. Fraser once more turned to agriculture and bought Strathcona station in the Dingo district where he privately flew a De Havilland twin-engine aircraft. For a number of years he was associated with his brother Donald in successful gold-mining at Crocodile Creek. In 1946 Harold moved to Greystonlea cattle-station, Kingaroy.

== Death ==
Harold Fraser died on 1 November 1950, after suffering severe burns in a house fire at Greystonlea cattle station Homestead. Fraser was trapped in his sleep in the blazing building and staggered through the flames to reach a side window. Fraser who owned Greystonlea cattle station, 35 miles west of Kingaroy, died in Kingaroy hospital 15 hours after the fire. Workmen in bunkhouses near the homestead were awakened at 1.30 am by Fraser's screams. The eight-roomed building was one mass of flames, shooting high into the air, they saw Fraser tumble from a side window. Fraser was survived by his wife who was on holiday in Brisbane at the time of the fire and two daughters.

== See also ==
- List of people from Rockhampton
- Australian Army
