= Leonard Fraser =

Australian serial killer and rapist

- Born: Leonard John Fraser; 27 June 1951; Ingham, Queensland, Australia
- Died: 1 January 2007 (aged 55); Princess Alexandra Hospital in Woolloongabba, Queensland, Australia
- Other name: The Rockhampton Rapist
- Penalty: 5 × life imprisonment + 25 years

Details
- Victims: 4–7+
- Span of crimes: 28 December 1998 – 22 April 1999
- Country: Australia
- State: Queensland
- Date apprehended: 1999

Leonard John Fraser (27 June 1951 – 1 January 2007), also known as The Rockhampton Rapist, was an Australian convicted serial killer and rapist.

== Biography ==
Fraser was born in Ingham, Queensland in 1951 and moved to Sydney in 1957. He left school in the 1960s and had an extensive criminal record dating back to 1966, when aged 15, he was sentenced to 12 months in a boys home for stealing. He would spend the following years in and out of jail for theft and various other crimes.

== Crimes ==
Before a life sentence on 7 September 2000 for the abduction, rape and murder of a 9-year-old girl, Keyra Steinhardt, in Rockhampton, Queensland, Leonard Fraser had spent almost 20 of the preceding 22 years behind bars for the rape of women. He even raped a terminally ill cancer patient with whom he had been living with in early 1997. He was subsequently charged with four murders. Police found many trophies of his victims in his flat; these included ponytails from three different women which could not be traced to any of his known victims.

Fraser originally confessed to five murders in an apparent deal with police to avoid general population in prison, but one of those victims was 14-year-old Natasha Ryan, who was found to be alive and living secretly with her boyfriend in a nearby town after being listed as a missing person for five years. Although there was an obvious inconsistency with his confessions, his defence did not file for a mistrial. Nor did his defence object to the prosecution using the same confession made in custody, which included the Ryan confession, for three other victims whose remains were found. The Ryan 'murder' was also based on testimony from a fellow prisoner who alleged that Fraser drew detailed maps showing where Ms. Ryan's remains could be located. The judge in the case, Justice Brian Ambrose, heavily criticised the media for commenting on the value of confessions to crimes made to police under duress or to other prisoners while in custody, which might have affected the trial.

In June 2003, Fraser was sentenced to three indefinite prison terms for the murders of Beverley Leggo and Sylvia Benedetti, and the manslaughter of Julie Turner in the Rockhampton area in 1998 and 1999. At his trial, the judge described him as a sexual predator who was a danger to the community and his fellow inmates.

== Death ==
Fraser was being held at the Wolston Correctional Centre and, after complaining of chest pains, he was taken to a secure section of the Princess Alexandra Hospital in Woolloongabba, on 26 December 2006, where he died of a heart attack on 1 January 2007.

== Media ==
Fraser's murders are the focus of the Crime Investigation Australia series 2 episode "The Predator: Leonard John Fraser" and Crime Stories episode "Leonard Fraser: the Rockhampton Rapist".

== See also ==
- List of serial killers by country
