= John Leak monument =

Coordinates: 23.368157°S 150.506204°E

The John Leak Monument is located off Huish Drive, in Victoria Park, Rockhampton, Queensland, Australia. Unveiled on 20 April 2012, the monument represents the contribution made by John Leak VC, the first Queenslander to be awarded a Victoria Cross.

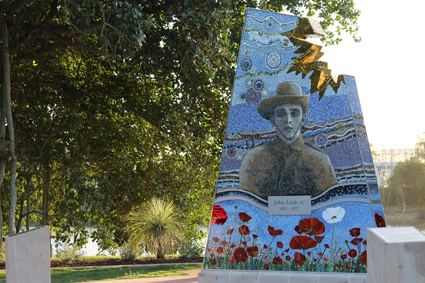
Memorial located in Victoria Park, Rockhampton, Queensland

== John Leak ==
John Leak VC was born 1892 in Portsmouth, England. After emigrating to Australia he enlisted into the 9th Battalion, Australian Imperial Force, on 28 January 1915 in Rockhampton, Queensland. On 16 April 1915 he embarked from Brisbane, Queensland to serve in Gallipoli. The Victoria Cross was awarded for bravery and heroism displayed on 23 July 1916, during the Battle of Pozières, France.

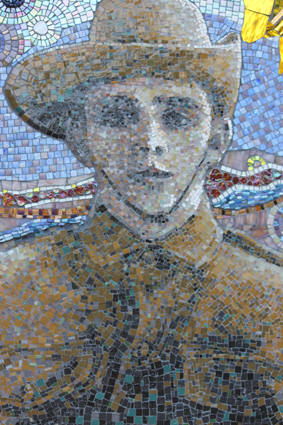
Detail of the portrait of John Leak VC. Victoria Park, Rockhampton

== Monument ==
Dedicated to Private John Leak, the first Queenslander to be awarded the Victoria Cross, the highest award for gallantry that can be awarded to British and Commonwealth forces.

The memorial is unique in that it is a mosaic sculpture made by Rockhampton artist Liz Hills supported by Adrienne Wall and Melinda Clayton. The monument features local iconography with connections to the Archer Ranges, representing the City of Rockhampton, in addition to links to imagery related to the ANZAC campaign such as the red poppy which became an international symbol of remembrance.

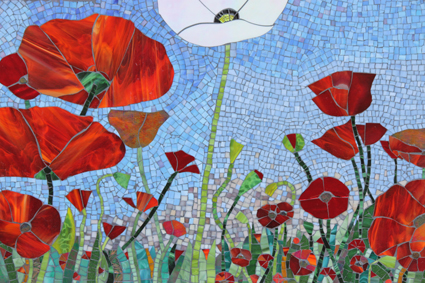
Detail of the John Leak Monument, Victoria Park, Rockhampton

The monument was officially unveiled on 20 April 2012. Member for Mirani, Mr Ted Malone, His Worship the Mayor, Cr Brad Carter, and Mr Peter Townsend, the grandson of John Leak were in attendance.

=== Project funding ===
The project to design and install the John Leak monument was funded by the Queensland State Government and managed by the Rockhampton Regional Council.
