= Rockhampton Club =

Heritage building in Rockhampton, Queensland, Australia

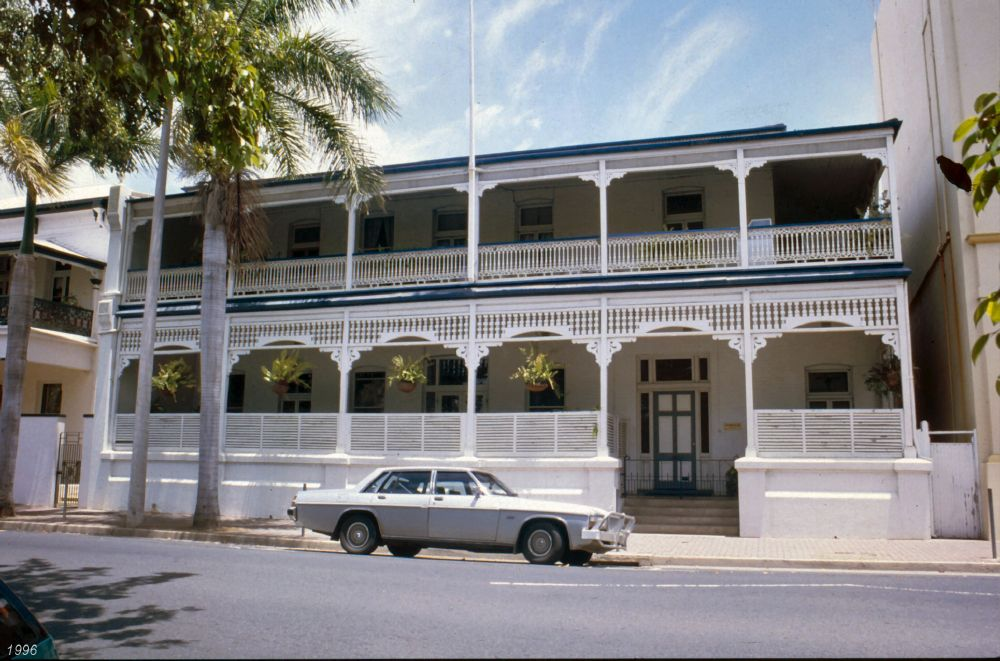
- Rockhampton Club, 1996

- Location within Queensland Location within Australia
- 23.3768°S 150.5135°E
- Location: 166 Quay Street, Rockhampton, Rockhampton Region, Queensland, Australia

History
- Design period: 1870s–1890s (late 19th century)
- Built: c. 1892–1893

Site notes
- Architect: James Flint

Queensland Heritage Register
- Official name: Rockhampton Club
- Type: state heritage (built)
- Designated: 21 October 1992
- Reference no.: 600801
- Significant period: 1893, 1930s (fabric); 1893–ongoing (social)
- Significant components: cellar, other – social/community: component, furniture/fittings, kitchen/kitchen house, room/unit/suite, billiards room, memorial – honour board/ roll of honour

Rockhampton Club is a heritage-listed former club house at 166 Quay Street, Rockhampton, Rockhampton Region, Queensland, Australia. It was designed by James Flint and built from c. 1892 to 1893. It was added to the Queensland Heritage Register on 21 October 1992.

== History ==
The two storeyed building known as the Rockhampton Club forms an important link with the history of the development of the social and cultural life of the town and City of Rockhampton. The Rockhampton Club has been in existence since 1888, and in residence at Quay Street since 1894. Its members have formed an important part of the social and political life not only of Rockhampton, but also of Queensland as well.

The Archer brothers had made a private expedition to the Rockhampton district in 1853, and were the first Europeans to record and chart the Fitzroy River. With additional movement of European pastoralists and settlers into the area the significance of the Archer landing place on the Fitzroy increased.

After the short lived Canoona gold rush of 1858 Rockhampton was proclaimed as a town and declared a "port of entry" in 1858. The first sale of town allotments was held in Rockhampton on 17 and 18 November. During these first land sales, allotment 5 of Section 45 was purchased by William Archer.

On 10 November 1881 a lease of indenture was signed between Thomas McLaughlin and William Archer. Thomas McLaughlin gave his occupation as a brewer. In 1880 the original Fitzroy Brewery had been established on the land owned by Archer. The brewery was owned by A L Bourciault, and F E Russell. Russell was involved in the business for only a few months, until being forced out. Thomas McLaughlin and William Kay Higson then became partners in the running of the Fitzroy Brewery. This partnership lasted only a few months until McLaughlin acquired the share held by Higson. The success of the business saw McLaughlin moving to new premises in 1884, situated on the corner of Quay, Wood and Wharf Streets.

The lease of indenture signed by McLaughlin listed the following buildings as being on the block owned by Archer:

All that store warehouse and buildings situated in Quay Street Rockhampton...with the yards stables and outbuildings at the back...together with the cottage adjoining excepting out of this present demise the upper story of the said store or main building and a stall for keeping a horse at the back of the said store....

The property also had a tenant on the upper storey of the building. Entry to the upper storey of the building was gained through the main entrance of the store. The full term of the lease was to be for seven years, £117 per annum in rent.

McLaughlin maintained the lease, and apparently extended the length of the lease as in August 1890 he was stated as being tenant for three years. In September 1890 an application was made to bring Allotment 7 of Section 45 under the Torrens Title system by William, Thomas and David Archer. The certificate of title was registered in December 1890. A trust was then established in 1891, with three trustees William Pattison, John Ferguson and Rees Rutland Jones being the nominees for the trust.

The Rockhampton Club was established to provide for recreation, relaxation, and the company of like minded citizens in Rockhampton.The Rockhampton Club's first premises were rented rooms in Cook's building in East Street, between William and Derby Street. The club had been formed with John Ferguson as its inaugural president in 1888.

John Ferguson was a builder resident in Rockhampton. He had arrived in Rockhampton in the early 1860s and became a building contractor in the town. In 1870–1, he constructed the workers cottages at the Lakes Creek meat works. Ferguson retired from the building trade in 1888, after becoming one of the half dozen millionaires in Rockhampton, a result of his investing in the Mount Morgan Mine. He was also the president of the Central Queensland Separation League advocating the creation of a new state centred on Rockhampton. Ferguson went on to build the mansion residence of Kenmore House in 1894, which he named after his birthplace in Scotland. It was also expected at the time that he would also become the first governor of the separated state, should this objective be achieved and that Kenmore House would be Government House. His home later became Rockhampton's Mater Misericordiae Hospital.

It would appear that between 1890 and 1891 the Rockhampton Club had decided to move to new premises. Thomas McLaughlin had drowned in 1892, leaving open the tenancy of the land in Quay Street.

The design of the Rockhampton Club building at Quay Street was the work of James Flint (1862–94). Flint was a Yorkshire born architect who had been articled to the Manchester firm of architects and building surveyors, Sherwood and Peverley. He had then moved to London and practiced there for a period of about eighteen months. Following this period of work, Flint emigrated to Victoria in 1883, and worked with a Mr Horsley of Melbourne. In 1887 he moved to Rockhampton to practice as an architect and surveyor. He took up offices in Central Chambers in East Street. At this time John William Wilson and James Flint were the main architects active in Rockhampton. In the booming economy of Rockhampton and Mount Morgan he designed several notable buildings, including Pinehurst, at Athelstane Range (1893–94), the Walter Reid and Co. Stores (1889) and the Criterion Hotel (1888–89) and the Children's Hospital, Athelstane Range (1889). Flint was also a member of the Rockhampton Municipal Council, as well as the Central Separation League, the lobby group pushing for separation from southern Queensland to form a state by federation.

Tenders for the erection and completion of new premises for the Rockhampton Club in Quay Street had been called for by James Flint on 7 January 1892. The building was completed by 1893.

The Rockhampton Club bought the building from the McLaughlin estate in 1904. In 1906 the trustees for the Rockhampton Club borrowed £3400. It is unsure the reason for borrowing this amount. John Ferguson, trustee for the club, died on 30 March 1906. In October 1906 new trustees were appointed.

To cater for members from country areas accommodation was provided on the upper storey of the building. Members of the club also were allowed to permanently room at the premises. The club secretary was a paid position. The Rockhampton Club's membership at its largest extent has been nearly four hundred members. Prominent members have included William Kidston MLA, who was Premier of Queensland from 1906 to 1911.

In 1915 a mortgage for £2000 was taken out from the Corporation of the Diocese of Rockhampton, and was repaid in the same year. At the same time the trustees borrowed £1200 from the Union Bank of Australia.

Membership declined in the period post World War I. The club at this stage was experiencing difficulties in maintaining numbers, and at the Annual General meeting of 1921, mention was made of the strenuous times the club had passed through. New trustees for the club were appointed in 1923.

From 1925 to 1926 Peter Rees Jones (of the legal family in Rockhampton) was president of the Rockhampton Club. He was also a permanent resident of the club, being one of its longest members to be accommodated in the building. During a heatwave in February 1928, he apparently died in his sleep at the club, a result of heart failure.

Alterations were made to the building in 1930, when a special committee meeting initially rejected a tender for proposed improvements to the building. It was felt that the Rockhampton Club would be unable to meet repayments. The decision was made instead to construct a downstairs billiard room suitable for two tables, make alterations to the bar and erect a suitable lavatory.

After the economic depression of the 1930s the Rockhampton Club again underwent a building extension program in 1938. However the outbreak of the Second World War again saw a slump in membership numbers.

The Rockhampton Club has always maintained a policy of opening its doors on time to its members. During the 1954 flood that devastated Rockhampton, flood waters reached the level of the top stair at the Quay Street main entrance. Members used the Quay Lane (rear entrance) during the crisis.

In the 1970s the club experienced problems with declining membership. In the 1980s a proposal was put forward by the Anglican Diocese of Rockhampton to purchase the club building; however the proposal was rejected. New trustees were appointed in 1986 for the Rockhampton Club

In 1991 in an attempt to attract additional members the 103 year old rule to exclude female members was revoked. Despite an increase in numbers with the inclusion of women, the club was finding it difficult to maintain levels of membership. Increasing competition from other clubs and especially sporting clubs were affecting the continuing existence of the club. By 1995 only 150 people were registered members.

Tenders for the sale of the building were offered in August 1995, the intention to find a buyer for the building who would be willing to lease the premises back to the club. Proceeds from the sale were intended to be channelled into the facilities of the building, to cater for outside functions. The eventual purchasers of the building were two club members who have undertaken to lease the premises back to the club.

The Rockhampton Club closed in 2002 and the premises occupied by accountants and financial planners.

In December 2015, the building was up for sale.

== Description ==
The Rockhampton Club is a two storeyed painted and face brick building located prominently on Quay Street overlooking the Fitzroy River. Adjacent to the Rockhampton Club, on the south eastern side, is the Trustee Chambers which complements the club in both size and scale.

The Rockhampton Club has a rectangular plan facing Quay Street with two rear extensions; a double storeyed service wing on the south eastern property line and a single storeyed former billiard room extension on the north western property line. The shallow hipped roof over the principal section of the building is clad with early corrugated iron. The rear extensions have more recent corrugated iron hipped roofs. A clerestory lantern is found on the apex of the roof over the former billiard room.

The Rockhampton Club's Quay Street facade, constructed of brick which has been subsequently painted, is lined with a double storeyed verandah, featuring ornate timber and iron work. At the ground floor level seven timber verandah posts rest on short masonry piers which form part of a masonry plinth. Surmounting the plinth and between the columns are fixed timber louvred panels which extend upwards for about one third of the height of the column. A frieze rail supports an ornate frieze of turned timber members, similar to balusters, with a central arched panel set among them. The corners between the frieze and columns are filled with unusual timber fretwork brackets. The upper floor of the verandah, which extends around the north western side of the building, has a cast iron balustrade linking the timber columns which have timber brackets. A narrow cast iron frieze runs between a timber frieze rail and the verandah beam. The soffit of this verandah is clad with timber boards.

The entrance door is located to the northern end of the principal facade and access is provided to this from Quay Street up several concrete steps interrupting the ground floor verandah, which is aligned with the ground floor level. The six panelled timber door is surrounded by sidelights and a rectangular transom light, which is fitted with etched glass with lettering "ROCKHAMPTON CLUB". Elsewhere on this facade are, on the ground floor, three other doors and two windows all regularly spaced, and on the first floor six openings, including some French doors.

The entrance door provides access to the ground floor of the Rockhampton Club which has seen many alterations, principally because the entrance door has been shifted from its former central location on the Quay Street facade to one end of the club. The various rooms on the Quay Street side of the building have been, essentially, joined to form one large space with very large holes cut in the existing walls, though the early floor plan is still evident. In the eastern corner of the building is a bar room which has a c. 1960s fitout with an amorphous planned bar with tapering side. In the western corner is a sitting room and beyond this, to the rear of the club, access is provided to the former billiard room extension, now used as a dining room. Early half glazed double doors have been fitted within a new glass and plasterboard partition to form the entrance to the sitting room. Generally the ground floor has timber board ceilings, surviving plaster roses, timber skirtings and carpeted floors.

At the rear of the original entrance area, and separated by a plaster moulded archway is an elegant and finely crafted geometric stair, with winding handrail and a newel on the third tread. This stair arrives in a large open vestibule on the first floor defined with a number of large plaster archways. From this area access is provided to a large reception room above the bar room in the eastern corner of the building. Other than this room are many smaller rooms, formerly used as bedrooms, with rudimentary finishes and fittings.

The interior features many important pieces of furniture and fittings, including an honour board, an original Rockhampton Club sideboard other early furniture associated with the club and an early bell indication board. Beneath the bar on the ground floor is a brick lined cellar.

The two storeyed former service wing is also constructed of face brick though this has been painted in sections. Lining the north western facade of the wing is a double storeyed timber verandah. This is infilled on the upper level with horizontal timber boarding and is partially infilled on the lower level, accommodating a kitchen extension. The early kitchen survives on the ground floor of this wing. The upper floor, reached by a dog legged timber stair is attached to the main building with a partially open walkway. This contains several small rooms, partitioned with single skinned horizontal timber partitioning with vertical bracing, which are accessed from an infilled verandah.

The one storeyed former billiard room extension joins to the Rockhampton Club through one of the former reception rooms. It is a large space with window openings on all external walls and a central lantern. On the south western end of this extension are two smaller rooms which are roofed with a skillion awning attached to the extension. The openings on the north western wall have high sills, indicating that fitted seating may have been attached along this wall of the main room. This section of the building is clad internally with plaster walls and fibrous cement ceiling which is braced with strips of timber roll moulding, this cladding extends to the interior of the central lantern, where operable clerestory windows provide light and ventilation.

To the rear of the building is a substantial car parking space, with a brick boundary wall facing Quay Lane.

== Heritage listing ==
Rockhampton Club was listed on the Queensland Heritage Register on 21 October 1992 having satisfied the following criteria.

The place is important in demonstrating the evolution or pattern of Queensland's history.

The Rockhampton Club building illustrates the growth of Rockhampton in the late 1880s as result of the wealth generated by the Mount Morgan Mine. It is in particular associated with the group of investors who benefited from speculating in mining shares from the Mount Morgan Mine in the late 1880s.

The place is important because of its aesthetic significance.

The Rockhampton Club has aesthetic significance as a well designed prominent building which is an important element of the Quay Street streetscape. The building contains many important and well crafted features, including a geometric stair, early furniture and an honour board.

The place has a strong or special association with a particular community or cultural group for social, cultural or spiritual reasons.

The Rockhampton Club forms an integral part of the historical development of the City of as it shows the development of a club dedicated to the social and intellectual and leisure activities of a group of prominent professional people. It is significant as a continuing social entity from the nineteenth century, maintaining its identity of a social institution for central Queensland.

The place has a special association with the life or work of a particular person, group or organisation of importance in Queensland's history.

The Rockhampton Club has a special association with the Rockhampton architect James Flint, who also designed the Criterion Hotel in Quay Street. It has a special association with the lives of John Ferguson founding president of the Rockhampton Club, and one of the leading lobbyist for a separate state centred on Rockhampton, and Rees Sydney Jones trustee of the club and founder of the oldest legal firm still practising in Queensland.
