= Hugh Grant (disambiguation) =

Hugh Grant (born 1960) is a British actor.

Hugh Grant may also refer to:

- Hugh Gladney Grant (1888–1972), American diplomat
- Hugh J. Grant (1858–1910), American politician, mayor of New York City
- Hugh Grant (business executive) (born 1958), Scottish-born chairman, president & CEO of Monsanto
