= Natasha Ryan =

Australian person who disappeared for 5 years (1984–2024)

- Born: Natasha Anne Ryan; 9 May 1984; Rockhampton, Queensland, Australia
- Disappeared: 31 August 1998
- Status: Found alive 2003
- Died: c. 2 June 2024 (aged 40); Queensland, Australia
- Spouse: Scott Black (m. 2008)
- Children: 4

Natasha Anne Ryan (9 May 1984 – c. 2 June 2024) was an Australian woman from Rockhampton, Queensland, who went missing on 31 August 1998 when aged 14. Police wrongly assumed that her best friend Maioha Tokotaua—then 15 years old—killed Ryan, but later charged local serial killer Leonard Fraser, who had confessed to her "murder". In 2002, police received an anonymous letter stating that Ryan was alive—the letter also provided a phone number and address where she could be found. Upon raiding this location, Ryan was discovered alive and hiding in a wardrobe almost five years after she went missing. During Fraser's murder trial, it was revealed that 14-year-old Ryan had left home willingly to be with her boyfriend, 22-year-old Scott Black, and had been living and hiding in his home since her disappearance. In 2008, the couple married and reportedly have had three children.

On 2 June 2024, 40-year-old Ryan was found dead by police at a Rockhampton golf course while they were undertaking a welfare check. Her death is not being classed as suspicious.

== Biography ==
Natasha Ryan was born in Rockhampton, Australia on 9 May 1984.

== Background ==
Natasha Ryan disappeared in August 1998 after her mother dropped her off at school, and was subsequently reported as missing. Hopes of finding Ryan alive soon diminished and police concluded she had been murdered by Rockhampton serial killer Leonard Fraser, who was subsequently charged with Ryan's murder. An extensive and exhaustive search was undertaken for her and three other girls two years after her disappearance by police and local State Emergency Service (SES) volunteers as part of an investigation into a serial killer.

In the month before she went missing, Ryan had already run away from home once, aided by Scott Black, her 22-year-old boyfriend. During that incident, she was found after two days. Black faced Rockhampton Magistrates Court in November 1999, where he pleaded guilty to wilful obstruction of police after he had told officers that he did not know Ryan's whereabouts. But after she could not be located when she went missing the second time, Ryan's family eventually conceded that she was dead. They held a memorial service in Bundaberg, Queensland on her 17th birthday in 2001.

== Murder trial ==
On 11 April 2003, during Fraser's murder trial in Brisbane, police prosecutor Paul Rutledge informed the court that Ryan had been found alive. Ryan's father, Robert Ryan, said he almost collapsed when Rutledge made the announcement.

Police had raided a house in North Rockhampton on the night of 10 April 2003 after a tip-off and had found Ryan alive, hiding in a bedroom cupboard. It was discovered that Ryan had been living with Black since disappearing on 31 August 1998. It was reported that for most of that time, Ryan had shared a house in Yeppoon, Queensland, but had moved back to Rockhampton after Black received a transfer with his milk delivery job. Ryan had been living in the Rockhampton house for six months prior to being found.

Despite becoming known as "the Girl in the Cupboard" and the media leading people to believe that Ryan had spent most of her time in a cupboard, it was soon learned she only used a cupboard to hide if visitors called around to visit her boyfriend. The remainder of the time, Ryan freely walked around the house but always with the curtains drawn. It was also reported that she had ventured outside a number of times, but always under the cover of darkness, which included a midnight visit to the beach.

Despite the discovery that Ryan was still alive and the doubt it cast on the evidence which led to Fraser being charged with Ryan's murder, Fraser's defence counsel did not lodge an appeal for a mistrial, and the trial resumed. Ryan attended what had been the trial of her own accused "murderer" on 30 April 2003 to answer questions. She told the court she had never met Fraser and did not know the witness who stated that she had been seen in the presence of Fraser before she went missing.

== Prosecution ==
Soon after being discovered alive, it became apparent that Ryan and Black would likely face criminal charges for their role in the false investigation into her murder. In 2005, Rockhampton District Court judge, Grant Britton, sentenced Black to a three-year jail sentence for perjury, with two years suspended, after he pleaded guilty to falsely testifying that he did not know Ryan's whereabouts at Fraser's trial.

In 2006, Ryan was found guilty of causing a false police investigation and was fined $1,000. Police prosecutor Terry Gardiner produced the $120,000 contract Ryan had signed with PBL as evidence of Ryan having means to pay back at least some of the $151,000 police investigation into her murder. However, Magistrate Annette Hennessy ruled that Ryan did not have the means to pay the costs of the investigation. In the same court proceedings, Black was further punished by being convicted, fined $3,000 and ordered to pay $16,000 towards investigation costs.

== Media ==
The story of Ryan being found alive during the murder trial attracted international attention.

Following her re-appearance, Australian publicist Max Markson signed Ryan up as a client, and negotiated potential deals with several media organisations. Markson eventually secured a media deal with Publishing and Broadcasting Limited, which was the parent company of ACP Magazines and the Nine Network. The deal guaranteed that Ryan would do exclusive interviews with ACP's Woman's Day and 60 Minutes.

60 Minutes sent reporter Tara Brown to Rockhampton to interview Ryan. Assuming Ryan's story was going to hand them a ratings-winning program, 60 Minutes held the broadcast until 20 April 2003 in an attempt to take viewers away from Network Ten's premiere of the third season of their ratings winner, Big Brother. The strategy failed to work and Big Brother won the battle with an average capital city audience of 2.2 million viewers, compared to the 1.7 million viewers 60 Minutes managed to attract.

There were reports that the deal Markson negotiated would bring in more than $200,000 for Ryan, prompting a discussion about the ethics of Ryan accepting the money when so much time, effort and money was spent on the search for her, and the police investigation. Rockhampton State Emergency Service volunteer Lyle Dobbs expressed his view that any profit Ryan gained from her interviews should go back to Queensland taxpayers who funded the search which came at significant cost to police and a lot of effort from SES volunteers. During the costs hearing following Ryan and Black's conviction in 2006 for causing a false police investigation, police barrister Terry Gardiner produced a contract confirming that Nine Network had paid Markson $120,000 for an interview with Ryan, her sister Donna, and her mother Jennifer.

Ryan and Black married in 2008. It is believed that prior to their wedding, they signed another media deal with Woman's Day for exclusivity to the stories that were published before and after their wedding. During the wedding at Byfield, Queensland, there was strict security, with guests screened and strictly forbidden from taking any photos during the ceremony and reception. It was reported the wedding story deal with Woman's Day was worth $200,000.

== Death ==
On the morning of 2 June 2024, Ryan's body was found by police at Rockhampton Golf Club. She was 40 years old. Foul play was ruled out.

== See also ==
- List of solved missing person cases: 1990s
