= John Leak =

Australian recipient of the Victoria Cross

John Leak VC
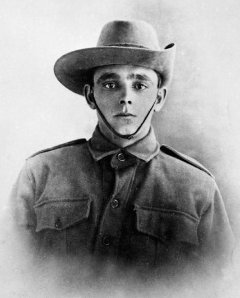
- John Leak, c. 1916
- Born: 1892; Portsmouth, United Kingdom
- Died: 20 October 1972 (aged 79–80); Redwood Park, South Australia
- Military career
- Allegiance: Australia
- Branch: Australian Imperial Force
- Service years: 1915–1919
- Rank: Private
- Units: 9th Battalion
- Conflicts: World War I; Gallipoli Campaign; Western Front; Battle of Pozières; Battle of Mouquet Farm
- Awards: Victoria Cross

John Leak, VC (c. 1892 – 20 October 1972) was an Australian recipient of the Victoria Cross, the highest award for gallantry in battle that could be awarded at that time to a member of the Australian armed forces. Leak enlisted in the Australian Imperial Force in early 1915, and served with the 9th Battalion in the Gallipoli Campaign during the First World War. Evacuated suffering from dysentery, Leak rejoined his battalion after it had been withdrawn to Egypt. Along with his unit, he transferred to the Western Front in France and Belgium, where he participated in the Battle of Pozières in July 1916. He was awarded the Victoria Cross for his actions during the battle. The following month he was seriously wounded in the Battle of Mouquet Farm.

Leak was evacuated to the United Kingdom, and did not return to his unit until October 1917. Suffering from the effects of his service, Leak was convicted of desertion by a court-martial in November, but his sentence was ultimately suspended, and he returned to the 9th Battalion. In early March 1918 he was gassed, and did not rejoin to his unit until the Armistice of 11 November 1918. He returned to Australia and was discharged in 1919.

After jobs in Queensland, New South Wales, South Australia and Western Australia over the next twenty years, Leak settled in South Australia in 1937. He was severely affected by his war experiences, and was very reticent to discuss his VC exploits. He did not talk about his service, even to his family, until very late in life. He died in October 1972 and is buried in Stirling, South Australia.

== Early life ==
According to his war record, John Leak was born in Portsmouth, United Kingdom, around 1892, although there is no record of his birth in that city. He was the son of a miner, James Leak. His parents were originally from South Wales, and apparently migrated to New South Wales, Australia, well before World War I, although there is no record of his arrival in Australia. By the outbreak of the war, his parents had died, and Leak was living at Clermont, Queensland, and working as a teamster.

== World War I ==
On 28 January 1915, Leak enlisted in Rockhampton as a private in the Australian Imperial Force (AIF) and was assigned to the fifth reinforcement draft for the 9th Battalion, 3rd Brigade, 1st Division. On 16 April, he embarked from Brisbane, Queensland, on board the transport Kyarra. He joined his battalion on 22 June while it was involved in trench warfare defending the Anzac Cove beachhead on the Gallipoli Peninsula in the Ottoman Empire. This fighting was part of the Gallipoli Campaign. Six days after Leak's arrival, the 9th Battalion was involved in a two-pronged attack against the Ottoman positions on what were known as "Sniper's Ridge" and "Knife Edge", close to Lone Pine. The attack was abortive, and resulted in the battalion suffering casualties of 37 killed and 62 wounded. Leak was with his battalion during the fruitless August Offensive, which was intended as a breakout from the beachhead. On 31 August, Leak reported sick and was evacuated with gastroenteritis, first via hospital ship to Malta, where he was hospitalised and diagnosed with dysentery. In late September he was evacuated to the United Kingdom where he was again hospitalised. He did not return to his unit until 23 February 1916, by which time it, along with the rest of the AIF, had been withdrawn back to Egypt for re-organisation.

In March 1916, Leak and the rest of his battalion sailed for France and the Western Front. They spent several weeks in a quiet sector of the line near Armentières, before deploying south to the Somme river valley, where they experienced their first fighting in France. On 1 July, the Battle of the Somme commenced. This mainly British offensive involved attacks against German trench systems on either side of the Somme. British troops pushed slowly forward towards Bapaume until they were just short of the village of Pozières, at which time the Australian 1st Division entered the fray in the Battle of Pozières. The German positions at Pozières were known as the "Old German" (OG) trenches – OG 1 and OG 2. The Australians launched a preliminary operation on 22 July, but were repulsed. The following day, the division attacked again, this time with the 1st Brigade on the left, and the 3rd Brigade on the right. Leak's battalion was allocated a 550-yard (500 m) sector on the far right flank of the divisional attack. The troops captured the first objective, but were held up by a German position where OG 1 met "Pozières Trench".

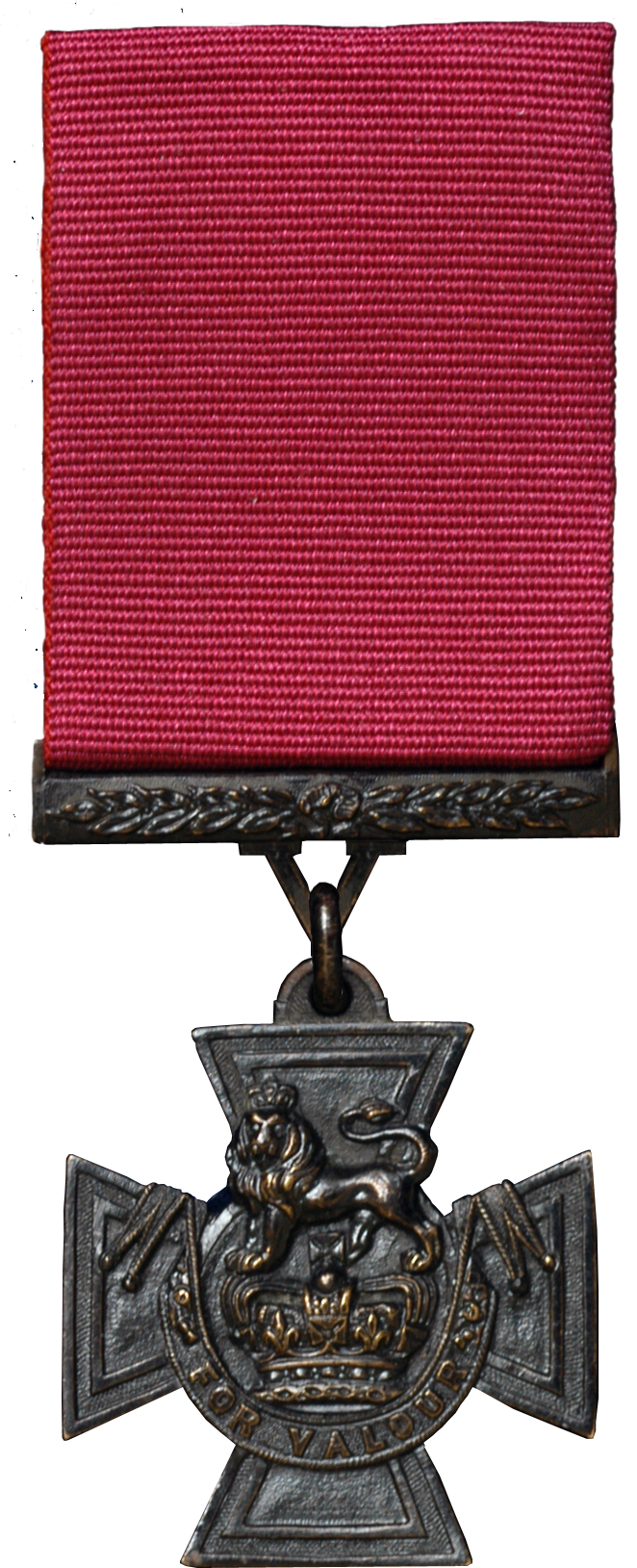
The Victoria Cross

The 9th Battalion was being held up by a pair of German machine guns. An intense bomb (hand grenade) fight began, during which the heavier Mills bombs used by the Australians were outranged by the lighter German Model 17 grenades. Leak ran forward and threw three Mills bombs into the machine gun post, then leapt into the post, attacking the garrison with his bayonet. By the time the rest of his platoon got to the post, Leak was wiping blood off his bayonet with his slouch hat. The fighting around Pozières continued after this incident, and two days later the Germans laid down a tremendous artillery barrage on the positions that had been captured from them, described by the official Australian war correspondent, Charles Bean, as "among the heaviest that occurred either on the Somme or at Verdun". During the fighting and the subsequent deluge of shells, the 9th Battalion had been reduced from a strength of 1,016 men to 623.

On 31 July, Leak was recommended for the award of the Victoria Cross (VC) for his actions at Pozières. At that time, the VC was the highest award for gallantry in battle that could be awarded to a member of the Australian armed forces.

After Pozières, the 9th Battalion was relieved, but it was back in action in mid-August during the Battle of Mouquet Farm. During this fighting, the 9th Battalion suffered another 163 casualties. One of those casualties was Leak, who had suffered a serious wound to the back on 21 August, during a German artillery bombardment near the "Gibraltar" blockhouse. While he was in a medical facility in France, his VC was gazetted. The citation read:

For most conspicuous bravery. He was one of a party which finally captured an enemy strong point. At one assault, when the enemy's bombs were outranging ours, Private Leak jumped out of the trench, ran forward under heavy machine-gun fire, and threw three bombs into the enemy's bombing post. He then jumped into the post and bayoneted three unwounded enemy bombers. Later, when the enemy in overwhelming numbers was driving his party back, he was always the last to withdraw at each stage, and kept on throwing bombs. His courage and energy had such an effect on the enemy that, on the arrival of reinforcements, the whole trench was recaptured.

— The London Gazette, September 1916

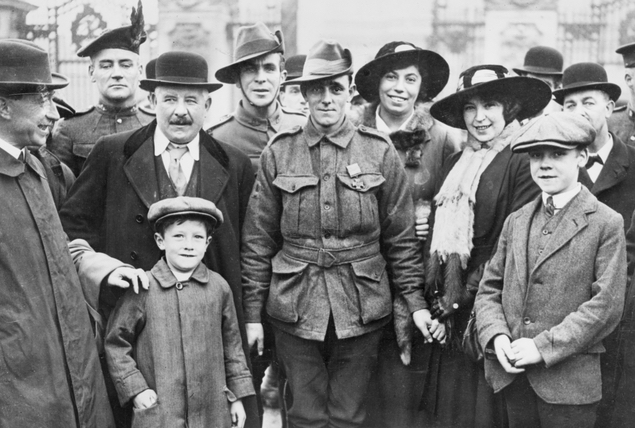
Leak (centre) with friends and admirers, taken after his investiture by King George V at Buckingham Palace. He is holding hands with a woman, likely to be Beatrice May Chapman, whom he married two years later.

Leak was evacuated to hospital in the United Kingdom on 13 September. On 4 November, he was invested with his VC by King George V at Buckingham Palace. While in the UK, he breached military discipline on two occasions. In the first instance, he was charged for entering the Sergeants' Mess and demanding a drink, and disobeying his regimental sergeant major in January 1917. For this he was convicted and underwent fourteen days' detention. On 23 February, he went absent without leave until 2 March, and following this conviction was punished with four days' detention and fifteen days' loss of pay.

On 23 March, Leak was transferred from the 9th Battalion to the 69th Battalion. The 69th Battalion was being raised in the United Kingdom as part of the short-lived 16th Brigade, 6th Division, which was being formed using men who were recovering from wounds or illness in the United Kingdom. In June, Leak gave evidence at the trial of an Australian soldier accused of wearing a VC ribbon on his uniform when he was not a recipient of the award. In his evidence, Leak said he had never asked the man about his VC, because "he objected to [being] questioned himself about his own deed." He went absent without leave again in July, but this time only received a fine. The 69th Battalion was disbanded to provide reinforcements to existing units, and on 11 August Leak was transferred back to the 9th Battalion and marched out to the Overseas Training Depot.

Leak returned to the Western Front in October, after his battalion had fought in the Battles of Broodseinde and Passchendaele in Belgium. By this stage, Leak was clearly affected by combat-related trauma and was not coping with the effects of the relentless shell-fire, and went absent without leave from his unit as it deployed forward into the front line to relieve Canadian troops on 1 November. He was arrested five days later, was court-martialled on 23 November, and found guilty of desertion from the line between 1 and 6 November. During his trial, Leak said he was unable to stand artillery fire. His sentence was life imprisonment, but this was commuted to two years hard labour. Ultimately, the sentence was suspended, and Leak returned to his unit on 23 December. Leak continued to serve on the Western Front with his battalion until 7 March 1918, when he was gassed during a lengthy bombardment of his unit's positions near Hollebeke. Medically evacuated to the United Kingdom once again, he did not return to his unit before the Armistice of 11 November 1918.

On 30 December 1918, after his court-martial sentence was finally remitted, Leak married Beatrice May Chapman in Cardiff, Wales. On 9 February 1919, Leak and Beatrice sailed for Australia aboard the SS Ascanius, arriving in Queensland on 26 March. On 10 April, he attended a reception in his honour at Rockhampton, but declined to speak, then returned to Clermont by train. He was discharged from the AIF on 31 May. In addition to his VC, he received the 1914–15 Star, British War Medal and Victory Medal.

== Later life and legacy ==
For a short time, Leak was involved in a firewood business with a couple of other returned servicemen, then spent time working in regional New South Wales. Next, he moved to remote mid-north South Australia where he found work boring wells. At some point he and his wife separated; it is unknown what happened to her. On 12 January 1927, he married Ada Victoria Bood-Smith; the couple were devoted to one another. In 1932, they moved to Esperance, Western Australia, where Leak worked in a garage. In 1937, Leak was awarded the King George VI Coronation Medal. In the same year, the Leak family moved back to South Australia, and settled near Crafers. They had eight children in total, although their first died within a year of her birth; the last was born in 1946.

Leak struggled his whole life with his war experiences, and was reluctant to talk about them for many years. One of his sons observed that "World War One destroyed him." He did not attend reunions or Anzac Day marches, and faded into obscurity. Later in life he shared some of his experiences with his children, remembering dead comrades and also those he had killed. He stored his VC in a box in his bedroom and it largely stayed there. In later life, Leak suffered from bronchitis and emphysema caused by his gassing in 1918. In 1953, Leak was awarded the Queen Elizabeth II Coronation Medal. In 1964, Ada died suddenly. Two years later, a fake VC with Leak's name engraved on it surfaced in Melbourne, Victoria; the dealer was fined for being in possession of a forged VC.

On 20 October 1972, Leak died at Redwood Park and was buried alongside Ada in the Stirling cemetery.

A street in Gallipoli Barracks in Enoggera, Queensland, is named after him. The John Leak monument was unveiled in Rockhampton on 20 April 2012 to honour Leak, who enlisted in the city. In 2015, while delivering the Ode of Remembrance, Leak's grandson Peter Townsend said his family always travel to Rockhampton for the Remembrance Day service, which is held annually at his grandfather's memorial. As of 2018, Leak's medals were in private hands.
