= James Flint (architect) =

James Flint was a British and Australian architect. A number of his works are heritage-listed.

== Early life ==
Flint was born in 1862 in Eppleworth, Hull, Yorkshire, England, the son of James Flint and Annie Eliza Sherwood.

== Architectural career ==
Flint was articled to the Manchester firm of architects and building surveyors Sherwood and Peverley. He then moved to London and practiced there for about eighteen months. Following this work period, Flint emigrated, arriving in Victoria in December 1883, and entered into a partnership with Mr Horsley in Melbourne.

In 1887, he moved to Rockhampton to practice as an architect and surveyor. He took up offices in Central Chambers on East Street. He and John William Wilson were the main architects active in Rockhampton. Rockhampton and Mount Morgan Flint designed several notable buildings in the booming economy.

== Politics ==
Flint was also a member of the Rockhampton Municipal Council and the Central Separation League, the lobby group pushing for the separation of Central Queensland as an independent state.

== Later life ==
James Flint died on 6 January 1894 at Rockhampton from heart disease. He was buried in South Rockhampton Cemetery on 7 January 1894.

== Significant works ==
His significant works (known and attributed) include:

- Criterion Hotel (1888–9)
- Yungaba Migrant Hostel (1890)
- Rockhampton Club (1892)
- Kenmore House (circa 1894)
