= Graeme Acton =

Australian cattle baron

Graeme William Acton (15 November 1950 – 9 May 2014) was an Australian cattle baron, who was also known for his involvement in the Australian sport of campdrafting.

== Early life ==
Acton was born in Rockhampton, Queensland on 15 November 1950 to parents Thomas and Valma Acton. He grew up on his parents' cattle property "Wilpeena", north of the township of Dingo, with his four siblings Robert, Elizabeth, Evan and Allen.

== Business ==
Acton's first investment was made in 1970 when he established Arana Downs with his brother Robert. For the first several years of owning the property, the brothers lived in a tent with their pet cat. Acton continued to grow his investment portfolio until he established the Acton Land and Cattle Company with his brother Evan, which ultimately incorporated 180,000 head of Santa Gertrudis, Charolais, Angus and Brahman cattle on various properties which totaled an area of 3.87 million acres.

Acton's empire ultimately consisted of the million-acre Millungera Station, north of Julia Creek; Barkly Downs, west of Mount Isa; Moray Downs, west of Clermont; Iffley Station, south-west of Mackay; Croydon Station, north of Rockhampton; Mountain View west of Rockhampton; and the Acton's home property Paradise Lagoons, also west of Rockhampton.

The business continued to grow, to become one of the country's largest vertically-integrated farming operations valued at $500 million, fulfilling a demand for both domestic and international export markets and which included distributing its own brand of beef called Acton Super Beef. Acton's company exported approximately 30,000 head of cattle to Asia and the Middle East annually.

In 2011, a 26,000-hectare portion of Iffley Station was sold to Macarthur Coal for a reported $38 million.

In 2012, the Acton's sold their Moray Downs cattle station to Adani Group, an Indian multinational energy and mining conglomerate. The company bought the property, a third of which sits above a huge coal deposit, and plans to use the cattle station for their proposed Carmichael coal mine. The Actons were believed to have sold the 125,000-hectare property to Adani for $110 million, after having originally purchased the property for $7 million twenty years prior. Acton's brother Evan had the biggest stake in the property, and therefore it was he who decided to sell the property. The decision drew criticism from other graziers who had been actively campaigning against coal and gas companies from buying out prime grazing land.

In 2015, Acton Land and Cattle Company sold a controlling interest to Australian Country Choice, which saw the two companies form a new joint venture, a new standalone business called Australian Cattle and Beef Holdings. As part of the deal, Australian Country Choice purchased Barkly Downs and began leasing Millungera Station, Croydon Station, Rugby Run, Iffley Station and Moray Downs for an indefinite period. The two Acton properties near Rockhampton, Paradise Lagoons and Mountain View were not part of the deal.

== Campdrafting ==
Acton had a strong interest in horse racing as his father had once been an amateur jockey. But although Acton himself was also an amateur jockey for a brief period during his younger years he eventually became physically too large to continue riding racehorses so turned his attention to the sport of campdrafting where he was able to compete.

He became a keen promoter and competitor of campdrafting and was credited with helping reinvigorate the sport in Queensland.

In 2001, Acton and purchased "Paradise Lagoons", twelve kilometres east of the entrance to Rockhampton and set to work establishing a $3 million campdrafting complex on the property. The venue was named the Val & Tom Acton MBE Memorial Complex in honour of Acton's parents. It was officially opened by Deputy Prime Minister John Anderson and Australian Campdraft Association President Ed McCormack on 2 May 2003.

The venue is best known for becoming the "spiritual home" of campdrafting by hosting the Paradise Lagoons Campdraft, an annual four-day event which is claimed to be Australia's richest campdraft, where successful competitors share in hundreds of thousands of dollars in prize money.

The Paradise Lagoons Campdraft is also used as a charity fundraiser, benefiting organisations such as the Capricorn Helicopter Rescue Service and the Royal Flying Doctor Service of Australia as well as a number of small local community groups.

Aside from campdrafting, the Paradise Lagoons complex is used as a general purpose function centre for events such as weddings, birthdays, corporate meetings and balls such as Rockhampton's annual Black Dog Ball

Acton was president of the Clarke Creek Campdraft Association for ten years before stepping down from the role in the early 2000s. He is also listed on the Australian Campdraft Association Honour Roll.

== Additional Projects ==
Acton was heavily involved in promoting the triennial Beef Australia exhibition in Rockhampton, and was chairman of the 2000 and 2003 events.

He was also deputy chairman of the Australian Stockman's Hall of Fame in Longreach. In 2016, the chairman of the Stockman's Hall of Fame paid tribute to Acton and said that his vision enabled the funding and provided the blueprint for Longreach's new $2.5 million Outback Entertainment Centre.

Acton also participated in the annual Global Food Forums held in Melbourne and Sydney, in 2013 and 2014.

== Media ==
A 2012 television program called Big Australia, produced by Southern Cross Austereo, which was aired nationally on 7mate, focused on the on-ground and aerial mustering operations on Acton's Millungera cattle station.

Acton was also featured in a three-part BBC One series in 2014 called John Bishop's Australia, presented by English comedian John Bishop, which aired after Acton's death.

ABC Television's national rural affairs program Landline featured Acton a number of times, as part of various discussions concerning the Australian beef industry.

== Rich Lists ==
Due to their wealth, Graeme Acton and his brother Evan regularly featured on annual "rich lists" such as the BRW Rich 200 and The Sunday Mail Top 150 Rich List.

In 2010, the Acton brothers placed at #170 on the BRW Rich 200. They climbed the list the following year to place at #151 in the 2011 BRW Rich 200 list. In 2012, they again ascended up the list to placing at #117. They moved back down the list in 2013 to place at #143. Following Graeme Acton's death in May 2014, his brother Evan Acton solely placed at #176 on that year's list.

== Personal life ==
Acton married Jennifer Beak in 1975, and subsequently had four children – Tom, Victoria, Hayley and Laura. Acton first met his future wife at a bull sale in Gracemere, Queensland in 1970. They later discovered they had been born in the same hospital just hours apart. Throughout the first couple of years of their courtship, they only managed to see each other several times. They almost became engaged in 1972 when Beak proposed to Acton, only for him to turn down the proposal. However, he later sold one of his rifles to enable him to purchase an engagement ring so he could return the proposal. At the time of his death, they had been married for 39 years.

Acton's daughter Tory was a candidate in the 2016 Local Government elections, when she campaigned to represent Division 2 in the Rockhampton Regional Council local government area. Tory Acton was part of a team of candidates that had been assembled by mayoral candidate Michael McMillan. Acton achieved 30.51% of the vote but was defeated by incumbent Neil Fisher who achieved 43.26% of the vote.

== Political views ==
Politically, Graeme Acton seemed to be a conservative and openly supported the Liberal Party of Australia and their leader Tony Abbott. Acton hosted Abbott, who at the time was Federal Opposition Leader, at the Paradise Lagoons Campdraft in 2011 and 2013. Abbott's 2013 visit to Paradise Lagoons coincided with his Federal election campaign for the 2013 Federal Election. Upon Abbott's arrival at the event, Acton introduced him as "the future Prime Minister of Australia". Abbott ultimately became Prime Minister soon after the event, succeeding Kevin Rudd.

In 2013, Acton openly criticised the Beattie and Bligh Labor Queensland governments, accusing them of being unsympathetic to the agricultural industry and food producers, and claimed that he had "battled" with them for twenty years. Acton also lay blame for horse racing in regional Queensland being "decimated" at the hands of state Labor governments, which he believed were responsible for the sport "dying out" in rural areas.

== Death ==
Acton died in Brisbane on 9 May 2014 from severe injuries he sustained on 2 May 2014 when a horse rolled on top of him following a fall while he was competing in the Clarke Creek Autumn Classic Campdraft at Clarke Creek, north of Rockhampton.

After originally being airlifted to Rockhampton Hospital in a serious condition, Acton was transferred to the intensive care unit at the Royal Brisbane and Women's Hospital with critical head and spinal injuries. Although there were signs of slight improvement during his time in hospital, which included being taken off life support and breathing on his own, Acton eventually succumbed to his injuries one week after the accident.

A number of Australian leaders expressed sadness when they learnt of Acton's death, including Prime Minister of Australia Tony Abbott, Minister for Agriculture Barnaby Joyce and Premier of Queensland Campbell Newman who all paid tribute to Acton's contribution to the Australian beef industry.

Acton's funeral was held at his Paradise Lagoons Campdraft Complex.

== Legacy ==
Following Acton's death, a 1200-metre horse race at a race meeting in Middlemount was named the Graeme Acton Memorial Benchmark 55.

A program called Graeme Acton Beef Connections was launched at Rockhampton's triennial Beef Australia exhibition in 2015. The program was developed to mentor and provide training opportunities for young beef producers. It was named in Acton's honour due to his reputation of providing support and mentorship of young people entering the industry.

A hand-woven tapestry portrait of Acton was unveiled at the Rockhampton Art Gallery while the Beef Australia exhibition was being held in the city in 2015. Friends of Acton had the portrait commissioned from the Australian Tapestry Workshop. Former Governor of Queensland, Penelope Wensley AC addressed the guests at the unveiling and said that the portrait captured both the spirit of the country and of Acton himself.

Rockhampton's Central Queensland University posthumously made Acton an Honorary Doctor of the University in 2015, to recognise his role as an ambassador for the Central Queensland region and for the Australian cattle industry in general.

During the 2015 Paradise Lagoons Campdraft, a bronze bust of Graeme Acton at the venue was unveiled by Prime Minister Tony Abbott.
