= Criterion Hotel, Rockhampton =

Criterion Hotel
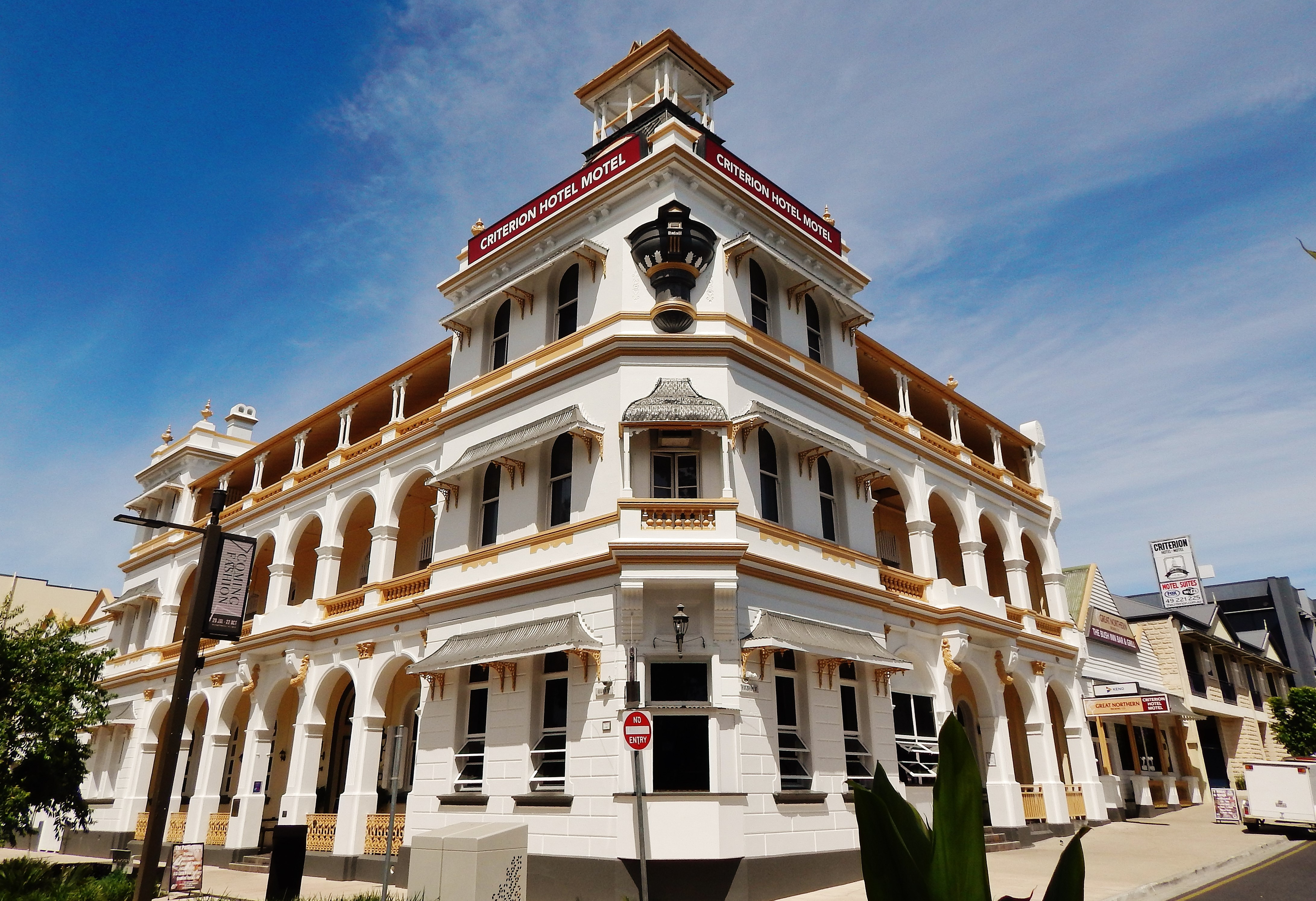
- Criterion Hotel, 2017

- Location within Queensland Location within Australia
- 23.3763°S 150.5132°E
- Location: 150 Quay Street, Rockhampton, Rockhampton Region, Queensland, Australia

History
- Design period: 1870s–1890s (late 19th century)
- Built: 1889–1890

Site notes
- Architect: James Flint

Queensland Heritage Register
- Official name: Criterion Hotel
- Type: state heritage (built)
- Designated: 21 October 1992
- Reference no.: 600800
- Significant period: 1880s (fabric); 1890–ongoing (historical use)
- Significant components: shed – storage, fireplace, chimney/chimney stack, tower, furniture/fittings

Criterion Hotel is a heritage-listed hotel at 150 Quay Street, Rockhampton, Rockhampton Region, Queensland, Australia. It was designed by James Flint and built from 1889 to 1890. It was added to the Queensland Heritage Register on 21 October 1992.

== History ==
The Criterion Hotel is a three-storeyed masonry building situated on the corner of Quay and Fitzroy Streets in Rockhampton. It has formed an integral and vital part of the social and cultural life of the town and City of Rockhampton since 1891.

In 1855 (prior to the separation of Queensland in 1859) the New South Wales Government had requested that William Henry Wiseman the Commissioner for Leichardt, locate a suitable place on the Fitzroy River for a settlement. Rockhampton's name and place had been decided on in 1856 although the settlement was not officially proclaimed a town until 25 October 1858.

In 1857 Mr Palmer erected a store, the first building in Rockhampton. Richard Parker a resident of Gayndah erected the first hotel (or inn) for Rockhampton some six months later. Both Parker and Palmer had erected their buildings on what was crown land. Parker had built the inn opposite to Palmers store, and was in partnership with a man called George Gannon.

Parker and Gannon's establishment was known as the Bush Inn and was constructed of iron-bark slabs and shingle roof. In 1858, the Canoona gold rush rapidly changed the fortune of the Bush Inn. The Bush Inn enjoyed overwhelming patronage and clientele over the four months that the rush lasted.

The Bush Inn was enlarged upon and rebuilt in 1859–60. The rebuilt building was of a single storey. The entrance to the public bar was from the corner of Fitzroy Street and Quay Lane, and the business premises extended along the Quay Lane aspect of the block. The layout of the Bush Inn now included a coffee room approached through a garden, and a billiard room at the Fitzroy Street end of the building.

Parker died in 1860 bequeathing the property to the eldest of his two daughters Dorinda Ann Parker. After his death Parker's widow Maria, kept the Inn going until remarrying with John Watt in 1861. In 1862, the Bush Inn transferred the license to John Ward. Ward changed the name of the establishment from the Bush Inn to the Criterion Hotel. Ward also constructed the Rockhampton Hotel on Victoria Parade, a short distance from the Criterion.

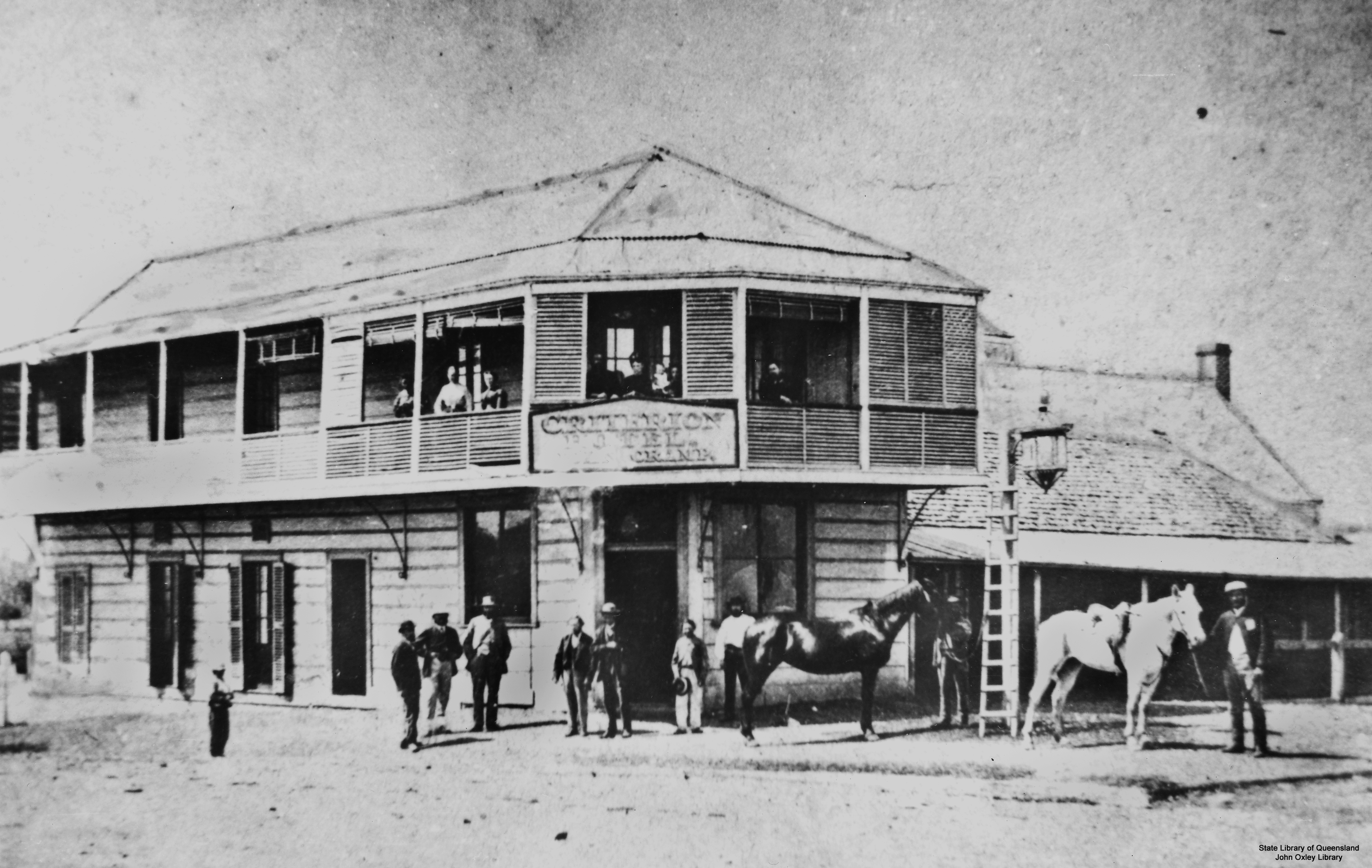
Two-storey weatherboard Criterion Hotel, circa 1873

Ward however did not maintain the licence very long, and before the end of 1862 had transferred it on to Thomas Nobbs. The Criterion was further rebuilt at this stage into a two storeyed weatherboard building with a first floor verandah fronting onto Fitzroy Street.

In 1865 J A Watt died and his widow Maria married John Cramp who was her business manager. In 1866 the lease on the Criterion expired. John Cramp and his wife, Maria took up the licence on the premises. Maria Cramp returned to the hotel owned by her eldest daughter, Dorinda. Maria Cramp kept the premises going with her husband until her own death in 1875, at the age of 39. Dorinda then took over the running of the hotel following the death of her mother. A brick extension was made to the Criterion after its purchase in 1875.

Dorinda Ann Parker in 1874 married George Silas Curtis. Curtis had been born in Tamworth in New South Wales in 1846, and educated at Sydney Boys Grammar. Curtis had first come to Rockhampton in 1863 overland and returned in 1866. He began a business career with the auctioneering firm of Mills Wormald, and after the death of Wormald in 1872 Curtis purchased the business.

Curtis was to become a prominent member of the powerful Rockhampton Chamber of Commerce, and also was to become in the 1890s the leading advocate of the separation movement in central Queensland. The marriage of Curtis to Dorinda Parker began a family association with the Criterion Hotel that was to last until 1947.

One of the licensees of the Criterion Hotel in the period of 1880–3 was Frederick Augustus Morgan who arrived in Rockhampton in 1879, from Bathurst in New South Wales. Morgan had been a gold miner in the Bathurst district. His two brothers Tom and Ned in July 1882 were to credit themselves as locating the ore body on top of Ironstone Mountain in the Dee Range, that became the Mount Morgan Mine.

With the influx of wealth from the rich gold mine of Mount Morgan and with the growth of the importance of Rockhampton as the Port for access to the mine, the role of hotels such as the Criterion increased in the business and trade community.

Dorinda Curtis is credited with being responsible for the decision to construct the grand new three storeyed building at the corner of Quay and Fitzroy Street in 1889. According to J T S Bird in his Early History of Rockhampton, the building was rebuilt "by Mrs. G S Curtis, and the handsome three-storied brick building of the present day is one of the finest hotels in Queensland". Jessica Bloxsom attributes:

The Inn had been reconstructed twice up to then, when Mrs Curtis decided she would erect a fine hotel of stone, brick and marble, making it without doubt the finest hotel in Central Queensland.

It is unsure how much influence that George Curtis had in the business decision to construct the new building. In the rebuilding of the Criterion hotel the local press said that he also had an eye for improving the physical appearance of the town of Rockhampton. This was an ongoing process, with new construction work a physical manifestation of the wealth of Mount Morgan gold and its contribution to the town.

Tenders were called for construction on 5 March 1889. Twelve tenders were received from various contractors in Brisbane, Sydney and Rockhampton. The bid of Robert Kirkham of Sydney for £10 000 was accepted. Construction work began in mid 1889. Completion was expected to take twelve months.

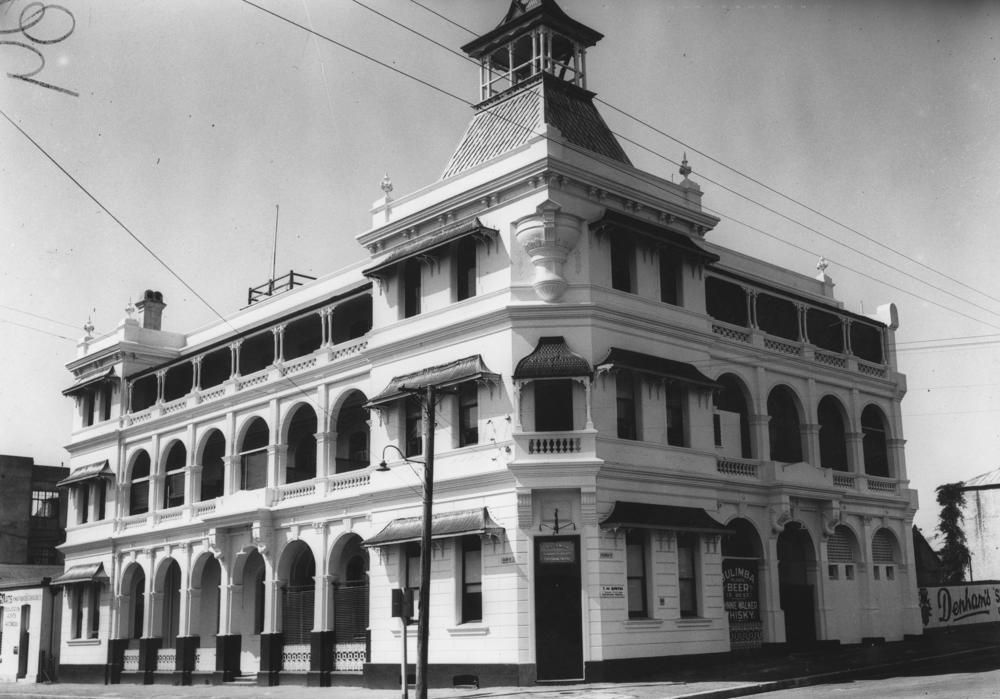
Criterion Hotel, 1948

The design was the work of James Flint, a Yorkshire born architect who had been articled to the Manchester firm of architects, Sherwood and Peverley. Flint had emigrated to Victoria in 1883. In 1887 he moved to Rockhampton to practice as an architect. In the booming economy of Rockhampton and Mount Morgan he designed several notable buildings, including Pinehurst, at Athelstane Range (1893–4), the Walter Reid and Co. Stores (1889) and the Criterion Hotel (1888–9). Importantly the grand new building was situated on a corner location on Quay Street and Fitzroy Street, where its main entrance overlooked the Fitzroy River. The old Criterion Hotel building was retained on its corner of Quay Lane and Fitzroy Street.

On 30 August 1890 when the finishing touches were being put on the building the Capricornian newspaper described the Criterion as being one of the sights of the town:

People competent to judge declare that north of Sydney there is no better hotel to be found and the least that can be said is that there are few that excel it in the colonies. ... The building, which cannot be described as belonging to any particular order of architecture, contains some of the most modern conveniences, including gas lighting and lavatories with ample ventilation.

Provision was also made for the installation of electric lights, and for the eventual inclusion of passenger lifts, which were not installed. The Criterion Hotel design was considered advanced for the period, and was expected to maintain its reputation as the leading hotel of Rockhampton. Its management was also considered the most progressive in Rockhampton.

It was hoped to open the new hotel building on 15 September 1890, in time for carnival week in Rockhampton. The hotel's licence was transferred to the new building on 8 October 1890. A special ball held on 21 October 1890 marked the official opening of the building for trading purposes.

Rockhampton was described in the following terms in 1893 as being well supplied with hotels and places of amusement:

Its leading hotel the Criterion, is the equal of any in Southern Queensland.

The old Criterion Hotel was used for a variety of other purposes including accommodation for travelling salesmen. The ground floor of the former Criterion Hotel was set up as a sample room where salesmen were able to display their wares. It was also rented out for low cost accommodation. In 1957, the centenary year of the Bush Inn the building was sold to Mr. L G Duthie for demolition. The site of the old Criterion was rebuilt as office and shop space.

The Criterion Hotel became well known for the black tie balls and dinner parties that were held within its walls from the turn of the century until the 1950s. It has also hosted many distinguished visitors during its existence including Prince Henry, Duke of Gloucester (when Governor-General), his wife Princess Alice, the former Prime Minister of Australia Sir Robert Menzies, Dame Nellie Melba, Sir Donald Bradman, and Charles Kingsford Smith.

Sporting teams such as the touring English cricket sides have also been accommodated at the Hotel. During the second world war it was commandeered for the use of American service personnel. It also served for a period of time as the headquarters of General Robert L. Eichelberger who was on the staff of General Douglas MacArthur. Eichlelberger commanded over 70 000 American troops stationed within the Rockhampton region.

Until 1946 the Criterion Hotel remained part of the Curtis family estate. The last beneficiary was Ethel Curtis. In 1946, as remaining beneficiary of the estate Ethel sold the Criterion Hotel to Henry Smith. The Criterion Hotel was the only property in the city that remained in possession of the one family, being inherited from father, to daughter and on to grand daughter.

In 1950 the licence was brought by Charles Bloxsom and his wife Jessica. Jessica described the building as it was in 1950:

This charming historic building, very compact in design, three storeys high, sitting on the bank of the Fitzroy River had forty-two bedrooms covering the two upper floors. The majority of these rooms each had a small balcony overlooking the river, then across to the Berserker Mountains.

The main entrance to the hotel was from Quay Street, up three welcoming marble steps to large double doors of cedar with elaborate brass handles and plates... the large foyer magnificent with its marble floor of large black and white diamonds. The ornate ...grand staircase of red cedar, the stained glass windows on each landing allowing light ...to flow through. To the right from the foyer, the ballroom highly polished floor, cedar tables, chairs and piano. To the left the dining room. Enter here by two sets of cedar doors, brass handles and plates with frosted glass inset saying dining room. The seating accommodation could be up to one hundred guests... Two large pillars in the centre of the room reaching to an unbelievable height; a fireplace, many arched windows overlooking the river.

The ground floor also accommodated the office reception area, the control area of the whole establishment, the large bar, a very small private lounge, a tropical lounge, staff dining area, pantry kitchen...added to these were a series of small rooms enveloping the main building in an L shape; food store room, liquor store room, furniture store room, hot water system...laundry, ironing room, sample rooms and lastly the old building [Criterion Hotel/Bush Inn] on the corner of the property.

Detached by ten feet from the hotel building we had staff quarters which were part of the original structure. There were six small rooms here, with bath and toilet downstairs.

A 1955 aerial photograph shows the Criterion Hotel a corner entrance to the public bar and two one storeyed buildings on the south-western side of the hotel which extend from Quay Street to Quay Lane. From one of these buildings projects a brick chimney shaft in the same position of the extant chimney in 1996. As well, the earlier hotel a two storeyed building is evident on the corner of Quay Lane and Fitzroy Street.

The Bloxsoms kept the licence of the Criterion Hotel until 1960. In this period major changes were undertaken in the hotel. Much of the furniture was worn out as well as the hotel linen. The Bloxsoms intention at this time was to make the Criterion a more upmarket place of accommodation. The Bloxsoms lease on the property expired in 1960.

The property was sold to the sons of Henry Smith and their sister Joan Johnston in 1966. From 1960 until 1981 under the ownership of the Smith family alterations were made to the building have including the construction of a motel unit complex on the southern side of the hotel, facing Quay Street. This was the first hotel-motel unit arrangement in Rockhampton. The first steak house in central Queensland was also opened on the hotel premises.

Other internal alterations have been made to the building including the refurbishment of the public bar on the corner of Fitzroy Street and Quay Street. The major change was the closing off of the public bar's entry from the truncated corner of the building at the corner of Fitzroy Street and Quay Street, and the removal of the bar's bat swing entry doors.

The Smith connection with the Criterion Hotel ended with the death of Les Smith in 1979. The business was auctioned off in 1981, and Keith Smith and his wife remained on as joint managers. In July 1981 the hotel was bought by members of the Balkin and Melit families. Previously at auction the business had been passed in for $575 000.

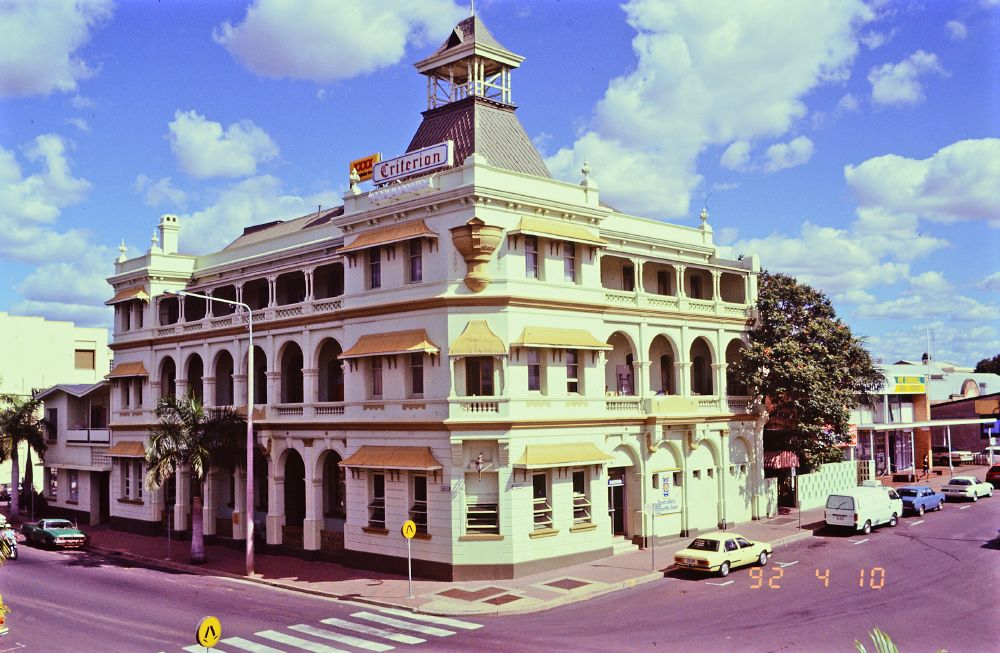
Criterion Hotel in 1992

The Criterion was remodelled to give it a French theme similar to the Bonaparte's Hotel and restaurant in Brisbane owned by the Balkin's. $200 000 was spent on refurbishments, including reconstruction of accommodation areas, the remodelling of the steakhouse (being renamed Bonaparte's Theatre Restaurant), and the former Riverview Restaurant which then traded as Josephine's French restaurant. The hotel was renamed Bonaparte's Criterion hotel. In July 1982 a newsroom bar was opened for the clientele of The Morning Bulletin newspaper. Additional renovations have been carried out in 1989–90 in preparation to celebrate the centenary of the opening of the Criterion Hotel.

The beer garden at the rear of the building was demolished in 1995 by the owner so a new roofed over beer garden/ entertainment venue could be added. Following approval the new addition was added and opened in 1996. The new structure abuts the rear wall of the hotel and in keeping with the historical development of the location was called the Bush Inn.

== Description ==
The Criterion Hotel is a substantial three storeyed rendered brick building, situated prominently on the corner of Quay and Fitzroy Streets, Rockhampton. On the site as well as the hotel is an extension to the south west of the building, fronting Fitzroy Street and a semi-detached extension to the south east fronting Quay Street. To the rear of this extension, along the south east property line are early storage sheds and an early brick chimney.

The Criterion Hotel has elaborate facades facing both Quay and Fitzroy Streets. The early section of the hotel has a rectangular plan with principal entrance from Quay Street. The facades are lined with verandahs which are terminated and align with corner bays. Emphasising the corner of the building and the former, no longer extant, entrance to the public bar is a timber framed tower.

The Quay Street facade of the building comprises three levels of verandahs flanked by the end bays of the building. The ground floor verandah is lined with a rendered brick six bay arcade with full length openings with cast iron balustrading between the openings. The round headed arched openings are separated with shallow partly reeded pilasters. The verandah on the first floor level also features an arcade, though of shorter dimensions and with openings linked with an Italianate balustrade. The second floor verandah continues the rhythm established by the floors below but in the form of a series of paired columns surmounting a masonry balustrade, the sections between the columns of which are filled with a decorative panels of linked circular motifs. The symmetrically arranged end bays feature a pair of arched window openings on each floor shaded by convex corrugated iron awnings. Surmounting the facade of the building is a parapet concealing the roof on which are placed blocks and vases on each corner of the end bays. The line of the floors is expressed externally with a substantial string course continuing along the entire length of the facade of the building.

The Fitzroy Street facade of the Criterion Hotel is similar in detail to the Quay Street facade, though the verandah terminates at a return wall rather than at a bay on the south west end. The arcades are four bays in length and the arcade on the ground floor has been infilled with glazed and brick panels. Adjoining the south west external wall is a recent one storeyed extension with gabled roof.

The corner of the building, addressing the corner of Fitzroy and Quay Streets is one of the most prominent features. This bay is truncated and the doorway which was originally at the ground floor level has been partly infilled and is now a window. Above the window and formed by a shelf over the ground floor opening is a small rectangular Juliet balcony with Italianate balustrading. This has an ogee curved awning of Wunderlich decorative metal sheeting. Above this is another moulded element, a semicircular bracket which provides a transitional element between the corner of the building and the truncation. Surmounting this corner bay is a mansard roof clad with decorative metal sheeting and surmounting this is a timber framed tower/observatory with a steeply pitched pyramidal roof also clad with decorative metal.

Access is provided to the building from Quay Street, through the ground floor verandah to a grand entrance doorway with sidelights and a large framed semi-circular fanlight. The double entrance doors are many panelled and are pieces of fine quality timber craftsmanship.

Generally, the interior of the Criterion Hotel has many early features. The walls and ceilings are plastered on the ground floor with plaster walls and timber boarded ceilings on the floors above. High quality joinery - architraves, skirting and doors - is used throughout and much of this survives intact. Chimney pieces survive intact with timber surrounds and mantle, tiled or marble panels and cast iron fittings.

From the entrance door access is provided to a small entrance vestibule on the north west of which is a small office fitted with an early chimney place and to the south east is a ticket window. Separated from the entrance vestibule by an archway is a grand foyer space at the opposite end to the door of which is the stair. The floor of the vestibule and foyer is covered with alternating black and white marble tiles with coloured tessellated tile borders. Two sets of swing doors line the side walls of this space providing access to the public bar and function room to the north west and the dining room to the south east. These door have etched glass panels with lettering displaying the original purpose of the room to which they provide access. The public bar and other rooms to the north west have been heavily altered and have very few intact early features.

The dining room is a large open space, with two tall cast iron supporting columns, with Corinthian capitals in the centre of the room. Early fireplaces with face brick shafts and marble chimney pieces are features of the room. The dining room has many round headed arched windows providing daylight and ventilation. The arched section of these openings is filled with fine stained glass panels.

The stair hall, centrally located on the south west end of the building, in a semi circular recess, has a fine bi-furcating stair, turning 180 degrees and dividing at the landing between the floors and arriving at the next floor in two sections on either side of the central larger section. The stair has a continual handrail of fine quality craftsmanship. The stair hall has two sets of three arched window openings, filled with coloured and translucent glass.

The first floor is reached by the central stair which provides access to a stair vestibule, defined by segmental plaster archways resting on plaster corbels on the walls. These archways continue throughout the floor, defining the extent of the hallways.

The top floor of the building has a similar plan to that of the second floor, with halls running parallel to Quay Street from the stair foyer, and then parallel to Fitzroy Street at the ends of the buildings. From the halls access is provided to the many bedrooms. This floor is less ornate than the first floor and the timber boarded ceilings are slightly lower. The rooms facing Quay Street have access to the second floor verandah through half glazed French doors. The verandah awning is ceiled with fibrous cement sheeting. Except for the stair area there are no overhead archways and very simple cornices and skirtings on this floor.

Lightly attached to the south east of the building, with an overpass over a narrow lane is a two storeyed motel extension of brick veneer construction and very shallow gabled roof. To the rear of this is a timber framed and corrugated iron clad storage shed, in the centre of which is a large deteriorated brick chimney shaft and oven.

== Heritage listing ==
Criterion Hotel was listed on the Queensland Heritage Register on 21 October 1992 having satisfied the following criteria.

The place is important in demonstrating the evolution or pattern of Queensland's history.

The Criterion Hotel building illustrates the growth of Rockhampton in the late 1880s as result of the wealth generated by the Mount Morgan Mine. The Criterion Hotel forms an integral part of the historical development of the City of Rockhampton being located near the site of the first public inn established in the embryonic settlement.

The place has potential to yield information that will contribute to an understanding of Queensland's history.

The Criterion Hotel site has the potential to yield evidence of earlier occupation as the site of licensed premises in Rockhampton for 140 years.

The place is important in demonstrating the principal characteristics of a particular class of cultural places.

The building demonstrates the principal characteristics of a large masonry hotel built in the 1880s in a regional Queensland town designed both as local landmark to attract regular custom, and as superior accommodation to attract country and family visitors. It remains substantially intact, and is a good illustration of its type in both design and function.

The place is important because of its aesthetic significance.

The Criterion Hotel is a substantial building which makes a strong contribution to the Rockhampton townscape and to Quay Street. It occupies a prominent position on Quay Street and is a local landmark. The building has many well crafted internal features including high quality joinery, a fine stair, plaster work, stained glass panels and chimney pieces.

The place has a strong or special association with a particular community or cultural group for social, cultural or spiritual reasons.

The Criterion Hotel is valued by the local community of Rockhampton as a centre of social activity for over a century.

The place has a special association with the life or work of a particular person, group or organisation of importance in Queensland's history.

It is significant for its association with the Rockhampton architect James Flint, who also designed the Rockhampton Club building.
