= Ben Goodson =

Australian cyclist and singer (1878–1941)

Benjamin Goodson
- Born: Benjamin Goodson; 21 July 1878; England
- Died: 6 June 1941 (aged 62); Vaucluse, New South Wales, Australia
- Occupations: Cyclist; baritone
- Years active: 1899–1940s

Benjamin Goodson (21 July 1878 – 6 June 1941) was an Australian cyclist and baritone singer.

== Early life ==
Goodson arrived in Rockhampton, Queensland, with his parents as a small boy in 1883 aboard the ship Melpomene, when the family migrated to Australia from England.

When Goodson's father, William Henry Goodson, died in 1899, Goodson went into partnership with his brother Harry as they took over the family's furniture dealing, upholstering and mattress, and futon making business in Rockhampton. They moved into their own shop in 1907, but following their mother's death in 1918, they dissolved the partnership in 1919, enabling Harry to take on the business. Harry, upon his retirement in 1934, handed the business over to his two sons before it was sold.

== Cycling career ==
At the age of 14, Goodson began his cycling career in Rockhampton on a borrowed bicycle when he won nine events during a two-day event in December 1894 in which he and his brother competed. Following the event, Goodson continued his cycling success in Rockhampton, which included winning 14 handicaps in succession.

After his father acquired a special Rover racer from England, Goodson continued his wins, and in 1895, he won the Mile Championship of Central Queensland, the 5-mile Queensland Championship, and the 2-mile Championship of Central Queensland, all in one afternoon. In 1896, Goodson travelled to Brisbane to compete against Australia's best cyclists in a three-mile handicap where he placed a close second. He then represented Queensland in Sydney later the same year where he competed in five test races vying to be selected for the International Cyclists' Association World's Championships in Glasgow, an event organised by the Scottish Cyclists' Union as part of celebrations honouring the long reign of Queen Victoria. Goodson secured the most points during the Sydney meet resulting in his selection to go to Glasgow.

In 1897, Goodson travelled to England to compete in a meet at Birmingham, which was held in July of that year, before the World Championships in Scotland the following month. Although he and his fellow Australian competitor Walter Kerr won several heats at Birmingham, they were beaten in the final.

Goodson and Kerr were also unsuccessful at the World Championships in Glasgow despite showing promising form by winning several heats. However, Goodson was successful at a meet in August 1897 at Celtic Park, Glasgow, winning the three mile scratch event.

Goodson's success in Australia continued in 1898 when he again travelled to Sydney to compete in the New South Wales Cyclist Union's Australasian Championship, which was held at the Sydney Cricket Ground. Goodson prevailed as the champion, but his win was overshadowed when another rider, James Tooher, was killed after falling from his bike during the first heat of the 2-Mile Handicap, causing other riders to fall and ride over the seriously injured cyclist.

In 1899, Goodson again secured the most points against Australian riders while competing for selection for the World Championships in Montreal. Goodson had some success in Canada, winning the five-mile handicap from scratch while placing second in other events. While in Canada, Goodson also competed in the World's Long Distance Championship which was a paced event over 100 kilometres. During this event, Goodson became engaged in a competitive battle with the American Johnny Nelson. The two cyclists fought hard against each other, so much so that they both broke the world's one-hour record before Nelson ultimately gained the winning lead.

Goodson then travelled to Boston to compete in the American amateur championships where he won the quarter-mile, one-third mile and half-mile events, placed second in the five-mile event and placed third in the one-mile event. Based on the points he accumulated, Goodson was declared the champion.

Goodson retired from cycling in 1905.

== Entertainment career ==
=== Vaudeville ===
Goodson was noted for being a baritone vocalist and toured Australia professionally with various concert companies, including the Harry Rickards Company.

=== Goodson's Promenade Concert Grounds ===
Along with his brother and business partner Harry, Goodson opened Rockhampton's first open air picture theatre as Goodson's Promenade Concert Grounds in 1909.

When the venture struggled, the brothers closed the site, enabling local hotelier George Birch to acquire the grounds and improve the venue to reopen it as "Earl's Court". Purchasing the site enabled Birch to strengthen his business relationship with Brisbane film exhibitors, brothers E. J. and Dan Carroll, which ultimately led to the formation of the Birch, Carroll & Coyle cinema chain, with Townsville's Virgil Coyle eventually joining the business as a partner.

=== Ben Goodson's Concert Company ===
Following the failure of concert grounds, Goodson established Ben Goodson's Concert Company to provide orchestral music to small towns within the Rockhampton region. The company's first concert was at Westwood, Queensland, before hosting other events at Mt Chalmers and Stanwell.

== Personal life ==
=== Marriage ===
Goodson married Mabel Cooper in Inverell, New South Wales, in 1901, where Cooper's father Robert had a jeweller's shop. She died at the age of 87 in Vaucluse, New South Wales, in September 1964.

=== Death of son ===
Goodson's son Benares Hampton Goodson was killed along with four others when the plane he was piloting crashed near Innisfail, Queensland, in 1938. Benares had gained his pilot's licence ten years prior to the accident, owned his own plane and was a member of the Rockhampton Aero Club, acting as an assistant instructor after gaining the appropriate qualifications. Four years prior to the fatal crash, Benares was appointed by Charles Kingsford Smith to be chief instructor of the Kingsford Smith Flying School, just prior to Kingsford Smith's own disappearance.

=== Brother's public service ===
Goodson's brother, Harry Goodson, was involved in public life and was active in the Rockhampton community, where he was a member of the Rockhampton Harbour Board, an alderman on Rockhampton City Council, and a life member of the Rockhampton Agricultural Society. Ben and Harry were business partners taking over their late father's furniture dealing business and establishing what was Rockhampton's first open-air picture theatre when they opened the Goodson's Promenade Concert Grounds in 1909. Harry Goodson died in Yeppoon in 1944; Goodson Street in the Rockhampton suburb of West Rockhampton is named in his honour.

== Death ==
Goodson died at the age of 62 on 6 June 1941 at his home at Vaucluse, New South Wales.
