= Kenmore House, Rockhampton =

Heritage mansion in Rockhampton, Queensland, Australia

Kenmore House
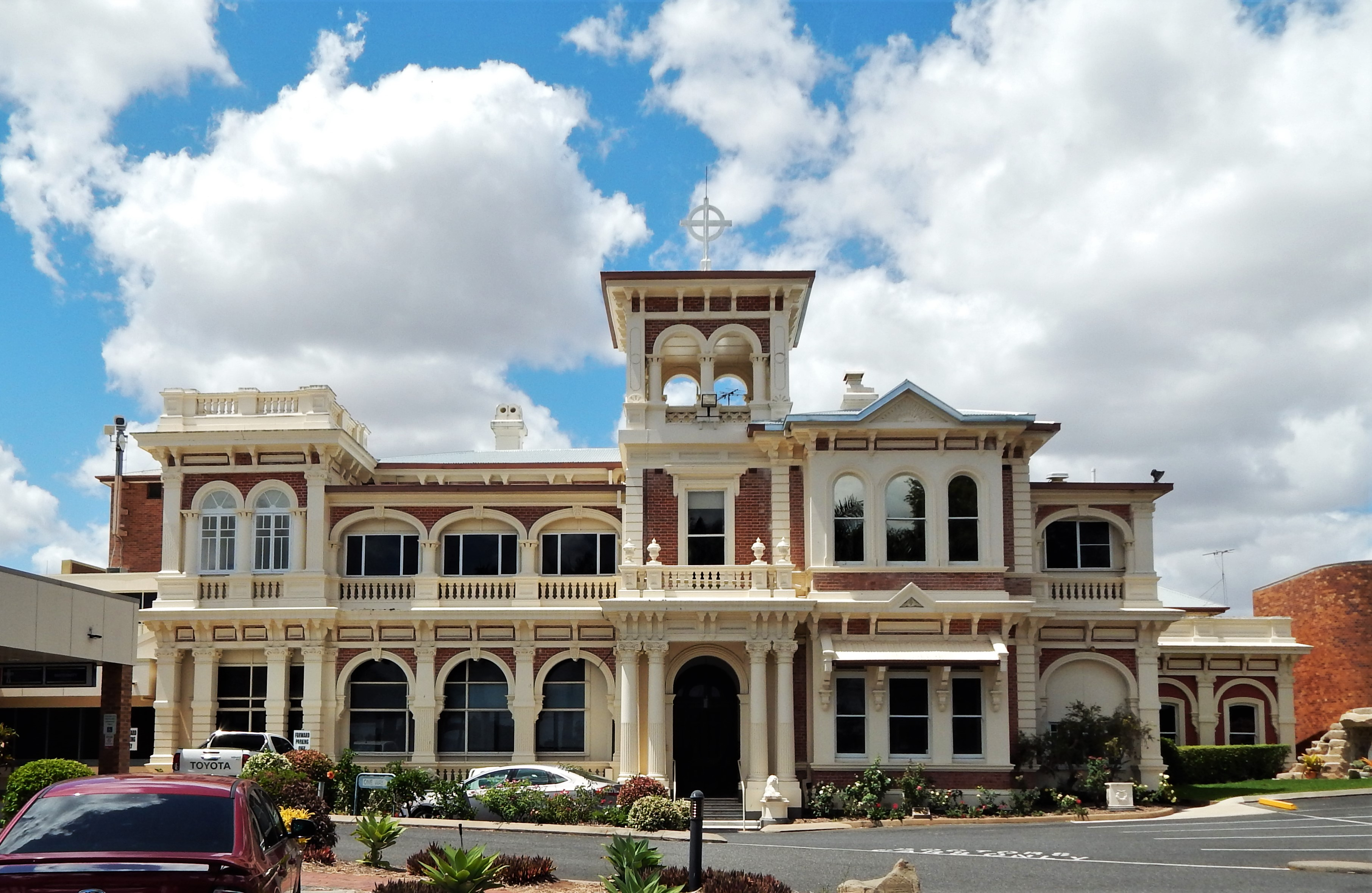
- Kenmore House, 2019

- Location within Queensland Location within Australia
- 23.3981°S 150.4975°E
- Location: 31 Ward Street, The Range, Rockhampton, Rockhampton Region, Queensland, Australia

History
- Design period: 1870s–1890s (late 19th century)
- Built: c. 1894

Site notes
- Architect: James Flint (attributed)

Queensland Heritage Register
- Official name: Kenmore House, Mater Misericordiae Hospital, Pinehurst, The Mansion
- Type: state heritage (landscape, built)
- Designated: 21 October 1992
- Reference no.: 600820
- Significant period: 1890s (fabric); 1894–1904 (historical); 1915 (social)
- Significant components: portico, service wing, tower – observation/lookout, residential accommodation – main house, canteen, gate – entrance, trees/plantings, ballroom, loggia/s

Kenmore House is a heritage-listed mansion at 31 Ward Street, The Range, Rockhampton, Rockhampton Region, Queensland, Australia. The design is attributed to James Flint and it was built from c. 1894 onwards. It is also known as Mater Misericordiae Hospital, Pinehurst and The Mansion. It was added to the Queensland Heritage Register on 21 October 1992.

== History ==
Kenmore House is a two storeyed brick building erected c. 1894 as a residence for John Ferguson on the Athelstane Range overlooking Rockhampton. Its design is attributed to Rockhampton architect, James Flint.

Ferguson arrived in Rockhampton during the 1860s and quickly established himself as a builder and contractor. In 1884, he purchased a large share in the Mount Morgan mine, becoming very wealthy when the public company was floated. In 1888, he retired from building. Ferguson served on the Rockhampton Municipal Council from 1878 to 1890, becoming Mayor in 1880–81 and 1882–83. From 1881 to 88 he was the local Member of the Queensland Legislative Assembly, and from 1894 to 1906 he was a Member of the Queensland Legislative Council. In 1901, he was elected a Senator in the first Australian federal parliament.

"Honest John" Ferguson (as he was known) was also the President of the Central Queensland Separation League, founded in 1890. Kenmore, which reputedly cost £15,000, was according to traditions intended as a future government house for the new state. After meeting with British officials in London in 1892 as a delegate of the Separation League, Ferguson reputedly ordered monogrammed china and gold plate for the future official residence. Known locally as the "Mansion", the house was set in ten acres of land laid out with ornamental trees and gardens including rose trellises, hedges, and pergolas, Norfolk pines, a tamarind tree, and mango trees. The house contained a ballroom tiled with locally quarried black and white marble and a reception hall on the first floor. In 1894 it was described as one of the finest homes in Queensland with few equals in any of the colonies of Australia. At this time the house may have been named Pinehurst, although by 1896 it was known as Kenmore, the name of Ferguson's birthplace in Scotland. In 1894, after the death of architect Flint, tenders were called by Eaton and Bates for the erection of two sets of grand entrance gates.

From c. 1904, Ferguson's brother-in-law, David Wiley, and his family resided at the house. After the death of Ferguson in 1906, the house was sold to pastoralist Stuart McDonald, whose family lived there until 1915, when it was sold to the Sisters of Mercy for £4,500 for use as a hospital. The sale included Kenmore House together with the three and a half acres in which it stood including the whole of the gardens and tennis court. A lower paddock was retained by the McDonald's and a house later erected on that site. On 14 November, the Mater Misericordiae Hospital was officially opened.

In 1940, a new maternity wing designed by Donoghue and Fulton was erected on the eastern side of Kenmore. After the opening in 1959 of a new convent and chapel, the upper rooms of Kenmore were converted into wards and nursing accommodation. After the opening of a new building in 1985, Kenmore became the administrative core of the hospital and a radiography and outpatients unit was established there. The upper floor houses a number of retired nuns and the Sisters' heritage centre.

== Description ==
Kenmore House, located on a northeast sloping site on the Athelstane Range, is a two-storeyed residence and administration centre built of Flemish bond brickwork with rendered detailing and a hipped corrugated iron roof. The asymmetrically massed building shows Classical influences in its design, including a Corinthian columned portico on the north with a tower above, large cornice, arcaded loggias, quoining, pilasters, projecting bays, bracketed eaves and rendered balustrade.

The arcaded loggias have been enclosed on both floors with partition walls and windows set back from the arches. The single-storeyed former hospital reception area is attached as a lean-to on the northeast with a brick hydraulic lift shaft standing proud of the building's facade and a glass walkway linked to the first floor. A planted courtyard surrounds the eastern bay with the former ambulance bay at the southeast. A two-storeyed brick medical centre is attached via a covered ramp to the west of the building.

A single-storeyed steel framed laundry shed is attached to the rear of the building to the south. A two-storeyed masonry kitchen wing can be seen at the rear of the building, with a two-storeyed toilet block attached on the east side and a laundry and accommodation addition to the west.

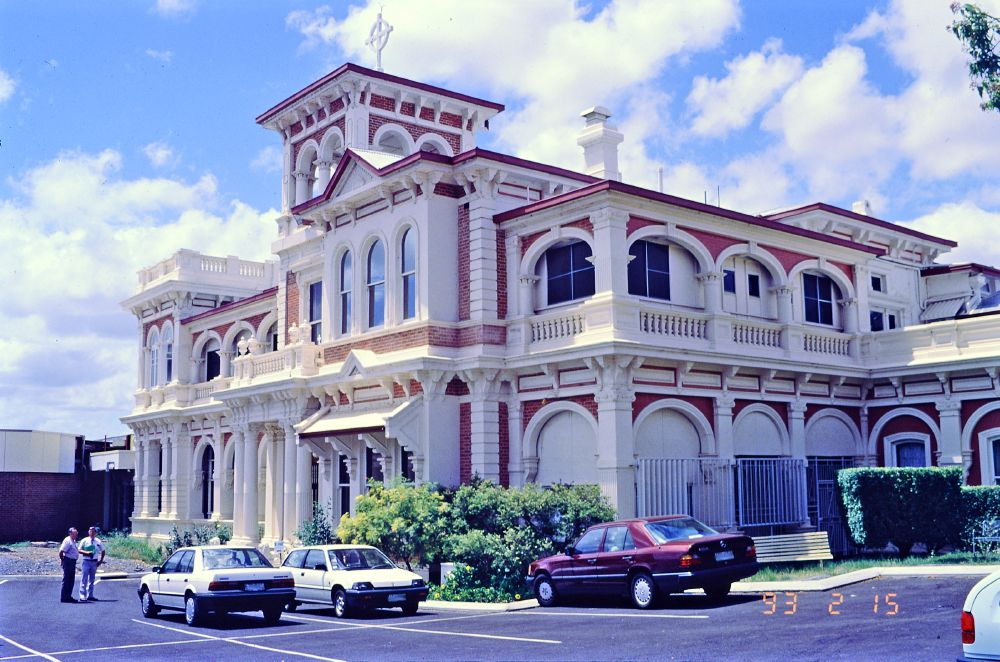
Kenmore House in 1993

Internally, the north entrance leads into a large, columned central hall containing a carved cedar staircase with a twin return and a large stained glass window, ornate plaster ceilings, marble floors with decorative tiled borders and converted gas lanterns. The front and rear entries feature an arched fanlight and sidelights of etched glass, with panelled doors to principal rooms featuring carved cedar pediments and architraves. Principal rooms have been subdivided into offices, but retain fireplace surrounds and joinery. Most rooms have false ceilings and air conditioning has been installed. The rear of the building has been altered, with a large laundry area being created within the original kitchen wing and later additions.

The first floor contains the Sisters' living quarters with bedrooms and a museum in the main house, and bathrooms, bedrooms and a communal room above the kitchen and laundry at the rear. The two-storeyed timber, former canteen building is linked to this level at the southwest via an enclosed verandah above a rear service entrance.

The north grounds, bounded by the recent hospital extensions to the northeast and the two-storeyed brick medical centre to the west, include a large Tamarind Tree to the northwest surrounded by bitumen carpark. The original banded, rendered brick entrance gate posts with wrought iron gates and balustrade, stand at the northwest corner of the site. Two large pine trees are located to the rear of the gates.

== Heritage listing ==
Kenmore House was listed on the Queensland Heritage Register on 21 October 1992 having satisfied the following criteria.

The place is important in demonstrating the evolution or pattern of Queensland's history.

Kenmore House, erected c. 1894, is important in demonstrating the pattern of Queensland's history, in particular the development of Rockhampton and Central Queensland, particularly after the establishment of the Mount Morgan Mine. It is also significant for its association with the longstanding role of the Sisters of Mercy and their Mater Misericordiae Hospitals in the state's health system.

The place is important in demonstrating the principal characteristics of a particular class of cultural places.

The place is important in demonstrating the principal characteristics of a late 19th century villa residence.

The place is important because of its aesthetic significance.

It exhibits a range of aesthetic characteristics valued by the community, in particular the asymmetrical massing of the building's classical elements; the contribution of building and grounds to the streetscape of Ward Street and to the Rockhampton townscape; and the quality of the building's interior, including the timber joinery, plasterwork, and floor finishes.

The place has a strong or special association with a particular community or cultural group for social, cultural or spiritual reasons.

It has a special association with the community of the Sisters of Mercy and the Mater Misericordiae Hospital since 1915, and with Rockhampton as a historic landmark for the city and district.

The place has a special association with the life or work of a particular person, group or organisation of importance in Queensland's history.

It has a special association with the life and work of people of importance in Queensland's history, in particular John Ferguson, builder, businessman, politician and separationist; Rockhampton architect James Flint; and the Sisters of Mercy.
