= Fitzroy Bridge (opened 1952) =

Fitzroy Bridge (1952)
- Coordinates: 23°22′29″S 150°30′53″E
- Carries: Fitzroy Street (Motor vehicles, pedestrian)
- Crosses: Fitzroy River
- Locale: Rockhampton, Central Queensland, Australia
- Begins: Rockhampton City
- Ends: North Rockhampton
- Named for: Fitzroy River
- Preceded by: Neville Hewitt Bridge
- Followed by: Fitzroy Bridge (demolished)

Characteristics
- Total length: 369 metres (1,210 ft)
- Width: 6 metres (20 ft)
- Longest span: 60 metres (198 ft)
- No. of spans: 7

History
- Construction start: 29 September 1945
- Opened: 27 September 1952
- Replaces: Fitzroy Bridge
- Replaced by: Neville Hewitt Bridge

Location
- Interactive map of Fitzroy Bridge (1952)

The Fitzroy Bridge is a road bridge spanning the Fitzroy River in Rockhampton, Queensland, Australia.

== History ==
Construction on the bridge commenced on 29 September 1945 when Rockhampton Mayor Henry Jeffries turned the first sod to mark the start of the construction period. It was officially opened by Queensland Premier Vince Gair on 27 September 1952 when an all-day event was held on and around the bridge, which attracted more than 30,000 people.

The first traffic accident on the bridge was recorded three hours after the bridge was open, when a girl was hit by a car crossing the bridge. The result of her injuries were not life-threatening.

== Description ==
The bridge is 370 metres (1,210 ft) in length between abutments, with a 70-metre (230 ft) southern approach and a 315-metre (1,033 ft) northern approach. The bridge consists of seven spans carrying a 12.8-metre-wide (42 ft) roadway with two 1.5-metre-wide (5 ft) pedestrian walkways on either side.

The Fitzroy Bridge replaced the original Fitzroy Bridge which had served the city since 1881. When the new bridge was opened, the original bridge was closed but it remained unused alongside the new bridge until it was demolished in January 1956.

Linking Rockhampton City with Berserker, the Fitzroy Bridge connects Fitzroy Street with Toft Street, passing over Victoria Parade, Reaney Street, Ashney Street and the Lakes Creek railway line. In 2018, Australian Iranian artist Niloufar Lovegrove painted a mural in the Victoria Parade underpass incorporating local themes.

The Fitzroy Bridge was the only road traffic bridge crossing the Fitzroy River in Rockhampton until the Neville Hewitt Bridge was opened 650 metres (2,133 ft) upstream in 1980.

The 60th anniversary of the bridge's opening was commemorated in 2012.

The Fitzroy Bridge is known for its noticeable "bounce", which was first observed on the night it was opened when thousands of people were dancing on the bridge while an orchestra played music. At the time, local newspaper The Morning Bulletin reported that the bridge "literally bounced in time with the rhythmic tread of thousands of dancing feet". In 2014, the Department of Transport and Main Roads assured residents that is normal for the bridge to have deflection or bend to manage the weight and movement of the traffic.

The bridge has been used as a focal point for various celebrations. Each July, an annual march occurs on the bridge as part of NAIDOC Week celebrations.

During the 2010s, Rockhampton Regional Council began placing a single illuminated Christmas banner on the eastern side of the Fitzroy Bridge each December, and has expressed interest in extending that to all-year decorative coloured flood lighting.

Increasing traffic on the bridge is contributing to an increase in frequency of traffic accidents. There have also been instances when heavy vehicles have become wedged in the bridge's underpasses.

There have also been concerns raised about the safety of cyclists who use the Fitzroy Bridge.

== See also ==
- Fitzroy Bridge
- Alexandra Railway Bridge
- Neville Hewitt Bridge
