= Neville Hewitt Bridge =

Concrete road bridge in Rockhampton, Queensland, Australia

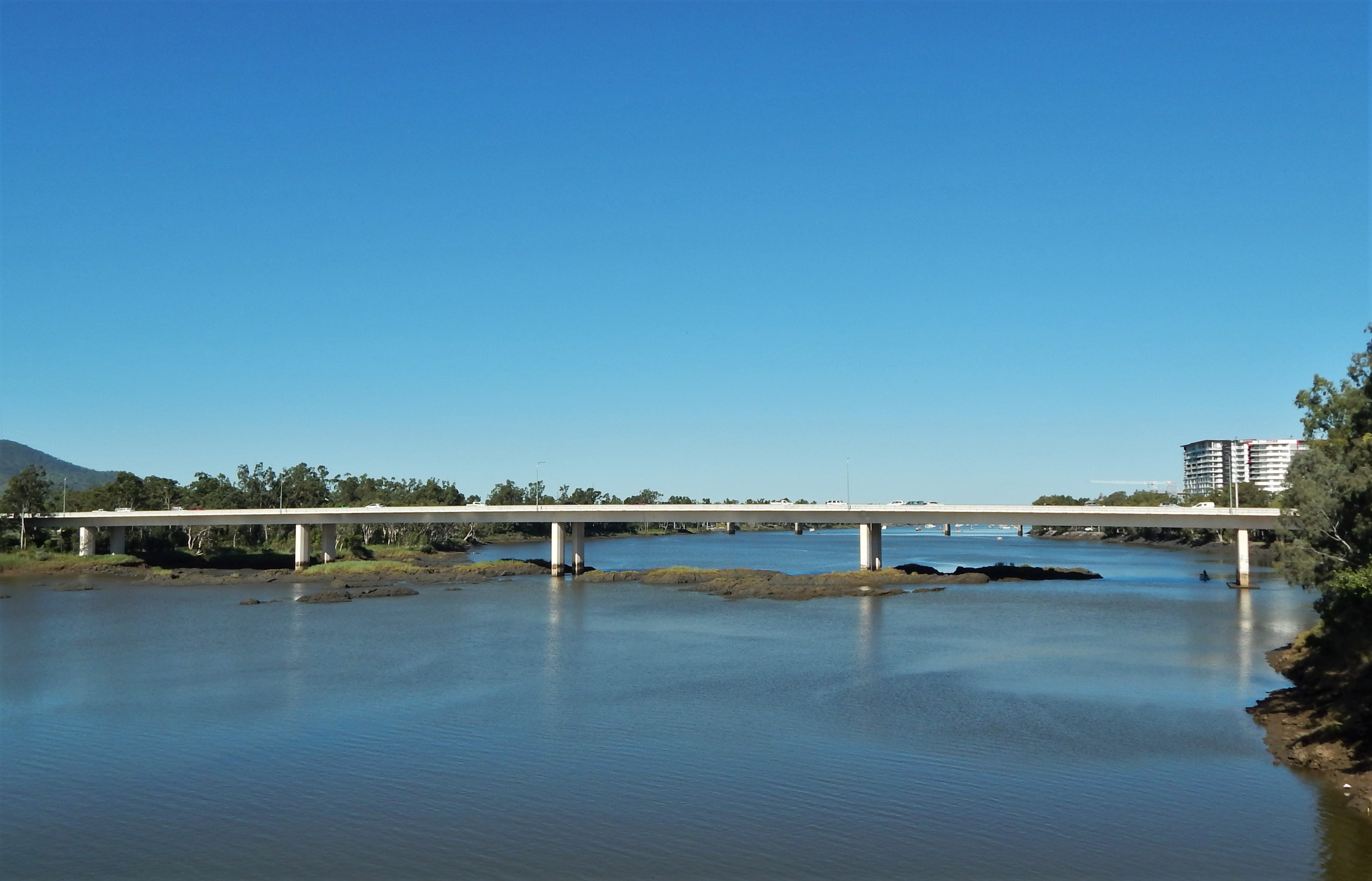
- The bridge in 2020
- Coordinates: 23°22′13″S 150°30′36″E
- Carries: Bruce Highway; motor vehicles, cyclists and pedestrians
- Crosses: Fitzroy River
- Locale: Rockhampton, Central Queensland, Australia
- Begins: Rockhampton City
- Ends: North Rockhampton
- Named for: Neville Hewitt
- Preceded by: Alexandra Railway Bridge
- Followed by: Fitzroy Bridge (1952)

Characteristics
- Material: Concrete

History
- Opened: 16 August 1980
- Replaces: Fitzroy Bridge (1952)

Statistics
- Daily traffic: 36,000 (2016)

Location
- Interactive map of Neville Hewitt Bridge

The Neville Hewitt Bridge is a concrete road bridge that carries the Bruce Highway across the Fitzroy River in Rockhampton, Queensland, Australia. The bridge was officially opened by Queensland premier Sir Joh Bjelke-Petersen on 16 August 1980, and named in honour of long-serving local politician Neville Hewitt who served as the Minister for Lands, Forestry and Water Resources.

== Overview ==
The Neville Hewitt Bridge is the fourth bridge constructed across the Fitzroy at Rockhampton, following the completion of the original Fitzroy Bridge in 1881, the Alexandra Railway Bridge in 1899 and the second Fitzroy Bridge in 1952.

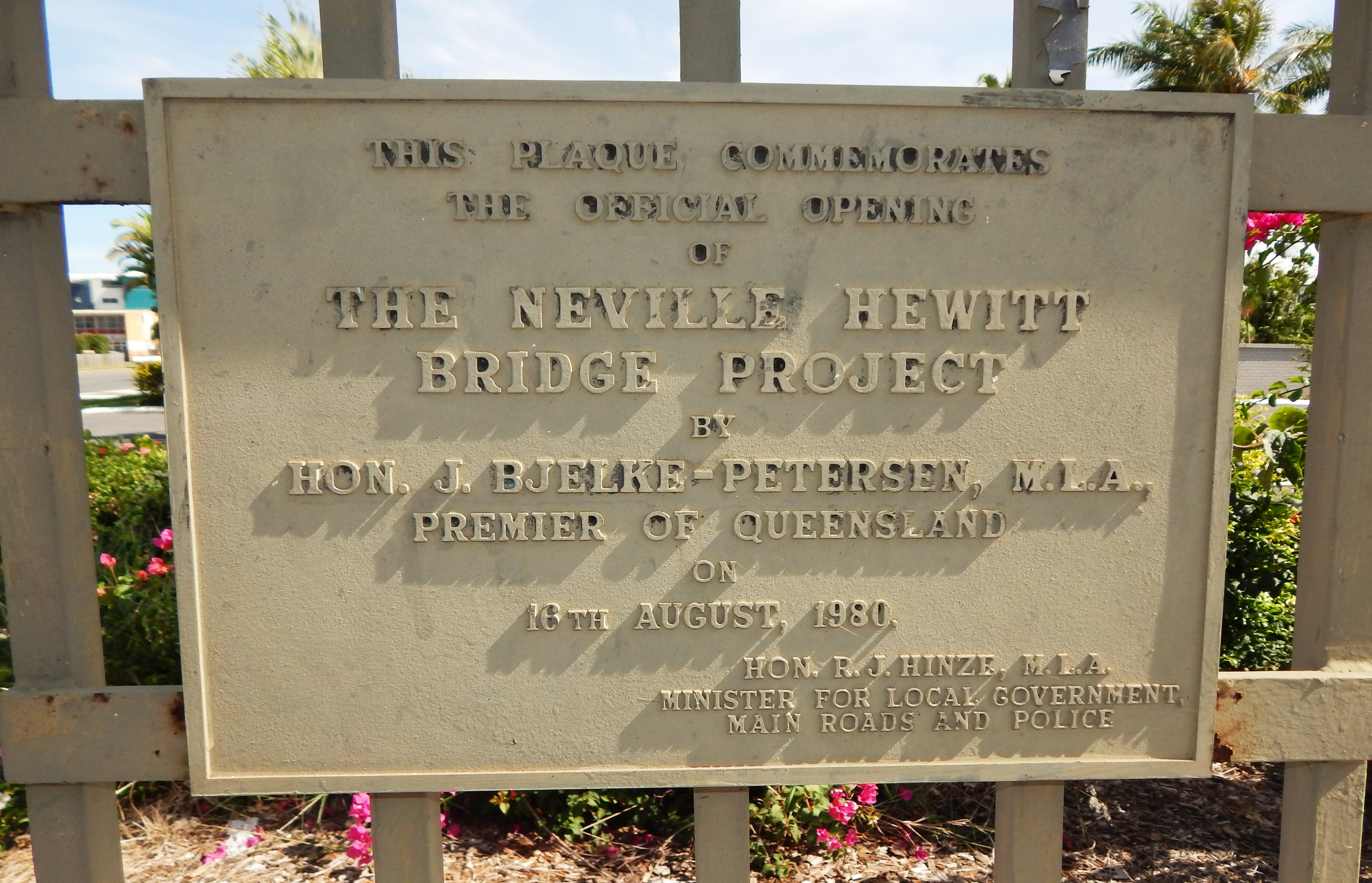
Plaque on the bridge commemorating its 1980 opening, 2022

The Neville Hewitt Bridge carries the Bruce Highway across the Fitzroy River, connecting Albert Street in Rockhampton City with Moore's Creek Road in Park Avenue. As of July 2016, up to 36,000 vehicles used the bridge each day. In 2018, the Queensland Government announced plans to divert the Bruce Highway upon completion of the Rockhampton Ring Road, when a new bridge will open upstream to allow vehicles to bypass the city. The Ring Road project was expected to be completed in 2031.

To ease traffic congestion in Rockhampton, the local community has called for an additional bridge to be constructed across the Fitzroy River. Significant disruption to the city's traffic network occurs when the Neville Hewitt Bridge is blocked by various accidents.

Though the bridge was built in 1980, local media still describe the Neville Hewitt Bridge as a "new bridge".

== See also ==
- Fitzroy Bridge
- Fitzroy Bridge (1952)
- Alexandra Railway Bridge
