= Rookwood Weir =

Weir in Central Queensland, Australia

- Location of the weir in Queensland
- Interactive map of Rookwood Weir
- Official name: Managibei Gamu (in Darumbal language)
- Country: Australia
- Location: Gogango, Central Queensland
- Coordinates: 23°32′28″S 150°00′55″E
- Purpose: Irrigation; Potable water supply; Industry
- Status: Operational
- Construction began: 2020
- Opening date: 22 November 2023
- Construction cost: A$568.9 million
- Built by: Acciona
- Designed by: GHD Group
- Operator: SunWater

Dam and spillways
- Type of dam: Barrage
- Impounds: Fitzroy River
- Height (foundation): 16.2 m (53 ft)
- Length: 350 m (1,150 ft)
- Spillway type: Uncontrolled
- Spillway length: 202 m (663 ft)

Reservoir
- Total capacity: 86,000 ML (70,000 acre⋅ft)
- Active capacity: 74,325 ML (60,256 acre⋅ft)
- Surface area: 1,930 ha (4,800 acres)
- Maximum length: 60 km (37 mi) (shoreline)
- Normal elevation: 46.2 m (152 ft) AHD
- Website sunwater.com.au

The Rookwood Weir (Darumbal: Managibei Gamu, meaning keeping – saving [water]) is a concrete weir across the Fitzroy River, located near Gogango, approximately 66 kilometres (41 mi) south-west of Rockhampton, in Central Queensland, Australia. The weir was constructed to assist with the supply of water for agriculture, potable water for the Livingstone Shire Council, and industrial needs.

== Overview ==
Built between 2020 and 2023, and officially opened on 22 November 2023 by the Queensland Treasurer Cameron Dick and the Federal Minister for the Environment and Water Tanya Plibersek, it was reported that the weir was the largest built in Australia since World War II. Funding for the weir was provided jointly by the Australian and Queensland governments at a cost of A$568.9 million.

The weir is situated downriver from the confluence of the Dawson and Mackenzie rivers, in the upper reaches of the Fitzroy, and upriver from the Eden Bann Weir and the Fitzroy River Barrage.

Managed by SunWater, the weir is 16.2 metres (53 ft) high and 350 metres (1,150 ft) long. The resultant reservoir has a full supply volume (FSV) of 74,325 megalitres (60,256 acre⋅ft), with a yield at FSL of 86,000 megalitres (70,000 acre⋅ft) that covers 1,930 hectares (4,800 acres), and with a shoreline that is 60 kilometres (37 mi) in circumference. The spillway is 202 metres (663 ft) long.

During 2023, agriculture investment was announced with a macadamia farm and a cattle feedlot development underway, supported by water supplied from the weir. The weir includes a specially-designed passage to allow local turtles, including the Fitzroy River Turtle and the White-throated Snapping Turtle, to travel up and downstream to breed, seek shelter, and find food; as well as an innovative fish lock.

== See also ==
- List of dams and reservoirs in Australia
