= Fitzroy Bridge =

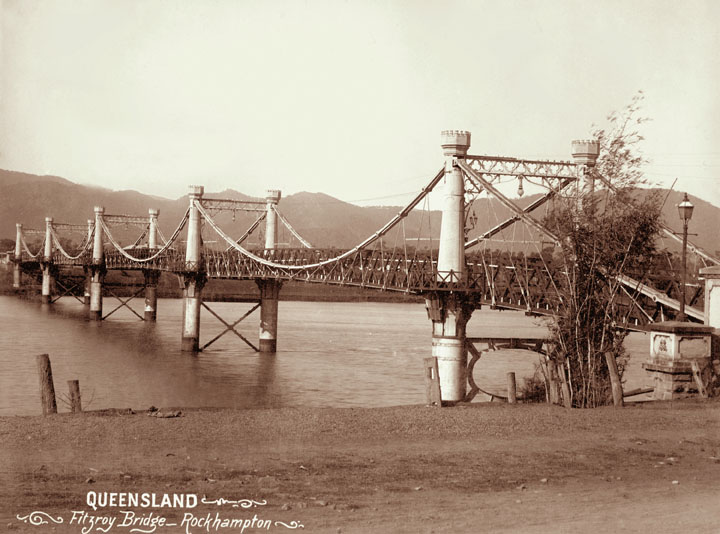
- Coordinates: 23°22′30″S 150°30′53″E
- Carried: Bruce Highway (1881–1952); horses; pedestrians; motor vehicles
- Crossed: Fitzroy River
- Locale: Rockhampton, Central Queensland, Australia
- Began: Rockhampton City
- Ended: Berserker
- Preceded by: Fitzroy Bridge (1952)

Characteristics
- Design: Suspension bridge
- Total length: 336.5 metres (1,104 ft)
- Width: 6.1 metres (20 ft)
- Longest span: 70.7 metres (232 ft)
- No. of spans: 6
- Piers in water: 5

History
- Designer: Frederick John Byerley
- Construction start: March 1877
- Construction cost: £54,000
- Opened: 1 January 1881
- Demolished: 25 January 1956
- Replaced: Steam ferryboat
- Replaced by: Fitzroy Bridge (1952)

Location
- Interactive map of Fitzroy Bridge

The Fitzroy Bridge was a suspension bridge that spanned the Fitzroy River in Rockhampton, Queensland, Australia from 1881 until it was demolished in 1956.

== Overview ==
Construction work on the bridge commenced in March 1877.

The bridge consisted of both timber and iron with a Gothic appearance. Most noticeably, the tops of its piers were designed as turrets, giving the structure an ornamental appearance.

The bridge was 336 metres (1,104 ft) long, with the roadway situated 6.1 metres (20 ft) above the high water mark. Construction of the bridge cost £54,000. Officially opened on 1 January 1881, the Fitzroy Bridge was Rockhampton's first bridge and until the Alexandra Railway Bridge was opened in 1899, it was the only bridge crossing the river. Prior to it being built, residents were ferried across the river on a steam ferryboat.

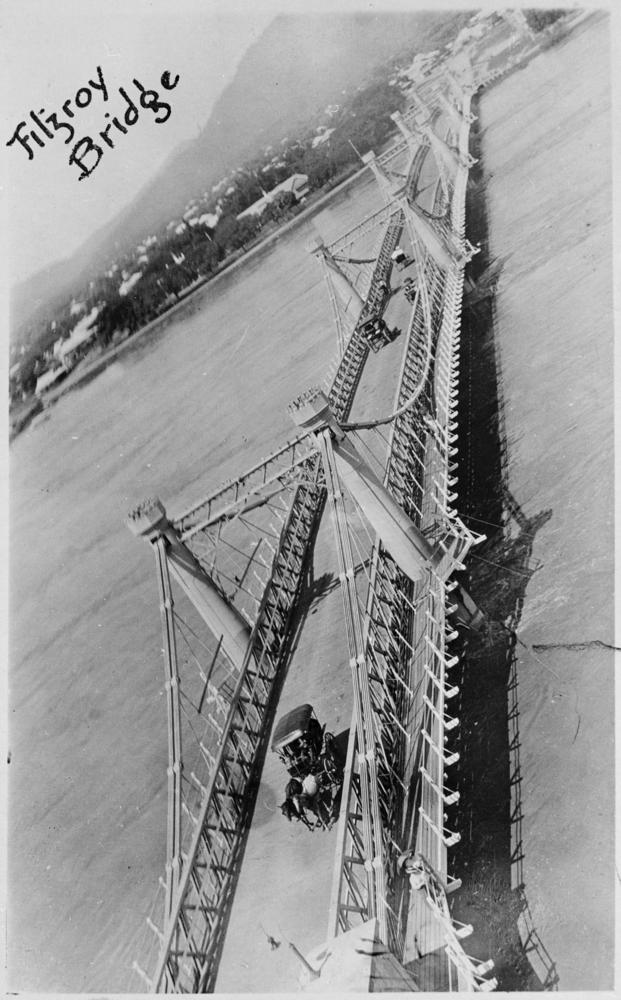
Horsedrawn carriages on the bridge, c. 1910

The official ceremony consisted of a procession walking across the bridge, the planting of memorial trees at the northern end and the bridge's designer, Frederick Byerley breaking a bottle of champagne on one of the pedestals at the southern end of the bridge where he "baptised" the structure, the Fitzroy Bridge. Following the official opening, a large crowd gathered at the Criterion Hotel who proceeding to drink a number of toasts in honour of Rockhampton's new bridge. Byerley was presented with a walnut writing desk along with a gold pen and pencil as a token of the respect the bridge workers had for him during construction of the bridge.

The bridge remained in service until a new bridge, also called the Fitzroy Bridge, was officially opened alongside the old bridge on 27 September 1952.

After standing for 75 years, the original Fitzroy Bridge was demolished on 25 January 1956. A commemorative plaque was erected on the riverbank near to where the bridge was once accessed from the south opposite the Criterion Hotel on 27 August 1988. The plaque commemorates both the first Fitzroy Bridge and the pioneering work of its designer Frederick John Byerley.

== See also ==
- Fitzroy Bridge (opened 1952)
- Alexandra Railway Bridge
- Neville Hewitt Bridge
