= Rockhampton Ring Road =

Proposed road in Queensland, Australia

Rockhampton Ring Road Queensland

General information
- Type: Highway (Proposed)
- Length: 14.7 km (9.1 mi)

Major junctions
- South-west end: Capricorn Highway Fairy Bower
- New road to Rockhampton-Ridgelands Road; Alexandra Street
- North-east end: Bruce Highway Parkhurst

Location(s)
- Major settlements: Pink Lily

Highway system
- Highways in Australia; National Highway • Freeways in Australia; Highways in Queensland

Rockhampton Ring Road is a 14.7 kilometres (9.1 mi) proposed highway from Fairy Bower on the Capricorn Highway south-west of Rockhampton to Parkhurst on the Bruce Highway to the north-east of Rockhampton, in Queensland, Australia. The road will be two lanes from the Capricorn Highway to a connection in Pink Lily (known as the West Rockhampton Connection) and four lanes from there to the Bruce Highway, including a new bridge over the Fitzroy River. It will enable through traffic to bypass the Rockhampton CBD, avoiding 19 sets of traffic signals, and will eliminate delays caused by flooding on sections of the Bruce Highway within the city.

== Funding and program status ==
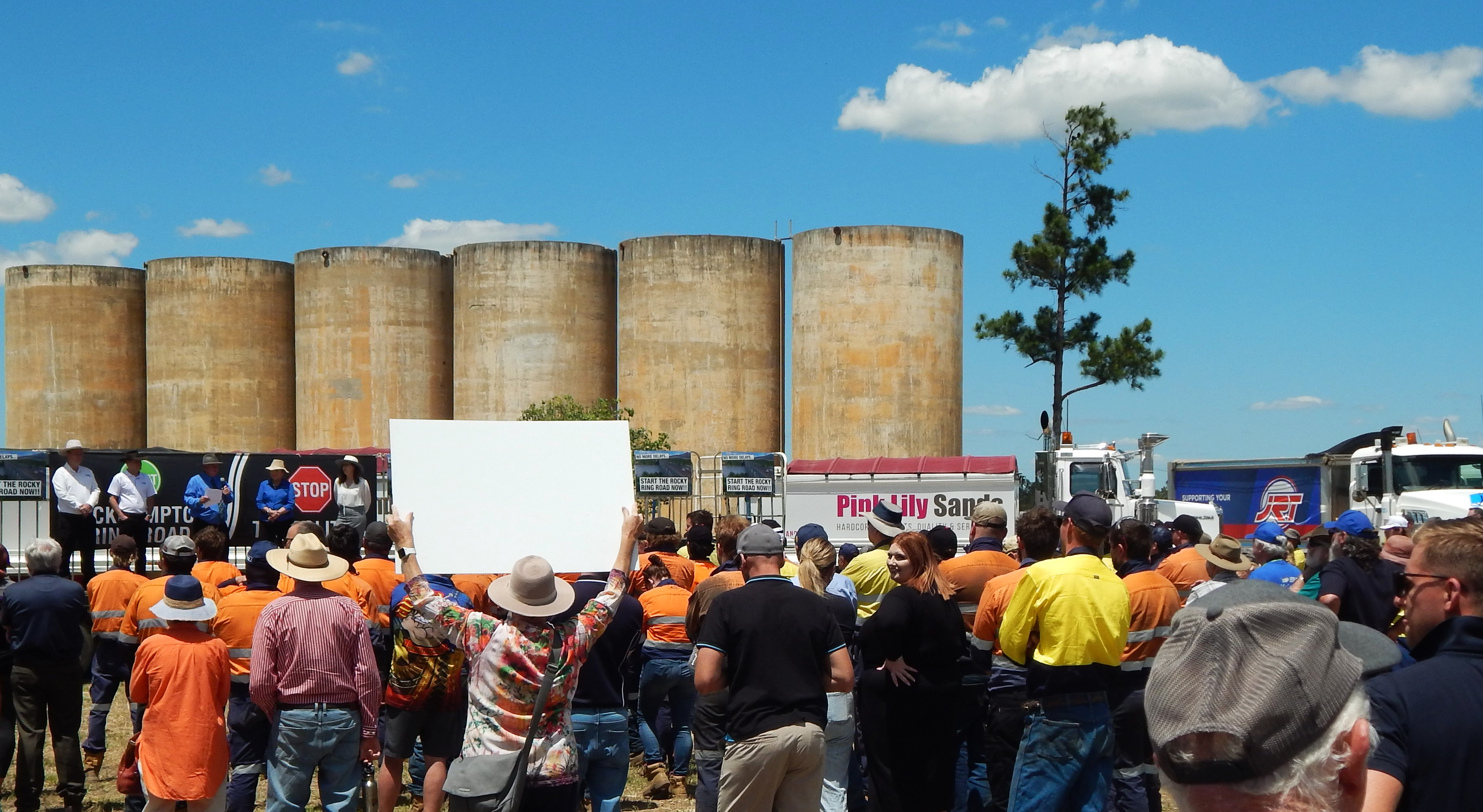
Start Rockhampton Ring Road protest rally, 2022

As of July 2022, funding of $1.065 billion had been allocated, planning had been completed, and the business case was being assessed by Infrastructure Australia. Detailed design had commenced, with an expectation that construction would be completed by 2026.

Works on the project were expected to commence in January 2023, but costs blowouts during the tendering process prompted the federal government to delay the project indefinitely. This prompted criticism from the local businesses who had already hired new workers and purchased new equipment in preparation of the project's commencement.

A community campaign was organised with a rally held in Parkhurst on 4 November 2022 which was attended by various community leaders, politicians and business owners, which was followed by a "convoy to Canberra" where representatives agitated for the project to commence. Silos at Parkhurst were also painted with the slogan "Start Rocky Ring Road 2023."

The federal and state governments ultimately reached an agreement in December 2022 which guaranteed construction of the ring road would commence in 2023.

Early works on the Rockhampton Ring Road commenced in November 2023.

As of September 2025, completed works on the project had included:

- Construction of the northern entry alignment at Parkhurst with new access to the Dreamtime Cultural Centre and the emergency services precinct.
- A new roundabout on Rockhampton-Ridgelands Road in West Rockhampton which opened in April 2025.
- A new 61.1-metre bridge over Lion Creek in West Rockhampton which was officially completed in June 2025.
- A new 204-metre bridge over Limestone Creek at Parkhurst, the completion of which signified the transition of the project's early stages to the main construction stage.

Construction of the ring road is now expected to be completed in 2031.

== Preparatory works ==
The projects described below will facilitate the construction of intersections at either end of the ring road.

=== Capricorn Highway duplication ===
A project to duplicate the section of Capricorn Highway between Rockhampton and Gracemere was completed in mid 2021 at a total cost of $75 million.

=== Rockhampton northern access upgrade ===
A project to upgrade the northern access to Rockhampton in the vicinity of the intersection of the Bruce Highway with Rockhampton–Yeppoon Road, at a cost of $194 million, was completed in August 2021.

== Route description ==
The road will start at an intersection with the Capricorn Highway in Fairy Bower. This will be at a three-way roundabout with a high level slip lane for traffic approaching from Gracemere. The road will run north-west, north, and north-east, crossing over several local roads and lagoons, before reaching a three-way roundabout in Pink Lily, known as the West Rockhampton Connection. From there a new exit and entry road will lead south to Rockhampton–Ridgelands Road (Note: Rockhampton–Ridgelands Road is a state-controlled district road (number 511) rated as a local road of regional significance (LRRS)), giving access to Rockhampton Airport, Rockhampton Hospital, and the CBD. This exit and entry road is part of an additional 2.7 kilometres (1.7 mi) of new roadway included in the project. The ring road will include more than 6 kilometres (3.7 mi) of bridging.

Continuing as a four-lane highway, the road will run north-east, north, and north-east again before crossing the Fitzroy River into Parkhurst and reaching an intersection with Alexandra Street, which will provide access to the North Rockhampton CBD. From there the road will continue generally north-east, crossing over the railway line and meeting the Bruce Highway and Rockhampton–Yeppoon Road at a four-way signalised intersection.

== Major intersections ==
Total distance is 14.7 kilometres (9.1 mi). Intermediate distances are not yet available. The entire road is in the Rockhampton local government area.

Location	km	mi	Destinations	Notes
Fairy Bower	0	0.0	Capricorn Highway – south-west – Gracemere – east – Rockhampton	Three-way roundabout with slip road from south-west. South-western end of Rockhampton Ring Road. Continues north-west as a two-lane road.
Pink Lily			New road south to Rockhampton-Ridgelands Road, then: – south-east – Rockhampton CBD – north-west – Ridgelands	Three-way roundabout. Continues north-east as a four-lane road.
Fitzroy River			New four-lane bridge	
Parkhurst			Alexandra Street – south-east – North Rockhampton CBD – north-west – Parkhurst	Grade separated intersection. Entry/exit type not yet defined. Road continues north-east.
Parkhurst	14.7	9.1	Bruce Highway – north – Mackay – south – Rockhampton; Rockhampton–Yeppoon Road – north-east – Yeppoon	Signalised four-way intersection. North-eastern end of Rockhampton Ring Road.
1.000 mi = 1.609 km; 1.000 km = 0.621 mi
