= Alexandra Railway Bridge =

Historic railway bridge in Rockhampton, Queensland, Australia

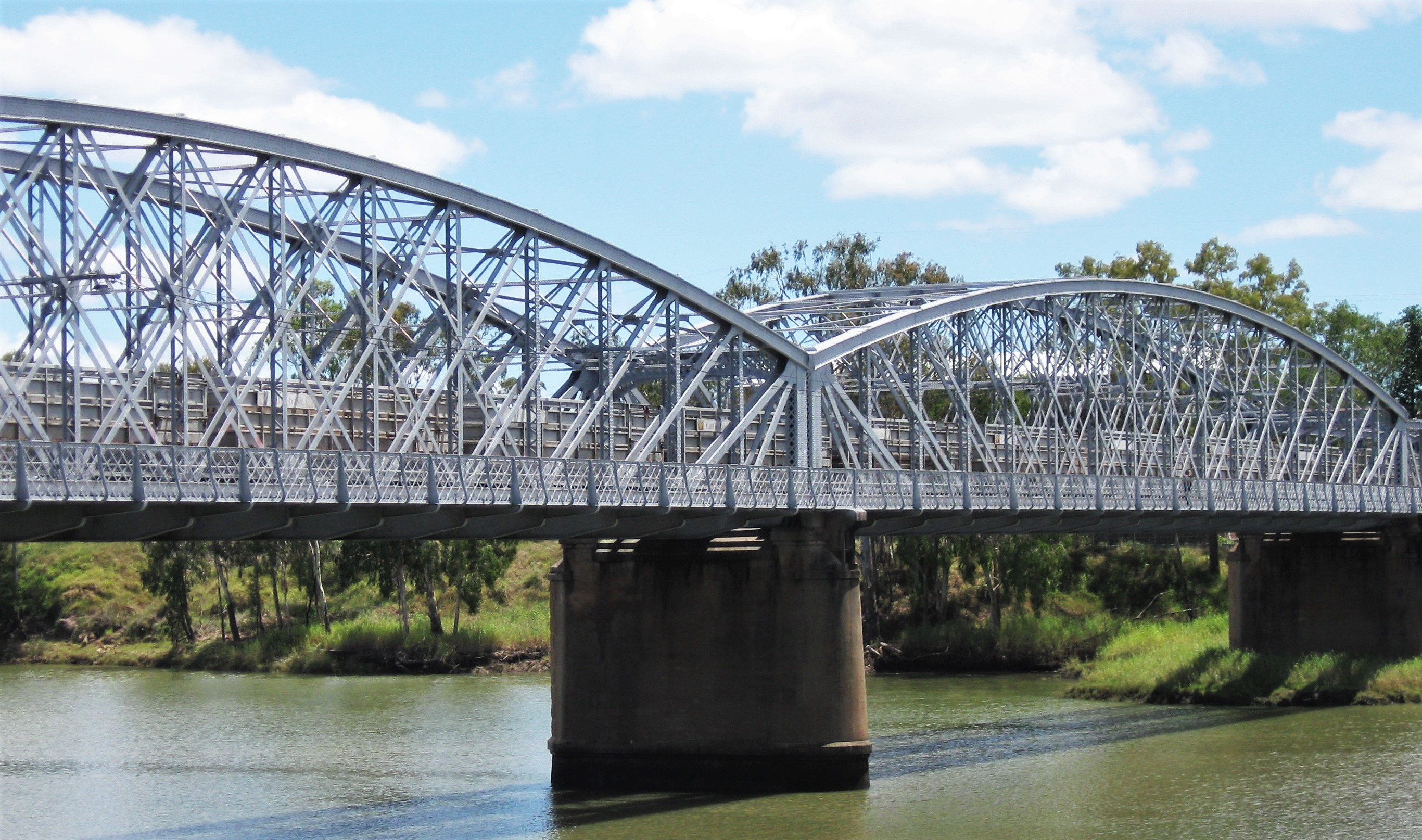
- Alexandra Railway Bridge, in 2012
- Coordinates: 23°22′07″S 150°30′30″E
- Carries: North Coast railway line; pedestrians
- Crosses: Fitzroy River
- Locale: Rockhampton, Central Queensland, Australia
- Begins: Rockhampton City
- Ends: North Rockhampton
- Named for: Alexandra, Princess of Wales
- Preceded by: Rockhampton Ring Road (c. 2031)
- Followed by: Neville Hewitt Bridge

Characteristics
- Design: Pratt-span truss bridge
- Trough construction: Steel; with timber sleepers
- Pier construction: Concrete
- Total length: 211 metres (692 ft)
- No. of spans: 5
- Piers in water: 2

Rail characteristics
- No. of tracks: 1 (since 1975); 2 (1899–1975)
- Track gauge: Narrow gauge

History
- Designer: Henry Charles Stanley (Chief Engineer for Queensland Railways)
- Constructed by: George Charles Willcocks
- Built: 1898–1899
- Opened: 6 November 1899
- Rebuilt: 2021 (upgrade)
- Location within Queensland Location within Australia

Queensland Heritage Register
- Official name: Alexandra Railway Bridge
- Type: state heritage (built)
- Designated: 21 October 1992
- Reference no.: 600799
- Significant period: 1890s (fabric)
- Significant components: Pier/s (bridge), abutments – railway bridge, plaque
- Builders: George Charles Willcocks

Location
- Interactive map of Alexandra Railway Bridge

The Alexandra Railway Bridge is a heritage-listed railway bridge across the Fitzroy River that carries the North Coast railway line, located adjacent to North Street, Rockhampton, in Central Queensland, Australia. It was designed by Henry Charles Stanley and built from 1898 to 1899 by George Charles Willcocks. It was added to the Queensland Heritage Register on 21 October 1992.

== History ==
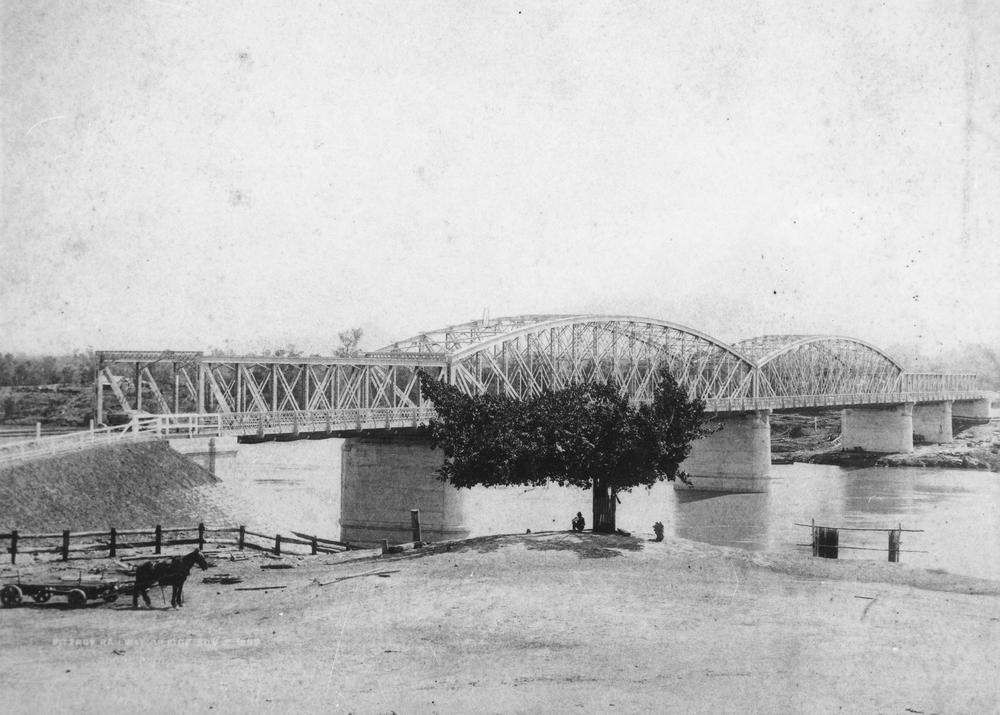
The bridge in 1899

The Alexandra Railway Bridge, constructed in 1898–1899, crosses the Fitzroy River and is an integral part of the original design of the Rockhampton Junction railway line, and is an important element in the development of the railway network in Queensland.

The Archer brothers had made a private expedition to the Rockhampton district in 1853, and were the first Europeans to record and chart the Fitzroy River. The Archers were also the first European pastoralists to arrive in the area. Their establishment of Gracemere pastoral station lead to further pastoral expansion into the area. After the short lived Canoona gold rush of 1858, Rockhampton was proclaimed as a town and declared a "port of entry" in 1858. Following the gold rush the town of Rockhampton developed as an entry and export town for Central Queensland. Rockhampton continued to eclipse its nearest rival Gladstone for nearly a century as the principal port for central Queensland.

In 1863 the Parliament of Queensland passed the controversial Railway Bill, which committed Queensland to the use of a narrow gauge for the development of its main line in Queensland. Other colonies in Australia at this time had adopted broader gauges for use on their rail networks. The reasoning behind this decision was that a narrow gauge would have lower construction costs.

The first section of the Queensland railway network was opened between Ipswich and Bigges Camp (now Grandchester) on 31 July 1865, and later extended to link the towns of Warwick, Dalby and Toowoomba with Ipswich. At the time that the Railway Act had been passed, the 5000 citizens of Rockhampton objected to having no provision made for the construction of a railway to their hinterland, where copper was being exploited in the Peak Downs area. A railway was thought necessary to ensure development of the interior.

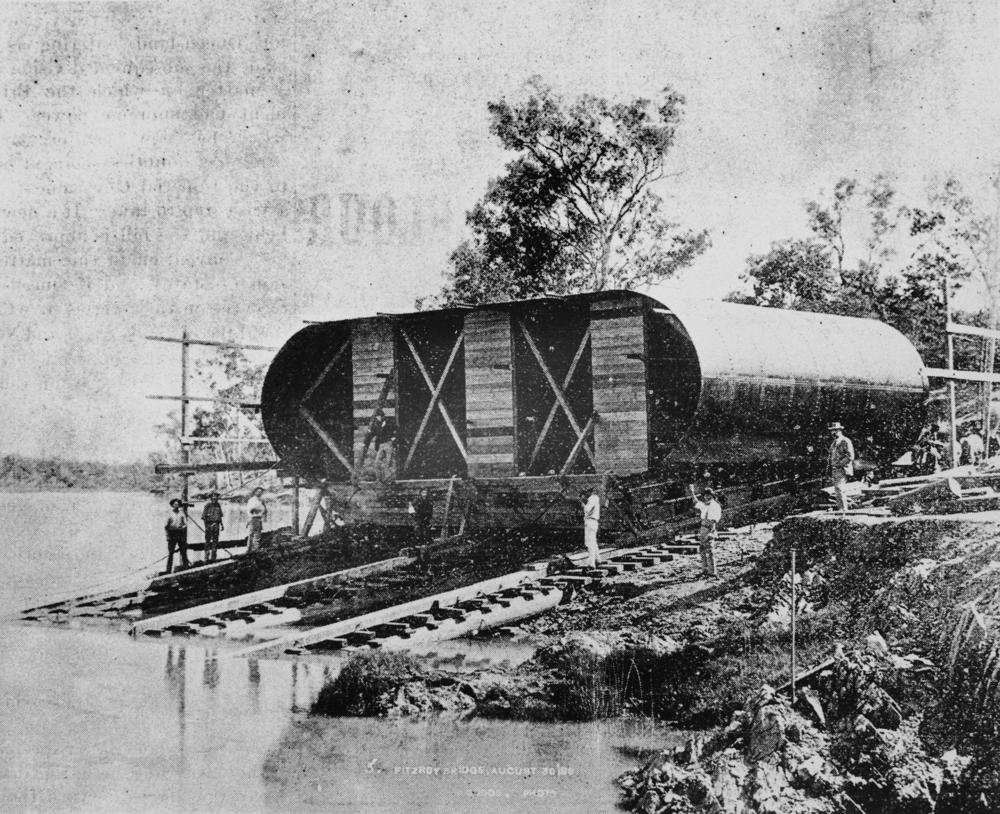
Construction of the bridge, 1898

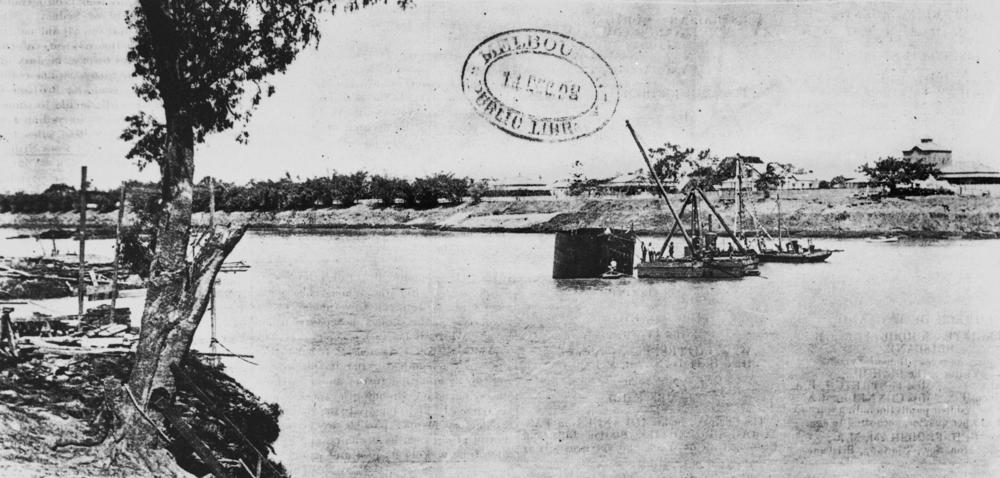
Construction of the bridge, 1898

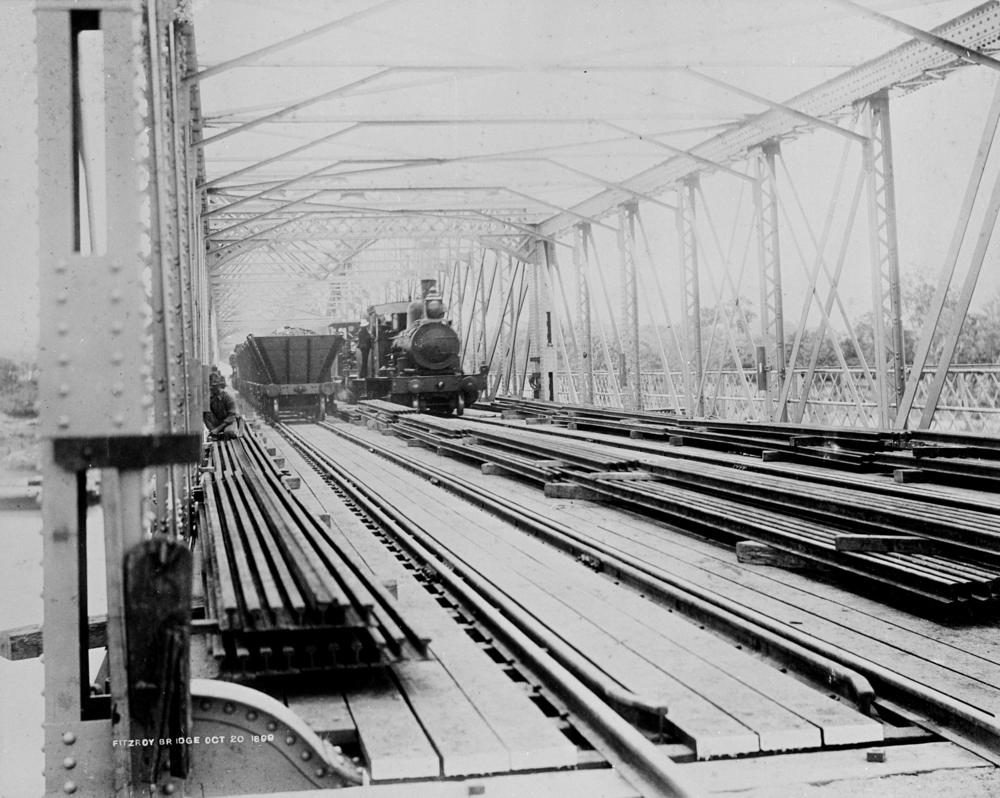
Steam engine crossing the bridge, 1899

The first length of line was opened to Westwood some 48 kilometres (30 mi) from Rockhampton in 1867. The line was extended beyond the coastal ranges in 1872, reaching Emerald in 1879. The Central Western railway line was progressively extended further west reaching Longreach in 1892, and remained an isolated railway system, with no connection to the southern division of Queensland railways until 1903.

In 1882 after Brisbane had acquired a railway to the seaside at Sandgate, Rockhampton clamoured for a similar connection to its resort at Emu Park. Construction of the Emu Park line was approved in 1885 and the line opened in 1888. The 1880s was a period of economic and civic expansion in Rockhampton as a result of the discovery and exploitation of the gold and ore body at Mount Morgan in the Dee Range forty kilometres from Rockhampton. A result of the isolation of Rockhampton from Brisbane, and the prosperity of the Mount Morgan mine, was the growth of the separatist movement which demanded separation of Northern Queensland from Brisbane. The colonial government of the period used railway construction, and the extension of the system, to counter the separation movement.

The line, similar to Bundaberg, featured a railway system divided by a major river. In Rockhampton, this consisted of the Central Western line running from a terminus in Stanley Street to Gracemere and westwards, which had no physical connection to the line from North Rockhampton to Emu Park. Two years after the opening of the Emu Park line, the Railway Department began investigating the possibility of linking Rockhampton's two separate railways. The bridging of the Fitzroy River and the cost of land resumptions to join the two terminus stations were to be major difficulties in connecting the two lines.

Trial surveys in 1890 investigated two routes, but the Australian banking crisis of 1893 forestalled further work. The impetus for bridging the Fitzroy River came from the decision of the Queensland Government to construct a deepwater port at Broadmount at the mouth of the Fitzroy River in 1894, and to link the Central Western Railway with North Rockhampton via a bridge across the Fitzroy and a line running via Denison Street. The original plan called for a single line down Denison Street and for a single track bridge, however the Rockhampton City Council protested against this decision. Following a visit to Rockhampton by chief engineer Henry Charles Stanley, the management of the Lakes Creek Meatworks at North Rockhampton convinced the Railway Department to construct a double line to North Rockhampton, as it was felt that developments in livestock and goods traffic would justify the initial outlay. In 1895 construction was approved for what was to be known as the Rockhampton Junction Railway. The new bridge and connecting line were the first examples of double lines outside of the Brisbane-Ipswich metropolitan area. The Rockhampton City Council gave half of Leichhardt Park (Archer Park) and Denison Street which allowed for the construction of a central railway station. The Council approved this work in October 1896.

The tender for construction of the Rockhampton Junction Railway was awarded to George Charles Willcocks in 1897. The contract involved the construction of the branch to Broadmount, the Denison Street line, and the Alexandra Railway Bridge. Willcocks at this period was one of Queensland's most prolific railway contractors, having been involved in the construction of various sections of the North Coast Line, as well as railway lines in the Brisbane area. The bridge contract was awarded to Willcocks at a cost of £43,471, and construction of the double line from Stanley Street to North Rockhampton was £65,137. Construction of the bridge was delayed until 1898 due to flooding on the Fitzroy River.

The bridge was designed by chief engineer Henry Charles Stanley and is similar to, but smaller than, the Albert Bridge, which he designed to replace the Brisbane River crossing which was washed away during the 1893 flood. Five metal truss spans were used, two at 75 metres (246 ft) in length and two at 30.5 metres (100 ft). No falsework was used during construction because of the risk of floods. The first of the main spans was floated into position on 14 June 1899. The method used to place the main spans was also similar to that used for the Albert Bridge, where a hulk was employed to float the span into position.

At the time of its construction, the maximum span of the bridge at 75 metres (246 ft) was the fourth largest achieved in Australia, after the first Hawkesbury Bridge in New South Wales (1889, 125 metres (410 ft)), Albert Bridge (1895, 103.7 metres (340 ft)) and the Burdekin River's Macrossan Bridge, Qld (76.2 metres (250 ft)).

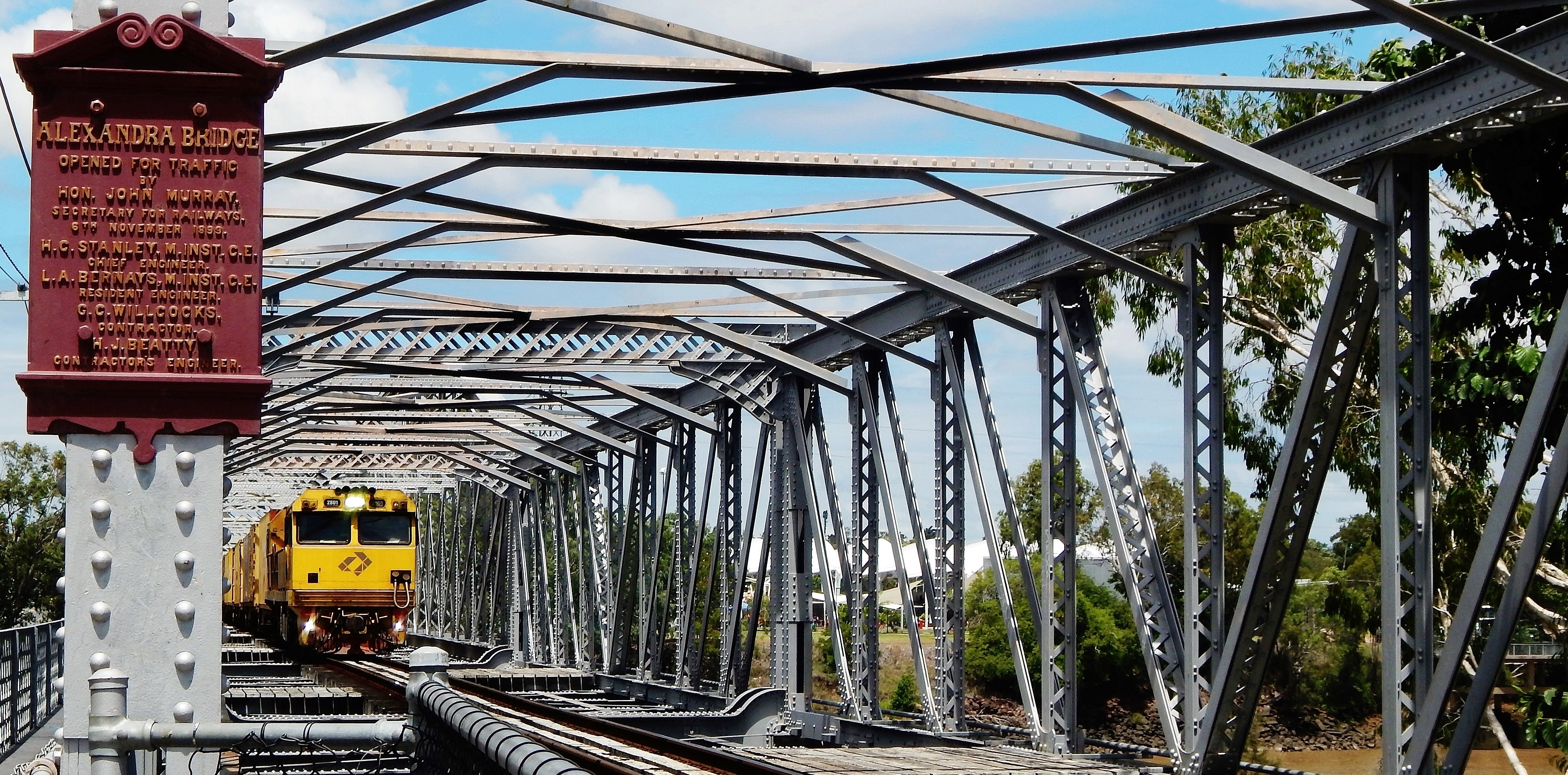
North-bound freight train crossing the bridge, 2017

The Rockhampton Junction Railway was officially opened on 6 November 1899 with a special ceremony held on the southern end of the railway extension. A double headed train and twelve carriages left the Stanley Street Station and broke through a ribbon on the Fitzroy railway bridge. At the time of its opening, no official name for the bridge had been decided, but it had been suggested that it be named after Alexandra, Princess of Wales. The Minister for Railways, John Murray, officially named the bridge "Alexandra" at the opening ceremony, after consulting with the Queensland Premier, James Dickson, earlier in the day. With the completion of the Alexandra Railway Bridge, the Emu Park and Central Western railways provided a unified rail link between the two halves of Rockhampton.

The Alexandra Railway Bridge has been restricted to weight limits since 1922 when C16 class locomotives and heavier engines were not permitted to pass on the bridge when it was occupied by another train. The introduction of larger locomotives to Queensland Railways and increasing axle loadings has led to additional restrictions on the speed of trains when passing over the bridge.

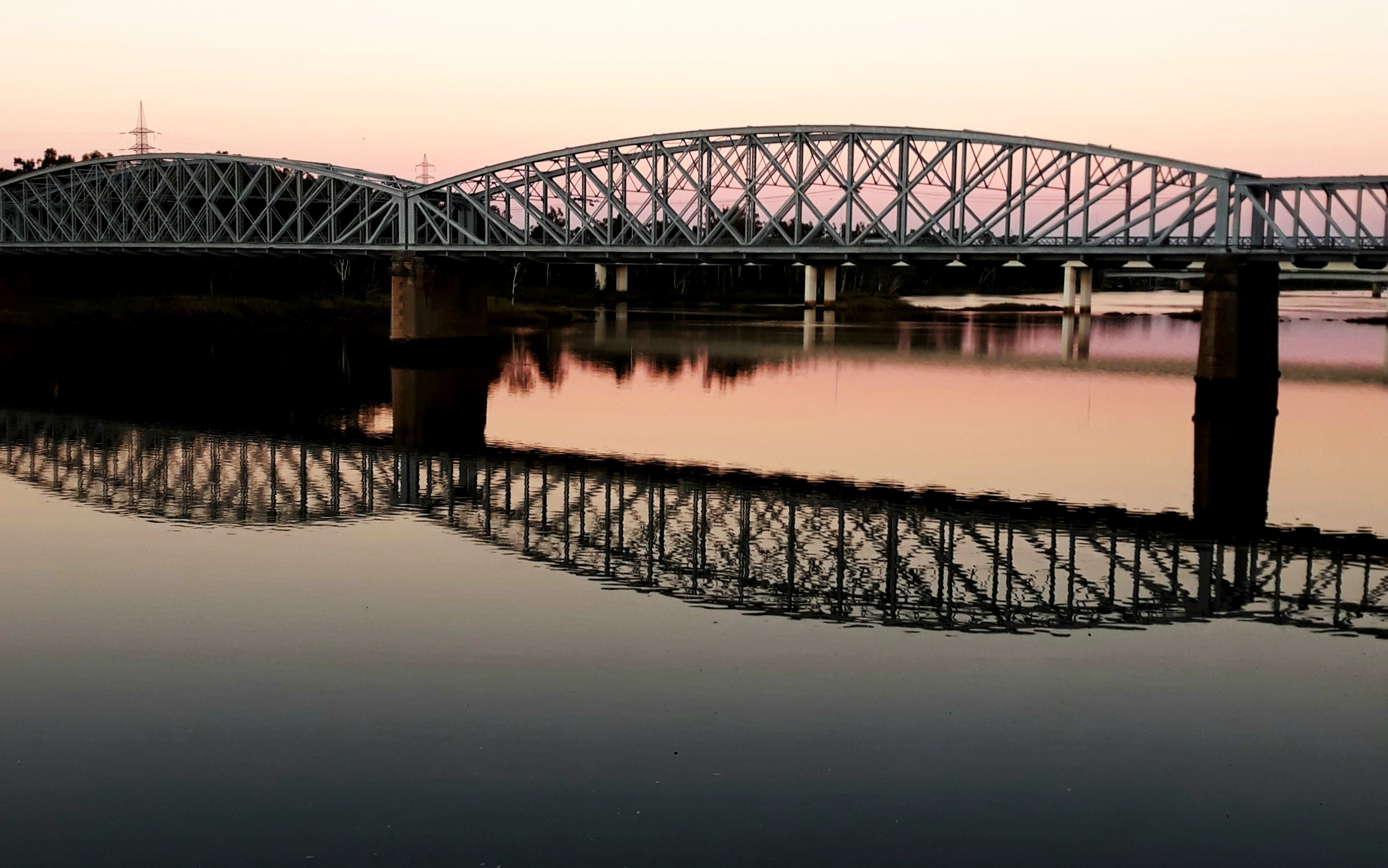
Looking downstream towards the bridge, 2018. The Neville Hewitt Bridge can be seen in the background.

In 1930 the Rockhampton City Council erected electric lighting along the footway over the length of the bridge. In 1942, during World War II, the Mayor of Rockhampton suggested that a roadway should be constructed on the Alexandra bridge as City Council buses were unable to use the road suspension bridge over the Fitzroy River as a result of their five tonne weight. With the road bridge also unsafe for use by military convoys, it was suggested that decking should be constructed on the bridge to provide for a 3.5-metre-wide (11 ft) roadway. As a result, American military convoys used the bridge to cross the Fitzroy River. Flagmen and guards were placed at each end of the bridge, and convoys were worked around train services where up to forty trains used the bridge per day. The decking was removed in 1945.

In 1948 the bridge was used to carry electric cables to supply power to Rockhampton, as an alternative to towers. In 1951 steel handrails were installed along the length of the bridge. Repairs to the bridge were carried out in 1958 and 1960.

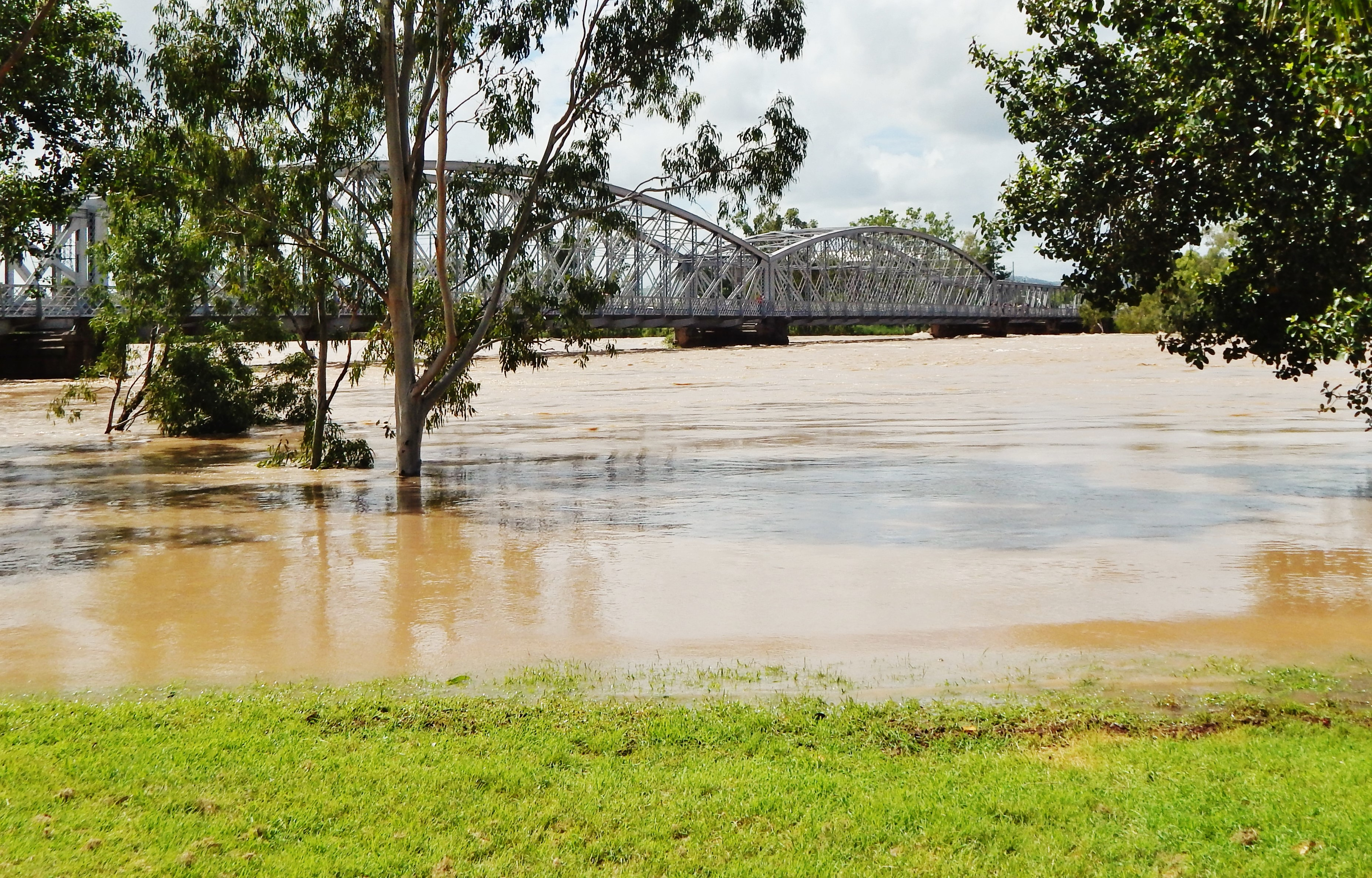
The flooded Fitzroy River at the bridge, 2017

With the introduction of diesel-electric motive power, concerns were voiced about the possible danger of having double headed trains using the bridge from 1970. A speed restriction of 20 kilometres per hour (12 mph) was placed on diesel-electric locomotives using the bridge similar to that used for larger steam locomotives. Restrictions were made to cover all trains using the bridge, ensuring that one train only was allowed occupancy of the bridge when passing. The restrictions were not removed until 1975 when the removal of the eastern set of rails was undertaken, thereby singling the double bridge.

Since 1977 community protest has been mounting for a new right of way to be found for trains in Rockhampton avoiding Denison Street and its street crossings, and the crossing of the Fitzroy River at the Alexandra Bridge. Most plans sought the relaying of the main line from Stanley Street station and crossing the Fitzroy River on a new bridge and alignment. Speed restrictions on the bridge are also cited as a cause of delay.

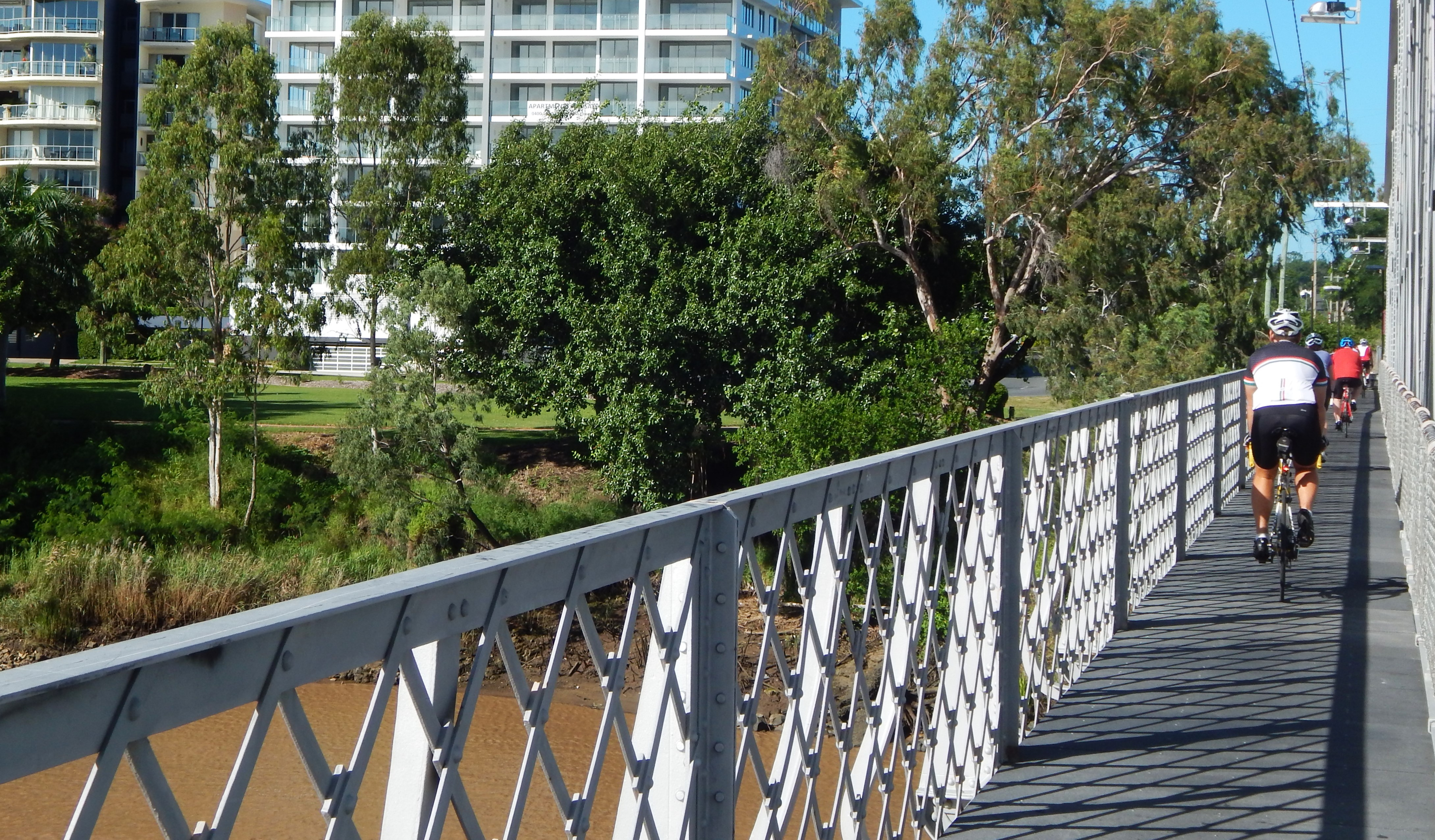
Cyclists using the shared walkway/cycleway on the bridge, 2015

Longitudinal beams on the underside of the bridge deck were relocated in 1992 to increase the possible axle loading available for new generation diesel-electric locomotives to 20 tonnes (20 long tons).

In November 1996 the timber pedestrian footway on the bridge was replaced by a non-slip surface mounted on plywood sheeting. Concerns were raised in 2010 by pedestrians and cyclists about the safety of the walkway when noticeable holes began appearing which were believed to be due to the plywood rotting away. The walkway was temporarily closed the following year to allow the walkway to be repaired.

In 2009, a 20-year-old motorist was charged after allegedly driving a Jeep along the railway tracks on the bridge before getting stuck approximately 70 metres from the southern end of the bridge. The incident halted rail services for five hours, and the line was reopened after a train was used to shunt the vehicle off the bridge.

The bridge was subject to a $2.2 million upgrade in 2021 which included the replacement of 500 timber sleepers. After some delays, the upgrade was completed by September 2021. Several weeks later, on 17 September 2021, an oversize railway wagon collided with the bridge's overhead structure. An Australian Transport Safety Bureau investigation attributed the cause of the incident due to a road-articulated trailer that was loaded onto a flatbed railway wagon as the Rockhampton-bound Aurizon train passed over the bridge.

== Description ==
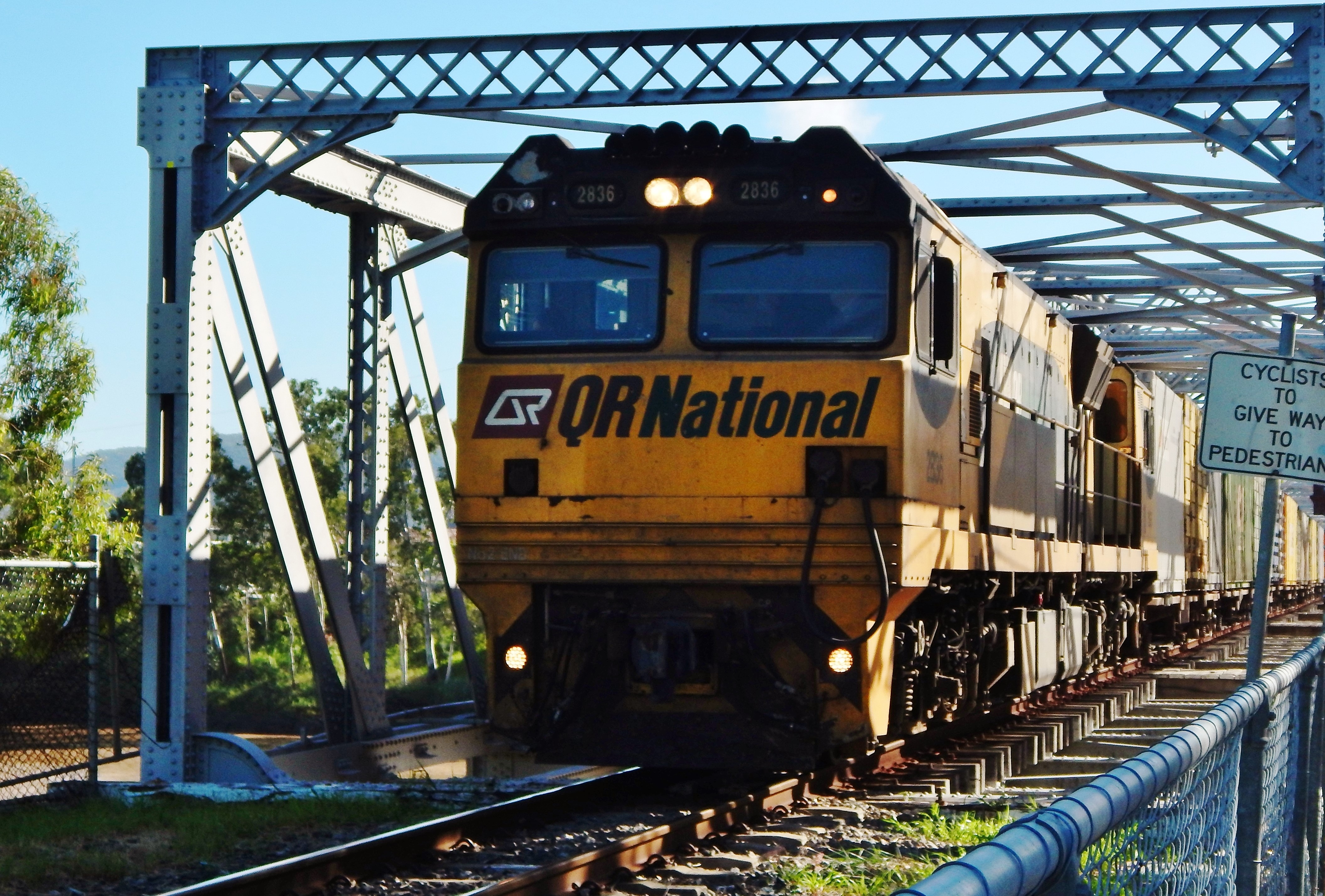
A south-bound freight train crossing the bridge, 2015

The Alexandra Railway Bridge crosses the Fitzroy River, with the southwestern approach adjacent to North Street, Rockhampton. The bridge originally contained a double line railway until 1975, when the eastern set of rails were removed, and the western set was realigned to a central position on the bridge platform.

The bridge consists of five truss spans supported on two concrete abutments and four common concrete piers. The concrete piers are the width of the bridge, and have buttress-like quoining at each end, with rendered detailing. The two northeastern piers are located on the northern embankment, with the remaining two piers located within the river. The two concrete embankments have rendered details similar to the piers.

The northeastern end has two 100-foot (30 m) riveted 8 panel through Pratt trusses with parallel chords and decking. A similar single truss is located at the southwestern end of the bridge. The centre of the bridge has two 250-foot (76 m) riveted 16 panel hogback double intersection Pratt trusses and decking on wrought iron caissons.

A pedestrian walkway, located along the southeastern side of the bridge, has a metal handrail and balustrade formed by intersecting diagonal members. A metal plaque commemorates the opening of the bridge, with the name of those involved in its construction.

== Heritage listing ==
Alexandra Railway Bridge was listed on the Queensland Heritage Register on 21 October 1992 having satisfied the following criteria.

The place is important in demonstrating the evolution or pattern of Queensland's history.

The Alexandra Railway Bridge has provided a major crossing of the Fitzroy River since 1899, and is important in demonstrating the evolution of the railway network in central Queensland and in the city of Rockhampton. The bridge is an integral part of the original design of the Rockhampton Junction Railway, which included the double line street railway connecting Stanley Street station and North Rockhampton via Denison Street. The bridge was also strategically important during the Second World War, providing a crossing of the Fitzroy River for American military convoys.

The place demonstrates rare, uncommon or endangered aspects of Queensland's cultural heritage.

The Alexandra Railway Bridge is of significance for its riveted through Pratt trusses which were the first of their type in Queensland. It is also significant for its riveted hogback double intersection Pratt truss main span, which is the second largest of its type in Queensland.

The place is important in demonstrating the principal characteristics of a particular class of cultural places.

The Alexandra Railway Bridge is of significance for its riveted through Pratt trusses which were the first of their type in Queensland. It is also significant for its riveted hogback double intersection Pratt truss main span, which is the second largest of its type in Queensland.

The place is important because of its aesthetic significance.

The Alexandra Railway Bridge is of aesthetic significance, and makes an important contribution to the Rockhampton townscape and the Fitzroy River riverscape.

The place is important in demonstrating a high degree of creative or technical achievement at a particular period.

The Alexandra Railway Bridge is of significance for its riveted through Pratt trusses which were the first of their type in Queensland. It is also significant for its riveted hogback double intersection Pratt truss main span, which is the second largest of its type in Queensland.

The place has a special association with the life or work of a particular person, group or organisation of importance in Queensland's history.

The bridge is important as an example of the design work of Chief Engineer HC Stanley, and his contribution to engineering practices on Queensland Railways in the latter part of the nineteenth century.
