= Fitzroy River Barrage (Queensland) =

Dam in Rockhampton, Queensland, Australia

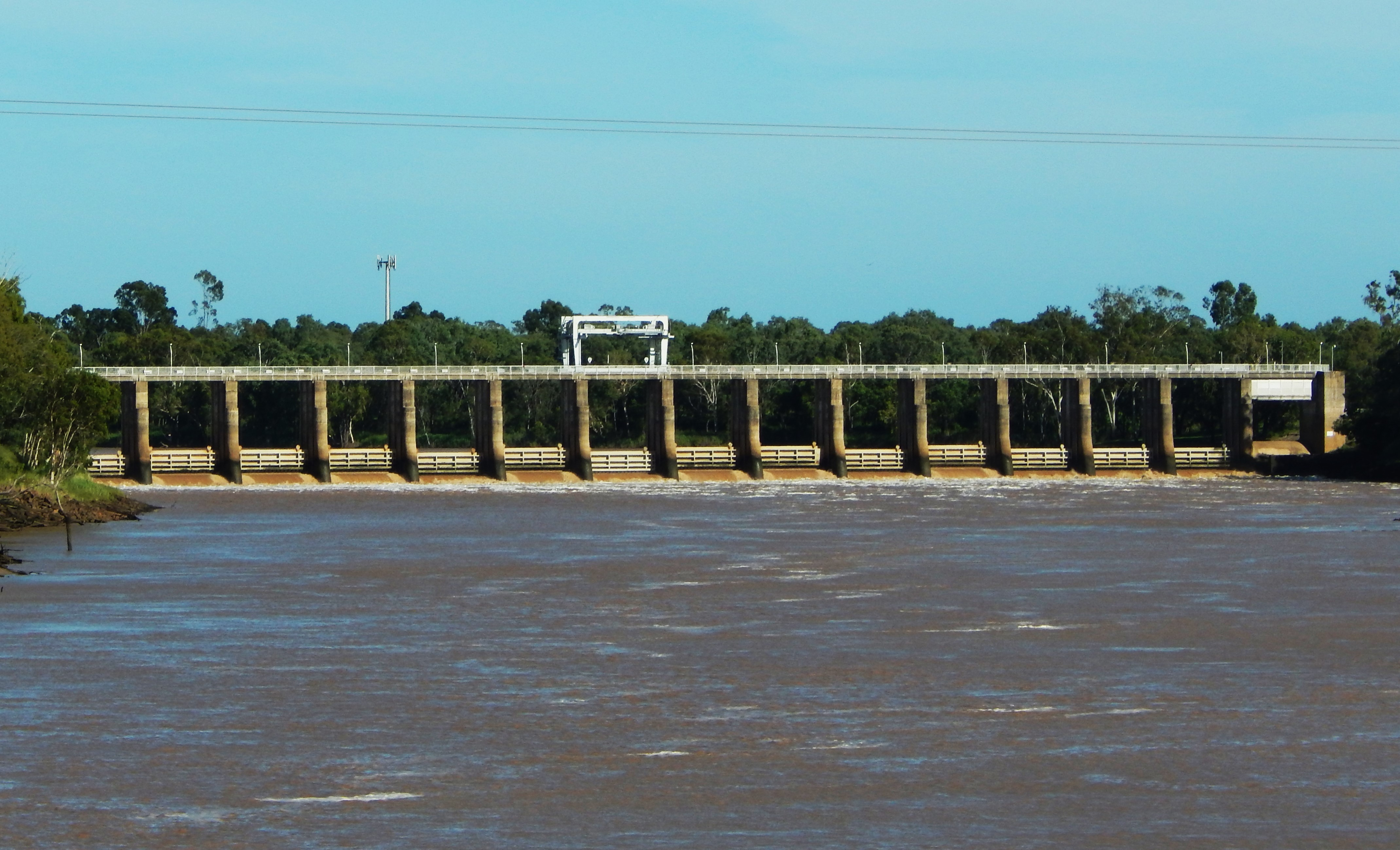
- The barrage in 2015

- Location of the barrage in Queensland
- Interactive map of Fitzroy River Barrage
- Country: Australia
- Location: Rockhampton, Central Queensland
- Coordinates: 23°21′39″S 150°29′53″E
- Purpose: Potable water supply; Irrigation
- Status: Operational
- Construction began: 7 November 1966
- Opening date: 19 March 1970
- Construction cost: A$3.5 million
- Built by: Dillingham Constructions
- Owner: City of Rockhampton
- Operator: Fitzroy River Water

Dam and spillways
- Type of dam: Barrage; Gravity dam
- Impounds: Fitzroy River
- Height (foundation): 10 m (33 ft)
- Length: 396 m (1,299 ft)
- Dam volume: 24×10^{3} m^{3} (850×10^{3} cu ft)
- Spillways: 18
- Spillway type: Controlled
- Spillway capacity: 23,800 m^{3}/s (840,000 cu ft/s)

Reservoir
- Total capacity: 80,800 ML (65,500 acre⋅ft)
- Surface area: 1,612 ha (3,980 acres)

The Fitzroy River Barrage is a mid-river concrete gravity tidal barrage across the Fitzroy River, located in Rockhampton, Central Queensland, Australia. The barrage separates the tidal river into saltwater and freshwater sections. The barrage was designed to dam the river, enabling a permanent water supply to be stored for the city and its surrounding communities as well as providing an agricultural water supply for registered rural users.

== History ==
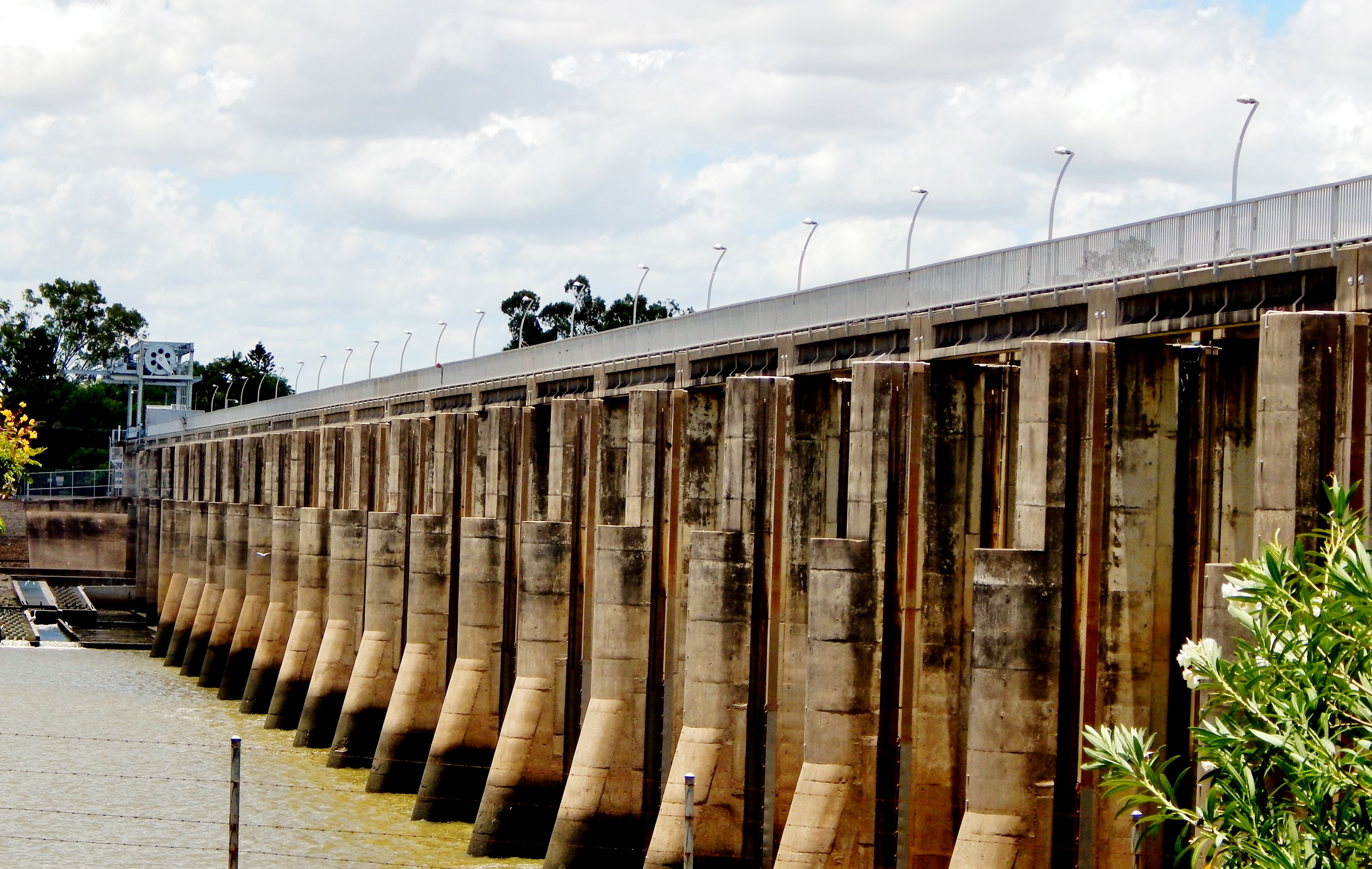
Fitzroy River Barrage, 2018

The Fitzroy River Barrage was the brainchild of Rockhampton mayor Rex Pilbeam who yearned to see the city have access to an abundant supply of water, following years of severe water restrictions. The concept of a barrage being constructed on the Fitzroy River was first canvassed in the 1920s.

Prior to the construction of the barrage, the water supply for Rockhampton was obtained from a pump station at Yaamba which pumped water to a water treatment plant at Mount Charlton, near The Caves with the treated water then using gravity to flow back down to Rockhampton. This provided Rockhampton with 30 megalitres (24 acre⋅ft) each day. However, the rapid population growth during the 1950s and early 1960s, meant the amount of treated water supplied from Yaamba was becoming insufficient, prompting the concept of the Fitzroy River Barrage to be revisited.

=== Construction ===
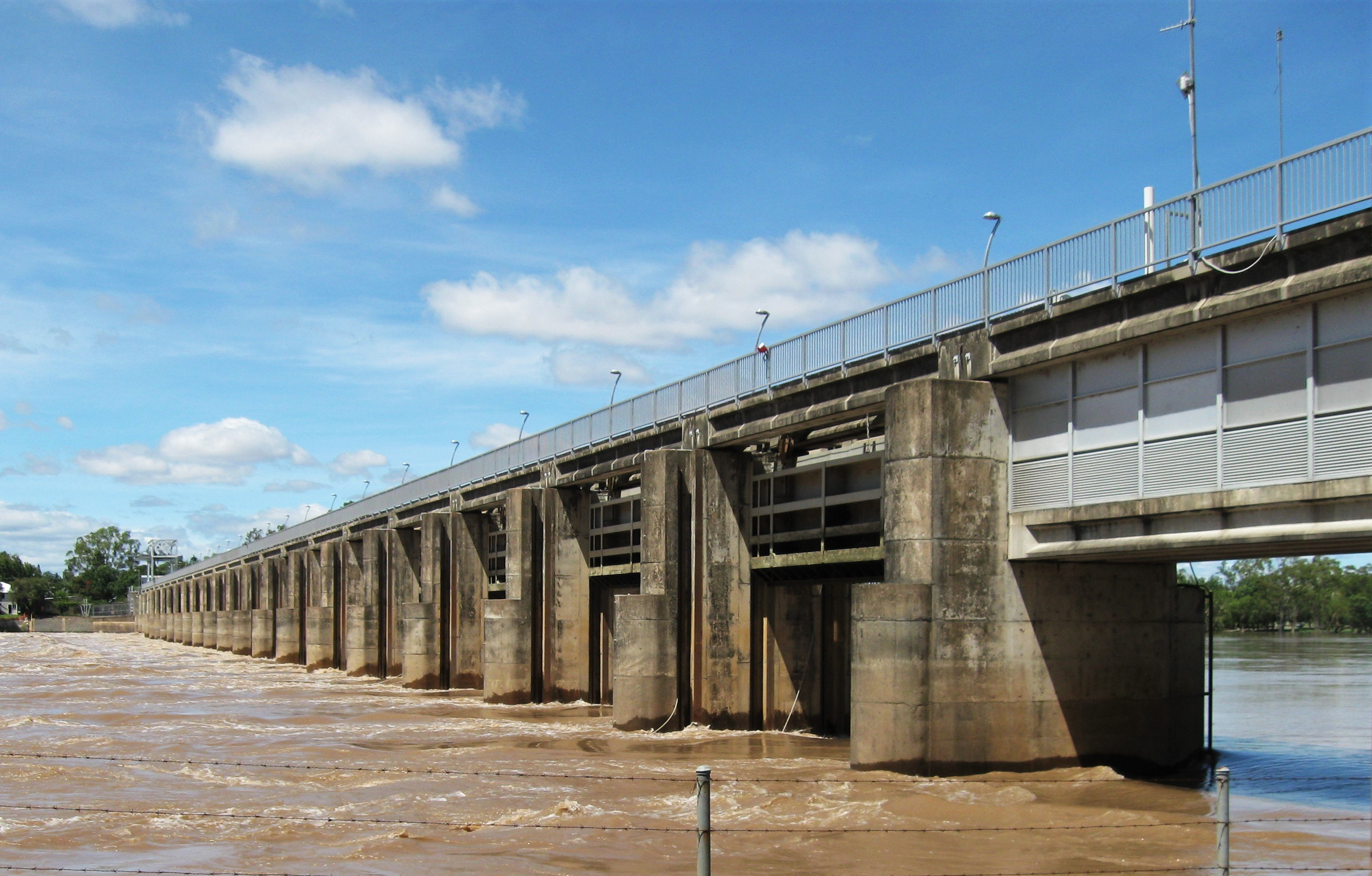
Floodwaters flowing through the barrage after Cyclone Oswald, 2013

After the site at Splitter's Creek was chosen, the first pile to initiate works on the Fitzroy River Barrage was driven in by Minister for Development Alex Dewar on 7 November 1966.

It took over three years to build, with the site operational 24 hours a day, 7 days a week. Concrete was poured on site with cranes used to lay steel in numerous layers throughout the large pillars, with sprinklers needed to run for seven days on top of every newly finished pour to keep the concrete cool. The large concrete pours measured up to 1.2 metres (3.9 ft) thick. Despite the noise and dust associated with the project, the crews working on the project did not receive any complaints from nearby residents.

Some parts of the structure were damaged when the river flooded on two occasions during construction. A large leak was detected after the second cofferdam was completed with crews sourcing a large pump from the Australian Paper mill in Melbourne to find the leak so it could be repaired.

==== Fatalities ====
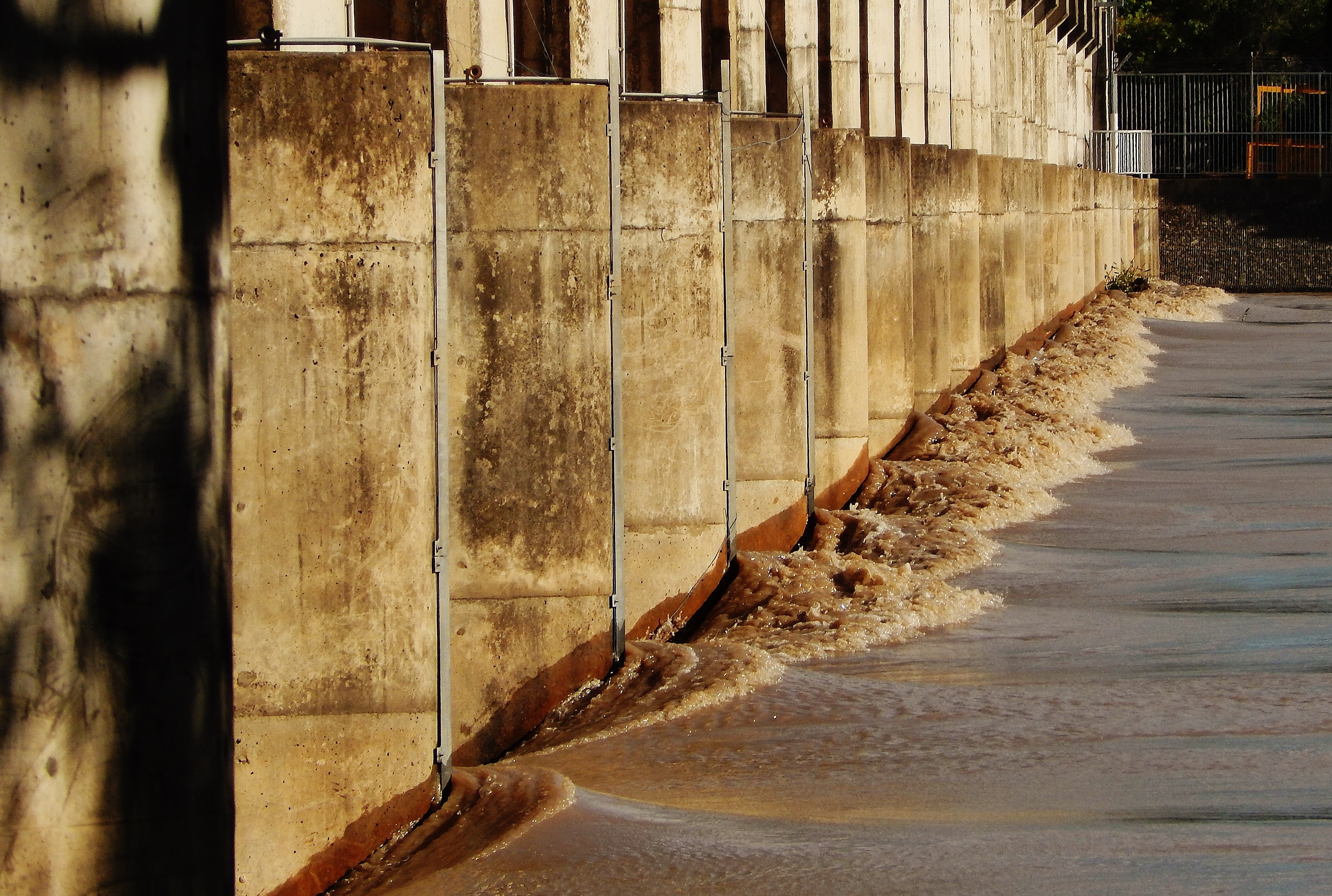
Floodwaters pass through the barrage after Cyclone Debbie, 2017

In 1968, two separate boating accidents near the construction site saw three people killed within five weeks:

- 17-year-old Anthony Boyd Cook and 15-year-old Timothy Wickham were killed on 4 September 1968 while they were exploring the site with another boy, Stephen Ward, in a wooden rowboat. Cook and Wickham were swept away when the boat capsized in the wash from the spillway while Ward managed to climb into a gate recess on the barrage. Ward was rescued by fireman Rob Nebe about an hour later.
- Allan Toohey was killed at the site on 6 October 1968 while he and his brother Daniel Toohey were towing a launch downstream through the barrage. The launch rammed into the stern of their boat, driving it into one of the concrete pillars of the barrage. The brothers were thrown into the water and clung to a bobbing drum with Daniel Toohey managing to climb onto a gate recess. Daniel Toohey attempted to pull his brother to safety but Allan Toohey was dragged under the water. Daniel Toohey was eventually rescued by fireman Bob Collins.

Rockhampton mayor Margaret Strelow unveiled a plaque on 4 September 2015, the 47th anniversary of the first accident, in memory of Anthony Cook (known as Boyd), Timothy Wickham and Allan Toohey and to honour Nebe and Collins for saving the lives of Stephen Ward and Daniel Toohey.

=== Opening ===
The barrage was completed in 1970 and was formally commissioned by Queensland premier Joh Bjelke-Petersen at a community celebration held at the site on 19 March 1970. At the opening, Bjelke-Petesen paid tribute to Pilbeam's "persistence, determination and enterprise" in seeing the Fitzroy River Barrage finally become a reality.

Pilbeam praised Rockhampton City Council engineer Arnold Philp for directing the project so successfully and overcoming unique problems. The chairman of the council's water supply and sewerage committee, Ald Ernest Leslie Wilson Jones, paid tribute to the tradesman who worked on the project and thaned local residents for their patience during the project. Jones said he felt a deep sense of gratitude in seeing "this dream" come true. A fireworks display was held to mark the official opening of the Fitzroy River Barrage.

In 1971, the Glenmore Water Treatment Plant was established just upstream from the barrage near the Glenmore Homestead. The barrage supplies the Glenmore plant with raw water from the river which is treated and turned into drinking water for the local community.

== Details ==
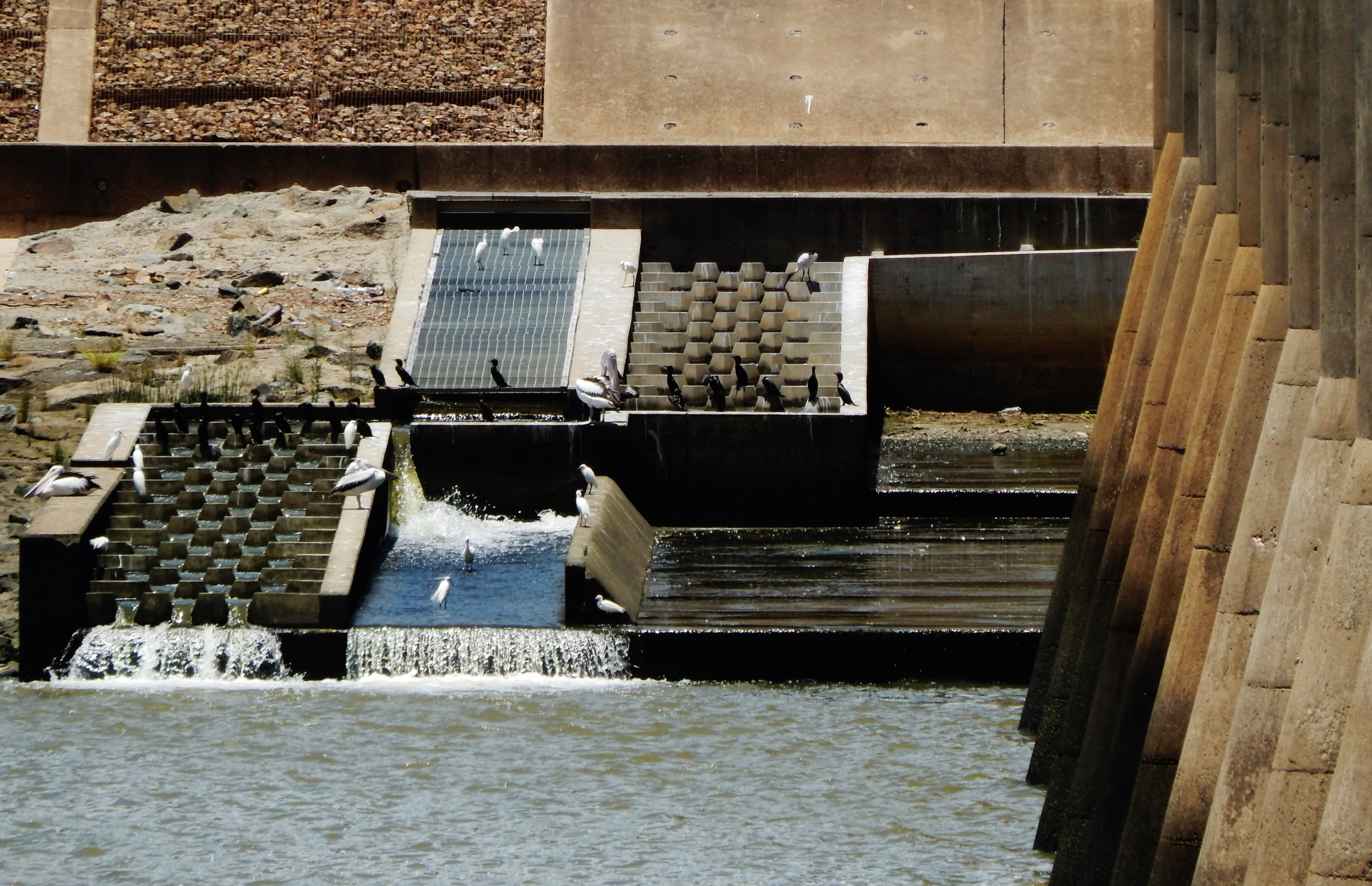
The fish ladder at Fitzroy River Barrage, 2018

The barrage is 10 metres (33 ft) high and 396 metres (1,299 ft) long and holds back 81,800 megalitres (66,300 acre⋅ft) when at full capacity. The surface area of the reservoir is 1,612 hectares (3,980 acres) that extends approximately 60 kilometres (37 mi) upstream from the barrage. The barrage spillway is controlled with 18 lift gates that are computer operated to open up one-by-one when water gets to a certain level, although it would only be in times of flood that all 18 gates are opened.

The barrage also incorporates a fish ladder to allow fish to get from the tidal water to the fresh water and vice versa. The construction of the barrage had a significant impact on native fish species as it prevented them from accessing breeding, spawning and nursery habitats. Although a fish passage was incorporated into the barrage during its construction, it was not very effective as it was designed for North American salmon. A new vertical fish passage was installed in 1996 which was an improvement on the original but it was only effective for eight hours each day during the high tides. The 1996 fish ladder was replaced in 2016 with a new more effective one, at a cost of $500,000.

Crocodiles have been regularly spotted near the barrage.

Fishing and swimming is prohibited within 400 metres (1,300 ft) upstream and downstream of the barrage. For public safety and security, the site is monitored by closed circuit television. Fitzroy River Water noted that between 2012 and 2014, illegal fishing near the barrage was an ongoing issue.

Despite the notion that the barrage would provide Rockhampton with a bountiful supply of water negating the need for Rockhampton residents to pay for the water, Rockhampton City Council controversially introduced water meters in 2005.

Community open days at the barrage were held in 2011, 2014 and 2017 as part of National Water Week; and the latter event attracted approximately 5,000 people. In 2019, it was reported Rockhampton Regional Council were preparing to hold celebrations in 2020 to mark the 50th anniversary since the official opening of the Fitzroy River Barrage but the COVID-19 pandemic prevented this from going ahead.

== See also ==
- List of dams and reservoirs in Australia
- List of tidal barrages
