= Glenmore Homestead, Rockhampton =

Glenmore Homestead
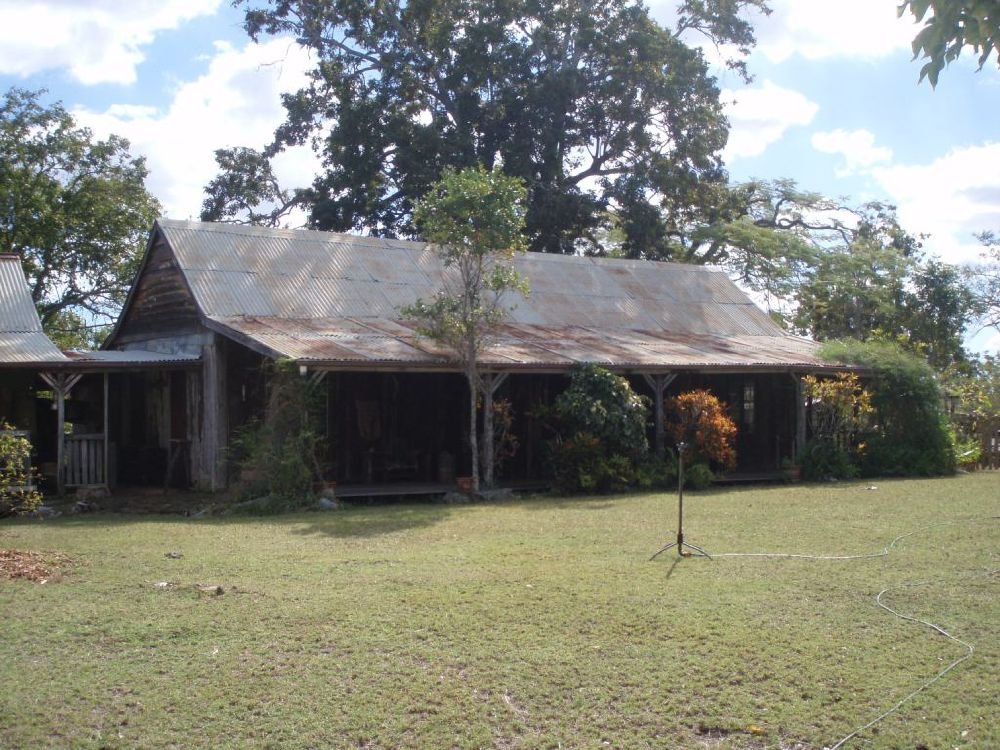
- Glenmore Homestead, 2009

- Location within Queensland
- 23.3144°S 150.4843°E
- Location: Belmont Road, Parkhurst, Rockhampton Region, Queensland, Australia

History
- Design period: 1840s - 1860s (mid-19th century)
- Built: c. 1858 - c. 1920

Queensland Heritage Register
- Official name: Glenmore Homestead
- Type: state heritage (built)
- Designated: 21 October 1992
- Reference no.: 600823
- Significant period: 1860s-1870s (historical)
- Significant components: store/s / storeroom / storehouse, residential accommodation - main house, furniture/fittings

Glenmore Homestead is a heritage-listed homestead at Belmont Road, Parkhurst, Rockhampton Region, Queensland, Australia. It was built from c. 1858 to c. 1920. The homestead and associated buildings once belonged to pastoral run on the Fitzroy River, seven kilometres northwest of Rockhampton, Queensland. Originally much larger at 127 square miles the current size of the property is 20 acres (8.1 ha). It was added to the Queensland Heritage Register on 21 October 1992.

== History ==
The grazing property was originally settled in 1858 by leaseholder John Arthur McCartney. In 1860, Macartney opposed a proposal to establish a municipality for Rockhampton with a proposed area of about 225 square kilometres. Glenmore, on the northern side of the river, was as vulnerable as Gracemere Station (the proposed boundaries of the municipality included the head station and Gracemere Homestead). Glenmore, however, did not have the substantial homestead and outbuildings like Gracemere. Eventually, the boundaries for the Municipality of Rockhampton were established as the usual five square miles.

In 1861 the Birkbeck family arrived in Rockhampton from Mexico to inspect grazing land after Samuel Bradford Birkbeck had spent half his lifetime as a mining engineer and manager of a silver mine. Birkbeck had worked on his father's farm in Illinois, USA, during his youth, but had no experience of Australian pastoral life. On 14 January 1864, the land was purchased by Birkbeck and his Spanish-Mexican wife, Damiana de Barre Valdez. The Birkbecks had eight sons and one daughter, Elena.

In July 1865, residents expressed anxieties about the presence of natives in the vicinity and a group of Native Police attacked members of the Darumbal tribe and massacred up to 18 of them, and then burnt their corpses.

Sheep were raised on the property but due to a poor climate for that purpose the Birbecks turned to cattle. They imported 1,500 from Texas.

He died in 1867. The property has remained in the family and up until the 1980s, members of the family resided in the limestone brick cottage and the slab building.

At the time of the arrival of the Birkbeck family, Glenmore Homestead consisted of a four-roomed slab house and two log cabins which were included as part of the station's improvements. It is believed that Macartney constructed the log cabin in 1859 and is reputed to be the oldest building north of the Fitzroy River. In the last fifty years it has been used for storage. It is not clear what became of the four-roomed slab house and second log cabin. No longer extant, it is possible that these may have been removed as new buildings were constructed.

The buildings proved inadequate for the needs of the Birkbeck family. Birkbeck bought a large slab building and re-erected it on his property. Constructed c. 1858, the slab house was originally used as a hotel at Parkhurst and was moved to Glenmore in 1861. The slab homestead (known also as the Bush Inn) was built as an inn on the northern road to the Canoona goldfield. The limestone brick cottage was constructed by Dennis Cifuentes in 1862. Cifuentes came out from Mexico with the support of the Birkbeck family. The building was to be the beginning of a large, hacienda-style homestead, however, this was never completed. Later, Cifuentes took up a block in partnership with Carlos Birkbeck and, in 1874, took up 100 acres (40 ha) on the Cawarral Run.

In a desire to achieve closer settlement, the Queensland Government undertook a program of resuming all or parts of larger estates and then offering the land as a number of smaller lots to selectors. As early as 1862, the Birkbecks were aware of surveys of agricultural land taking place on the town side of their run. Samuel Birkbeck died in 1867 and his sons, Robert, Alfred and Carlos, were left to manage the property. The Birkbecks were the first in the Central District to be directly affected by the Crown Lands Alienation Act 1868. On 1 January 1869, over seven thousand hectares of the Glenmore run (over half of the Glenmore estate) was resumed and opened to selection. Although the Birbecks were offered a pre-emptive selection, in order to keep hold of some of their former land, the Birkbecks each selected blocks on the resumed half.

The blacksmith's shop constructed on the property by c. 1890, with the sheds being constructed by 1920. Other buildings have been constructed more recently, including a kitchen and dance hall and the owners residence. The "Walter and Eliza Hall Cottage" was moved to the site in 1985. In 1913, Eliza Hall donated £100 towards the provision of small homes for aged couples. It appears that the cottage was one of four constructed c. 1914 within the grounds of the Benevolent Society.

Until the 1980s, the Birkbeck family lived in the original homestead. In the early 1980s, the house was opened to the public as a heritage tourism and functions centre, owned and operated by George Louis Birkbeck. A souvenir shop was built in 1985. Other late-19th century and early 20th century farm buildings are also on site.

The balance of the land that remains as a portion of the original property is owned by Arthur James Birkbeck (eldest son of Tolstoy Carlos Birkbeck) and managed by Mark Jason Birkbeck, his second son.

== Description ==
The buildings at Glenmore Homestead are interesting, as they show several types of early dwelling in the Central Queensland area. They consist of a log cabin which was built in 1859 by McCartney, a slab cottage which built in 1858 as a hotel in nearby Parkhurst and moved to the site by Samuel Birkbeck in 1861 as well as a brick cottage which was built by a Mexican employee of the Birkbeck family in 1862. This was originally to be part of a larger hacienda-style homestead, which was never completed. The slab homestead was built on a short-lived gold field called Canoona.

The property is located on the east bank of the Fitzroy River, seven kilometres northwest of Rockhampton. The place is a homestead complex comprising successive residences of varying construction methods, including log cabin construction; a slab building and a limestone brick cottage with adobe gables.

The buildings included in the heritage register boundary include the log cabin (c. 1858-59); the slab homestead (c. 1858 and moved to Glenmore in 1861); the rendered limestone brick cottage (1862); a timber blacksmith's shop (c. 1890) and timber framed sheds (c. 1920). Other buildings located on the property include a souvenir shop constructed in 1985; a kitchen and dance hall constructed 1984; the owner's residence and shed and the former "Walter and Eliza Hall Cottage", relocated to the site in 1985. These buildings are not considered to be of cultural heritage significance.

=== Log cabin ===
The log cabin is a one-room hut built of horizontal logs checked into each other at the corners and lined with bark. Corrugated iron has been placed over shingled roof. The log cabin is currently used for storage of agricultural and other items associated with Glenmore.

=== Homestead building ===
Placed upon a stone foundation when moved to the site in 1861, the vertical slab building is an eight-room structure, approximately twelve and a half metres long by five and a half metres wide, with a verandah on the western and eastern sides. French doors open along the entire length of the eastern verandah. The roof is clad with corrugated iron. A two-roomed, timber extension, originally housing a kitchen, is located to the south-western end of the slab building.

Internally, the main room is presented as the dining room. Rooms located at either of the main dining room opening onto the verandah as well as to the rear, or south-west section, of the building. The homestead building is no longer used by the Birkbeck family. Visitors to Glenmore can are able to view the inside of the building from the verandah.

=== Limestone brick cottage ===
A T-shaped building, the four-roomed, limestone brick cottage has lime-based, rendered walls with adobe gables, with a verandah on the south-western side. The roof is clad with the original gospel oak iron. The external walls are approximately 53 centimetres (21 in) thick and the interior walls approximately 50 centimetres (20 in) thick. Ceilings are of milled timber.

The largest room in the house is furnished as a sitting room. The sitting room contains many items which were brought from Mexico, including Damiana Birkbeck's silver crucifix, made in Italy, which sits on a small table with rosary beads in a box made of silky oak; two matching occasional tables; family portraits and musical instruments, including a guitar and mandolin. Two rooms have been set up with display cases. The fourth room is currently used for storage.

A toilet, constructed from stone quarried on the property, is located to the north-west of the cottage. A lavatory, comprising a timber beam supported by two timber uprights, with a concave tin plate on the ground, stands nearby. The timber framed shed which was constructed to house the lavatory, is no longer extant.

== Heritage listing ==
Glenmore Homestead was listed on the Queensland Heritage Register on 21 October 1992 having satisfied the following criteria.

The place is important in demonstrating the evolution or pattern of Queensland's history.

Glenmore Homestead is important in demonstrating the development of the Rockhampton District, illustrating the pattern of early European exploration and settlement of Queensland. Taken up by the Birkbeck family in 1864, the complex is further significant as it is still in the ownership of the same family.

Glenmore Homestead is significant as a complex that provides a record of an evolving pastoral property comprising successive residences of varying construction methods, including a hut of horizontal log construction with extant shingle roof; slab-built homestead and a rendered limestone brick cottage, as well as associated outbuildings and structures, including a limestone toilet and water tank.

The place is important in demonstrating the principal characteristics of a particular class of cultural places.

The homestead is important in demonstrating the principal characteristics of early Queensland homesteads, constructed as the head station of a large run. The various additions, dating from the 1860s, demonstrate the growth of the Birkbeck family.

The place is important because of its aesthetic significance.

Surrounded by mature vegetation including Ficus sp. and Burdekin plum trees, the complex has aesthetic significance.

The place has a strong or special association with a particular community or cultural group for social, cultural or spiritual reasons.

Glenmore Homestead has a special association with the life and work of several generations of the Birkbeck family who contributed to the development of the surrounding area.
