= Fitzroy River (Queensland) =

River in Queensland, Australia

Fitzroy
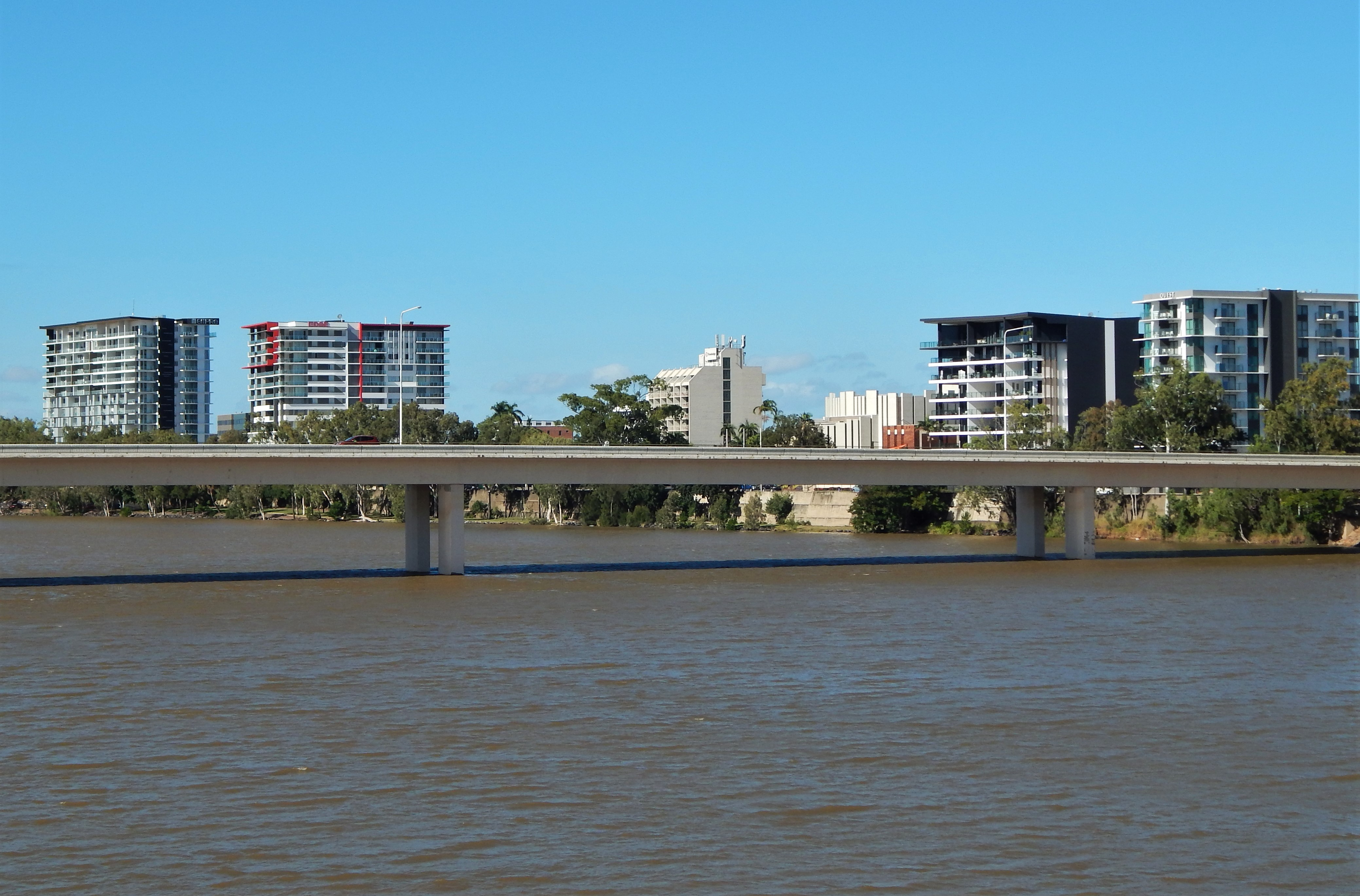
- A view of the river, the Neville Hewitt Bridge, and some of the riverfront apartments in Rockhampton

- Location of Fitzroy River mouth in Queensland
- Etymology: In honour of Sir Charles FitzRoy
- Native name: Toonooba (Dharumbal)

Location
- Country: Australia
- State: Queensland
- Region: Central Queensland
- City: Rockhampton

Physical characteristics
- Source confluence: Dawson River and Mackenzie River
  - coordinates: 23°37′39″S 149°46′1″E
- Mouth: Coral Sea
  - location: near Port Alma
  - coordinates: 23°32′15″S 150°53′13″E
  - elevation: 0 m (0 ft)
- Length: 480 km (300 mi)
- Basin size: 142,665 km^{2} (55,083 sq mi)
- Discharge
  - average: 187 m^{3}/s (6,600 cu ft/s)

Basin features
- Waterbodies: Rookwood Weir; Eden Bann Weir; Fitzroy River Barrage
- Bridges: Alexandra Railway Bridge; Fitzroy Bridge (1952); Neville Hewitt Bridge; Fitzroy Bridge (1881—1956)
- National park: Goodedulla National Park

The Fitzroy River (Darumbal: Toonooba) is a river in Central Queensland, Australia. Its catchment covers an area of 142,665 square kilometres (55,083 sq mi), making it the largest river catchment flowing to the eastern coast of Australia. It is also the largest river basin that discharges onto the Great Barrier Reef.

== Course and features ==
Formed by the confluence of the Mackenzie and Dawson rivers that drain the Expedition Range and the Carnarvon Range respectively, the Fitzroy River rises near Duaringa and flows initially north by east, then northward near the Goodedulla National Park. The river then flows in an easterly direction near the Lake Learmouth State Forest and parallel with the Bruce Highway through the settlement of Yaamba, before turning south to Rockhampton where the river is crossed by the Bruce Highway. After flowing through Rockhampton, the river flows south by east past the Berserker Range past Humbug Point to the south of the Flat Top Range and eventually discharging into Keppel Bay in the Coral Sea near the MacKenzie Island Conservation Park.

From source to mouth, the Fitzroy River is joined by thirty-six tributaries including the Mackenzie River – with its tributaries the Nogoa River, Comet River, Isaac River and its tributary Connors River; and the Dawson River – which has two tributaries, the Don River and Dee River.

=== Catchment ===
The catchment area of the river occupies an area of 142,665 square kilometres (55,083 sq mi) Within the drainage basin an area of 292 square kilometres (113 sq mi) is composed of estuarine wetlands and an area of 1,548 square kilometres (598 sq mi) is made up of riverine wetlands. The catchment stretches from the Carnarvon Range in the west to the rivermouth in Keppel Bay, near Rockhampton. It is bounded to the north by the Burdekin River catchment area and to the south by the Burnett River catchment area.

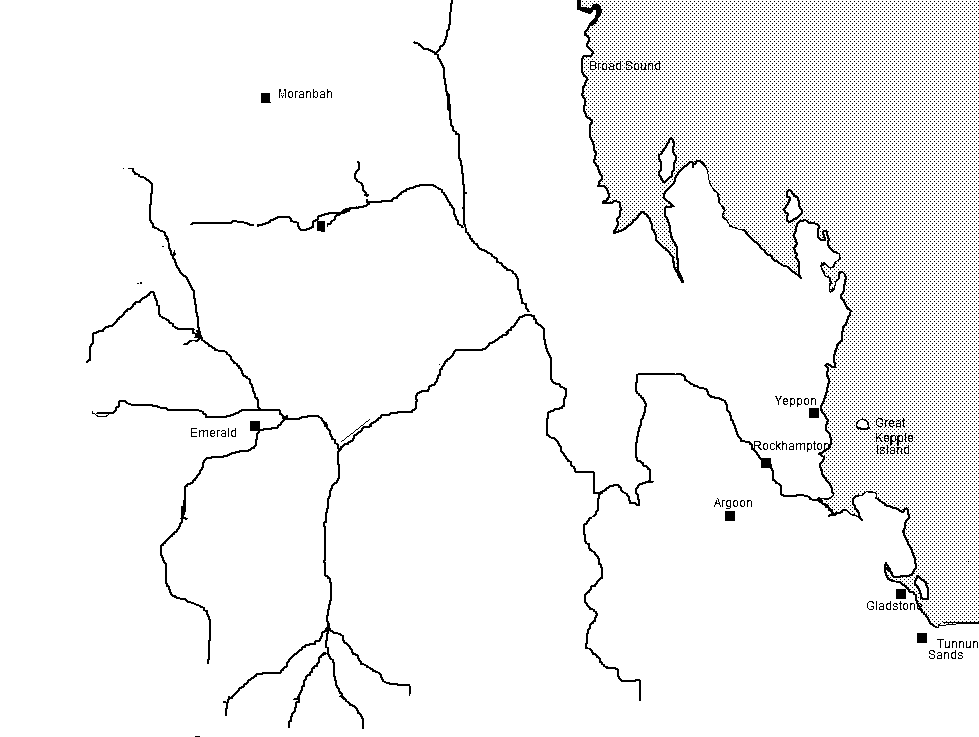
Black and white map of the river's catchment area

The river has a mean annual discharge of 5,900 gigalitres (7.717×10^{9} cu yd). There are also several important aquifers providing groundwater extractions in the Fitzroy Basin.

The Fitzroy River basin is one of a number that experienced extensive flooding during the 2010–11 Queensland floods. In 2013, flash flooding in the Mount Morgan and Biloela regions brought major flooding to the lower Dawson River catchment. The Don River and the Dee River also rose to new record heights. The Fitzroy River at Rockhampton rose above major flooding to 8.61 metres (28.2 ft).

=== Reservoirs ===
The Fitzroy River catchment system has many weirs and dams, used for farming, mining and domestic consumption.

In the Dawson River sub-catchment, the major reservoirs from source to mouth are the Glebe Weir, the Gyranda Weir, the Theodore Weir, the Moura Weir, the Callide Dam, and the Kroombit Dam.

In the Mackenzie River sub-catchment, the major reservoirs are the Comet Weir, the Fairbairn Dam, the Theresa Creek Dam, the Bedford Weir, the Bingegang Weir, and the Tartrus Weir. The Fairbairn Dam on the Nogoa River and several weirs downstream on the Mackenzie River provide water for irrigating a wide range of crops including cotton, peanuts, chickpea, corn and horticulture including citrus, table grapes, melons, supplying water for coal mines and domestic use for the town of Emerald.

In the main Fitzroy River itself, the 80,000-megalitre (1.8×10^{10} imp gal; 2.1×10^{10} US gal) Rookwood Weir is predominately used for irrigation of agricultural land in the river's upper reaches; and in the lower reaches, the Eden Bann Weir and the Fitzroy River Barrage, with the latter capable of holding 61,000 megalitres (1.3×10^{10} imp gal; 1.6×10^{10} US gal) when full, provide potable water to Rockhampton city and surrounds.

== History ==
The traditional owners of the area in the Fitzroy River catchment are the Darumbal people, notably the Baiali and Jetimarala clans. They call the river Toonooba.

The river was given its English name by European colonial settlers and pastoralists, Charles and William Archer, on 4 May 1853 in honour of Sir Charles FitzRoy, at the time the Governor of the Colony of New South Wales, as Queensland did not become a separate colony until 1859. The famous boatbuilder Colin Archer was the first known individual to sail up the river, with his cutter "Ellida".

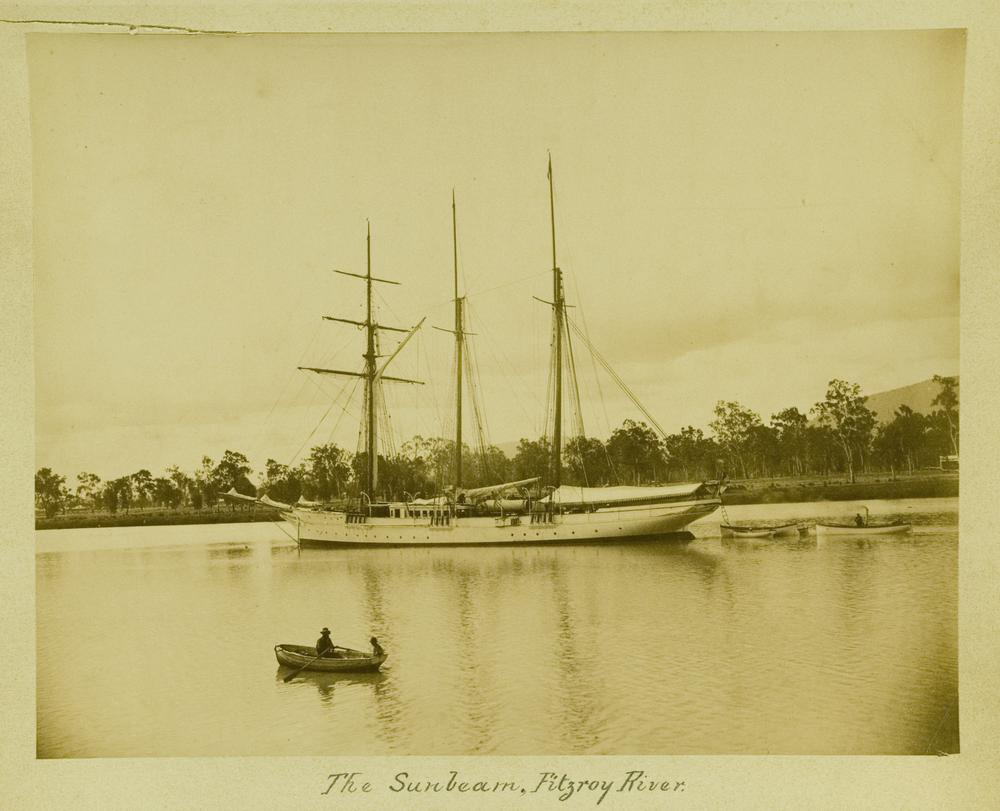
Sailing ship Sunbeam, moored on the Fitzroy River, c. 1887

The city of Rockhampton is situated on the river, some 40 kilometres (25 mi) from the coast. During the 19th and early 20th centuries, the city was a major port, however rocky bars in the river prevented the Fitzroy from being used for navigation any further inland. As ships became larger, the lower reaches became less viable for commercial traffic, and today only pleasure craft and small commercial fishing boats use the river. Wharves which once lined the town reach at Rockhampton have now almost all disintegrated or been removed. Port Alma, in the Fitzroy River delta is now the nearest port to Rockhampton. Predominant industries in the catchment are coal mining, grazing and cotton.

Glenmore Homestead was built at a property on the northern bank of the river seven kilometres (4.3 mi) northwest of Rockhampton. It was originally settled in 1858, is listed on the Queensland Heritage Register and operates as a tourist attraction today.

The Fitzroy River in Rockhampton is often utilised for recreation. The Rockhampton Ski Gardens on the Fitzroy River just upstream from the Fitzroy River Barrage is used by sporting groups such as the local water skiing, dragon boat and rowing clubs. In 2018, a $36 million revitalisation of the Fitzroy riverbank in Rockhampton City was officially opened. Rockhampton's annual Rocky River Run is also held along the Fitzroy River. The annual fishing competition, the Barra Bounty is another event held on the Fitzroy River in Rockhampton. The city celebrates the Fitzroy River each year at the river's own annual festival, the Rockhampton River Festival.

In 2018, the Fitzroy River in Rockhampton was incorporated into the Queen's Baton Relay prior to the 2018 Commonwealth Games. After running his leg of the relay, batonbearer Mark Knowles handed the Queen's Baton to fellow batonbearer Craig McCormack who was then rowed across the river on a dragon boat as part of the relay.

Rowing and canoeing events during the 2032 Olympic and Paralympic Games will be held on the Fitzroy River.

== Wildlife ==
The lower reaches of the river are home to salt water crocodiles. In 2003 a crocodile measuring more than 4 metres (13 ft) long was captured. The most diverse range of freshwater fish in the country are found within the Fitzroy basin. The prized Australian fish, the barramundi, breeds in the river along with sooty grunter and a separate genetic strain of golden perch.

Some 987 square kilometres (381 sq mi) of the river's floodplain and delta have been classified by BirdLife International as the Fitzroy Floodplain and Delta Important Bird Area (IBA). It regularly supports over 1% of the world population of the sharp-tailed sandpiper as well as having a resident breeding population of the range-restricted mangrove honeyeater.

At the mouth of the river researchers have discovered a genetically distinct snubfin dolphins species with a population of just 70 animals. The World Wildlife Fund had concerns that a planned coal port on Balaclava Island by Xstrata could wipe out the local snubfin population. In 2013 Glencore Xstrata halted its plans for the coal port due to high costs and massively reduced worldwide demand for coal. The firm cited a poor medium-term outlook for the coal industry.

== Gallery ==
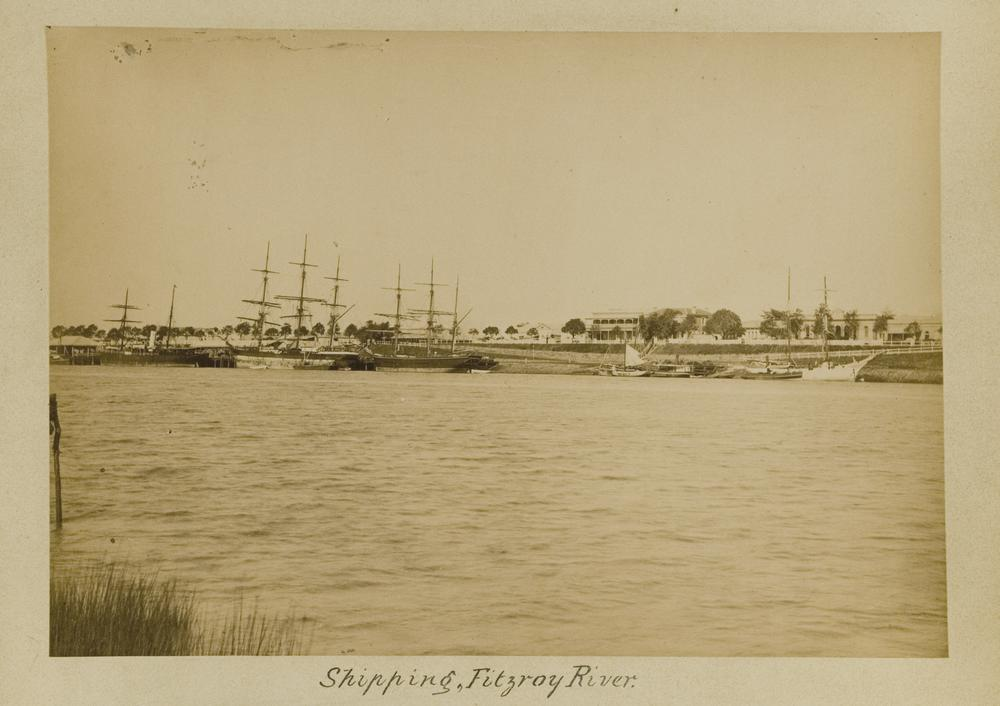
Shipping on the Fitzroy River, Rockhampton wharves, c. 1887

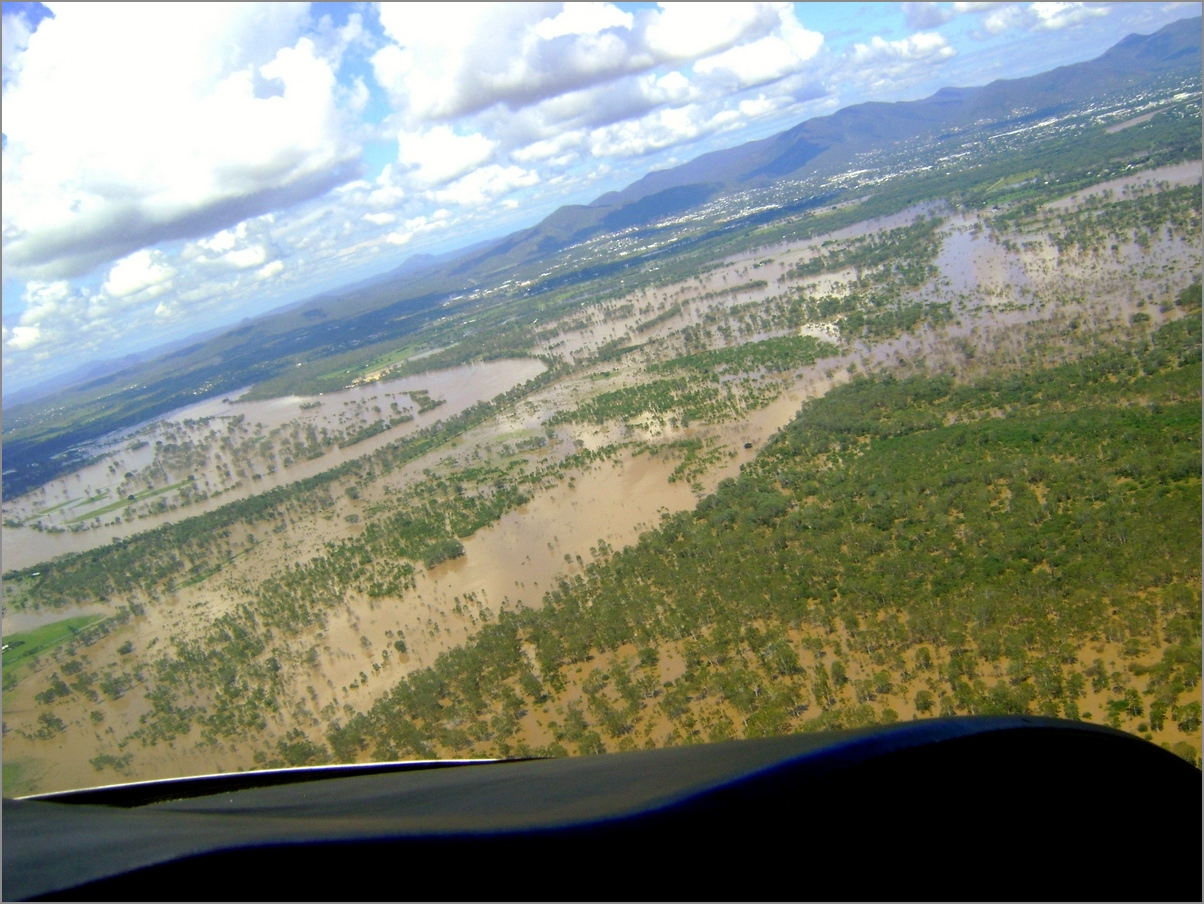
Rockhampton in flood

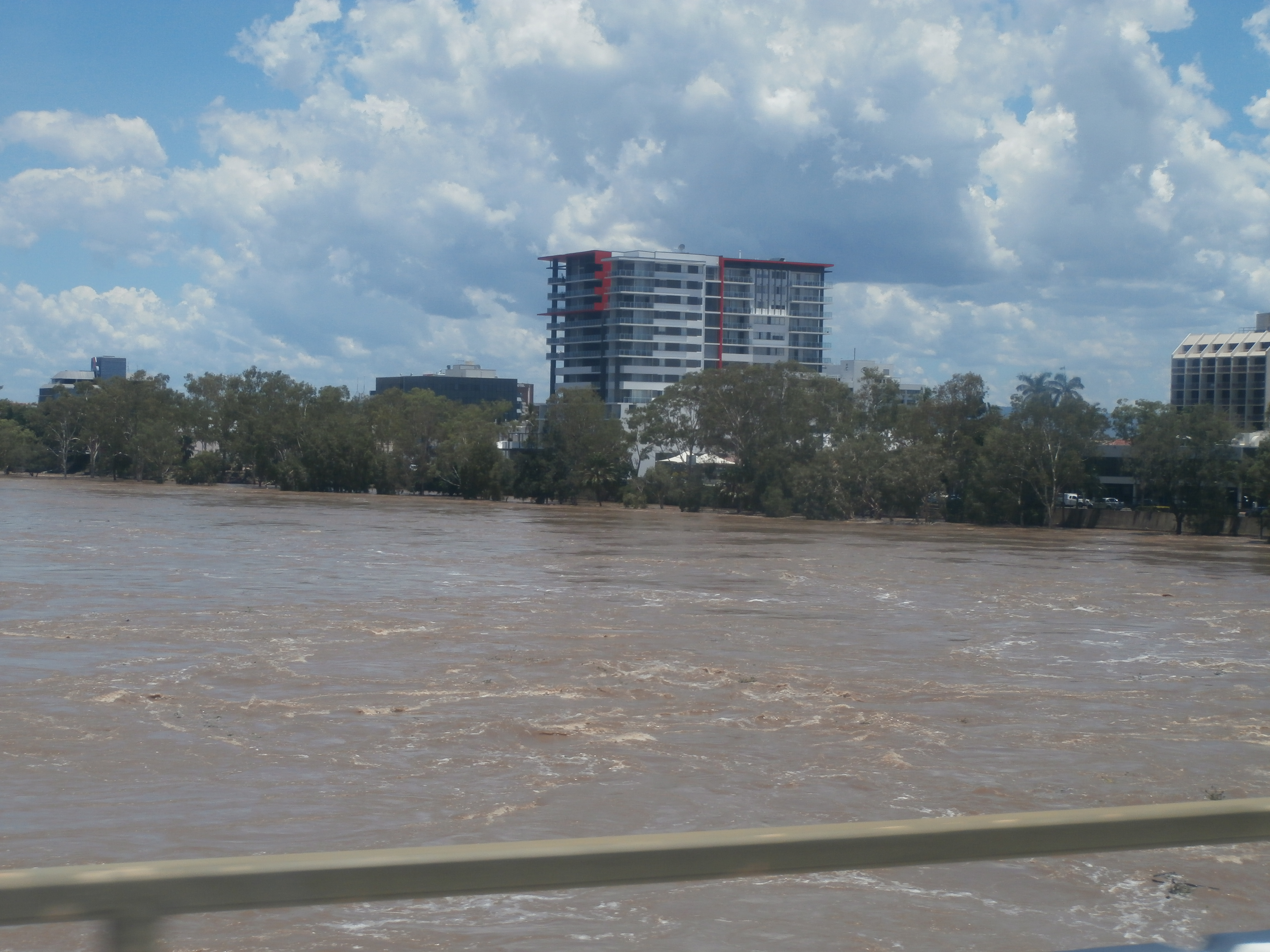
Rockhampton in flood, 2013

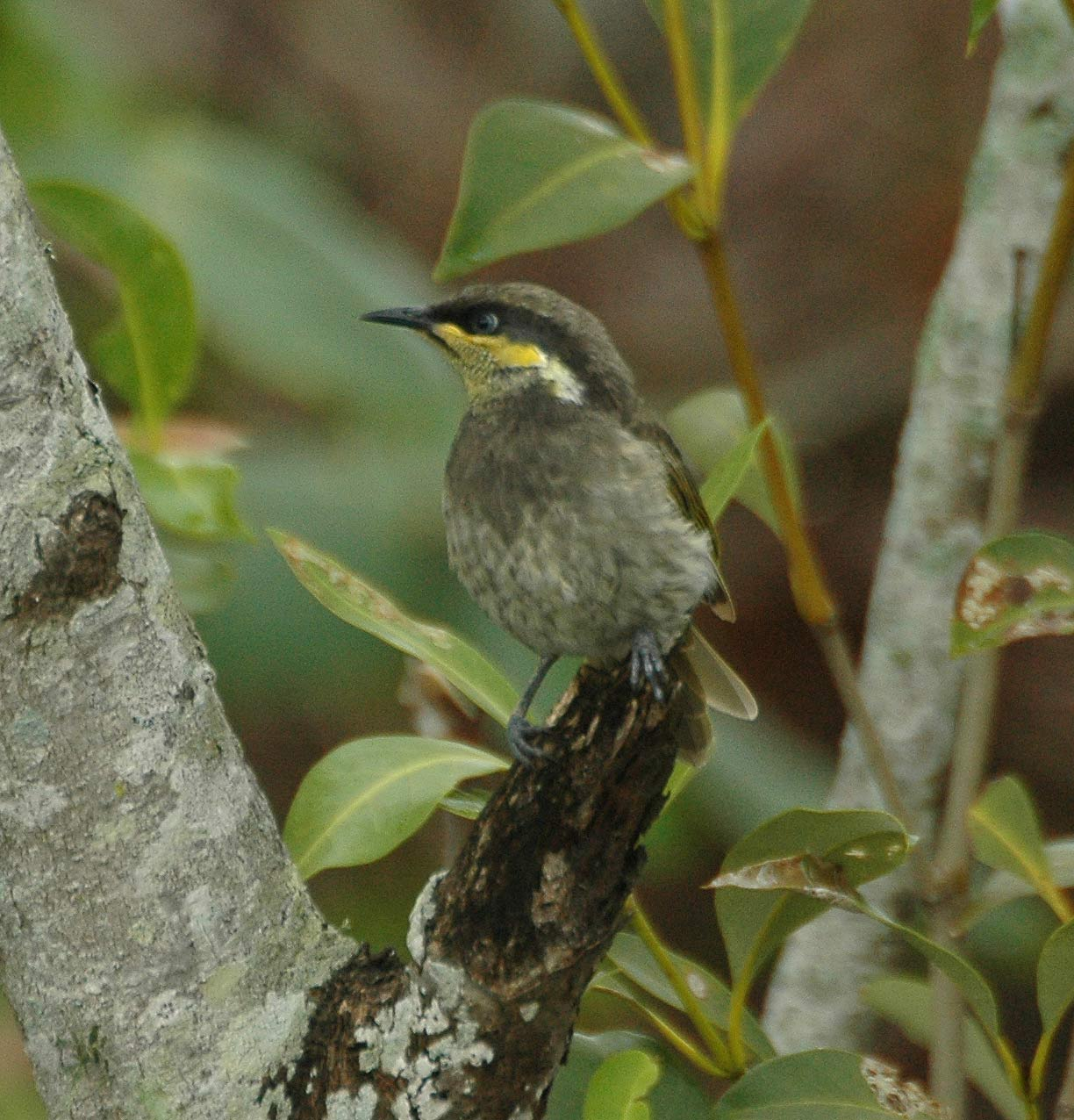
The lower reaches of the river are an important site for mangrove honeyeaters

== See also ==
- List of rivers of Australia § Queensland
