= Goodedulla National Park =

National park in Queensland, Australia

- IUCN category II (national park)
- Location within Queensland
- Location: Queensland
- Nearest city: Westwood or Duaringa
- Coordinates: 23°15′15″S 149°45′29″E
- Area: 255 km^{2} (98 sq mi)
- Established: 1994
- Governing body: Queensland Parks and Wildlife Service
- Website: Official website

Goodedulla is a national park in Queensland, Australia, 573 km (356 mi) northwest of Brisbane. The park is located in the centre of the Brigalow Belt.

Access to the park is by four-wheel-drive vehicle only. Camping requires a permit and is available at three locations; Wadlow Yards, Kings Dam and The Palms, although none of the three have any facilities.

The average elevation of the terrain is 147 metres. 399 species of wild animals have been recorded in the park.

== See also ==
- Protected areas of Queensland
