= North Rockhampton =

North Rockhampton Rockhampton, Queensland
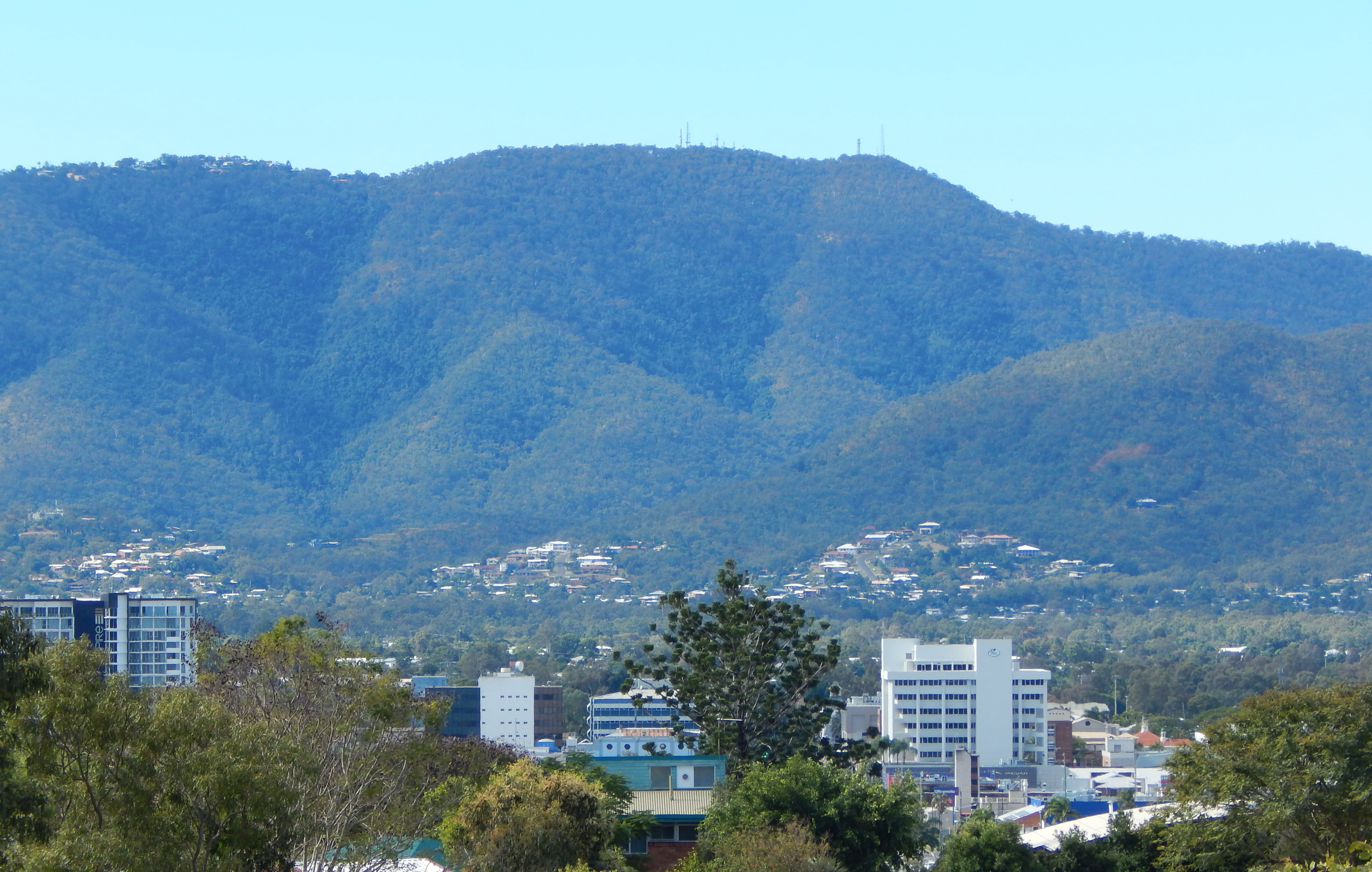
- Mount Archer, a suburb in northeastern Rockhampton
- LGA(s): Rockhampton Region
- State electorate(s): Keppel; Rockhampton
- Federal division(s): Capricornia

North Rockhampton is the common name for the suburbs of Rockhampton located on the north-east side of the Fitzroy River in Queensland, Australia.

It may also refer more specifically to the location of the North Rockhampton railway station or the former Town of North Rockhampton.

== History ==
The Darumbal (Tarumbul, Tharoombool) language region includes the city of Rockhampton extending south towards Raglan Creek and north towards the Styx River and inland along the Broad Sound Ranges, including locations of Rockhampton, North Rockhampton, Shoalwater Bay and Yaamba.
