= Thomas Joseph Lee =

Australian politician (1890–1969)

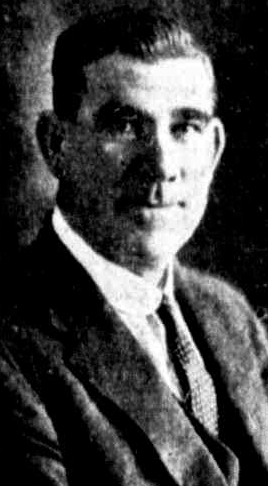
- Thomas Joseph Lee, 1935

Mayor of Rockhampton
- In office 1930–1936
- Monarchs: George V, Edward VIII
- Governors General: Lord Stonehaven, Sir Isaac Isaacs, Lord Gowrie
- Prime Minister: James Scullin, Joseph Lyons
- Preceded by: Robert Cousins
- Succeeded by: Robert William Evans

Personal details
- Born: 20 June 1890 Maryborough, Queensland
- Died: 9 July 1969 (aged 79)
- Party: Australian Labor Party
- Spouse: Cecilia Lee (m. 1913; died 1969)
- Occupation: Train guard with Queensland Railways

Thomas Joseph Lee (26 June 1890 – 9 July 1969) was an Australian politician, best known for being the mayor of the City of Rockhampton between 14 April 1930 and 20 April 1936.

Despite only serving a total of six years as mayor, Lee's two terms during the interwar period were quite an active period in which he played a pivotal role, with significant cultural developments occurring in the city. This included improvement and advancements in sanitation, healthcare, transport, beautification and entertainment.

== Early life ==
Lee was born in Maryborough and from the age of four lived with his family in Howard where he was educated until the age of 15.

Aged 15, he went to Mount Morgan where he gained employment as a millhand with the Mount Morgan Gold Mining Company. It was when he was working at the mine, he first became involved in union activities, forming a local branch of the Timber Worker's Union.

== Public life ==
After staying with the Mount Morgan Gold Mining Company for six years, Lee began working for Queensland Railways where he continued his involvement in union activities. He rose through the ranks to become district president and state vice-president of the Australian Railways Union.

From September 1930, Lee served as a member of the Rockhampton Hospitals Board.

Lee was also a member of the Rockhampton Fire Brigade Board where he was appointed as a government representative in 1938.

== Local government ==
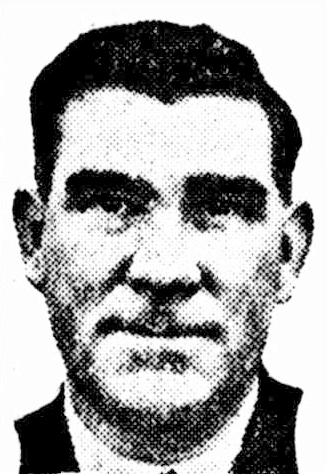
Thomas Joseph Lee, 1933

Lee was first elected as an alderman with Rockhampton City Council in 1927.

He ran for mayor at the triennial local government elections in 1930 and was elected in somewhat unusual circumstances.

Following a tight race between Lee and his opponents, Leonard Garfield Haigh and incumbent Robert Cousins, no official winner was declared and it was decided the mayor would be decided with a secret ballot at a special council meeting on 14 April 1930.

Seven out of the ten alderman nominated themselves for the position, which was ultimately won by Lee.

Upon his election as mayor, Lee took leave from his position at the railways without pay. Lee's work with the railways arguably put him in good stead when he was required to convene a number of public meetings six months after his election when industrial action was taken by local railway employees who alleged victimisation against union officials.

In her book, Rockhampton: A history of city and district, historian Lorna McDonald proclaimed that when Lee was elected as mayor, the "modern era had begun" illustrated by the fact that Lee organised a press photographer to take candid photographs of the aldermen without any prior warning.

Two high-profile deaths in Rockhampton occurred within a year of Lee's first term, and he was called upon to serve as a pallbearer at both funerals.

The funeral of French-born Roman Catholic priest Pierre-Marie Bucas was held at St Joseph's Cathedral on 24 October 1930 following his death at the Mater Misericordiae Hospital the previous day. St Joseph's Cathedral hosted another major funeral on 9 April 1931 when a large crowd gathered to farewell the Bishop of Rockhampton, Joseph Shiel who had died in office two days prior.

Lee also served as a pallbearer at the funerals of his predecessor, former mayor Robert Cousins who died in 1933, council alderman Colonel David Day Dawson who died in 1935 and former city council medical officer Dr Henry Brown who died in 1931.

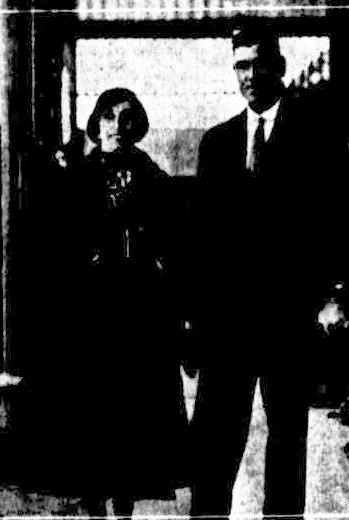
Thomas Joseph Lee (right) with Amelita Galli-Curci, 1932

The opening of the new Rockhampton Aerodrome just prior to Lee becoming mayor saw him take on the role of greeting and hosting a stream of high-profile visitors who began arriving in Rockhampton by air, as well as those who continued to arrive by rail and road. During his two terms as mayor, visiting dignitaries included Jan Kubelik, Muriel Brunskill, Charles Kingsford Smith, Joseph and Enid Lyons, Leslie Wilson, John Latham, Frank Kurtz, Maiola Kalili Ned Hanlon, Boy Charlton, and Amelita Galli-Curci amongst others.

Just prior to Kingsford-Smith's arrival into Rockhampton in 1932, Captain Harold Livingstone Fraser took Lee up as a passenger aboard a Rockhampton Aero Club aircraft to "greet" Kingsford-Smith in what was Lee's first flight.

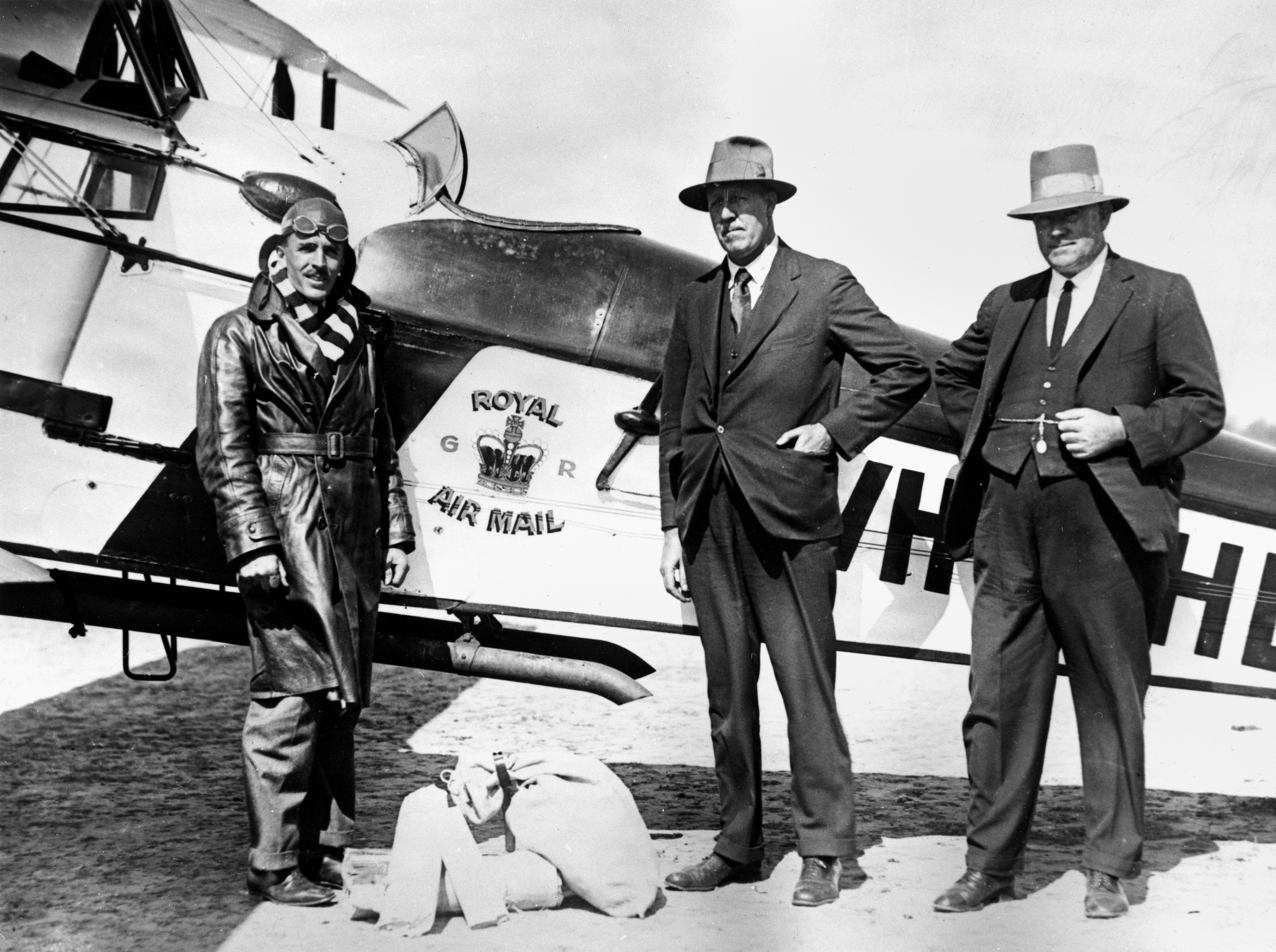
Thomas Joseph Lee (right) receiving Rockhampton's first airmail from pilot Lester Brain (left) and Robert Conochie (centre) at the Connor Park Aerodrome, 1931

On 7 May 1931, Lee welcomed the Qantas aircraft Atlanta, piloted by Lester Brain, which touched down at the Rockhampton Aerodrome during the inaugural Brisbane to Townsville airmail service.

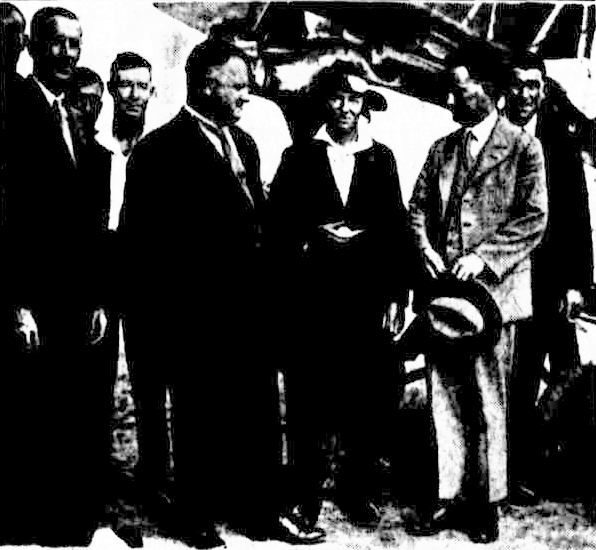
Thomas Joseph Lee (far right) at the presentation of the Shell Oil Company's Aviation Plaque to Victor Roffey, 1932

Lee also hosted a civic reception for Victor Roffey following Roffey's historic flight from New Caledonia to Australia in 1931.

With increasing car ownership, road transport networks were becoming an important issue and in 1932, Lee signed a petition along with 81 local businessmen who were lobbying to have the road between Rockhampton and Yaamba declared a state highway.

The advancement of technology saw radio stations and talking pictures in the city for the first time during Lee's first term with Lee officially opening the "talkies" at Earl's Court and the Tivoli Theatre shortly after becoming mayor.

When the Post-Master General of Australia Albert Green officially opened the city's first radio station 4RK remotely from Canberra in 1931, Lee responded at the official function at the Rockhampton School of Arts by saying he accepted the station on behalf of the people of Rockhampton and the central district. Lee said he trusted the station would be met with the support and success it deserves. After undergoing a name change in 2000 to ABC Capricornia, the station celebrated its 90th anniversary in 2021.

At the official opening of 4RO in 1932, Lee observed that it was the second such occasion which he had been present during his time as the city's mayor following the successful launch of 4RK the previous year. With 4RO's opening, Rockhampton became the first regional city in Queensland to have two radio stations on the air. He concluded his remarks by wishing everyone many happy hours of radio amusement and wished 4RO the best of luck. In 2022, the station celebrated its 90th anniversary.

Lee used both 4RK and 4RO to communicate directly with local residents which included a public address upon the death of King George V when he said the citizens of Rockhampton joined with other parts of the British Empire in expressing regret at the death of the king.

The way people shopped was also beginning to change with Lee being afforded the opportunity to tour Rockhampton's first Woolworths in 1933 prior to its opening in the CBD.

Lee was credited with making considerable progress with parks and the curator of the Rockhampton Botanic Gardens attributed Lee with making the city "park conscious". Realising the potential of making Mount Archer accessible to the general public for recreational use, Lee officially opened the very first walking trail from Frenchville to the summit on 27 September 1932. One of Lee's successors Rex Pilbeam later furthered Lee's initial vision by lobbying hard for the construction of the long-desired road which could take vehicles up to the summit, which was officially opened by Queensland premier Frank Nicklin in 1965. However, walking from the base of Mount Archer to the summit continues to be a popular recreational activity and the first new dedicated footpath alongside part of Pilbeam Drive were officially opened in 2017.

Wanting to improve Rockhampton's sanitation, Lee oversaw the initial conception of the city's first sewerage infrastructure, the first plans of which were first adopted by council in 1934.

Healthcare was also advancing with Lee being present when Queensland home secretary Jens Petersen officially opened the new maternity ward at the Rockhampton General Hospital. Lee praised all those who had worked to establish the new maternity wing and said he was sure the district would be very proud of the accomplishment.

Lee successfully sought a second term as mayor in 1933 when was re-elected as mayor at the local government elections on 8 April 1933, beating his rivals Robert Cousins, David Dawson and Thomas Dunlop, the latter of which had served three years in the Queensland Parliament as the state MP for Rockhampton.

However, his desire for a third term as mayor went unfulfilled when he was defeated by Robert William Evans at the local government elections held on 20 April 1936. Lee openly expressed his disappointment at being defeated but said he had no regrets regarding anything he had done as mayor and said he believed he had not made any enemies during his nine years at council.

Lee delivered his final remarks as mayor at his final council meeting on 29 April 1936.

Following his defeat, Lee re-applied to return to the railways but ultimately took over a Golden Casket agency and hairdressing business in the CBD.

== Legacy ==
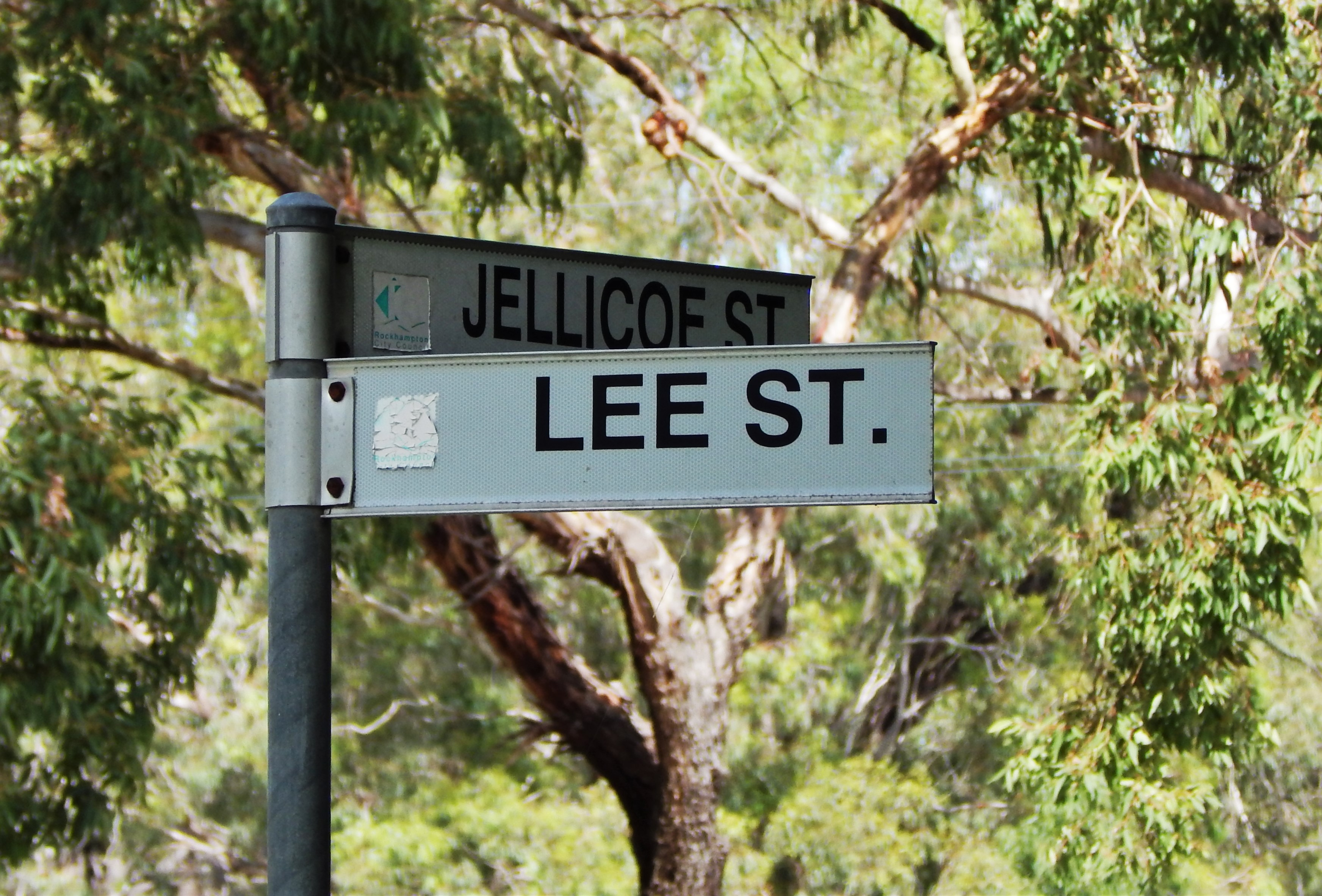
Lee Street in Port Curtis, 2022

A photograph of Lee was received by Rockhampton City Council in 1936 and hung in the mayor's room of the council chambers.

A street in the Rockhampton suburb of Port Curtis was named Lee Street in the former mayor's honour.

As a surviving former mayor in 1954, Lee attended the official ceremony to welcome Queen Elizabeth II and Prince Philip as they paid Rockhampton a brief visit. Lee was joined by other former mayors including Thomas Dunlop, Robert William Evans, Henry Jeffries and John Edgar.

== Personal life ==
Lee married Cecilia Agnes Josephine Elliot on 27 October 1913.

Lee died on 9 July 1969, three months after his wife Cecilia who had died on 7 April 1969. They were both buried in the North Rockhampton Cemetery.
