= John Palmer (mayor) =

Australian businessman and politician

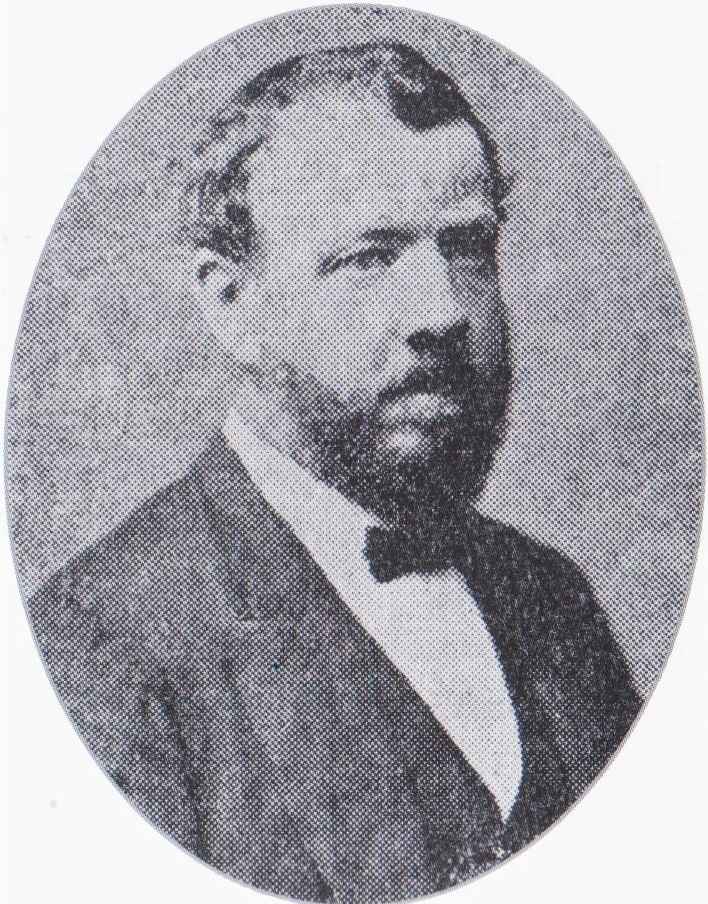
- Born: 12 June 1825; Birr, County Offaly, Ireland
- Died: 24 November 1870 (aged 45); Rockhampton, Queensland, Australia
- Burial place: South Rockhampton Cemetery
- Occupations: Businessman, politician
- Known for: Elected first mayor of Rockhampton; owned one of the first businesses in Rockhampton
- Relatives: Henry Palmer (brother)

Mayor of Rockhampton
- In office 1861–1862

John Palmer (12 June 1825 – 24 November 1870) was an Australian businessman and politician.

He is most notable for being the first mayor of the regional Australian city of Rockhampton.

== Background ==
Palmer was born in the Irish town of Birr in 1825, the youngest of ten children. He departed Plymouth, England on 24 November 1840, sailing to Australia and arriving on 11 March 1841.

In 1856, his brother Richard Palmer established the first general merchant store in Rockhampton, Queensland. The building, constructed of sawn timber, was built on the riverbank at the bottom end of Fitzroy Street diagonally opposite the original Bush Inn. The site is now occupied with the southern span of the Fitzroy Bridge, which was constructed prior to the bridge opening in 1952. Palmer's store and the Bush Inn were the first two dwellings in what is now the city centre.

John Palmer then took over the business in 1856, around the time of the gold rush at Canoona, north-west of Rockhampton, when business activities in Rockhampton increased dramatically.

In August 1860, a petition was created to lobby the Queensland Government to proclaim Rockhampton as a municipality, with Palmer being one of the many signatories. On 15 December 1860, Rockhampton was declared as Queensland's fourth municipality.

The first aldermen of the Rockhampton Municipal Council were elected on 26 February 1861 after voting took place by ballot. The men were all sworn in on 20 March 1861, with John Palmer being sworn in as the inaugural mayor.

Palmer only served in the position for eleven months before resigned due to his business interests often taking him away from Rockhampton. However, he served on the council for several more years as an alderman.

Throughout his public service, Palmer was known for his advocacy of education. He was one of several community leaders to push for the establishment of the Rockhampton School of Arts. When a meeting was held on 23 July 1861 at the Rockhampton courthouse, Palmer was elected to the preliminary School of Arts committee which was formed to advocate for such a facility. In January 1862, Palmer was appointed to the official committee, alongside the likes of other Rockhampton identities of the time such as Anthelme Thozet and Albrecht Feez.

== Personal life and death ==
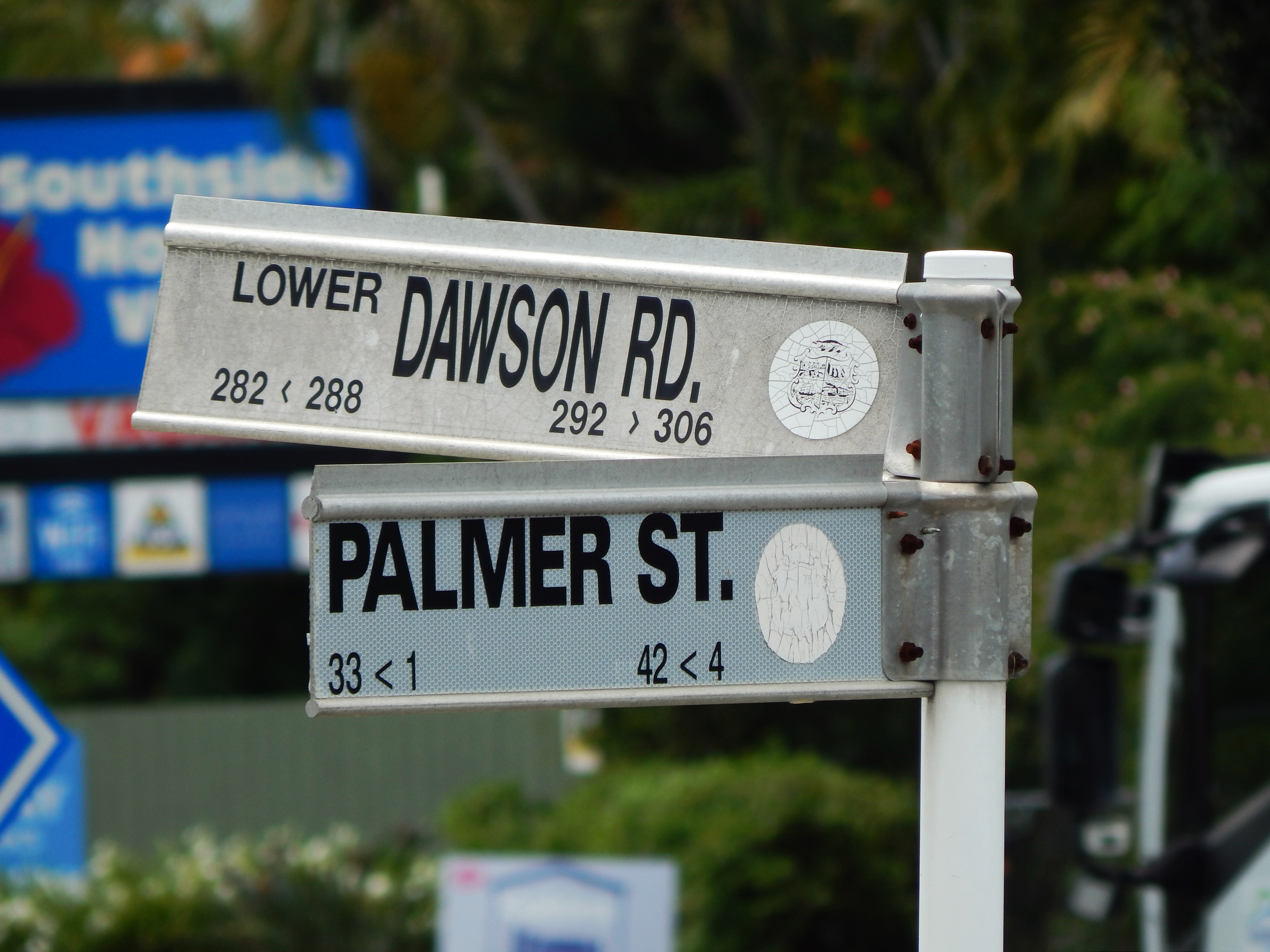
Sign at Palmer Street in the suburb of Allenstown, which was named in honour of John Palmer

Palmer was a younger brother to Henry Palmer, who was elected as the first mayor of Maryborough in 1861 before entering state politics, serving as the Member for Maryborough in the Queensland Parliament from 1880 to 1883.

John Palmer married Janet Ewan in Sydney on 27 September 1860 before returning to Rockhampton where they subsequently raised five children. With Palmer's election as mayor in 1861, Janet Palmer became Rockhampton's first "mayoress".

After battling illness for about two weeks, Palmer died on 4 September 1870. According to newspaper reports, Palmer's cause of death was remittent relapsing fever.

He was described in an editorial in The Rockhampton Bulletin and Central Queensland Advertiser as "a man of sterling integrity", with the newspaper also eulogising that Palmer had "always shown a warm interest in all movements calculated to promote the well-being of the town."

Palmer's funeral was held on 5 September 1870. It was reported that Palmer's funeral was "unusually large" which included a procession of thirty vehicles "of every description" and about 250 horsemen. He was buried in the South Rockhampton Cemetery.

After Palmer died, his wife Janet remarried to Richard Josias Robinson on 24 June 1873 in Sydney. Robinson had taken over Palmer's business following his Palmer's death. However, Robinson died less than seven months later on 14 January 1874. Janet remarried a third time just over a year later to Rockhampton health officer Dr. David Salmond on 27 March 1875, to whom she had two more children with. After 15 years of marriage, Salmond died in Sydney at the age of 67 on 10 April 1890, making Janet a widow for a third time. Janet Salmond died at the age of 86 on 28 July 1923 at her home at Wentworth Falls in New South Wales. Her funeral was held on 30 July 1923 and she was buried in the cemetery at Rookwood.

== Legacy ==
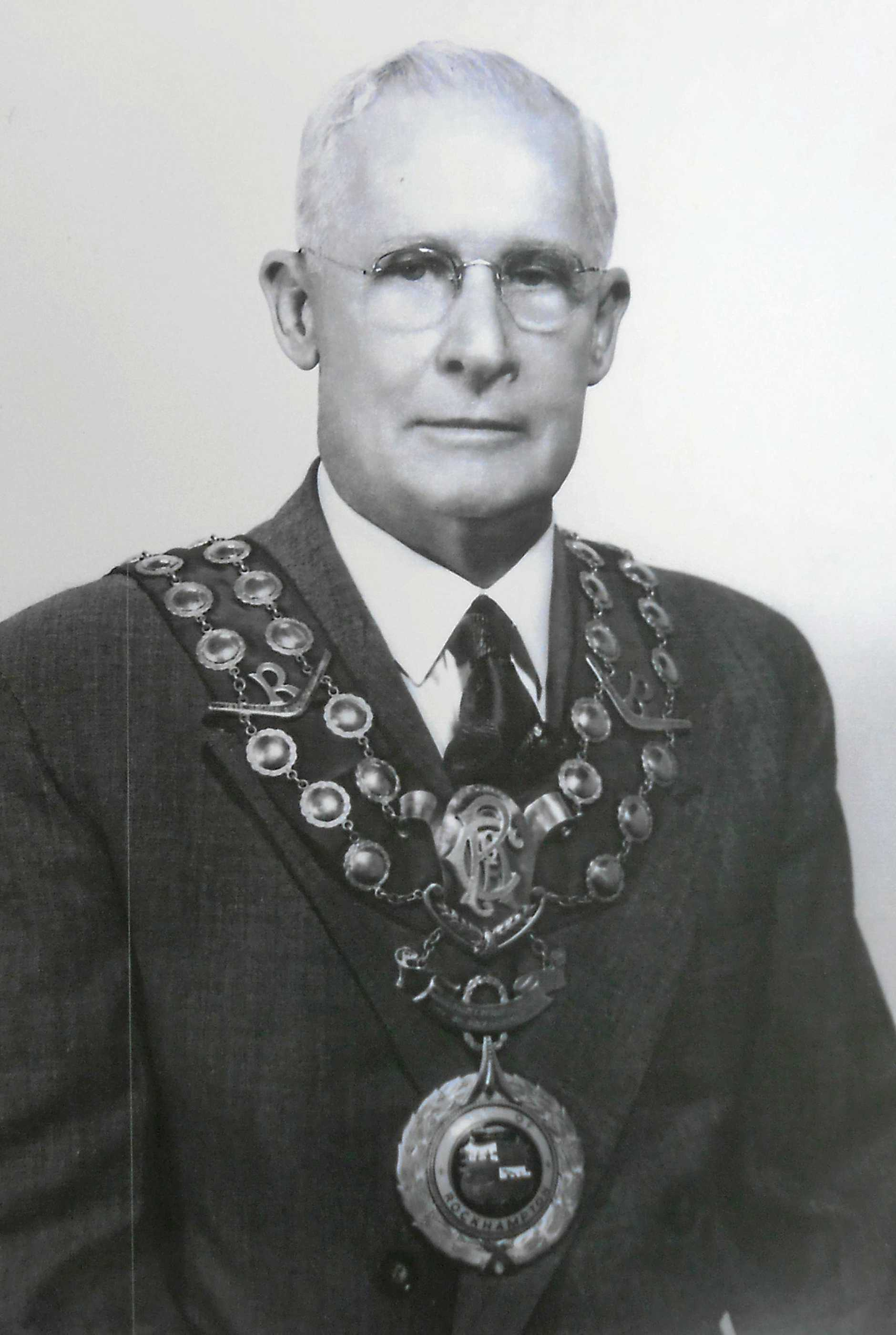
Rockhampton mayor Henry Jeffries in 1952 wearing the gold mayoral chain which has the names of all former Rockhampton mayors inscribed on it, starting with John Palmer

Palmer Street in the Rockhampton suburb of Allenstown was named in honour of John Palmer.

Palmer's name is one of the names inscribed on the gold mayoral chain presented to Rockhampton City Council by Alderman Frederick William Harrap in 1952. The chain, consisting of a double row of medallions, bears the name of all the mayors of Rockhampton since Palmer became the first in 1861. After it was presented to outgoing mayor Henry Jeffries, Jeffries only had one opportunity to wear it at a formal occasion when he hosted a civic reception for Queensland premier and former Rockhampton local Vince Gair. Jeffries' successor Rex Pilbeam continued wearing the chain on formal occasions such as the opening of the new bridge in 1952 and Queen Elizabeth II's visit in 1954.

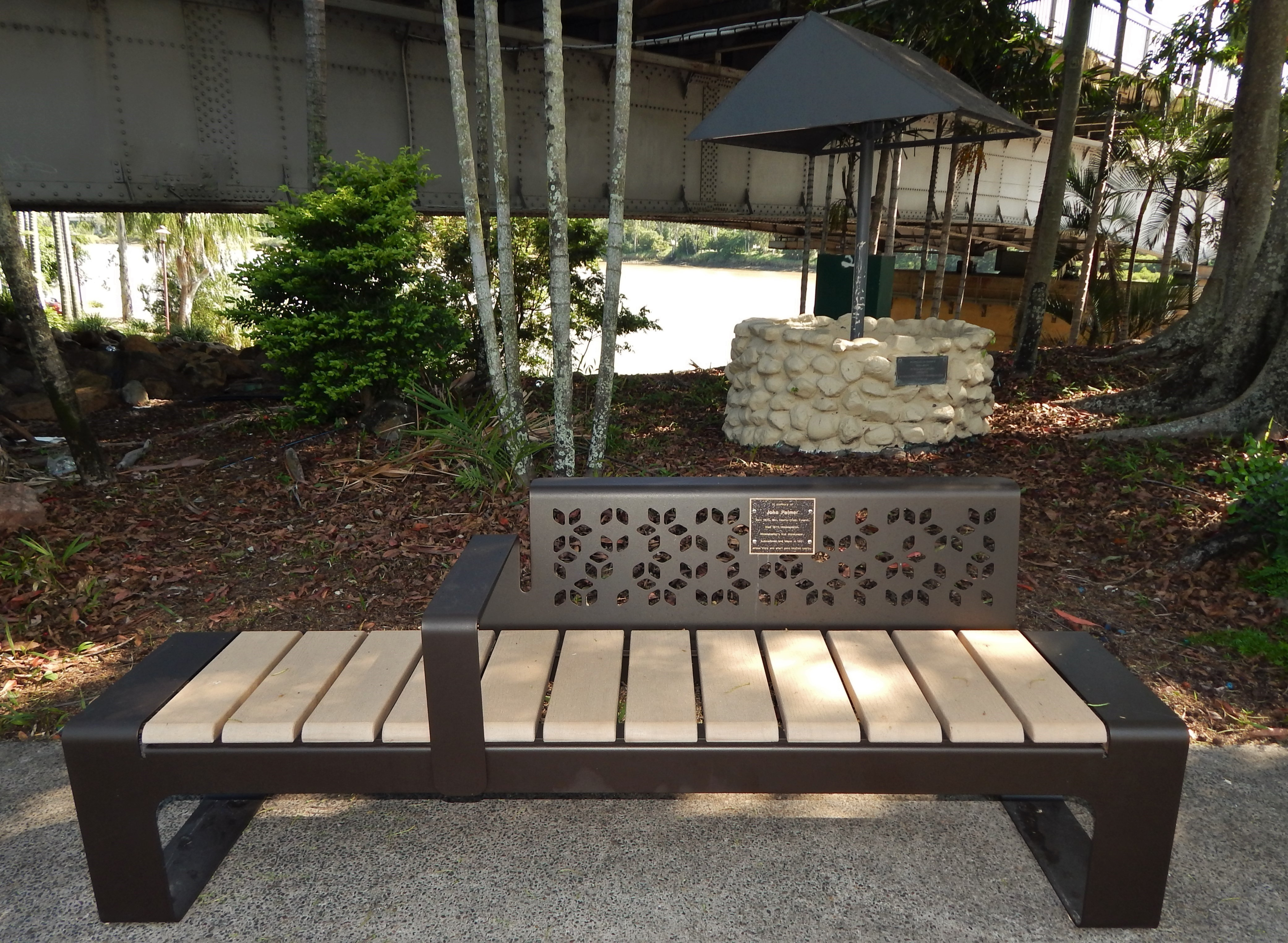
John Palmer's memorial bench in Rockhampton's riverside CBD, 2023

In 2023, a memorial bench and commemorative plaque were officially unveiled in Quay Street by current Rockhampton mayor Tony Williams, who said it was a fitting way to start Rockhampton Regional Council's new memorial and parks policy.

The plaque was unveiled close to the site where Palmer's store had been located, diagonally opposite The Criterion Hotel, with the unveiling attended by some of Palmer's descendants.

Palmer's great-grandson Andrew Palmer said he was pleased that Rockhampton Regional Council had finally recognised his great-grandfather's contribution, stating: "We've always felt he made a great contribution to the city and there was no real recognition of that, so we were very keen to see something the council recognised was an appropriate way to recognise his contributions as the first mayor and also a successful businessman."

Andrew Palmer said the family considered the seat for its practical applications as well as an appropriate way to honour his great-grandfather, stating: "We thought the seat was practical for people wanting to rest along Quay Street and observe the historical buildings and the Fitzroy River. I think he was sure the town had a real future, so he would be delighted to see what's happening in Rockhampton. He would be proud that the place where he had a role in starting has grown into the city it is today."

At the unveiling, Williams said he shared a common interest with Palmer in that they both wanted to see the city succeed.
