= Electoral results for the district of Rockhampton South =

Queensland, Australia, district election results

This is a list of electoral results for the electoral district of Rockhampton South in Queensland state elections.

== Members for Rockhampton South ==
Member	Party	Term
Rex Pilbeam	Liberal	1960–1969
Keith Wright	Labor	1969–1972

== Election results ==
=== Elections in the 1960s ===
1969 Queensland state election: Rockhampton South
Party	Candidate	Votes	%	±%
Labor	Keith Wright	5,948	50.9	+11.8
Liberal	Rex Pilbeam	4,778	40.8	−8.0
Queensland Labor	Peter Boyle	971	8.3	−3.8
Total formal votes		11,697	98.7	−0.1
Informal votes		150	1.3	+0.1
Turnout		11,847	92.7	−2.0
Two-party-preferred result
Labor	Keith Wright	6,101	52.2	+8.9
Liberal	Rex Pilbeam	5,596	47.8	−8.9
Labor gain from Liberal		Swing	+8.9	

1966 Queensland state election: Rockhampton South
Party	Candidate	Votes	%	±%
Liberal	Rex Pilbeam	5,873	48.8	+1.4
Labor	Kevin Charles	4,709	39.1	−3.8
Queensland Labor	Peter Boyle	1,456	12.1	+3.1
Total formal votes		12,038	98.8	+0.2
Informal votes		143	1.2	−0.2
Turnout		12,181	94.7	−1.1
Two-party-preferred result
Liberal	Rex Pilbeam	6,828	56.7	+2.0
Labor	Kevin Charles	5,210	43.3	−2.0
Liberal hold		Swing	+2.0	

1963 Queensland state election: Rockhampton South
Party	Candidate	Votes	%	±%
Liberal	Rex Pilbeam	5,728	47.4	+6.3
Labor	Charles White	5,179	42.9	+15.0
Queensland Labor	Stan Doolan	1,070	8.9	−22.1
Independent	Brian Dillon	93	0.8	+0.8
Total formal votes		12,070	98.6	−0.5
Informal votes		166	1.4	+0.5
Turnout		12,236	95.8	+2.1
Two-party-preferred result
Liberal	Rex Pilbeam	6,607	54.7	
Labor	Charles White	5,463	45.3	
Liberal hold		Swing	N/A	

1960 Queensland state election: Rockhampton South
Party	Candidate	Votes	%	±%
Liberal	Rex Pilbeam	5,047	41.1	
Queensland Labor	Mick Gardner	3,801	31.0	
Labor	Jim Clark	3,427	27.9	
Total formal votes		12,275	99.1	
Informal votes		106	0.9	
Turnout		12,381	93.7	
Liberal win		(new seat)		
