= Robert William Evans =

Australian politician

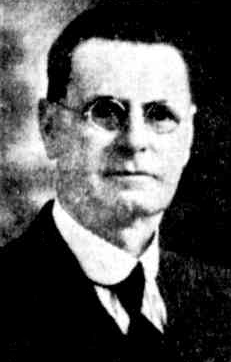
Robert William Evans, mayor of Rockhampton from 1936 to 1943

Robert William Evans (24 July 1872 – 11 June 1955) was an Australian politician, businessman, community leader and music advocate, best known for serving two terms as mayor of Rockhampton, Queensland from 1936 until 1943.

== Early life ==
Evans was born in Swansea, Wales in 1872. After his father Robert died, his mother Esther relocated the family to Australia in 1874. After arriving in Australia, the family settled in Far North Queensland, where Esther was employed as a governess for her brother's children on "Fairview Station" near Cooktown.

Evans found employment, working for hardware merchants in Cairns, Cooktown and Thursday Island.

At the age of 21, Evans founded an ironworks business and he and his mother relocated to Rockhampton, Queensland in 1895. After arriving in Rockhampton, Evans sold his machinery to an ironmonger.

In Rockhampton, Evans pursued various employment opportunities. He sold insurance at the National Life Assurance Company for seven years before he attempted to begin a money lending and broking business. For a time, Evans worked at local Rockhampton newspaper, the Daily Record, where he was employed in the circulation and advertising departments while also occasionally undertaking some reporting duties.

In 1908, Evans established his most successful business venture - the Evans Parcels Delivery Company, a local parcel delivery service which continued operating in Rockhampton until the 1950s.

== Community service ==
After Evans settled in Rockhampton, he became heavily involved in the city's many community organisations, particularly local music groups. He served as president of the Rockhampton City Band, vice president of the Rockhampton Musical Union, controller of the Rockhampton Junior Band and the Learner's Band and president of the Rockhampton Comic Opera Company.

Evans is credited with establishing the Rockhampton Eisteddfod Association, a legacy which continues to this day, with the annual Rockhampton Eisteddfod continuing to be held each year in the city. Following Evans' election as president of the association, the first annual Rockhampton Eisteddfod was held on 11 September 1923. Despite poor public support for the inaugural event, the association persisted by holding the event again the following year. In his opening address at the second event, Evans said that "rapid strides" had been made throughout the previous twelve months and despite the city being "very far behind" musically, he had hopes that in the future Rockhampton would be a city "to be reckoned with" in terms of its musical talent. The event grow in popularity rapidly, so much so that 200 people had to be turned away from the event in 1946.

Evans' musical interest originated during his younger years living in Cooktown, where he played cornet at the age of 15 in the Cooktown Brass Band before becoming a cello player. As a cellist in Rockhampton, Evans played in Woods' Orchestra and Herr D'Hage's Orpheus Club.

Evans was also involved with the Rockhampton Agricultural Society, the Social Services League, the Automobile Association of Central Queensland, the Rockhampton Chamber of Commerce and the Society for the Prevention of Cruelty.

== Politics ==
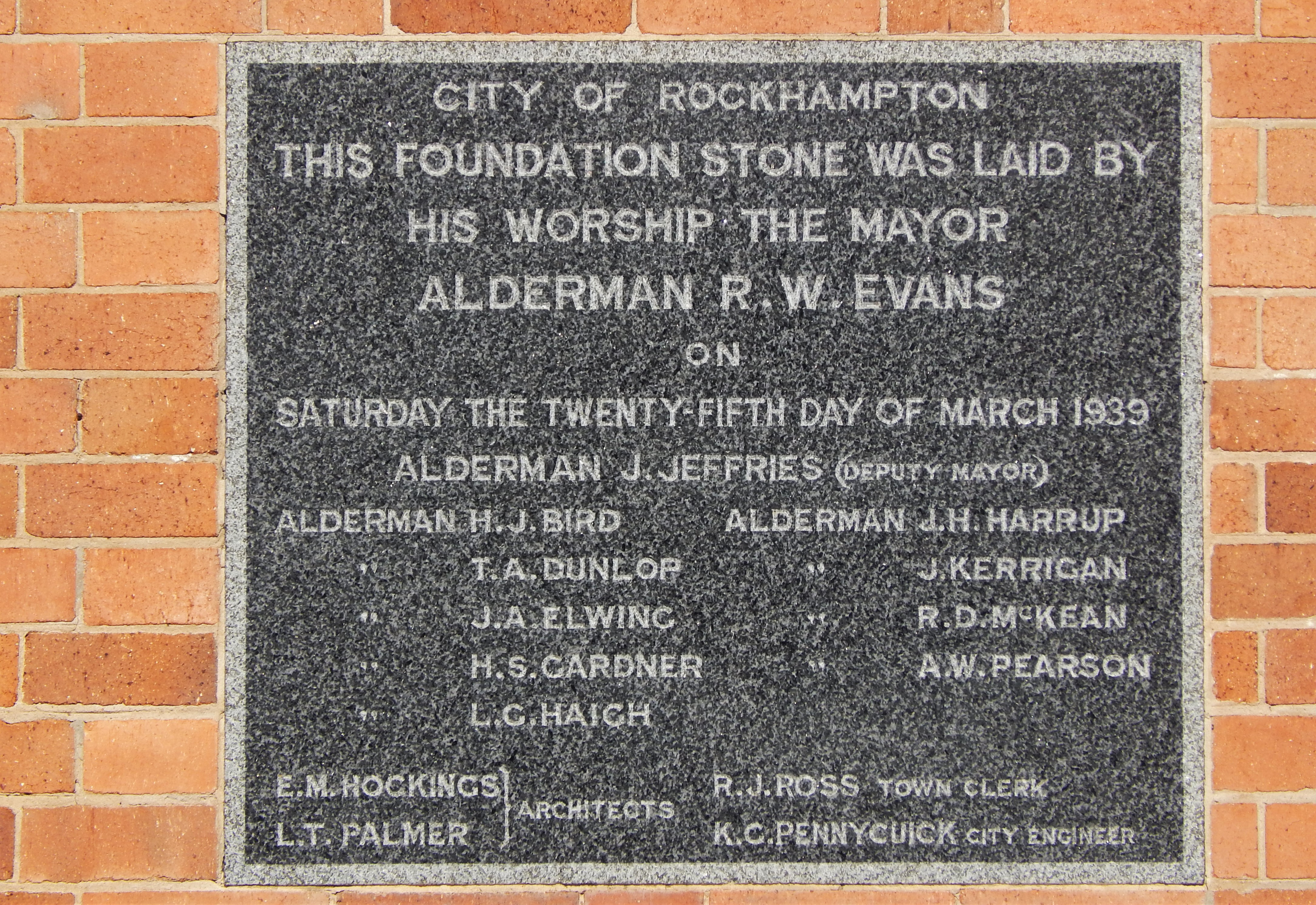
Robert William Evans laid the foundation stone at the site of the Rockhampton Town Hall in 1939

Evans first entered local politics when he was elected as an alderman at the local Rockhampton City Council elections in 1933 where, according to the local press, he polled "surprisingly well" in the field of 28 candidates who were all vying to fill one of the 10 vacancies on the council.

After serving one term as an alderman, Evans was nominated for the position of mayor at the 1936 elections. He was elected as mayor on 18 April 1936 beating his opponents, incumbent mayor Thomas Joseph Lee and Charles Adam Hoffman.

Despite the challenges of being a wartime mayor, Evans' desire to modernise the city with new infrastructure resulted in him accomplishing a number of considerable achievements for Rockhampton.

Keen to see a sewerage system installed in the city, Evans successfully launched the council's sewerage scheme by turning the first sod at the site where work commenced in 1936.

Evans made a concerted effort to seal the streets of Rockhampton with bitumen, securing substantial loans to make it happen. This was met with some opposition with cattlemen raising concerns about cattle and horses slipping on the new bitumen as they herded mobs of cattle from Victoria Parade onto the Fitzroy Bridge.

In 1939, Evans successfully updated the city's public transport network by replacing Rockhampton's ageing steam trams with a fleet of diesel buses. As a newly elected alderman, Evans had previously been quick to express his desire to see the trams superseded by buses. After running for thirty years, the final steam tram ran on 24 June 1939.

Also in 1939, Evans turned the first sod at the site of Rockhampton's new town hall. As mayor, Evans watched on as Queensland Premier William Forgan Smith officially opened the building on 24 May 1941.

Throughout his time in local government, Evans worked hard to ensure women had access to various amenities, such as public toilets and air raid trenches.

He also used speeches at annual Country Women's Association meetings to encourage women to enter politics. In 1936, Evans said that there were many matters that be believed would be "handled much better by women than men", and in 1940, he encouraged the organisation to nominate one of their members to run as a candidate for Federal Parliament.

Evans was successfully reelected as mayor at the 1939 election. After serving a total of two terms, Evans was beaten by Henry Jeffries at the 1943 election.

As mayor, Evans was committed to the position, even leaving his hospital bed in 1938 for a council meeting following an operation, before returning to hospital afterwards to continue his recovery.

He was also quick to defend Rockhampton, publicly chastising geologist Robert John Tillyard for his controversial "papaw comments" about the city in 1936. Evans described Tillyard's comments as "vulgar" and "very stupid, ill-timed and on a subject with which he is not familiar".

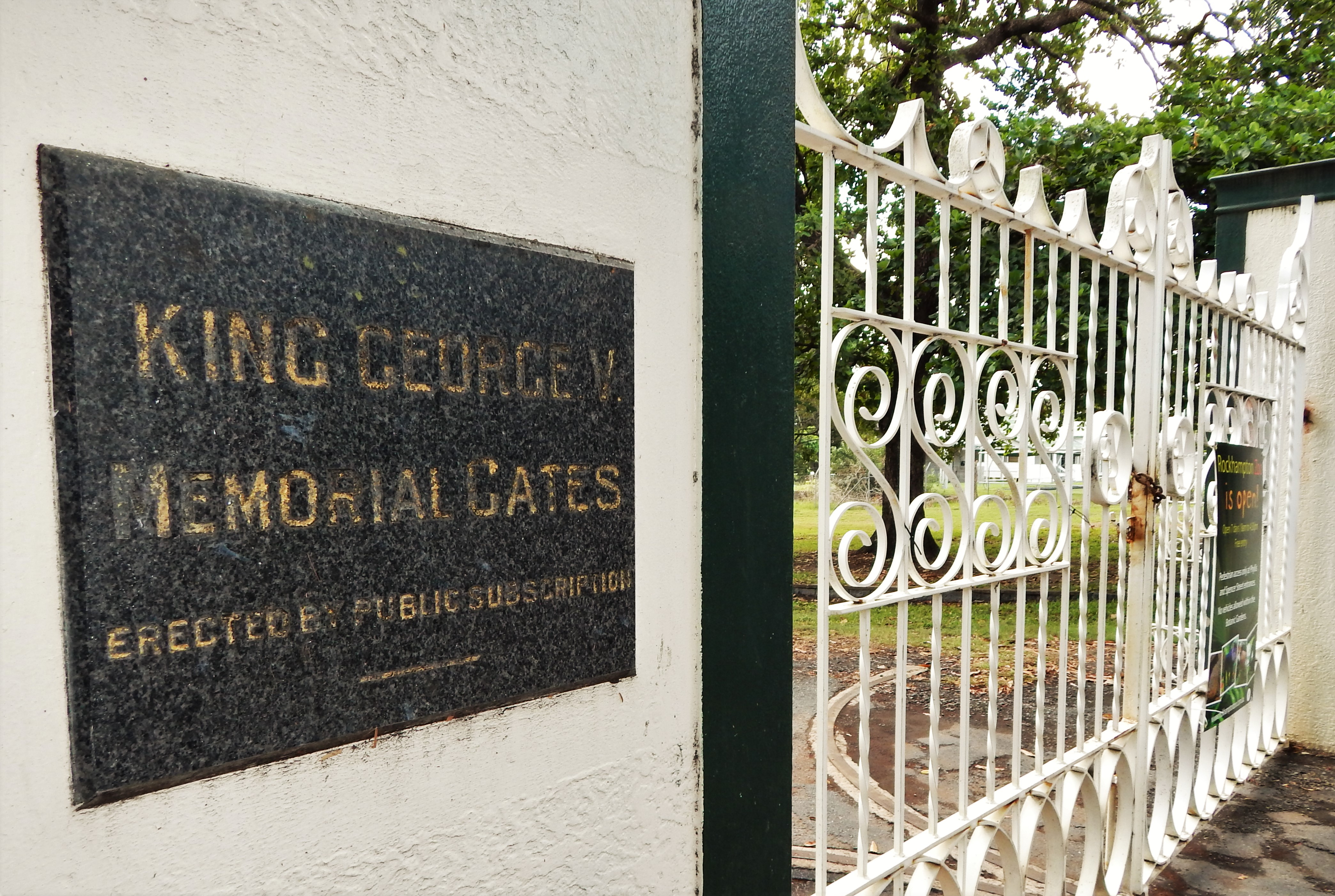
The King George V memorial gates at the Rockhampton Botanic Gardens were opened by Evans in 1953

Evans travelled extensively, particularly internationally, and was always interested in how other municipalities across the world met their challenges.

Evans again attempted to be elected onto the council as an alderman in 1946 but was unsuccessful.

In 1953, Evans was invited to perform the honour of unlocking the new King George V memorial gates at the Rockhampton Botanic Gardens on 31 May 1953. Evans had been a chairman of a memorial fund committee which was established to consider an appropriate memorial to King George V who had died shortly before Evans became mayor in 1936.

Evans was one of five surviving former Rockhampton mayors present when Queen Elizabeth II visited the city in 1954.

Evans died on 11 June 1955.

== See also ==
- Henry Jeffries
- Rex Pilbeam
