= Roffey (disambiguation) =

Roffey is a suburb of Horsham in the south of England.

Roffey may also refer to:

- Roffey (electoral division) in Horsham, England
- Roffey, Yonne, a commune in north-central France
- Frederick Roffey (1895–unknown), Welsh rugby player
- Bill Roffey (1954– ), English footballer
- Monique Roffey (1965– ), writer
- Sue Roffey, British and Australian psychologist and academic
- Victor Roffey, (1908–1993), Australian aviator
