= North Rockhampton Borough Chambers =

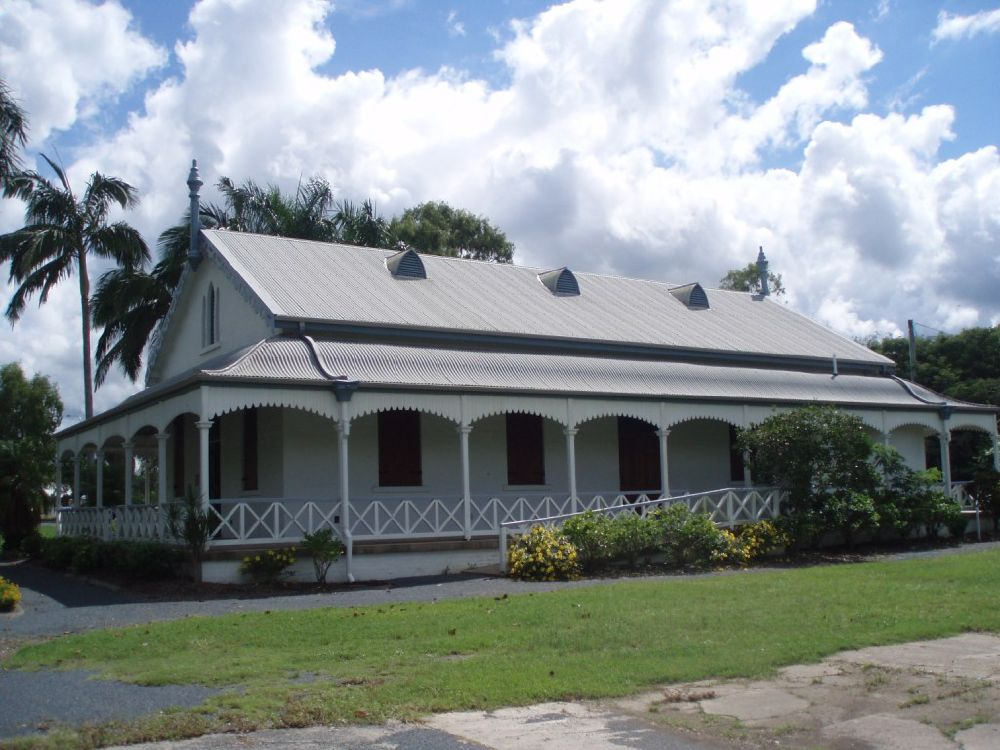
- North Rockhampton Borough Chambers, 2009

- Location within Queensland Location within Australia
- 23.3731°S 150.5198°E
- Location: 20 Bridge Street, Berserker, Rockhampton, Rockhampton Region, Queensland, Australia

History
- Design period: 1870s–1890s (late 19th century)
- Built: 1885

Site notes
- Architect: John William Wilson

Queensland Heritage Register
- Official name: North Rockhampton Borough Chambers
- Type: state heritage (landscape, built)
- Designated: 27 September 2002
- Reference no.: 601370
- Significant period: 1885–1919 (historical); 1885–ongoing (social)
- Significant components: trees/plantings, roof/ridge ventilator/s / fleche/s, council chamber/meeting room, views to
- Builders: Messrs Burton and Smith

North Rockhampton Borough Chambers is a heritage-listed former town hall at 20 Bridge Street, Berserker, Rockhampton, Rockhampton Region, Queensland, Australia. It was designed by John William Wilson and built in 1885 by Messrs Burton and Smith. It was added to the Queensland Heritage Register on 27 September 2002.

== History ==
The North Rockhampton Borough Chambers was constructed in 1885 by Messrs Burton and Smith to a design by Rockhampton architect, JW Wilson. The borough council remained in the building until 1919 when the Town of North Rockhampton was absorbed into the Town of Rockhampton. Since 1919, the building has been used by a number of groups, and from 1985, has been the home of the Rockhampton and District Historical Society.

Rockhampton emerged as an important Queensland regional centre during the 1850s and 1860s. The Municipality of Rockhampton was proclaimed on 15 December 1860. Rockhampton's development took on a greater prominence after the discovery of the mining wealth at Mount Morgan in 1882.

Rockhampton's first neighbour in local government was the Gogango Divisional Board which was proclaimed by Order-in-Council in 1879. It completely surrounded the Municipality of Rockhampton and included North Rockhampton. The Borough of North Rockhampton, with a population of less than 1700, was established in 1883, only two years after the opening of the first bridge across the Fitzroy River. Its thirty-six year existence was often difficult and unhappy. The borough had only a small population and its location across the river from the stronger and wealthier Rockhampton Municipality made negative comparisons inevitable and the development of its own identity almost impossible. Even at the end of its independent existence in 1919, it was described as a "small and straggling hamlet".

From the beginning great pressure appears to have been placed on the Mayors of the Council who were at loggerheads with their own councillors. In the last years of the borough's existence, bitter letters of complaint to the Home Secretary or petitions demanding the removal of mayors and councillors went to Brisbane on a number of occasions.

The first meeting of resident landowners at North Rockhampton to receive nominations for councillors was held at the Forester's Hall in October 1883 and the first council met in early December to fulfil initial civic commitments, though according to The Morning Bulletin, not in a "very expeditious way". It was further commented in The Morning Bulletin that councillors should attend some meetings of the Rockhampton Municipality to learn procedure. The first mayor of the North Rockhampton Borough Council was William Hopkins. In February 1884, however, he was replaced by the newly elected, John William Face.

The borough's most pressing, and recurring problem was how to obtain a good water supply and the first three suggestions were a well, a pump near Kalka Creek and a dam in the Berserker Range. The council opted for a well in Kalka Creek near the foot of the Berserker Ranges and a pump to draw the water. The borough was still trying to raise funds for a dam in the Ranges when it became part of Greater Rockhampton in 1919. Besides the water issue, the borough was concerned that, with the altering of divisional boundaries, it might lose the Lakes Creek area. Again, The Morning Bulletin saw fit to provide advice to borough by suggesting that the "infant community" should consider what an undue influence the Meat Preserving Company would have on its affairs, and thought that the borough would be better off without it. This is interesting as, it is likely that the municipality would have been strengthened by the establishment and continued presence of large industry.

In 1884, new plans for a tramway were put forward when the Rockhampton and Northside Tramway Company pushed ahead with plans for construction. In early 1885 however, Railway Engineer, Robert Ballard, criticised the council for the dangerous state of the main thoroughfare (Yaamba Road) torn up for the tramway. By March 1885, it was apparent that a tramway north or south of the river would not be completed.

Despite these difficulties, the North Rockhampton Borough Council obtained a loan to construct a purpose-built council building. The building was designed by John William Wilson and constructed by Messrs Burton and Smith at a cost of £1,346.

JW Wilson (1829–1915) was born in Banff, Scotland and emigrated to Australia c. 1854, working in Ballarat as a foreman for the Victorian Works Department. After moving to Rockhampton in c. 1864, Wilson worked as a builder and carrier until November 1874 when he began practice as an architect and surveyor, filling a void left by AW Voysey's appointment to the railways. Wilson was seen as a practical architect and dominated the profession in Rockhampton until the 1890s.

The Northern Daily Argus on 17 December 1885, reported that the North Rockhampton Municipal Chambers were rapidly approaching completion. The Argus advised that on entering the interior, the first object that meets the eye was the substantial strong room situated in the south-east corner of the hall, built of brick in cement and plastered over with three quarters cement. Messrs Wiley, Holmes and Company supplied the four large cedar folding doors as well as the four, circular, wooden ventilators in the ceiling. By December 1885, partitions for four offices were in the course of assembly and the verandahs surrounding the premises were being covered by the plumbers with curved galvanised iron (described in the newspaper as O.G. sheeting).

The North Rockhampton Borough Chambers survived the 1880s without too many crises or achievements; however, in 1890, the Town Clerk was arrested for embezzlement. Relationships between the borough and the Gogango Divisional Board became an issue once again in 1893 concerning the issue of the two main roads north of Rockhampton: the Yaamba Road and the Black Ball Flats (now Norman Road). Letters of complaint and accusation were passed between the two local authorities and the Colonial Secretary. Maintenance of the roads were key issues.

Throughout the first decade of the 20th century, the North Rockhampton Borough Council was beset by other problems, including the entry of Labor politicians into the Council which alarmed the anti-socialist sector; personal accusations from one councillor to another, in one instance, a councillor claiming that one of the candidates for council was a "traitor" and another councillor claiming that his questions to council had not been recorded in the minutes of the meeting.

A major change occurred in council structure and administration shortly after the First World War - the establishment of the Greater Rockhampton Scheme. When in 1918, the North Rockhampton Borough Council approached Queensland Treasurer, Ted Theodore, for a loan, he considered it unfortunate that the government should be asked to finance two water schemes of considerable dimensions for the one city. The two local authorities were requested to work together for the one scheme. This was not easy as proposals for Greater Rockhampton had been turned down on two earlier occasions either through apathy or "mere prejudice" and it seemed that if Rockhampton wanted modern amenities these deterrent factors must be overcome. In the end it was government pressure rather than local agreement which brought amalgamation about and, in March 1919, there were thirty-two nominations for the first enlarged council of eleven councillors.

Following the subsuming of the North Rockhampton Borough Council into the Greater Rockhampton Scheme, the Main Roads Board used the building as its offices from the 1920s to the 1960s, when it moved to new government offices in Bolsover Street. The Naval Cadets then made it their Headquarters before moving to another venue.

The Rockhampton City Council commenced restoration work on the building in 1984. Since 1985, the former North Rockhampton Borough Chambers has been the home of the Rockhampton and District Historical Society.

== Description ==
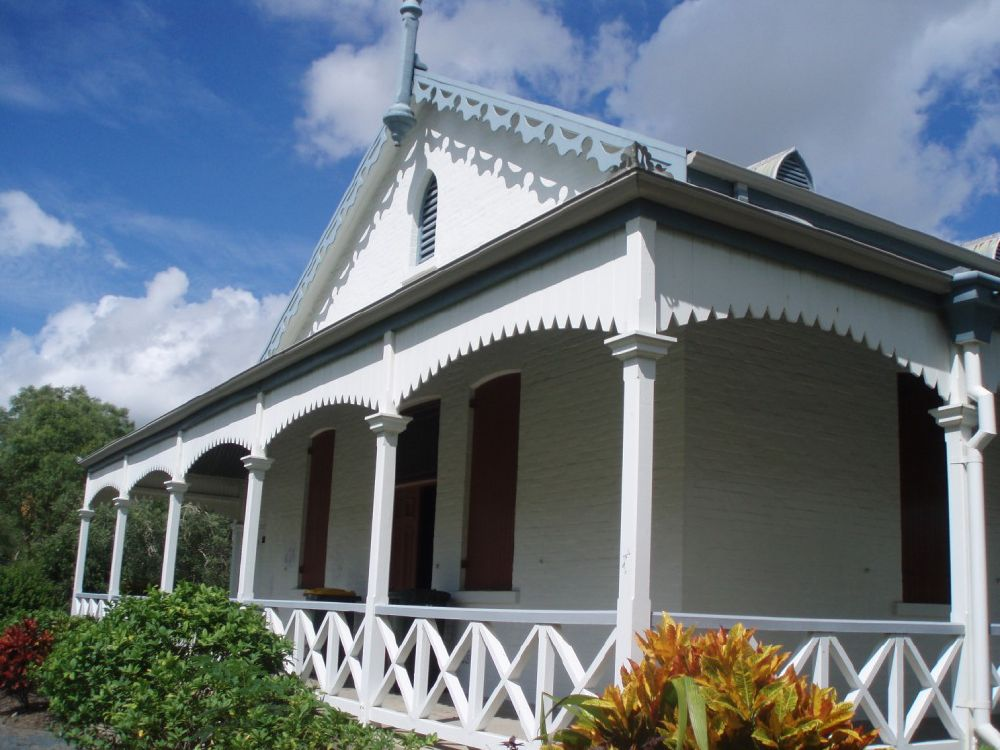
View from the north-east, 2009

Situated in Stapleton Park and accessed via Bridge Street, the former North Rockhampton Borough Chambers is a single storey brick building, painted white, with a gabled roof clad with corrugated galvanised iron, with ogee shaped verandah surrounding the building on four sides. The verandah has timber balustrading and chamfered timber posts with moulded capitals. The roof has three ventilators on the northern and southern sides of the building. Timber finials and decorative timber fretwork to the gable are located at the western and eastern ends of the building.

The western elevation, the main entrance to the building, has three pointed arch windows with timber louvres in the upper section. Similarly, the eastern elevation has a single pointed arch window with timber louvres.

All four elevations have paired, timber doors with breezeways. Two timber framed, sash windows with timber shutters are located in the western and eastern elevations and four of the same windows are located in the northern and southern elevations. Concrete ramp access is located in the southern side of the building. Modern kitchenette and toilet facilities are located along the verandah in the south-east corner of the building.

A garden is located in front of the north-western side of the building and some mature trees are located to the west of the building. Vacant land surrounds the building to its southern and north-eastern side. Directly to the north is located an asphalted area with street signs, traffic lights and marked lanes, designed to educate the user about road rules. A basketball court is located directly west of the building beyond the garden area. The Police Citizens Youth Club building is located on a separate block of land to the west of the basketball court area.

The bitumen court area and the bitumen road training facility are not part of the heritage listing.

== Heritage listing ==
North Rockhampton Borough Chambers was listed on the Queensland Heritage Register on 27 September 2002 having satisfied the following criteria.

The place is important in demonstrating the evolution or pattern of Queensland's history.

Constructed in 1885, for the North Rockhampton Borough Council, the former North Rockhampton Borough Chambers is significant as it demonstrates the development of the institute of local government in North Rockhampton. It is an extant reminder of the North Rockhampton Borough Council which was subsumed into the new council structure with the proclamation of the Greater Rockhampton area in 1919.

The place demonstrates rare, uncommon or endangered aspects of Queensland's cultural heritage.

The former North Rockhampton Borough Chambers is a rare surviving example of a purpose built council chambers from the 19th century which were a common feature of Queensland towns from this period.

The place is important in demonstrating the principal characteristics of a particular class of cultural places.

The former North Rockhampton Borough Chambers is significant for its association with prominent Rockhampton architect, JW Wilson, who designed a number of buildings in Rockhampton including the School of Arts, Bolsover Street; the former Harbour Board Building and the Bulletin Building both in Quay Street.

The place is important because of its aesthetic significance.

The former North Rockhampton Borough Chambers is significant as an example of a well composed local government building with a strong domestic influence. Located in Stapleton Park, the former North Rockhampton Borough Chambers makes a significant contribution to the landscape, and particularly for its contribution to the Bridge Street streetscape.

The place has a strong or special association with a particular community or cultural group for social, cultural or spiritual reasons.

The former North Rockhampton Borough Chambers has a special association with the people of North Rockhampton and continues to be a focal point for the community as the home of the Rockhampton and District Historical Society.
