= Town of North Rockhampton =

Local government area of Queensland, Australia

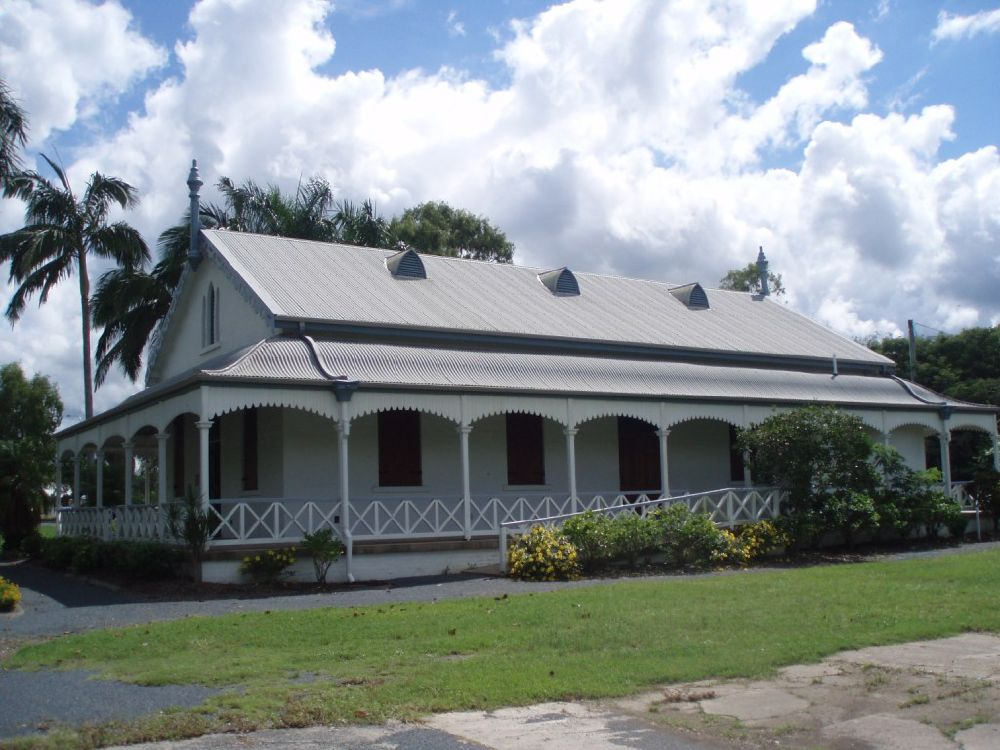
Former North Rockhampton Borough Chambers, 2009

The Town of North Rockhampton (formerly the Borough of North Rockhampton) was a local government area in Queensland, Australia. It existed from 1883 to 1919.

== History ==
The Borough of Rockhampton was proclaimed as Queensland's fourth municipality (after Borough of Brisbane, Borough of Ipswich and Borough of Toowoomba) on 13 December 1860 under the Municipalities Act 1858, a piece of New South Wales legislation inherited by Queensland when it became a separate colony in 1859. It held its first election on 26 February 1861 and its inaugural meeting on 1 March 1861. The municipality had an area of 13 km^{2} (5.0 sq mi) located on the south bank of the Fitzroy River and had a population of about 600. In 1864, the council was divided into three wards—Fitzroy, Archer and Leichhardt. It achieved a measure of autonomy in 1878 with the enactment of the Local Government Act.

On 11 November 1879, the Gogango Division was established as one of 74 divisions around Queensland under the Divisional Boards Act 1879. It covered an area of 16,239 km^{2} (6,270 sq mi) surrounding the municipality—an area significantly greater than the modern Rockhampton Region covers. Capital and people came to the area in greater numbers after the discovery of gold in 1882 at Mount Morgan, about 20 kilometres (12 mi) south of Rockhampton.

A bridge was built spanning the Fitzroy River in 1882, and a year later in September 1883, the Borough of North Rockhampton was proclaimed. North Rockhampton had a somewhat unhappy 36-year existence—its small population and location opposite the stronger and wealthier Rockhampton borough made comparisons inevitable and development of its own identity almost impossible. In 1919, it was described as a "small and straggling hamlet". Nevertheless, it was able to get a loan to construct a Municipal Chambers in 1885, which was completed in December of that year. The town clerk's arrest for embezzlement in 1890 marked the beginning of a period of difficulties characterised by disputes with the surrounding Gogango Divisional Board over road construction, and internal conflict between members of council, in which the Queensland Government was often requested to intervene. It did not have a reliable water supply and at the time of its amalgamation was still trying to raise funds for a dam.

With the passage of the Local Authorities Act 1902, Rockhampton became one of three former municipalities, alongside Brisbane and Townsville, to become a City on 31 March 1903, while North Rockhampton became the Town of North Rockhampton.

The State Government became concerned in 1918 after both the City of Rockhampton and Town of North Rockhampton councils proposed separate water infrastructure projects. On Saturday 25 January 1919, an amalgamation referendum held in North Rockhampton passed with 884 of the 1,029 votes cast in favour. On 15 March 1919, elections for the new four-ward council with 11 councillors took place, with their first meeting being held five days later.

The North Rockhampton borough chambers, located in Stapleton Park, North Rockhampton, became a Main Roads office for about four decades, and eventually was restored and, since 1985, has been the home of Rockhampton and District Historical Society. It was added to the Queensland Heritage Register on 27 September 2002.

== Mayors ==
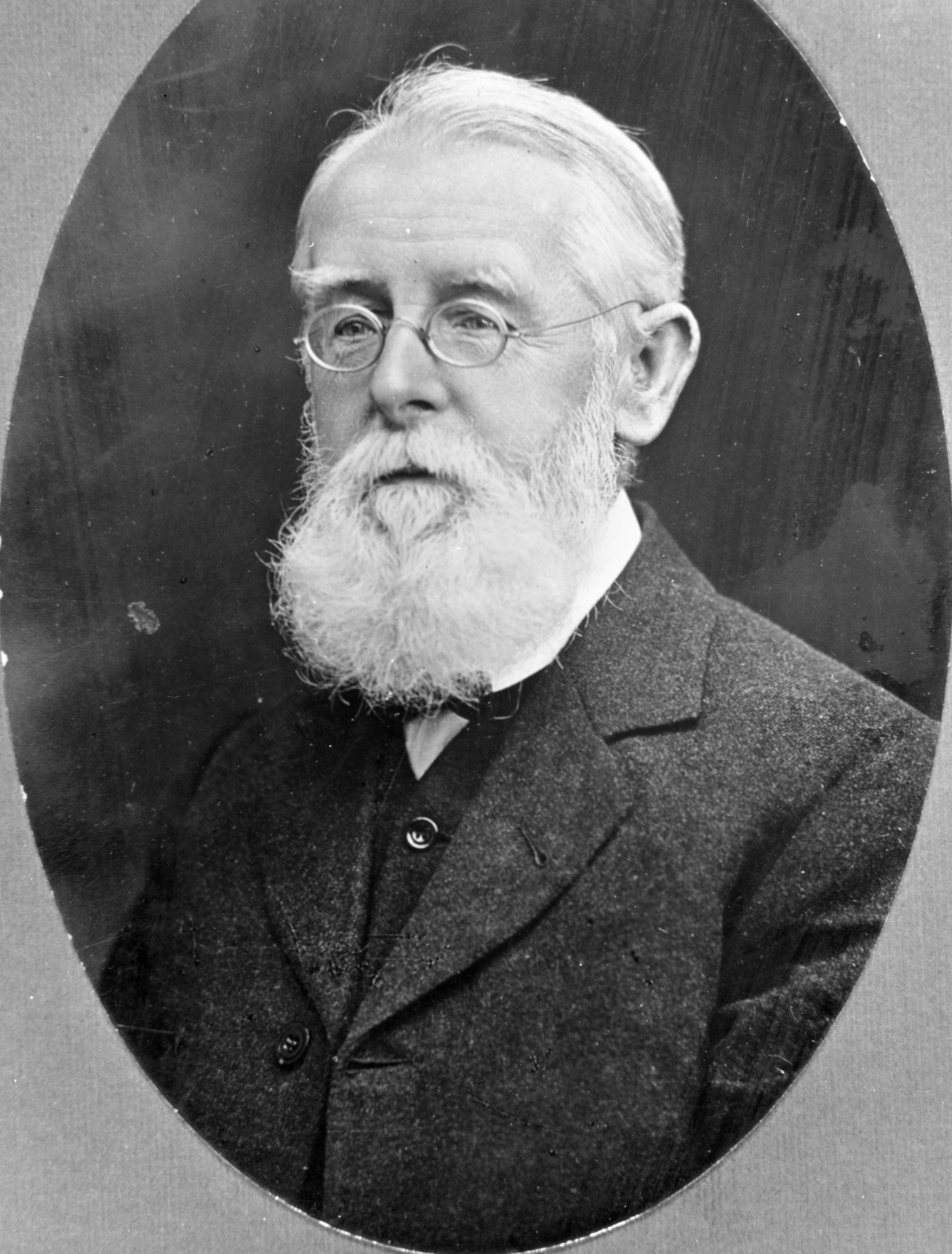
- William Hopkins, first mayor of North Rockhampton, 1883
  1883: William Hopkins
- 1884: John William Face
- 1885: John William Face
- 1886: John William Face
- 1887: John Wallis Rutter (NB: failed to serve full term due to his arrest in December 1887. Edwin Macaree was appointed interim mayor in January 1888 prior to the annual election of mayor)
- 1888: Edwin Macaree
- 1889: Edwin Macaree
- 1890: William George Thompson (later Senator for Queensland)
- 1891: Thomas Nobbs
- 1892: John Linnett
- 1893: John Linnett
- 1894: John Linnett
- 1895: Frank Power
- 1896: Frank Power
- 1897: Frank Power
- 1898: William Alexander Reaney
- 1899: William Alexander Reaney
- 1900: John Linnett
- 1901: Frederick Woods
- 1902: James Canovan
- 1903: Charles Oliver Gough
- 1904: John William Robinson
- 1905: James Canovan
- 1906: Edward Cureton Tomkins
- 1907: William Alexander Reaney
- 1908: Arthur Charles Underwood
- 1909: Robert Elliot Hartley
- 1910: Robert Elliot Hartley
- 1911: Cecil Robert Makepeace Thackeray
- 1912: Edward Thompson
- 1913: William Alexander Reaney
- 1914: Arthur Frederick Kent
- 1915: William Alexander Reaney
- 1916: Alfred John Bawden
- 1917: Martin Hogan
- 1918: Edward Stephen Face
