= City of Rockhampton =

- Local government area
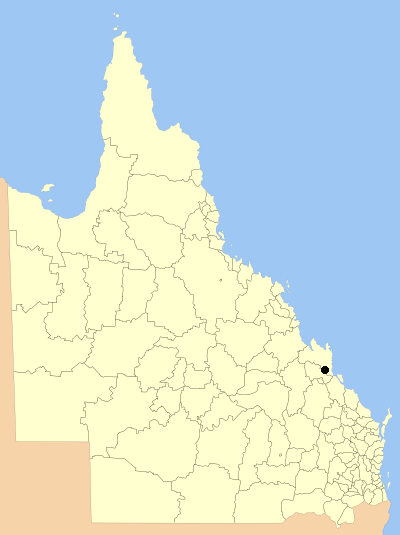
- Location within Queensland

- Country: Australia
- State: Queensland
- Region: Central Queensland
- Established: 1860
- Council seat: Rockhampton

Area
  - Total: 188.7 km^{2} (72.9 sq mi)

Population
  - Total: 59,943 (2006 census)
  - Density: 317.66/km^{2} (822.74/sq mi)
- Website: City of Rockhampton
LGAs around City of Rockhampton
Livingstone	Livingstone	Livingstone
Fitzroy	City of Rockhampton	Livingstone
Fitzroy	Fitzroy	Fitzroy

The City of Rockhampton was a local government area in the Central Queensland region of Queensland, Australia, encompassing most of the suburban area of the regional city of Rockhampton. The city covered an area of 188.7 square kilometres (72.9 sq mi), and has existed as a local government entity in various forms from 1860 until 2008, when it amalgamated with several other councils in the surrounding area to become the Rockhampton Region.

== History ==
The Borough of Rockhampton was proclaimed as Queensland's fourth municipality (after Borough of Brisbane, Borough of Ipswich and Borough of Toowoomba) on 13 December 1860 under the Municipalities Act 1858, a piece of New South Wales legislation inherited by Queensland when it became a separate colony in 1859. It held its first election on 26 February 1861 and its inaugural meeting on 1 March 1861. The municipality had an area of 13 km^{2} (5.0 sq mi) located on the south bank of the Fitzroy River and had a population of about 600. In 1864, the council was divided into three wards—Fitzroy, Archer and Leichhardt. A proposal to greatly expand its area southwards to include Gracemere and Bouldercombe was rejected in part due to opposition from influential squatters in the area. It achieved a measure of autonomy in 1878 with the enactment of the Local Government Act.

On 11 November 1879, the Gogango Division was established as one of 74 divisions around Queensland under the Divisional Boards Act 1879. It covered an area of 16,239 km^{2} (6,270 sq mi) surrounding the municipality—an area significantly greater than the modern Rockhampton Regional Council covers. Capital and people came to the area in greater numbers after the discovery of gold in 1882 at Mount Morgan, about 20 kilometres (12 mi) south of Rockhampton.

Fitzroy Bridge was built to span the Fitzroy River in 1882, and a year later in September 1883, the Borough of North Rockhampton was proclaimed. North Rockhampton had a somewhat unhappy 36-year existence—its small population and location opposite the stronger and wealthier Rockhampton borough made comparisons inevitable and development of its own identity almost impossible. In 1919, it was described as a "small and straggling hamlet". Nevertheless, it was able to get a loan to construct a Municipal Chambers in 1885, which was completed in December of that year. The town clerk's arrest for embezzlement in 1890 marked the beginning of a period of difficulties characterised by disputes with the surrounding Gogango Divisional Board over road construction, and internal conflict between members of council, in which the Queensland Government was often requested to intervene. It did not have a reliable water supply and at the time of its amalgamation was still trying to raise funds for a dam.

Although a foundation stone was laid for a town hall in 1897, it was not until 1941 that the Rockhampton Town Hall was completed.

With the passage of the Local Authorities Act 1902, Rockhampton became one of three former municipalities, alongside Brisbane and Townsville, to become a City on 31 March 1903, while North Rockhampton became the Town of North Rockhampton.

The State Government became concerned in 1918 after both the City of Rockhampton and Town of North Rockhampton councils proposed separate water infrastructure projects. On Saturday 25 January 1919, an amalgamation referendum held in North Rockhampton passed with 884 of the 1,029 votes cast in favour. On 15 March 1919, elections for the new four-ward council with 11 councillors took place, with their first meeting being held five days later. North Rockhampton Borough Chambers, located in Stapleton Park, Berserker, became a Main Roads office for about four decades, and eventually was restored and, since 1985, has been the home of Rockhampton and District Historical Society.

Wards were abolished at some point and were not reintroduced until 1982, when the council was restructured with 10 divisions each electing one councillor, plus a mayor elected by the entire city. On 1 July 1984, the City grew northwards by annexing Parkhurst, where its water treatment facility was being constructed, from the Shire of Livingstone. The council tried on several occasions to expand further into the Livingstone and Fitzroy areas, but a referendum in Fitzroy on 9 February 1991 was opposed by 83% of valid votes cast.

On 15 March 2008, under the Local Government (Reform Implementation) Act 2007 passed by the Parliament of Queensland on 10 August 2007, the City of Rockhampton merged with the Shires of Livingstone, Fitzroy and Mount Morgan to form the Rockhampton Region.

The Rockhampton Regional Library opened in 2008 at the time of the amalgamations. The Rockhampton North Library opening in 1971.

== Suburbs ==
The City of Rockhampton included the following settlements:

- Allenstown
- Berserker
- Depot Hill
- Fairy Bower
- Frenchville
- Kawana
- Koongal
- Lakes Creek^{*}
- Limestone Creek
- Mount Archer
- Norman Gardens
- Park Avenue
- Parkhurst
- Port Curtis
- Rockhampton City
- The Common
- The Range
- Wandal
- West Rockhampton

^{*} – shared with the Shire of Livingstone

== Population Estimates ==
Year	Population
1933	29,369
1947	34,988
1954	40,670
1961	44,128
1966	46,083
1971	49,164
1976	51,133
1981	52,383
1986	56,742
1991	59,394
1996	59,732
2001	59,382
2006	74,204
2007	75,195
2008	76,272
2009	77,448
2010	78,193
2011	78,939
2012	80,555
2013	81,745
2014	82,136
2015	82,026
2016	81,322
2017	81,354
2018	81,466
2019	81,936
2020	82,496
2021	82,904
2022	83,723
2023	85,500+
2024	*
2025	*

== Mayors ==
Year(s)	Mayor	Notes
1861	John Palmer	
1862	P. D. Mansfield	
1863	P. D. Mansfield and Richard McKelliget	
1864	Richard McKelliget	
1865	Edward Pike Livermore	
1866–1869	Robert Miller Hunter	
1870	T. Macdonald Paterson and C Scardon	
1871–1873	Edward Pike Livermore	
1874	William Pattison	
1875–1876	John Macfarlane	
1877–1878	William George Jackson	
1879	Albrecht Feez	
1880–1882	John Ferguson	
1882	Robert Sharples	
1883	John Ferguson	Went onto become one of Queensland's first federal senators.
1884	James Williamson	
1885	Jabez Wakefield	(d. 1903)
1886–1887	Thomas Kelly	
1888–1889	Sidney Williams	
1890	Thomas Kay Higson	
1891–1893	Frederick Augustus Morgan	
1894	Hugh Fiddes	
1895	Stewart Williamson Hartley	
1896–1897	W. Wilson Littler	
1896	Hugh Fiddes	
1899	Hugh Fiddes	
1900	Thomas Pennington	or R. Tallon
1901	Henry W. Johnson	
1902	S. Thomasson	
1903	Thomas Henderson	
1904	Arthur H Parnell	
1905	Harry Medcraf	
1906	Thomas Connolly	
1907	Arthur H. Parnell	
1908	Harry Medcraf	
1909	John Edgar	
1910	George Wilkinson	
1911	Harry Medcraf	
1912	Arthur H. Parnell	
1913	Thomas B. Renshaw	
1914	William Farrell	
1915	Theo W. Kingel and John Morrison	
1916	John Morrison	
1917	Theo W. Kingel	
1918	Charles Oliver Gough	
1919	Theo W. Kingel	
1920	Robert Elliott Hartley	
1921	William Charlton	
1922	William Charlton	
1923	William Charlton	
1924	Theodor William Kingel	
1925	Theodor William Kingel	
1926	Theodor William Kingel	
1927	Thomas Dunlop	
1928	Thomas Dunlop	
1929	Thomas Dunlop	
1929	Joseph Jeffries	
1929–1930	Robert Cousins	
1930–1936	Thomas Joseph Lee	
1936–1943	Robert William Evans	
1943–1952	Henry Jeffries	
1952–1982	Rex Pilbeam	
1982–1991	Jim Webber	
1991–1997	Lea Taylor	
1997–2000	Jim McRae	
2000–2008	Margaret Strelow	Was elected as the second mayor of the new Rockhampton Region in 2012
