= Henry Jeffries =

Australian politician

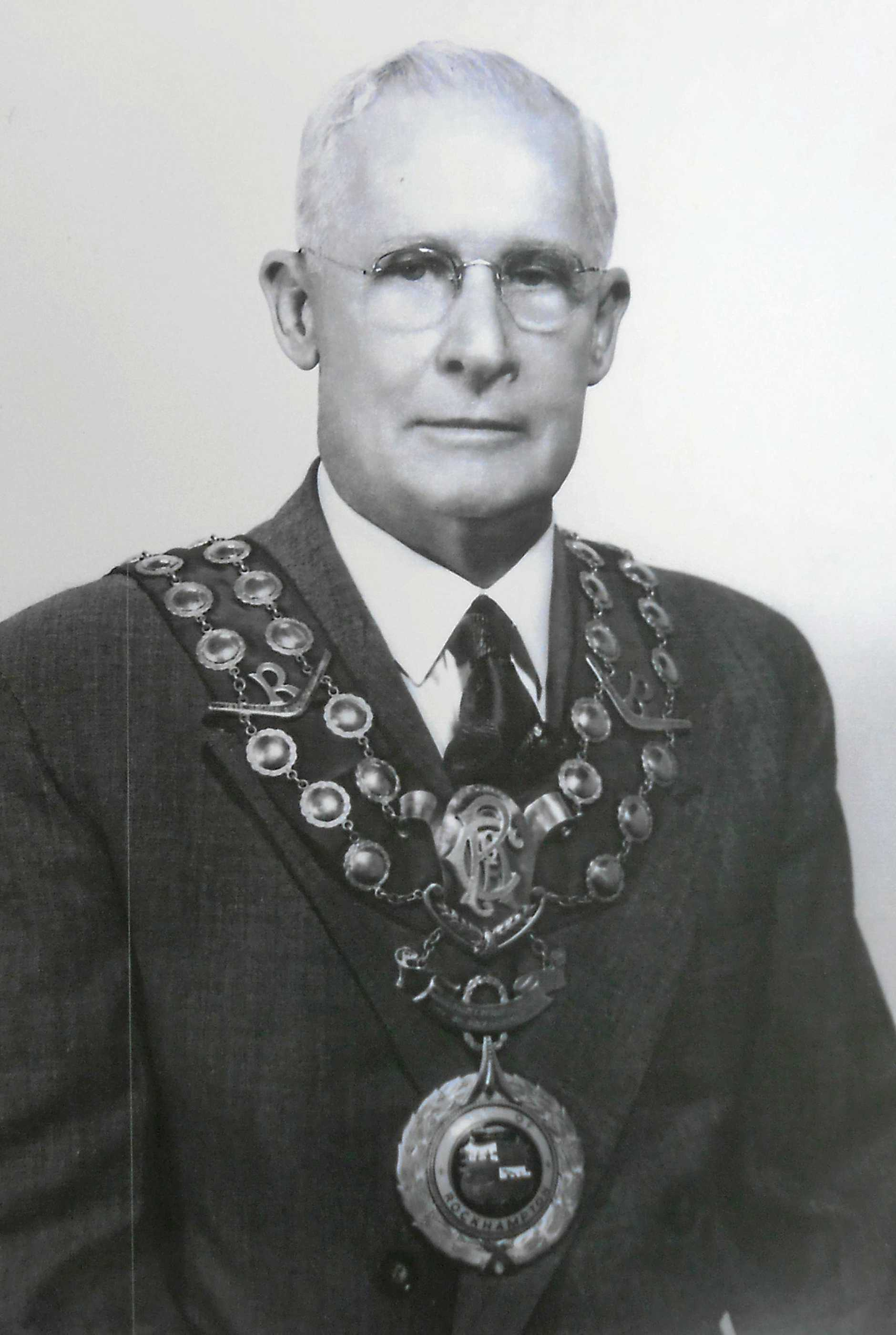
Henry Jeffries, mayor of Rockhampton from 1943 to 1952

Henry Jeffries (13 August 1889 – 22 April 1971) was an Australian politician. He served three terms as mayor of Rockhampton, Queensland from 1943 until 1952.

Jeffries was first elected to Rockhampton City Council as an alderman in 1939, before contesting the 1943 election vying for the position of mayor at the age of 53, representing the Civic Advancement Party. He won the election, narrowly beating incumbent Robert William Evans. Jeffries won the subsequent elections in 1946 and 1949.

His legacy includes overseeing the commencement of construction of Rockhampton's Fitzroy Bridge, turning the first sod at the construction site in 1945. Jeffries also had an ambitious plan to redevelop the Fitzroy riverbank in the Rockhampton CBD for recreational use.

Jeffries decided not to contest the 1952 local government elections, and was succeeded by Rex Pilbeam.

Jeffries married Violet Underwood on 17 February 1914 at the Rockhampton Baptist Tabernacle.

Prior to his career in local government, Jeffries had been employed for 25 years in the administration offices of the Queensland Railways Department in Rockhampton.

His sporting interests included rifle shooting and golf.

He died on 22 April 1971.
