= Victor Roffey =

Australian aviator

Frederick Victor Roffey
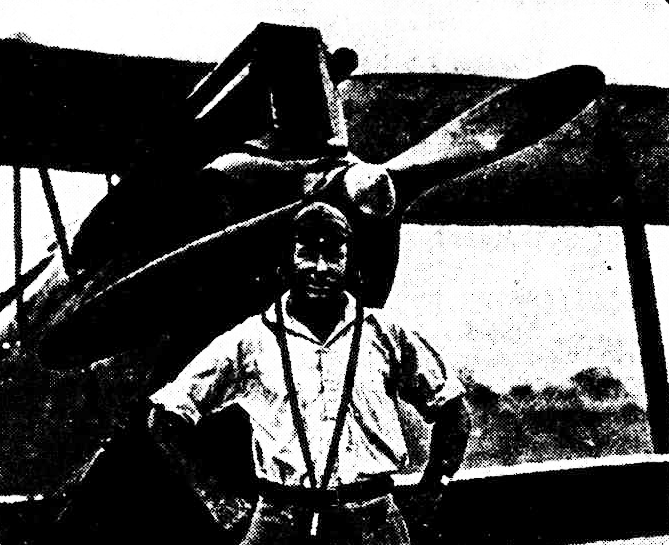
- Victor Roffey, 1931
- Born: 4 October 1908; Bundaberg, Queensland, Australia
- Died: 22 September 1993 (aged 87)
- Burial place: Springsure Cemetery, Springsure, Queensland, Australia; 24.1048°S 148.0862°E
- Monuments: Commemorative stone at Ouaco, New Caledonia
- Occupation: aviator
- Years active: 1931-1939
- Known for: The first person to fly from New Caledonia to Australia
- Notable work: 1931 solo flight from New Caledonia to Australia; 1933 landing on one wheel
- Spouse: Dorothy Clark (m.1939)
- Children: 4
- Awards: Shell Oil Company Aviation Plaque for a notable Australian flight

Frederick Victor Roffey (Note: While early newspaper articles state Roffey's name was Victor George Roffey, official documentation verifies Roffey's name as being Frederick Victor Roffey which is reflected in a newspaper story about a civic reception held in his honour after his historic flight, and also a newspaper report about his engagement in 1937. Roffey's brother Nathaniel William George Roffey was known as George.) (4 October 1908 - 22 September 1993) was an Australian aviator, best known for being the first person to fly from New Caledonia to Australia.

Roffey successfully completed the crossing at the age of 23 on 21 November 1931 in a de Havilland Gipsy Moth biplane called The Golden Eagle in which he flew from Ouaco to Rockhampton, via Marlborough, in just under 12 hours.

As such, Roffey is credited with opening up the flight path to New Caledonia, which would later become a tourist destination serviced by major airlines. In 2019, prior to the COVID-19 pandemic, New Caledonia was visited by 130,000 tourists.

== Early life ==
Roffey was born in Bundaberg, Queensland to parents Nathaniel Frederick Roffey and Alice Roffey (née Clark) on 4 October 1908. 44-year-old Nathaniel Roffey had married 20-year-old Clark on 20 December 1904.

Victor Roffey was one of Nathaniel and Alice Roffey's six children, three of whom died as infants. He was educated at Bundaberg Grammar School.

Nathaniel and Alice Roffey with their three surviving children, George, Victor and Melba, originally lived at Gaeta and then lived for a time on "Moondoondah" near Miriam Vale. In 1923, the family purchased a pastoral property called "Melbadale" in the rural locality of Goowarra, near the township of Dingo, west of Rockhampton.

== Learning to fly ==
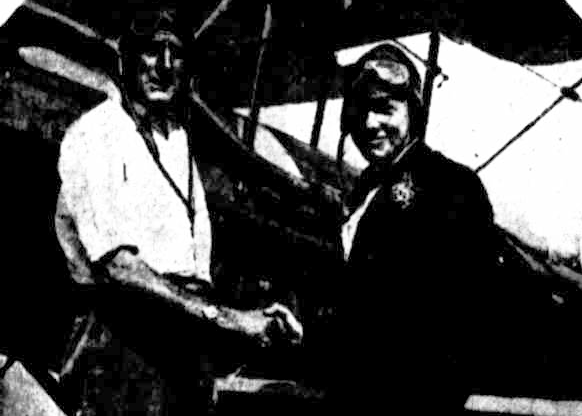
Harold Fraser and Victor Roffey, 1931

The Rockhampton Aero Club was officially opened on 2 March 1930 which was followed by the official opening of the Connor Park Aerodrome on 15 March 1930. The Rockhampton Aero Club held their first full-scale pageant on 23 August 1930 which was where Roffey's love of aviation was borne after paying to be taken up on a joy flight.

Described in the local press as an "unsophisticated bush lad", Roffey commenced flying lessons on 10 January 1931 with Harold Livingstone Fraser who had established a flying school at Connor Park.

Roffey purchased his Gipsy Moth aircraft for £1000 through Rockhampton Aerial Services with a condition Fraser give Roffey 12 hours of flying lessons.

== Plan to be a pioneer ==
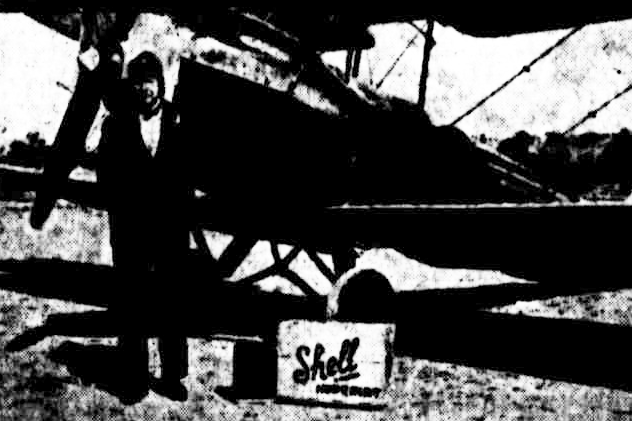
Roffey endorsing the Shell products he used during his flight, 1931

In a newspaper interview in January 1931, Roffey said he had no immediate plans to put his aircraft to any particular use.

However, with Charles Kingsford Smith and Charles Ulm having made their historic crossing of the Pacific Ocean aboard the Southern Cross in 1928, Roffey was keen to also be a pioneer of aviation in some way. After considering his options, Roffey believed the only thing left to pioneer was to fly the 1100 miles from New Caledonia to Australia so decided to mount an attempt to be the first person to do so.

In preparation, Roffey's plane was shipped over to New Caledonia where Roffey arrived in June 1931 to commence many hours of practice flying, during which he crashed the aircraft, which needed to be repaired.

Some experienced aviators expressed concerns and described the planned trip as "hazardous" particularly in such a small plane with a pilot that only had less than a year's flying experience. However, Roffey's tutor, Harold Fraser, said that he had confidence in his student's ability.

Roffey's planned trip between New Caledonia to Australia was postponed a number of times, including to allow additional petrol tanks to be fitted to the aircraft which would enable Roffey to complete the long journey.

The Shell Oil Company was heavily involved with Roffey's endeavour to be the first to fly from New Caledonia to Australia, communicating with the press on Roffey's behalf and providing Roffey with Shell products to use during his trip. In what was likely a form of embedded marketing, the Shell brand was mentioned numerous times in newspaper articles. After his journey, a newspaper photo was also published with Roffey standing in front of his plane beside a Shell logo.

== 1931 flight ==
=== Journey ===
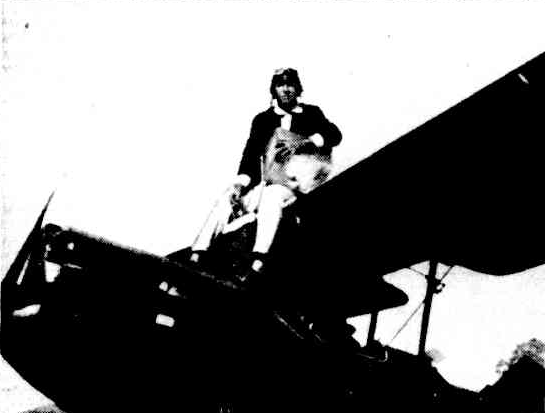
Roffey atop his aircraft on Magenta Beach in New Caledonia, 1931

With the course set for Bustard Head, south of Gladstone, Roffey departed Oauco, 150 miles of Noumea, at 5am on 21 November 1931, where a large crowd had gathered to watch him take off. Roffey's plane was carrying 850lbs including 72 gallons of fuel. Also on board were three bottles of French Clicquot champagne and a freshly picked bouquet of flowers which was handed to him by a local woman prior to taking off.

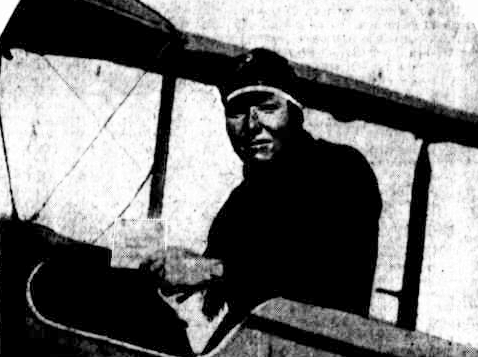
Roffey with one of the items from New Caledonia's first airmail which he carried with him, 1931

Roffey was also carrying the first airmail ever to be sent from New Caledonia, which consisted of 137 letters.

According to Roffey, he experienced relatively clear weather for the first few hours of his flight with the exception of a light shower, 90 miles after departure.

After Cato Reef came into sight, Roffey's aircraft headed into a thunderstorm where strong winds buffeted the plane with heavy rain causing him to fly blind for a period of time. Roffey attempted to climb out of the storm and increased his altitude to 10,000 feet without success, before descending to 7,000 feet where the aircraft straightened out in a clearer atmosphere. Despite this, Roffey said the storm didn't frighten him although it lasted for over an hour.

He then described seeing the long line of white surf as he approached the coast, although the coastline took longer to reach than Roffey had anticipated. After the coastline quickly took shape, Roffey said he was flying over Queensland soil in a matter of minutes.

"The visibility was not the best but at last the blurred outline of the shore came into sight. It was my great moment. I had done the job," he recalled.

However, when Roffey attempted to pinpoint his location, he assumed he was flying south of Rockhampton so turned his aircraft north. After flying in that direction for 20 minutes, he turned inland for the railway line where after seeing some houses and open land, Roffey landed his aircraft at 3pm to get his bearings and determine his whereabouts.

Touching down, Roffey became the first person to fly from New Caledonia to Australia.

After talking to some locals, Roffey learned he was in Marlborough, north of Rockhampton, where the residents he talked to gave him a cup of tea and some refreshments to eat before Roffey departed for Rockhampton.

At this stage, Roffey had considered bypassing Rockhampton and flying straight home to Goowarra, but after a phone conversation with a reporter from The Morning Bulletin who was waiting at the Rockhampton aerodrome hopeful of Roffey's arrival, he was persuaded to continue his flight to Rockhampton.

Roffey described the flight from Marlborough to Rockhampton as "uneventful" but it remained a proud moment when he stepped out of the plane at Connor Park at Rockhampton at 4:45pm, having finally completed his flight.

Roffey described the engine as having functioned perfectly throughout his journey which he considered a wonderful tribute to British workmanship.

In a newspaper interview, his mother exclaimed "My boy! My boy! I knew he would do it!". She also revealed that he had sent her a cable message just prior to his departure from New Caledonia which simply said "Left at 5am."

Roffey's feat was widely reported in the national press.

=== Civic receptions ===
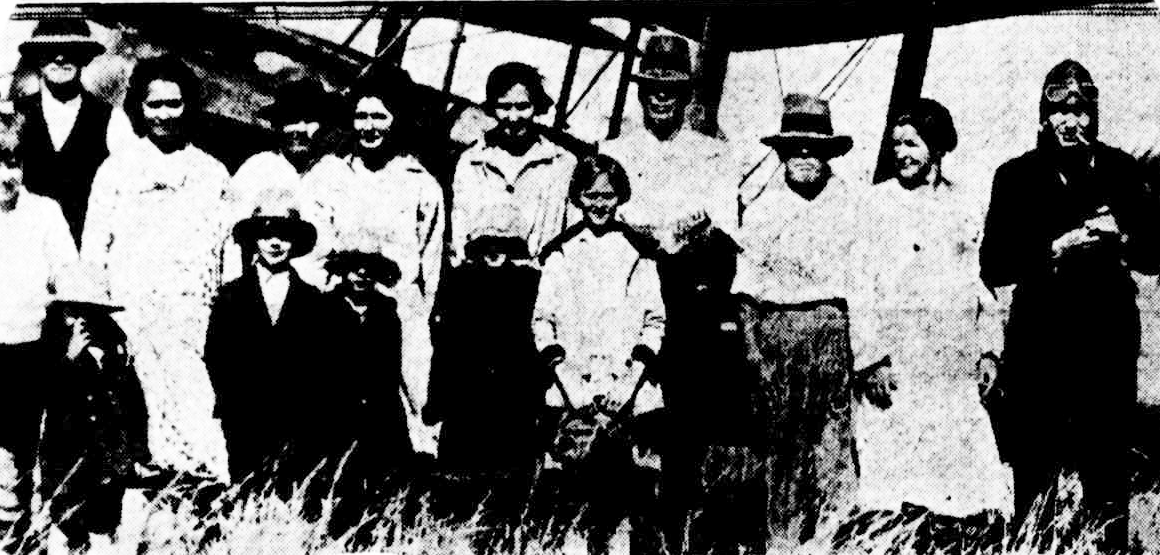
Roffey (far right) with family, friends and supporters at Goowarra, 1931

A civic reception was held at Rockhampton's Wintergarden Theatre after Roffey's arrival. Roffey was introduced by state MP for Keppel Owen Daniel who also read a message of congratulations from Sir John Goodwin, the Governor of Queensland. Representatives from Shell with whom Roffey had worked with prior to his flight, were also in attendance.

A civic reception was also held in Dingo on 23 November 1921. Roffey flew from "Melbadale" to Dingo with his father as a passenger to attend the reception. When Roffey attempted to land his plane in the main street of Dingo, he collided with a parked car and two gate posts as he attempted to navigate around the obstacles in the street. Despite this, his fellow members from the Dingo Cricket Club hoisted him up on their shoulders and took him to the Dingo Hall where the civic reception was being held.

Another community celebration in Roffey's honour was held in the Dingo Hall on 28 November 1931 in the form of a dance. Several model aeroplanes were suspended from the ceiling at this event with an impressive detailed 2-foot model aeroplane placed in the centre of the table on the stage. It was constructed by Joseph Henry Bauman and included an instrument panel, cockpit, wind gauge, exhaust pipe and a battery-powered propeller.

A further civic reception for Roffey was held in Duaringa on 3 December 1931 to coincide with the final Duaringa Shire Council meeting of 1931. Following the conclusion of the council meeting, the councillors proceeded to the Duaringa Hotel where they raised a toast to Roffey before a public reception for Roffey was held in Fletcher's Hall at 8pm.

Some newspapers had described Roffey as being from Duaringa, which caused some minor upset amongst Dingo residents, as the locality of Goowarra is nearer to Dingo.

=== Customs and quarantine breaches ===
Entering Australia without a pratique, and bringing three bottles of French champagne and hand-picked flowers into the country drew the ire of customs and quarantine officials.

The Collector of Customs warned Roffey that if he wanted to keep the champagne, he was required to pay duty at a rate of 57 shillings per gallon. Quarantine officials also demanded a sample from the bouquet of flowers Roffey received so they could be examined and declared free of disease.

They also warned Roffey that he had breached quarantine regulations by entering Australia without a pratique, which was unable to be overlooked due to it being an essential procedure.

As a result, Roffey appeared in the Rockhampton Summons Court on 16 December 1931 where he pleaded guilty to a breach of quarantine regulations by failing to report to the department at the conclusion of his flight.

Roffey was fined £1 and ordered to pay 3s/6d and £2/2s/0d in court and professional costs.

=== Awards and commemorations ===
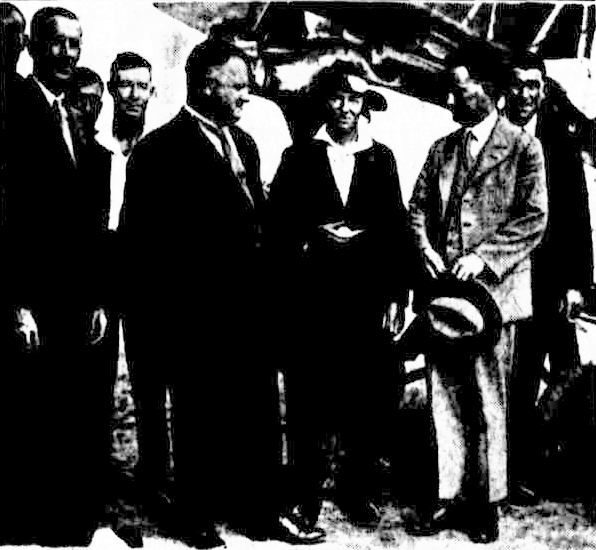
Roffey receiving the Shell Oil Company's Aviation Plaque, 1932

At a special ceremony on 12 April 1932 at the Connor Park Aerodrome, Rockhampton mayor Thomas Lee presented Roffey with the Shell Oil Company's Aviation Plaque which was an award given to aviators for undertaking Australia's most notable flights. As Federal MP for Capricornia, Frank Forde also attended the ceremony and congratulated Roffey for his achievement.

In 1971, the Rotary Club of Noumea established the "Roffey Commission" to commemorate the 40th anniversary of Roffey's flight. The event was "celebrated with brilliance" with Roffey being a guest of honour during the celebrations where he attended the inauguration of a commemorative stone at Ouaco detailing his flight.

In 1981, a commemorative postage stamp was issued by the Office of Posts and Telecommunications of New Caledonia to commemorate the 50th anniversary of Roffey's flight.

It's yet unknown whether any events are planned for the 100th anniversary of Roffey's flight either in Australia or New Caledonia in 2031.

== 1933 incident ==
In May 1933, Roffey was involved in an incident where one of the wheels from his aircraft fell off as he took off from Bluff. Spectators on the ground successfully warned Roffey of the danger by holding the wheel up in the air. Roffey flew his aircraft home to Goowarra where he successfully landed the plane with just one wheel, although the plane suffered considerable damage including a broken propeller and broken struts, wires and rudder.

== Personal life ==
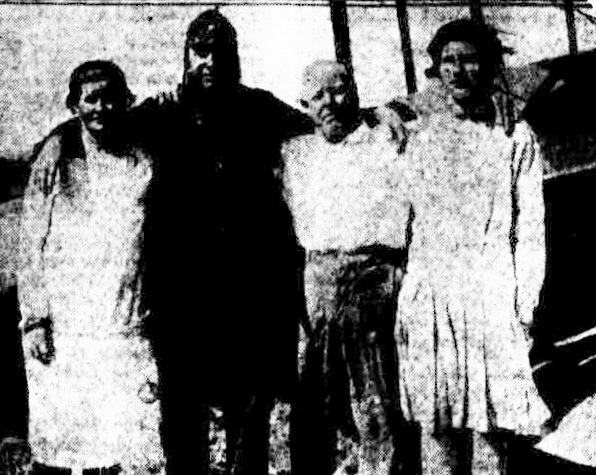
Roffey with his mother Alice Roffey, father Nathaniel Frederick Roffey and sister Melba Laver, 1931

In 1937, the engagement was announced between Roffey and Dorothy Clark. They were married on 8 January 1938. They had four children - Victor, Lance, Dale and Alan.

Roffey was an uncle to Australian tennis great Rod Laver. While Roffey was preparing for his historic flight from New Caledonia to Australia, his sister Melba Roffey married Roy Laver. Melba and Roy Laver had four children, one of whom was Rod Laver born in 1938.

In Rod Laver's 2013 memoir, a young Rod Laver and Roffey's son Victor are pictured in a family photo standing in front of the "family rattletrap" as the cousins prepared to travel to Brisbane so Laver could compete in his first junior tennis titles. In the same memoir, Roffey's mother (and Laver's grandmother) Alice Roffey is remembered fondly by Laver as an active woman who was still able to ride horses up until her death.

In 1938, Roffey was clocked at driving 45 miles per hour on Yeppoon Road between Rockhampton and Yeppoon. He pleaded guilty and was fined £5/10s/- (and 6s/- in costs) for driving a motor car at a speed greater than 30 miles per hour.

Roffey sold The Golden Eagle in 1939.

Roffey's father Nathaniel died at the age of 85 in 1946 and was buried in the North Rockhampton Cemetery. Alice Roffey sold "Melbadale" in 1954 and relocated to Springsure to reside with her son George. She died at the age of 82 in 1967 and was buried in the Springsure Cemetery.

Victor Roffey died on 22 September 1993 at the age of 85 and was also buried in Springsure.
