= Rex Pilbeam =

Australian politician (1907–1999)

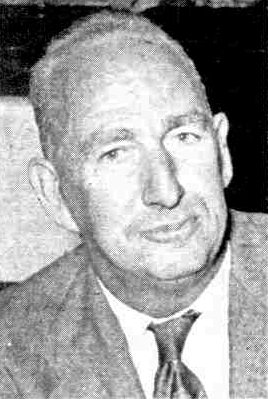
- Pilbeam in 1953

Member of the Queensland Legislative Assembly for Rockhampton South
- In office 28 May 1960 – 17 May 1969
- Preceded by: New seat
- Succeeded by: Keith Wright

Personal details
- Born: Reginald Byron Jarvis Pilbeam; 30 October 1907 Longreach, Queensland, Australia
- Died: 31 July 1999 (aged 91) Brisbane, Queensland, Australia
- Party: Liberal Party
- Spouse: Barbara Winning Rose (m.1927 d.1994)
- Occupation: Accountant

Reginald Byron Jarvis "Rex" Pilbeam (30 October 1907 – 31 July 1999) was a member of the Queensland Legislative Assembly and long-serving mayor of Rockhampton.

== Biography ==
Pilbeam was born on 30 October 1907, at Longreach, Queensland, to John Thomas Pilbeam and his wife Ellen (née Tonks). He was educated at Emu Park State School before attending Rockhampton High School and then earned his accountancy and secretarial qualifications by external studies.

Pilbeam became a practising public accountant and joined the Australian Army in 1944, serving with the 61st Australian Infantry Battalion and being discharged the next year with the rank of Staff Sergeant.

On 21 January 1927, Pilbeam married Barbara Winning Rose (died 1994) and together they had two sons. He died in Brisbane in July 1999 and was cremated at the Albany Creek Crematorium in Brisbane.

== Public life ==
Pilbeam first entered politics in 1952, elected to Rockhampton City Council as Mayor of Rockhampton at the age of 44. Prior to the election, Pilbeam campaigned on an ambitious platform with an agenda consisting of better financial management, lowering rates, securing a more adequate water supply, sealing the city's streets, and establishing a better sewerage system for the city's residents.

Pilbeam was elected at the Rockhampton City Council election which was held on 31 May 1952, with a three-to-one majority over his nearest rival, Labour candidate Francis Baker.

Pilbeam was also the Liberal Party member for Rockhampton South in the Queensland Legislative Assembly from the seat's inception in 1960 until his defeat by Keith Wright in 1969.

However, Pilbeam continued to be mayor of Rockhampton City Council for a record 30 years. His mayoralty came to an end in 1982 when he was defeated by 41-year-old Jim Webber who was successful on his third attempt to unseat Pilbeam.

Upon assuming the role as Rockhampton mayor, Jim Webber dutifully paid tribute to Pilbeam's contribution to the city, but he also commented that many people thought 74-year-old Pilbeam had become too old to continue as mayor. Webber also said that his aim was to consult with more people than Pilbeam did when making decisions and unlike Pilbeam, he wouldn't be running "a one man show".

== 1953 attempted murder ==
Just over a year into his first term, Pilbeam was shot in the chest by a former lover. He was shot on Lion Creek Road in the early hours of 8 June 1953, by 26-year-old Jean Frances McGregor Jennings with a .22 calibre revolver. After being shot, Pilbeam drove himself home despite his bullet wound. Upon arriving home, his wife called an ambulance and Pilbeam was taken to Tannachy Hospital where he was a patient for several weeks. Doctors said that he suffered a single bullet wound, and the bullet was embedded near his spine. Jennings was arrested the day after shooting Pilbeam and was charged with unlawfully attempting to kill.

Details of Pilbeam's adulterous affair with Jennings were revealed during court proceedings in the weeks after the incident. The affair had commenced in 1949 and ended in mid-1952. It was revealed that during the affair Pilbeam had visited Jennings in Brisbane a number of times, bought her jewellery, made promises of marriage and had even stayed with Jennings at a hotel in Maroochydore under assumed names.

Jennings had worked as a typist at the Rockhampton Agricultural Society from 1945 until 1950 before deciding to go to Brisbane. She worked at various firms in Brisbane before returning to Rockhampton in October 1952, when Pilbeam was several months into his first term as mayor. Prior to the shooting, Jennings had been asking Pilbeam to be reinstated in her old job at the Rockhampton Agricultural Society and when he refused to help, Jennings threatened to publicly release love letters that he had written.

On 30 August 1953, Jennings was found guilty of attempted murder by a jury, and she was sentenced to two years gaol, but the sentence was suspended on a £100 bond.

Following the verdict, Pilbeam announced his resignation as mayor of Rockhampton City Council and asked for the people of Rockhampton to be given the opportunity to decide whether he deserved to continue to be mayor following the shooting and the details of his affair becoming public knowledge. Pilbeam was re-elected on 31 October 1953, but with a significantly reduced majority.

Despite the affair with Jennings, Pilbeam remained married to his wife Barbara and the two were married for 67 years before she died in 1994.

== Male chauvinism accusations ==
Pilbeam again became a national topic of conversation when a 19-year-old librarian assistant employed by Rockhampton City Council had her employment terminated in August 1977 because she got married. Janine Marshall had started working for Rockhampton City Council when she was 15 years old, and had intended to keep working after she got married but was sacked by Pilbeam because of a policy of not employing married women.

This prompted the Australian Arbitration Commission to rule in April 1978 that the sacking of female council employees when they got married was clearly discriminatory, and a clause was inserted into the Municipal Officer Award that protected relevant employees. The Full Bench of the Australian Arbitration Commission said that the policy was not only discriminatory but was contrary to the avowed aims of the International Labour Organization and the Australian Government.

Pilbeam's controversial attitude towards and comments about women became the centre of a national debate in the late 1970s. In an interview with The Australian Women's Weekly, he stated: "I deplore married women putting themselves on the same level as men, and I'll tell you why. They are 300 percent better than men. They are a better animal than man. Whoever got the idea that a woman was a lesser animal? Whether we're human animals or not, we're still animals. I've bred birds and I've bred dogs, and I can tell you the worst kind of animal you can ever breed from is a masculine bitch. Or a hen that thinks she is a rooster and crows. It's an unnatural urge."

== Buddies ==
Following his election defeat in 1982, Pilbeam teamed up with Rockhampton-born film maker John Dingwall to help raise the necessary money to produce the Australian film Buddies, which was filmed on The Gemfields, west of Rockhampton. Although distributors were reluctant to release the film, Dingwall took the film around Australia where he showed the movie at special screenings. The film's premiere was in Rockhampton in 1983. The movie starred Colin Friels, Kris McQuade and Harold Hopkins with Pilbeam making a brief cameo appearance.

== Legacy ==
=== Fitzroy River Barrage ===
The Fitzroy River Barrage water storage facility on the Fitzroy River is generally viewed by many as the biggest legacy left by Pilbeam. The barrage was constructed as part of Pilbeam's water scheme which was aimed at guaranteeing a permanent water supply for the Rockhampton area. The structure was officially commissioned on 19 March 1970 by the Premier of Queensland, Sir Joh Bjelke-Petersen. The Fitzroy River Barrage separates the fresh water upstream from the tidal salt water downstream, enabling fresh water to be pumped to the Glenmore Water Treatment Plant for the city's water supply. The water storage area has a capacity of 80,300 megalitres which extends 60 kilometres upstream. The structure features 18 lift gates which can be opened during river rises to allow excess water to escape downstream.

=== World War II Memorial Pool ===
Prior to Pilbeam assuming office in 1952, Rockhampton's ratepayers had overwhelmingly rejected a proposal to establish a local swimming pool, due to what many viewed as an unnecessary and expensive cost. After Pilbeam became mayor, he introduced his own fundraising scheme to fund a swimming pool. He walked door-to-door and explained his vision for a swimming pool to be built in Rockhampton, before handing out money boxes for residents to donate any change they could spare. When the money boxes were collected, over a million pennies were received.

Pilbeam's money box scheme, combined with other fundraising projects, resulted in enough money being raised without the council needing to spend anything on the pool, with the exception of funding the diving board. The first sod of the World War II Memorial Pool was turned during a ceremony on 15 December 1958. Pilbeam declined to use a ceremonial spade to turn a small amount of earth. Instead, he opted to use a bulldozer with a ripper attached to dig a deep trench, to mark the start of the project. During the 'turning of the sod' ceremony, he thanked the householders who had generously donated £5,500 via his money box scheme. Employees at local businesses had also raised over £6000 by having small contributions deducted from their wages.

The World War II Memorial Pool was opened on 26 March 1960 which was marked with a swimming carnival where some well-known swimmers in attendance.

The original 50 metre pool was demolished in 2013 when the site underwent an extensive expansion which saw the World War II Memorial Pool renamed to the 2nd World War Memorial Aquatic Centre in 2014. The site now consists of a heated 50-metre FINA-compliant 10-lane pool, a heated 25-metre 8-lane pool, a Learn-to-Swim pool and a children's water play area.

=== Rockhampton Art Gallery ===
Rex Pilbeam became known for his yearning to establish an art gallery in Rockhampton. In 1965, Pilbeam announced that the director of the Queensland Art Gallery, Laurence Thomas, would be visiting Rockhampton to discuss setting up a small gallery of artworks at City Hall. Pilbeam said Rockhampton had the potential to be the first country branch of the Queensland Art Gallery. On 13 September 1967, The Lord Casey officially opened the gallery in the auditorium at Rockhampton City Hall where a rotating selection of pictures from the Brisbane collection began being displayed.

In 1976, Pilbeam established an Art Acquisition Fund with several other community leaders including Bishop John Bayton, architect Neil McKendry and the director of the Rockhampton Art Gallery, Don Taylor. Pilbeam soon noticed a Federal Government scheme where galleries were provided with a 70% subsidy for each piece of art, to assist contemporary Australian artists. To take advantage of this program, Pilbeam led the Art Acquisition Committee on a journey and they selected a variety of art, totalling $350,000.

When learning of Pilbeam's ambitious desire to take advantage of the subsidy scheme, the Federal Government were reluctant to pay out, despite assurances that the subsidy was still available. A settlement was eventually reached where the Art Acquisition Committee was allowed to purchase $500,000 worth of artworks, for just $60,000. The collection of work included works by artists such as Arthur Boyd, Sidney Nolan and Russell Drysdale.

A new purpose-built Rockhampton Art Gallery was officially opened on 6 June 1979, where Pilbeam took the opportunity to encourage the future citizens of Rockhampton to maintain and advance the gallery as it was the least the citizens of the future could expect in return for the splendid contribution made by the citizens of the 1970s.

=== Pilbeam Theatre ===
Of the several places in the Rockhampton area that bear Pilbeam's name, The Pilbeam Theatre is the most recognisable. The Pilbeam Theatre is a 1000-seat entertainment venue on the banks of the Fitzroy River which frequently plays host to Australian and internationally renowned performers and stage productions, as well as local productions.

The venue was officially opened on 6 June 1979 by Sir Zelman Cowen who said at the time that Pilbeam should take great pleasure in the theatre being named after him as recognition for his efforts for the city. In his own speech, Pilbeam said that the opening of the theatre and adjoining art gallery were high points of his civic career.

=== Pilbeam Drive ===
Although bushwalking tracks had been cut in 1932, it was Pilbeam who ensured that a road for vehicular traffic was built up to the peak of Mount Archer which overlooks the city. The road was opened in May 1965 and was named Pilbeam Drive, as it was said at the time that it was only Pilbeam who had the "drive" to see the project through, and for having the vision of enabling tourists and locals alike to enjoy panoramic views of the city. Complaints about the cost of the project were made void as the entire cost was recouped through the auction of mountain allotments.

=== Sewerage system ===
During Pilbeam's thirty years as mayor, he managed to see that the entire city was completely sewered. To mark the completion of the sewerage program, Pilbeam organised a ceremonial burning of the city's last night soil cart that took place in front of City Hall in 1978. The funeral pyre was lit by the council's oldest living former employee, 90-year-old Alexander Bartlem. Pilbeam said he believed the ceremonial burning was an historic occasion as it signalled the end of an unpleasant and often unhealthy era for Rockhampton.

=== Pilbeam Park ===
There is a sports ground in the suburb of Lakes Creek called Pilbeam Park, which is home to the Nerimbera Brothers Football Club. The clubhouse and the sports ground suffered extensive damage when Tropical Cyclone Marcia struck Rockhampton on 20 February 2015.

=== Portrait of Rex Pilbeam ===
In 1977, Rex Pilbeam sat for six sittings for renowned Australian artist Sir William Dargie as Dargie completed Portrait of Rex Pilbeam, an oil on canvas work featuring Pilbeam in a grey pin-striped suit with maroon tie. The portrait is now a part of the William Dargie collection housed at the Rockhampton Art Gallery.

Parliament of Queensland
New seat	Member for Rockhampton South; 1960–1969	Succeeded by Keith Wright
