= Electoral results for the district of Rockhampton North =

Queensland, Australia, district election results

This is a list of electoral results for the electoral district of Rockhampton North in Queensland state elections.

== Members for Rockhampton North ==
First incarnation (1888–1912)
Member	Party	Term
Rees Jones		1888–1893
William Harding	Independent	1893–1896
James Stewart	Labour	1896–1901
Henry Turner	Labour	1901
John Linnett	Independent	1901–1902
Henry Turner	Labour	1902–1907
James Brennan	Kidstonites	1907–1909
James Brennan	Liberal	1909–1912
Second incarnation 1960–1992
Merv Thackeray	Labor Party	1960–1972
Merv Thackeray	Independent	1972
Les Yewdale	Labor	1972–1989
Robert Schwarten	Labor	1989–1992

== Election results ==
=== Elections in the 1980s ===
1989 Queensland state election: Rockhampton North
Party	Candidate	Votes	%	±%
Labor	Robert Schwarten	11,358	55.4	−0.8
National	Lee Nevison	5,938	29.0	−6.5
Liberal	Alan Cornick	2,131	10.4	+10.4
Citizens Electoral Council	Len Clampett	834	4.1	+4.1
Citizens Electoral Council	Jon Harding	239	1.2	+1.2
Total formal votes		20,500	97.6	−0.5
Informal votes		493	2.4	+0.5
Turnout		20,993	93.7	+0.4
Two-party-preferred result
Labor	Robert Schwarten	12,013	58.6	−1.7
National	Lee Nevison	8,487	41.4	+1.7
Labor hold		Swing	−1.7	

1986 Queensland state election: Rockhampton North
Party	Candidate	Votes	%	±%
Labor	Les Yewdale	10,537	56.2	−2.5
National	Bob Simpson	6,658	35.5	+2.0
Independent	John Murphy	1,560	8.3	+8.3
Total formal votes		18,755	98.1	
Informal votes		364	1.9	
Turnout		19,119	93.3	
Two-party-preferred result
Labor	Les Yewdale	11,309	60.3	+0.8
National	Bob Simpson	7,446	39.7	−0.8
Labor hold		Swing	+0.8	

1983 Queensland state election: Rockhampton North
Party	Candidate	Votes	%	±%
Labor	Les Yewdale	11,408	58.7	+0.8
National	Patrick Maloney	6,510	33.5	+4.2
Liberal	Beverley Reynolds	1,521	7.8	−0.2
Total formal votes		19,439	99.1	−0.2
Informal votes		175	0.9	+0.2
Turnout		19,614	94.1	+1.8
Two-party-preferred result
Labor	Les Yewdale	11,748	60.4	−1.8
National	Patrick Maloney	7,691	39.6	+1.8
Labor hold		Swing	−1.8	

1980 Queensland state election: Rockhampton North
Party	Candidate	Votes	%	±%
Labor	Les Yewdale	9,978	57.9	−6.3
National	Robert Simpson	5,046	29.3	+15.3
Liberal	Keith Harris	1,381	8.0	−13.8
Independent	Patrick Carroll	757	4.4	+4.4
Socialist	Jeffrey Jones	86	0.5	+0.5
Total formal votes		17,248	99.2	+0.1
Informal votes		138	0.8	−0.1
Turnout		17,386	92.3	−3.0
Two-party-preferred result
Labor	Les Yewdale	10,730	62.2	−4.0
National	Robert Simpson	6,518	37.8	+37.8
Labor hold		Swing	−4.0	

=== Elections in the 1970s ===
1977 Queensland state election: Rockhampton North
Party	Candidate	Votes	%	±%
Labor	Les Yewdale	10,397	64.2	+9.7
Liberal	James Rundle	3,526	21.8	−17.9
National	Donald King	2,261	14.0	+14.0
Total formal votes		16,184	99.1	
Informal votes		147	0.9	
Turnout		16,331	95.3	
Two-party-preferred result
Labor	Les Yewdale	10,714	66.2	+10.1
Liberal	James Rundle	5,470	33.8	−10.1
Labor hold		Swing	+10.1	

1974 Queensland state election: Rockhampton North
Party	Candidate	Votes	%	±%
Labor	Les Yewdale	8,074	54.5	+10.5
Liberal	T.R. Young	5,879	39.7	+15.1
Queensland Labor	John Dunn	860	5.8	−2.3
Total formal votes		14,813	98.9	+0.3
Informal votes		162	1.1	−0.3
Turnout		14,975	95.1	−1.7
Two-party-preferred result
Labor	Les Yewdale	8,315	56.1	+5.0
Liberal	T.R. Young	5,781	43.9	−5.0
Labor hold		Swing	+5.0	

1972 Queensland state election: Rockhampton North
Party	Candidate	Votes	%	±%
Labor	Les Yewdale	5,639	44.0	−21.8
Liberal	Peter Vamvakaris	3,156	24.6	+0.7
Independent	Merv Thackeray	2,969	23.2	+23.2
Queensland Labor	John McKenna	1,042	8.1	−2.3
Total formal votes		12,806	98.6	
Informal votes		175	1.4	
Turnout		12,981	96.8	
Two-party-preferred result
Labor	Les Yewdale	6,540	51.1	−14.9
Liberal	Peter Vamvakaris	6,266	48.9	+14.9
Labor hold		Swing	−14.9	

=== Elections in the 1960s ===
1969 Queensland state election: Rockhampton North
Party	Candidate	Votes	%	±%
Labor	Merv Thackeray	8,763	65.8	+1.4
Liberal	Philip German	3,183	23.9	−3.1
Queensland Labor	John Dunn	1,380	10.4	+1.8
Total formal votes		13,326	98.7	−0.3
Informal votes		177	1.3	+0.3
Turnout		13,503	94.2	−1.6
Two-party-preferred result
Labor	Merv Thackeray	8,981	67.4	+0.7
Liberal	Philip German	4,345	32.6	−0.7
Labor hold		Swing	+0.7	

1966 Queensland state election: Rockhampton North
Party	Candidate	Votes	%	±%
Labor	Merv Thackeray	8,221	64.4	−0.5
Liberal	Robert Woodrow	3,450	27.0	−0.1
Queensland Labor	Iris Burke	1,101	8.6	+0.5
Total formal votes		12,772	99.0	+0.4
Informal votes		129	1.0	−0.4
Turnout		12,901	95.8	−0.1
Two-party-preferred result
Labor	Merv Thackeray	8,523	66.7	+0.3
Liberal	Robert Woodrow	4,249	33.3	−0.3
Labor hold		Swing	+0.3	

1963 Queensland state election: Rockhampton North
Party	Candidate	Votes	%	±%
Labor	Merv Thackeray	7,933	64.9	+4.9
Liberal	Phil German	3,308	27.1	+0.8
Queensland Labor	Richard Wasson	985	8.1	−5.6
Total formal votes		12,226	98.6	−0.5
Informal votes		171	1.4	+0.5
Turnout		12,397	95.9	+0.5
Two-party-preferred result
Labor	Merv Thackeray	8,116	66.4	
Liberal	Phil German	4,110	33.6	
Labor hold		Swing	N/A	

1960 Queensland state election: Rockhampton North
Party	Candidate	Votes	%	±%
Labor	Merv Thackeray	7,312	60.0	
Liberal	Hector MacDonald	3,205	26.3	
Queensland Labor	James Verney	1,667	13.7	
Total formal votes		12,184	99.1	
Informal votes		109	0.9	
Turnout		12,293	95.4	
Labor win		(new seat)		
