= Electoral results for the district of Keppel =

Queensland, Australia, district election results

This is a list of electoral results for the electoral district of Keppel in Queensland state elections.

== Members for Keppel ==
First incarnation (1912–1960)
Member	Party	Term
James Larcombe	Labor	1912–1929
Owen Daniel	Country and Progressive National	1929–1936
David Daniel	Country	1936–1944
Walter Ingram	Labor	1944–1952
Viv Cooper	Labor	1952–1957
Viv Cooper	Queensland Labor	1957
Merv Thackeray	Labor	1957–1960
Second incarnation (1992–present)
Member	Party	Term
Vince Lester	National	1992–2004
Paul Hoolihan	Labor	2004–2012
Bruce Young	Liberal National	2012–2015
Brittany Lauga	Labor	2015–2024
Nigel Hutton	Liberal National	2024–present

== Election results ==
=== Elections in the 2020s ===
2024 Queensland state election: Keppel
Party	Candidate	Votes	%	±%
Liberal National	Nigel Hutton	12,684	36.09	+6.52
Labor	Brittany Lauga	10,376	29.52	−16.70
One Nation	James Ashby	8,807	25.06	+9.41
Greens	Clancy Mullbrick	1,668	4.75	+0.76
Independent	Petrina Murphy	806	2.29	+2.29
Family First	Roger McWhinney	804	2.29	+2.29
Total formal votes		35,145	96.44	−0.64
Informal votes		1,296	3.56	+0.64
Turnout		36,441	90.21	+0.17
Two-party-preferred result
Liberal National	Nigel Hutton	21,254	60.48	+16.11
Labor	Brittany Lauga	13,891	39.52	−16.11
Liberal National gain from Labor		Swing	+16.11	

2020 Queensland state election: Keppel
Party	Candidate	Votes	%	±%
Labor	Brittany Lauga	14,969	46.22	+3.16
Liberal National	Adrian de Groot	9,576	29.57	+4.67
One Nation	Wade Rothery	5,069	15.65	−9.80
Greens	Clancy Mullbrick	1,291	3.99	−2.61
Legalise Cannabis	Jimmy Dockery	862	2.66	+2.66
Informed Medical Options	Paula Ganfield	430	1.33	+1.33
United Australia	Nikki Smeltz	192	0.59	+0.59
Total formal votes		32,389	97.08	+0.52
Informal votes		973	2.92	−0.52
Turnout		33,362	90.04	−0.58
Two-party-preferred result
Labor	Brittany Lauga	18,018	55.63	−0.10
Liberal National	Adrian de Groot	14,371	44.37	+0.10
Labor hold		Swing	−0.10	

=== Elections in the 2010s ===
2017 Queensland state election: Keppel
Party	Candidate	Votes	%	±%
Labor	Brittany Lauga	13,304	43.1	−0.8
One Nation	Matt Loth	7,865	25.5	+25.5
Liberal National	Peter Blundell	7,691	24.9	−15.0
Greens	Clancy Mullbrick	2,039	6.6	+1.8
Total formal votes		30,899	96.6	−1.7
Informal votes		1,098	3.4	+1.7
Turnout		31,997	90.6	+2.5
Two-candidate-preferred result
Labor	Brittany Lauga	16,419	53.1	−1.0
One Nation	Matt Loth	14,480	46.9	+46.9
Labor hold		Swing	−1.0	

2015 Queensland state election: Keppel
Party	Candidate	Votes	%	±%
Labor	Brittany Lauga	14,403	44.43	+10.98
Liberal National	Bruce Young	12,698	39.17	−5.08
Palmer United	Warren Purnell	2,679	8.26	+8.26
Greens	Brandon Jones	1,497	4.62	−1.80
Independent	Bruce Diamond	1,143	3.53	+3.53
Total formal votes		32,420	98.32	+0.37
Informal votes		554	1.68	−0.37
Turnout		32,974	92.56	−0.14
Two-party-preferred result
Labor	Brittany Lauga	16,465	54.80	+11.19
Liberal National	Bruce Young	13,583	45.20	−11.19
Labor gain from Liberal National		Swing	+11.19	

2012 Queensland state election: Keppel
Party	Candidate	Votes	%	±%
Liberal National	Bruce Young	13,143	44.25	+4.86
Labor	Paul Hoolihan	9,935	33.45	−19.13
Katter's Australian	Luke Hargreaves	4,722	15.90	+15.90
Greens	Paul Bambrick	1,905	6.41	−1.62
Total formal votes		29.705	97.95	−0.20
Informal votes		622	2.05	+0.20
Turnout		30,327	92.69	+0.26
Two-party-preferred result
Liberal National	Bruce Young	14,757	56.39	+14.01
Labor	Paul Hoolihan	11,411	43.61	−14.01
Liberal National gain from Labor		Swing	+14.01	

=== Elections in the 2000s ===
2009 Queensland state election: Keppel
Party	Candidate	Votes	%	±%
Labor	Paul Hoolihan	14,841	52.6	+1.1
Liberal National	Steve McKenna	11,118	39.4	+3.5
Greens	Paul Bambrick	2,267	8.0	+5.1
Total formal votes		28,226	98.0	
Informal votes		533	2.0	
Turnout		28,759	92.4	
Two-party-preferred result
Labor	Paul Hoolihan	15,674	57.6	−0.5
Liberal National	Steve McKenna	11,527	42.4	+0.5
Labor hold		Swing	−0.5	

2006 Queensland state election: Keppel
Party	Candidate	Votes	%	±%
Labor	Paul Hoolihan	12,305	50.1	+3.6
National	Mary Carroll	8,905	36.3	−2.1
Family First	Scott Kilpatrick	2,111	8.6	+8.6
Greens	John McKeon	764	3.1	+3.1
Independent	Peter Draper	243	1.0	+1.0
Independent	Judy Canales	123	0.5	+0.5
Independent	Valle Checa	96	0.4	+0.4
Total formal votes		24,547	98.2	+0.1
Informal votes		441	1.8	−0.1
Turnout		24,988	92.4	+0.3
Two-party-preferred result
Labor	Paul Hoolihan	13,088	57.2	+3.4
National	Mary Carroll	9,797	42.8	−3.4
Labor hold		Swing	+3.4	

2004 Queensland state election: Keppel
Party	Candidate	Votes	%	±%
Labor	Paul Hoolihan	10,632	46.5	+3.5
National	Neil Fisher	8,771	38.4	−4.6
One Nation	Herb Clarke	1,822	8.0	+8.0
Democrats	Naomi Johns	943	4.1	+4.1
Independent	John Murphy	377	1.6	+1.6
Independent	Bruce Piggott	308	1.3	+1.3
Total formal votes		22,853	98.1	−0.1
Informal votes		447	1.9	+0.1
Turnout		23,300	92.1	−0.9
Two-party-preferred result
Labor	Paul Hoolihan	11,292	53.8	+5.3
National	Neil Fisher	9,706	46.2	−5.3
Labor gain from National		Swing	+5.3	

2001 Queensland state election: Keppel
Party	Candidate	Votes	%	±%
National	Vince Lester	9,285	43.0	+11.6
Labor	Paul Hoolihan	9,285	43.0	+12.9
City Country Alliance	Glenda Mather	3,030	14.0	+14.0
Total formal votes		21,596	98.2	
Informal votes		404	1.8	
Turnout		22,000	93.0	
Two-party-preferred result
National	Vince Lester	10,198	51.5	−2.7
Labor	Paul Hoolihan	9,620	48.5	+2.7
National hold		Swing	−2.7	

=== Elections in the 1990s ===
1998 Queensland state election: Keppel
Party	Candidate	Votes	%	±%
Labor	Bruce Saunders	8,134	32.0	−4.4
National	Vince Lester	7,582	29.8	−27.5
One Nation	Wendy McFarlane	5,430	21.3	+21.3
Independent	Glenda Mather	1,679	6.6	+6.6
Australia First	Rick Nagle	1,217	4.8	+4.8
Independent	Toni Hansen	849	3.3	+3.3
Democrats	Terry Clark	546	2.1	+2.1
Total formal votes		25,437	98.8	−0.1
Informal votes		312	1.2	+0.1
Turnout		25,749	93.7	+1.1
Two-party-preferred result
National	Vince Lester	11,932	53.6	−6.7
Labor	Bruce Saunders	10,330	46.4	+6.7
National hold		Swing	−6.7	

1995 Queensland state election: Keppel
Party	Candidate	Votes	%	±%
National	Vince Lester	13,543	57.3	+17.5
Labor	Bruce Saunders	8,589	36.4	−5.2
Greens	Bob Muir	1,483	6.3	+6.3
Total formal votes		23,615	98.9	+0.6
Informal votes		264	1.1	−0.6
Turnout		23,879	92.6	
Two-party-preferred result
National	Vince Lester	14,051	60.3	+8.9
Labor	Bruce Saunders	9,233	39.7	−8.9
National hold		Swing	+8.9	

1992 Queensland state election: Keppel
Party	Candidate	Votes	%	±%
Labor	Rob Schwarten	9,212	41.5	−6.1
National	Vince Lester	8,831	39.8	+3.8
Democrats	Glenmary Swan	1,424	6.4	+6.4
Liberal	Kim Shields	1,100	5.0	−3.2
Confederate Action	Leo Black	1,091	4.9	+4.9
Independent	Chris Hooper	517	2.3	+2.3
Total formal votes		22,175	98.3	
Informal votes		386	1.7	
Turnout		22,561	93.4	
Two-party-preferred result
National	Vince Lester	10,763	51.4	+4.7
Labor	Rob Schwarten	10,171	48.6	−4.7
National gain from Labor		Swing	+4.7	

=== Elections in the 1950s ===
1957 Queensland state election: Keppel
Party	Candidate	Votes	%	±%
Labor	Merv Thackeray	3,730	30.9	−27.6
Queensland Labor	Viv Cooper	3,151	26.1	+26.1
Liberal	Tom Griffith	3,063	25.3	−16.2
Independent	Rex Pilbeam	2,139	17.7	+17.7
Total formal votes		12,083	99.5	+0.3
Informal votes		58	0.5	−0.3
Turnout		12,141	96.2	+0.4
Labor hold		Swing	−4.3	

1956 Queensland state election: Keppel
Party	Candidate	Votes	%	±%
Labor	Viv Cooper	6,790	58.5	+3.1
Liberal	Tom Griffith	4,820	41.5	+41.5
Total formal votes		11,610	99.2	+0.2
Informal votes		88	0.8	−0.2
Turnout		11,698	95.8	+0.1
Labor hold		Swing	N/A	

1953 Queensland state election: Keppel
Party	Candidate	Votes	%	±%
Labor	Viv Cooper	5,850	55.4	−0.7
Country	Alfred Ganter	4,001	37.9	−6.0
Independent	Tolstoy Birkbeck	703	6.7	+6.7
Total formal votes		10,554	99.0	−0.3
Informal votes		111	1.0	+0.3
Turnout		10,665	95.7	+1.7
Labor hold		Swing	+3.3	

1950 Queensland state election: Keppel
Party	Candidate	Votes	%	±%
Labor	Walter Ingram	5,251	56.1	
Country	Harry Beak	4,112	43.9	
Total formal votes		9,363	99.3	
Informal votes		70	0.7	
Turnout		9,433	94.0	
Labor hold		Swing		

=== Elections in the 1940s ===
1947 Queensland state election: Keppel
Party	Candidate	Votes	%	±%
Labor	Walter Ingram	3,593	41.2	+1.1
Country	John Reid	3,422	39.2	+8.2
Frank Barnes Labor	John Harding	1,717	19.7	+19.7
Total formal votes		8,732	98.9	+3.9
Informal votes		93	1.1	−3.9
Turnout		8,825	91.4	+1.3
Labor hold		Swing	−5.2	

1944 Queensland state election: Keppel
Party	Candidate	Votes	%	±%
Labor	Walter Ingram	3,184	40.1	+1.6
Country	Frank Saunders	2,466	31.0	−22.0
Independent	John Harding	2,292	28.9	+28.9
Total formal votes		7,942	95.0	−3.9
Informal votes		420	5.0	+3.9
Turnout		8,362	90.1	+0.1
Labor gain from Country		Swing	+14.3	

1941 Queensland state election: Keppel
Party	Candidate	Votes	%	±%
Country	David Daniel	4,417	53.0	−1.2
Labor	Walter Ingram	3,206	38.5	+38.5
Independent	Ezra Shorley	714	8.6	+8.6
Total formal votes		8,337	98.9	+0.2
Informal votes		90	1.1	−0.2
Turnout		8,427	90.0	−2.3
Country hold		Swing	N/A	

=== Elections in the 1930s ===
1938 Queensland state election: Keppel
Party	Candidate	Votes	%	±%
Country	David Daniel	4,391	54.2	+4.8
Social Credit	John Harding	2,484	30.7	+13.1
Independent	John Salmon	1,227	15.1	+15.1
Total formal votes		8,102	98.7	−0.1
Informal votes		125	1.3	+0.1
Turnout		8,227	92.3	−3.0
Country hold		Swing	N/A	

- Preferences were not distributed.

1935 Queensland state election: Keppel
Party	Candidate	Votes	%	±%
CPNP	Owen Daniel	3,913	49.4	
Labor	Albert Pascoe	2,622	33.1	
Social Credit	John Harding	1,392	17.6	
Total formal votes		7,927	98.8	
Informal votes		95	1.2	
Turnout		8,022	95.3	
Two-party-preferred result
CPNP	Owen Daniel	4,195	59.0	
Labor	Albert Pascoe	2,918	41.0	
CPNP hold		Swing		

1932 Queensland state election: Keppel
Party	Candidate	Votes	%	±%
CPNP	Owen Daniel	3,839	51.6	
Labor	William Clayton	3,653	48.4	
Total formal votes		7,443	98.8	
Informal votes		92	1.2	
Turnout		7,535	95.6	
CPNP hold		Swing		

=== Elections in the 1920s ===
1929 Queensland state election: Keppel
Party	Candidate	Votes	%	±%
CPNP	Owen Daniel	3,347	57.0	+15.2
Labor	James Larcombe	2,527	43.0	−15.2
Total formal votes		5,874	98.6	−0.3
Informal votes		83	1.4	+0.3
Turnout		5,957		
CPNP gain from Labor		Swing	+15.2	

1926 Queensland state election: Keppel
Party	Candidate	Votes	%	±%
Labor	James Larcombe	3,351	58.2	−2.5
CPNP	Ernest Larcombe	2,404	41.8	+2.5
Total formal votes		5,755	98.9	−0.1
Informal votes		65	1.1	+0.1
Turnout		5,820	92.2	+6.4
Labor hold		Swing	−2.5	

1923 Queensland state election: Keppel
Party	Candidate	Votes	%	±%
Labor	James Larcombe	3,270	60.7	+6.4
United	Roderick Haylock	2,120	39.3	−6.4
Total formal votes		5,390	99.0	−0.1
Informal votes		54	1.0	+0.1
Turnout		5,444	85.8	+2.4
Labor hold		Swing	+6.4	

1920 Queensland state election: Keppel
Party	Candidate	Votes	%	±%
Labor	James Larcombe	2,200	54.3	−3.5
National	Robert Hartley	1,851	45.7	+3.5
Total formal votes		4,051	99.1	+0.5
Informal votes		38	0.9	−0.5
Turnout		4,089	83.4	−0.1
Labor hold		Swing	−3.5	

=== Elections in the 1910s ===
1918 Queensland state election: Keppel
Party	Candidate	Votes	%	±%
Labor	James Larcombe	2,067	57.8	−9.6
National	William Thompson	1,512	42.2	+9.6
Total formal votes		3,579	98.6	+0.1
Informal votes		49	1.4	−0.1
Turnout		3,628	83.5	−3.3
Labor hold		Swing	−9.6	

1915 Queensland state election: Keppel
Party	Candidate	Votes	%	±%
Labor	James Larcombe	2,169	67.4	+17.4
Liberal	Leopold Landsberg	1,050	32.6	−11.7
Total formal votes		3,219	98.5	+0.3
Informal votes		50	1.5	−0.3
Turnout		3,269	86.8	+12.2
Labor hold		Swing	+15.0	

1912 Queensland state election: Keppel
Party	Candidate	Votes	%	±%
Labor	James Larcombe	1,432	50.0	
Liberal	James Brennan	1,269	44.3	
Independent Liberal	Frank Lennon	164	5.7	
Total formal votes		2,865	98.2	
Informal votes		52	1.8	
Turnout		2,917	74.6	
Two-party-preferred result
Labor	James Larcombe	1,448	52.4	
Liberal	James Brennan	1,313	47.6	
Labor gain from Liberal		Swing		
