= John Linnett =

John Linnett may refer to:

- John Linnett (politician), member of the Queensland Legislative Assembly
- John Barnes Linnett, British lithograph printer
- Jack Linnett (John Wilfrid Linnett), vice-chancellor at the University of Cambridge
