= Linnett =

Linnett is a surname. Notable people with the surname include:

- John Linnett (politician) (1859–1902), member of the Queensland Legislative Assembly
- John Wilfrid Linnett (1913–1975), chemist
- John Barnes Linnett, nineteenth century printer
- Kane Linnett (born 1989), Australian rugby league footballer
