= Will Crompton =

Australian poet (1865–1911)

William Charles Crompton (1865–1911) was an Australian poet.

Crompton was born in Maryborough, Queensland in 1865.

After growing up and being educated in his hometown, Crompton was elected as an alderman on the Maryborough Municipal Council in September 1893.

Throughout the 1890s, Crompton became known locally for writing his own original poetry which was regularly published in local newspaper, Maryborough Chronicle, Wide Bay and Burnett Advertiser.

In 1894, he commercially published his best known work, Convict Jim and other poems which received mixed reviews.

Following his defeat at the Maryborough Municipal Council elections in 1898 Crompton moved to Rockhampton, Queensland.

Despite moving to Rockhampton, he continued to submit poetry to The Maryborough Chronicle.

Crompton died in December 1911, at the age of 45 after suffering a brain hemorrhage following a workplace accident at Wilson, Hart & Co's Rockhampton timber yard where he was employed as a foreman.

He is buried in the South Rockhampton Cemetery.
