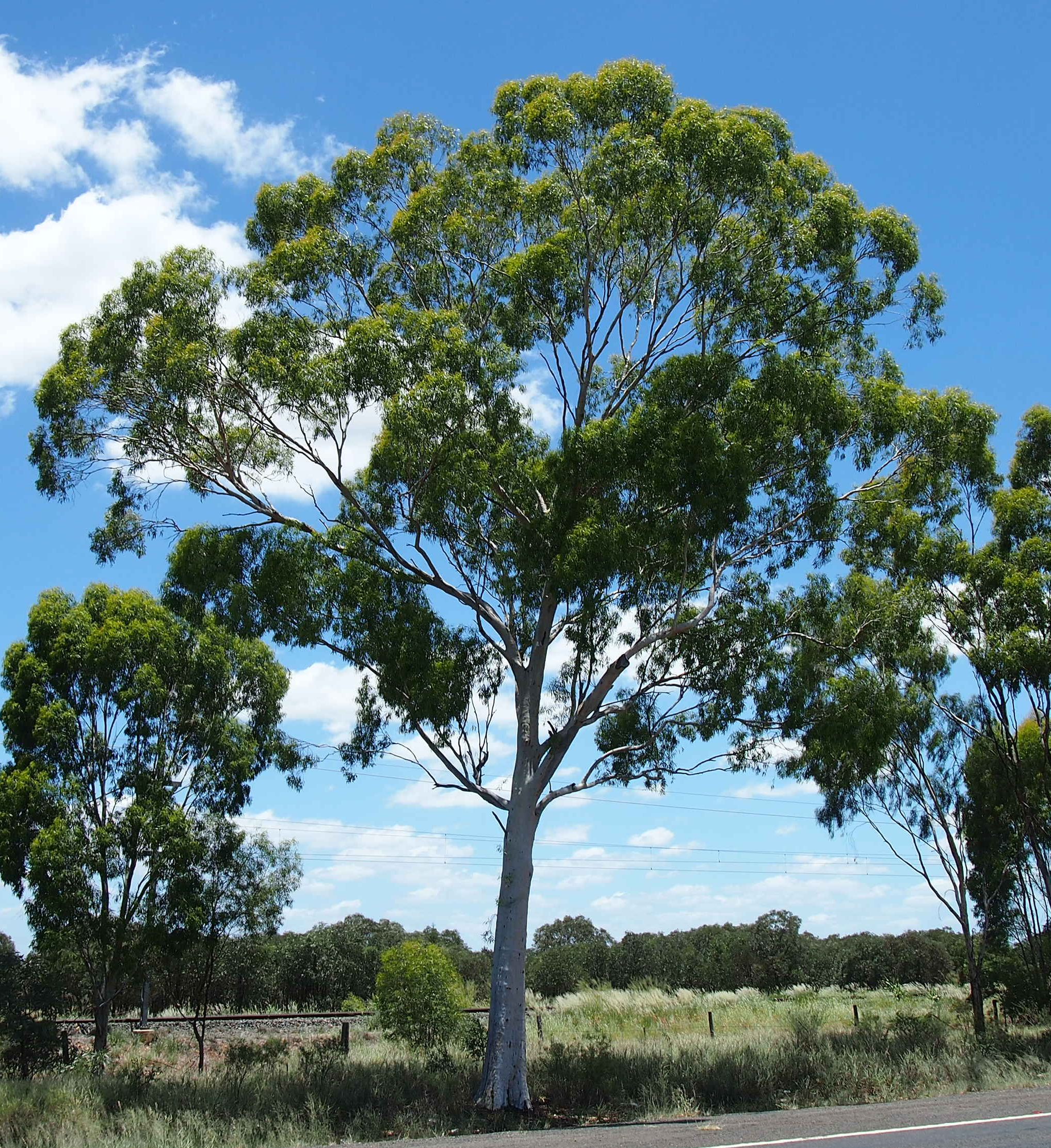
- Eucalyptus thozetiana near Emerald

Conservation status
- Near Threatened (IUCN 3.1)

Scientific classification
- Kingdom: Plantae
- Clade: Tracheophytes
- Clade: Angiosperms
- Clade: Eudicots
- Clade: Rosids
- Order: Myrtales
- Family: Myrtaceae
- Genus: Eucalyptus
- Species: E. thozetiana

Binomial name
- Eucalyptus thozetiana (F.Muell. ex Maiden) R.T.Baker

Synonyms
- Eucalyptus calycogona var. thozetiana F.Muell. ex Maiden; Eucalyptus gracilis var. thozetii F.M.Bailey nom. inval., nom. nud.

= Eucalyptus thozetiana =

Species of eucalyptus

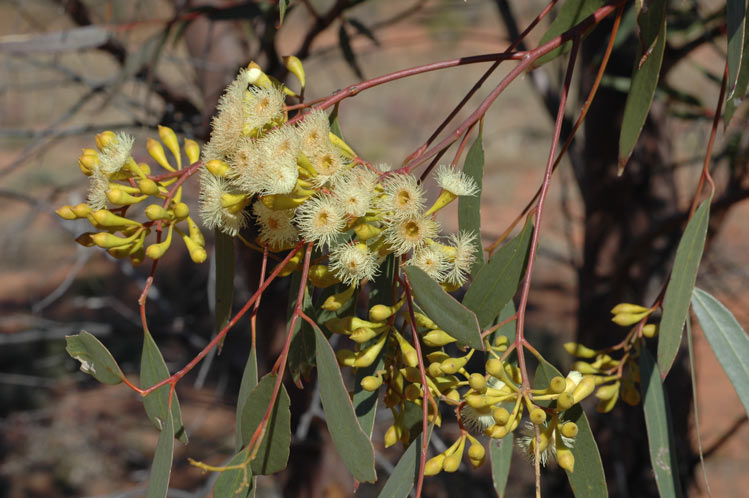
Flower buds and flowers

Eucalyptus thozetiana is a species of tree that is native to inland north-eastern Australia. It has smooth bark, or sometimes with rough bark near the base, linear to lance-shaped adult leaves, flower buds in groups of between seven and eleven, white flowers and urn-shaped, barrel-shaped or cylindrical fruit.

== Description ==
Eucalyptus thozetiana is a tree that typically grows to a height of 17 m (56 ft) and forms a lignotuber. It has smooth creamy white and greyish bark, sometimes with rough, blackish bark near the base and sometimes with small flakes of old bark in patches on the trunk. Young plants and coppice regrowth have stems that are square in cross-section and linear leaves that are 35–160 mm (1.4–6.3 in) long and 3–5 mm (0.12–0.20 in) wide. Adult leaves are the same shade of glossy green on both sides, linear to lance-shaped, 50–140 mm (2.0–5.5 in) long and 5–15 mm (0.20–0.59 in) wide, tapering to a petiole 2–15 mm (0.079–0.591 in) long. The flower buds are mostly arranged on the ends of branchlets in groups of seven, nine or eleven on a thin, branching peduncle 2–15 mm (0.079–0.591 in) long, the individual buds on pedicels 2–5 mm (0.079–0.197 in) long. Mature buds are pear-shaped to oval, 4–6 mm (0.16–0.24 in) long and 2–4 mm (0.079–0.157 in) wide with a rounded, conical or beaked operculum. Flowering occurs from March to November and the flowers are white. The fruit is a woody urn-shaped, barrel-shaped or cylindrical capsule 3–5 mm (0.12–0.20 in) long and 3–45 mm (0.12–1.77 in) wide with the valves enclosed below the rim.

== Taxonomy and naming ==
In his book Eucalyptographia of 1883, under the heading "Eucalyptus gracilis", Ferdinand von Mueller noted -

Either as a variety or perhaps even as a species can be distinguished from E. gracilis as Eucalyptus gathered by the lamented late Monsieur A. Thozet in his last botanical journey to Expedition-Range, during which he became a victim of the paludal fever, to which this excellent man so sadly succumbed. This Eucalyptus, which should bear his name, can be distinguished by its longer leaves, narrow-ellipsoid flowerbuds, smaller, not or less conspicuously angular calyces and also smaller and narrower fruit, irrespective of the size of the tree, which rises to a height of 60 feet, according to Mr. E. Bowman and Mr. P. O'Shanesy, who noticed it near the Mackenzie- and Comet-River.

In 1903, Joseph Maiden based a description of Eucalyptus calycogona var. thozetiana on Mueller's excerpt in his book, A Critical Revision of the Genus Eucalyptus.

In 1906, Richard Thomas Baker raised the variety to species status as Eucalyptus thozetiana in Proceedings of the Linnean Society of New South Wales. The specific epithet honours Anthelme Thozet.

== Distribution and habitat ==
Eucalyptus thozetiana usually grows on sandy soils in woodland and open forest. It is widespread between Emerald, Junda and the Darling Downs in Queensland and near Arltunga in the south of the Northern Territory.

== Conservation status ==
This eucalypt is classified as "least concern" under the Queensland Government Nature Conservation Act 1992, and as "near threatened" in the Northern Territory. The IUCN Red List assesses the species as Near Threatened.

== See also ==
- List of Eucalyptus species
