= Anthelme Thozet =

Australian botanist (1826–1878)

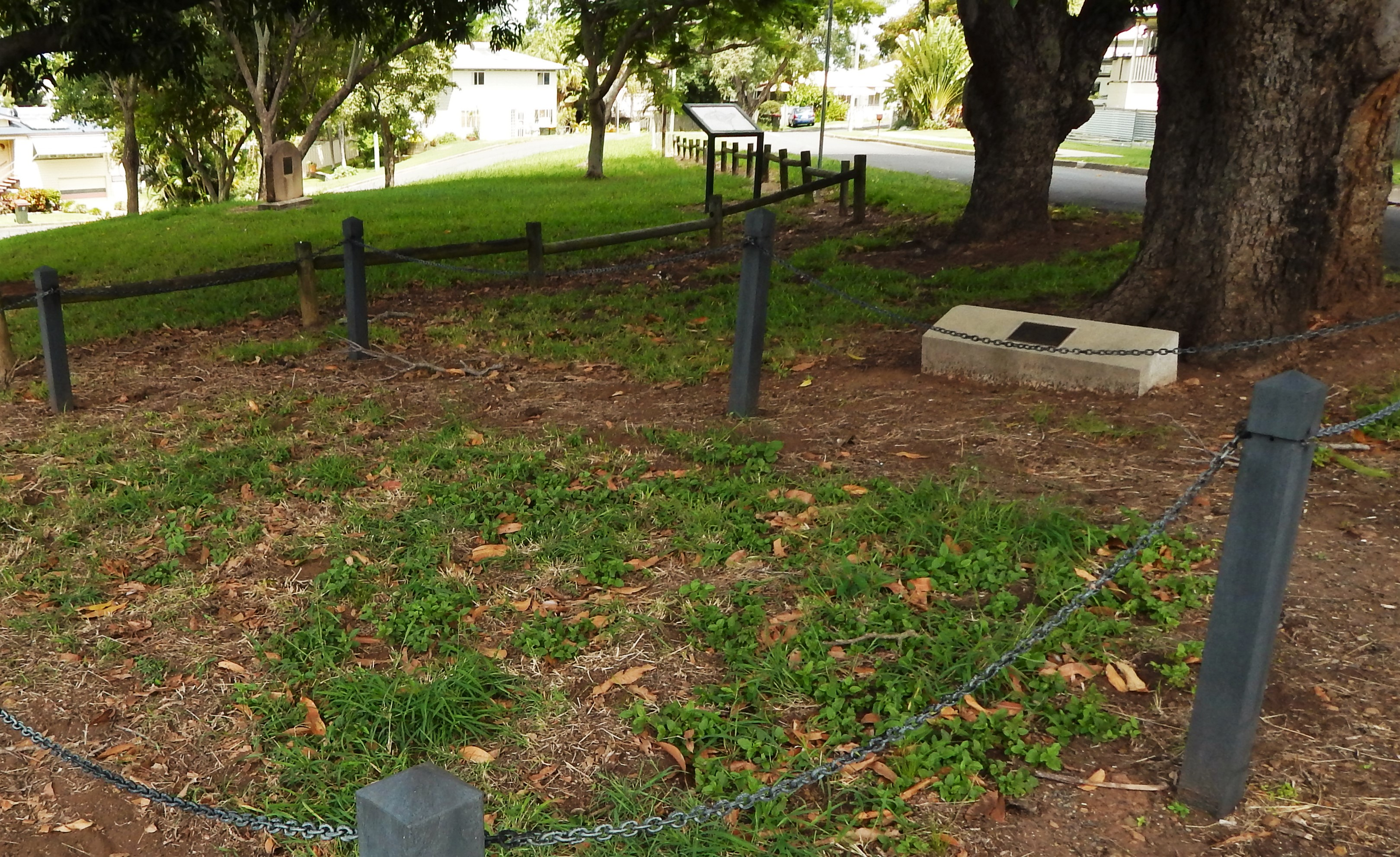
- The Thozet graves in Koongal, 2022
- Born: May 25, 1826; Cheignieu-la-Balme, Ain, France
- Died: May 31, 1878 (aged 52); Rockhampton, Queensland, Australia
- Burial place: "Muellerville" (Norris Park), Koongal, Queensland, Australia; 23.3681°S 150.5456°E
- Monuments: Thozet Road, Thozet Creek, Thozet Building, Frenchmans Creek, Frenchville, Muellerville Walk, historical markers
- Occupations: botanist, ethnographer, hotelier
- Years active: 1854-1878
- Known for: Rockhampton Botanic Gardens, "Muellerville"
- Notable work: Notes on Some of the Roots, Tubers, Bulbs and Fruits Used as Vegetable Food by the Aboriginals of Northern Queensland, Australia (1866)
- Spouse: Maria Thozet (m. 1872)
- Children: 1
- Website: www.thozet.com

Anthelme Thozet (25 May 1826 – 31 May 1878) was a French-Australian botanist and ethnographer.

== Early life ==
He was born 25 May 1826 in Chegnieu-la-Balme (Register of Contrevoz), and fled Calais for London (giving his profession as engineer) in September 1854 as a political refugee following the 1848 French revolution. He migrated to New South Wales Australia in late 1854/early 1855 as part of a French gold digging expedition to Bathurst. He then moved to Sydney in early 1856 where he worked as a clerk at the Royal Botanic Gardens, Sydney before being drawn to Rockhampton, Queensland by the Canoona gold rush. While living in Sydney he met Maria Isabella Berthold, a German immigrant, and they had a son, Auguste who was born on 7 July 1857.

== Life in Rockhampton ==
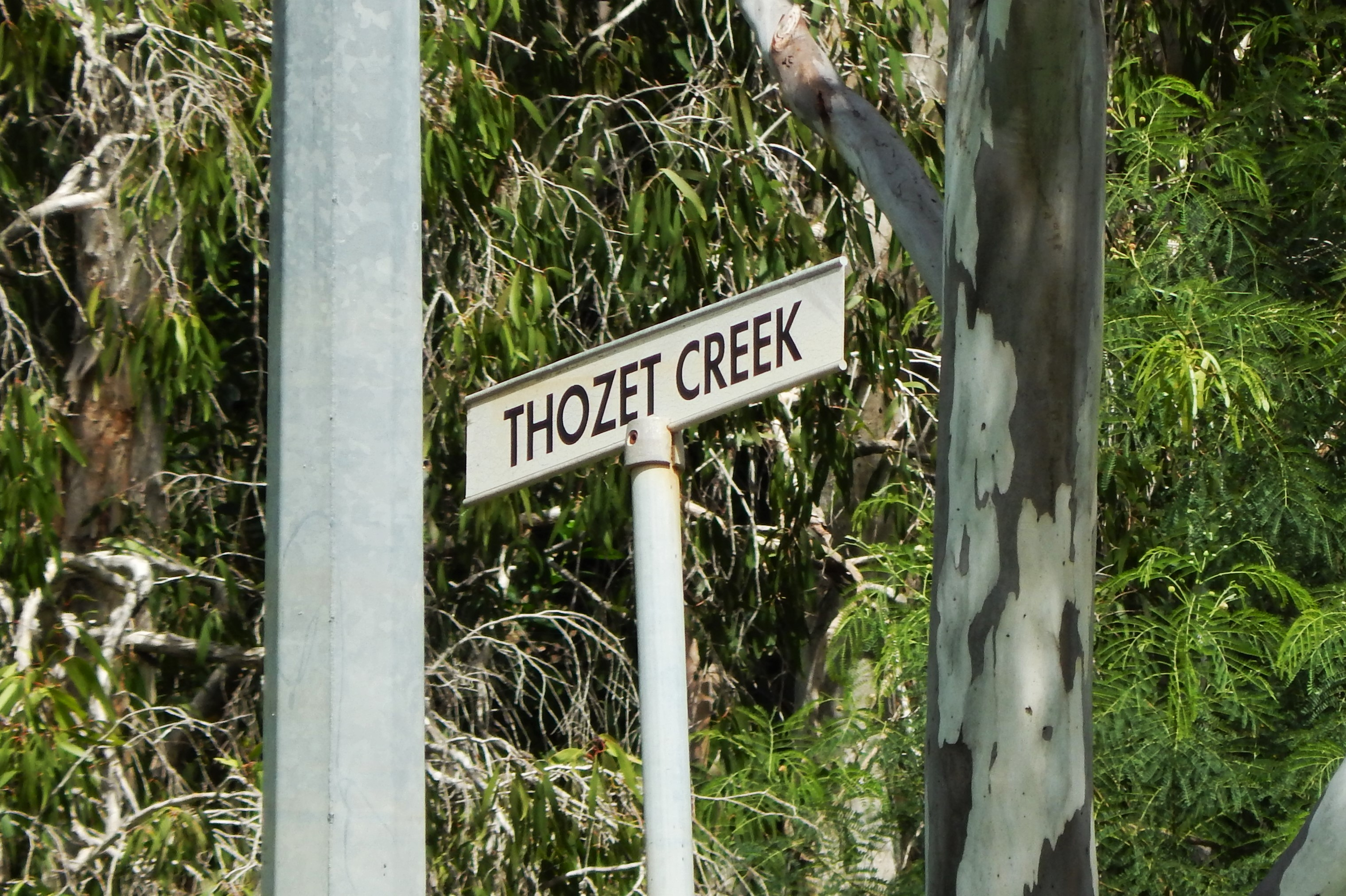
Thozet Creek sign, 2022

Thozet established the second hotel in Rockhampton, the Alliance, but driven by a never failing professional interest in botany he commenced researching native Australian plants used by Indigenous peoples of Northern Queensland, Australia including the Darumbal clans around Rockhampton.

Thozet is credited with pioneering research into bush tucker. In 1866 he published Notes on Some of the Roots, Tubers, Bulbs and Fruits Used as Vegetable Food by the Aboriginals of Northern Queensland, Australia, W H Buzacott, Rockhampton. This pamphlet includes a description of midamo, a mixture of mangrove roots and berries made by baking the root of the common mangrove (Avicennia Tomentosa) called Egaie by the tribes of Cleveland Bay, and Tagon–Tagon by those of Rockhampton.

Thozet established his own plant nursery in North Rockhampton on 70 acres (280,000 m^{2}) which are today bounded by Thozet Creek, Thozet Road, Rockonia Road and the Fitzroy River in Koongal.

Thozet was instrumental in developing the Rockhampton Botanic Gardens founded in 1861, the South Rockhampton Cemetery, and the tree plantings along the Fitzroy River in the Rockhampton CBD area. He supplied plant and seed specimens to other botanists and Botanical Gardens, including Ferdinand von Mueller, Victorian government botanist and director of the Royal Botanic Gardens, Melbourne. Thozet named his sprawling 66-acre Rockhampton property "Muellerville" in honour of von Mueller.

In 1875, he was made a fellow of the Royal Colonial Institute.

The website Bionomia shows that the specimens he collected continue to contribute to scientific knowledge with (as of June 2020) six publications having used his specimens.

In 2011, there was some suggestion that Thozet may have planted Australia's first mango trees on "Muellerville", sourcing them from explorer Charles Nicholson who may have picked them up as seedlings in India. However, this claim has been disputed.

Thozet was active in promoting the interests of Rockhampton overseas, and in the Separation League, attempting to have the northern portion of Queensland recognised as a separate State. The family travelled overseas between 1869 1872 which included an extended stay in France where Thozet gave lectures and raised more money to continue his research. They also visited England where Anthelme and Maria were married in a Surrey registry office on 22 November 1872. By March 1873, they had arrived back in Rockhampton.

== Awards ==
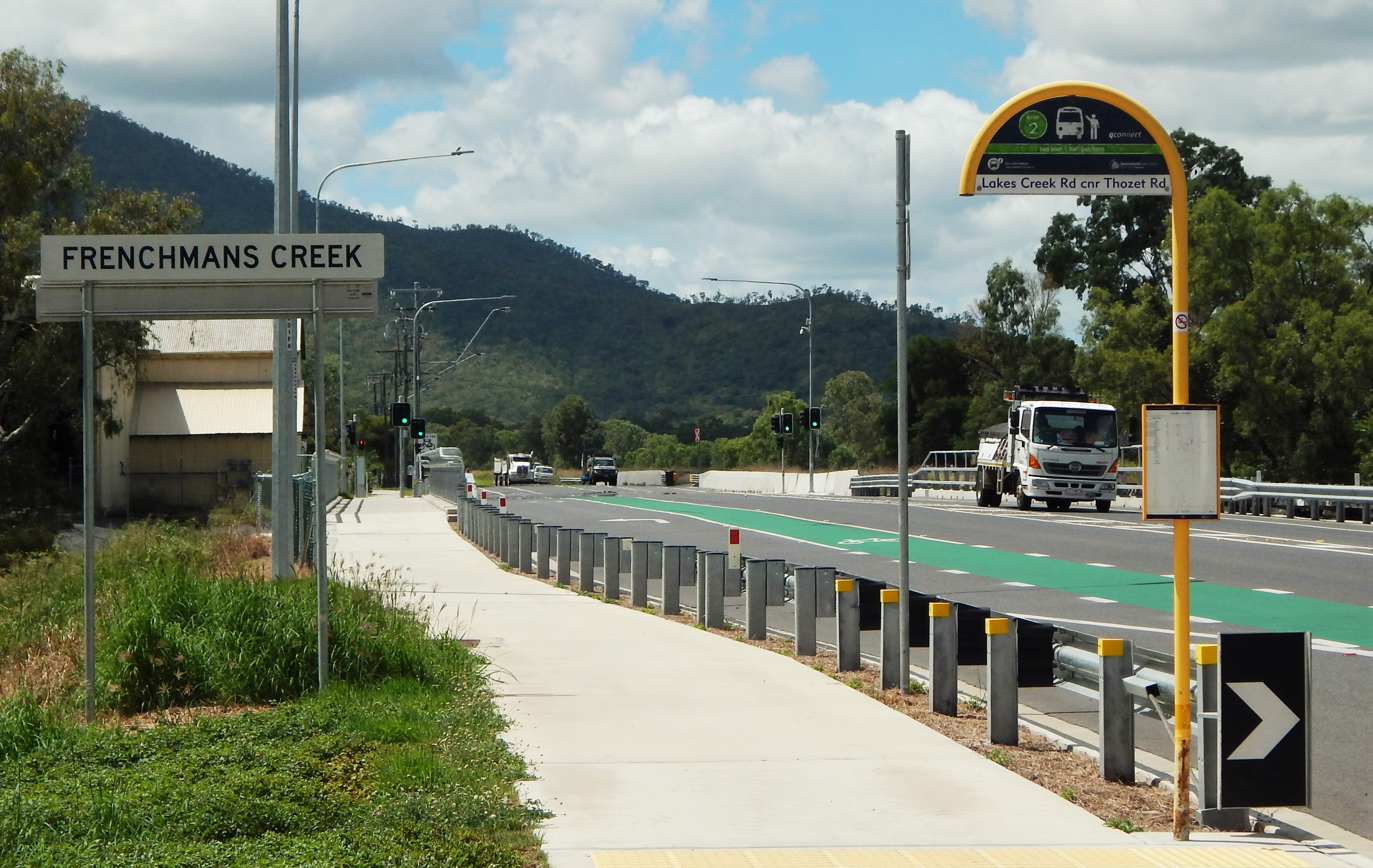
Frenchmans Creek crossing, 2022

Thozet was awarded numerous medals throughout his career.

At the 1862 International Exhibition in London, Thozet received silver medals for his exhibits on tobacco grown and cigars manufactured in Rockhampton. He was awarded silver medals at the 1862 Lyon International Exhibition, the 1865 Royal Prussian Exhibition in Berlin, and the 1875 Society d'Acclimatisation in Paris.

Thozet also won two bronze medals at the 1866–67 Melbourne Intercolonial Exhibition of Australasia.

In January 1921, Thozet's widow Maria presented a collection of 15 medals to the Rockhampton School of Arts.

In 2012, a private collector presented the collection of medals to Central Queensland University to be displayed in the library at the university's Rockhampton campus. A special morning tea was held to celebrate the university taking custodianship of the medals.

== Death ==
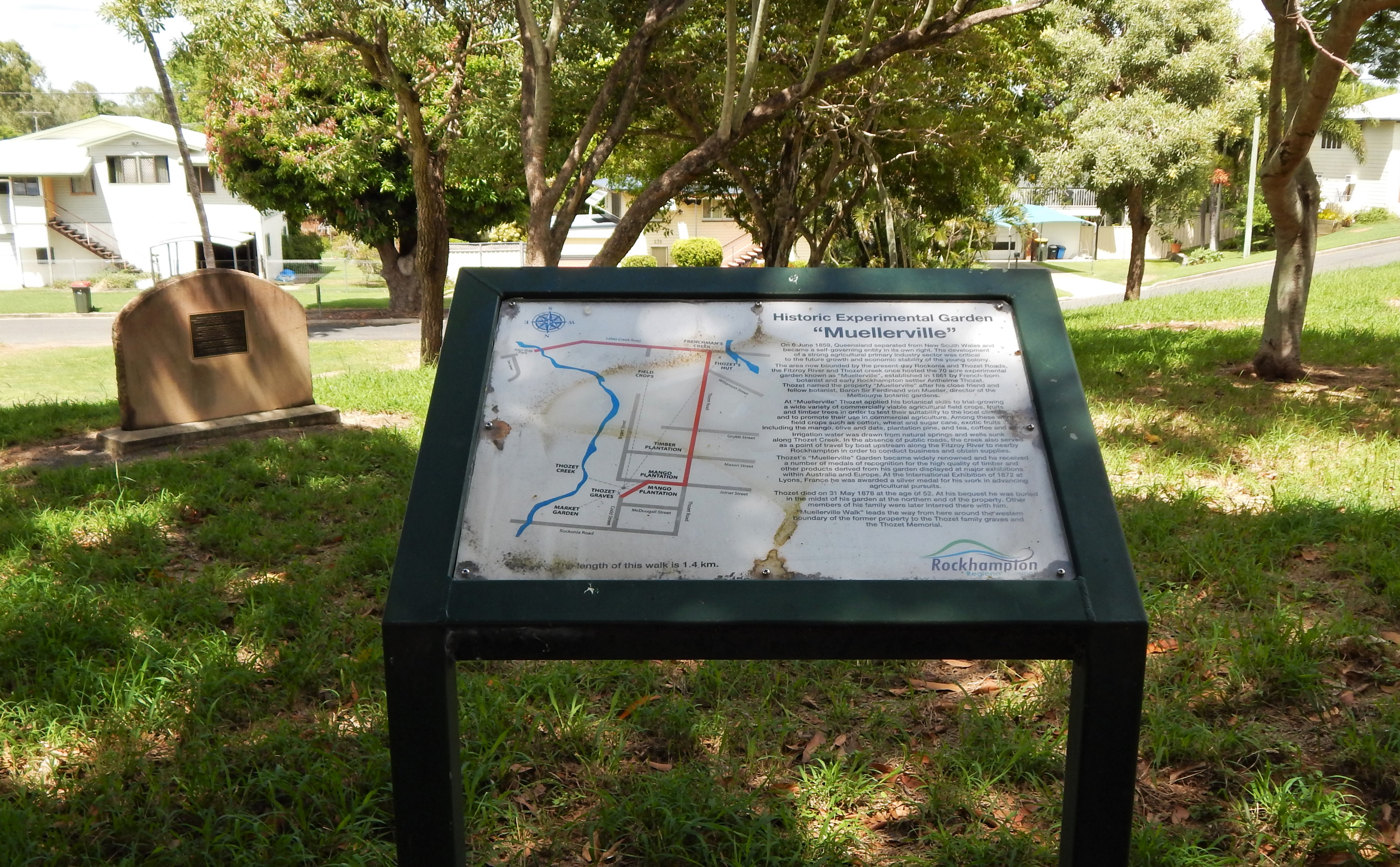
Interpretive signage and a historical marker near the Thozet graves in the Rockhampton suburb of Koongal, 2022

Anthelme Thozet died in 1878 from bilious fever contracted on an expedition to Blackwater and was buried in the garden of his property Muellerville.

Thozet's son Auguste and daughter-in-law Lucy Anne (née Nobbs) were buried beside him in 1902 and this small family cemetery is located on Codd Street, North Rockhampton. Lucy Thozet had died from natural causes on 24 February 1902, with her husband dying from suicide on 11 March 1902.

In December 1922, Anthelme Thozet's widow Maria sustained injuries in a fall at her home where she lay for 13 hours before being found the next morning by her neighbours and then taken to hospital. She never recovered and died on 4 August 1923. Maria Thozet was buried in the North Rockhampton Cemetery despite wanting to be buried the family cemetery on "Muellerville" alongside her husband, son and daughter-in-law.

After Maria Thozet's death, Muellerville was gradually sold off as residential allotments, the first 30 of which went to auction on 31 July 1926. Apart from some parkland, the original Muellerville property is now a completely residential area.

In 2010, Rockhampton Regional Council and the University of Queensland conducted archeological investigations, locating three graves at the north end of Norris Park, which lies on land that was part of the original Muellerville property.

In 2012, there was a push to have Norris Park renamed to Muellerville Park. Situated on Thozet's original Muellerville property, Norris Park was named as such as a tribute to William Norris, a long serving employee of Rockhampton City Council. However, a petition was submitted to the council's parks and recreation committee to have it changed to Muellerville Park in recognition of Thozet's contribution to botany. Although council decided to keep the name Norris Park, they revealed a commemorative stone would be installed in the park to give recognition of Thozet's pioneering work. As a result, the council subsequently installed a new headstone for the graves, and a memorial marker informing visitors that "this parkland is the last remaining portion of the 66 acre experimental garden known as 'Muellerville', once owned by Frenchborn botanist and botanical pioneer Anthelme Thozet".

== Legacy ==
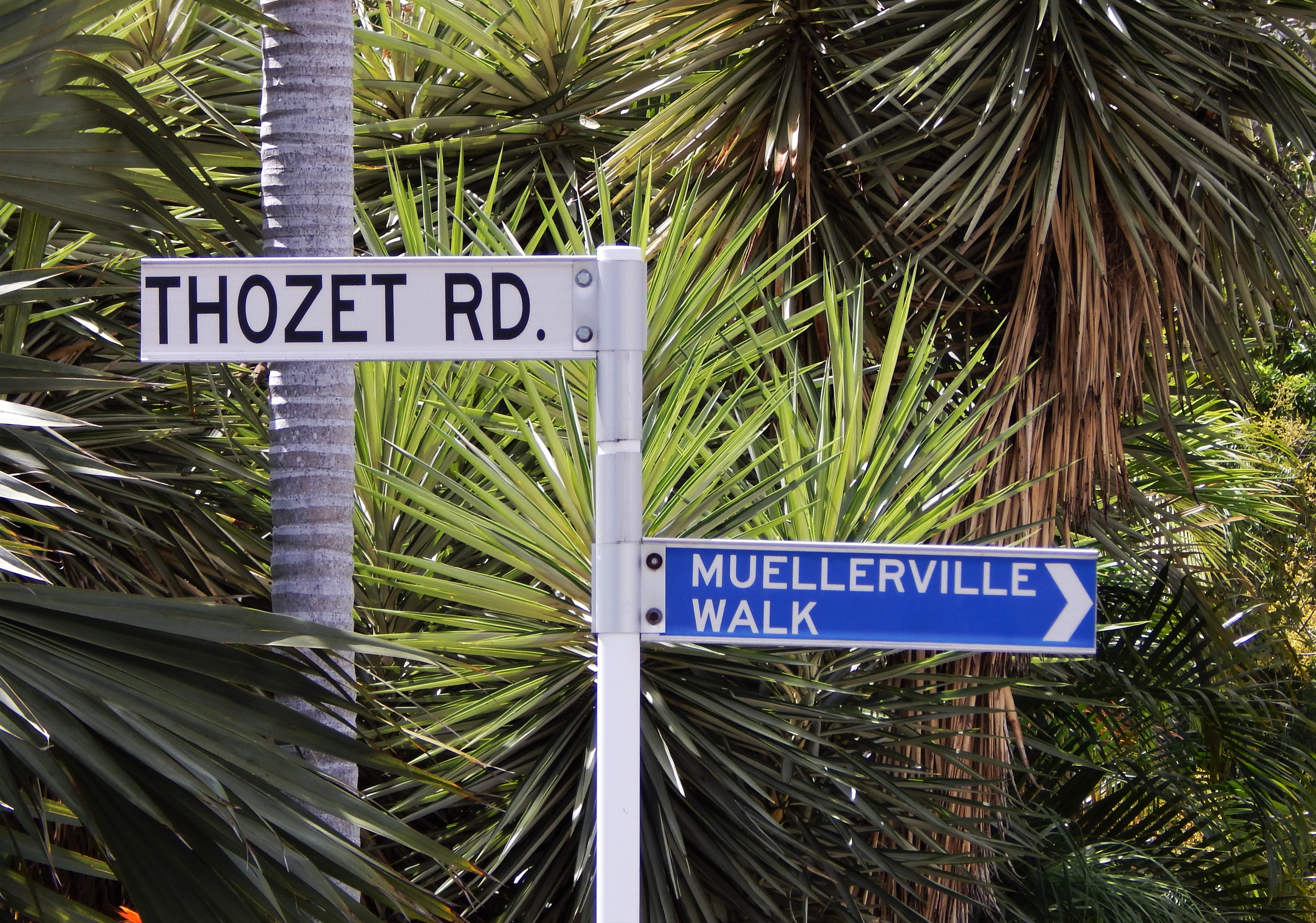
Thozet Road and Muellerville Walk signpost, 2022

No photographs of Thozet are known to exist. There was a pen-and-ink drawing of Thozet which was previously displayed in the Rockhampton School of Arts but as of 2010 its whereabouts were unknown.

However, numerous landmarks in Rockhampton bear Thozet's name or refer to his French heritage such as Thozet Road, Thozet Creek, Little Thozet Creek, Frenchmans Creek and the suburb of Frenchville.

The Rockhampton Historical Society installed a historical marker is located on Quay Street crediting Thozet with planting native plum trees along the banks of the Fitzroy River in 1867 which are still standing.

In 1891, botanist Carl Ernst Otto Kuntze circumscribed a fungal genus in the family Chaetosphaeriaceae and named in Thozet's honour. The tree species, Eucalyptus thozetiana was also named in his honour in 1906.

Muellerville Walk was developed in 2014 to guide visitors around the western boundary of what was once Thozet's vast property, with the starting point being at Thozet's grave in Norris Park. Muellerville Walk was upgraded in 2017 with interpretive signage and a fully connected pathway.

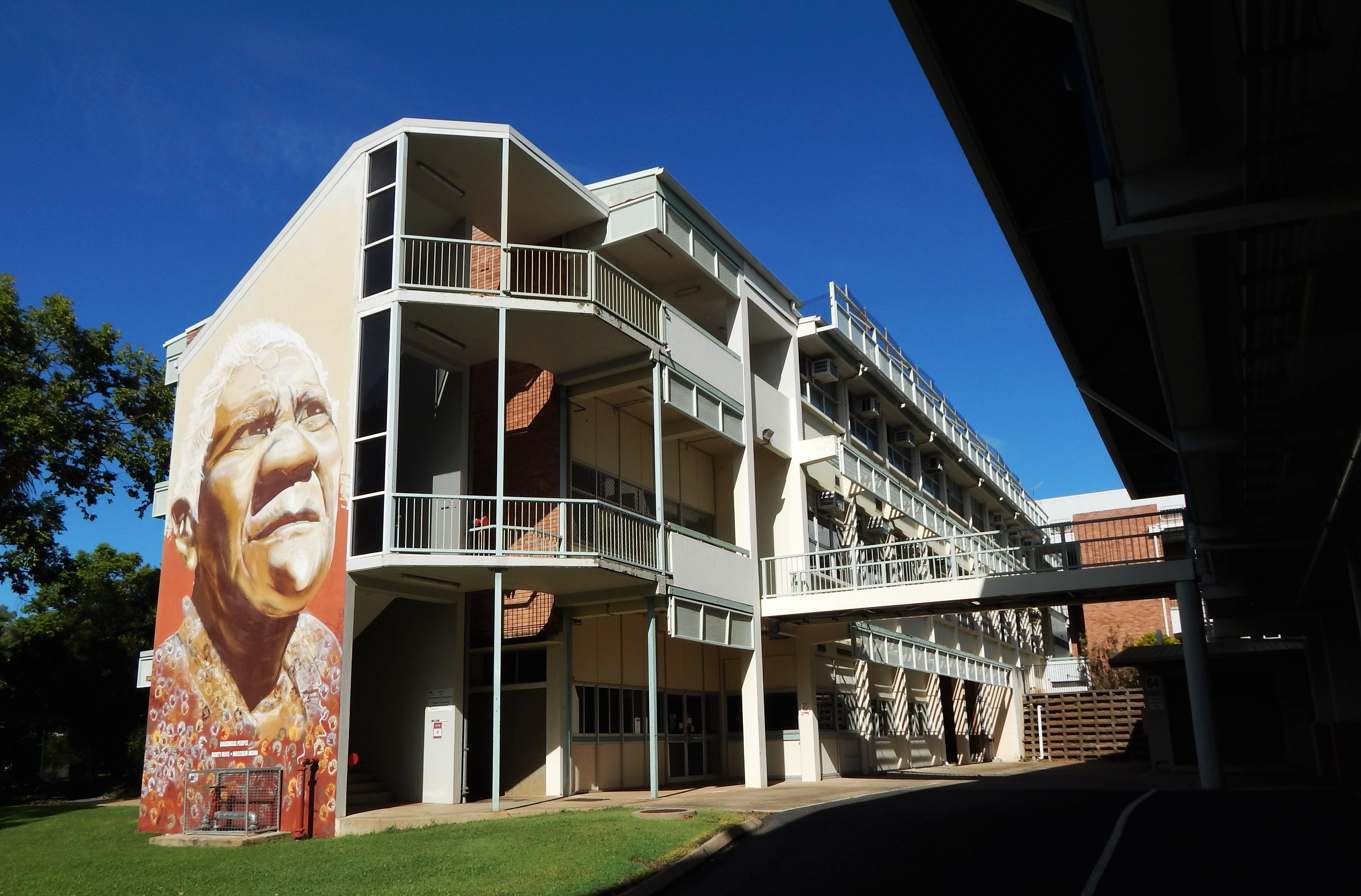
Building 7 at CQUniversity in Rockhampton, which in 2003 was named Thozet Building, 2022

Building 7 on the North Rockhampton campus of Central Queensland University was named the Thozet Building in 2003. The three-storey structure was one of the three original buildings to be constructed on the campus in 1964. With the building housing the Primary Industries Research Centre (Plant Sciences) and the Centre for Environmental Management, it was named the Thozet building on 9 October 2003 in honour of Thozet's outstanding contribution to pioneering plant science and research and in the development of horticulture in Rockhampton and Central Queensland. The building's plaque officially unveiled by Dr Joe Baker. However, The "Thozet Building" signage was removed from the exterior of the building prior to the installation of two murals on the eastern side of the building in 2017. Artists Bill Gannon, Luke Gannon and Jon Watson created murals of Aunty Ollie (a custodian of the Darumbal people) and Malcolm Mann (a Darumbal traditional owner) which were officially unveiled in September 2017. Since then, the building has been simply referred to as "Building 7" in the university's own online articles. In a 2019 online article, the university stated that the structure is "now known as building 7".

In 2019, Thozet's name was short-listed as one of the top three names to be considered for the new riverside art gallery in Rockhampton City. After a period of public consultation, the Rockhampton Museum of Art was chosen as the winning name with 101 votes compared to eight votes received from those who preferred the name of the Thozet Art Gallery.

== See also ==
- French Australian
