= Electoral district of Rockhampton North =

Rockhampton North Queensland—Legislative Assembly
- State: Queensland
- Dates current: 1888–1912, 1960–1992
- Namesake: North Rockhampton

Rockhampton North was an electoral district of the Legislative Assembly in the Australian state of Queensland from 1888 to 1912, and from 1960 to 1992.

It was based on the northern area of Rockhampton. In both incarnations, it was replaced by the district of Keppel.

Rockhampton North was generally a safe seat for the Labor Party. It was one of the eleven seats held by Labor in their "cricket team" caucus after the 1974 election, their worst defeat until 2012.

== Members for Rockhampton North ==
First incarnation (1888–1912)
Member	Party	Term
Rees Jones		1888–1893
William Harding	Independent	1893–1896
James Stewart	Labour	1896–1901
Henry Turner	Labour	1901
John Linnett	Independent	1901–1902
Henry Turner	Labour	1902–1907
James Brennan	Kidstonites	1907–1909
James Brennan	Liberal	1909–1912
Second incarnation 1960–1992
Merv Thackeray	Labor Party	1960–1972
Merv Thackeray	Independent	1972
Les Yewdale	Labor	1972–1989
Robert Schwarten	Labor	1989–1992

== See also ==
- Electoral districts of Queensland
- Members of the Queensland Legislative Assembly by year
- Category:Members of the Queensland Legislative Assembly by name
