= South Rockhampton Cemetery =

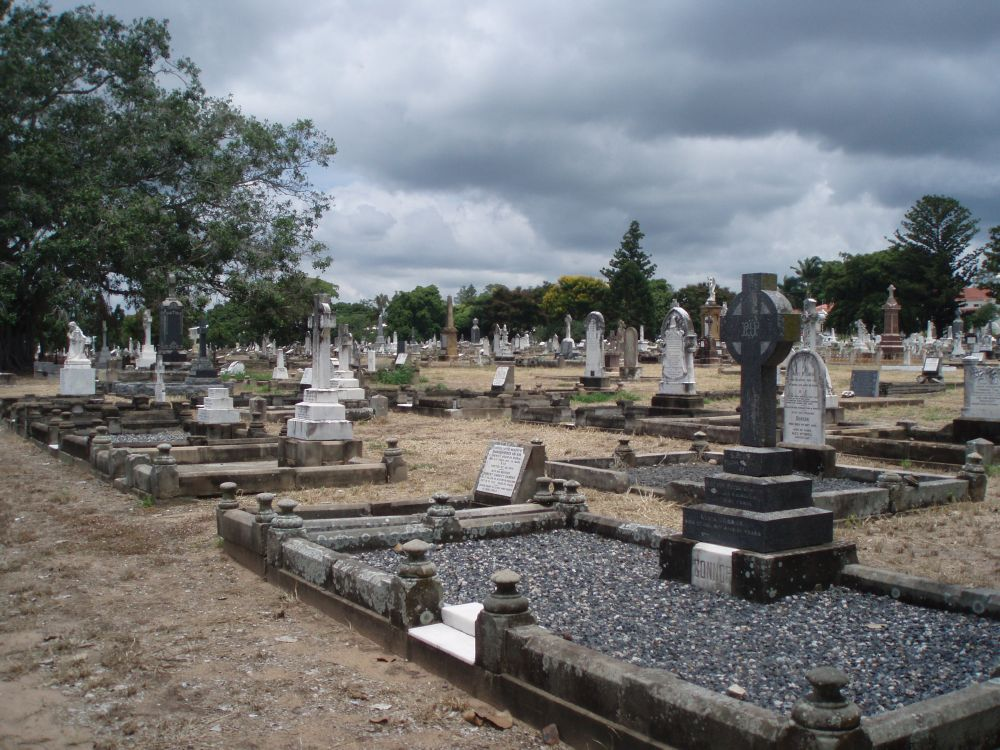
- South Rockhampton Cemetery, 2009

- Location within Queensland Location within Australia
- 23.3988°S 150.5032°E
- Location: Upper Dawson Road, Allenstown, Rockhampton Region, Queensland, Australia

History
- Design period: 1840s–1860s (mid-19th century)
- Built: 1860–1970

Queensland Heritage Register
- Official name: South Rockhampton Cemetery, Dawson Road Cemetery, Rockhampton Cemetery
- Type: state heritage (landscape, built)
- Designated: 15 February 1993
- Reference no.: 601131
- Significant period: 1860 (historical, fabric, social)
- Significant components: denominational divisions, plaque, watercourse – creek, grave marker, headstone, pathway/walkway, cemetery, burial/grave, sculpture, trees/plantings, grave surrounds/railings

South Rockhampton Cemetery is a heritage-listed cemetery at Upper Dawson Road, Allenstown, Rockhampton Region, Queensland, Australia. It was built from 1860 to 1970. It is also known as Dawson Road Cemetery and Rockhampton Cemetery. It was added to the Queensland Heritage Register on 15 February 1993.

== History ==
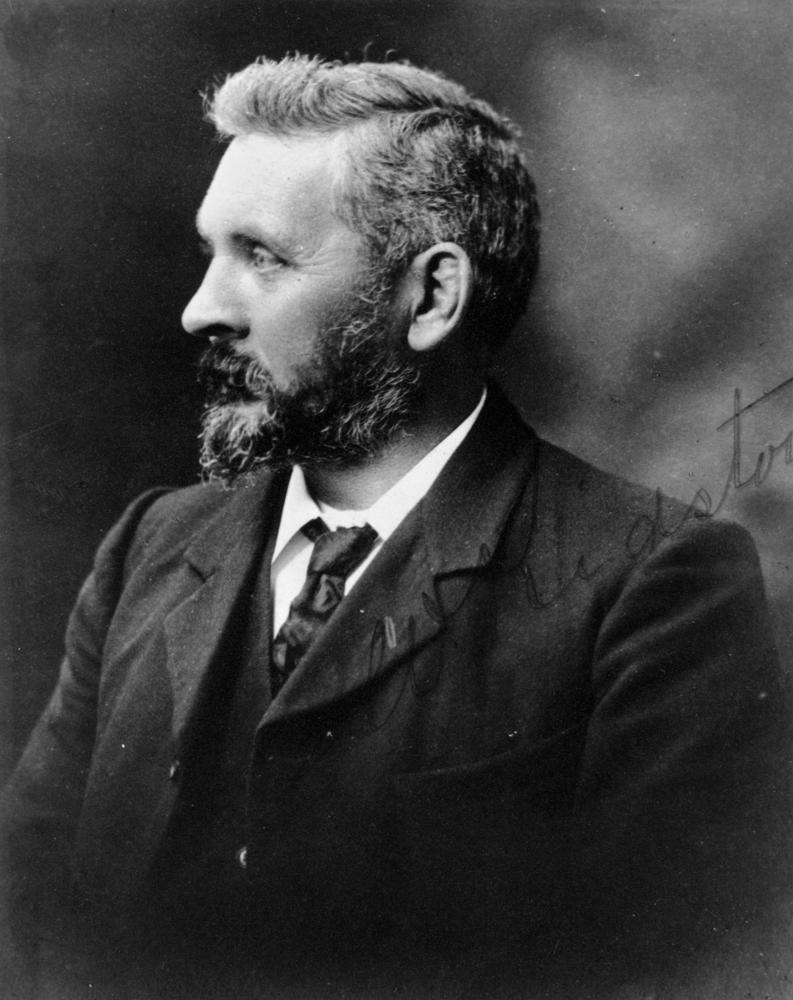
William Kidston, Queensland Premier, is buried in South Rockhampton Cemetery

The South Rockhampton (Dawson Road) Cemetery was surveyed in May 1860 as the town's first official general cemetery, encompassing less than half its present area, and fronting the Dawson (now Lower Dawson) Road. The 1858 Rockhampton town plan had made no provision for a public cemetery and, prior to c. 1860, burials took place near the Fitzroy River, between Albert and North Streets. The Dawson Road cemetery, sited on a principal arterial road out of early Rockhampton, was established when the population numbered less than 1,000, and just five years after the first settlers had arrived in the area in 1855.

Rockhampton grew rapidly in the 1860s. Between 1861 and 1866 immigrant ships filled a desperate labour shortage, and the discovery of gold to the west of Rockhampton enticed large numbers of Europeans, Chinese and southern colonists to the district. The rapid growth of the town into a major regional centre in the 1860s–80s is reflected in the history of its principal 19th century cemetery.

The first burials were in the early 1860s (the oldest surviving headstone is dated 1861). Nominally, burials were supervised by the Rockhampton Municipal Council, but not until 1864 did the Council commence a proper administration of the cemetery. In late 1864/early 1865 they appointed a sexton, formulated cemetery regulations, started a register of burials, laid out the grounds to represent the major religious denominations, and authorised the removal of remains from the old burial ground to the new. In late 1886 trustees were appointed under the 1865 Cemeteries Act. In 1867–68, French botanist Anthelme Thozet donated trees and seeds from his famous Kalka (North Rockhampton) experimental gardens to the cemetery.

Although the cemetery had been in use for over a decade, it was not until 1872 that 3 hectares of the site were officially gazetted as a reserve for cemetery purposes. In 1880 the area was extended to nearly 13 hectares. The reserve then included all of the land bounded by Dawson and Upper Dawson Roads, and Prospect and Ferguson Streets. Prior to 1904 there were no burials west of the present north–south main cemetery path, as the ground was considered too rocky. For the same reason, few graves were dug east of the creek running through the cemetery. The resultant problems of overcrowding and shallow graves were exacerbated in 1900 with the outbreak of bubonic plague in the town.

Later the Rockhampton Cemetery Trust acquired additional land in Norman Gardens, North Rockhampton, and in 1930 the cemetery reserve at South Rockhampton was gazetted as closed, excluding burials in plots purchased prior to 15 May 1930. In 1937 about 1.6 hectares of the reserve fronting the Lower Dawson Road was surrendered for public park purposes, no graves being identified on this site.

In January 1964 the Rockhampton City Council was appointed trustee of the cemetery reserve. Burials ceased c. 1970. On 19 June 1986 the Queensland Governor in Council rescinded the cemetery reserve gazettal, and the site remains as vacant crown land. Neither a c. 1865 sexton's cottage, nor a Chinese incense burner is extant. The wrought iron entry gates and posts, which in 1864 were moved from Rockhampton's recreation ground to the cemetery, have been removed to the Japanese gardens. A New perimeter fence has been erected.

In March 2023, Rockhampton Regional Council expressed their intention to reopen the cemetery for new burials. The council said they planned to undertake a heritage study to develop a new burial plan, at an estimated cost of $600,000 because of their confidence of there being room for new burials, specifically in the southern portion of Lot 1. If reopened, the council believes there is potential for the cemetery to remain open for new burials for a period of up to five years. The council said the cemetery's reopening would not affect its heritage listing.

== Notable burials ==
Over 22,000 persons were buried in the cemetery between 1860 and 1970, including Aboriginal, Chinese, German, Jewish and other ethnic groups, with memorials to sailors, miners, soldiers, members of religious orders, mayors, and many of Rockhampton's early inhabitants. The site survives as a significant reflection of the city's social, political and demographic history.

Notable people buried in the cemetery include:

- John Cani, Roman Catholic Bishop of Rockhampton
- Will Crompton, poet
- Owen Daniel, Member of the Queensland Legislative Assembly
- Sydney Davis, Member of the Queensland Legislative Assembly
- Thomas Dunlop, Member of the Queensland Legislative Assembly
- James Flint, architect and alderman of the Rockhampton Municipal Council
- Thomas Griffin, murderer
- William Harding, Member of the Queensland Legislative Assembly
- William Higson, Member of the Queensland Legislative Assembly
- William Kidston, Member of the Queensland Legislative Assembly, Queensland Premier (1908–11)
- William Frederick Lambert, Member of the Queensland Legislative Council
- James Larcombe, Member of the Queensland Legislative Assembly
- John MacFarlane, Member of the Queensland Legislative Assembly
- Charles Melbourne, Member of the Queensland Legislative Council
- Frank Reid Murphy, Member of the Queensland Legislative Assembly
- Francis Hodgson Nixon, architect and newspaper proprietor and editor
- Edward Palmer, Member of the Queensland Legislative Assembly
- John Palmer, first mayor of Rockhampton
- William Pattison, Member of the Queensland Legislative Assembly, Treasurer of Queensland
- Frederick Shaw, Member of the Queensland Legislative Assembly
- Joseph Shiel, Roman Catholic Bishop of Rockhampton

The cemetery contains two Commonwealth war graves, these being a soldier of the Australian Army from each of the two World Wars.

== Description ==
South Rockhampton Cemetery is located on an easterly slope of The Range and covers the block bounded by Prospect Street, Upper Dawson Road and Ferguson Street with a landscaped park, tourist information centre and service station to the east side along the Bruce Highway.

The cemetery is divided into denominational sections including Church of England, Roman Catholic, Presbyterian, Methodist, Baptist, Congregational, Jewish and non-Judaeo-Christian by a main path leading north to south and a series of minor paths running east to west. There are approximately 2000 surviving headstones throughout these sections and many mounds of earth where graves exist, but the headstones have been removed. The graves form a terracing effect across the site with the exception of the non-Judaeo-Christian section where the burial traditions of the Chinese, Aboriginal and other groups left no visible memorial.

A watercourse runs from the southwest corner through the Church of England section to the eastern perimeter. Some headstones exist within overgrown areas of this watercourse, including the only surviving cast iron headstone. A sandstone ridge surfaces within the watercourse, and a headstone dated 1862 is thought to have been quarried from the sandstone on this site, as it has a different grain and colouring to the local Stanwell sandstone used throughout the rest of the cemetery.

Other types of local stone used include white Ulam marble from south of Rockhampton, black granite from west of Rockhampton and grey granite from near Gracemere. Imported stones include Harcourt granite from Victoria, porphyry from Brisbane, white Italian Carrara marble, pink Italian Rosa Porrino granite, Italian saudo grey granite, Baltic brown granite, Balmoral red granite from Finland and black slate from the Mediterranean.

Most of the stonework has been undertaken locally by firms of monumental masons including Jenkins and Allen, Jenkins, Allen and McKenzie, with individual masons signing their work. There are some examples of pieces which have been imported fully sculptured.

Architectural trends are reflected in some headstones which have Gothic, Classical and Art Nouveau influences. In many cases, grave surrounds are an integral part of the headstone design in creating a piece of sculpture. Labour-intensive practices, particularly in the grave surrounds, seem to have been simplified in the interwar period, with cast concrete posts and curbs becoming common, the detailed carving being confined to the headstone or plaque.

Notable plant species include Banyan trees (Ficus benghalensis) at the north entrance and in the centre, hoop pine (Araucaria cunninghamii) and weeping fig (Ficus benjamina) along the north boundary, Cook Island (Araucaria cookii) and (Livistona drudei) palms to the southeast, and a native almond (Terminala porphyrocarpa sin. T.thozettii), named after A Thozet, which is located to the east. The adjoining landscaped park includes barbecue and playground facilities.

Damage has occurred to some headstones through acts of vandalism, burning off or negligent mowing with stone or concrete surrounds being chipped.

== Heritage listing ==
South Rockhampton Cemetery was listed on the Queensland Heritage Register on 15 February 1993 having satisfied the following criteria.

The place is important in demonstrating the evolution or pattern of Queensland's history.

South Rockhampton Cemetery, established in 1860, is important in demonstrating the evolution of Queensland history in that it provides evidence of the history and demography of the Rockhampton district, particularly displaying the diversity of the town's cultural, religious and ethnic groups. It is important also in demonstrating architectural trends in monumental design over more than a century.

The place is important because of its aesthetic significance.

The diverse collection of memorials, the grounds, the formal arrangement of graves, and the historically significant collection of plant species, exhibit particular aesthetic characteristics valued by the community generally, and in particular by persons interested in the demonstration of the craftsmanship of monumental masons and in the history of cemetery design and aesthetics.

The place has a special association with the life or work of a particular person, group or organisation of importance in Queensland's history.

The place has a special association with persons of importance in Queensland history, and in the Rockhampton district, in particular William Kidston, Premier of Queensland (1908–11), and several mayors of Rockhampton.
