= Owen Daniel =

Australian politician

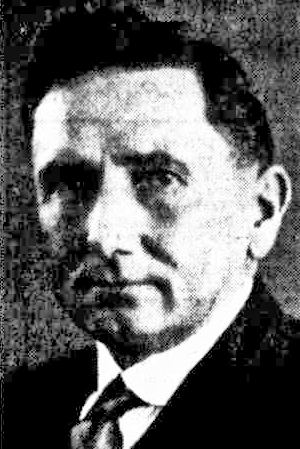

Member of the Queensland Legislative Assembly for Keppel
- In office 11 May 1929 – 5 January 1936
- Preceded by: James Larcombe
- Succeeded by: David Daniel

Personal details
- Born: Owen Daniel; 11 April 1875 Pontardawe, Glamorganshire, Wales
- Died: 5 January 1936 (aged 60) Rockhampton, Queensland, Australia
- Resting place: South Rockhampton Cemetery
- Party: Country and Progressive National Party
- Spouse(s): Sarah Ann Jenkins (m.1894 d.1933), Elvera Mary Petersen (m.1934)
- Relations: David Daniel (son)
- Occupation: Businessman

Owen Daniel (11 April 1875 – 5 January 1936) was a member of the Queensland Legislative Assembly.

== Biography ==
Daniel was born at Pontardawe, Glamorganshire, the son of Rees Daniel and his wife Ann. He was educated in Wales and after leaving school worked as a furnace-man in an iron and steel mill. He arrived in Queensland in 1900 where he set up several different businesses in Rockhampton including a tobacconist and casket agency.

On 22 December 1894 he married Sarah Ann Jenkins and together had three sons and two daughters. Sarah died in 1933 and the next year Daniel married Elvera Mary Petersen. He died in Rockhampton in January 1936 with his funeral proceeding from his Yaamba Rd residence to the South Rockhampton Cemetery.

== Public career ==
Daniel started in politics as an alderman on the Rockhampton City Council before resigning in 1929. He was then Chairman of the Livingstone Shire Council from 1933 until his death in 1936.

At the 1929 Queensland state election, Daniel, representing the Country and Progressive National Party, won the seat of Keppel in the Queensland Legislative Assembly. He defeated the long-standing member, James Larcombe of the Labor Party. He went on to represent Keppel until his death in 1936. At the subsequent by-election, his son David took over representing the electorate.

Daniel was prominently associated with the friendly societies and at one stage was president and secretary of the Medical Institute. He was chairman of the Hospitals Board and a committee member of the Ambulance Brigade. A Mason, He was past-master of the Mt Chalmers lodge and a member of the Yeppoon lodge.

Parliament of Queensland
Preceded by James Larcombe	Member for Keppel; 1929–1936	Succeeded by David Daniel
