= James Brennan (Queensland politician) =

Australian politician

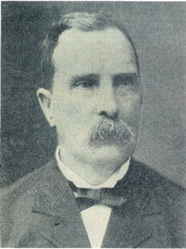

Member of the Queensland Legislative Assembly for Rockhampton North
- In office 18 May 1907 – 26 Apr 1912
- Preceded by: Henry Turner
- Succeeded by: Seat abolished

Personal details
- Born: James Brennan; 25 February 1837 Paisley, Scotland
- Died: 13 June 1917 (aged 80) Wooloowin, Queensland, Australia
- Resting place: Lutwyche Cemetery
- Party: Kidstonites
- Spouse: Margaret Mills Dale (d.1931)
- Occupation: Meat worker

James Brennan (25 February 1837 - 13 June 1917) was a member of the Queensland Legislative Assembly.

== Biography ==
Brennan was born at Paisley, Scotland, the son of James Brennan Snr and his wife Jane (née Cruikshank). He was educated in Paisley and he arrived in Australia sometime before 1864 and took up mining at Gympie. He was an employee at the Queensland Meat Export and Agriculture Co. in Brisbane and Townsville, and from 1902 was the manager at the Lake's Creek Meatworks in Rockhampton.

He was married to Margaret Mills Dale (d.1931) and died at Wooloowin in Brisbane in June 1917. His funeral proceeded from his Miles Street, Wooloowin residence to the Lutwyche Cemetery.

== Public life ==
Brennan, a Kidstonite, won the seat of Rockhampton North at the by-election held in 1907 to replace the sitting member, Henry Turner, who had been appointed to the Queensland Legislative Council. Brennan held it until 1912 when the seat was abolished. He stood for the new seat of Keppel that year but was defeated.

Parliament of Queensland
| Preceded by Henry Turner | Member for Rockhampton North; 1907–1912 | Abolished |
