= James Larcombe =

Australian politician

The Hon James Larcombe
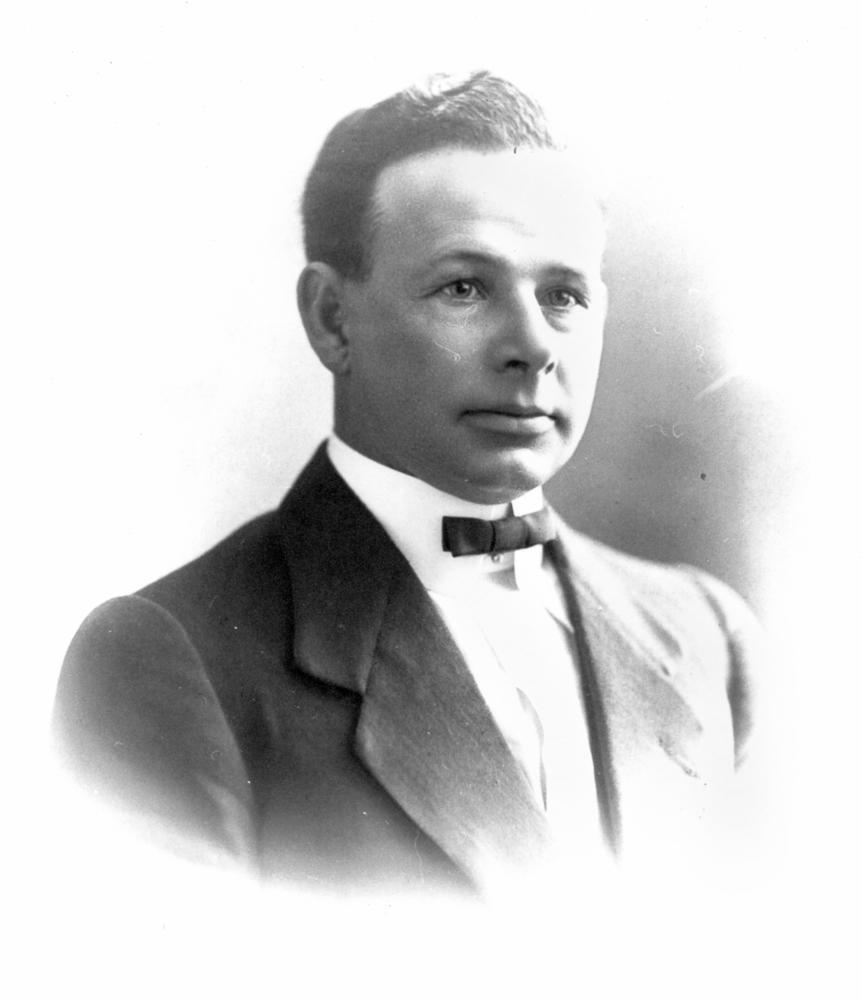

31st Treasurer of Queensland
- In office 7 March 1946 – 10 May 1950
- Preceded by: Ned Hanlon
- Succeeded by: Vince Gair
- Constituency: Rockhampton

Member of the Queensland Legislative Assembly for Keppel
- In office 27 April 1912 – 11 May 1929
- Preceded by: New seat
- Succeeded by: Owen Daniel

Member of the Queensland Legislative Assembly for Rockhampton
- In office 11 June 1932 – 19 May 1956
- Preceded by: Thomas Dunlop
- Succeeded by: Mick Gardner

Personal details
- Born: 25 April 1884 Rockhampton, Queensland
- Died: 21 June 1957 (aged 73) Brisbane, Queensland
- Resting place: South Rockhampton Cemetery
- Party: Labor
- Occupation: Butcher

James Larcombe (1884–1957) was a Labor politician from Queensland, Australia. He was a Member of the Queensland Legislative Assembly.

== Early life ==
James Larcombe was born in Rockhampton, Queensland on 25 April 1884. His father, also named James Larcombe, was a butcher, and his mother was Mary (née Lee). He was educated at the Jenkins private school in Rockhampton. As a young man, he worked as a butcher with his father and was active in the local labor movement.

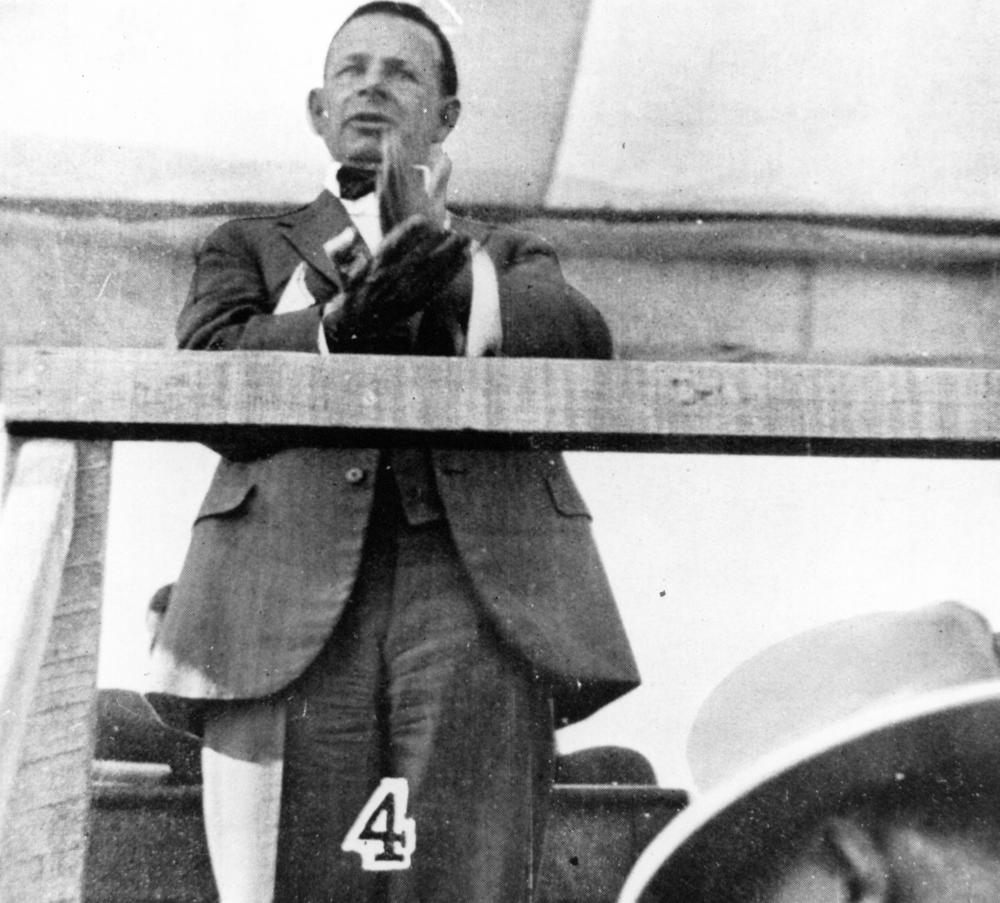
Larcombe speaking in 1928.

== Politics ==
At the 1912 election, he was elected to the Legislative Assembly of Queensland to represent the newly created electoral district of Keppel. While the MLA for Keppel, he was a minister without portfolio from 9 September 1919 to 22 October 1919. Then he was appointed as Secretary for Public Works from 22 October 1919 to 7 April 1920. Then he was Secretary for Railways (7 April 1920 to 21 May 1929). At the 1929 election, he was defeated by Daniel Owen of the Country and Progressive National Party.

He was elected again to the legislative assembly in the electoral district of Rockhampton at the 1932 election. Again he served in a number of ministries:

- Secretary for Mines: 12 April 1939 to 4 August 1939
- Minister for Transport: 4 August 1939 to 27 April 1944
- Secretary for Public Instruction: 27 April 1944 to 7 March 1946
- Treasurer: 7 March 1946 to 10 May 1950
- Attorney-General: 10 May 1950 to 10 March 1952

He held the seat of Rockhampton until his retirement at the 1956 election.

Combining his service in Keppel and Rockhampton makes him the assembly's longest serving member with 40 years 11 months 22 days; however, Joh Bjelke-Petersen has the longest period of continuous service (40 years 6 months 28 days).

== Later life ==
Having never married, Larcombe died in Brisbane on 21 June 1957. He was accorded a State funeral which took place from St Paul's Cathedral, Rockhampton to the South Rockhampton Cemetery.

Parliament of Queensland
New seat	Member for Keppel; 1912–1929	Succeeded by Owen Daniel
Preceded by Thomas Dunlop	Member for Rockhampton; 1932–1956	Succeeded by Mick Gardner
