= Les Yewdale =

Australian politician

Member of the Queensland Legislative Assembly for Rockhampton North
- In office 27 May 1972 – 2 December 1989
- Preceded by: Merv Thackeray
- Succeeded by: Rob Schwarten

Personal details
- Born: Leslie John Yewdale; 30 April 1928 Rockhampton, Queensland, Australia
- Died: 1 January 1999 (aged 70) Rockhampton, Queensland, Australia
- Party: Labor
- Spouse: Margaret McCulloch
- Occupation: Trade union secretary, Waterside worker

Leslie John "Les" Yewdale (30 April 1928 – 1 January 1999) was an Australian politician. He was a Member of the Queensland Legislative Assembly.

Yewdale was born in Rockhampton to Arthur Edward Yewdale and Maude Anne, née Walsh. He attended state schools in Berserker and Rockhampton before graduating from Christian Brothers College. Working variously as a meatworker, station hand, tradesman's assistant, builder's labourer and waterside worker, he became secretary of the Rockhampton Trades and Labour Council in 1959, holding the position until 1972.

In 1972 he was also elected to the Queensland Legislative Assembly as the Labor member for Rockhampton North, although he had to contend with the sitting Labor MP, Merv Thackeray, who ran as an independent. In 1975 he was promoted to the front bench as Opposition Spokesman on Industrial Development, Labour Relations and Consumer Affairs and Sport, a portfolio simplified to Labour Relations in 1977. From 1982 he held the portfolios of Manpower, Technology and Industrial Relations (1982), Police and Main Roads (1982–83), Police, Road Safety and State Emergency Services (1983) and Works and Housing (1984–86). He was also secretary of the Parliamentary Labor Party from 1977 to 1988.

Yewdale retired from politics in 1989; he died in Rockhampton in 1999.

Parliament of Queensland
Preceded by Merv Thackeray	Member for Rockhampton North; 1972–1989	Succeeded by Rob Schwarten
