= William Harding (politician) =

Australian politician

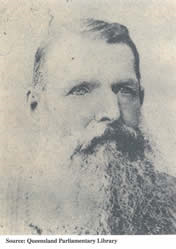

Member of the Queensland Legislative Assembly for Rockhampton North
- In office 13 May 1893 – 4 April 1896
- Preceded by: Rees Jones
- Succeeded by: James Stewart

Personal details
- Born: William St John Harding; 1 January 1835 County Cork, Ireland
- Died: 26 December 1903 (aged 68) Gladstone, Queensland, Australia
- Resting place: South Rockhampton Cemetery
- Party: Independent
- Spouse: Catherine Berry (nee Blayney)
- Occupation: Grazier

William St John Harding (1 January 1835 – 26 December 1903) was a member of the Queensland Legislative Assembly.

== Biography ==
Harding was born at County Cork, Ireland, the son of William Seymore St.John Harding. He was the licensee for the Talawanta Inn in Walgett N.S.W from 1868 to 1870. On arrival in Queensland he acquired grazing farms and was the licensee for the Mt Cornish Hotel in Muttaburra as well as the Emu Park Hotel.

He was married to Catherine Berry in Roma in 1871 and died in Rockhampton on Boxing Day, 1903 and buried in the South Rockhampton Cemetery.

== Public life ==
Harding, an independent, won the seat of Rockhampton North at the 1893 Queensland colonial election. He held it for one term, losing at the 1896 Queensland colonial election.

Parliament of Queensland
Preceded by Rees Jones	Member for Rockhampton North; 1893–1896	Succeeded by James Stewart
