= David Daniel (politician) =

Member of the Queensland Legislative Assembly from 1936 to 1944

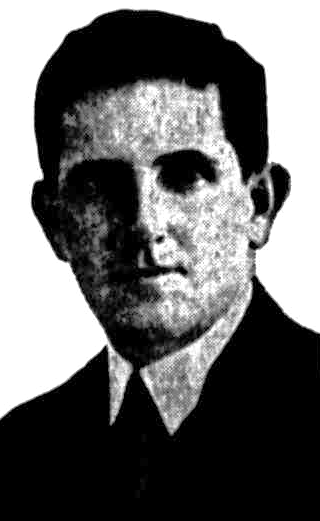

Member of the Queensland Legislative Assembly for Keppel
- In office 4 April 1936 – 15 April 1944
- Preceded by: Owen Daniel
- Succeeded by: Walter Ingram

Personal details
- Born: David John Marlais Daniel; 12 January 1903 Rockhampton, Queensland, Australia
- Died: 5 February 1962 (aged 59) Rockhampton, Queensland, Australia
- Party: Country Party
- Spouse: Julia Augusta Nelson (m.1927)
- Relations: Owen Daniel (father)
- Occupation: Tobacconist

David John Marlais Daniel (12 January 1903 – 5 February 1962) was a member of the Queensland Legislative Assembly.

== Early and personal life ==
Daniel was born at Rockhampton, Queensland, the son of Owen Daniel and his wife Sarah Ann (née Jenkins). He was educated at Rockhampton State School and then attended the Rockhampton Grammar School before owning a tobacco shop in that city.

On 19 January 1927, he married Julia Augusta Nelson and together had two sons. He died at his home in Rockhampton in February 1962.

== Public career ==
Daniel, a Country Party representative, won the 1936 by-election for the seat of Keppel in the Queensland Legislative Assembly, taking it over from his father, Owen Daniel, who had died in February of that year. David Daniel went on to represent the electorate until his retirement at the 1944 Queensland state election.

In 1941 he was given leave by the parliament to join the Second Australian Imperial Force during World War II, being discharged in 1944 at the rank of Major.

Parliament of Queensland
Preceded by Owen Daniel	Member for Keppel; 1936–1944	Succeeded by Walter Ingram
