= Brittany Lauga =

Australian politician (born 1986)

Brittany Lauga MP
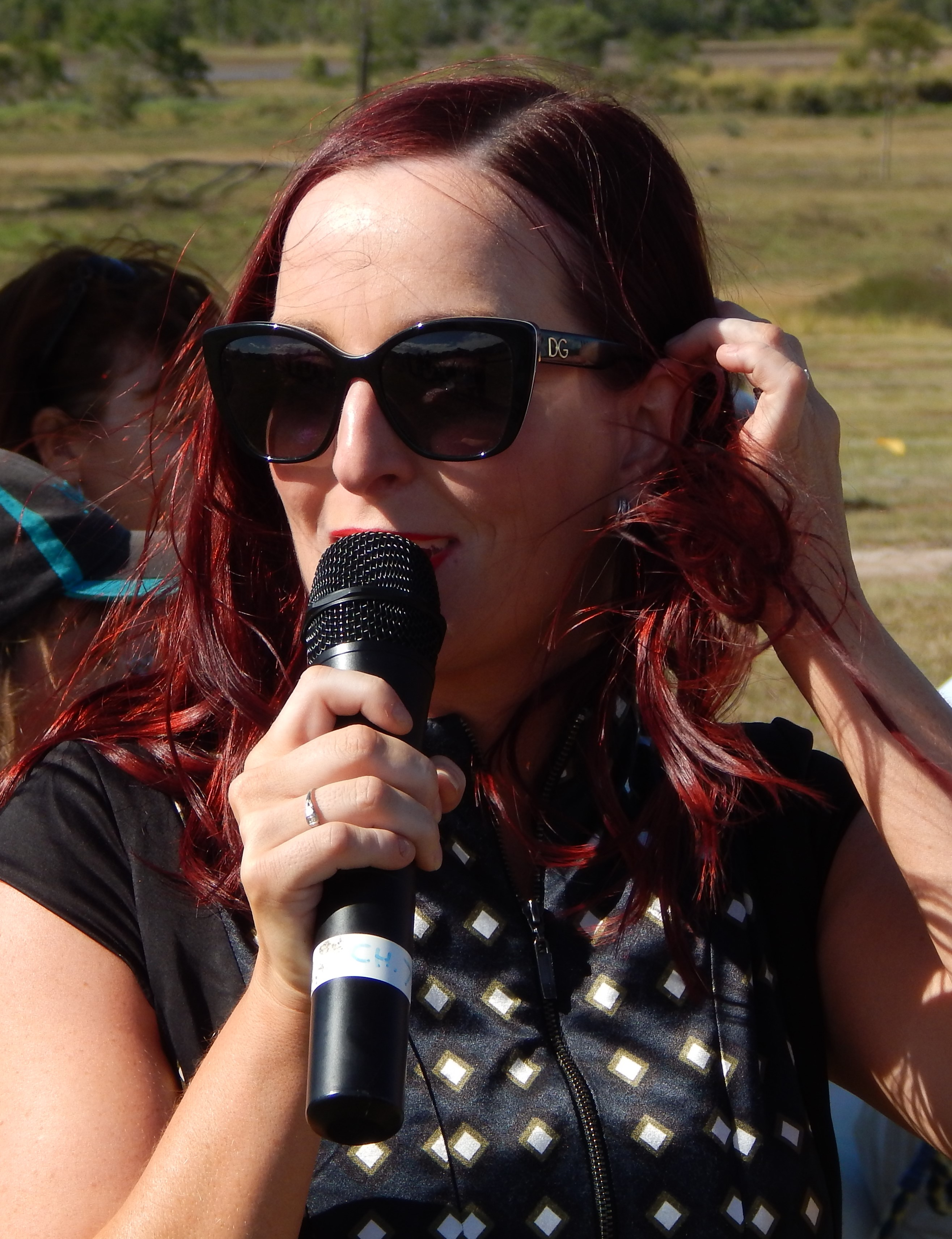
- Lauga in 2015

Member of the Queensland Legislative Assembly for Keppel
- In office 31 January 2015 – 26 October 2024
- Premier: Annastacia Palaszczuk; Steven Miles
- Preceded by: Bruce Young
- Succeeded by: Nigel Hutton

Personal details
- Born: Brittany Louise McKee; 19 June 1986 (age 40) Kingaroy, Queensland
- Party: Labor
- Education: Queensland University of Technology
- Profession: Urban and Regional planner
- Website: brittanylauga.com.au

Brittany Louise Lauga (née McKee; born 19 June 1986) is an Australian former politician and town planner. She was the Labor member for Keppel in the Queensland Legislative Assembly from 2015 to 2024.

== Early life, education and non-political career ==
Lauga grew up in Central Queensland, Australia, where her current residence is at the suburb of Parkhurst, in the Electoral District of Keppel.

For high school Lauga went to Rockhampton Grammar School where she graduated in 2003. She went on to study a dual Bachelor of Laws/Bachelor of Justice at Queensland University of Technology (QUT) in Brisbane partially for two years, then moving onto a Bachelor of Urban Development and graduating with honours. While Lauga was studying her Bachelor of Urban Development she was a founding member of the QUT Planning Students Association and a General Secretary of the QUT Student Guild. Lauga later commenced a Master of Business Administration (MBA) at CQUniversity in Rockhampton.

After graduating as a town planner, Lauga went to work for Craven Ovenden Town Planning as a student town planner. After leaving Craven Ovenden Town Planning, Lauga went on and worked for the Department of Housing and Public Works within Project Services involving the planning and project management of social housing. Lauga then went on to work for Central Queensland consulting firm, CQG Consulting.

== Personal life ==
In April 2017, Lauga announced that she was expecting her first child. She gave birth to a daughter in October.

Parliament of Queensland
Preceded by Bruce Young	Member for Keppel; 2015–2024	Succeeded by Nigel Hutton
