= Nigel Hutton =

Australian politician

Nigel Hutton MP

Member of the Queensland Legislative Assembly for Keppel
- Incumbent
- Assumed office 26 October 2024
- Preceded by: Brittany Lauga

Personal details
- Party: Liberal National

Nigel Grantly Hutton is an Australian politician.

He was elected member of the Legislative Assembly of Queensland for Keppel in the 2024 Queensland state election.

== Political career ==
=== Local government ===
In November 2013, Hutton was elected to the new Livingstone Shire Council which had been re-established following a brief period of being amalgamated with the Rockhampton Regional Council area from 2008 to 2014.

In August 2017, Hutton was elected by his fellow councillors to be the deputy mayor of Livingstone Shire following the resignation of the former deputy mayor the previous month. Hutton served in the position until 2020.

Hutton was successfully re-elected as a councillor at both the 2016 and 2020 Queensland local elections, a position which he continued serving in until his resignation in January 2023.

=== State government ===
In August 2023, Hutton was announced as the LNP's candidate for the seat of Keppel for the 2024 Queensland state election.

He was successfully elected with Labor's Brittany Lauga who had been the local member since 2015, conceding defeat on the night of the election.

== Personal life ==
Hutton is a local teacher.

After graduating from Yeppoon State High School in 2004, Hutton completed an internship at the London School of Economics before studying at Griffith University and Central Queensland University. While studying, Hutton worked at Brisbane City Council, Queensland Health, the Australian Taxation Office and Her Majesty's Most Loyal Opposition in the Palace of Westminster.

Parliament of Queensland
Preceded by Brittany Lauga	Member for Keppel; 2024–present	Incumbent
