= Henry Turner (Queensland politician) =

Australian politician

The Hon Henry Turner

Member of the Queensland Legislative Assembly for Rockhampton North
- In office 29 June 1901 – 17 October 1901
- Preceded by: James Stewart
- Succeeded by: John Linnett
- In office 11 March 1902 – 18 May 1907
- Preceded by: John Linnett
- Succeeded by: James Brennan

Member of the Queensland Legislative Council
- In office 3 July 1907 – 23 March 1922

Personal details
- Born: Henry Turner; 10 November 1844 Aynho, Northamptonshire, England
- Died: 9 August 1932 (aged 87) Brisbane, Queensland, Australia
- Resting place: Toowong Cemetery
- Party: Kidstonites
- Other political affiliations: Labor
- Spouse: Louisa Brown (d.1882)
- Occupation: Meatworker

Henry Turner (10 November 1844 – 9 August 1932) was a member of both the Queensland Legislative Council and the Queensland Legislative Assembly.

== Early life ==
Turner was born in November 1844 at Aynho, Northamptonshire, England to Thomas Turner and his wife Leah (née Fathers). He was apprenticed in a plant nursery and then worked as a gardener. Upon arriving in Rockhampton in 1880, he worked at the local meatworks for many years where he began to take an active interest in the labour movement.

== Political career ==
Upon the resignation of James Stewart to stand for a senate seat in the 1901 federal election, Turner, representing the Labour Party, contested the subsequent by-election in June of that year and defeated the Ministerial candidate, John Linnett. The election outcome was successfully challenged in the courts by Linnett and he was declared duly elected.

Turner once again won the seat at the 1902 state election and in the 1904 state election and remained the sitting member till his resignation in May 1907. Two months later, Premier William Kidston appointed Turner to the Legislative Council, remaining there until the Labour members of the Council voted to abolish the Council in March 1922.

== Personal life ==
Turner married Louisa Langford Stevens in Middlesex in 1866. The couple had 5 children. His wife Louisa died on 11 February 1882 and was buried in the North Rockhampton Cemetery. He subsequently married Ida Martha Ridgewell (b. 29 March 1879; d. 1965) and they had two children, Gwendoline Ida (1911–1975) and Geoffrey Ridgewell (1918–1998).

Henry died in Brisbane in 1932 and was buried in Toowong Cemetery.

Parliament of Queensland
Preceded by James Stewart	Member for Rockhampton North; 1901	Succeeded by John Linnett
Preceded by John Linnett	Member for Rockhampton North; 1902–1907	Succeeded by James Brennan
