= Rees Jones (politician) =

Australian politician

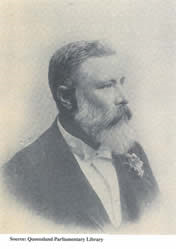
- Rees Jones c.1890

Member of the Queensland Legislative Assembly for Rockhampton North
- In office 12 May 1888 – 13 May 1893
- Preceded by: New seat
- Succeeded by: William Harding

Personal details
- Born: Rees Rutland Jones; 12 February 1840 Sydney, New South Wales, Australia
- Died: 30 November 1916 (aged 76) Sydney, Colony of New South Wales
- Resting place: Waverley Cemetery
- Spouse: Jane Brown (m.1865)
- Relations: David Jones (uncle)
- Occupation: Solicitor

Rees Rutland Jones (1840–1916) was a solicitor and politician in Queensland, Australia. He was a Member of the Queensland Legislative Assembly.

== Early life ==
Rees Rutland Jones was born in 1840 in Sydney, New South Wales, the son of Rees Jones and Ann (née Thompson). He was the nephew of David Jones, the department store merchant.

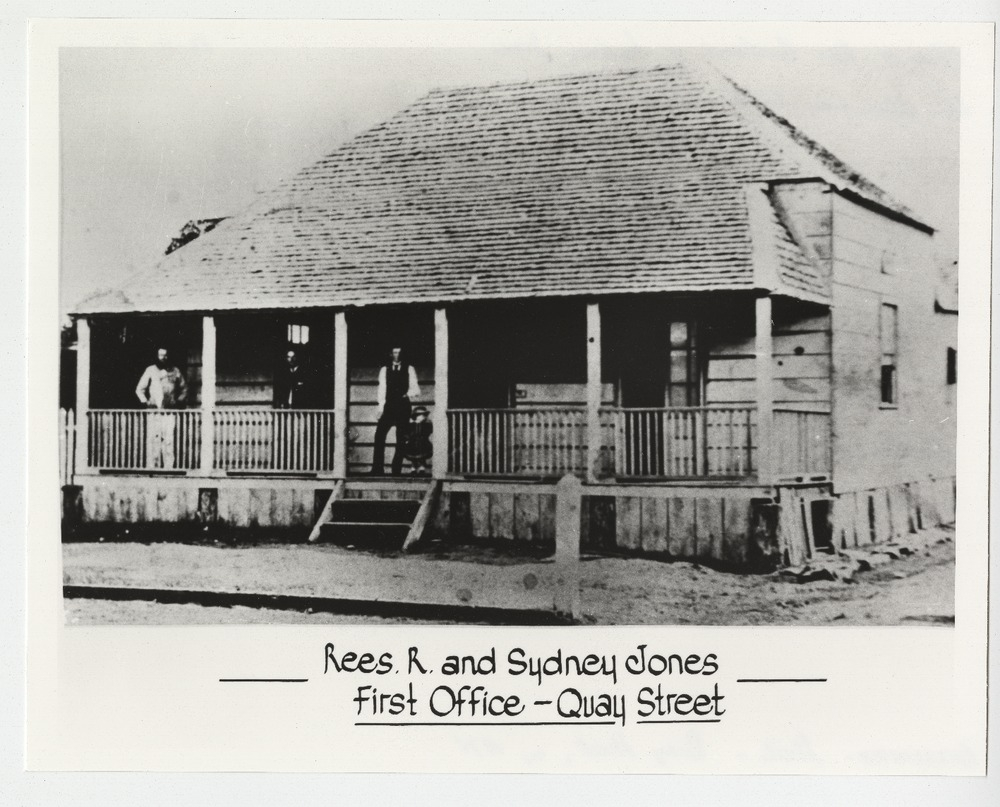
First office building of Rees R and Sydney Jones in Rockhampton ca. 1875

== Legal practice ==
The legal firm Rees R and Sydney Jones was established in 1864 by Rees Rutland Jones and is today the oldest existing legal practice in Queensland. Rees Jones was the solicitor for the Mount Morgan Mining Company and the solicitor for the Rockhampton Town Council from the years 1871 until 1896.

== Politics ==
Jones was a member of the Rockhampton Municipal Council and the Member for Rockhampton North in the Queensland Legislative Assembly.

== Later life ==
Jones died on 30 November 1916 in a private hospital in Sydney, New South Wales, following an operation. He had travelled to Sydney to seek medical treatment for an ailment of his throat.

At the time of his death, Jones was the oldest practitioner on the Roll of the Supreme Court of Queensland.

The Rees R & Sydney Jones Building established in 1886 in Rockhampton for his legal firm is now heritage-listed.

Parliament of Queensland
New seat	Member for Rockhampton North; 1888–1893	Succeeded by William Harding
