= John Linnett (politician) =

Australian politician

Member of the Queensland Legislative Assembly for Rockhampton North
- In office 17 October 1901 – 11 March 1902
- Preceded by: Henry Turner
- Succeeded by: Henry Turner

Personal details
- Born: John Linnett; 1859 Essex, England
- Died: 16 May 1902 (aged 42–43) Rockhampton, Queensland, Australia
- Resting place: North Rockhampton Cemetery
- Party: Ministerialist
- Spouse: Ellen Conner (m.1887)
- Occupation: Butcher

John (Jack) Linnett (1859 – 16 May 1902) was a member of the Queensland Legislative Assembly.

He was born at Essex, England, the son of William Linnett and his wife Rachel (née Cook).

Linnett arrived in Rockhampton on the Southern Belle on 6 March 1874. On arrival, he trained as a butcher and remained in the industry all his life.

On 25 August 1887, he married Ellen Connor in Rockhampton. He died there in May 1902 and his funeral proceeded from his former residence to the North Rockhampton Cemetery.

== Public life ==
Linnett, a Ministerialist, contested the 1901 by-election for the seat of Rockhampton North in June 1901 to replace James Stewart, who had moved to the Australian Senate. Henry Turner of the Labour Party was declared the victor by a single vote, but Linnett lodged a successful petition against the result and was declared the victor.

The 1902 state elections were held the following March and Linnett did not stand for re-election with Henry Turner winning the seat.

Linnett represented North Rockhampton on the Fitzroy Bridge Board, was a member of the Gogango Divisional Board, and supported the horse-racing industry. He was Chairman of Directors of the Helena Extended mine, at Cawarral. Linnett was also an alderman and mayor of the North Rockhampton Borough Council and North Rockhampton Municipal Council.

== Legacy ==
Linnett Street in the suburb of Berserker in North Rockhampton is named after John Linnett.

Parliament of Queensland
Preceded by Henry Turner	Member for Rockhampton North; 1901–1902	Succeeded by Henry Turner
