= James Stewart (Queensland politician) =

Scottish-born Australian politician

The Honourable James Stewart
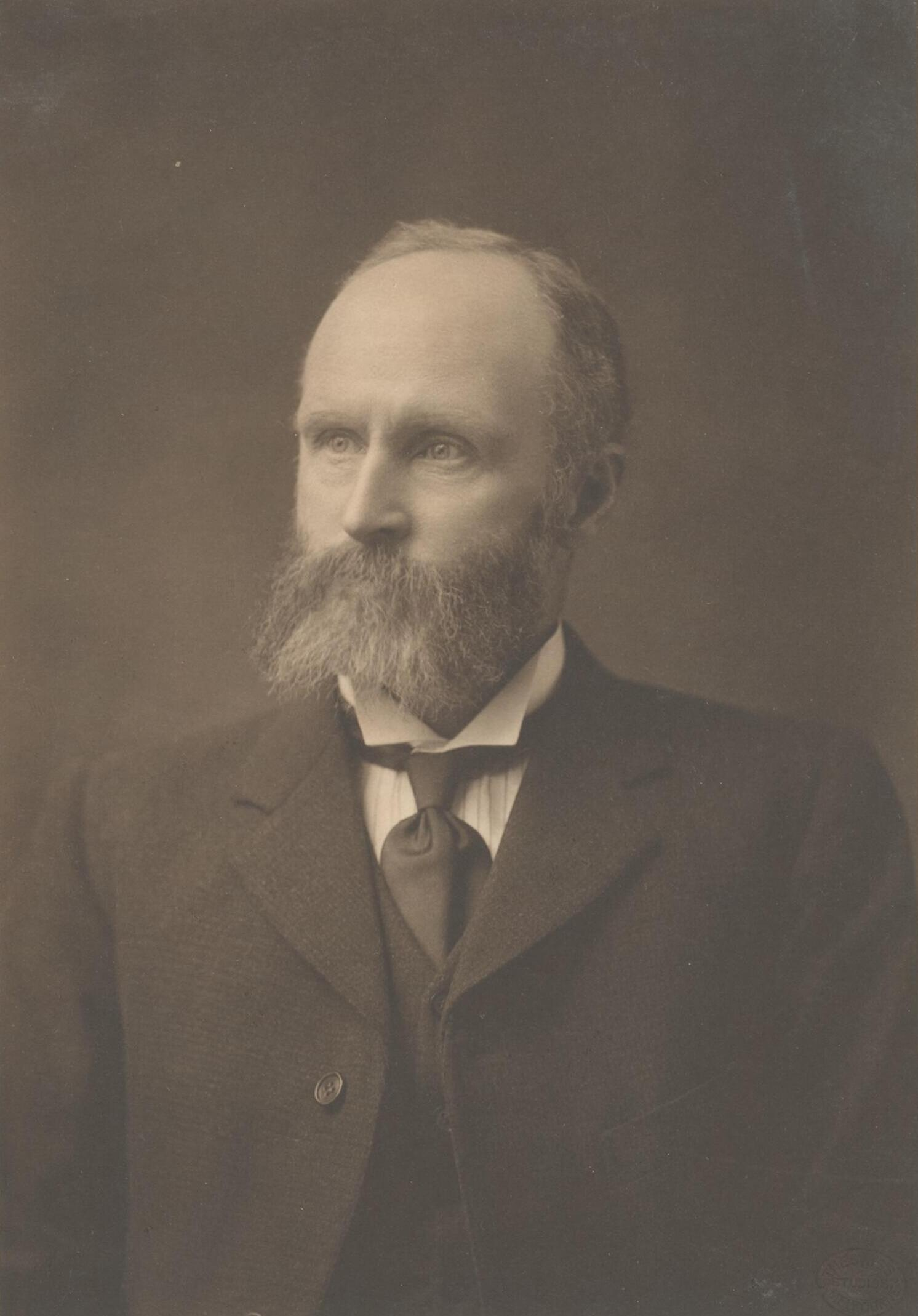

Senator for Queensland
- In office 30 March 1901 – 30 June 1917

Member of the Queensland Legislative Assembly for Rockhampton North
- In office 4 April 1896 – 5 June 1901
- Preceded by: William Harding
- Succeeded by: Henry Turner

Personal details
- Born: 7 September 1850 Grantown-on-Spey, Morayshire, Scotland
- Died: 20 December 1931 (aged 81) Strathpine, Queensland
- Resting place: Lawnton Cemetery
- Party: Australian Labor Party
- Spouse: Mary McIntyre
- Occupation: Railway worker, journalist

James Charles Stewart (7 September 1850 – 20 December 1931) was a Scottish-born Australian politician. He was a Member of the Queensland Legislative Assembly and later the Australian Senate.

== Early life ==
Born in Grantown-on-Spey, Morayshire, he received a primary education after which he worked as a farm and railway worker.

In 1888 he migrated to Australia, where he became involved in the unions movement. He edited the People's Newspaper in Rockhampton in Queensland.

== Politics ==
James Stewart sat on Rockhampton Council.

In 1893, he was elected to the Legislative Assembly of Queensland as the member for Rockhampton North.

In 1901, he left the Assembly to successfully contest the Australian Senate as a Labour candidate for Queensland. He remained in the Senate until his defeat in 1917.

== Later life ==
Stewart died in 1931 at Strathpine, Queensland and was buried in Lawnton Cemetery.

Parliament of Queensland
Preceded by William Harding	Member for Rockhampton North; 1896–1901	Succeeded by Henry Turner
