= Merv Thackeray =

Australian politician

Member of the Queensland Legislative Assembly for Keppel
- In office 3 August 1957 – 28 May 1960
- Preceded by: Viv Cooper
- Succeeded by: Seat abolished

Member of the Queensland Legislative Assembly for Rockhampton North
- In office 28 May 1960 – 27 May 1972
- Preceded by: New seat
- Succeeded by: Les Yewdale

Personal details
- Born: Mervyn Herbert Thackeray; 20 October 1925 Mackay, Queensland, Australia
- Died: 7 June 2014 (aged 88)
- Party: Labor
- Other political affiliations: Independent
- Spouse: Dorothy Scholes
- Occupation: Engine driver, Fireman, Grazier

Mervyn Herbert (Merv) Thackeray (20 October 1925 – 7 June 2014) was an Australian politician. He was a Labor Party member of the Legislative Assembly of Queensland from 1957 until 1972, representing Keppel (1957–1960) and Rockhampton North (1960–1972). He was disendorsed in January 1972 and ran unsuccessfully as an independent at the 1972 state election.

Thackeray was born in Mackay and educated at Mackay Primary School. He had a career as a grazier and on the railways before entering politics, working variously as engine driver, fireman, engine cleaner and union delegate. He entered politics at the 1957 election immediately following the Labor split of that year, defeating Labor defector and Queensland Labor Party candidate Viv Cooper on behalf of official Labor in the seat of Keppel. His seat of Keppel was abolished in 1960, and he successfully switched to its successor seat of Rockhampton North. He was subsequently re-elected in Rockhampton North a further three times.

Thackeray had a poor relationship with the party administration throughout the later part of his career. Mike Ahern claimed Thackeray had been "on the outer with the ALP, partly because he was a left-wing meat worker and partly because he was useless." Ahern further claimed that Thackeray had been leaking Labor tactics to Government Whip Vince Jones. In January 1972, Thackeray, along with two other dissident MLAs, Col Bennett and Ed Casey, were disendorsed after repeated clashes with the state secretary and state executive. The three MLAs ran for re-election as independents under the banner of the "True Labor Party", but Thackeray and Bennett were both soundly defeated.

Parliament of Queensland
Preceded by Viv Cooper	Member for Keppel; 1957–1960	Succeeded by Electorate abolished
Preceded by Electorate re-established	Member for Rockhampton North; 1960–1972	Succeeded by Les Yewdale
