= Electoral district of Keppel =

State electoral district of Queensland, Australia

Keppel Queensland—Legislative Assembly
- Electoral map of Keppel 2017
- State: Queensland
- Dates current: 1912–1960; 1992–present
- MP: Nigel Hutton
- Party: Liberal National
- Namesake: Great Keppel Island
- Electors: 37,052 (2020)
- Area: 3,763 km^{2} (1,452.9 sq mi)
- Coordinates: 22°55′S 150°43′E
Electorates around Keppel:
Mirani	Coral Sea	Coral Sea
Mirani	Keppel	Coral Sea
Rockhampton	Mirani	Gladstone

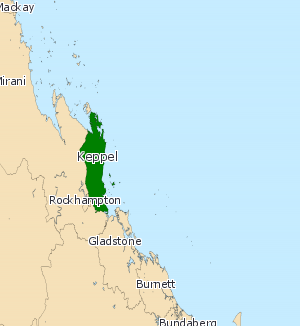
Electoral map of Keppel 2008

Keppel is an electoral district in the state of Queensland, Australia.

The electoral district encompasses the central Queensland coast from the mouth of the Fitzroy River in the south to Shoalwater Bay to the north. Major communities located within this electorate include Yeppoon, Emu Park, Byfield and the Rockhampton suburbs of Parkhurst and Lakes Creek.

== Members for Keppel ==
First incarnation (1912–1960)
Member	Party	Term
James Larcombe	Labor	1912–1929
Owen Daniel	CPNP	1929–1936
David Daniel	Country	1936–1944
Walter Ingram	Labor	1944–1952
Viv Cooper	Labor	1952–1957
Viv Cooper	Queensland Labor	1957
Merv Thackeray	Labor	1957–1960
Second incarnation (1992–present)
Member	Party	Term
Vince Lester	National	1992–2004
Paul Hoolihan	Labor	2004–2012
Bruce Young	Liberal National	2012–2015
Brittany Lauga	Labor	2015–2024
Nigel Hutton	Liberal National	2024–present

== Election results ==
2024 Queensland state election: Keppel
Party	Candidate	Votes	%	±%
Liberal National	Nigel Hutton	12,684	36.09	+6.52
Labor	Brittany Lauga	10,376	29.52	−16.70
One Nation	James Ashby	8,807	25.06	+9.41
Greens	Clancy Mullbrick	1,668	4.75	+0.76
Independent	Petrina Murphy	806	2.29	+2.29
Family First	Roger McWhinney	804	2.29	+2.29
Total formal votes		35,145	96.44	−0.64
Informal votes		1,296	3.56	+0.64
Turnout		36,441	90.21	+0.17
Two-party-preferred result
Liberal National	Nigel Hutton	21,254	60.48	+16.11
Labor	Brittany Lauga	13,891	39.52	−16.11
Liberal National gain from Labor		Swing	+16.11	

Primary vote results in Keppel (Parties that have never gotten 5% of the vote are omitted)
Labor
National/Liberal National
One Nation
City Country Alliance
Greens
Family First
Australian Democrats
Katter's Australian
Palmer United/United Australia Party
Independent
View source data.
Two-candidate-preferred vote results in Keppel View source data.
