= Rockhampton =

City in Queensland, Australia

- City
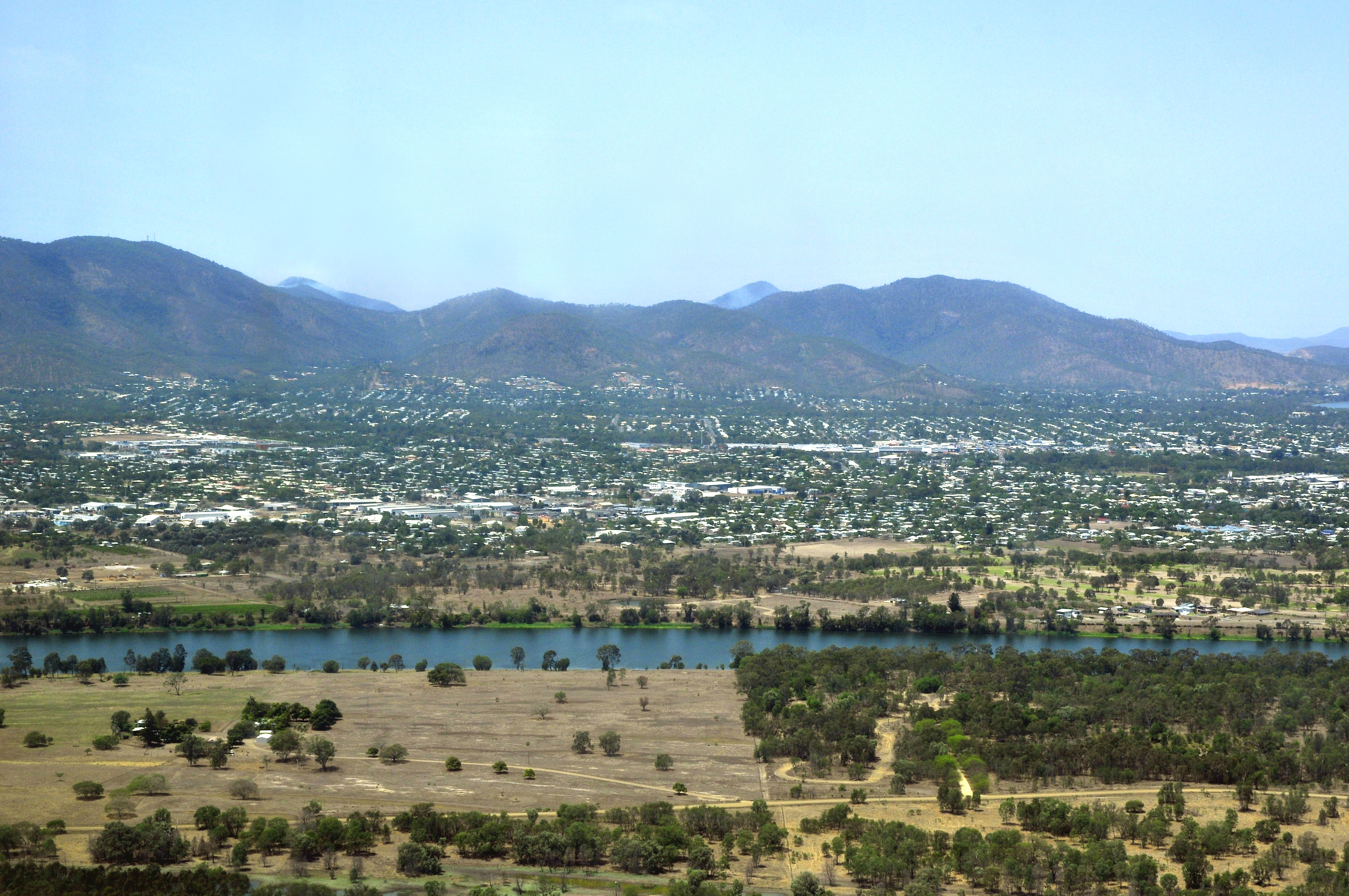
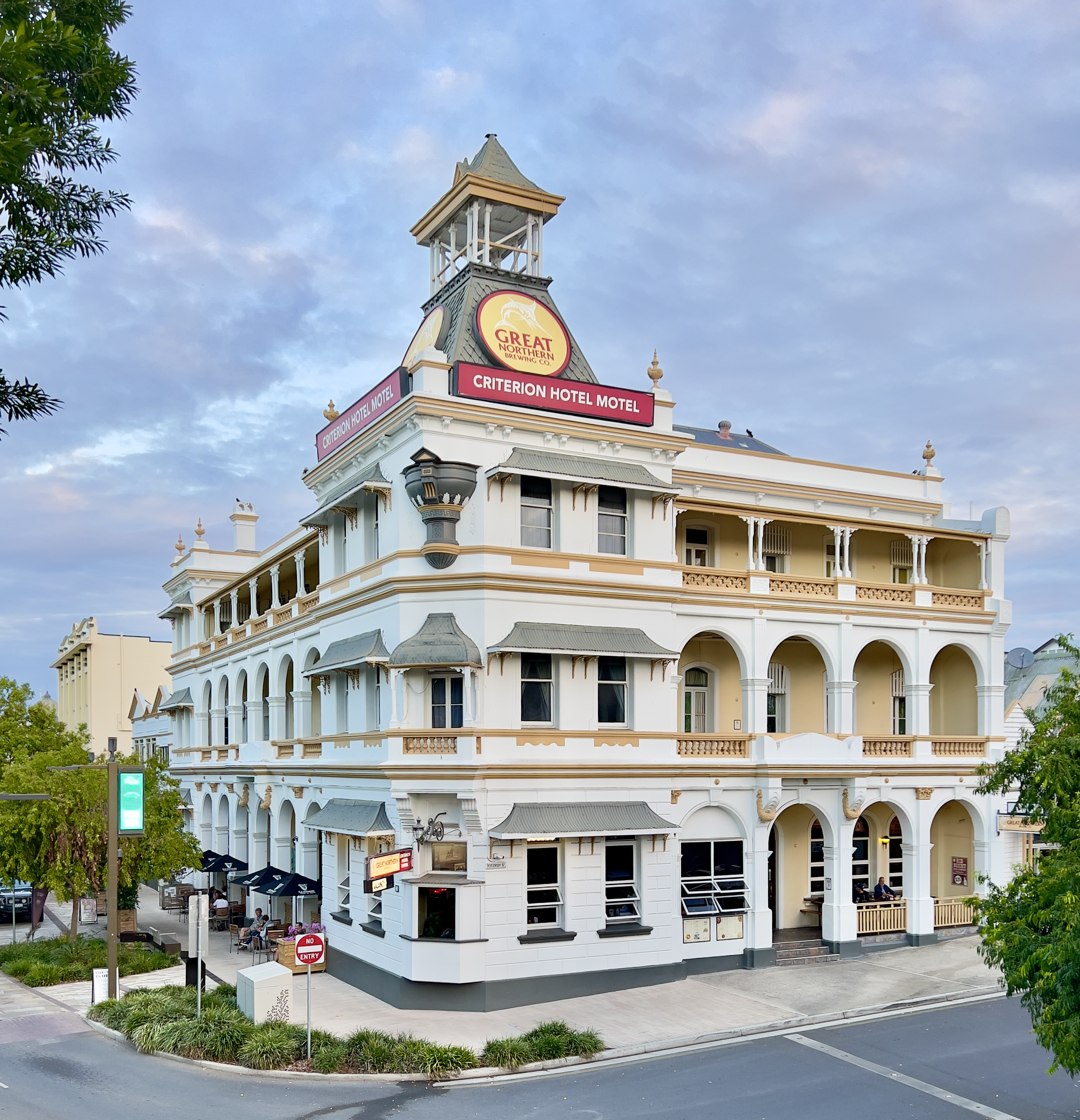
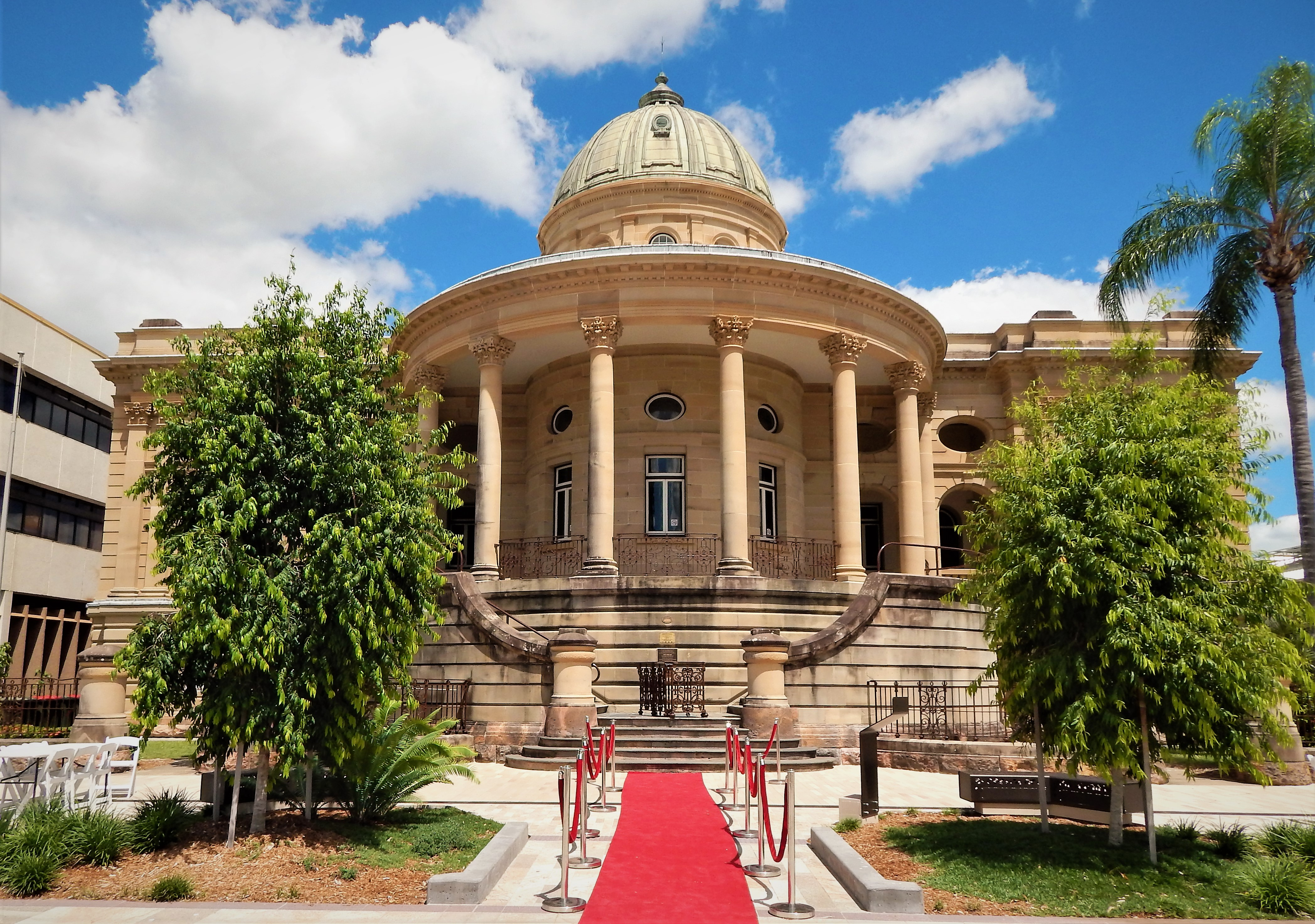
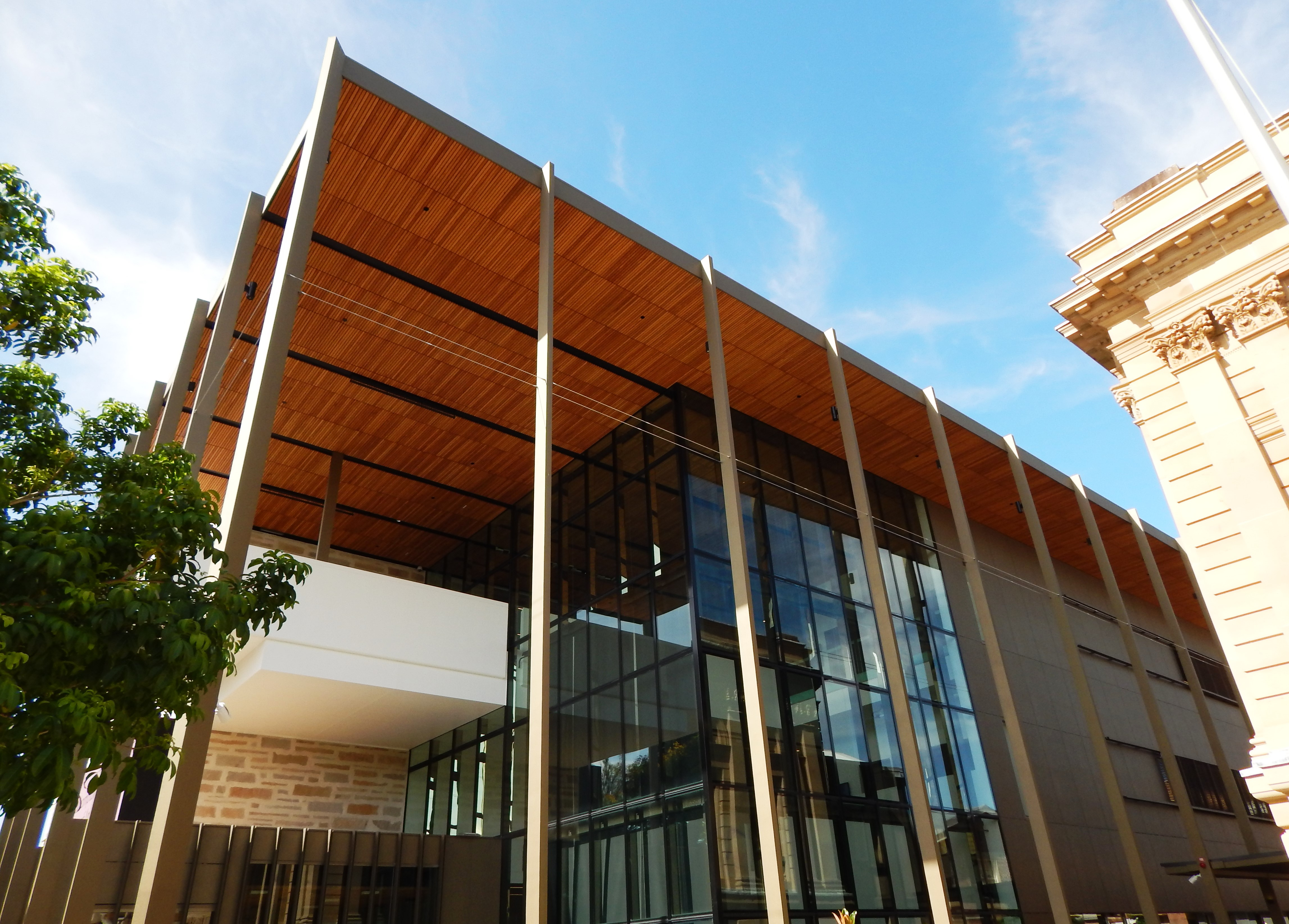
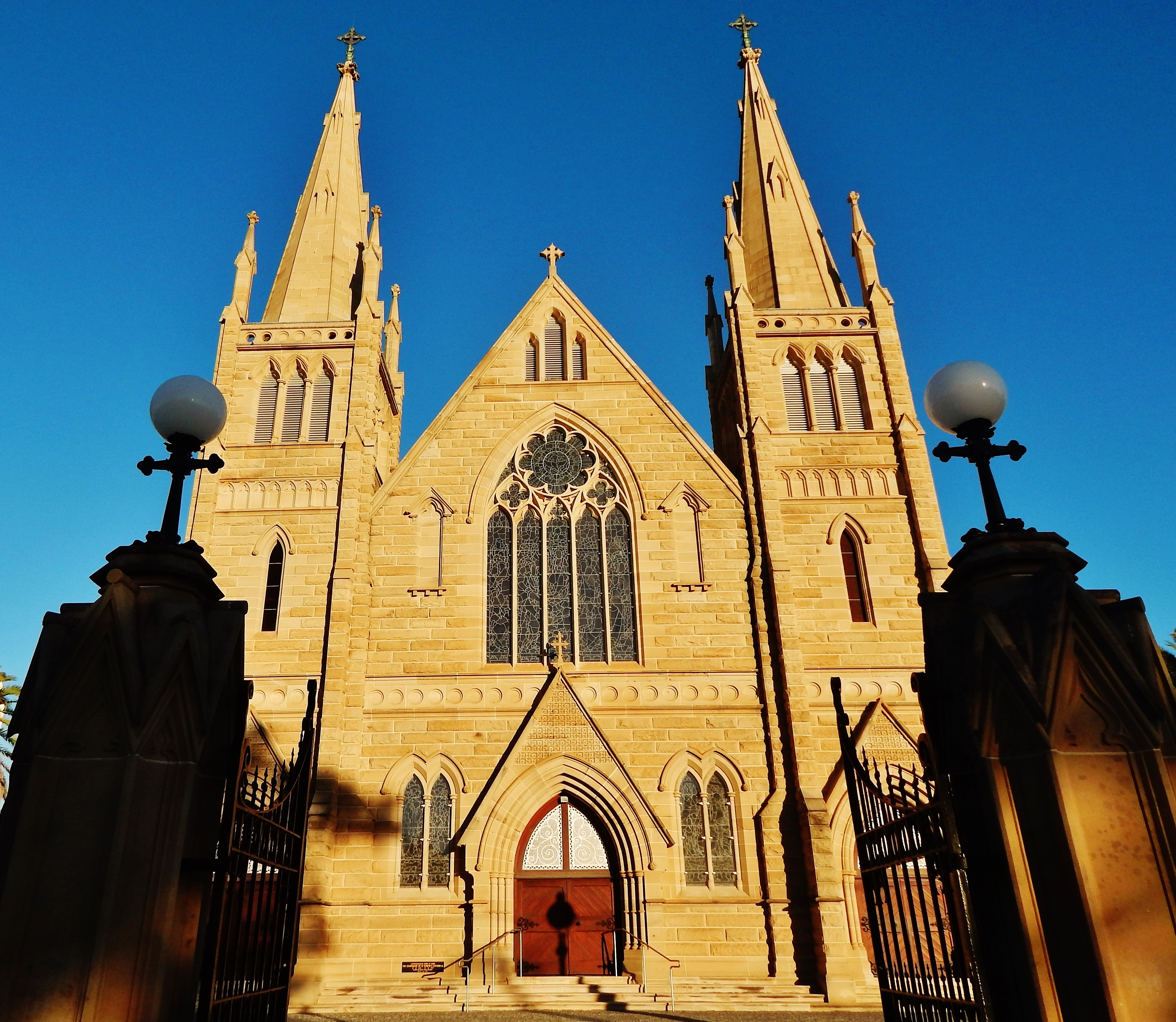
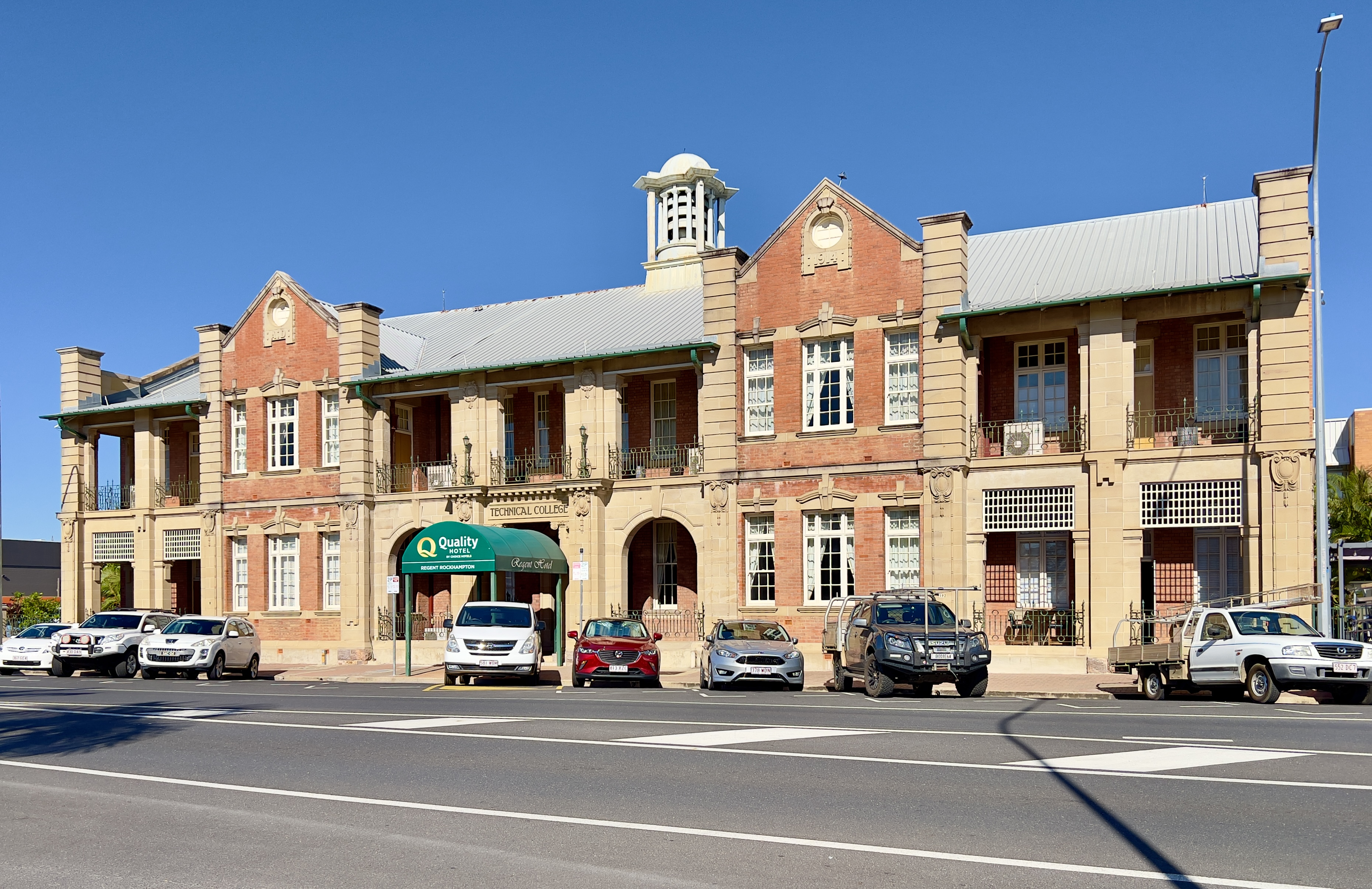
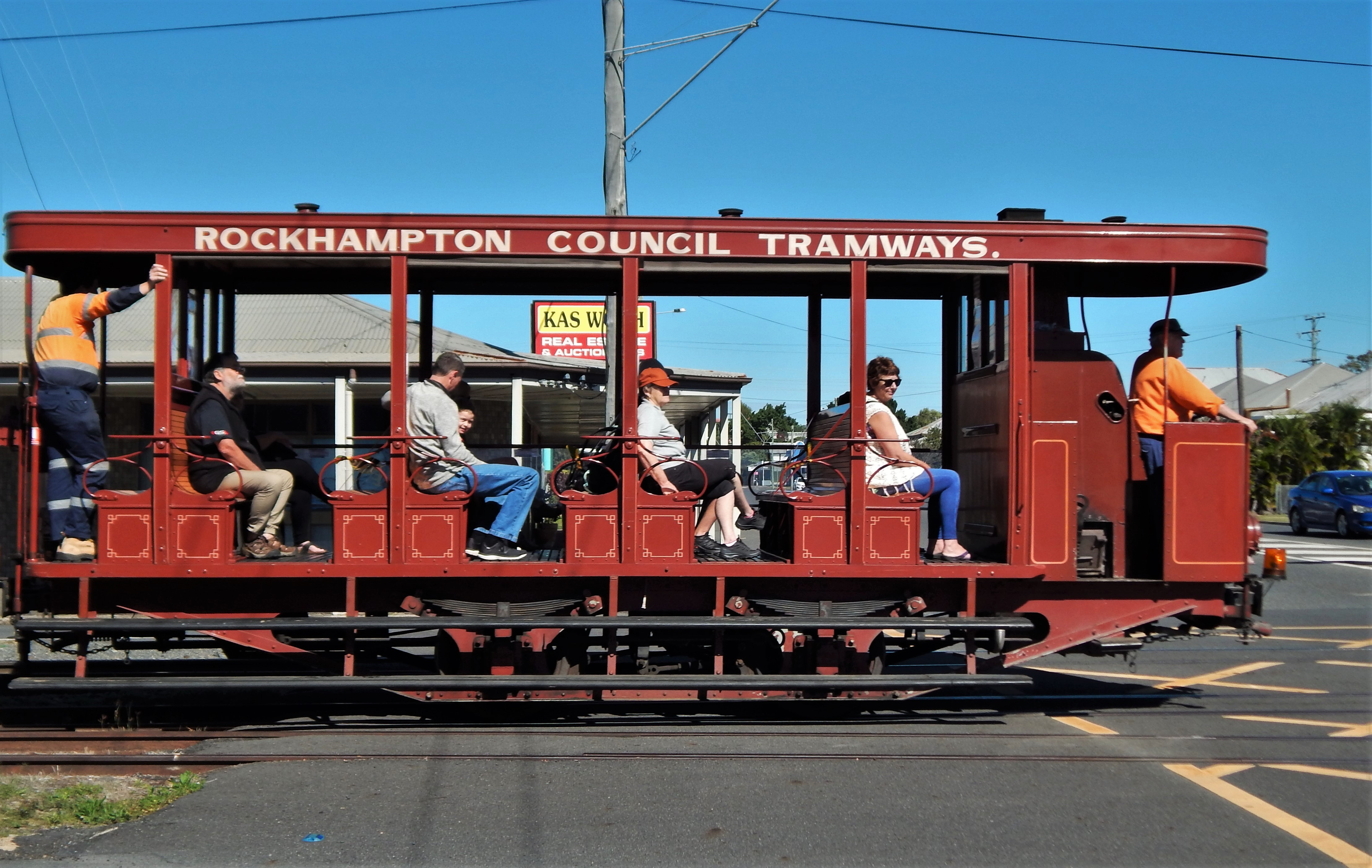
- A view over Frenchville and the Fitzroy River, with Mount Archer and the Berserker Range Quay street historic district Customs House The Rockhampton Museum of Art St Joseph's Cathedral Regent Hotel on Bolsover street French Purrey tram along Denison street

- Coordinates: 23.3781°S 150.5136°E
- Country: Australia
- State: Queensland
- Region: Central Queensland
- LGA: Rockhampton Region
- Location: 336 km (209 mi) SSE of Mackay; 630 km (390 mi) NNW of Brisbane
- Established: 1858

Government
  - State electorates: Rockhampton; Keppel
  - Federal division: Capricornia

Area (2011 urban)
  - Total: 580 km^{2} (220 sq mi)
- Elevation: 11.3 m (37 ft)
- Demonym: Rockhamptonite

Population
  - Total: 81,021 (2022) (23rd)
  - Density: 139.7/km^{2} (361.8/sq mi)
- Time zone: UTC+10 (AEST)
- Postcode: 4700, 4701, 4702
- Mean max temp: 28.3 °C (82.9 °F)
- Mean min temp: 16.6 °C (61.9 °F)
- Annual rainfall: 795.0 mm (31.30 in)

Rockhampton is a city in the Rockhampton Region of Central Queensland, Australia. In the 2021 census, the population of Rockhampton was 79,293. A common nickname for Rockhampton is "Rocky", and the demonym of Rockhampton is Rockhamptonite.

The Scottish-Norwegian explorers Charles and William Archer came across the Toonooba River in 1853 and named it in-honour of Sir Charles FitzRoy; they also named many local landmarks after figures in Norse mythology, including the Berserker Range named after the Norse warrior "Baresark". The Archer brothers took-up a run near Gracemere in 1855, and more settlers arrived soon thereafter, enticed by the fertile valleys. The town of Rockhampton was proclaimed in 1858, and surveyed to a design that closely resembled the Hoddle Grid of Melbourne, and consisted of a grid of wide boulevards and laneways, which was uncommon for Queensland cities. Within a year, gold was found at Canoona, and led to the first North Australian gold rush. The Canoona gold rush led to an influx of migrants that transformed Rockhampton into the second-largest port in the state; during this period, Rockhampton became infamous for crime and violence, and was described by the then visiting English novelist, Anthony Trollope as the "City of the Three S's"—"sin, sweat, and sorrow". Subsequent gold discoveries at the Mount Morgan Mine, which was at that time one of the most-productive gold mines in the world, laid the foundations for much of the city's Victorian architecture, and recast Rockhampton into a grand northern city.

The economy of Rockhampton has strengths in tourism, health, and agriculture, with a GRP of $5.7 billion as of 2023. The Central Queensland University founded in 1967, has its main campus at Norman Gardens, and is the only Australian university with a campus presence in every mainland state. The city is served by Rockhampton Airport, and Port Alma, located at the south end of the Fitzroy river delta.

Rockhampton is renowned for its architecture, cuisine, and music. The city's historic quarter is one of Australia's most significant 19th-century streetscapes and is listed on the National Trust; the quarter comprises three city blocks along Quay street, from Fitzroy to Derby street, and is known for its neoclassical architecture, dining and nightlife.

Some of the historical sites and landmarks of the city include: St Aubins, Kenmore House, the Alexandra Railway Bridge, St Joseph's Cathedral and the nearby Central Park. The Rockhampton Botanic Gardens are one of the oldest public gardens in the country, being founded in 1869 and is also the location of the Rockhampton War Memorial, as well as the Rockhampton Zoo. Rockhampton has nationally prominent cultural institutions, including the Rockhampton Museum of Art, one of the most extensive regional galleries in Australia, and the Dreamtime Cultural Centre.

== History ==
=== Indigenous Australians ===
The Capricorn district is the traditional home of the Darumbal Aboriginal people. The Darumbal (Tarumbul, Tharoombool) language region includes the city of Rockhampton extending south towards Raglan Creek and north towards the Styx River and inland along the Broad Sound Ranges.

=== British colonisation ===
The British colonisation of the area began in 1853, when the Archer brothers, Charles and William, who were seeking grazing lands arrived in the Rockhampton area. They were acting on information from earlier expeditions by Ludwig Leichhardt and Thomas Mitchell, who had explored the area in 1844 and 1846 and noted suitable land for grazing then.

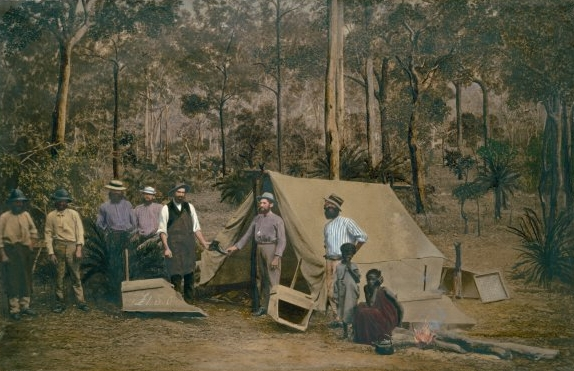
An overpainted albumen print of Aboriginal people and gold diggers near Rockhampton, around the 1860s, National Library of Australia

In January 1854, the New South Wales government proclaimed two new districts: Port Curtis and Leichhardt, roughly today's Fitzroy Region. In August 1855, the Archer brothers returned to set up their pastoral run at Gracemere. The Fitzroy River provided a convenient waterway for shipping of supplies and produce, and the Archer brothers constructed a wool shed just downstream of a bar of rocks that prevented further upstream navigation from the coast. These rocks were incorporated with the traditional English term for a village, and the name "Rockhampton" was first coined by Charles Archer and the local Commissioner from Crown Lands, William Wiseman.

In 1855, Scottish colonists and brothers William Thomas Elliott and George Mackenzie Elliot arrived at Gracemere and soon after, took up landholdings at Canoona, north of present-day Yaamba. Their father was James Elliot, 3rd Laird of Wolfelee House near Hawick in Scotland. One of their other brothers was Walter Elliot of the East India Company and secretary to the governor of the Madras Presidency.

In January 1856, after a massacre of local Aboriginal people perpetrated by Lieutenant John Murray of the Native Police at nearby Nankin Creek, some 200 Aboriginal men, women and children came to Canoona and began shouting at the employees of the Elliots. William Thomas Elliot and his men opened fire at random upon the group which fled after a short time. William and an employee were wounded (the employee reportedly died) and about seven of the local inhabitants were killed. Fellow colonist, Charles Archer of Gracemere and a group of Native Police troopers later pursued these Aboriginal people toward the east and punished them further. Local Aboriginal people friendly to Archer were also fired upon, killing one.

Permanent British settlement at the Rockhampton township began in July 1856, when Richard Palmer travelled from Gladstone with an escort of Native Police under sub-Lieutenant Walter Powell to set up a store. Powell arrived at the site first and constructed the Native Police barracks. This was the first habitable British building established at Rockhampton and it was located on the south bank of the Fitzroy River at the end of Albert Street.

With abundant grazing lands and waters from the Fitzroy River and its many tributaries and lagoons, the region continued to expand rapidly. In 1858, the town of Rockhampton was officially proclaimed. The town was surveyed at this time and the first sales of building allotments were held that year. In 1859, gold was discovered at Canoona. Miners rushed to the new field, using the site of Rockhampton on the Fitzroy River as the nearest navigable port. The Canoona field proved to be very disappointing and thousands of would-be gold seekers were left stranded at Rockhampton. Although many returned south, others stayed, adding to the new town's population.

Conflict with Aboriginal people in the region continued and further massacres occurred. In 1859, John Arthur Macartney attempted to stock his cousin's Belmont property just to the north of Rockhampton when a shepherd was killed by local Aboriginal men. 2nd Lieutenant Frederick Carr of the Native Police together with his troopers, the Macartneys, Peter Fitzallan MacDonald and Henry Brisdon, formed an armed group which set out to track down those responsible. The group followed the tracks and "dispersed" them. One account of this incident describes how around hundred of the tribe were rounded up and "it ended in the usual way and the bulk of the wild mob were shot."

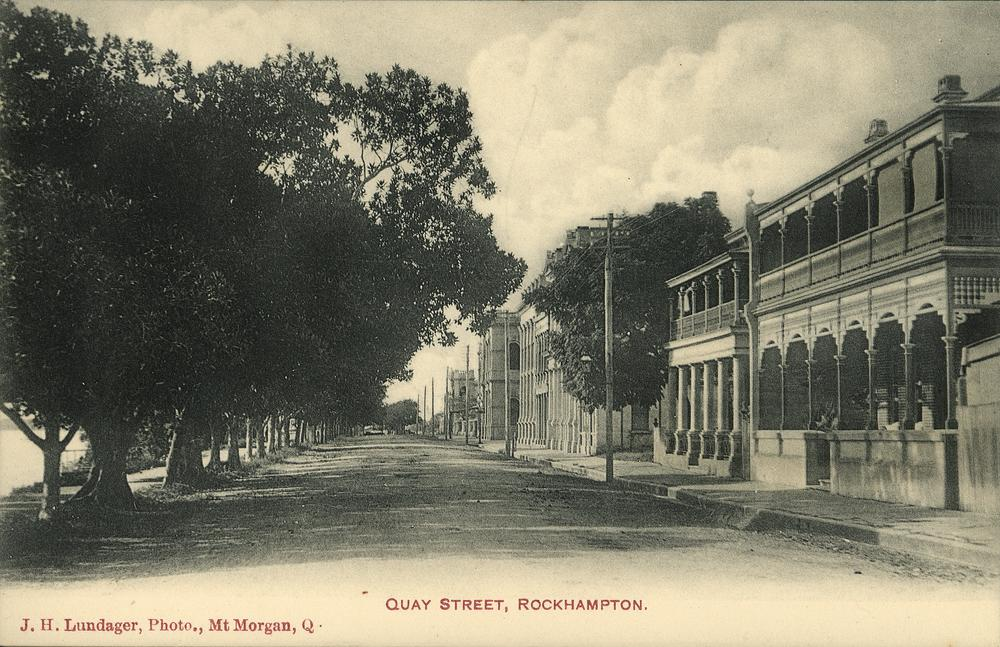
Houses on Quay Street, the line of native plums was planted by French botanist Anthelme Thozet in 1867

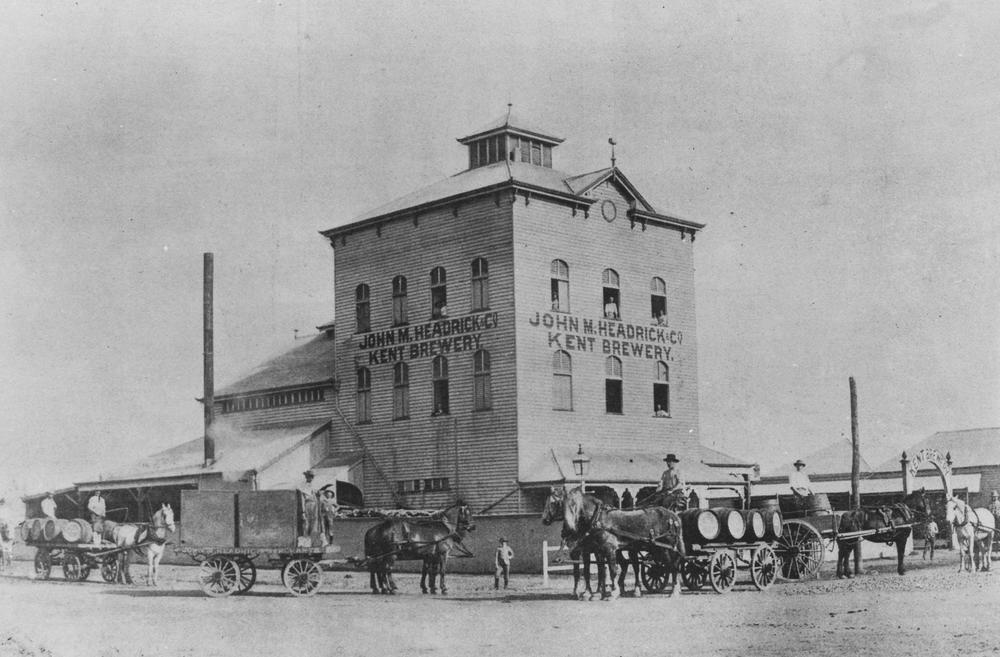
Horsedrawn carts and carriages in front of Kent Brewery, ca. 1895

By 1861, the town boasted a regular newspaper, banks, court house, and school of arts. Direct shipments of imported goods and migrants from the United Kingdom began to be received during the 1860s. In 1862, land in the Kensington Estate, described as just three miles from "the most rapidly rising town and district in the whole of the colonies" was advertised for sale. During the 1860s and 1870s, Rockhampton developed as the main port for the developing Central Queensland hinterland, the main export at that time being wool.

A Primitive Methodist Church opened in Fitzroy Street, Rockhampton, in January 1864.

=== Gold rushes and expansion ===
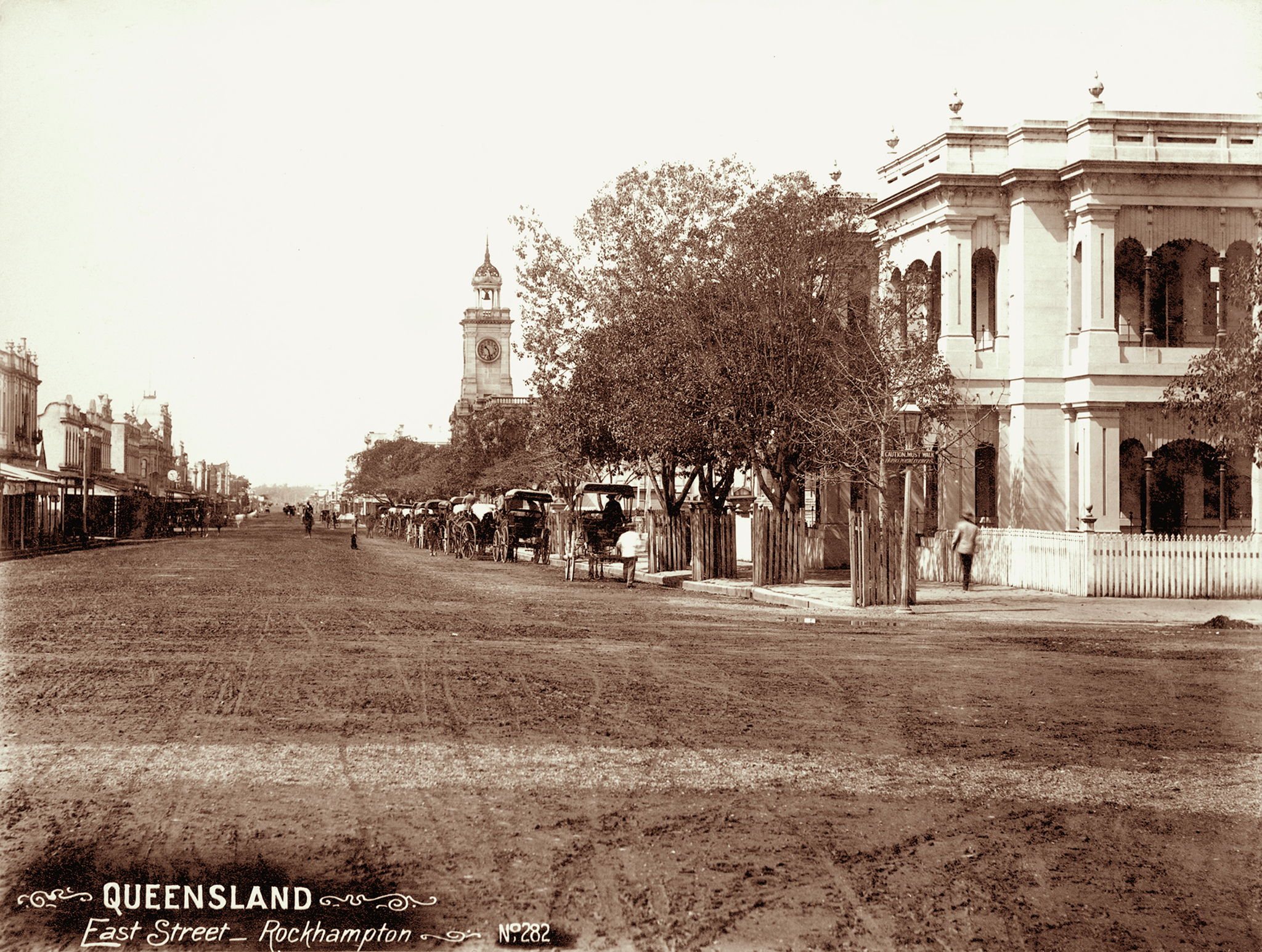
Tree lined residences along East street

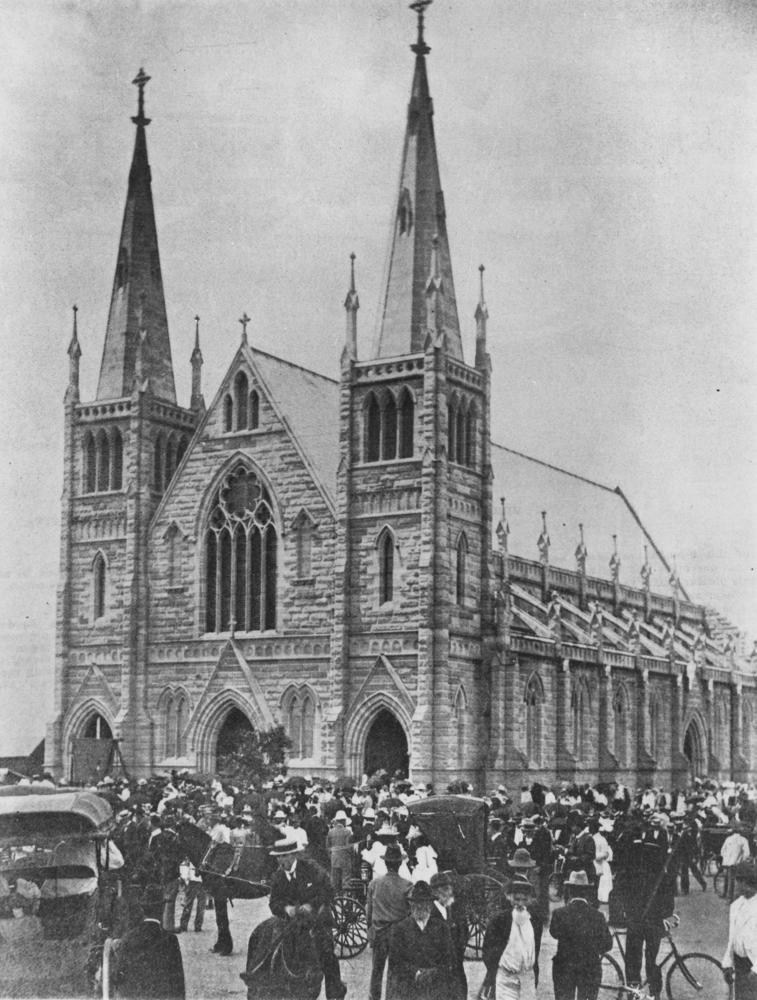
St Joseph's Cathedral, October 1899

In the 1880s and 1890s, sea ports were established on the coast, adjacent to the mouth of the Fitzroy River. Broadmount was on the northern side and Port Alma on the south. Railways were subsequently constructed to carry goods to the wharves at these locations, with the railway to Broadmount opening on 1 January 1898 and the line to Port Alma opening on 16 October 1911. Maintenance on the Broadmount line ceased in August 1929. The following month, the wharf caught fire and the line was effectively closed in July 1930. The line to Port Alma closed on 15 October 1986.

The significant gold deposit at Mount Morgan to the southwest was discovered in the 1880s, and Rockhampton became the main port through which the wealth of Mount Morgan gold was channelled. Due to the wealth of Mount Morgan, Rockhampton weathered the severe economic depression of the 1890s, and many of the town's substantial brick and stone public buildings date from this period. The historic streetscape of Quay Street still displays a number of substantial historic buildings, built when Rockhampton was envisaged as being capital of a state of North Queensland. Most prominent of these is the sandstone Customs House (1900), which today houses an information centre. Other important 19th-century buildings include the Post Office (1892), the Supreme Court House (1888), and St Joseph's Cathedral (1892).

In September 1892 the Anglican Church in Rockhampton was the first new building in Rockhampton to be lit by electricity from the new gasworks. It was also the first church in Australia to be lit with electricity.

=== Central Queensland Separation Movement ===
In 1889, the people of Rockhampton established the Central Queensland Territorial Separation League, a secessionist movement with the intentions of breaking away from the state of Queensland. The core argument of movement was that the seat of government, Brisbane was in the south-east corner of the State. It was so far removed from substantial portions of the state that these areas and their citizens were left disadvantaged and neglected as political and economic interests focused on the south. Supplementing the Central Queensland Territorial Separation League, the women of Rockhampton established their own separation league in October 1892. The inaugural meeting of the Women's Central Queensland Territorial Separation League was held at the Rockhampton School of Arts and attended by 200 women.

Their main focus was preparing a petition to Queen Victoria. The introductory text set out their grievances and described the immense size of Queensland: being twelve times the area of England and Wales, and larger than France, Germany, Spain and Portugal combined. The State Library of Queensland holds the original petition, signed by over 3,000 women who were in support of Central Queensland becoming a separate state. The petition was forwarded to Queen Victoria but was dismissed by the Premier of Queensland, Sir Samuel Walker Griffith.

=== 20th century ===
The City of Rockhampton was proclaimed in 1902. The rail connection south to Brisbane was completed in 1903, but it was not until 1921 that the northern connection to Mackay was finally completed. A railway west from Rockhampton was started in 1867 and by 1892 had reached the terminus at Longreach, 700 kilometres (430 mi) away. This further strengthened Rockhampton's role as the port for the whole of Central Queensland.

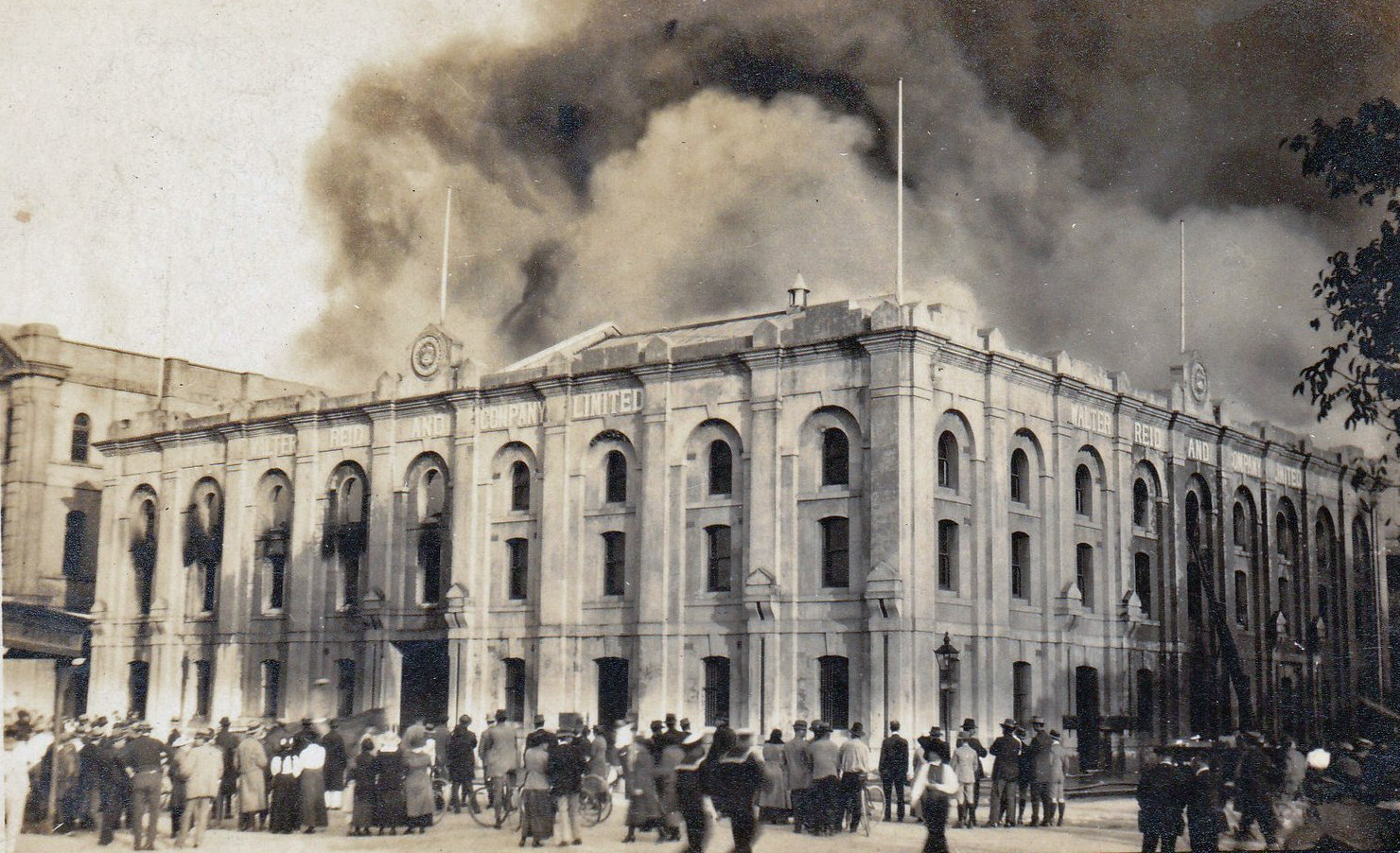
Crowds watching the fire in the Walter Reid & Company Building, January 1918

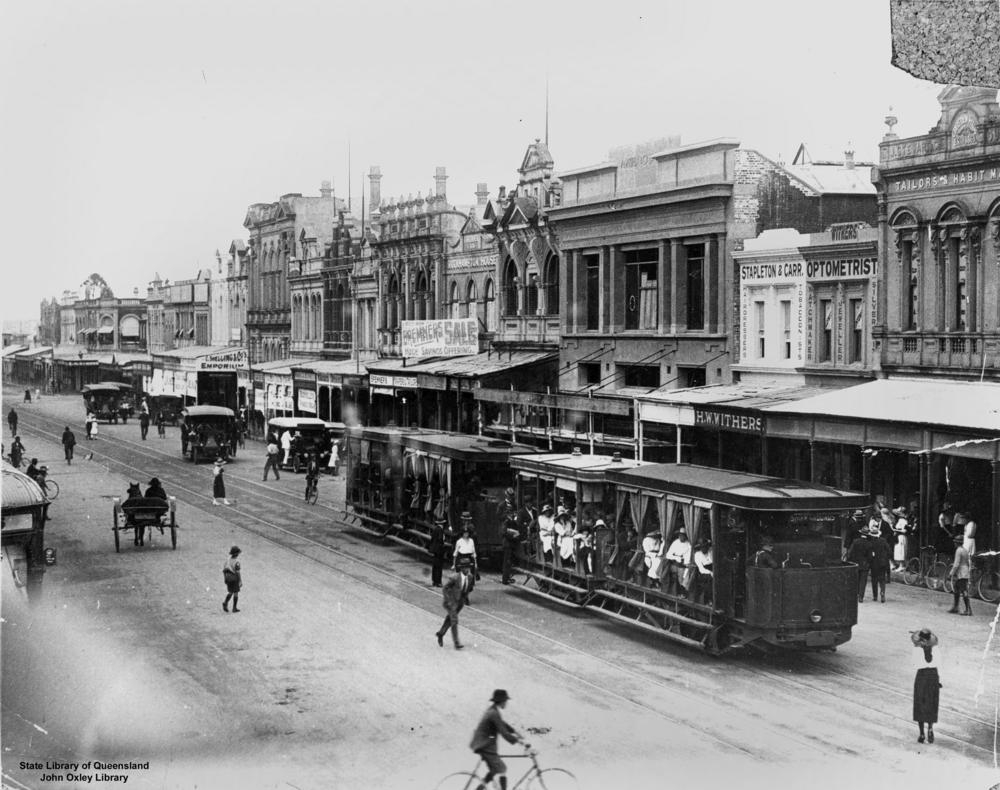
East street, 1923

A passenger tramway began operating on 16 June 1909, making Rockhampton the only provincial city in Queensland to have a street tramway. Purrey steam trams ran on a number of routes throughout South Rockhampton, totalling 10 kilometres (6.2 mi) of track. The discomfort of passengers riding in steam trams in a tropical climate in part led to their demise in 1939, replaced by a bus network run by the City Council.

Strong shaking was felt in Rockhampton when the "Great Queensland Earthquake of 1918" occurred on 7 June 1918. The earthquake was felt from Mackay in the north, to Grafton in New South Wales, and west to Charleville. Estimated to have reached a 6.0 magnitude, the earthquake caused some damage to buildings including chimney stacks crumbling, plaster being dislodged from walls and ceilings, water tanks bursting and trees being uprooted. Houses and buildings experienced considerable swaying with crockery smashing on the floor and pictures falling off walls. The 1918 earthquake remains as the largest to have ever hit Queensland since European settlement.

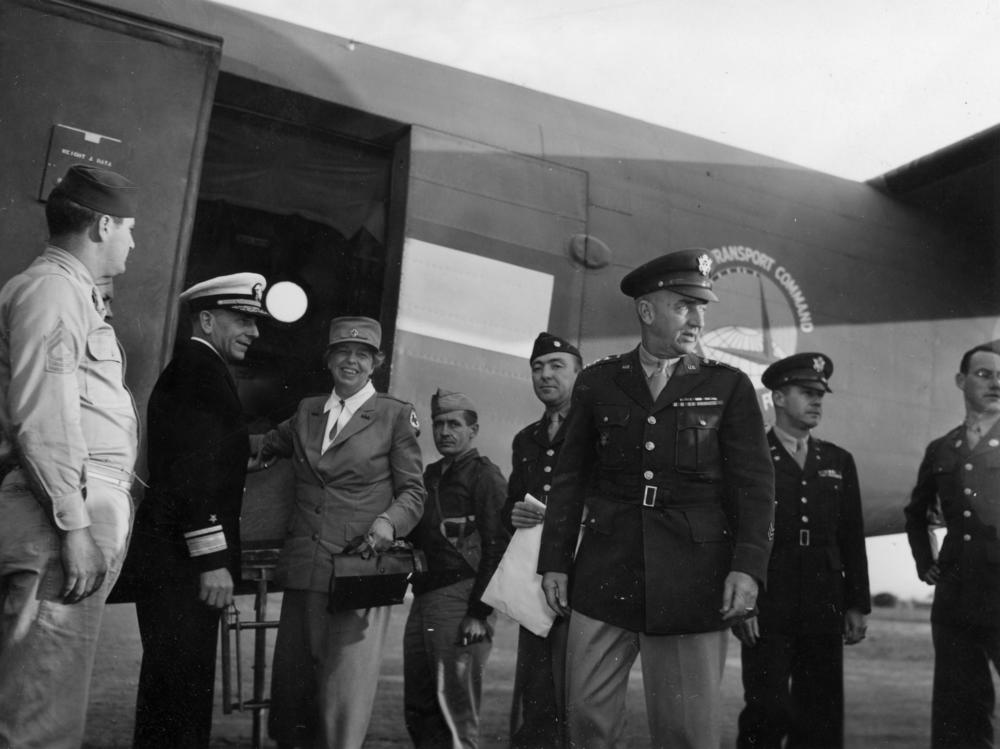
Eleanor Roosevelt arriving in Rockhampton during World War II, 9 September 1943

Restaurant proprietors, Emanuel, William and Nicholas Economos, trading as the Economos Bros., ran their business in East Street, Rockhampton. East Street was a bustling metropolis when the brothers opened their traditional Greek café in the 1920s. Previously known as the Australian Café, the brothers renamed it the Busy Bee Café.

During the Second World War, a US army base was established outside of Rockhampton. It hosted up to 70,000 servicemen en route to action in the Pacific and New Guinea.

On 2 March 1949, Rockhampton was severely damaged by a cyclone.

The Fitzroy River Barrage was commissioned in 1971. The barrage has a capacity of 81,300 megalitres and holds back a lake 60 kilometres (37 mi) long. The barrage was funded by the Rockhampton City Council to provide a reliable source of water to the city, and to effectively drought proof Rockhampton. In 2002, a study showed that salinity was increasing in the Fitzroy Basin and, while only small areas of land were severely affected by salinity, urged that steps be taken to manage salinity by good irrigation practices and better management of tree clearing.

In 1989, two bombs exploded inside the Shark Nightclub, causing injuries and extensive damage to the building. In 1990, the Factory Nightclub was also damaged by a bomb. It is not known who planted the bombs.

=== 21st century ===
In 2003, Rockhampton was the centre of significant national media interest after local teenager Natasha Ryan was found in the North Rockhampton home of her boyfriend, Scott Black, after being missing for five years. Serial killer Leonard Fraser had been charged with her murder, as her disappearance occurred in the period in which Fraser had abducted and murdered other women and girls. An anonymous tip-off during Fraser's trial led to the discovery of Ryan. Despite Ryan's discovery, Fraser's defence did not seek a mistrial and Fraser was convicted of the murders of other women and girls and was given an indefinite life sentence.

On 20 February 2015, Rockhampton was severely damaged by Cyclone Marcia damaging hundreds of homes and businesses with wind speeds over 150 kilometres per hour (93 mph) recorded in Rockhampton. Major flooding was experienced in the upper reaches of the Fitzroy River after more than 250mm were recorded. The cyclone left about 100,000 properties across Central Queensland without power.

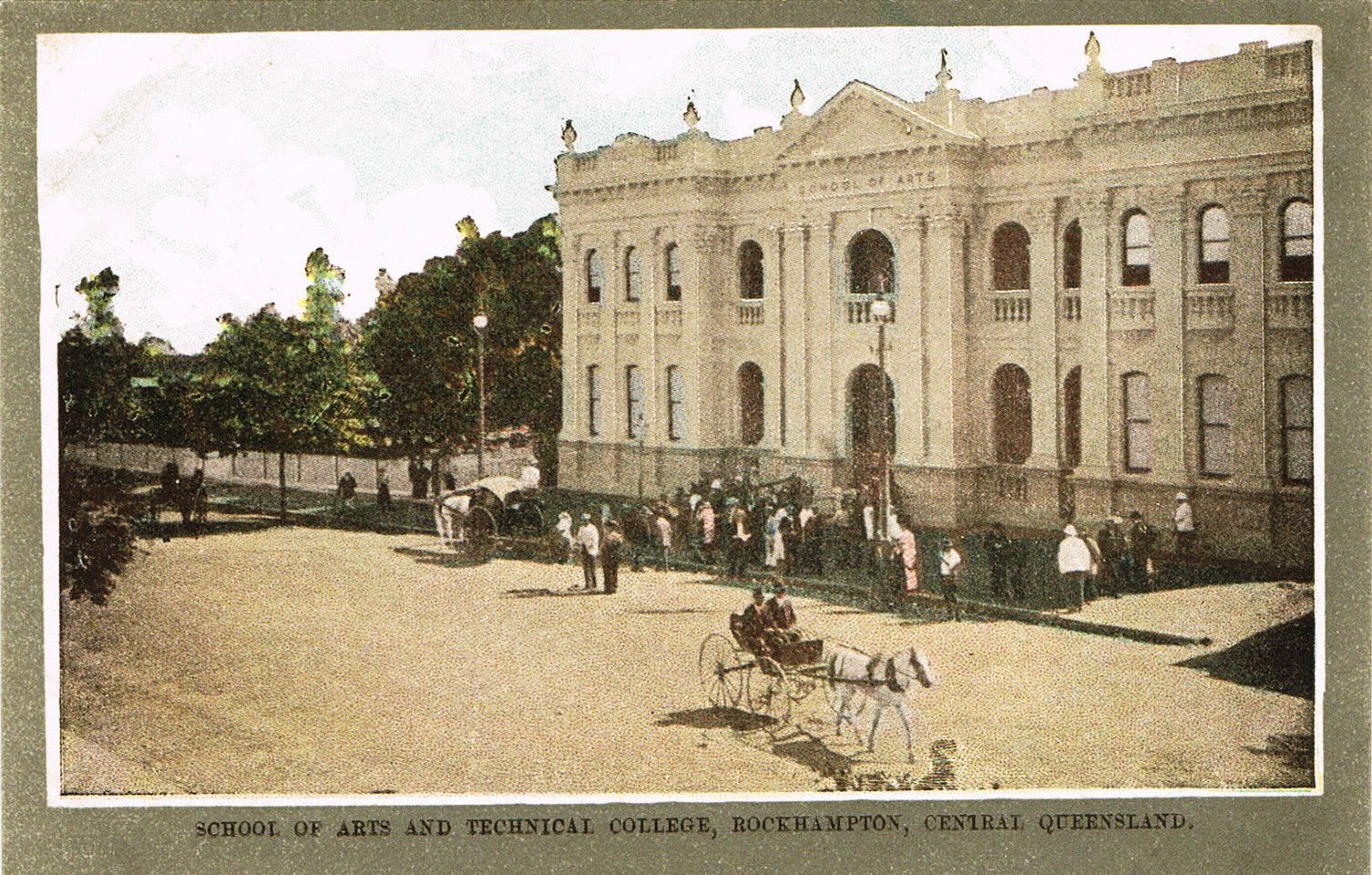
Rockhampton School of Arts, 1908

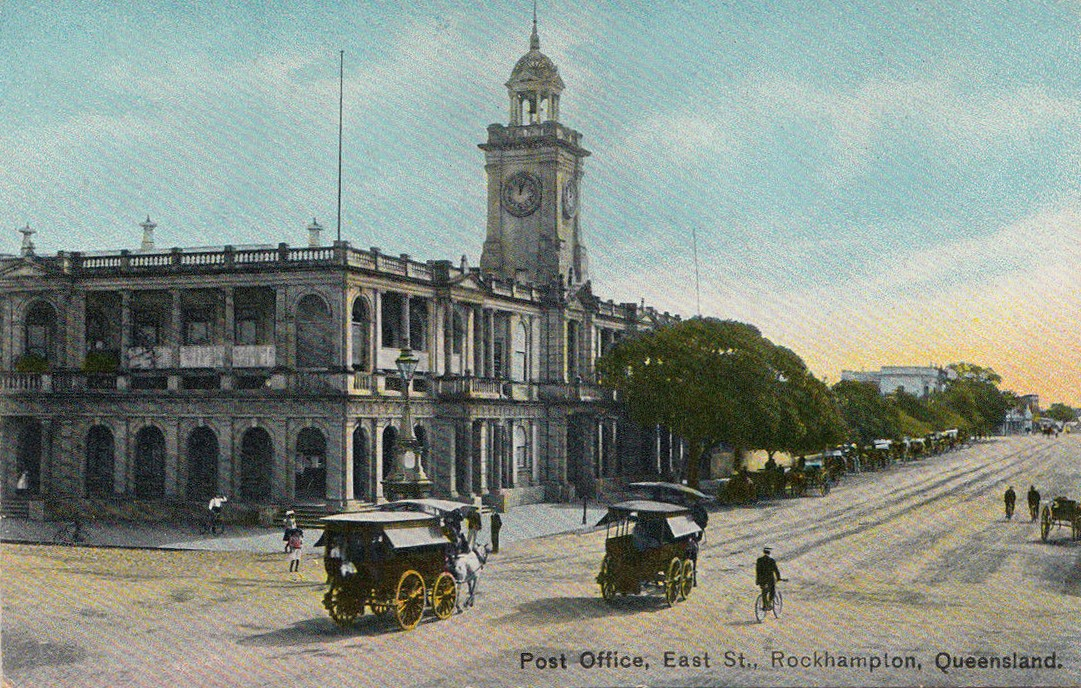
Rockhampton Post Office, East Street, January 1910

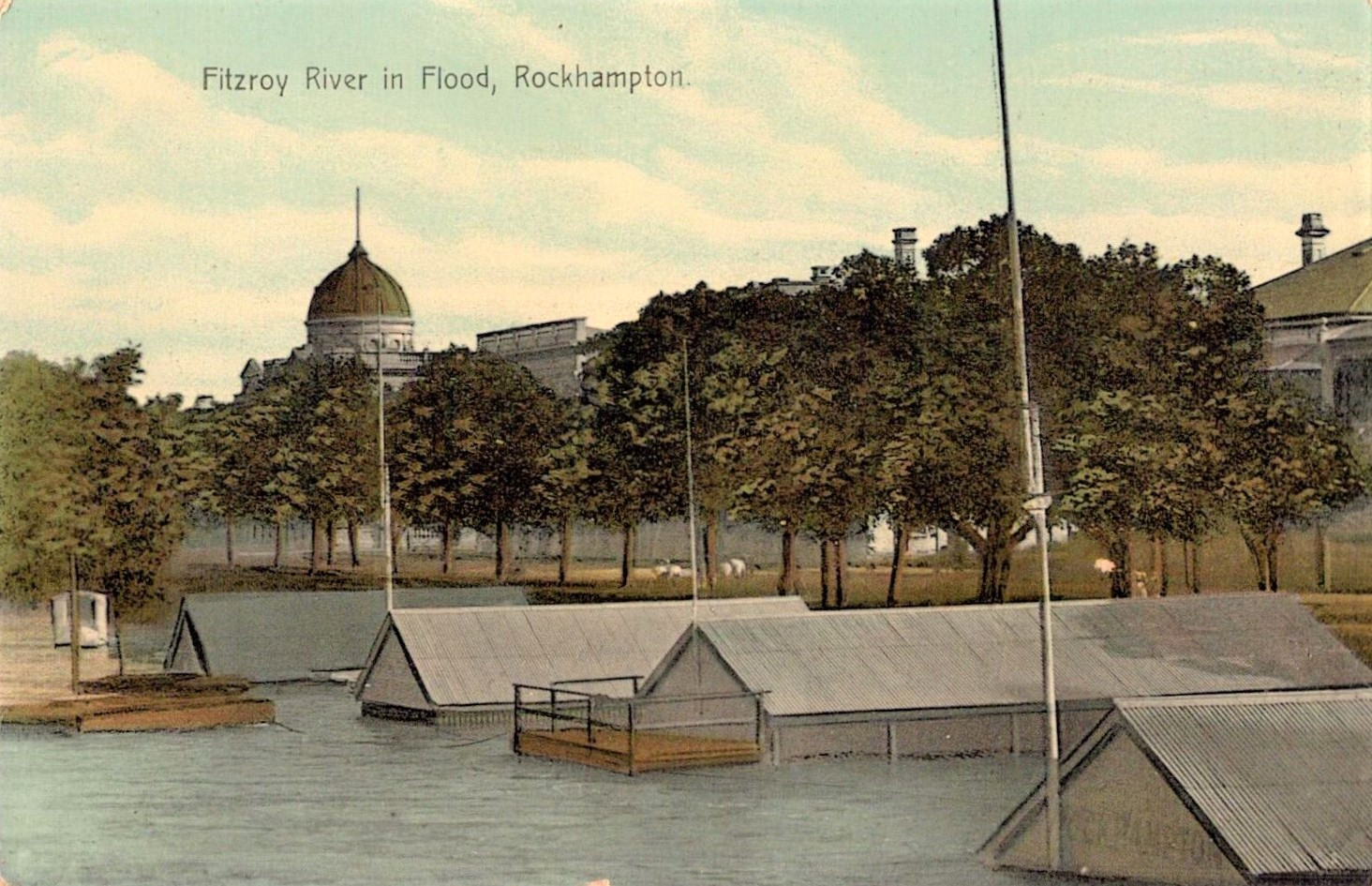
The Fitzroy river in flood with Quay street in background, 1910

== Demographics ==
In the 2016 census, there were 76,985 people in Rockhampton. Aboriginal and Torres Strait Islander people made up 7.2% of the population. 82.8% of people were born in Australia. The next most common countries of birth were New Zealand 1.4%, England 1.3%, Philippines 1.1%, India 0.6% and Vietnam 0.4%.

In 2016, 86.4% of people spoke only English at home. Other languages spoken at home included Vietnamese 0.5%, Tagalog 0.5%, Portuguese 0.3%, Filipino 0.3% and Mandarin 0.3% The most common responses for religion were Catholic 26.5%, No Religion 22.6% and Anglican 17.1%.

== Geography ==
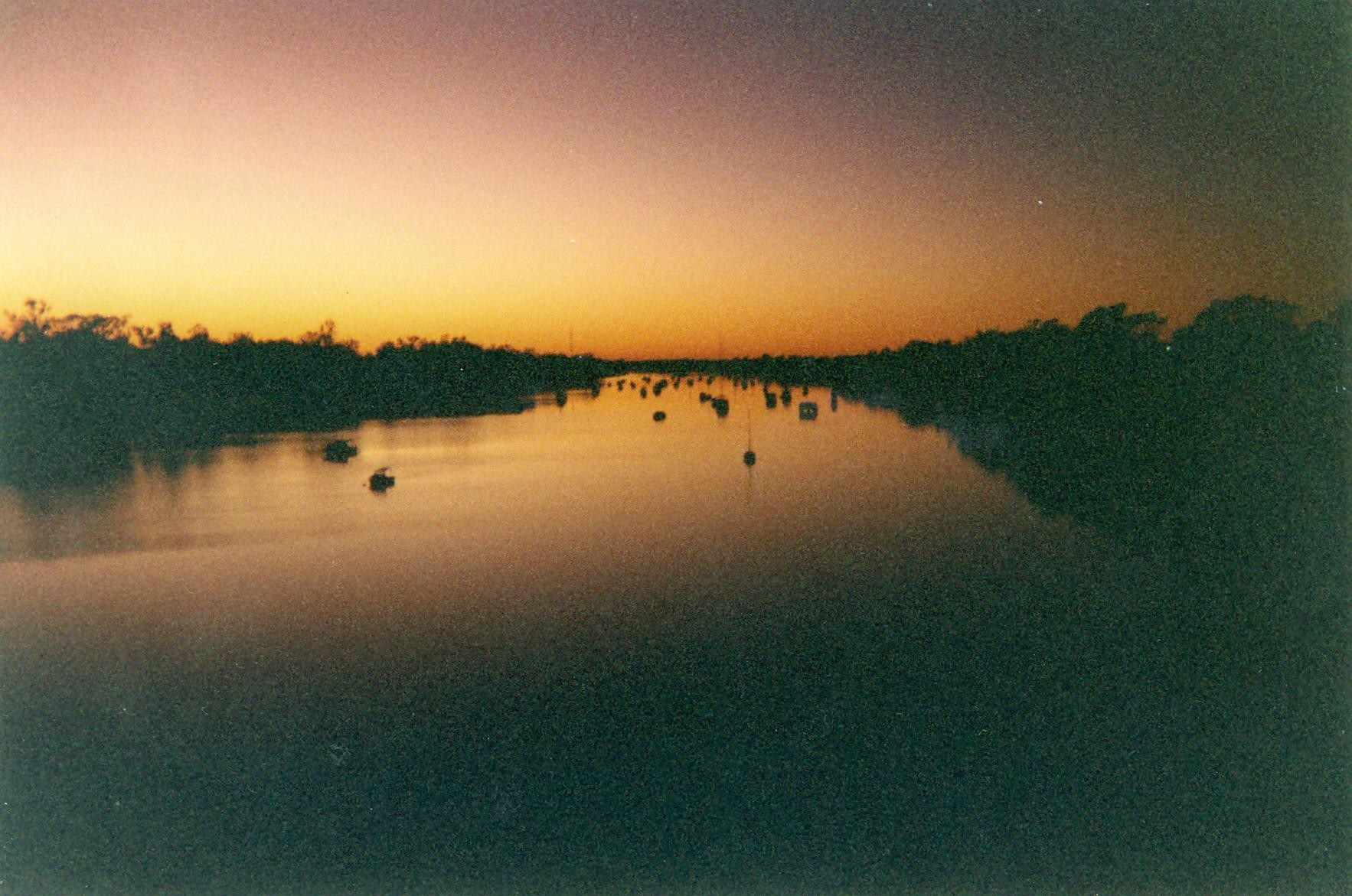
Fitzroy River

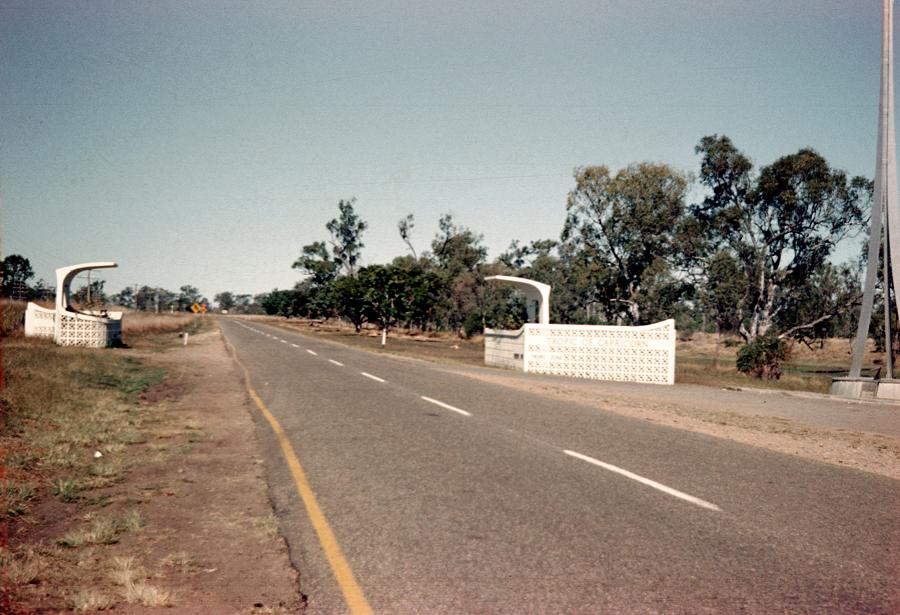
Tropic of Capricorn monuments in Rockhampton, 1970

The town lies on the Fitzroy River, approximately 45 kilometres (28 mi) from where the river enters the Coral Sea, and some 600 kilometres (370 mi) north of the state capital, Brisbane. Rockhampton has a north and south side with three bridges connecting the two sides, one for trains and two for vehicles and people.

Rockhampton lies just north of the Tropic of Capricorn in Central Queensland. A sculpture originally marking the latitude was later moved into town to be more accessible to tourists. Although the Tropic of Capricorn is represented on maps as a "dotted line" that lies at 23° 26' 22", there is actually a bio-geographical overlap of Tropical and Temperate zones more than 500 kilometres (310 mi) wide; Rockhampton is roughly at its centre on the East Coast of Australia.

The city is located on the banks of the Fitzroy River, approximately 40 kilometres (25 mi) from the river mouth. The Berserker Range lies on the eastern side of the city, with the Athelstane Range to the west. The coastal area to the east of the city is known as the Capricorn Coast, with the rapidly growing town of Yeppoon its major centre.

=== Climate ===
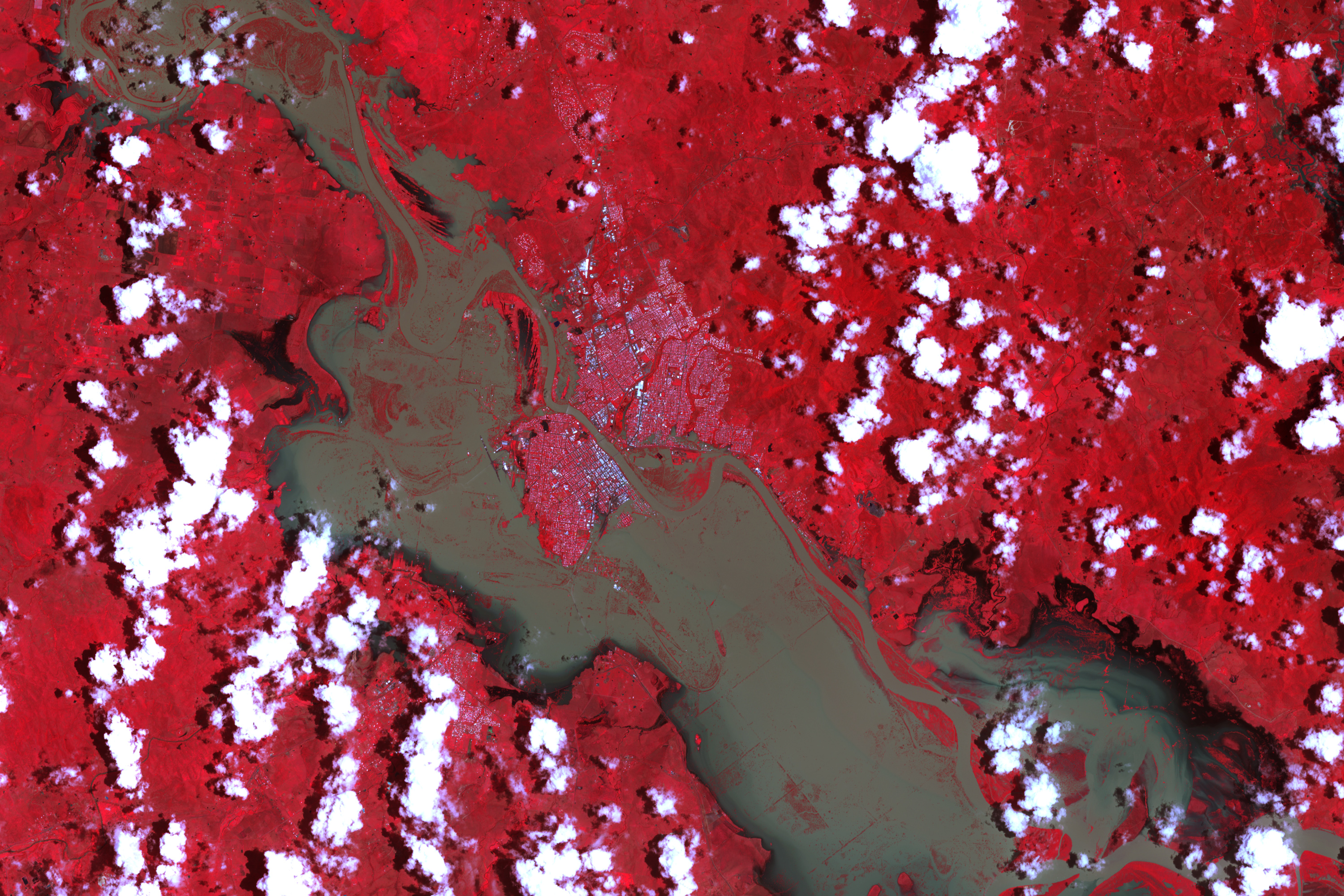
The swollen Fitzroy River, which surrounded the western half of Rockhampton in early 2011.

Rockhampton has a humid subtropical climate (Köppen: Cfa/Cwa) with hot, humid summers and very mild, relatively dry winters with cool nights. The city has 116.3 days of clear skies annually, primarily in winter. The highest recorded temperature in Rockhampton was 45.3 °C (113.5 °F). The lowest was −1.0 °C (30.2 °F). The highest recorded 24-hour rainfall total was 348.0 millimetres (13.70 in) due to the January 2013 Eastern Australia floods.

In summer, Rockhampton is subject to summer thunderstorms. Lying within the cyclone risk zone, it has experienced several large floods cyclones since European settlement. The Fitzroy River has a lengthy, well documented history of flood records dating back to 1859. The highest recorded flood occurred in January 1918, and reached 10.11 m (33.2 ft). In the 2010–2011 Queensland floods, the Fitzroy River peaked at 9.2 metres.

Climate data for Rockhampton (23º22'48"S, 150º28'48"E, 10 m AMSL) (1991–2020, 1939–present)
Month	Jan	Feb	Mar	Apr	May	Jun	Jul	Aug	Sep	Oct	Nov	Dec	Year
Record high °C (°F)	42.5 (108.5)	43.3 (109.9)	42.1 (107.8)	36.6 (97.9)	34.4 (93.9)	32.3 (90.1)	30.6 (87.1)	35.1 (95.2)	37.2 (99.0)	41.1 (106.0)	45.3 (113.5)	41.9 (107.4)	45.3 (113.5)
Mean maximum °C (°F)	38.1 (100.6)	36.3 (97.3)	35.7 (96.3)	33.1 (91.6)	30.2 (86.4)	28.1 (82.6)	27.9 (82.2)	29.7 (85.5)	33.6 (92.5)	36.0 (96.8)	36.9 (98.4)	38.4 (101.1)	39.9 (103.8)
Mean daily maximum °C (°F)	32.6 (90.7)	32.0 (89.6)	31.2 (88.2)	29.2 (84.6)	26.6 (79.9)	24.2 (75.6)	23.9 (75.0)	25.5 (77.9)	28.4 (83.1)	30.1 (86.2)	31.6 (88.9)	32.6 (90.7)	29.0 (84.2)
Daily mean °C (°F)	27.7 (81.9)	27.4 (81.3)	26.3 (79.3)	23.9 (75.0)	20.7 (69.3)	18.1 (64.6)	17.3 (63.1)	18.5 (65.3)	21.5 (70.7)	23.9 (75.0)	25.8 (78.4)	27.2 (81.0)	23.2 (73.7)
Mean daily minimum °C (°F)	22.7 (72.9)	22.7 (72.9)	21.3 (70.3)	18.6 (65.5)	14.8 (58.6)	11.9 (53.4)	10.6 (51.1)	11.4 (52.5)	14.6 (58.3)	17.7 (63.9)	19.9 (67.8)	21.7 (71.1)	17.3 (63.2)
Mean minimum °C (°F)	19.9 (67.8)	20.1 (68.2)	17.6 (63.7)	13.7 (56.7)	7.7 (45.9)	4.8 (40.6)	4.1 (39.4)	4.7 (40.5)	8.7 (47.7)	12.3 (54.1)	15.7 (60.3)	18.3 (64.9)	3.4 (38.1)
Record low °C (°F)	16.3 (61.3)	16.2 (61.2)	11.0 (51.8)	4.7 (40.5)	2.9 (37.2)	−1.0 (30.2)	−0.9 (30.4)	−0.3 (31.5)	3.4 (38.1)	7.0 (44.6)	9.4 (48.9)	10.6 (51.1)	−1.0 (30.2)
Average rainfall mm (inches)	104.1 (4.10)	135.0 (5.31)	89.1 (3.51)	34.8 (1.37)	31.2 (1.23)	36.5 (1.44)	30.0 (1.18)	27.7 (1.09)	24.9 (0.98)	50.7 (2.00)	57.7 (2.27)	95.2 (3.75)	716.9 (28.23)
Average rainy days (≥ 1 mm)	7.6	9.1	5.9	3.8	3.3	3.9	2.5	2.4	2.5	4.3	4.6	6.7	56.6
Average afternoon relative humidity (%) (at 3 pm)	52	55	49	47	44	44	39	37	37	40	43	48	45
Average dew point °C (°F)	19.1 (66.4)	19.7 (67.5)	17.4 (63.3)	14.5 (58.1)	11.2 (52.2)	8.9 (48.0)	7.0 (44.6)	7.2 (45.0)	9.4 (48.9)	12.7 (54.9)	14.9 (58.8)	17.6 (63.7)	13.3 (56.0)
Source: Bureau of Meteorology (Dew point for 3pm)

== Heritage listings ==
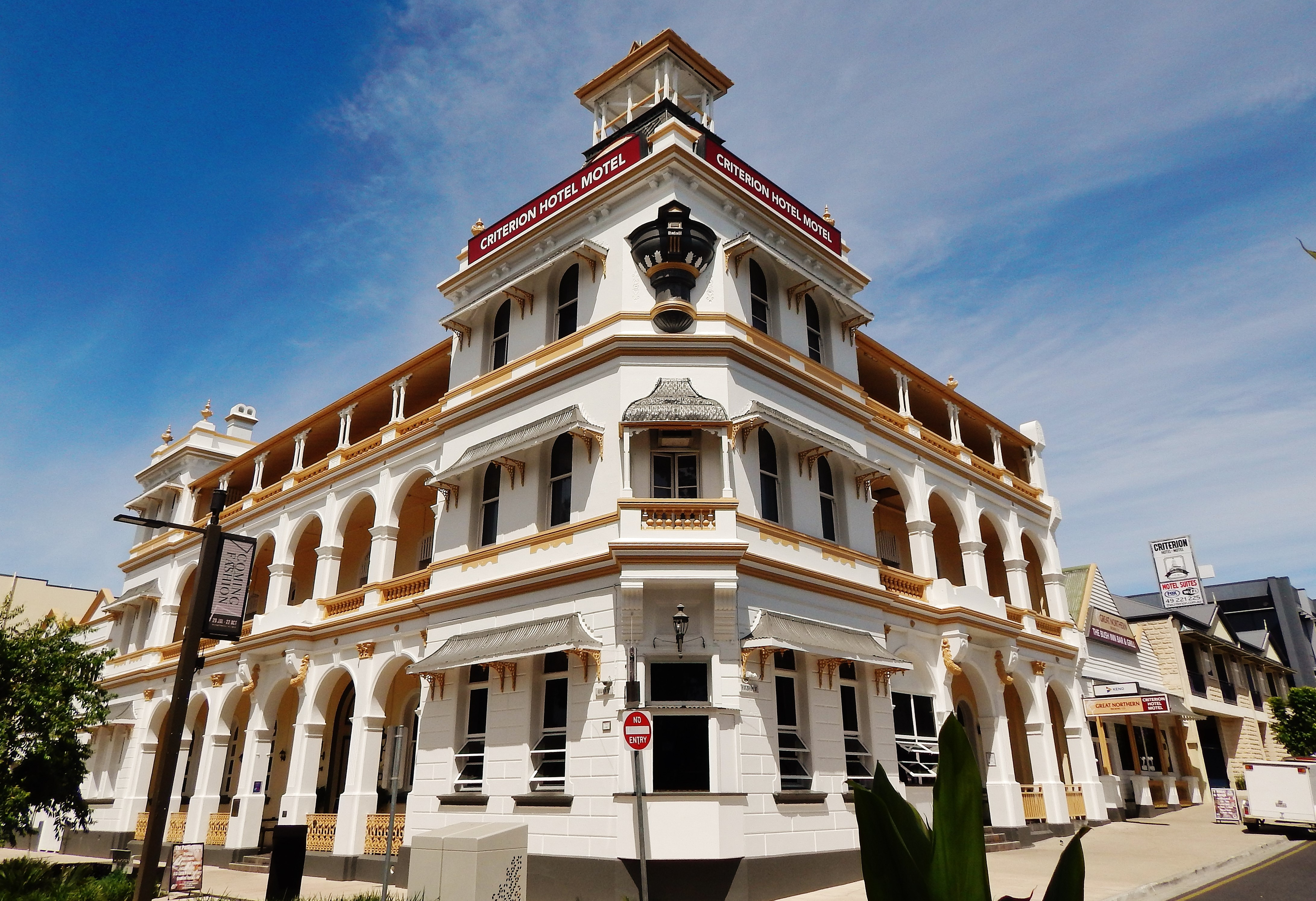
Criterion Hotel

Rockhampton has a number of heritage-listed sites. For details see the List of heritage listed buildings in Rockhampton.

== Governance ==
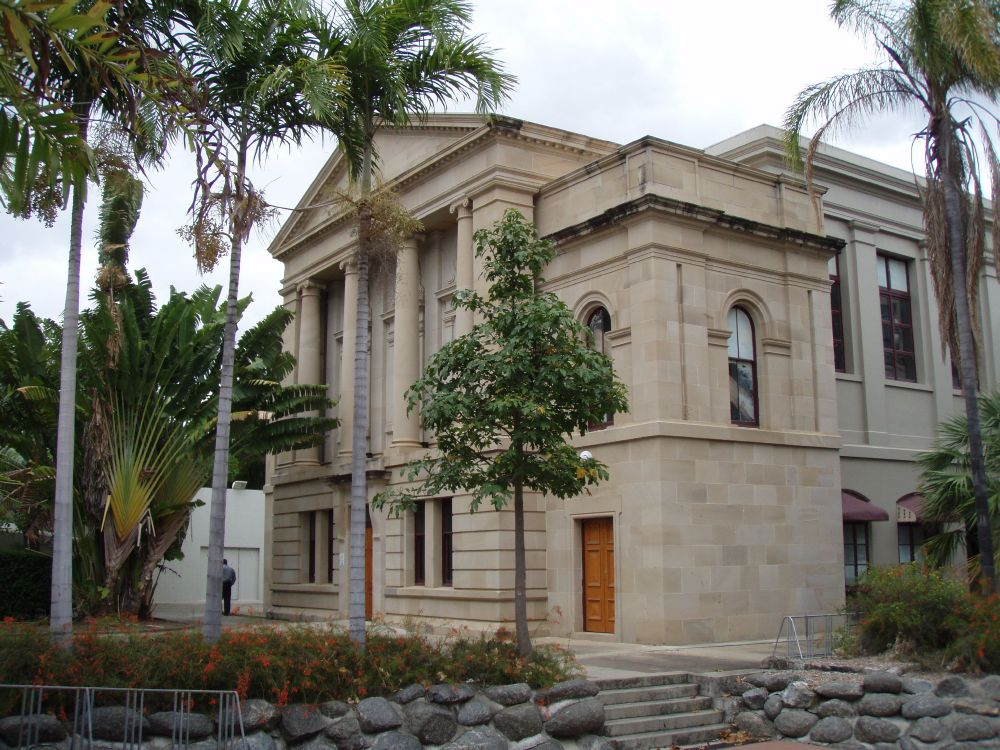
Rockhampton Supreme Court

Tony Williams is the mayor after the 2021 mayoral by-election, following the resignation of long time mayor Margaret Strelow.

The Rockhampton Regional Council area was formed as a result of the 2008 amalgamation of four local government areas. These were the original City of Rockhampton which comprised most of the Rockhampton metropolitan area, the Shire of Fitzroy comprising Gracemere and surrounding districts, and the Shire of Mount Morgan around the town of Mount Morgan itself. The fourth local government area was the Shire of Livingstone which comprised the adjacent coastal towns and hinterland to the east and north of Rockhampton as well as some outlying Rockhampton suburbs. However, Livingstone Shire de-amalgamated from Rockhampton Region in 2014 following a referendum in 2013.

Proposed boundary changes between Rockhampton Regional Council and Livingstone Shire Council are under review by the Local Government Change Commission. The changes relate to three suburbs contiguous with Rockhampton City which are presently part of Livingstone Shire. The proposed changes will affect 1170 properties in the suburbs of Glenlee, Rockyview, and Glendale.

== Economy ==
=== Agriculture ===
The agricultural sector, specifically the cattle trade, is a dominant industry in Central Queensland. The latter has been visually represented around Rockhampton City with a set of seven large statues of bulls known as the "Big Bulls".

Two large abattoirs are located on the south-eastern outskirts of Rockhampton provides employment for people living in Rockhampton and also for refugees from overseas who are recruited when the companies experience difficulty finding local workers to fill vacancies.

One meat processing plant is located at Lakes Creek, operated by Teys Australia (a Cargill joint venture) while the JBS meatworks is located at Nerimbera.

The Teys Australia meatworks at Lakes Creek was previously owned by Kerry Packer's Consolidated Meat Group. CMG temporarily closed the facility in 2002. It was reopened in 2004, when Consolidated Meat Group announced they had formed a joint venture with Teys Australia. In 2011, Cargill bought out CMG's share in the company.

Due to drought, floods, general economic conditions and disputes with workers, both facilities have experienced a number of closures over the years including the closure of the Lakes Creek meatworks from 2002 until 2004, but they are both currently operating as normal.

The Central Queensland Livestock Exchange at Gracemere is one of the largest livestock sales facilities in the country, lies just to the west of the city.

Rockhampton promotes itself as the Beef Capital of Australia but the title has been disputed a number of times by the New South Wales town of Casino.

The tri-annual Beef Australia Expo held in the city is a celebration of the local area's cattle industry.

=== Military ===
There is a permanent military presence in Rockhampton with members of the Australian Defence Force based at the Western Street Army Barracks located near the Rockhampton Airport. To the north of the city lies the extensive Shoalwater Bay Military Training Area where large scale ground, air and amphibious operations are regularly conducted.

Due to its close proximity to the training area, the city regularly sees military movements between the Western Street Army Barracks and Shoalwater Bay, and hosts service personnel from overseas when joint military exercises are held. When these exercises occur, Rockhampton sees a noticeable increase in activity from military transport, including from defence aircraft that are frequently seen at Rockhampton Airport throughout the exercise periods.

The local economy is significantly boosted when visiting overseas troops stay in the city while participating in the army exercises.

Military training conducted in the Rockhampton area regularly draws the ire of nomadic peace activists who travel to the city to protest the exercises.

In 2011, during Exercise Talisman Sabre, a protester made his way onto the tarmac at Rockhampton Airport and attacked a $36 million Tiger helicopter with a garden mattock. The man was ordered to stand trial charged with wilful damage and threatening an aircraft but died before the matter went to trial.

=== Tourism ===
Other attractions that are promoted to the tourist market include the Fitzroy River, the Heritage-listed buildings in the CBD, the Rockhampton Heritage Village, the Dreamtime Cultural Centre, the Archer Park Rail Museum, Mount Archer National Park, Rockhampton Botanic Gardens, and Rockhampton Zoo.

A national promotional campaign was launched in 2013 to promote the local area as a premium tourist destination, featuring local singer-songwriter Kate Leahy whose song "We Like" featured as the soundtrack to the television commercials that showed the attractions of Rockhampton and the Capricorn Coast.

=== Other Industry ===
Rail group Aurizon (previously known as QR National) has a large workforce in the city, which is the meeting point for the main north coast rail line and the line to the major coalfields to the west. In October 2015, the company closed its locomotive and maintenance depots in Rockhampton, with forty jobs lost from the Rockhampton site. Management of Aurizon's Rockhampton site was criticised by the Australian Manufacturing Workers Union in 2016 who described it as "appalling", prompting 60 workers to walk off the job citing lack of consultation, lack of adequate training for apprentices, a lack of privacy and unfair demands from management for workers to increase productivity.

The coal fired 1445 megawatt Stanwell Power Station lies at Stanwell, 30 kilometres (19 mi) west of the city, where Stanwell Corporation provides jobs for people living in Rockhampton. The power station currently has a workforce of about 150 employees and regularly hires new apprentices from Rockhampton

Mining – Queensland Magnesia (QMAG)

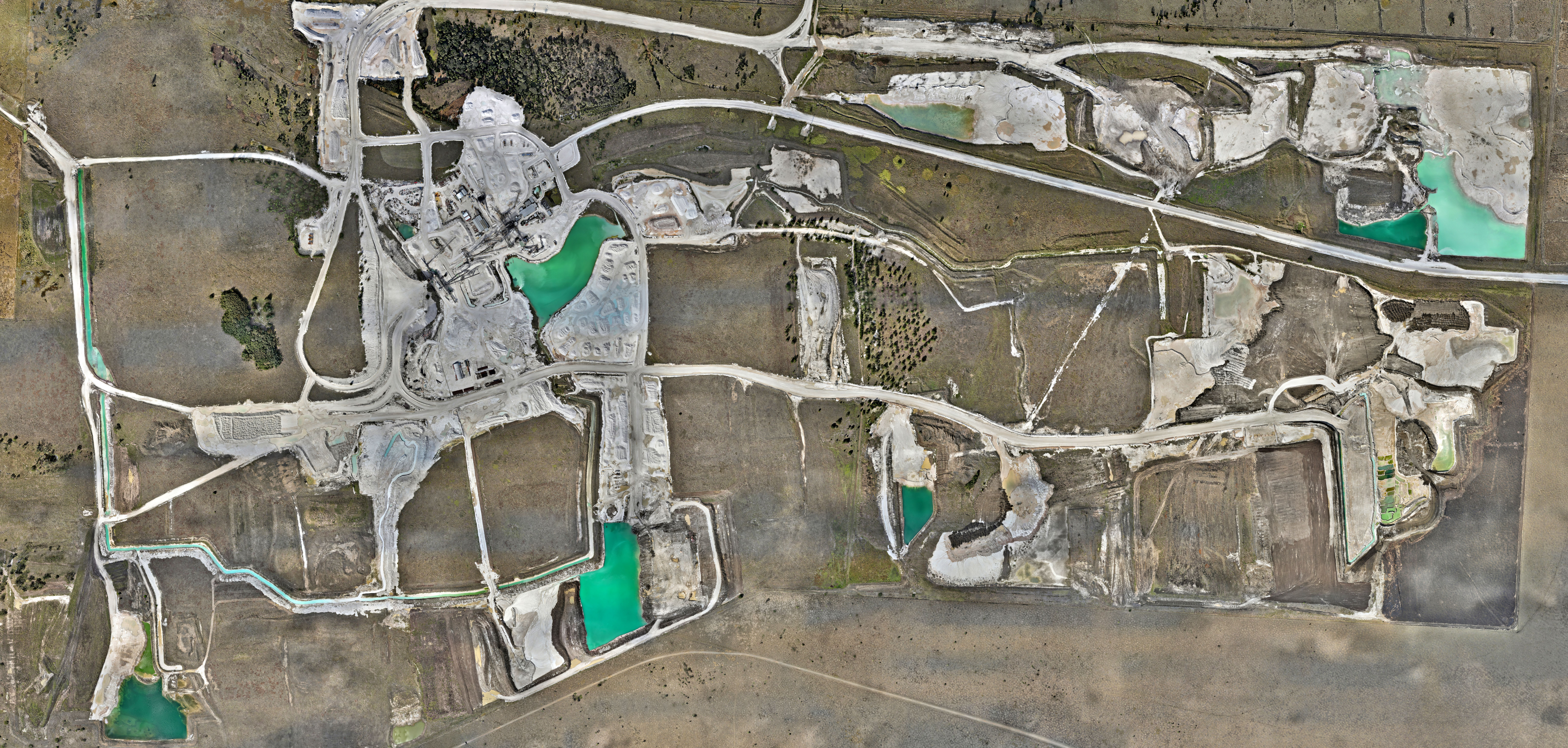
An aerial view of the Kunwarara Mine (KG1)

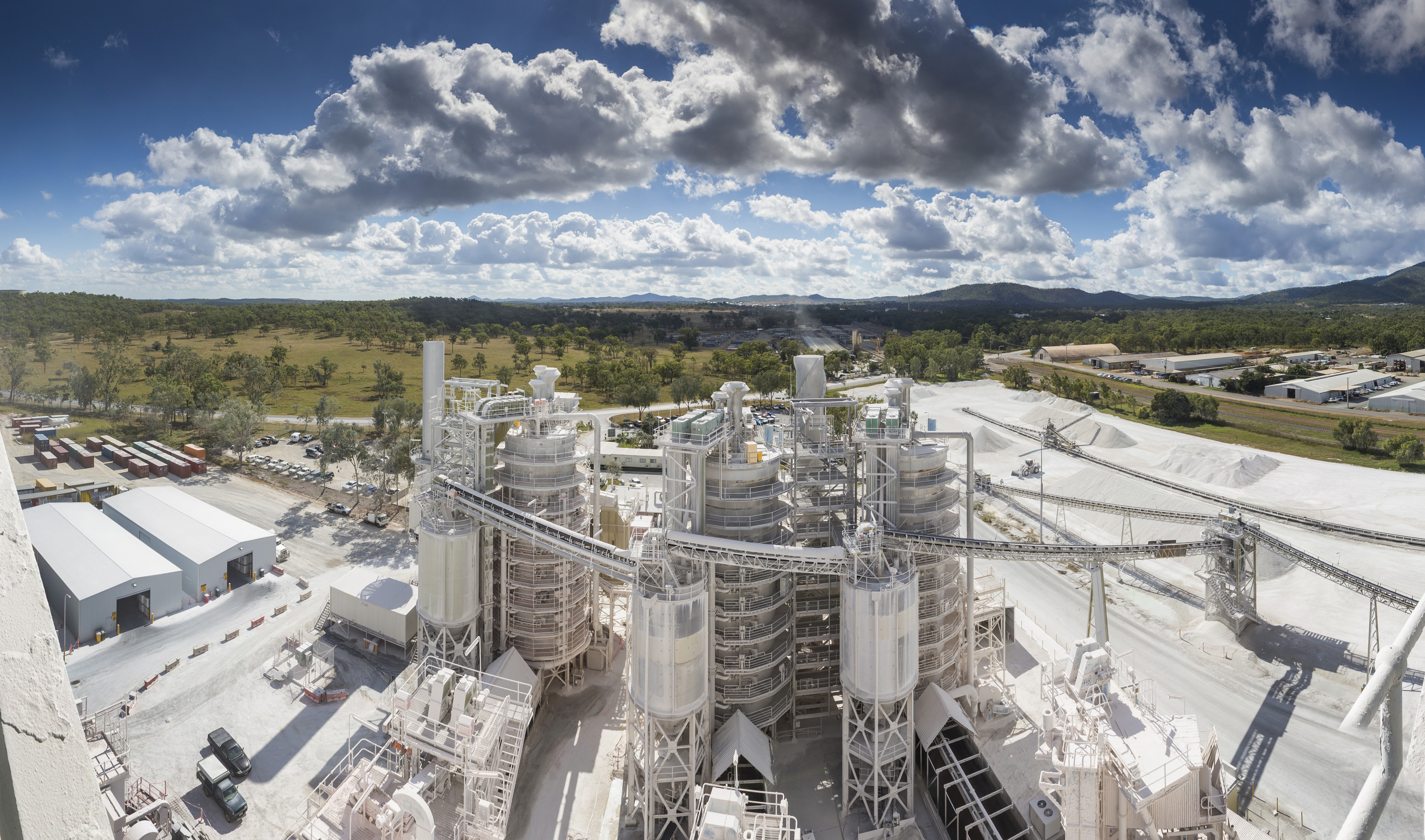
QMAG Processing Plant (Parkhurst)

The magnesia mine is located at Kunwarara (located approximately 81 km north of Rockhampton) and have a processing plant at Parkhurst, which employs over 200 locals. QMAG was purchased by Refratechnik in 2020 from Sibelco.

Headquartered in Munich, the global Refratechnik Group develops, manufactures, and installs high-grade refractories for high-temperature industrial processes. As a systems supplier, Refratechnik offers customised and all-inclusive refractory solutions for all major industrial sectors. Refratechnik also owns Baymag, a sister company to QMAG, producing MgO products for various markets around the world.

== Culture ==
The annual Rockhampton Cultural Festival held each August at the Rockhampton Heritage Village features a variety of market stalls, displays, international foods, music and cultural displays.

The Rockhampton Showgrounds plays host to numerous events each year. Most notably, the three-day Rockhampton Show is held in June each year.

Like many Australian communities, Rockhampton commemorates Anzac Day on 25 April each year. Rockhampton is believed to be the very first city in Australia to hold an early morning commemoration intentionally scheduled to coincide with when the landing at Gallipoli took place, as the city held a "daybreak" service at 6:30 am on 25 April 1916, in which 700 people attended.

In 1893, Alfred Henry Lambton wrote what is recognised as the first crime novel set in Queensland, From Prison to Power. The novel takes place at the fictitious cattle station, Banalba, located 200 miles inland from the important tropical Queensland town of "Rockington" [Rockhampton].

The Rockhampton Art Gallery collection, also owned by the Rockhampton Regional Council, is situated next to the Pilbeam Theatre and consists mainly of works by Australian artists from the 1940s to the 1970s.

Opened in 1985, closed in 2011 and then re-opened in 2015 the Rockhampton Music Bowl regularly plays host to events including the annual Carols by Candlelight every December.

The tri-annual Beef Australia Exposition is held every third May at the Rockhampton Showgrounds. In 2009 as part of the Q150 celebrations, the Beef Australia Expo was announced as one of the Q150 Icons of Queensland for its role as an "event and festival".

Films shot in Rockhampton include The Kid Stakes, Buddies, and Broke.

== Attractions ==
A second public garden, the Kershaw Gardens, was officially opened in 1988 on the site of the former Rockhampton rubbish dump. Located on the Bruce Highway in North Rockhampton, these gardens specialise in Australian native plants, especially those of Central Queensland. The most striking feature of the gardens is the imitation waterfall constructed on the northern boundary of the site (adjacent to the highway), which aims to recreate a scene from the Blackdown Tableland. The Dreamtime Cultural Centre is Australia's largest Cultural Centre and is set on more than 12 hectares (30 acres) of land, with native plants, trees and waterfalls.

== Facilities ==
The Rockhampton Regional Council operates the Rockhampton Regional Library Administration and History Centre in Rockhampton on the corner of William and Alma Streets. Branch libraries are located in Berserker ("Rockhampton North"), Gracemere, Mount Morgan and West Rockhampton ("Anytime" at Rockhampton Airport).

== Education ==
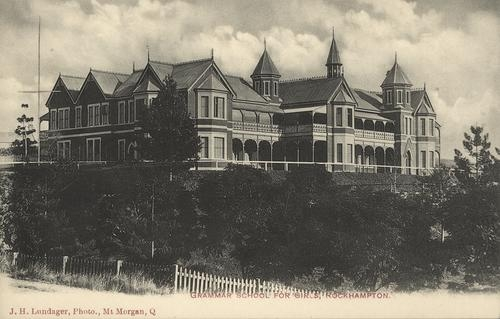
Rockhampton Girls Grammar School ca.1895

CQUniversity Australia was founded in Rockhampton in 1967, however the university now has more than 30,000 students spread across 24 campuses and locations Australia-wide.

== Media ==
=== Newspapers ===
In 2012, a new Rockhampton newspaper called The Queensland Telegraph was launched by Queensland Media Holdings. However, after publishing the newspaper for about a year, the newspaper's management announced on 17 July 2013 that the local newspaper office had closed.

Established in 2006, industrial magazine publication Shift Miner is also produced in Rockhampton with its head office located in the Rockhampton CBD.

=== Radio ===
==== History ====
The first known use of wireless in the Rockhampton vicinity was the wireless equipped (Marconi system) two destroyers (HMS Yarra and HMS Parramatta) of the Australia squadron of the Royal Navy when visiting Rockhampton in May 1911. The group was commanded by Lieutenant G. F. Hyde.

There were at least three licensed (and likely many unlicensed) early wireless experimenters at Rockhampton immediately prior to the outbreak of World War 1: L. Freeman (Callsign: XQB); Robert Henry Berry (Callsign: XQC); and H. A. Shepherd (Callsign: XQD). Operation was on longwave using spark transmission; there was no known use of telephony.

As part of the Australian Coastal Radio Network, station VIR Rockhampton commenced operation on 24 May 1913 from a transmitter site at The Range. The station provided service to coastal shipping in the region between VIB Brisbane and VIT Townsville. It operated on longwave and was a vital part of Australia's defence during World War 1.

A B class licence was granted to the Queensland Government in April 1925 for a Rockhampton station to relay, via landline, its A class station 4QG Brisbane. It was proposed to operate on a wavelength of 323 metres (928.8 kHz) with a transmitter input power of 500 watts (corresponds to a transmitter power of about 150 watts). The station was never implemented.

The earliest known broadcasting service at Rockhampton was an amateur broadcasting station (Callsign: 4DO) operated by local theatre manager Harold Learmonth Hobler. He transmitted basic programmes in late 1924 on a frequency of 1250 kHz. In August and September 1931, 4DO was again testing Sunday night transmissions on 1250 kHz and 1200 kHz, perhaps with a view to a Class B licence for his employer Tivoli Talkies.

Callsign	Frequency	Owner
4RO	990 kHz AM	Grant Broadcasters
4CC	1584 kHz AM	Grant Broadcasters
Triple M Central Queensland	101.5 MHz FM	Southern Cross Austereo
Hit Central Queensland	107.9 MHz FM	Southern Cross Austereo
Triple J	104.7 MHz FM	ABC
Radio National	103.1 MHz FM	ABC
ABC NewsRadio	105.5 MHz FM	ABC
ABC Classic	106.3 MHz FM	ABC
ABC Capricornia	837 kHz AM	ABC
4YOU	98.5 MHz FM	Community
4US	100.7 MHz FM	Community
KIX Country	92.7 MHz FM	Grant Broadcasters
Radio TAB	99.9 MHz FM	UBET
Vision Radio	87.6 MHz FM	United Christian Broadcasters

== Infrastructure ==
=== Water ===
The catchment area of the Fitzroy River is approximately 145,000 square kilometres (almost the size of England). It contains six major rivers, and Rockhampton and Central Queensland accordingly enjoy abundant good water. The existing and future dams under construction ensure on-going needs for agriculture, industry and domestic purposes are met. The Fitzroy River Barrage at Rockhampton separates tidal salt water from upstream fresh water, and provides the supply for Rockhampton's domestic and industrial needs.

=== Power ===
Central Queensland's major generating facilities, including the Stanwell, Gladstone and Callide power stations, produce the majority of the State's power. Queensland's newest and most technologically advanced powerhouse at Stanwell, 28 kilometres (17 mi) west of the city, came on line in 1993. The Stanwell facility is a key element in the State's program to expand electricity supply and is a major exporter of power station technology.

== See also ==
- List of people from Rockhampton
