= Rockhampton Botanic Gardens =

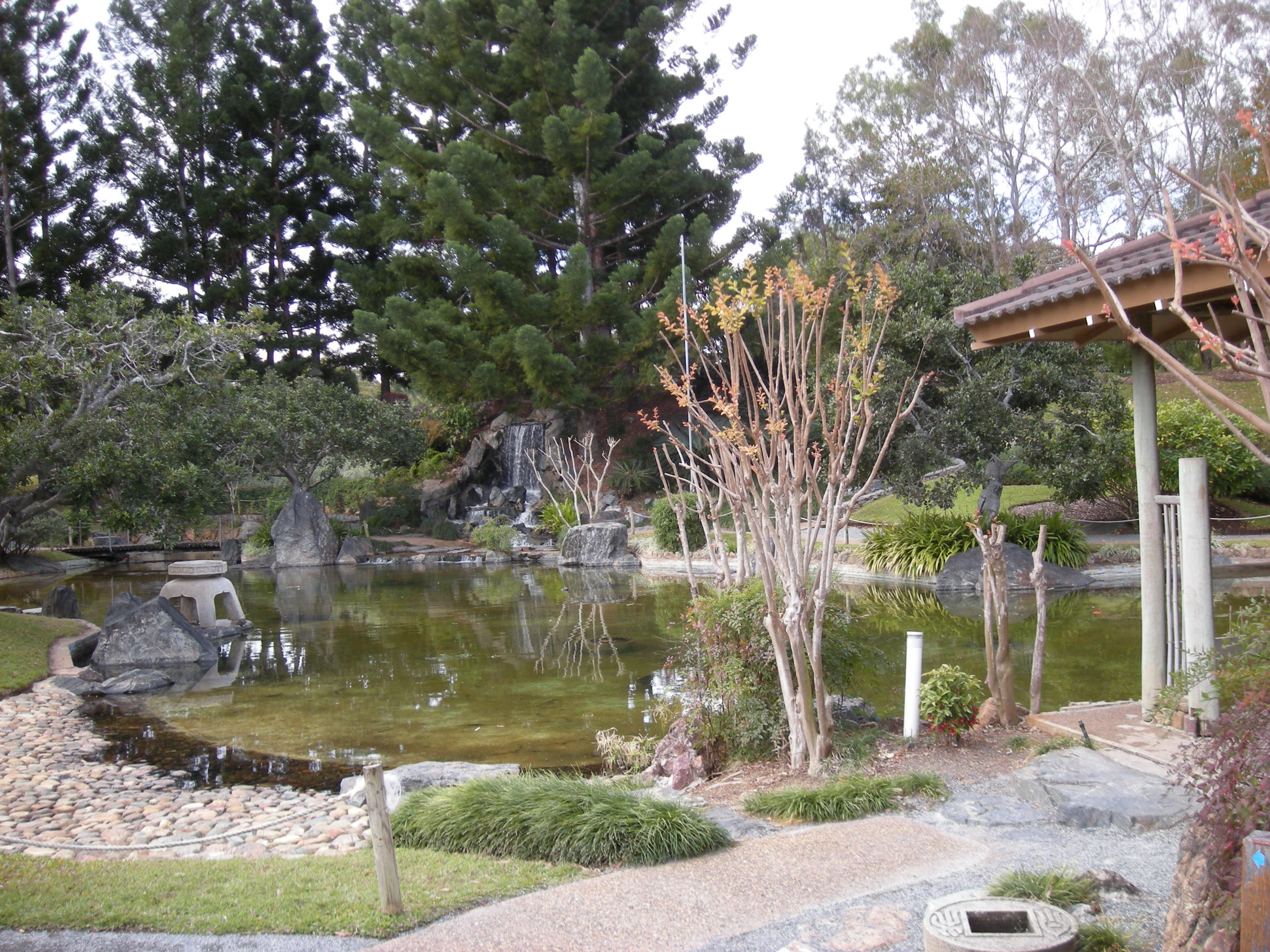
- Japanese Gardens, located within the Rockhampton Botanic Gardens

- Location within Queensland Location within Australia
- 23.4007°S 150.4915°E
- Location: 100 Spencer Street, The Range, Rockhampton, Rockhampton Region, Queensland, Australia

History
- Design period: 1870s–1890s (late 19th century)
- Built: 1873–1930s

Queensland Heritage Register
- Official name: Rockhampton Botanic Gardens
- Type: state heritage (landscape, built)
- Designated: 23 July 1999
- Reference no.: 601819
- Significant period: 1873–1930s (fabric); 1869, 1873 (historical); 1869–ongoing (social)
- Significant components: aviary, gate – entrance, kiosk, fernery, tree groups – avenue of, clock – floral, steps/stairway, memorial – obelisk, orchard, zoological garden, residential accommodation – staff housing, trees/plantings, sports facilities, drainage, clubroom/s / clubhouse

Rockhampton Botanic Gardens is a heritage-listed botanic garden at 100 Spencer Street, The Range, Rockhampton, Rockhampton Region, Queensland, Australia. It was built from 1873 to 1930s. It was added to the Queensland Heritage Register on 23 July 1999.

== History ==
Rockhampton Botanic Gardens are located on a 33-hectare site west of the Athelstane Range and bordered by the Murray Lagoon and Yeppen-Yeppen Lagoon. A series of established gardens combine to create an education and recreation retreat at the southern edge of the city. A complex site, now incorporating both built and natural environments, the Rockhampton Botanic Gardens has enjoyed continuous use since opening in 1873.

The Rockhampton Botanic Gardens was gazetted as a public garden in 1869. Prior to this, from 1861 most of the land that was to be utilised for the gardens was a Native Police barracks. Between 1868 and 1872, three sites were gazetted as botanic gardens for Rockhampton. The influence of Anthelme Thozet, a local botanist and collector, is thought to have prevailed in the selection of the Spencer Street site. The proximity to a constant water supply, in the adjacent Murray Lagoon, and striking vistas from the western slopes of the Athelstane Range were primary considerations for a successful botanic gardens site.

The development of the first ten acres of the 100-acre site commenced after the curator James Scott Edgar took up residence in a modified dairy shed on the grounds in 1873. Edgar was trained in the Royal Botanic Gardens, Kew and this first section to be developed is still known as the lower gardens. Local Botanist Thozet, Ferdinand von Mueller of Melbourne Botanic Gardens and Walter Hill of Brisbane City Botanic Gardens contributed material for the garden. The Queensland Acclimatisation Society was also active in providing plant stock and seed material to the new curator. Edgar maintained a professional link between these and other international botanic gardens, collecting specimens and distributing seed stock developed in Rockhampton as well as receiving plants and seeds for propagation in the gardens.

Plant collections were also distributed for educational purposes with the Rockhampton Botanic Gardens being the key regional distribution point to primary schools for Arbor Day trees. The Rockhampton Botanic Gardens were second only to the Brisbane City Botanic Gardens in the volume of supply; 1000 trees were distributed from the nurseries. The gardens developed experimental and economic botany while also accommodating the recreational needs of the district.

The Murray Lagoon was Rockhampton's original bathing spot. Edgar introduced a diving pontoon and sand to create a beach like atmosphere on the banks of the lagoon. He used bamboo stands to separate the male and female bathing areas, and the original rules and regulations restricted the hours of use at the discretion of the trustees. The Murray Lagoon in the Botanic Gardens was a popular picnic area for the Rockhampton district in the late nineteenth century. The Lagoon provided the necessary water to the gardens and was also part of a broader lagoon system that constituted the original water supply for the city of Rockhampton.

In 1905 the deed of grant for the reserve was issued to the Rockhampton City Council. The reserve was enlarged to 197 acres. By this time Richard Simmons had assumed the role of curator of the gardens and set out to bring the land under cultivation. During his time at the helm, a children's playground, zoo, bandstand and kiosk were added to the recreational facilities available in the gardens.

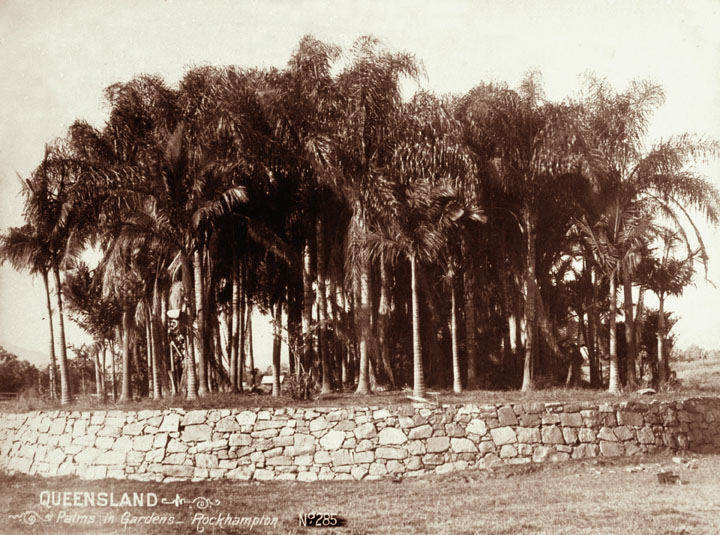
Palms in Rockhampton Botanic Gardens, circa 1897

The kiosk was erected in 1911 and opened on New Year's Day 1912. Rockhampton City Council's chief engineer, Mr G Pennycuick, designed the octagonally shaped building. At a cost of £340, it was open on five sides with two rooms at the rear, the ladies' dressing room and a kitchen/storeroom. A small cupola and a number of decorative gables surmounted the roof. In 1966, the kiosk underwent modifications that included the removal of the roof decorations and the addition of an amenity block for the gardens. Further modifications in 1997, upgraded the catering facilities of the kiosk.

The Queensland Department of Agriculture and Stock financially supported the gardens with an annual grant of between £300 and £500. This was supplemented by annual subscriptions to the Botanic Gardens trust and nursery sales. Simmons's experience as a local nurseryman prior to his appointment as the curator was crucial in maintaining the flow of funds for the gardens. Catalogues of available plants were distributed on a regular basis and orders were taken from throughout the central Queensland area as well as from far afield as the Singapore Botanic Gardens. Links to the international botanic gardens network were maintained.

In the aftermath of the First World War, the Rockhampton Botanic Gardens underwent major changes. The additional land received in 1905 was removed from the reserve to create Diggers Park and a section of the Botanic Gardens was set aside for the War Memorial for Rockhampton and the surrounding district. The Gracemere grey granite memorial obelisk stands on a plinth and is 64 feet (20 m) above the ground. The surrounding grounds were landscaped by Simmons and included a circle of Canary Island date palms (Phoenix canariensis) and topiary borders pruned into ANZAC, Navy, Army and RAAF.

In 1930, the curator's position passed to the deputy curator, H. George Simmons, son of Richard Simmons. During his time as curator, limited financial arrangements impeded the expansion of the gardens and their popularity of the gardens declined. The beachside resorts of Emu Park and Yeppoon had become more easily accessible for the people of Rockhampton. However, it was during this period that the Hugo Lassen Fernery was built in 1938. Hugo Lassen was a local dentist who bequeathed money to the Rockhampton Botanic Gardens. The fernery, a sophisticated cross form bush house, contains extensive rockeries and houses an impressive exotic fern collection. George Simmons is responsible for the avenue of bunya pines (Araucaria bidwillii) and Bougainvillea at the Ann Street entrance. A pinetum developed at this time includes kauri, Radiata and hoop pines, and now large mature trees. Entrance gates commemorating King George V were erected in 1953.

Throughout the history of the Rockhampton Botanic Gardens, labour was sourced from unemployed and itinerant workers. At the turn of the century the labour bureau supplied men to work in the Gardens. During the 1930s, the Intermittent Relief Scheme provided the labour for the extensive stonework throughout the lower gardens, particularly providing culverts and drains for the water course through the centre of the park. In the 1990s the Work for the Dole scheme saw many young unemployed people working alongside staff of the Gardens.

The Rockhampton Botanic Gardens are once again a popular recreational feature for the people of the district. The barbecue and playground areas are busy throughout the week, particularly on the weekends. Although the scientific arm of the gardens is no longer a predominant aspect of the operations, present staff are keen to create links between the Gardens and the University of Central Queensland. The mature nineteenth and early twentieth century planting are indeed spectacular, and the gardens provide a cool leafy oasis in the dry hot tropical climate of Rockhampton.

== Description ==
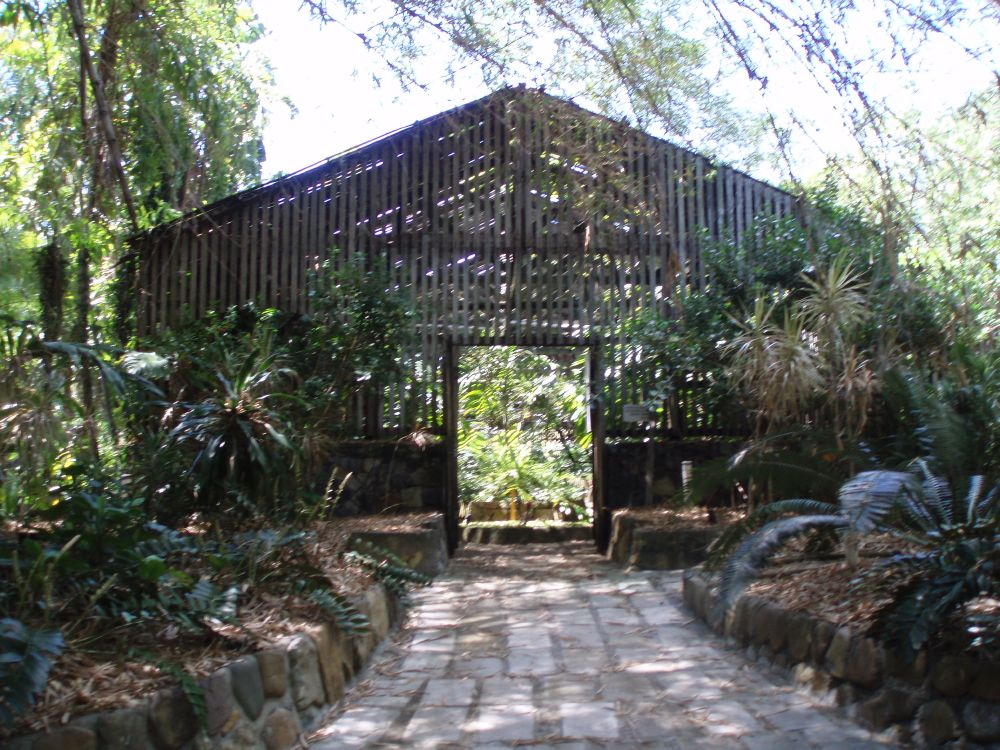
Hugo Lassen Fernery, 2008

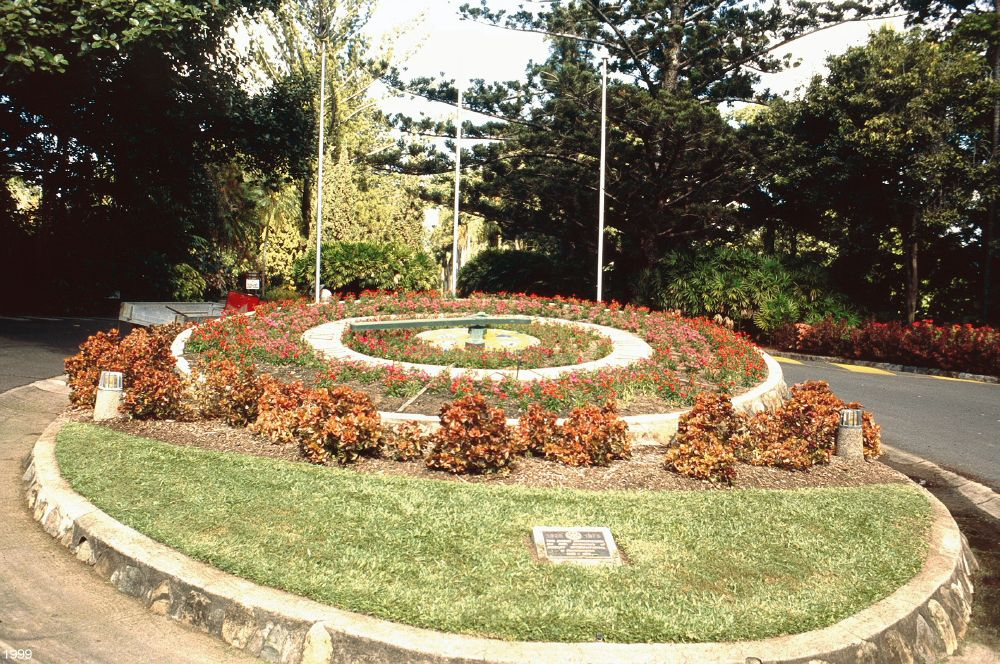
Floral clock, 1999

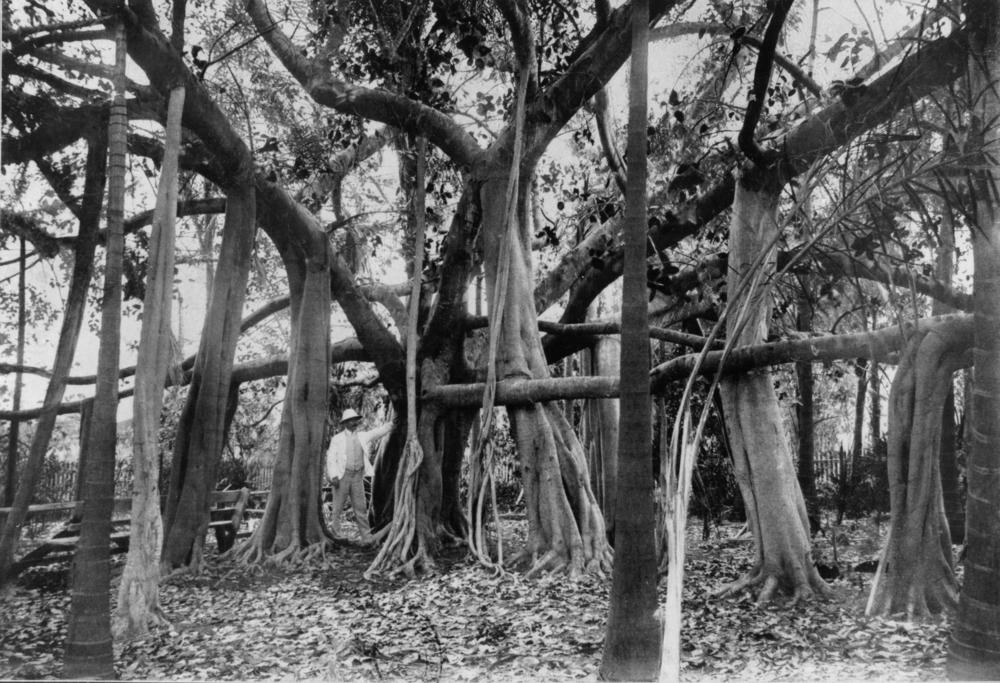
Banyan fig tree in the Rockhampton Botanic Gardens, 1910

Rockhampton Botanic Gardens are located on a 33-hectare site west of the Athelstane Range and bordered to the west by the Murray and Yeppen-Yeppen Lagoons. The northern boundary is the Rockhampton Golf Club and residential development lies to the east of the site. The adjacent partially developed Diggers Park establishes the southern boundary. The slope of the range creates a gently falling gradient from the entrance of the gardens to the banks of the Murray Lagoon. The Rockhampton Botanic Gardens comprise a series of gardens including: the lower gardens, the upper gardens, the outer gardens, the war memorial gardens and arid gardens.

The formal entrance to the botanic gardens is from Spencer Street through a set of masonry pillars with decorative iron gates. The informal entrance from Ann Street comprises an avenue of bunya pines (Araucaria bidwillii) interspersed with Bougainvillea. The Rockhampton Croquet Club, the Athelstane Bowls club, Athelstane Tennis Club, Rockhampton City Council Works Depot and the Rockhampton Golf Club are located along this avenue.

The community services building, a small open truss steel and glass structure on a concrete block base located in the main circular drive is surrounded by established decorative gardens. The Hugo Lassen Fernery is located behind this building. The Fernery is a timber slated structure, built into the shape of a cross with eye shaped openings cut into the slated walls. The Fernery houses a series of rock gardens with an established and mature exotic fern collection.

A floral clock, on a concrete base planted with flowering annuals and is the centrepiece of the circular drive. The clock face presents to the northern entrance to the gardens. A small plaque commemorating the donation of the clock from the Rotary Club of Rockhampton is located at its base.

The kiosk is located to the south of the community services building and ferneries and is approached by a series of concrete steps. Mature Banyan figs (Ficus benghalensis) form an impressive, shaded cove in which the kiosk is located. The kiosk building consists of three sections: the original 1912 octagonal core, the 1966 toilet block and the 1997 kitchen and servery. Tables and chairs occupy the understory of the Banyan Figs for the kiosk clientele.

The Rockhampton War Memorial, a 64-foot (20 m) Gracemere Grey Granite obelisk on a plinth, is located to the south of the kiosk in the upper gardens. The obelisk is located on a raised circular mound and encircled by Canary Island date palms.

The children's playground located in the understorey of a series of mature shade trees including, weeping Figs (Ficus benjamina) and other fig varieties. An open barbeque shelter is located adjacent to the playground.

Other significant gardens include the lower gardens with the mature mango orchard; the arid garden; the pinetum with mature stands of Kauri, Radiata and hoop pines; the outer gardens figs (Ficus hillii) with associated ginger underplantings and water course; the zoological gardens and picnic area associated with the Murray Lagoon.

== Heritage listing ==
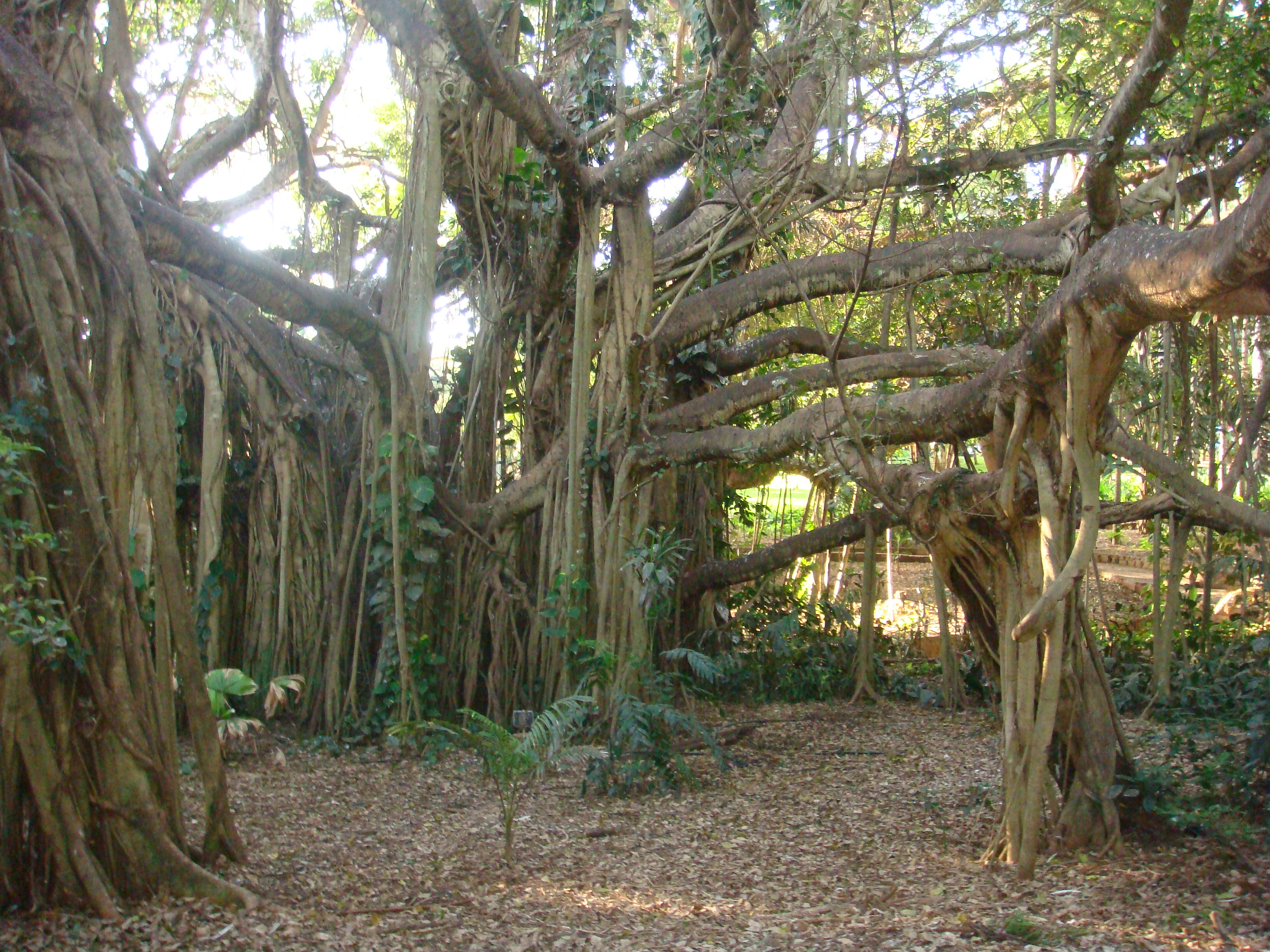
Banyan fig, 2009

Rockhampton Botanic Gardens was listed on the Queensland Heritage Register on 23 July 1999 having satisfied the following criteria.

The place is important in demonstrating the evolution or pattern of Queensland's history.

The Rockhampton Botanic Gardens, gazetted in 1869, are located on a 33-hectare site on the western slopes of the Athelstane range and bordered by the Murray and Yeppen-Yeppen Lagoons. The gardens are important as the premier recreation and botanic retreat for Rockhampton. They demonstrate the importance of Rockhampton as the major urban centre for the central Queensland region, demonstrating the desire to sustain a scientific, educational and recreational centre of international repute. As one of the first parks established by the Rockhampton City Council, the gardens demonstrate the commitment to provide recreational and educational facilities for the people of Rockhampton.

The place demonstrates rare, uncommon or endangered aspects of Queensland's cultural heritage.

The collection includes specimens rare in cultivation or of great maturity or both. The zoological park, once an integral part of many botanic gardens, is now an uncommon feature, making the Rockhampton Botanic Gardens important in demonstrating the historical development of botanic gardens in general.

The place is important in demonstrating the principal characteristics of a particular class of cultural places.

As a regional botanic gardens, the Rockhampton Botanic Gardens maintained a position within a national and international network of botanic gardens of which the Royal Botanic Gardens, Kew was the originating hub. It demonstrates the principal characteristics of a provincial botanic reserve, with a greater emphasis placed on the creating of an exotic collection of living botany rather than providing herbarium and library facilities. Exotic plantings dating from the nineteenth century include aesthetic, economic and experimental botany. Significant architectural features include the original curator's cottage and finch aviary (ca1880), the Kiosk (1912), the War Memorial (1924) and the Hugo Lassen Fernery (1938).

The place is important because of its aesthetic significance.

Many important events have taken place in the gardens, and the place is generally held in high regard by the community and is a popular place for visitors to Rockhampton. It is significant as a Rockhampton landmark and for its visual amenity.

The place has a special association with the life or work of a particular person, group or organisation of importance in Queensland's history.

The Rockhampton Botanic Gardens have a special association with the pioneering work of curators James Scott Edgar (1873–1903), Richard Simmons (1903–1930), Henry George Simmons (1930–1960), Ken C. Baker (1961–1972), Tom Wyatt (1972–1998). and Michael Elgey (2018–Present) (current Curator).
