= Rockhampton War Memorial =

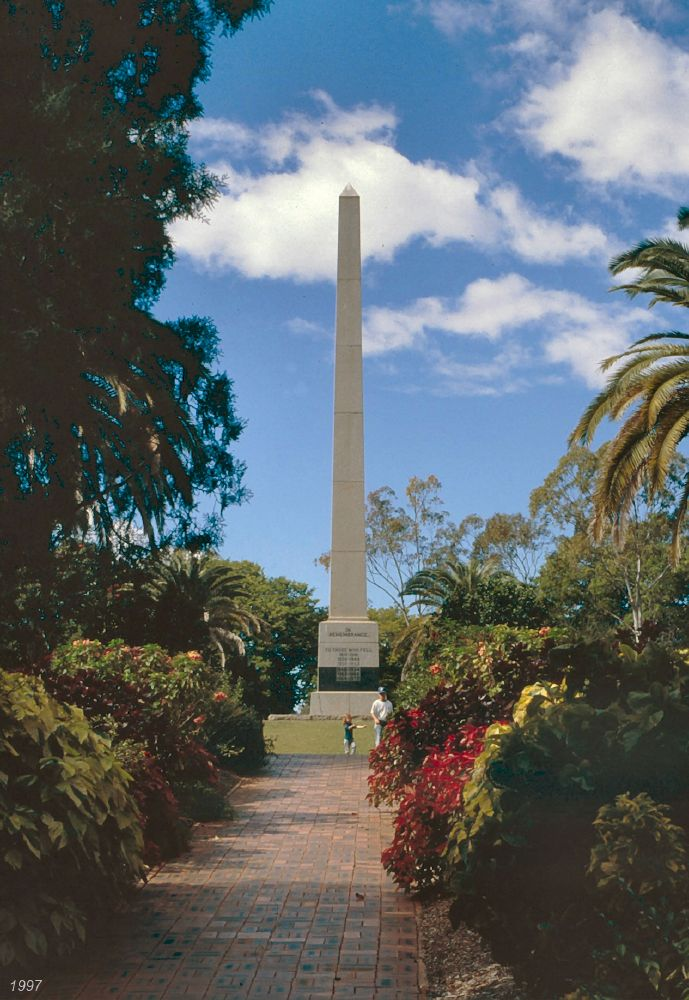
- Rockhampton War Memorial, 1997

- Location within Queensland Location within Australia
- 23.4007°S 150.4915°E
- Location: Penlington Street, The Range, Rockhampton, Rockhampton Region, Queensland, Australia

History
- Design period: 1919–1930s (interwar period)
- Built: 1924

Queensland Heritage Register
- Official name: Rockhampton War Memorial
- Type: state heritage (built)
- Designated: 21 October 1992
- Reference no.: 600818
- Significant period: 1924 (social); 1924 (historical, fabric)
- Significant components: war trophy/ies, memorial – obelisk, garden – bed/s, trees/plantings, mound/s, pathway/walkway

Rockhampton War Memorial is a heritage-listed memorial in the Rockhampton Botanic Gardens at Penlington Street, The Range, Rockhampton, Rockhampton Region, Queensland, Australia. It was built in 1924. It was added to the Queensland Heritage Register on 21 October 1992.

== History ==
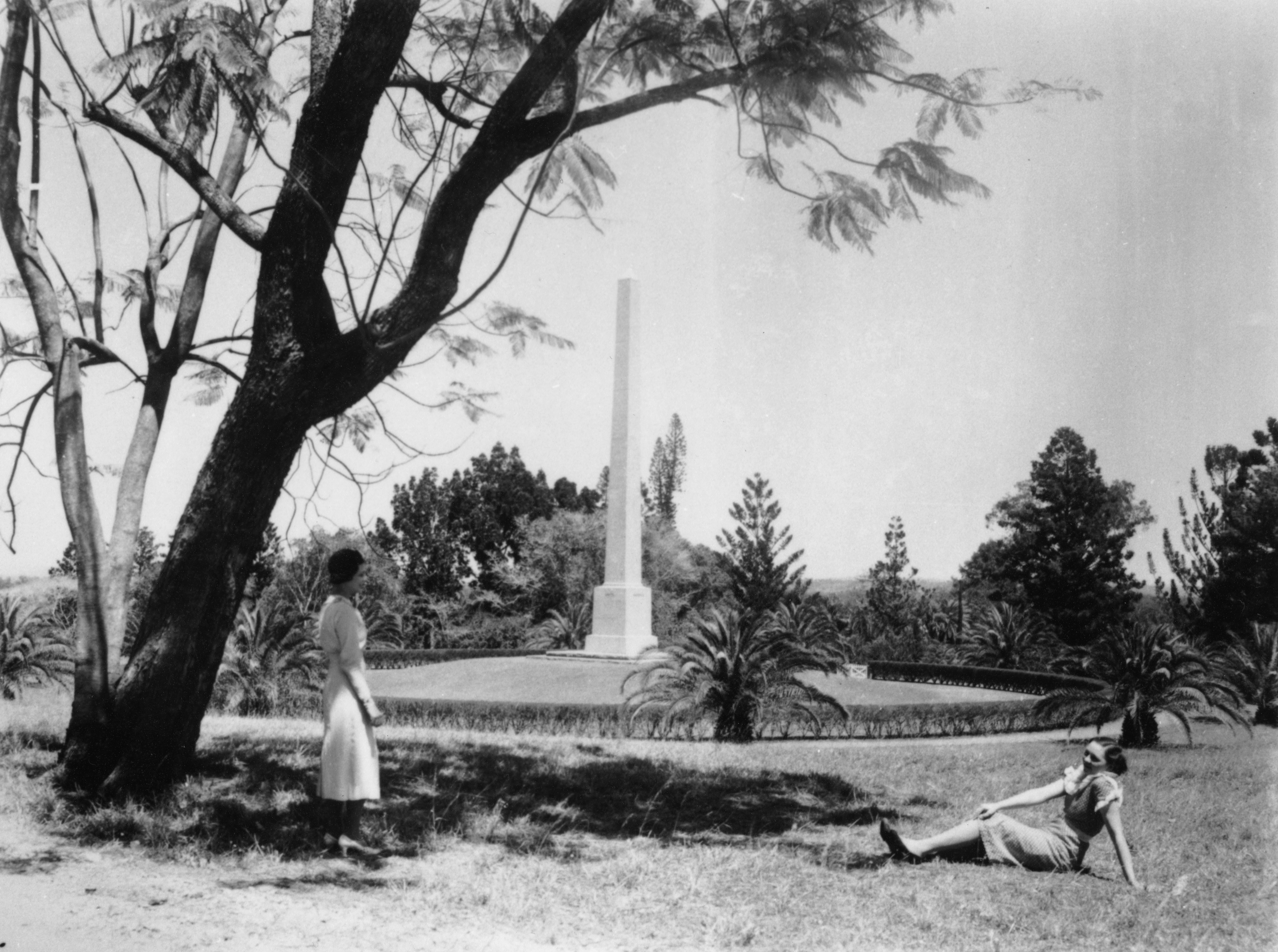
Rockhampton War Memorial located in the Botanic Gardens, circa 1936

The Rockhampton War Memorial was unveiled on 16 October 1924 by the Governor of Queensland Sir Matthew Nathan. It was designed by architects Hockings and Palmer and produced by monumental masons, F M Allen. The granite memorial honours those who served in the First World War.

A public meeting was held in February 1919, when it was decided to erect a memorial to those who served in the First World War. It was to be a regional monument, representing surrounding districts, but erected in Rockhampton. In 1921, a site was selected on the riverbank and a national design competition was announced by the newly formed Central Queensland War Memorial Committee. This however, was not successful as most designs were too costly.

In 1922, the committee commissioned Rockhampton architects, Hockings and Palmer to present a design for a memorial to be situated in the Rockhampton Botanic Gardens. Their design, at a cost of £2,654 was accepted and Rockhampton masons, F M Allen were contracted to complete the work.

The firm of Hockings and Palmer was a partnership between Edwin Morton Hockings and Leslie Tarween Palmer.

Edwin (Ted) Hockings was the son of Albert John Hockings, one of Brisbane's best known citizens the mayor in 1865 and 1867. Edwin Hockings was articled to Richard Gailey and, while working there, won a competition for the design of Rockhampton Girls Grammar School. He moved to Rockhampton to become clerk of works for the project and remained there, opening his own practice in 1895. He was wounded whilst commanding a squadron of the Third Queensland Contingent in the Boer War and also served in the First World War.

Less is known about Palmer except that he was educated in Melbourne and employed by E A Scott and Green, Architects in Sydney. He worked alone for two years in Rockhampton before entering into partnership with Hockings in 1916. The partnership continued until 1938.

The area in which Rockhampton is located was first discovered by Ludwig Leichhardt and Thomas Mitchell between 1844 and 1846. The Fitzroy river was later discovered by the Archer brothers in 1853 and lead to the establishment and success of the region as a pastoral district. The initial development of the city itself was due to the discovery of gold at nearby Canoona in 1858.

The Rockhampton Botanic Gardens were established in 1869 when Mayor R M Hunter requested that the government turn the Native Police paddock into a reserve for botanic gardens. This was approved and the land was gazetted. However a working gardener was not appointed until 1873. The impetus for the gardens came from Frenchman Monsieur Anthelme Thozet who was among the first to re-establish substantial plantings in Rockhampton by planting trees from his private nursery along the river bank in Quay Street. The first appointed gardener was J S Edgar, partially trained by Thozet. His successor was R Simmons, a naturalist whose skills were frequently called upon by local and overseas scientists. In his capacity as curator of the gardens, Simmons laid out the grounds surrounding the memorial.

Australia, and Queensland in particular, had few civic monuments before the First World War. The memorials erected in its wake became some of the country's first national monuments, recording the impact of the war on the nation. Australia lost 60,000 from a population of about 4 million, representing one in five of those who served.

Even before the end of the war, memorials became a spontaneous and highly visible expression of national grief. To those who erected them, they were as sacred as grave sites, substitute graves for the Australians whose bodies lay in battlefield cemeteries in Europe and the Middle East. British policy decreed that the Empire war dead were to be buried where they fell. The word "cenotaph", commonly applied to war memorials at the time, literally means "empty tomb".

Australian war memorials are distinctive in that they commemorate not only the dead. Australians were proud that their first great national army, unlike other belligerent armies, was composed entirely of volunteers, men worthy of honour whether or not they paid the supreme sacrifice. Many memorials honour all who served from a locality, not just the dead, providing valuable evidence of community involvement in the war. Such evidence is not readily obtainable from military records, or from state or national listings, where names are categorised alphabetically or by military unit.

Australian war memorials are also valuable evidence of imperial and national loyalties, at the time, not seen as conflicting; the skills of local stonemasons, metalworkers and architects; and of popular taste. In Queensland, the soldier statue was the popular choice of memorial, whereas the obelisk predominated in the southern states, possibly a reflection of Queensland's larger working-class population and a lesser involvement of architects.

Many of the First World War monuments have been updated to record local involvement in later conflicts, and some have fallen victim to unsympathetic re-location and repair.

Although there were many different types of memorial were erected throughout Queensland, few were of the scale or cost of the Rockhampton one. Funds however, did not cover the cost of recording the soldiers names on the monument and it was proposed at the unveiling that a list of names would be kept at the Rockhampton Town Hall. This is one of the few memorials in Queensland without lists of names.

== Description ==
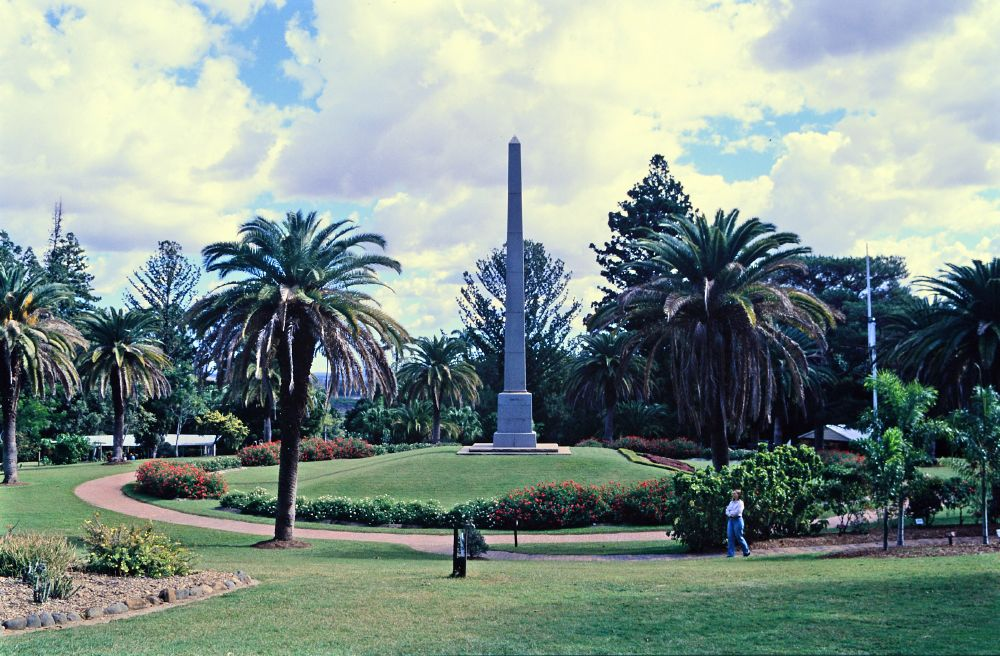
War memorial in the botanic gardens, 1977

The First World War Memorial is situated in the Botanic Gardens in Rockhampton.

It sits in the centre of a neat grass mound and is approached by a paved path from the south. The path surrounds grass mound, forming a circle which is reinforced by garden beds and evenly spaced Canary Island date palms (Phoenix canariensis), traditionally a symbol of victory. The grassed area is free of planting apart from a flower bed on the northern side in which herbaceous plants are pruned to form the word ANZAC surrounded by a border. A gun or war trophy is located in the centre of the approach path.

The memorial stands 64 feet (20 m) from the ground and is of Gracemere Grey granite. It comprises a plinth surmounted by a large obelisk.

The pedestal is located in the centre of a double stepped base which has rock faced vertical surfaces and smooth horizontal surfaces. The plinth is square in plan and is surmounted by the pedestal dado which is made up of three granite blocks. On the front face of the dado are the words IN REMEMBRANCE TO THOSE WHO FELL and the dates of the First World War and later conflicts. A polished granite plate has been bolted to the lower front face and also has dates of later conflicts. The northern side displays the word SACRIFICE on the top block.

The pedestal is surmounted by a tall obelisk which culminates in a pyramidal apex.

== Heritage listing ==
Rockhampton War Memorial was listed on the Queensland Heritage Register on 21 October 1992 having satisfied the following criteria.

The place is important in demonstrating the evolution or pattern of Queensland's history.

War Memorials are important in demonstrating the pattern of Queensland's history as they are representative of a recurrent theme that involved most communities throughout the state. They provide evidence of an era of widespread Australian patriotism and nationalism, particularly during and following the First World War.

The place demonstrates rare, uncommon or endangered aspects of Queensland's cultural heritage.

This memorial is of large scale. Situated in its immediate surroundings, it is the largest and most costly of all war memorials in Queensland. It is an example of a memorial situated in an original setting.

The place is important in demonstrating the principal characteristics of a particular class of cultural places.

The monuments manifest a documentary record and are demonstrative of popular taste in the inter-war period.

Erected in 1924, the memorial at Rockhampton demonstrates the principal characteristics of a commemorative structure erected as an enduring record of a major historical event. This is achieved through the appropriate use of various symbolic elements including the obelisk.

The place is important because of its aesthetic significance.

The memorial is of aesthetic significance for its high level of workmanship and design.

The place has a strong or special association with a particular community or cultural group for social, cultural or spiritual reasons.

It has a strong and continuing association with the community as evidence of the impact of a major historic event and as the focal point for the remembrance of that event. It also has special associations with the firms and individuals employed in the design, including architects Hockings and Palmer, monumental masonry firm F M Allan and Botanic Gardens curator R Simmons.
