= Fogel Field =

Baseball park in Hot Springs, Arkansas

- Interactive map of Fogel Field
- Former names: Fordyce Field; Holder Field
- Location: 847 Whittington Ave; Hot Springs, Arkansas; United States
- Coordinates: 34°30.905′N 93°4.393′W
- Owner: Arkansas Alligator Farm and Petting Zoo
- Surface: Grass

Construction
- Groundbreaking: 1911
- Opened: 1912
- Closed: 1952
- Main contractor: Hot Springs Park Company

Tenants
- Major League Spring Training; Philadelphia Phillies (NL) (1912); Pittsburgh Pirates (NL) (1921–1923, 1926); Negro League Spring Training; Kansas City Monarchs (1928); Homestead Grays (1930–1931); Pittsburgh Crawfords (1932–1935) ) Minor League Spring Training; Indianapolis Indians (American Association) (1926–1927); Milwaukee Brewers (American Association) (1927–1931); Montreal Royals (IL) (1932); St. Paul Saints (American Association) (1934–1935); Baseball Schools; Ray Doan Baseball School (1933–1938); George Barr Umpire School (1935–1952); Rogers Hornsby Baseball College (1939–1952).

Fogel Field was a baseball park located in Hot Springs, Arkansas, utilized for spring training games and baseball camps between 1912 and 1952. The site was also known as Fordyce Field and Holder Field. Fogel Field was built in 1912 as a spring training site for Major League Baseball teams. The field was named for Horace Fogel, President of the Philadelphia Phillies. Fogel Field hosted the Phillies (1912) and the Pittsburgh Pirates (1921–1923, 1926). The Kansas City Monarchs (1928), Homestead Grays (1930–1931) and Pittsburgh Crawfords (1932–1935) of Negro league baseball also used Fogel Field as their spring training site.

Several minor league baseball teams from the American Association used Fogel Field as well: Indianapolis Indians (1926–1927), Milwaukee Brewers (1927–1931) and St. Paul Saints (1934–1935). The Montreal Royals of the International League (1932) trained at Fogel Field.

== History ==
=== Early baseball and the Philadelphia Phillies ===
Beginning with spring 1886, when the Chicago White Stockings' (today's Chicago Cubs) President Albert Spalding, the founder of A.G Spalding, and player-manager Cap Anson brought their players to Hot Springs, Arkansas, the concept was for players to have training and improved fitness before the start of the regular season. This move gave credit to Hot Springs being called the "birthplace of spring training baseball".

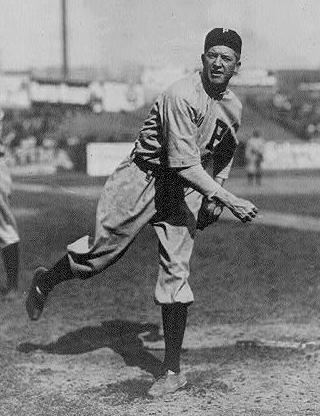
Grover Cleveland Alexander

After the White Stockings had a successful season in 1886, winning the National League Pennant, other teams began bringing their players to Hot Springs. The St. Louis Browns, New York Yankees, St. Louis Cardinals, Cleveland Spiders, Detroit Tigers, Pittsburgh Pirates, Cincinnati Reds, New York Highlanders, Brooklyn Dodgers and Boston Red Sox were among the early squads to arrive in Hot Springs. Needing venues to play, Whittington Park, Majestic Park and Fogel Field (1912) were all built in Hot Springs specifically to host Major League teams. Later, Sam Guinn Field was built in 1933 at 497 Crescent Avenue to host Negro league spring training teams.

After the Hot Spring Baseball Grounds were used for other purposes, that left Whittington Park and Majestic Park as the only two fields in Hot Springs. Fogel Field was then built by the Hot Springs Park Company in 1911 to meet the demand. Philadelphia Phillies' president and owner Horace Fogel secured the field for his franchise and the field was named after him. The field was dedicated by Hot Springs mayor Wilson in November 1911 by breaking a bottle of wine against its entrance. The Phillies used the field for spring training ahead of the 1912 season.

Located directly across the street from Whittington Park, Fogel Field had a small grandstand. Besides the Phillies and Pirates, the park was used by teams using Whittington Park, due to its convenient proximity. Hall of famers such as Babe Ruth, Cy Young, Honus Wagner, Grover Cleveland Alexander and Pie Traynor were among the roster of players to play at the site. Fogel was banned from baseball after the 1912 season for saying that umpires favored the New York Giants and were treating the Phillies unfairly. Thereafter, the park was called Fordyce Field for a time, renamed after the nearby Fordyce Bathhouse, just as Majestic Park had a namesake in the Majestic Hotel.

=== Babe Ruth home run ===
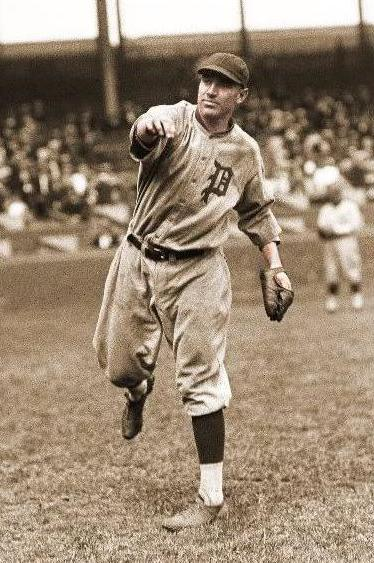
Hall of Famer, Pie Traynor, Pittsburgh Pirates, 1922

On St. Patrick's Day, 1918, Babe Ruth played the field for the first time in a spring training game. Playing at Whittington Park with the Boston Red Sox, Ruth hit a home run that traveled an estimated 573 feet. The home run sailed over Whittington Avenue, landing in the Arkansas Alligator Farm, which still exists, mostly unchanged. Fogel Field sits just adjacent to the Alligator Farm. At the time, Ruth had exclusively been a successful left-handed pitcher, but in part due to his home run that day, he soon switched to hitting. Today, the Alligator Farm has a marker recognizing the Ruth home run, near the marker for Fogel Field.

=== Pittsburgh Pirates ===
After the Phillies, with Hall of Fame pitcher Grover Cleveland Alexander, in 1912, the Pirates followed at Fogel Field in 1921, having utilized Whittington Park for many years. The Pirates (1921–23, 1926) trained with rosters that included Baseball Hall of Famers Rabbit Maranville, Kiki Cuyler, Charlie Grimm, Joe Cronin, Paul Waner, Pie Traynor and Max Carey.

Major League teams eventually migrated to the warmer climates of Florida and Arizona for spring training. Fogel Field became then the spring training site for Negro league and Minor League teams. The Negro league Kansas City Monarchs (1928), Homestead Grays (1930–31) and Pittsburgh Crawfords (1932–35) utilized the site. Later, Indianapolis, Milwaukee, St. Paul and Montreal were Minor League franchises that utilized Fogel Field for spring training. From 1938 to 1941 the Hot Springs Bathers used the field for batting practice and other practices, as their Whittington Park home field was just across the street.

== Negro leagues spring training ==
=== Pittsburgh Crawfords ===
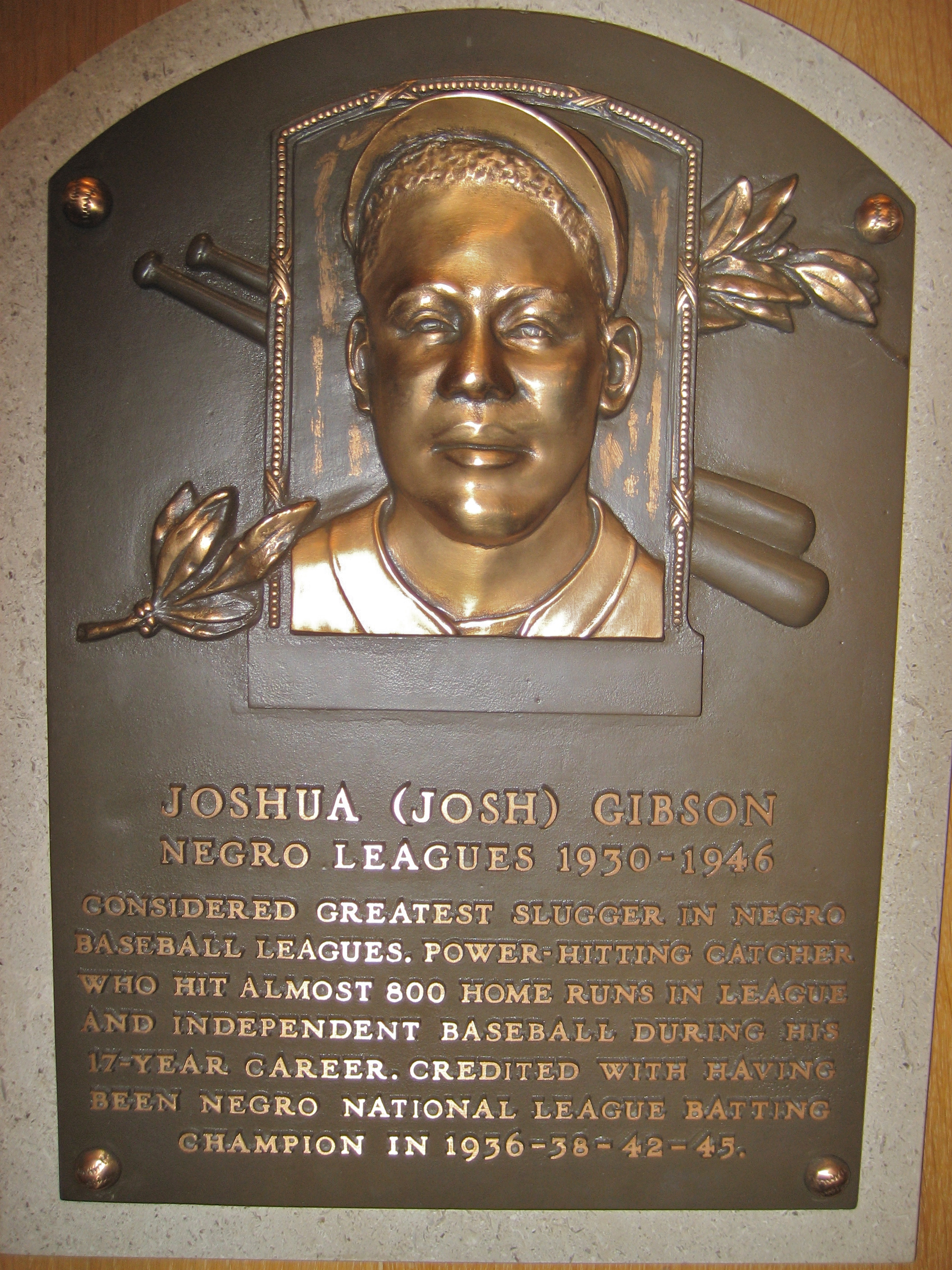
Josh Gibson HOF Plaque

The Pittsburgh Crawfords of the Negro leagues utilized Fogel Field for spring training from 1932 to 1935. The 1935 Crawfords team has been called one of the greatest teams ever assembled, eventually winning the 1935 Negro National League Pennant. With a roster full of stars and future Hall-of Fame players, the 1935 Crawfords were nicknamed "the best team money could buy," as many of their players came from other clubs. Their 1935 roster contained Baseball Hall of Fame Inductees Cool Papa Bell, Josh Gibson, Oscar Charleston and Judy Johnson.

=== Homestead Grays ===
The Negro league Homestead Grays, which represented the borough of Homestead, Pennsylvania, located 7 miles from Pittsburgh, held spring training at the Field in 1930 and 1931. On their roster were numerous Hall of Fame players: Cool Papa Bell, Josh Gibson, Oscar Charleston, Jud Wilson, Bill Foster, Judy Johnson, Smokey Joe Williams and Willie Wells. Franchise owner Cum Posey was also inducted into the Hall of Fame.

=== Kansas City Monarchs ===
The 1928 Kansas City Monarchs who used Fogel Field had Baseball Hall of Fame Inductees Andy Cooper and Bullet Rogan.

== Minor League teams ==
Among other minor league teams, the 1935 St. Paul Saints trained at the site. A pitcher for the squad was Monty Stratton. Stratton was portrayed by Jimmy Stewart in The Stratton Story. An All-Star pitcher for the Chicago White Sox, Stratton lost his leg in an accident during the height of his career and pitched afterwards with a prosthetic leg.

== Baseball schools ==
From 1933 to 1938, the annual Ray Doan Baseball School was held in Hot Springs, with Fogel Field utilized as one site for the hundreds of campers. Doan's school drew hundreds of younger players annually, with 1938 drawing 450 players. Doan had many noteworthy players on his instructional staff, including Rogers Hornsby, Grover Cleveland Alexander, Red Faber, Dizzy Dean, George Sisler, Bob Feller, Tris Speaker and Burleigh Grimes. Legendary female athlete Babe Didrickson, attended in 1933. At the time Didrickson was the reigning Olympic Gold Medalist hurdler in the 1932 Summer Olympic Games and she went on to major success in professional golf.

In 1939, Rogers Hornsby took over for Doan in Hot Springs and created the Rogers Hornsby Baseball College which operated until the 1950s, continuing to utilize Fogel Field.

The first recognized Umpire School was held in conjunction with both baseball schools, starting in 1935. Drawing aspiring umpires, the George Barr Umpire School was the first of its kind and was operated by Major League umpire George Barr. Future Major League Umpires Bill McKinley and Scotty Robb were attendees, as was war hero Harry Ladner.

== Media/history ==
The National Baseball Hall of Fame library has a series of photos of the baseball schools and Cassidy Lent, Reference Librarian at the Hall of Fame, wrote the feature School Days in Arkansas, highlighting the baseball schools with mention of their use of Fogel Field.

Memorabilia from the Umpire School, baseball schools and George Barr's umpiring career are on display at the Oklahoma Sports Hall of Fame. The items were donated by George Barr.

The George Barr Umpire School and the Hornsby Baseball School were featured in the March 10, 1947 issue of Life.

Fogel Field is featured in The First Boys of Spring, a 2015 documentary on Hot Springs Spring Training produced by Larry Foley. The film is narrated by Hot Springs area native, actor Billy Bob Thornton. The documentary began airing nationally on the MLB Network in February, 2016.

== The site today ==
The grass field still exists at the site and is used by the Arkansas Alligator Farm for overflow parking.

There are two plaques at the site. The plaques are part of the Hot Springs Baseball Historic Trail and recognize Fogel Field and Babe Ruth. The ballpark plaque reads:

This field, also known as Fordyce Field, was constructed in 1912 by the Hot Springs Park Company to meet the demand of over 250 major leaguers training in Hot Springs. The Philadelphia Phillies’ owner Horace Fogel, leased the field for his team. The Phillies’ roster included pitching legend Grover Cleveland Alexander and slugging outfielders Gavvy Cravath and Sherwood Magee. The training ground was also later used by the Pittsburgh Pirates.

The plaque for Babe Ruth says the following:

Ruth trained here nine times and became a very familiar face around Hot Springs. He hiked the mountains, took the baths, played golf, patronized the casinos, and visited the racetrack. On March 17, 1918 (St. Patrick’s Day), he launched a mammoth home run from Whittington Park that landed on the fly, inside the Arkansas Alligator Farm. It has been measured at 573 feet, — baseball’s first 500-foot-plus drive.
