= Jaycee Park =

Jaycee Park may refer to

- Jaycee Park (Hot Springs, Arkansas), a ballpark also known as Bathers Field
  - Majestic Park, previous name of Jaycee Park
- Jaycee Park (Fort Pierce, Florida), former home of Pittsburgh Pirates spring training
- Jaycee Park (Plainview, Texas), a ballpark
- Jaycees Field, Nacogdoches, Texas baseball venue
