= Hot Springs Arlingtons =

Information
- League: Southern Negro League (1897)
- Location: Hot Springs, Arkansas
- Ballpark: Whittington Park (1896–1904)
- Established: 1896
- Disbanded: 1904
- Nickname(s): Hot Springs Arlingtons (1896–1903); Hot Springs Blues (1904)
- League titles: 1 1900

The Hot Springs Arlingtons were a professional Negro leagues baseball team based in Hot Springs, Arkansas from 1896 to 1904. The Hot Springs Arlingtons played as members of the Southern Negro League and hosted home games at Whittington Park. The team was known as the Hot Springs Blues in 1904.

Baseball Hall of Fame member Rube Foster played for the 1901 Hot Springs Arlingtons.

== History ==
The Hot Springs Arlingtons began play in 1896 as a professional Negro team. The Arlingtons played at Whittington Park and drew white and black fans to their games. Their main competition was the Little Rock Quapaws.

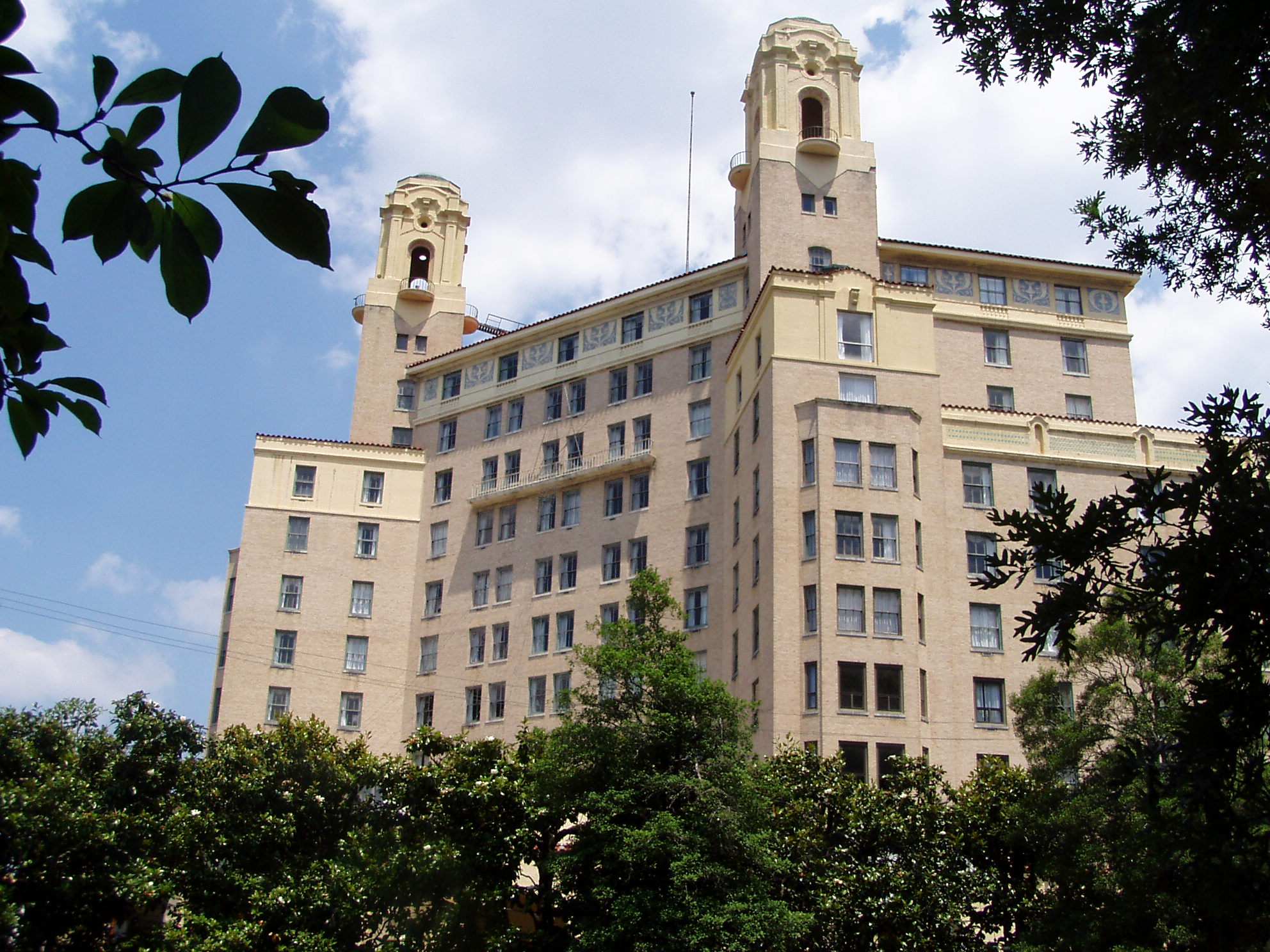
(2005) Arlington Hotel, Hot Springs, Arkansas. The hotel was the namesake of the ballclub.

The Hot Springs Arlingtons were so named due to being sponsored by Alfred Holden, who was the headwaiter of the Arlington Hotel in Hot Springs.

In 1897, the Hot Springs Arlingtons began play in a formation of a southern Negro league, which featured Hot Springs, the Little Rock Quapaws, Memphis Cliffords, Pensacola Acmes, Birmingham Unions and a Montgomery, Alabama team as league members. The Little Rock Quapaws were reported to have traveled to games in Hot Springs in a wagon. The 1897 Hot Springs Arlingtons played integrated exhibition games against the Little Rock Senators and the Hot Springs Bathers teams, both members of the Arkansas State League.

The Arlingtons continued play through 1903. The last documented games played by the Arlingtons were in May, 1903. In June, 1903 a streetcar boycott occurred when legislation requiring black Arkansans to sit in the back of public streetcars was implemented. As Whittington Park was located at the end of Hot Springs' streetcar line and Whittington Park was owned and operated by the Hot Springs streetcar company, the Arlingtons ceased play.

In 1904, the team became known as the Hot Springs Blues. The Blues played ten documented games in 1904.

== The ballpark ==
The Hot Springs Arlingtons were noted to have played home games at Whittington Park. Whittington Park hosted numerous major league baseball teams for spring training, including the Pittsburgh Pirates, Cleveland Spiders, Brooklyn Superbas, Detroit Tigers, New York Highlanders and Chicago Colts. Today, as part of the "Hot Springs Baseball Trail" there are historical markers at the site of Whittington Park, as well as the Arlington Hotel.The Whittington Park home plate location is marked, with the current location being in the parking lot of the Weyerhaeuser offices. The address is 810 Whittington Avenue, Hot Springs National Park, Arkansas.

The namesake Arlington Hotel is still in use today and is located at 239 Central Avenue, Hot Springs, Arkansas.

== Notable alumni ==
Source: Arkansas Baseball History

- Rube Foster (1901) Inducted Baseball Hall of Fame, 1981
- Eugene Milliner (1900-1901)
- Dave Wyatt (1897)

== See also ==
- Hot Springs Arlingtons players
- List of minor Negro league baseball teams
