= George Barr (umpire) =

American baseball umpire (1892-1974)

- Born: July 19, 1892; Scammon, Kansas, U.S.
- Died: July 26, 1974 (aged 82); Sulphur, Oklahoma, U.S.
- Occupation: Umpire
- Years active: 1931–1949
- Employer: National League
- Known for: Founded and Operated the first Umpire School (1935–1967); Wrote first book on Umpiring (1952)
- Title: Major League Umpire
- Spouse(s): Mary Elizabeth de Vaughn (d. 1958); Ardis Nott (m.1961)
- Parent(s): Alexander Bundy Barr; Mary Jane (Reed) Barr

George McKinley Barr (July 19, 1892 – July 26, 1974) was an American professional baseball umpire who was a pioneer in umpiring instruction. Barr worked in the National League from 1931 to 1949. Barr umpired 2,757 major league games in his 19-year career. He umpired in four World Series (1937, 1942, 1948, 1949) and two All-Star Games (1937 and 1944). Barr was the founder of the George Barr Umpire School, the earliest umpire training school and author of the first book on umpiring. Barr was a pioneer in using the inside chest protector.

== Early life ==
Barr was born in Scammon, Kansas, on July 19, 1892. When he arrived in Tulsa as a young man in 1915, he is said to have had only ten cents to his name. While working as a stadium usher in 1923, Barr got his first opportunity to umpire when one of the arbiters was a no-show for a game. He was hired to the Western Association for the following year.

== Umpire career ==
After two seasons in the Western Association (1924–25), Barr moved to the Texas League in 1926 and stayed for several seasons. In August 1931, Barr was promoted to the Major Leagues. In 1933, he was Ernie Quigley's partner when Quigley sustained an electric shock while dressing after the game and was left unconscious; Quigley recovered without incident. Barr Umpired in the 1937 and 1944 All-Star Games and the 1937, 1942, 1948 and 1949 World Series. The 1937 All-Star Game was one in which pitcher Dizzy Dean sustained a toe injury that negatively affected the rest of his career.

The following year, on June 15, 1938, Barr worked as the First Base Umpire for an unprecedented event in baseball history, as the Reds' Johnny Vander Meer threw a second consecutive no-hitter at Ebbets Field. Vander Meer is the only pitcher in major league history to throw back-to-back no-hitters. It was also the first major league no-hitter pitched in a night-game. Barr worked Home Plate in Babe Ruth's last game in 1935.

Barr was the home plate umpire on September 28, 1938, when the Cubs' Gabby Hartnett hit the famous "Homer in the Gloamin" at Wrigley Field. With darkness descending, Barr had earlier ruled that the Cubs and Pirates would play one more inning, leading to Hartnett's game-winning home run with two on and two outs in the bottom on the 9th inning to win the game 6–5 and put the Cubs in 1st place. Being mobbed by players and fans in circling the bases, Hartntett recalled Barr making sure he touched home plate.

On May 27, 1942, Barr called a balk on Brooklyn Dodgers pitcher Johnny Allen, who then rushed Barr, knocking him to his knees. Allen was suspended 30 days and fined for his physical confrontation of Barr. On September 11, 1946, Barr umpired a 19-inning scoreless tie between Brooklyn and Cincinnati that remains the longest scoreless game in history. On September 18, 1946, at the Polo Grounds Barr collapsed from a heart attack during a New York-Chicago game, but he recovered to resume umpiring again.

On September 28, 1948, Barr was the Home Plate Umpire as Jackie Robinson stole home in a 9–8 Dodgers victory over the Boston Braves. The next day, Barr famously ejected Braves player Connie Ryan in the second game of a double header for appearing in the on deck circle wearing a raincoat on a rainy day. After umpiring in the 1948 World Series, Barr was briefly confined at home under a physician's care for an undisclosed illness.

Barr was the first-base umpire in a three-man crew during the second game of an August 21, 1949, doubleheader between the Phillies and Giants at Philadelphia's Shibe Park. In the top of the ninth inning, Barr ruled that Phillies' center fielder Richie Ashburn had trapped rather than caught a fly ball hit by New York's Joe Lafata. Thus, an apparent out was turned into an RBI double for the visitors. Fans reacted by repeatedly throwing fruit and bottles at the umpires causing them to abandon the field for their safety. The game was ruled a forfeit win for New York. Bottles were soon banned from being sold at Shibe Park and soon the rest of baseball followed.

Barr retired from MLB umpiring in January, 1950. He later served as president of the Western Association, Sooner State League and the Kansas–Oklahoma–Missouri League, lower-level minor leagues that would both fold in that decade.

He was active with Babe Ruth League Baseball, serving as an international director for 14 years and helping to start the league in Europe.

1962, Barr was appointed to run the Oklahoma American Legion junior baseball program.

=== George Barr Umpire School ===
In 1935, Barr founded the first umpire training school. At first located in Hot Springs, Arkansas, Barr's Umpire School operated in conjunction with the Roy Doan Baseball School (1935–38) and the Rogers Hornsby Baseball College (1939-1952), which drew hundreds of youth students. The Umpire School was held at Whittington Park, along with other venues in Hot Springs: Fogel Field and Majestic Park. Later, Barr would move the school would move to Florida, where he operated it until 1967. Future major league umpires Bill McKinley, Scotty Robb, Bob Engel, Ken Burkhart and Dick Stello were students at Barr's school. Barr prided himself on his school's tough standards. "We will tolerate no drinking, gambling or whistling at girls," Barr said in 1949. He instituted a system of 10 cent fines, paid to the hotel's waitresses, for student mistakes or silly questions. After his MLB retirement, Barr continued to operate the school well into the 1960s, after moving the school to Florida.

Barr also took his instruction out of the United States, holding Umpiring clinics in Canada, Germany, Puerto Rico, Korea and Japan.

== History/Media ==
Barr donated memorabilia from the Umpire School and his umpiring career. The items are on display at the Oklahoma Sports Hall of Fame in Guthrie, Oklahoma. Included is a "rare display" of autographed baseballs.

The George Barr Umpire School was featured in the March 10, 1947, issue of Life Magazine. Included was a photo of Barr in long underwear.

The New York Historical Society Museum and Library said the following of Barr: "Few men have contributed as much conceptually to major league umpiring as George McKinley Barr, who umpired in the N.L. for 19 seasons (1931-49). In 1935, Barr opened the first umpiring school in Hot Springs, Ark., then wrote the first textbook about umpiring, and later served as president of two minor leagues, where he emphasized umpire training. He operated his umpire school until 1967 while serving as president of the Western Association (1953-1954) and the Sooner State League (1956-1957). Called up in August 1931, Barr umpired four World Series and is the last umpire to get Series assignments in consecutive years (1948-49). He worked the Subway Series of 1937 and the 1942 Fall Classic."

== Author ==
Barr Authored the book Baseball Umpiring in 1952. It was the first book to comprehensively address Umpiring.

Barr previously had written a section on Umpiring in The Sporting News 1951 soft cover book: How to Play Baseball. The Book had the following authors on topics: "Pitching by Larry Jansen; Catching by Ray Schalk; Batting by Rogers Hornsby; Base Running by Bernie DeViveiros; First Base by George Sisler; Second Base by Rogers Hornsby; Shortstop by Honus Wagner; Third Base by George Kell; Outfield by Joe DiMaggio; and How to Umpire by George Barr."

Barr first addressed Umpiring in print when he wrote "You can't Kill the Umpire" for Baseball Digest, in the May 6, 1947, edition.

== Personal life ==
In 1925, Barr married Mary Elizabeth de Vaughn. She died in 1958. In 1961 Barr married Ardis Nott. The couple had no children. Barr donated his baseball memorabilia to the Seminole Community College Library. The items have since been placed in the Oklahoma Sports Hall of Fame.

=== Death ===
Barr died on July 26, 1974, in Sulphur, Oklahoma, of heart disease. Barr had reportedly been in poor health for the previous two years.

== Awards and honors ==
Barr was inducted into the Oklahoma Sports Hall of Fame in 1963.

In 1969, George McKinley Barr was inducted into the Babe Ruth League Baseball Hall of Fame.

== See also ==
- List of Major League Baseball umpires (disambiguation)
