= Ban Johnson Park =

Baseball stadium

- Whittington Park, McKee Park
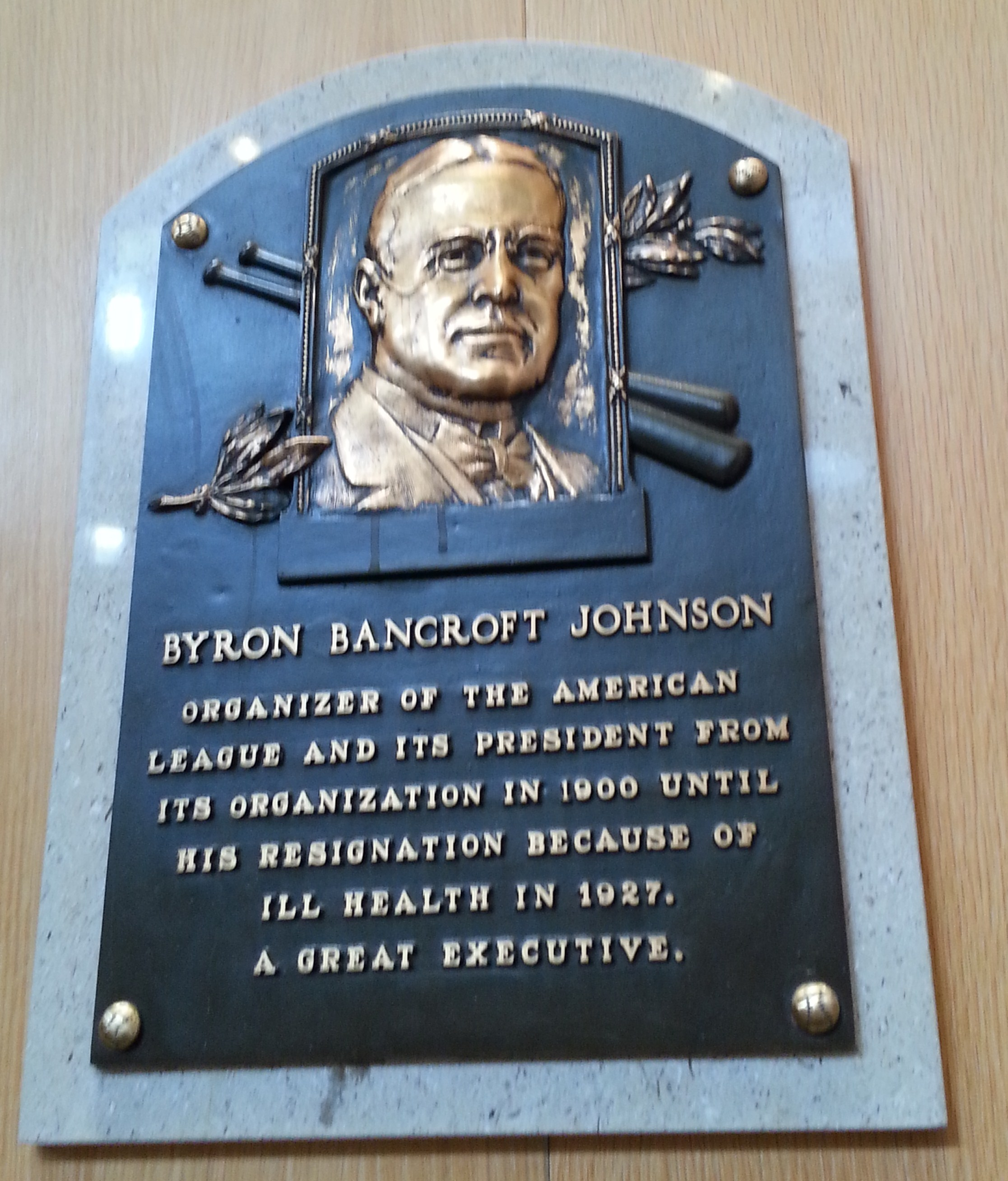
- Ban Johnson HOF plaque
- Interactive map of Ban Johnson Park
- Former names: Whittington Park (1894–1920, 1924-1935); McKee Park (1921-23)
- Location: 870 Whittington Ave; Hot Springs, Arkansas; United States
- Coordinates: 34.51510°N 93.07403°W
- Owner: Weyerhauser Company (current)
- Capacity: 1,400 (1913); 2,000 (1939)
- Surface: Grass
- Field size: 260 RF; 400 CF; 340 LF

Construction
- Groundbreaking: 1894
- Opened: 1894
- Renovated: 1910, 1930, 1936, 1938
- Expanded: 1910, 1930, 1938
- Closed: 1947
- Demolished: c. 1947

Tenants
- Spring training Cleveland Spiders (1896,1898–1899); Chicago Cubs (1896); St. Louis Cardinals (NL) (1900); Pittsburgh Pirates (NL) (1896, 1901–1916, 1926); Detroit Tigers (1908); New York Yankees (1908); Brooklyn Dodgers (1910-12, 1917–1918); Boston Red Sox (1920–1923); Minor League Baseball; Hot Springs Vapors (1906); Hot Springs Vaporites (1908-09); Hot Springs Bathers (1894, 1897-98, 1938-41); Negro leagues Hot Springs Arlingtons (1896-1903); Hot Spring Blues (1904); Baseball Schools; Ray Doan Baseball School (1933–1938); George Barr Umpire School (1935–1947); Rogers Hornsby Baseball College (1939-1947)

Ban Johnson Park was a baseball stadium located in Hot Springs, Arkansas. It was also known as Whittington Park and McKee Park. The ballpark was located within today's Whittington Park Historic District and directly across from the still active Arkansas Alligator Farm and Petting Zoo.

Originally known as Whittington Park, the ballpark was the Spring training site for numerous Major League Baseball teams, hosting spring training games and served as home for Hot Springs minor league teams. Over 130 Major League Baseball Hall of Fame inductees played at Whittington Park. In 1918, Babe Ruth, then a pitcher for the Boston Red Sox, hit a 573-foot home run at the park. The park was also home to the ever first Umpire School. In 1935, Whittington Park, was renamed after Hall of Fame baseball pioneer Ban Johnson, founder of the American League.

== History ==
=== Early baseball in Hot Springs ===
Beginning with the spring of 1886, when the Chicago White Stockings' (today's Chicago Cubs) President Albert Spalding, the founder of A.G Spalding, and player/manager Cap Anson brought their players to Hot Springs, Arkansas. The concept was for the players to have training and fitness before the start of the regular season. This move gave credit to Hot Springs being called the "birthplace of spring training baseball". Both Spalding and Anson, liked the city and the natural springs for their players. They first played in an area behind what is now the Garland County Courthouse on Ouachita Avenue and was called the Hot Springs Baseball Grounds. Many other teams followed and began training in Hot Springs Springs

In 1894 Whittington Park opened as a replacement for the Hot Springs Baseball Grounds. Along with Majestic Park, built in 1909, and nearby Fogel Field, built in 1912, Hot Springs developed training venues to meet the demand for Major League teams. Later, another venue, Sam Guinn Field was built in 1933 at 497 Crescent Avenue to host Negro leagues spring training.

The original playing field was estimated to be between 500–600 feet (150–180 m) to center field. In 1910, the original grandstand was demolished and home plate moved, giving the field shorter dimensions. In 1938, the right field fence was heightened by 15 feet (4.6 m) because right field distance was only 260 feet (79 m).

Over 130 Major League Baseball Hall of Fame players, including Babe Ruth, Cy Young, Cap Anson, Honus Wagner, Ty Cobb, Tris Speaker, Walter Johnson, Rogers Hornsby, Mel Ott, Jimmie Foxx, Stan Musial and Satchel Paige were involved in training or spring training games at Whittington Park. The park was also utilized by the House of David teams, and for baseball schools. The bearded House of David traveling baseball team used Whittington Field and Hot Springs for their training site. Major League teams training at Whittington Park between 1896 and 1926 were the Cleveland Spiders, Chicago Cubs, St. Louis Cardinals, Pittsburgh Pirates, Detroit Tigers, New York Yankees, Brooklyn Dodgers and Boston Red Sox.

Whittington Park was home to the Negro league Hot Springs Arlingtons from 1896 to 1903 and the Hot Springs Blues in 1904.

=== Babe Ruth's historic Alligator Farm home run ===
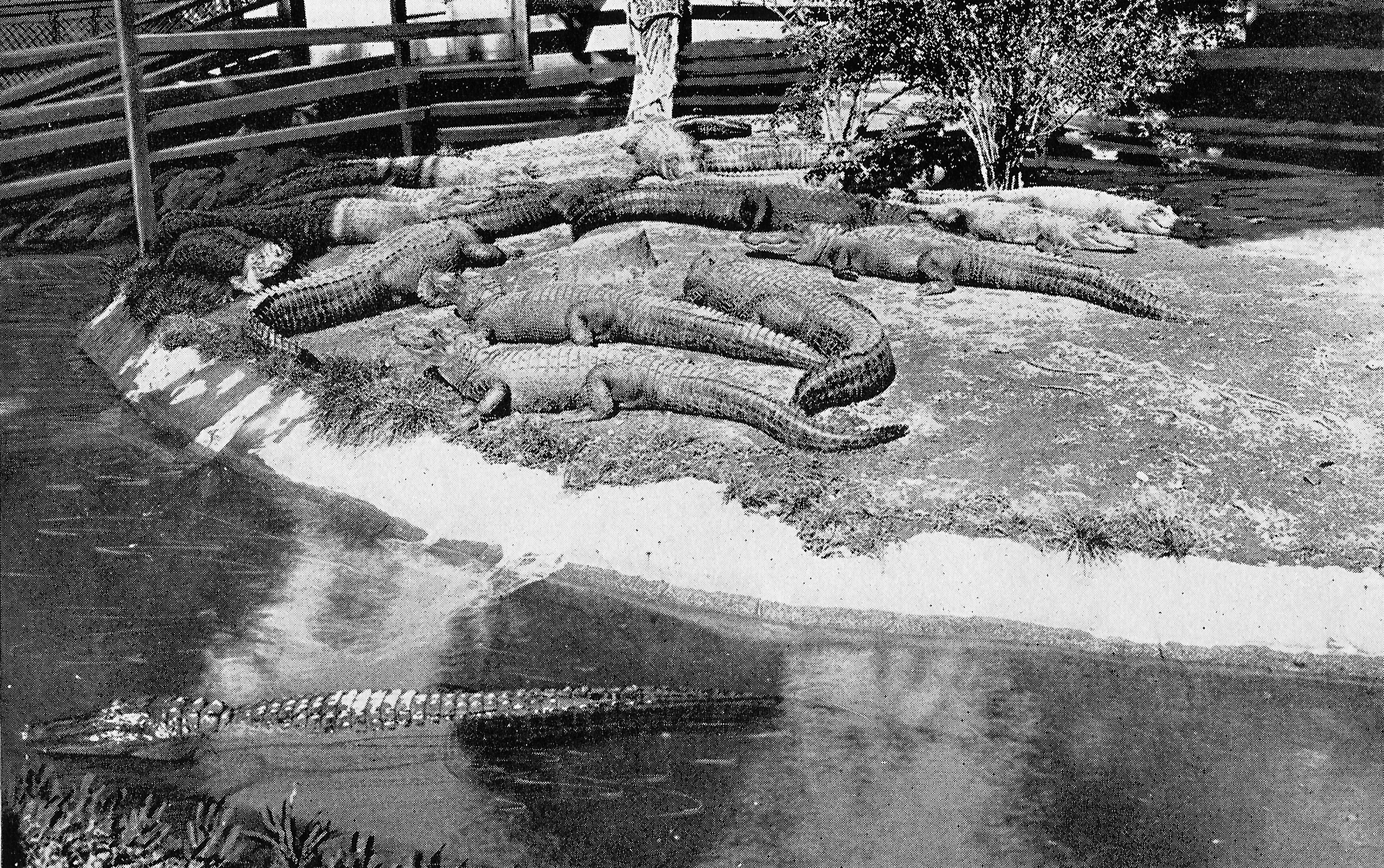
Hot Springs Alligator Farm, 1924

St. Patrick's Day, 1918, is nicknamed the "Day that changed Baseball Forever". On that day, Babe Ruth hit a long Home Run into the Arkansas Alligator Farm and Petting Zoo. The story goes that on March 17, 1918, Babe Ruth, then an accomplished 23-year-old Boston Red Sox left-handed pitcher, altered the course of baseball history. Red Sox first baseman Dick Hoblitzel was unable to play in the opening exhibition game against Brooklyn at Whittington Park. Ruth (coming off a 24–13 season) was a last minute replacement at first base, his first time at a position other than pitcher.

Ruth would hit two long home runs that day while playing the field for the first time. His first home run was a long blast that landed in a wood pile. However, his second Home run is legendary in its record setting length and eventual effect on Ruth. It was a grand slam, a shot that traveled an astonishing estimated 573 feet (175 m), sailing out of the park, across the entire span of Whittington Avenue, landing in a pond the alligator farm across the street. Even the Dodgers stood and cheered. Amazingly, Ruth would prove it was no fluke as he hit another home run into the alligator farm a week later, while pitching for the Red Sox.

On March 15, 2011, an event was held to recognize and celebrate the famous Ruth home run at the site. Bill Jenkinson, a noted baseball historian was part of the event, visited the site and helped to authenticate the 573-foot (175 m) home run. About the home run distance, Jenkins said, "No one can confirm it with complete certainty, but the data points in that direction. As an historian I must remain objective, and I am simply stating that, either way, what Ruth did that day was literally amazing."

Ruth's performance that day at Whittington Park led to a change in Ruth's career and a major change in baseball history. As a result of his hitting, the Red Sox began rethinking Ruth's dual abilities during and after 1918. To begin, Ruth would alternate in the 1918 season, pitching less and playing the field often. His dual abilities helped lead the Red Sox to the 1918 World Series Championship. Hitting more regularly in 1918, Ruth hit a league leading 11 home runs to go with a 13–7 record (and two wins in the Series). Eventually Ruth stopped pitching and became a hitter, with results of legend that exploded after his 1920 sale to the New York Yankees: Lifetime, .342 average; 714 Home Runs; 2062 RBI'S; 2174 Runs Scored; 1.164 OPS.

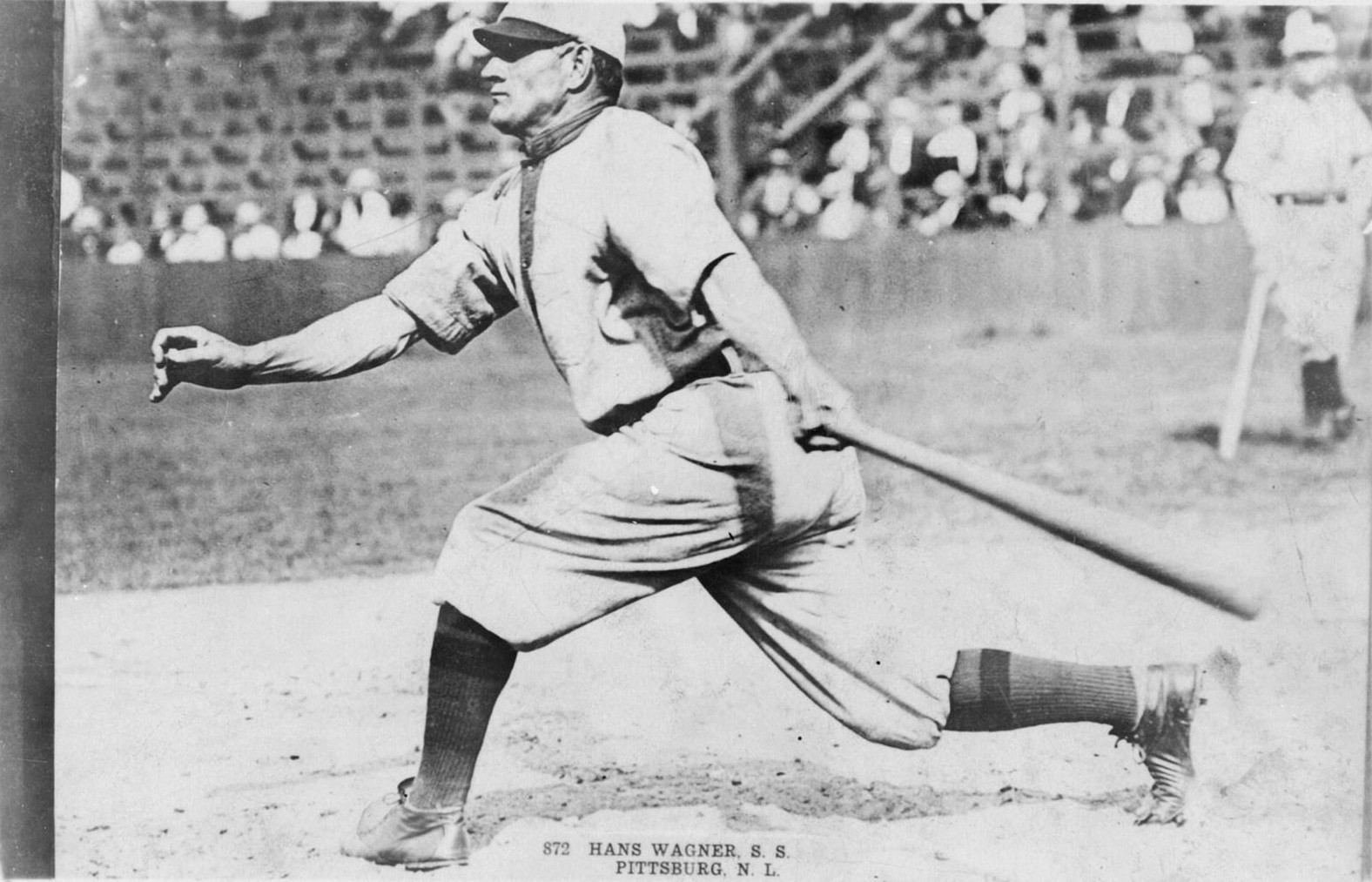
Honus Wagner 1911 batting

=== Minor league baseball ===
Along with hosting eight Major League teams, Whittington Park was the home to Hot Springs minor league teams. The Hot Springs Bathers played in the Cotton States League from 1938 to 1941 as an affiliate of the Chicago Cubs (1938) and the Detroit Tigers (1939-1941) and an earlier team called the Bathers played in the Arkansas State League in 1894 and 1897 and the Southwestern League in 1898. The Hot Springs Vaporites (1908–1909) and Hot Springs Vapors (1906) also played in the Arkansas State League.

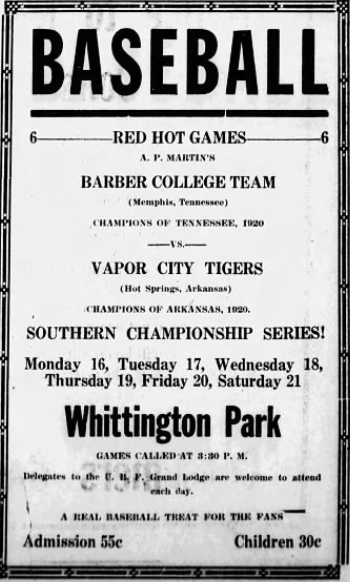
A. P. Martin's Barber College Team vs Vapor City Tigers, at Whittington Park, Baseball Ad

=== Baseball schools ===
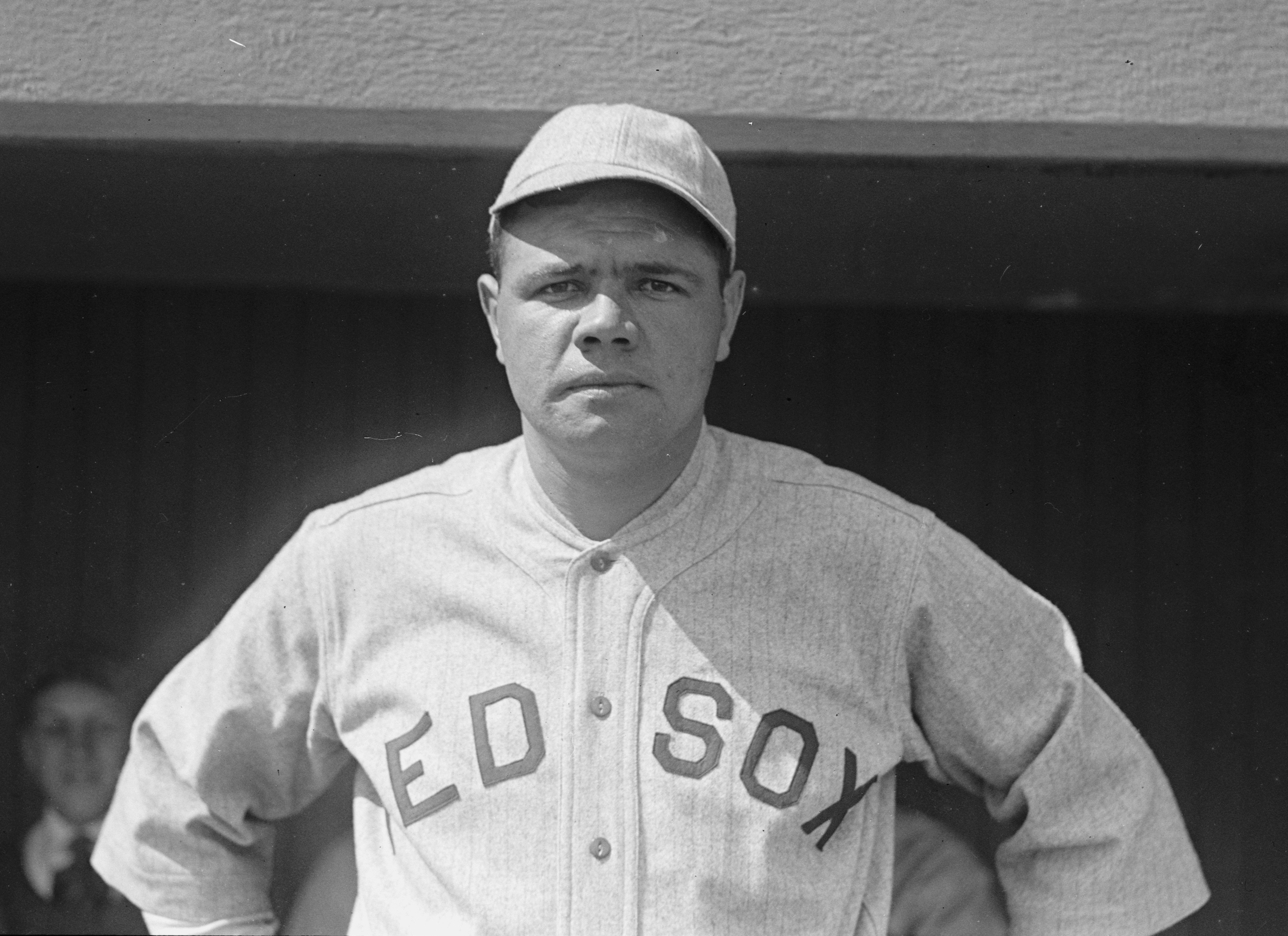
Babe Ruth Red Sox, 1918. In spring training 1918 Pitcher Babe Ruth hit a ball 573 feet (175 m). The ball landed in the alligator farm across the street from Whittington Park

From 1933 to 1938, Ray L. Doan operated the "All-Star Baseball School" at the park. The "school" attracted thousands of younger players, with 1938 topping at 450 attendees. Instructors included: Rogers Hornsby, Grover Cleveland Alexander, Red Faber, Dizzy Dean, George Sisler, Bob Feller, Tris Speaker and Burleigh Grimes. Attendees included legendary female athlete Babe Didrickson, who attended in 1934, after already being an Olympic Gold Medalist in the 1932 Summer Olympic Games. Future Major League player Sam Narron also enrolled. In 1936, Doan installed lights at the park to begin night usage and games.

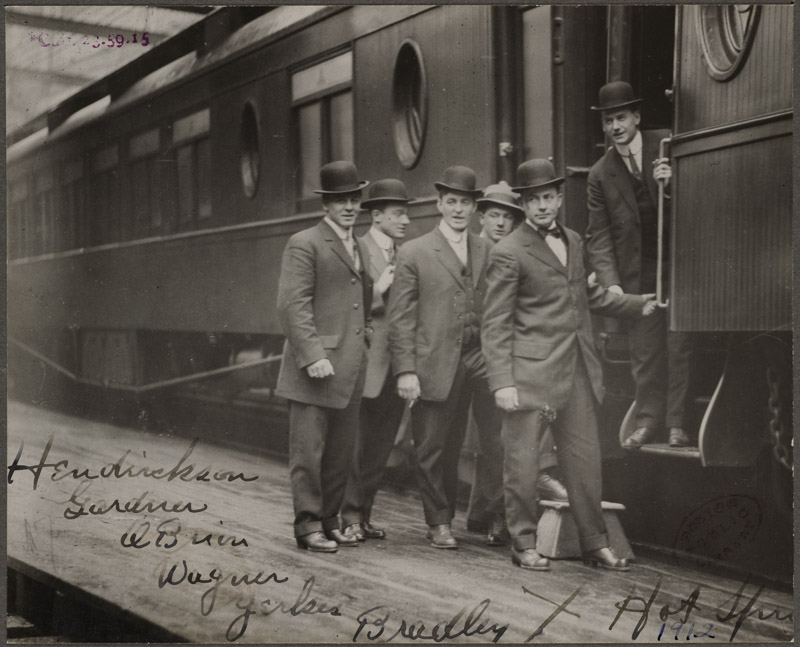
Boston Red Sox players in Hot Springs, Arkansas for spring training, left to right: Olaf Hendrikson, Larry Gardner, Buck O'Brien, Heinie Wagner, Steve Yerkes and Hugh Bradley boarding train

To coincide with Doan's "baseball School", Major League Umpire George Barr operated his George Barr Umpire School, which is recognized as the first ever umpire instructional school. Future Major League Umpires Bill McKinley and Scotty Robb were attendees.

In 1939, Hornsby took over for Doan and started the Rogers Hornsby Baseball College. Hornsby's operation was housed at Majestic Field, but utilized Whittington Park and other fields in Hot Springs, including Whittington Park and Fogel Field, which was located behind the Alligator Farm. Hornsby's college operated until 1952. Hornsby's "college" would attract 100-200 prospective professionals, with scouts present, for six week sessions. Hornsby had legendary instructors: Cy Young, Jimmie Foxx, Tris Speaker and Schoolboy Rowe.

=== End of the ball field (1947) ===
After World War II halted many baseball leagues, the Bathers were gone and Major League teams had moved to warmer climates for spring training. In 1942, the St. Louis Browns and Pittsburgh Pirates outlined plans to move their spring training from California to Ban Johnson Park. However those plans never materialized and the future use of Ban Johnson Field was affected. In 1947, with no baseball tenants, the 'Whittington Park Speedway' racetrack began operation on the site. To replace Ban Johnson Field, Jaycee Park was built at the Majestic Field site on the corner of Belding Avenue and Carson Street. Later, from 1948 to 1951, the Chicago White Sox would return Spring training to Hot Springs, utilizing Jaycee Field as their training site.

=== Wagner donates uniforms ===
The Pittsburgh Pirates trained for over a decade at Whittington Park. Hall of Fame shortstop Honus Wagner became a fixture in the city. As evidence of this Wagner purchased and donated basketball uniforms and equipment to Hot Springs High School in 1912. The uniforms were in the Pittsburgh Pirates colors of black and gold and subsequently the high school switched permanently to those colors. Wagner also refereed a basketball game for the school that season, something he would later repeat.

== The First Boys of Spring Documentary ==
Whittington Park and Ruth's home run are featured prominently in the Documentary The First Boys of Spring (2015). Produced by Larry Foley, the documentary on Hot Springs spring training is narrated by actor Billy Bob Thornton, a Hot Springs area native. The documentary began airing nationally on the MLB Network in February, 2016.

== Today ==
"Baseball Trail Park" at 1201 Whittington Ave. is part of the City of Hot Springs Park System. It is named in tribute to the Hot Springs Historic Baseball Trail and the ball fields that once existed nearby: Sam Guinn Field, Whittington Park and Fogel Field.

Today, the Whittington Park/Ban Johnson Park site is an asphalt parking lot for the Weyerhaeuser Company. There is a home plate marker in the parking lot. A section of cement bleachers remains visible in the adjacent hillside. The cement bleachers on the side of the hill was a fan section called the "Wolves Den". The Arkansas Alligator Farm and Petting Zoo is still across the street with a marker for the landing spot of Ruth's St. Patrick's Day Home Run. Artifacts related to Ban Johnson Park are on display at the Hot Springs Baseball Museum.

On March 24, 2018, a ceremony was held at the Whittington Park site to commemorate the 100th anniversary of the Babe Ruth home run. Babe Ruth's family was in attendance. Related events included Hall of Fame inductee Ferguson Jenkins and former All-Star Al Hrabosky, as well as noted baseball historians Bill Jenkinson and Tim Reid.

=== Historic markers ===
Today, there are four plaques at the site as part of the Hot Springs Historic Baseball Trail: Whittington Park, Mel Ott, Honus Wagner and Babe Ruth.

The Whittington Park marker reads:

More baseball was played in the ballpark on this corner than anywhere else in Hot Springs. Built here in 1894 and used until 1942, Whittington Park, which was later named Ban Johnson Field, was the epicenter of baseball in Hot Springs. A partial list of those who played classic games here includes: Cy Young, Honus Wagner, Buck Freeman, Sam Crawford, Walter Johnson, Tris Speaker, and Babe Ruth

The Mel Ott plaque reads as follows:

This Hall of Fame outfielder, personally tutored by John "Mugsy" McGraw, played his entire career with the New York Giants, hitting 511 home runs. On his 30th birthday, March 2, 1939, in an intra-squad game here at Whittington Park, "Master Melvin" belted three homers over the right field fence. He played alongside Hall of Famers Bill Terry and Carl Hubbell, to lift the Hal Schumacher team over the Carl Hubbell team, 10-6.

The plaque for Honus Wagner states:

No player left a bigger legacy in Hot Springs than "the Flying Dutchman." He enjoyed the baths and all the activities Hot Springs had to offer, he also participated in civic functions and coached the high school basketball team. Honus played in dozens of classic baseball games at Whittington Park. On March 19, 1911, he recorded a single, triple and home run, while his Hall of Fame manager, Fred Clarke, hit two home runs.

The plaque for Babe Ruth at the Arkansas Alligator Farm frontage states:

Ruth trained here nine times and became a very familiar face around Hot Springs. He hiked the mountains, took the baths, played golf, patronized the casinos, and visited the racetrack. On March 17, 1918 (St. Patrick's Day), he launched a mammoth home run from Whittington Park that landed on the fly, inside the Arkansas Alligator Farm. It has been measured at 573 feet, — baseball's first 500-foot-plus drive.
