= Spring training =

Training during the spring season, in baseball

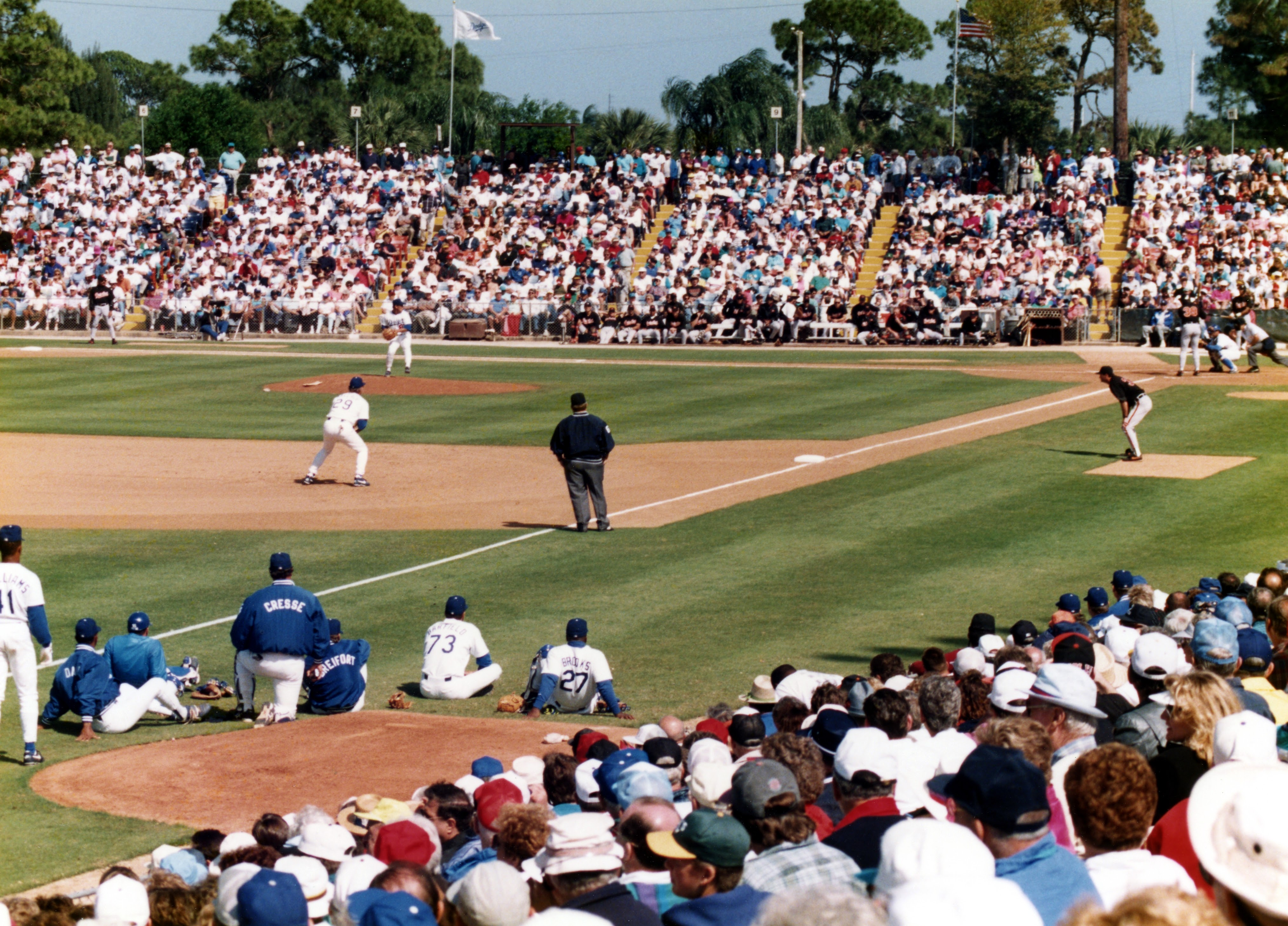
A 1994 Grapefruit League game at the LA Dodgers' former camp of Holman Stadium in Vero Beach, Florida

Spring training, also called spring camp, is the preseason of the Summer Professional Baseball Leagues, such as Major League Baseball (MLB), and it is a series of practices and exhibition games preceding the start of the regular season. Spring training allows new players to try out for the roster and position spots, and it gives established players practice time prior to competitive play. Spring training has always attracted fan attention, drawing crowds who travel to the warm climates (MLB goes to Arizona and Florida while the KBO, NPB, and CPBL go to Okinawa, Kyushu, Australia, and Taiwan) to enjoy the weather and watch their favorite teams play.

In modern MLB training, teams that train in Florida will play other Florida-training teams in their exhibition games, regardless of regular-season league affiliations. Likewise, Arizona-training teams will play other Arizona teams. This arrangement commenced long before either state received MLB franchises of their own, and thus at the time were widely considered "neutral" sites for preseason MLB play. All MLB teams (including those permanently based in Arizona and Florida) each own or hold a long-term lease for a spring training ballpark distinct from their regular stadium. These facilities are typically comparable to the AAA-caliber ballparks of Minor League Baseball.

Sometimes, teams will finish the preseason with games in their home ballpark (often against local opposition from the opposite league) although with the introduction of interleague play this has become less common. Over time, the Florida and Arizona preseason circuits were informally nicknamed the Grapefruit League and Cactus League, respectively, after plants typical of the respective states. All spring training activities are governed by direct negotiation between teams, or by Major League Baseball itself; there are no actual organizations incorporated as the "Grapefruit League" or "Cactus League." Both nicknames have been trademarked by MLB.

In the case of the Asian Leagues, teams tend to follow a similar logic, but those teams more commonly will temporarily travel to play in another team's region during their spring camp, also, most still usually finish the pre-season in their home stadiums right before the season.

Spring training typically starts in February and continues until just before Opening Day of the regular season, which falls in late March or the first week of April. In some years, teams not scheduled to play on Opening Day will play spring training games that day. Pitchers and catchers report to spring training first because pitchers benefit from a longer training period. A few days later, position players arrive and team practice begins. Exhibition games, also called Open Games in the NPB, usually begin in late February.

== MLB history ==
The New York Mutuals became perhaps the first baseball team to hold a spring training outside of their home when, in 1869, Boss Tweed sent the Mutuals south to New Orleans to prepare for the season. In the 1870s, several clubs began following the example set by the Mutuals by training in warmer climates. New Orleans was a popular location for spring training in the 19th century but teams also trained in Washington, D.C.; Savannah, Georgia; and Cape May, New Jersey, among other locations. In 1888, the Washington Nationals became the first club to hold spring training in Florida. The practice was not universally adopted, however. Critics including Cap Anson argued that players would be more prone to sore muscles and colds after returning to their colder home climates.

=== Hot Springs, Arkansas ===
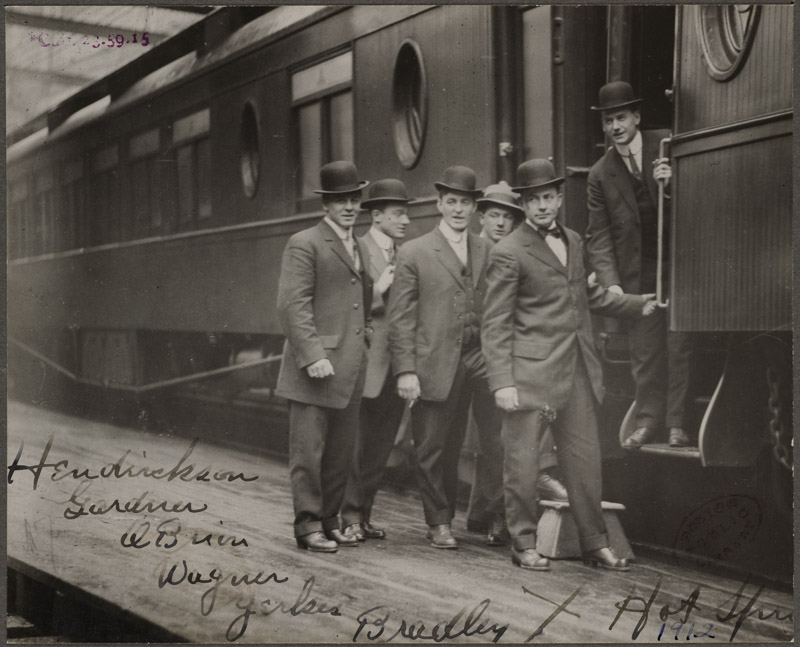
Boston Red Sox players (from L-R) Olaf Henriksen, Larry Gardner, Buck O'Brien, Heinie Wagner, Steve Yerkes, and Hugh Bradley in Hot Springs, Arkansas for spring training, 1912

Spring training by major league teams in sites other than their regular season game sites first became popular in the 1890s and by 1910 was in wide use. Hot Springs, Arkansas, has been called the original "birthplace" of spring training baseball. The location of Hot Springs and the concept of getting the players ready for the upcoming season was the brainchild of Chicago White Stockings (modern Chicago Cubs) team President Albert Spalding and Cap Anson. In 1886, the White Stockings traveled to Hot Springs to prepare for the upcoming season. After holding spring training at the Hot Springs Baseball Grounds, the White Stockings went on to have a successful season and other teams took notice. In subsequent years other teams joined Chicago and began holding spring training in Hot Springs, leading to the first spring training games. The Cleveland Spiders, Detroit Tigers, Pittsburgh Pirates, Cincinnati Reds, Brooklyn Dodgers, and Boston Red Sox followed the White Stockings to Hot Springs. Whittington Field/Ban Johnson Park (1894), Majestic Park (1909), and Fogel Field (1912) were all built in Hot Springs to host Major League teams.

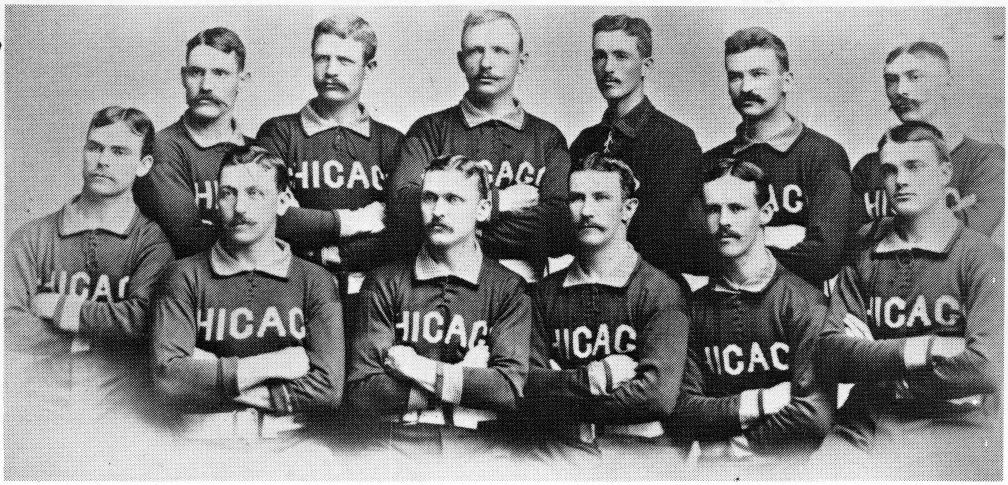
1885 Chicago White Stockings (modern Chicago Cubs)

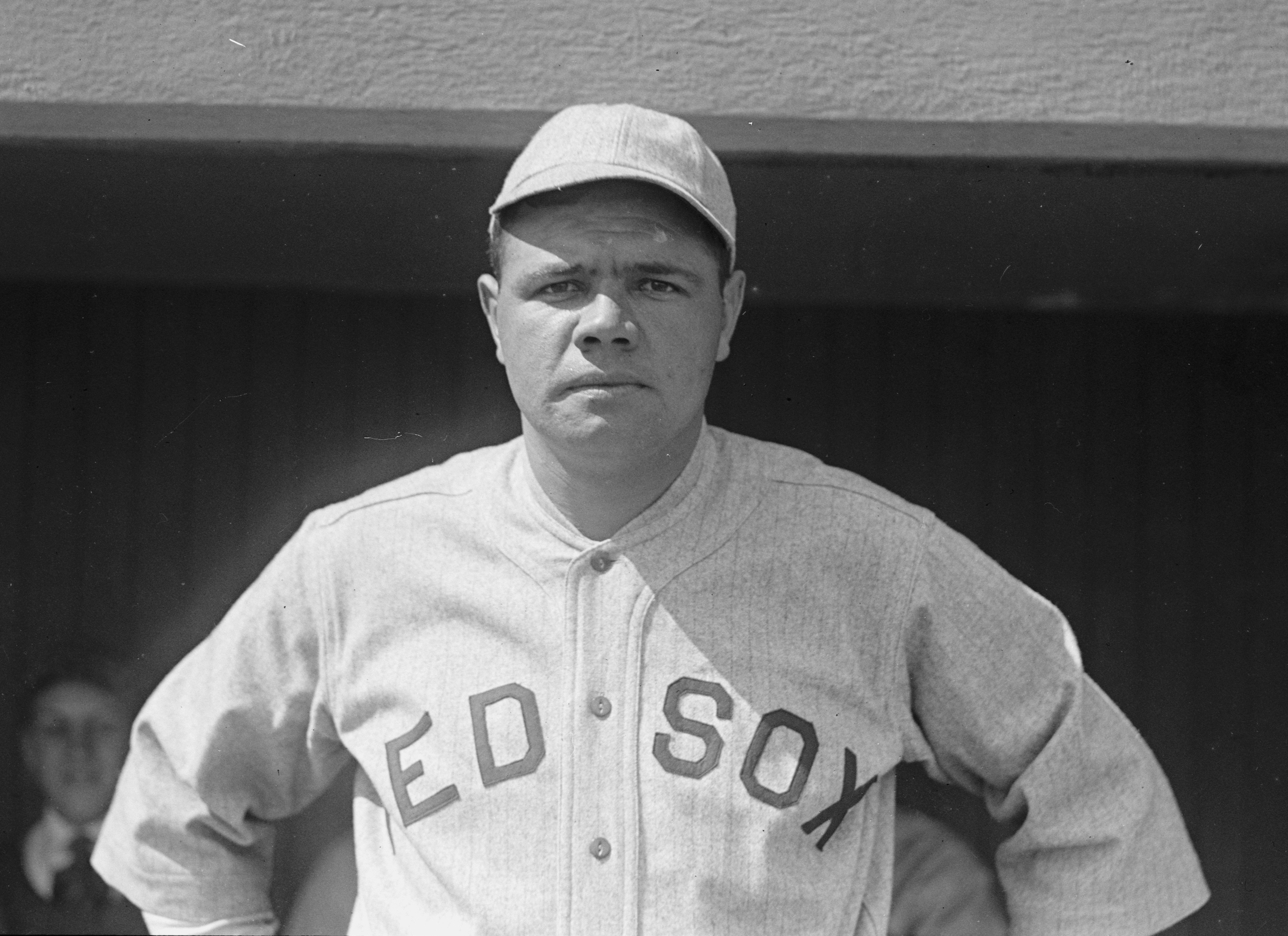
Babe Ruth hit a 573-foot (175 m) home run in spring training, 1918. He led the league with 11 home runs and had a 13–7 record as the Red Sox won the 1918 World Series.

Famously, on St. Patrick's Day in 1918, a successful young pitcher for the Red Sox named Babe Ruth was forced to play an emergency game at first base in a spring training game against Pittsburgh. This game possibly changed the course of baseball history, as it was the first time Ruth had ever played any position other than pitcher. Ruth responded by hitting two home runs that day in Hot Springs, with the second being a 573-foot (175 m) shot that landed across the street from Whittington Park in a pond of the Arkansas Alligator Farm and Petting Zoo. The Red Sox took notice and soon Ruth was playing the field more often. Over 130 Major League Baseball Hall of Famers, including Ruth, Anson, Cy Young, Honus Wagner, Ty Cobb, Tris Speaker, Walter Johnson, Rogers Hornsby, Mel Ott, Dizzy Dean, Jimmie Foxx, and Stan Musial, trained in Hot Springs. The First Boys of Spring is a 2015 documentary about Hot Springs Spring Training. The film was narrated by actor Billy Bob Thornton, an area native, and produced by filmmaker Larry Foley. The documentary began airing nationally on the MLB Network in February 2016.

Early training sites include the St. Louis Cardinals in Hot Springs and Tulsa, Oklahoma; the New York Yankees in Bermuda (1913), New Orleans, and later Phoenix, Arizona, when the team was owned by Del Webb; the Chicago Cubs in Los Angeles when owned by William Wrigley Jr.; the St. Louis Browns and later the Kansas City Athletics in San Diego and then in West Palm Beach, Florida; the Pittsburgh Pirates in Dawson Springs, Kentucky around 1915 and Honolulu, while other teams joined in by the early 1940s. The Detroit Tigers are credited with being the first team to conduct spring training camp in Arizona. They trained in Phoenix at Riverside Park at Central Avenue and the Salt River in 1929.

=== Founding of the Grapefruit League ===
The Philadelphia Phillies were the first of the major-league teams to train in Florida, when they spent two weeks in Jacksonville, Florida in 1889. Spring training in Florida began in earnest in 1913, when the Chicago Cubs trained in Tampa and the Cleveland Indians in Pensacola. One year later, two other teams moved to Florida for spring training, the real start of the Grapefruit League. Except for a couple of years during World War II, when travel restrictions prevented teams from training south of the Potomac and Ohio Rivers, Florida hosted more than half of the spring training teams through 2009. Since 2010, major league teams have been equally divided between Arizona and Florida during spring training, with 15 teams in Florida and 15 teams in Arizona. All but six of the major league teams have gone to spring training in Florida at one time or another (Anaheim Angels, Milwaukee Brewers, Seattle Mariners, San Diego Padres, Colorado Rockies and Arizona Diamondbacks). Many of the most famous players in baseball history (Ruth, Gehrig, Musial, Cobb, Mays, DiMaggio, Berra, Mantle, and many more) have called Florida home for four to six weeks every spring.

=== Founding of the Cactus League ===
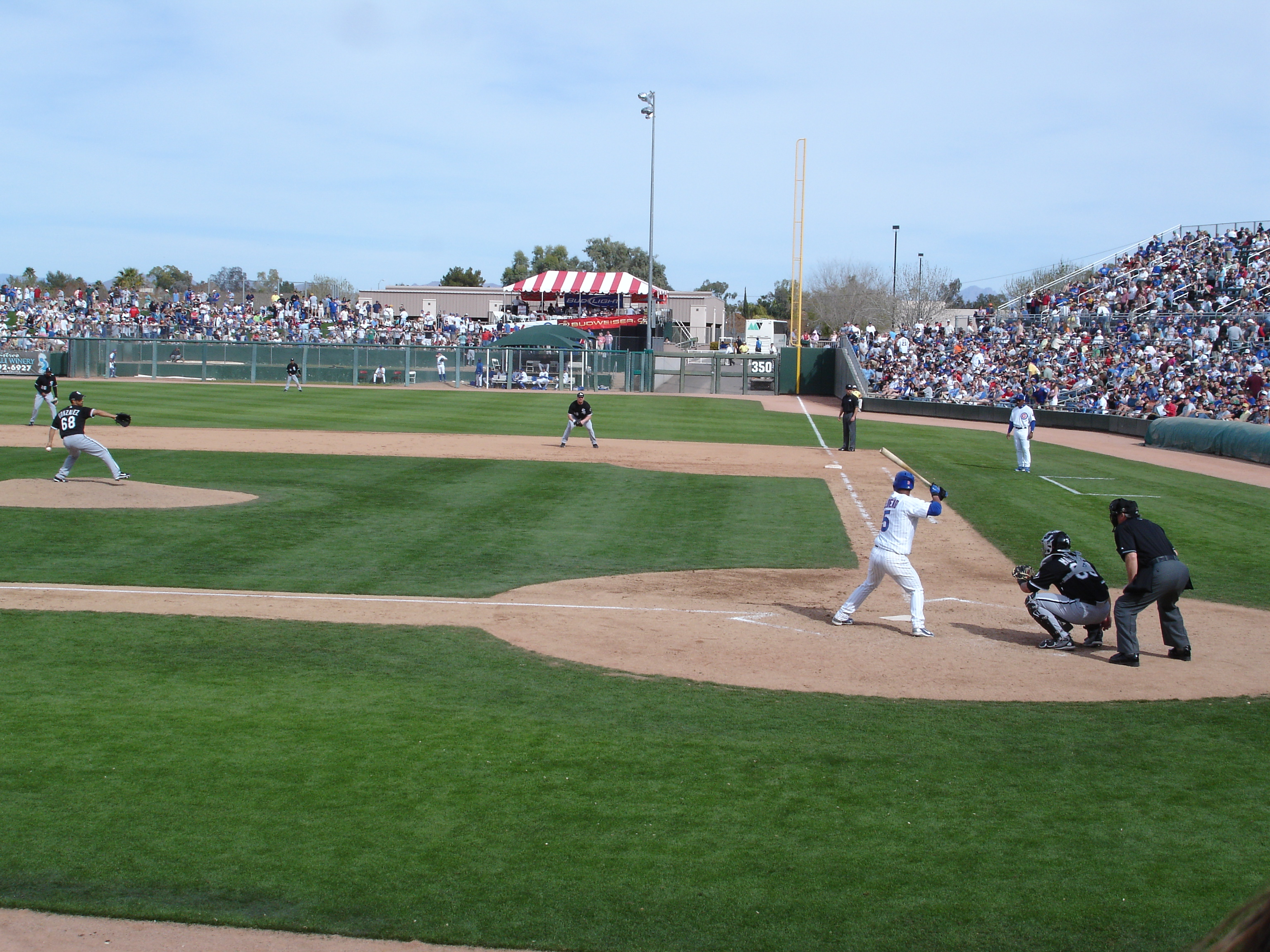
A 2007 Cactus League game between the Cubs and the White Sox at HoHoKam Park

According to the autobiography of former Cleveland Indians owner Bill Veeck, the avoidance of racism was one reason the Cactus League was established. In the mid 1940's, Veeck was the owner of the minor league Milwaukee Brewers and the team trained in Ocala, Florida. Veeck inadvertently sat in the Black section of the segregated stands and engaged in conversation with a couple of fans. According to Veeck's book, the local law enforcement told Veeck he could not sit in that section, and then called the Ocala mayor when Veeck argued back. The mayor finally backed down when Veeck threatened to take his team elsewhere for spring training and promised to let the country know why.

Veeck sold the Brewers in 1945 and temporarily retired to a ranch in Tucson, Arizona, but purchased the Cleveland Indians in 1946. Intending to introduce African-American players, Veeck decided to buck tradition and train the Indians in Tucson and convinced the New York Giants to give Phoenix a try. Thus the Cactus League was born. In 1947, Veeck signed Larry Doby to the Indians. Doby was the second African-American to play MLB in the 20th century, and the first in the American League.

Arizona had eight teams in the Cactus League in 1989, with the other eighteen in Florida. By 2018, the split was even, with 15 teams training in each location.

=== Other spring training sites ===
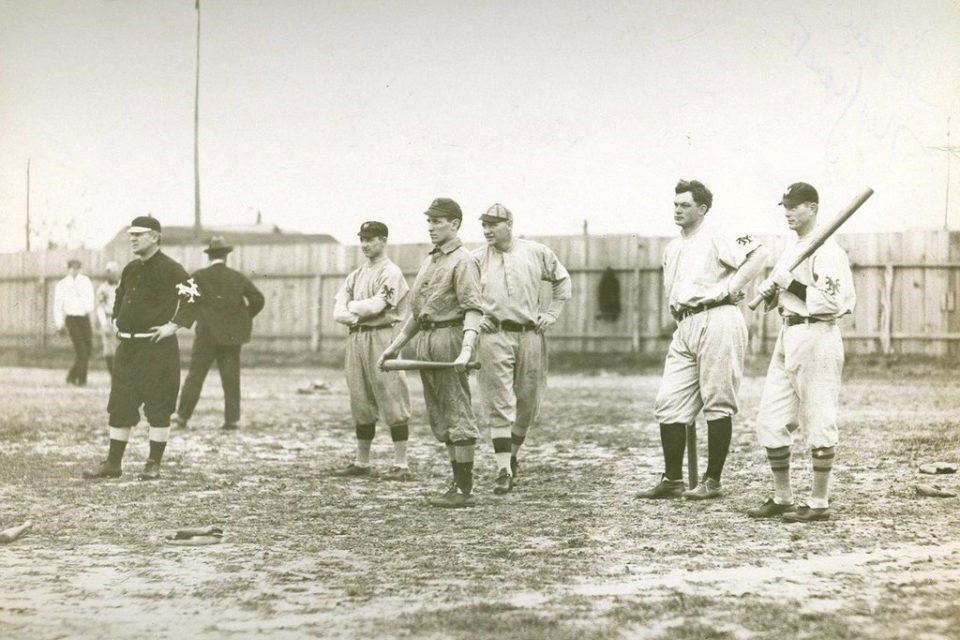
New York Giants during Spring Training in Marlin, Texas (circa 1915)

While Florida and Arizona host all Major League Baseball teams for spring training, this has not always been the case. Especially in the early 20th century, baseball clubs did not build facilities dedicated to spring training and would use local facilities in various cities, sometimes changing spring training sites on an annual basis. The Cleveland Indians, for example, held spring training in seven different cities – including New Orleans, Dallas, and Macon, Georgia – between 1902 and 1922. This was not uncommon at the time. The New York Giants likely built the first "permanent" spring training facility in Marlin, Texas. The Giants trained in Marlin from 1908 to 1918 and built Emerson Park and adjacent parks for spring training activities. The city of Marlin deeded the land to the ballclub.

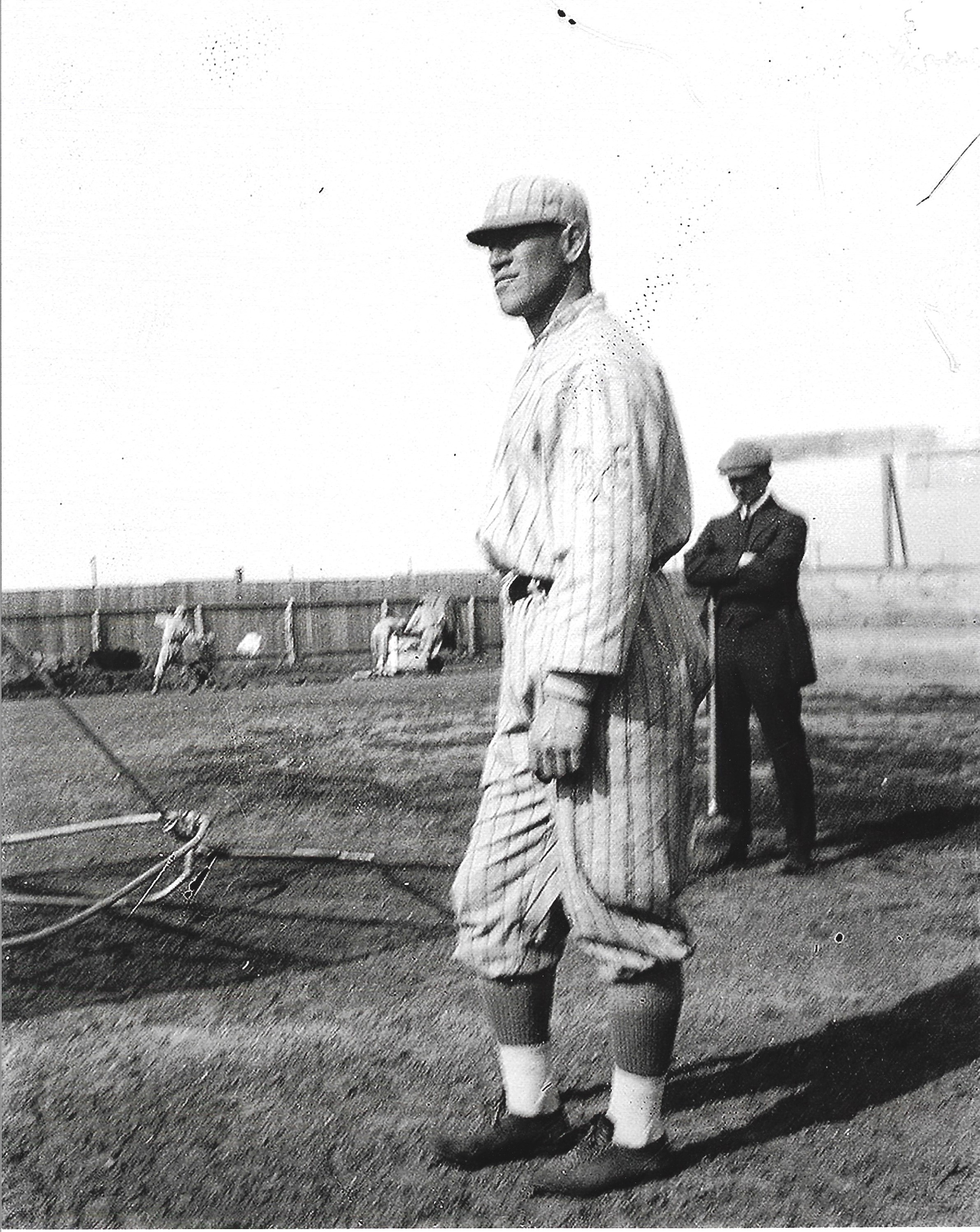
Jim Thorpe, US Olympian, New York Giants Spring Training in Marlin, Texas, likely 1918

During World War II, most teams held an abbreviated spring training within easy reach of their cities. In order to conserve rail transport during the war, 1943's Spring Training was limited to an area east of the Mississippi River and north of the Ohio River. The Chicago White Sox held camp in French Lick, Indiana; the Washington Senators in College Park, Maryland; and the New York Yankees in Asbury Park, New Jersey.

After World War II, some teams trained outside of the United States. The Brooklyn Dodgers trained in Havana, Cuba in 1947 and 1949, and in the Dominican Republic in 1948. The New York Yankees also trained in the early 1950s in Cuba and the Dominican Republic. Spring training camps and games were also held in Hawaii, Puerto Rico, and northern Mexico, sometimes by visiting major league teams in the 1950s and 1960s.

Before and shortly after big league baseball reached the West Coast, a number of teams trained in the state of California or along the state line. The Chicago Cubs trained on Catalina Island in the 1920s, '30s, and '40s. Early in their history, the then-California Angels held spring training in Palm Springs, California from 1961 to 1993, the San Diego Padres in Yuma, Arizona from 1969 to 1993, the Oakland Athletics in Las Vegas, Nevada in the 1970s, and other major league teams had trained in El Centro, Riverside, and San Bernardino.

=== International MLB spring training ===
In 2015, 2016 and 2019, MLB has hosted spring training games in Mexico. In 2015, the Arizona Diamondbacks played against the Colorado Rockies at Estadio Sonora, Hermosillo. A year later, the San Diego Padres hosted the Houston Astros at Estadio Fray Nano in Mexico City. Finally, in 2019, the Diamondbacks played once again against the Rockies but, this time, at Estadio de Béisbol Monterrey in Monterrey. In 2020, MLB hosted a spring training game between the Minnesota Twins and the Detroit Tigers at Estadio Quisqueya in Santo Domingo. In 2024, the Rays and Red Sox played the inaugural Dominican Republic series in Santo Domingo. The series resulted in a split, 1-1, and showcased Dominican talent while honoring players that have been developed through Dominican Republic Academies. On March 24–25, 2025, the Red Sox concluded their spring training with two games in Monterrey, Mexico, against the Monterrey Sultanes.

=== MLB Spring Breakout ===
Beginning in 2024, a portion of spring training features Spring Breakout, a series of games featuring rosters of top prospects from the teams' minor league affiliates. The games are typically held as part of doubleheaders with the respective teams' main rosters. Commissioner Rob Manfred stated that the games were "a new opportunity to showcase the future stars of the game as they continue on their journey to the Major Leagues".

== Non-MLB professional training camps ==
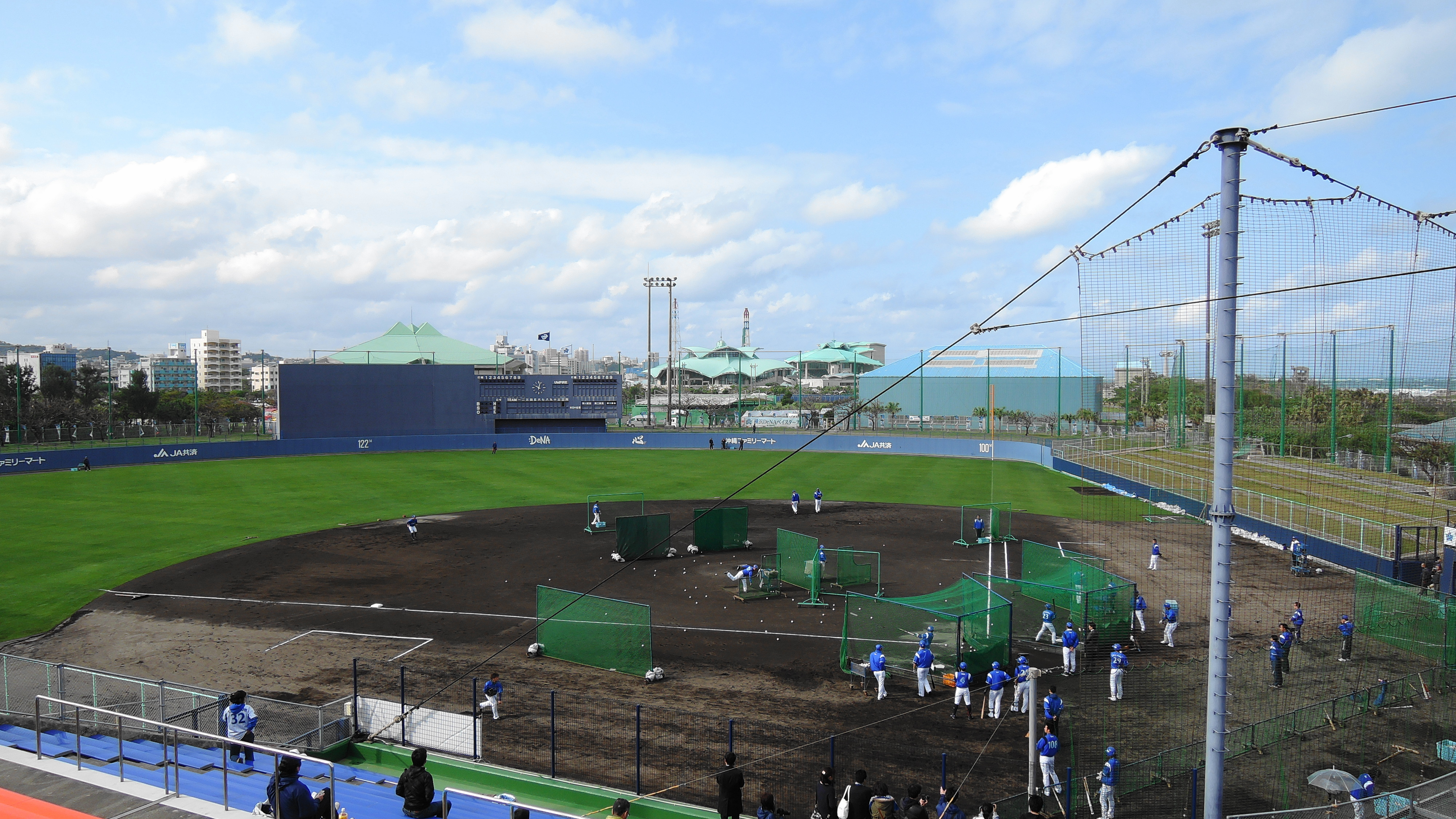
A batting practice during the Yokohama DeNA Baystars 2014 Spring Camp in Ginowan, Okinawa

The concept of spring training is not limited to North America; the Asian baseball leagues in Japan (NPB), Taiwan (CPBL) and South Korea (KBO) adopt spring training and preseason games following similar styles as MLB. In Japan it's called Shunki kyanpu (春季キャンプ), in Korean: 스프링캠프; RR: seupeuling kaempeu.

Some teams also do training after the regular season, in what is called Fall Camp or Fall Training, Shūki kyanpu (秋季キャンプ) in Japanese.

As a warm up to the World Baseball Classic, National Teams play exhibition games at Spring Training sites against MLB, NPB or CPBL spring training squads.

The first Asian team training camp was done in 1934, by the later-Yomiuri Giants, the camp was done in Chiba Prefecture in preparation of games against Major League Baseball teams in the following year. The first KBO Spring Training outside Korea was in 1989. Before then, travel restrictions made it impossible for those teams go outside Korea for a pre-season practice camp.

== Spring training locations ==
=== MLB Spring League locations ===
Generally, MLB teams train in either Florida or Arizona based on their geographic location in North America, with eastern teams playing in Florida and western teams training in Arizona; the exceptions being the Cleveland Guardians, Cincinnati Reds, Milwaukee Brewers, and the two Chicago-based teams all training in Arizona; and the Houston Astros, Minnesota Twins and St. Louis Cardinals training in Florida. The last West Coast team to train in Florida was the Los Angeles Dodgers, who moved to Arizona in 2009.

Spring training MLB teams can play colleges, minor league baseball clubs, intra-squad games (members of the same team play against each other), split-squad games (games when one team is scheduled for two games in one day, so the team splits into two squads and each squad plays in one of the games), and B Games (unofficial spring training games where statistics and standings are not counted). The players union will sometimes operate its own training facility if many free agents are unsigned by the start of spring training.

==== Grapefruit League ====
Grapefruit League
Current Grapefruit League team locations:
One team
Two teams

The origin of the name "Grapefruit League" has several explanations. One popular myth was that Casey Stengel threw a grapefruit at Brooklyn Dodgers manager Wilbert Robinson. The accepted version is that aviator Ruth Law threw the grapefruit. In 1915, Law had been throwing golf balls from her airplane to advertise a golf course. Someone suggested throwing a baseball from her airplane. Robinson, whose team was in the Daytona Beach area for spring training, agreed to try to catch the baseball. Flying 525 feet (160 m) above Robinson, Law realized she had forgotten her baseball and threw a grapefruit that she had. When Robinson tried to catch it, the grapefruit exploded in his face, at first leading him to believe he had been seriously injured. (Note: A contemporaneous account, published in The Daytona Daily News on March 17, 1915, reported that Robinson misjudged the catch, resulting in the grapefruit hitting him on the arm.)

Grapefruit League teams primarily play against the others located on the same coast, rarely traveling to the other side of Florida for spring training games. The Astros, Cardinals, Marlins, Mets, and Nationals—all of whom play on the Atlantic Coast—play the majority of their games against each other, only playing three or four games against opponents located on the Gulf Coast.

Following is the list of spring training locations by team in the Grapefruit League in Florida:

Team	Ballpark	Capacity	City
Atlanta Braves	CoolToday Park	8,000	North Port
Baltimore Orioles	Ed Smith Stadium	8,500	Sarasota
Boston Red Sox	JetBlue Park	10,823	Fort Myers
Detroit Tigers	Publix Field at Joker Marchant Stadium	8,500	Lakeland
Houston Astros	CACTI Park of the Palm Beaches	7,858	West Palm Beach
Washington Nationals	CACTI Park of the Palm Beaches	7,858	West Palm Beach
Miami Marlins	Roger Dean Stadium	6,871	Jupiter
St. Louis Cardinals	Roger Dean Stadium	6,871	Jupiter
Minnesota Twins	Hammond Stadium	9,300	Fort Myers
New York Mets	Clover Park	7,160	Port St. Lucie
New York Yankees	George M. Steinbrenner Field	11,026	Tampa
Philadelphia Phillies	BayCare Ballpark	8,500	Clearwater
Pittsburgh Pirates	LECOM Park	8,500	Bradenton
Tampa Bay Rays	Charlotte Sports Park	7,670	Port Charlotte
Toronto Blue Jays	TD Ballpark	8,500	Dunedin

==== Cactus League ====
Cactus League
Current Cactus League team locations:
One team
Two teams

Unlike the Grapefruit League, teams in the Cactus League often share stadiums; of the 15 teams who train in Arizona, only the Cubs, Angels, Brewers, Giants, and Athletics have their own home stadiums. The Cactus League teams are all within the Phoenix metropolitan area (as of 2014 when the Diamondbacks and Rockies left Tucson for their new shared facility, Salt River Fields at Talking Stick).

The newest stadium built for MLB spring training is Sloan Park, the spring training home for the Chicago Cubs in Mesa, Arizona, which opened in February 2014. The oldest stadium in Cactus League spring training is Tempe Diablo Stadium, built in 1969.

According to the Arizona Republic, the Cactus League generates more than $300 million a year in economic impact to the greater Phoenix metropolitan area economy. The Arizona Republic newspaper reports that more than $500 million has been spent on "building eight new stadiums and renovating two others for the 15 teams in the Valley."

Attendance set a new record at 2011 Cactus League games with 1.59 million attending games at the various stadiums in the Phoenix metro area. Much of the attendance surge is attributed to the Salt River Fields at Talking Stick venue that accounted for 22 percent of the Cactus League attendance.

Following is the list of spring training locations by team in the Cactus League in Arizona:

Team	Ballpark	Capacity	City
Arizona Diamondbacks	Salt River Fields at Talking Stick	11,000	Salt River Pima-Maricopa Indian Community
Colorado Rockies	Salt River Fields at Talking Stick	11,000	Salt River Pima-Maricopa Indian Community
Athletics	Hohokam Stadium	10,500	Mesa
Chicago Cubs	Sloan Park	15,000	Mesa
Chicago White Sox	Camelback Ranch	13,000	Glendale
Los Angeles Dodgers	Camelback Ranch	13,000	Glendale
Cincinnati Reds	Goodyear Ballpark	10,311	Goodyear
Cleveland Guardians	Goodyear Ballpark	10,311	Goodyear
Kansas City Royals	Surprise Stadium	10,500	Surprise
Texas Rangers	Surprise Stadium	10,500	Surprise
Los Angeles Angels	Tempe Diablo Stadium	9,558	Tempe
Milwaukee Brewers	American Family Fields of Phoenix	10,000	Phoenix
San Diego Padres	Peoria Sports Complex	12,339	Peoria
Seattle Mariners	Peoria Sports Complex	12,339	Peoria
San Francisco Giants	Scottsdale Stadium	12,000	Scottsdale

=== Asian Leagues ===
Asian Leagues tend to divide themselves between the Japanese regions of Kyushu and Okinawa, the following is the list of home base of the Asian teams divided by their local league as the 2026 Season

==== Nippon Professional Baseball (Japan) ====
Main teams camps in Kyushu

Team	Ballpark	Capacity	City
Yomuri Giants A	Sun Marine Stadium Miyazaki	30,000	Miyazaki, Miyazaki Prefecture
Hiroshima Toyo Carp A	Nichinan Tempuku Baseball Stadium	2,000	Nichinan, Miyazaki Prefecture
Chiba Lotte Marines A	Miyakonojo Athletics Park Baseball Stadium	6,000	Miyakonojo, Miyazaki Prefecture
Saitama Seibu Lions	Nango Stadium	10,000	Nichinan, Miyazaki Prefecture
ORIX Buffaloes	Kiyotake Athletic Park SOKKEN Stadium	5,500	Kiyotake, Miyazaki Prefecture
Fukuoka SoftBank Hawks	Ikumemori Sports Park Ivy Stadium	11,000	Miyazaki, Miyazaki Prefecture

Main teams camps in Okinawa

Team	Ballpark	Capacity	City
Yomuri Giants B	Okinawa Cellular Stadium Naha	30,000	Naha
Hiroshima Toyo Carp B	Koza Shinkin Stadium	15,000	Okinawa City
Tokyo Yakult Swallows	ANA BALLPARK Urasoe	14,500	Urasoe
Yokohama DeNA Baystars	Union Desukara Stadium	11,800	Ginowan
Chunichi Dragons	Agre Stadium Chatan	11,000	Chatan
Hanshin Tigers	Entry Ginoza Stadium	7,700	Ginoza Village
Hokkaido Nippon-Ham Fighters	Enagic Stadium Nago	4,000	Nago
Tohoku Rakuten Golden Eagles	Kin Baseball Stadium	2,145	Kin
Chiba Lotte Marines B	Itoman City nishizaki Baseball Stadium	12,000	Itoman

== Statistics ==
Statistics are recorded during spring training games, but tend to be not combined with the listed statistics for regular season games, and unusual performances which would have broken records if accomplished during the regular season are considered to be unofficial.

For example, on March 14, 2000, the MLB's Red Sox used six pitchers to achieve a 5–0 perfect game victory over the Toronto Blue Jays. A perfect game is considered a crowning accomplishment during the regular season or postseason, but in spring training it attracts little notice. Starting pitcher Pedro Martínez, who lost a perfect game in extra innings in 1995 while pitching for the former Montreal Expos, was talking to reporters at the conclusion of the game, rather than watching the final pitches. Reliever Rod Beck, who finished the game, did not realize the nature of his accomplishment until informed by catcher Joe Siddall. Many fans also left before the game's conclusion.

Although spring training statistics are unofficial, teams frequently use players' spring training performances as a way of assigning starting roles and roster spots on the club, many players see spring training as vital to guaranteeing their opening day roster spots.

== MLB experimentations ==
Spring training usually is the time of calendar year that MLB uses to make improvements to the league rules. These changes to the league rules allow for MLB to adapt to the modern day of playing baseball and set up teams throughout the league for success. The league also experiments with on-field personnel to determine the best umpire crews, home plate umpires, and field umpires.

=== 2023 changes ===
In 2023, the pitch clock was implemented. The timer was developed to create a quicker pace of play and allow for more fans to actively watch games. Timers of 30 seconds between batters, 15 seconds between pitches, and 20 seconds between pitches with runners on base have drastically reduced playing times. Pitchers were also limited to two disengagements from the mound per plate appearance. Any time a pitcher disengages with the mound after the first two disengagements have been used, the pitcher is charged with a balk. These factors have contributed to the increased pace of play and allow for games to move quicker. After the pitch clock's success throughout spring training, it was ultimately placed into effect for the 2023 MLB season. Along with the experimentation of the pitch clock, spring training also tested out larger bases to protect player's safety and a shift restriction to promote more exciting plays. Although home plate remained unchanged, all other bases within the field of play increased in size. The base sizes increased from 15 inches square to 18 inches square and slightly reduced the distance between bases. Defensive shift limit rules included four infielders staying within the boundary of the infield dirt, two infielders staying on each side of second base, and had no restrictions on outfielders.

=== 2024 changes ===
Although positive feedback had been received about the rules changes during the 2023 season, the 2024 spring training season sparked controversy. Nike, MLB's uniform provider, conducted a redesign of player jerseys and pants to allow for better athletic performance. Player's last names and numbers decreased in size making the uniforms look unappealing to both players and fans. As a result of the backlash, MLB and Nike redesigned the jerseys for the 2025 season to allow for both effective performance and appeal.

=== Umpires ===
In a predominately male job, the 2024 spring training season saw the first woman umpire since Ria Cortesio in 2007. On February 24, Jen Pawol was a field umpire for the Astros and Nationals game. She began the game with three innings umpiring third base followed by an additional three innings at both second and first as well. CACTI Park of the Palm Beaches hosted 3,655 people to witness history as Pawol umpired a 7-4 Astros victory. She credits the women that umpired before her for paving an exciting career path for women in the future. She made her MLB debut on August 9, 2025.

== Extended North American spring training ==
An extended spring training game in Sarasota, Florida, during the 2008 season

Minor league players participate in spring training following a telescoped schedule that generally lasts from March 1 to 31. At its conclusion, most players are assigned to farm team rosters to begin the minor league season. However, those players deemed unready for a full-season campaign—through inexperience or injury—are assigned to "extended spring training", a structured program of workouts, rehabilitation sessions, simulated games, and exhibition games based in the major league parent team's minor league training complex. If a player is later deemed ready to participate in full-season league action, he is promoted to an appropriate-level farm club. When short-season leagues (Rookie league, or previously Class A Short Season) begin play in late June, extended spring training players are assigned to those rosters, placed on the injured list, or released.

== Conflicts ==
Since 2006, every few years the World Baseball Classic impacts on how spring training occurs. The tournament runs throughout the month of March with the opportunity for players to represent their countries and play for their national teams. This impacts spring training as many star players opt-in to represent their country rather than prepare for the upcoming season with their respective teams. This leaves teams in tough situations as they are forced to build their lineups, sell tickets, and play games without their star players. However, players opt-in to play in the tournament's games due to the intense competitive atmosphere, fan appeal and fan pressure in the countries they represent. Since these games take early into the baseball season, this leads to a certain risk of injury among pitchers as well as conflicting development within teams. A famous exemple happened during the 2023 WBC, Mets pitcher Edwin Diaz suffered a torn patellar tendon in a freak accident after the game, leaving him out for the entire MLB season of that year. Diaz's injury has left some MLB team fans concerned with letting their star players play under another team's supervision. Although, since 2006, Pitchers have to follow tight WBC rules that limit the number of pitches per game during the tournament.

Clubs may also play friendly games as part of their spring training with the national teams playing in the Classic as preparation for both teams.

MLB has also decided to make regular season games begin a few days before the end of Spring Training, as was the case in 2024 with the MLB Seoul Series and 2025 with MLB Tokyo Series. Due to logistical reasons, players need to leave early to those countries, and then come back a few days before opening day.
