= Majestic Park =

One of the first Major League Baseball spring training facilities

Majestic Park 1908–1935, 2019
- Dean Field (1935–1947); Jaycee Park (1947–2019)
- Interactive map of Majestic Park; 1908–1935, 2019
- Former names: Dean Field (1935–1947); Jaycee Park (1947–2019)
- Location: Belding Street and Carson Street; 109 West Belding Street; Hot Springs, Arkansas, 71901; United States
- Coordinates: 34°29.7274′N 93°3.0985′W
- Owner: City of Hot Springs
- Operator: City of Hot Springs
- Capacity: 1,500
- Surface: Grass (1908–2018); Artificial surface (2019)

Construction
- Groundbreaking: 1908
- Opened: 1908
- Renovated: 1909, 1919, 1947, 2019
- Expanded: 1909, 1947
- Closed: 1918, 2019
- Demolished: 1918, 1947, 2019
- Cost: $9 Million
- Project managers: Hill & Cox Corp

Tenants
- Major League Spring Training; Detroit Tigers (1908); Boston Red Sox (1909–1910, 1912–1918); Cincinnati Reds (1910–1911); Brooklyn Dodgers (1910); St. Louis Browns (1911); Baseball Schools; Ray Doan Baseball School; Rogers Hornsby Baseball College; George Barr Umpire School; Minor League; Hot Springs Bathers (CSL) (1947–1955); Chicago White Sox-Minor League Camp (1948–1951); Summer collegiate Natural State Collegiate League (2022-present)

The original Majestic Park was one of the first Major League Baseball spring training facilities. The ballpark was located at the corner of Belding Street and Carson Street in Hot Springs, Arkansas. Today, the site is in use by Champion Christian College, National Park College, and travel/tournament baseball and softball. Majestic Park has been renovated by the City of Hot Springs. Babe Ruth, Cy Young, Jackie Robinson and Hank Aaron are among the many who have played at the site.

== History ==
After first serving as a site for a half–mile race track, the ballpark was built by the Detroit Tigers as a practice field in 1908. Majestic Park then was upgraded to become the spring training site of the Boston Red Sox and their star pitcher Babe Ruth in 1909–10 and 1912–18. The Cincinnati Reds (1910–1911), Brooklyn Dodgers (1910) and St. Louis Browns (1911) also held spring training at Majestic Park. The location later became the site of Dean Field (1935–1947)/Jaycee Park (1947–2019). Dean Field served as home to the Rogers Hornsby Baseball College.

The "Majestic Park" name corresponds to the Majestic Hotel, which was located in Hot Springs and housed the Boston Red Sox during their spring training seasons in Hot Springs.

The Hot Springs Bathers minor league team and the Chicago White Sox (1948–1951) minor league spring training were held at Jaycee Park. Jaycee Park hosted the 1952 Negro World Series featuring Hank Aaron and a 1953 exhibition game featuring Jackie Robinson.

The site can claim games featuring both All-time Home Run record holders, Babe Ruth and Hank Aaron as among those who have played at the site. In 1914, Babe Ruth was just beginning his career (as a dominant left-handed pitcher) for the Red Sox, while a young Aaron played in the 1952 Negro World Series.

Today, the site underwent an 8.5 million dollar renovation, completed in the spring of 2021. The site has four historical plaques, as part of the Hot Springs Historic Baseball Trail. Majestic Field, Rogers Hornsby, Jackie Robinson and Hank Aaron each have historical plaques on the site.

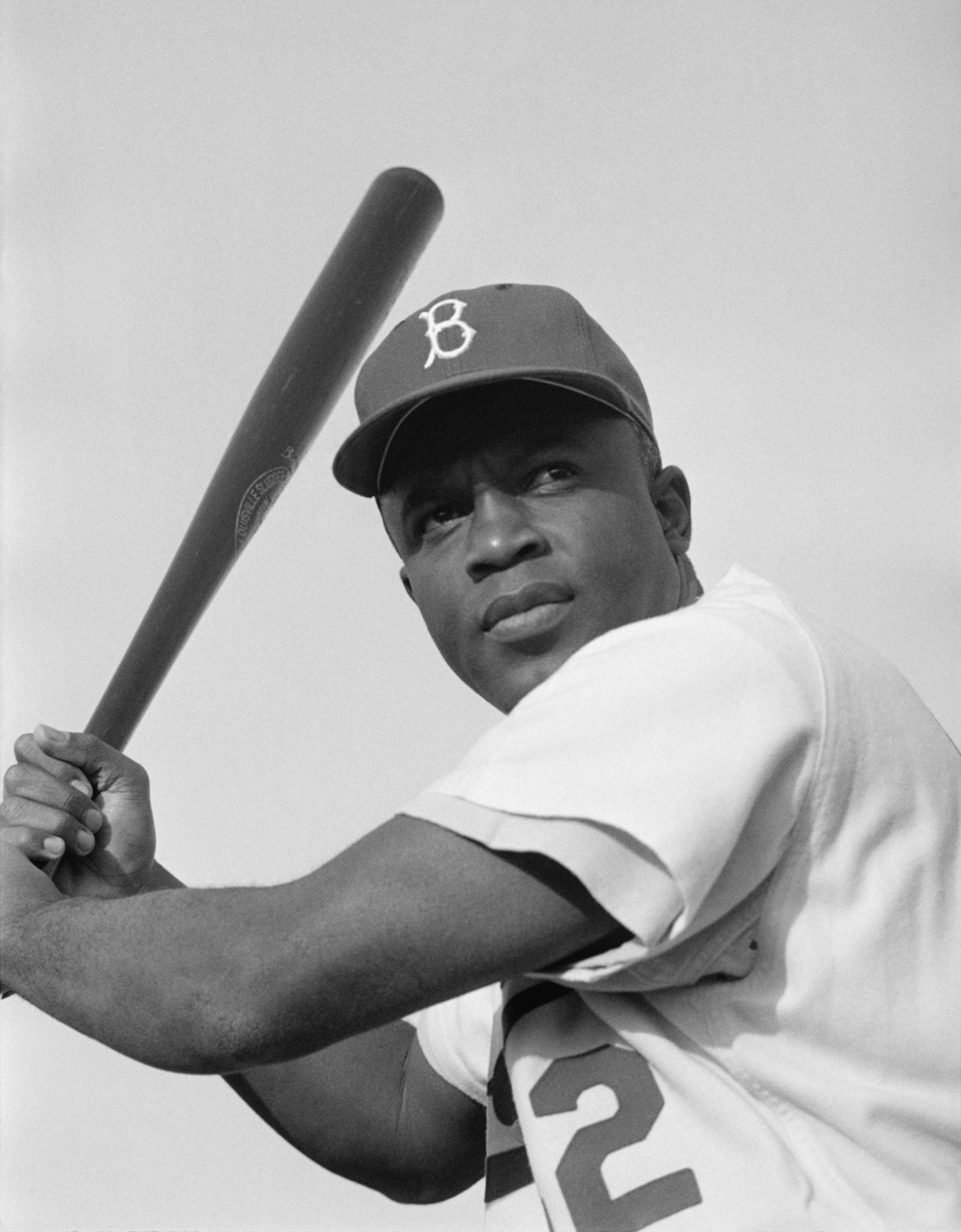
(1954)Jackie Robinson. Brooklyn Dodgers.

Along with Babe Ruth, Jackie Robinson and Hank Aaron, others who performed at the site include Ty Cobb, Honus Wagner, Jimmie Foxx, Gil Hodges, Harry Hooper, Cy Young, Rogers Hornsby, Grover Cleveland Alexander, Herb Pennock, Tris Speaker, and Walter Johnson. The Sporting News (1998) ranking of the greatest players ever listed: Babe Ruth (1), Ty Cobb (3), Walter Johnson (4), Hank Aaron (5) and Rogers Hornsby (9).

== Baseball in Hot Springs ==
Often called the "birthplace" of Spring Training baseball, Hot Springs first welcomed Major League Baseball in 1886, when the Chicago White Stockings (now the Chicago Cubs), brought their coaches and players to the city in preparation for the upcoming season. Team President Albert Spalding (owner of Spalding Sporting Goods) and the team's player/manager Cap Anson, thought the city was an ideal training site for the players. The first baseball location was Hot Springs Baseball Grounds. Many other Major League teams followed and began training in Hot Springs. Needing venues for teams to use, Whittington Park was built in 1894, followed by Majestic Park (1908) and Fogel Field (1912). 134 members of the Baseball Hall of Fame are documented to have trained or played, in Hot Springs.

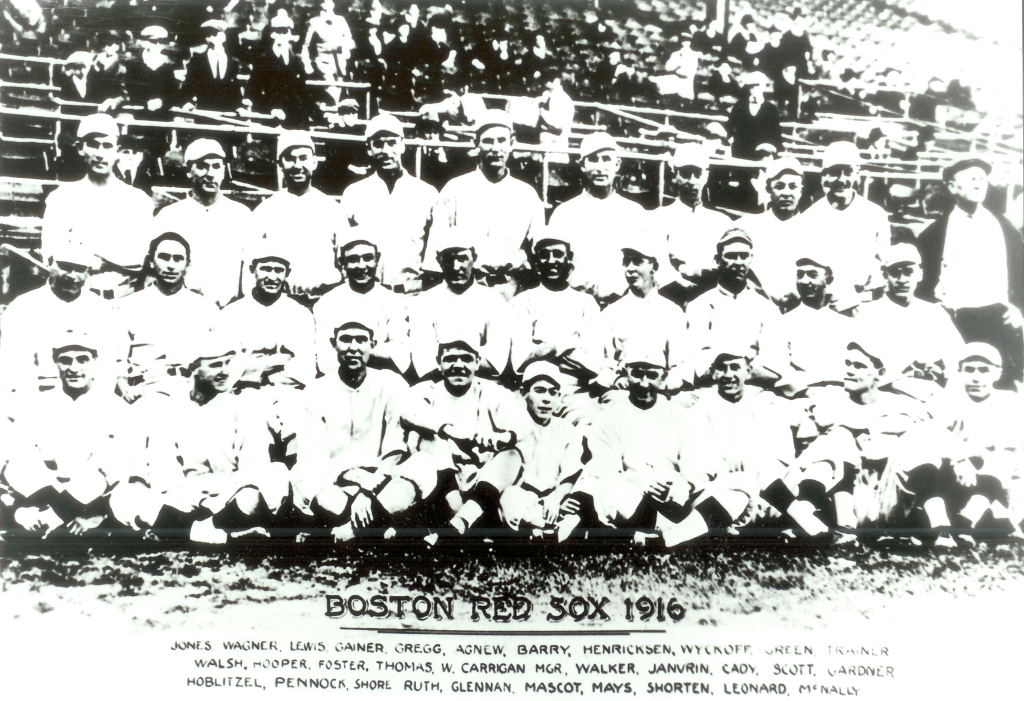
World Series Champion Red Sox 1916, Babe Ruth in front row, middle

== History of original Majestic Field ==
In 1908, the Detroit Tigers created a practice baseball field at the site. In 1909, the stands for Majestic Park were built at the field by Boston Red Sox owner John I. Taylor, who signed a five-year lease on the property as a Spring Training location. Trolleys were routed to turn around in front of the park. The Majestic name came from the Majestic Hotel in Hot Springs. Two years later, Taylor would construct Fenway Park for the Red Sox. The Boston Red Sox (1909-1910, 1912–18), Cincinnati Reds (1910–1911), Brooklyn Dodgers (1910) and St. Louis Browns (AL) (1911) held Spring Training Camp at the original Majestic Park.

The Boston Red Sox were a dominant team, winning four World Series Championships in their time at Majestic Park (1912, 1915, 1916 and 1918). It was in 1918 spring training that the Red Sox first began to use Babe Ruth in the field, instead of exclusively at pitcher, to take advantage of his hitting.

On March 29, 1918, the St. Louis, Iron Mountain and Southern Railway, owners of the Majestic Park property cancelled the Red Sox lease for 1919 to utilize a portion of the ballpark area for railroad needs. In 1918, the original Majestic Park facility was demolished, leading to other fields on the property that had ties to the Major Leagues: Dean Field and Jaycee Park. The relocated field was renamed "Dean Field" in 1938 after Hall of Famer Dizzy Dean and his brother "Daffy" Paul Dean. Jaycee Park was built on the adjacent south side of the lot in 1947 to replace Ban Johnson Park, which was located across town.

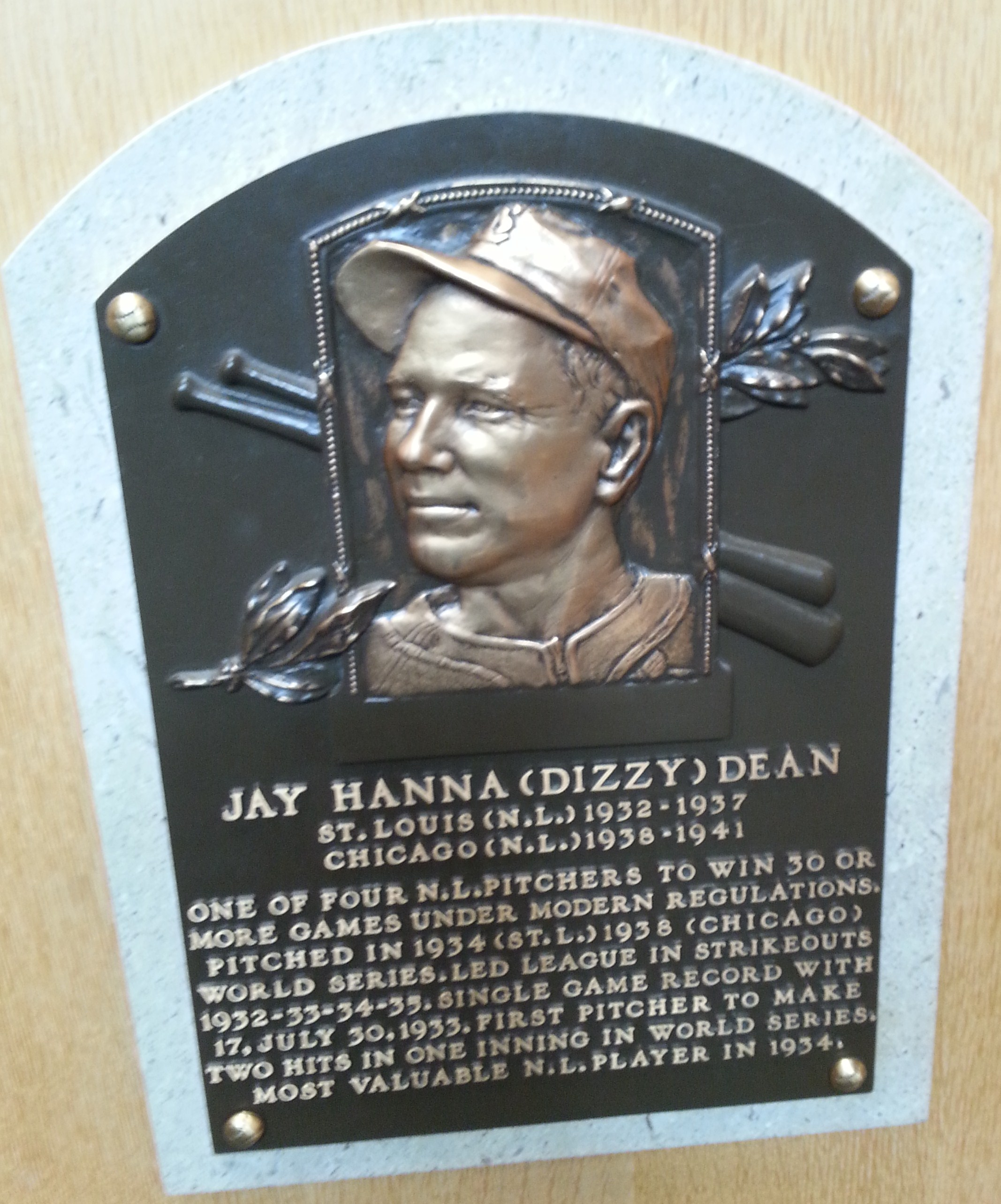
Dizzy Dean plaque HOF. "Dean Field" was named for Dean and his brother Paul "Daffy" Dean

When Dean Field (1935–1947) and Jaycee Park (1947–2019) evolved, they hosted the Rogers Hornsby Baseball College, the George Barr Umpire School, the Chicago White Sox (1949–1952) Minor League Spring Training and the Hot Springs Bathers as tenants.

The minor league Bathers (1947–1955) were a Cotton States League team that was an affiliate of the Chicago White Sox from 1947 to 1951, St. Louis Cardinals in 1954 and the Kansas City Athletics in 1955. Paul Dean Managed the 1954 team.

=== Baseball Schools ===
The Roy Doan Baseball School operated from 1934 to 1938, attracting hundreds of students and utilized Dean Field and other locations throughout Hot Springs. In 1939, Hall of Fame player and manager Rogers Hornsby, a former instructor with Roy Doan, started his own Rogers Hornsby Baseball College. Hornsby's six-week event ran until 1952, annually attracting 100-200 prospective professionals and numerous major league scouts. Cy Young, Jimmie Foxx, Tris Speaker and Schoolboy Rowe were among the instructors. The George Barr Umpire School, the first ever training school for aspiring umpires, operated in Hot Springs through 1940, being held in conjunction with the baseball schools.

=== Babe Ruth ===
Babe Ruth played at Majestic Park for six spring training seasons. In 1914, the lefty pitcher first faced Major League players as a young minor leaguer. Ruth would make the Red Sox' major league roster in 1915 and establish himself as a star pitcher. In 1918, during Spring Training, Ruth played first base as an emergency measure in a game against Brooklyn at Whittington Field (later called Ban Johnson Park). The game helped change baseball history. Ruth hit two home runs that day and the second was a reported 573-foot home run that landed in the Arkansas Alligator Farm across the street. As a result, the Red Sox began to use Ruth as both a pitcher and a hitter. With Ruth regularly in the 1918 lineup, he led the American League with 11 home runs. He also pitched to a 13–7 record and the Red Sox won the World Series. Sold to the New York Yankees in 1920, Ruth went on to total 714 Home Runs, a record that stood until broken by Hank Aaron.

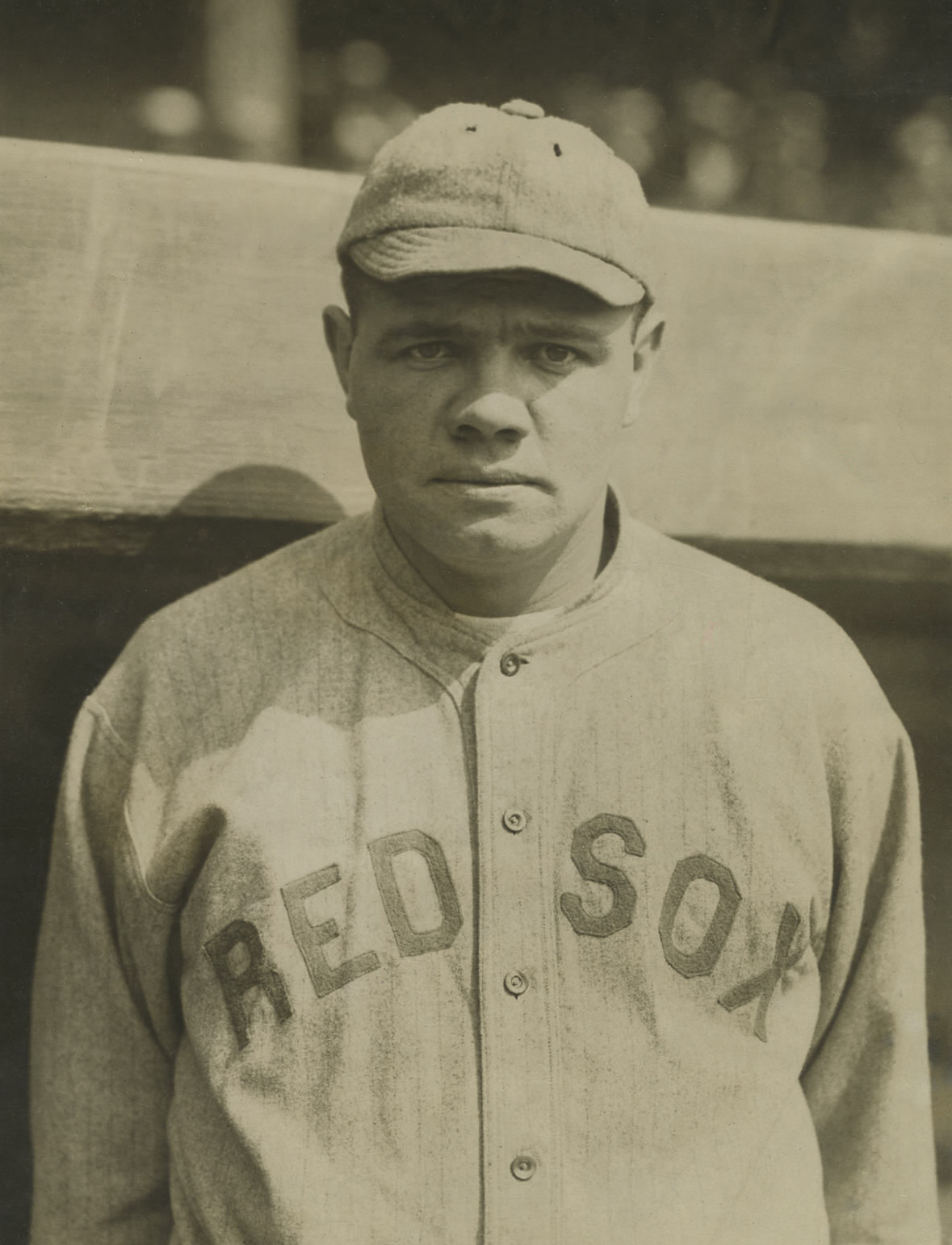
Babe Ruth, 1916

=== Jackie Robinson ===
On October 22, 1953, Jackie Robinson played in an exhibition game at Jaycee Park. Having broken Major League Baseball's color barrier in 1947, Robinson and the some other Major League players (including his Dodgers teammate Gil Hodges) toured, calling themselves Jackie Robinson's All-Stars. Robinson's squad played the Negro American League All–Stars that day, losing 14–9. Today, there is a plaque at the site as part of the "Hot Springs Baseball Historic Trail" honoring the event.

=== Hank Aaron: "Negro League World Series" ===
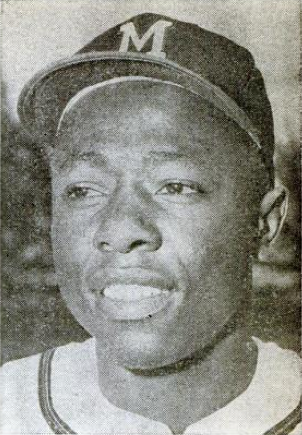
Hank Aaron, Milwaukee Braves, 1960

In 1952, as referenced in a plaque at the site, 18-year old shortstop Hank Aaron played for the Negro league Indianapolis Clowns against the Birmingham Black Barons at Jaycee Park for the Negro American League (NAL) championship. The championship was eventually won by the Clowns, with Aaron hitting 5 Home runs and batting over .400. Discovered by the Clowns while playing for a semi-pro team (Mobile Black Bears) in a game against them, they signed Aaron in April, 1951. After his performance in the NAL championship, Aaron signed with the Boston Braves. Hank Aaron would eventually become baseball's all-time Home Run leader, with 755 career Home Runs, breaking Babe Ruth's record of 714 on April 8, 1974.

== Media ==
The First Boys of Spring is a 2015 documentary on the history of Hot Springs Spring Training. The film features Majestic Park items. Produced by Arkansas filmmaker Larry Foley, it is narrated by Hot Springs area native, actor Billy Bob Thornton. The Foley documentary was aired nationally on the MLB Network beginning in February, 2016.

== Majestic Park today ==
In 1953, the Hot Springs Boys and Girls Club built and opened a youth facility on the parcel at 105 West Belding Street, where the building remains today. In 2018, Champion Christian College took possession of the youth facility building. Along with Champions, National Park College uses Majestic Park as their home field as well.

In September 2019, the City of Hot Springs successfully passed a publicly voted bond issue to secure 8.5 million dollars for a total renovation of the Majestic Park site. The resulting renovation project was completed in the spring of 2021. In addition to the bond monies, a $500,000 grant was also received from the Oaklawn Foundation to initiate the renovation. The new Majestic Park site contains five baseball fields, as well as grandstands, concession areas, restrooms, warm-up areas, batting cages and playground areas.

On August 27, 2021, Baseball Hall of Fame members Andre Dawson and Goose Gossage, along with Jim Edmonds and Al Hrabosky were in attendance for "Baseball Weekend" ceremonies at Majestic Park.

As part of the Hot Springs Baseball Historic Trail, four separate plaques are erected at the site: Majestic Field, Hank Aaron, Jackie Robinson and Rogers Hornsby.

The Majestic Field plaque reads:

Majestic Field Built in 1909 as the Boston Red Sox training center, this field was also used by the Cincinnati Reds and Brooklyn Dodgers. In March 1918, during batting practice, Babe Ruth hit many home runs over the distant center field fence, predicting his change from pitcher to slugging outfielder. Cy Young, Tris Speaker, Smoky Joe Wood and many others also trained here.

The Hank Aaron plaque reads:

At this field on October 1, 1952, 18-year old Hank Aaron and the Indianapolis Clowns played in one of 12 games of the Negro League World Series against the Birmingham Black Barons. During this series, Aaron he batted .402 and slugged five home runs leading his team to the championship. "Hammerin' Hank" eventually broke Babe Ruth's home run record by recording 755 Major League home runs.

The Jackie Robinson plaque says the following:

One of the most important events in Hot Springs history occurred where you are standing. On October 22, 1953, the legendary Jackie Robinson, played an exhibition game here at Jaycee field with Gil Hodges, Luke Easter and other fellow Big Leaguers. He is recognized as the man who broke the color barrier in Major League baseball.

The Rogers Hornsby plaque at the site reads:

At the conclusion of his historic Hall of Fame career, Rogers "The Rajah" Hornsby returned to Hot Springs to oversee the nationally-recognized baseball school. Founded here in 1933 by Ray Doan, the school prospered for years, training young players from around the country. Instructors included George Sisler, Grover Cleveland Alexander and Dizzy Dean.
