= Arkansas Alligator Farm and Petting Zoo =

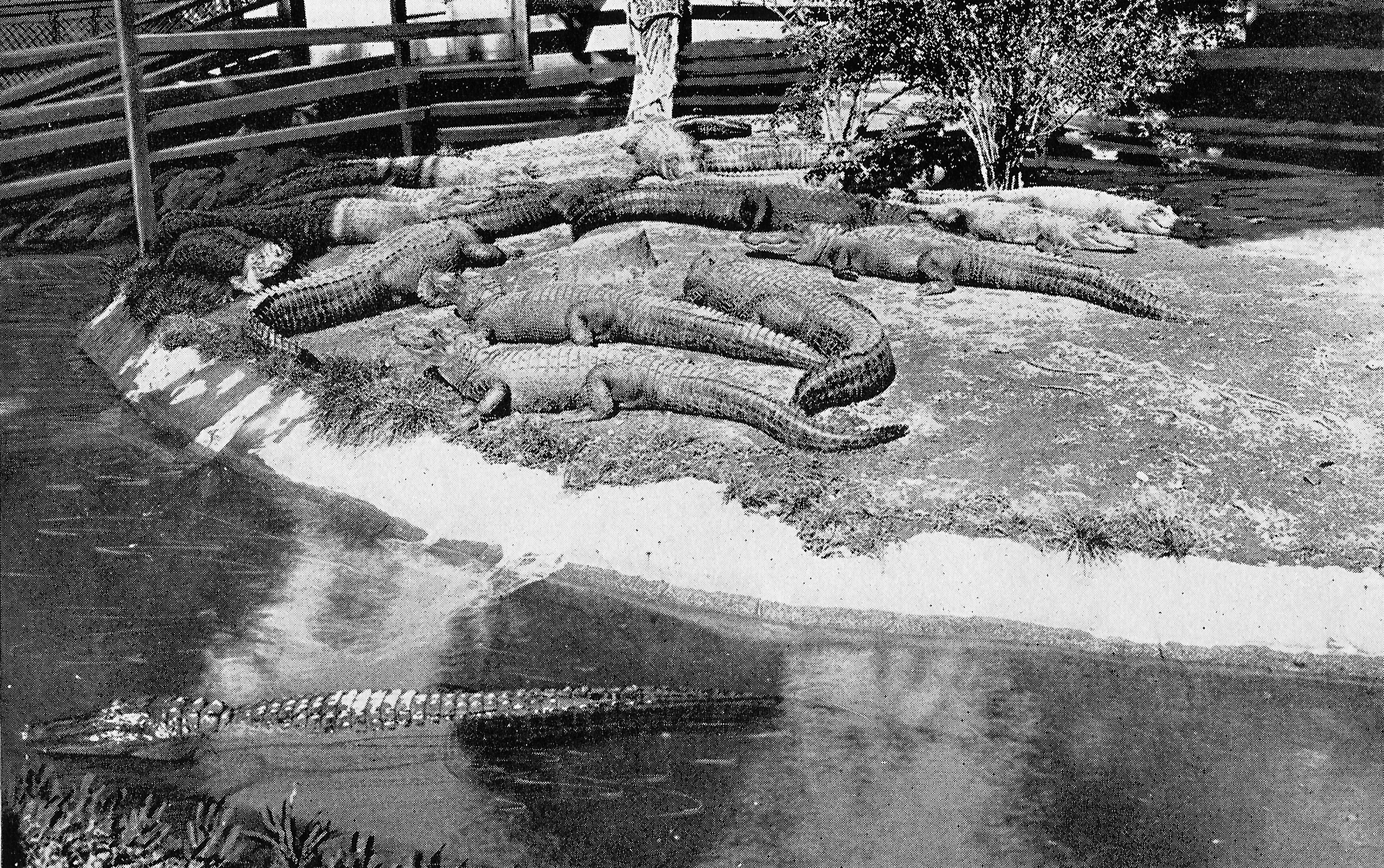
- Alligator farm circa 1902
- Interactive map of Arkansas Alligator Farm and Petting Zoo
- 34°30′54″N 93°04′24″W
- Date opened: 1902
- Location: Hot Springs, Arkansas, United States
- No. of animals: <400
- No. of species: <20
- Public transit: Intracity Transit
- Website: www.alligatorfarmzoo.com

The Arkansas Alligator Farm and Petting Zoo is a privately owned zoo located on Whittington Avenue in Hot Springs, Arkansas.

The farm houses but does not raise alligators and has done so since it was founded in 1902. The farm includes a small museum with a collection of mounted alligators, a souvenir shop but there’s no snack bar. It includes the mummified carcass purporting to be a "Merman", similar to ones held in Ripley's Believe It or Not! museums.

The main alligator pit contains a small headstone, a memorial to somebody's fox terrier that was killed by alligators on that spot in 1906.

== History ==
H. L. Campbell founded the farm in 1902 because he thought the Hot Springs area needed a tourist attraction in addition to the thermal baths. He sold it to D. S. Older some time before 1929. During this time it was called the "Hot Springs Gator Farm", and had up to 1500 alligators and included a small museum.

The farm was sold to Jack Bridges, Sr. and his wife in 1945, and the name was changed to the Arkansas Alligator Farm. The Bridges added a gift shop, as well as other animals such as monkeys, raccoons, and logger-head turtles. Jack Bridges Jr. and his wife Sue purchased the zoo in 1965, and added more animals, as well as a petting zoo and a small museum.

== Exhibits ==
In addition to about 200 alligators, the zoo now includes cougars, turkeys, chickens, wild boars, turtles, bobcats, and ring-tailed lemurs.

The farm includes a petting zoo with goats, emus, llamas, white-tailed deer, pigs, baby alligators, and other animals. Visitors can get close to the animals and feed them. The alligator feeding show also includes educational material about the animals.

== Business ==
The farm started out as a business to raise alligators for their hides and to sell live alligators to parks and zoos. The farm was one of the first to use incubators to help raise the eggs into hatchlings. In its early days, visitors were able to purchase live baby alligators from the farm.

== Baseball history and the alligator farm ==
In 1918, the Alligator Farm became part of Babe Ruth baseball lore, due to its location directly across from Whittington Park, then the Spring Training home of the Pittsburgh Pirates. Ruth, playing in a 1918 spring training game for the Boston Red Sox on St. Patrick's Day, hit a home run that traveled an astonishing 573 feet (175 m), over Whittington Avenue that landed in the second pond at the alligator farm. At the time, Ruth was a star pitcher. However, he soon became a legendary hitter, in part due to his home run that day. A prominent marker inside the Alligator Farm recognizes the event.

Also on the property of the Alligator Farm today, is the field that was once Fogel Field. This field is adjacent to the parking lot and is used for overflow parking. Fogel Field was constructed by Hot Springs in 1912 as a spring training site for Major League Baseball teams. Named for Horace Fogel, President of the Philadelphia Phillies, Fogel Field hosted the Phillies (1912) and the Pittsburgh Pirates (1921–1923, 1926). Later, the Kansas City Monarchs (1928), Homestead Grays (1930–1931) and Pittsburgh Crawfords (1932–1935) of the Negro leagues used Fogel Field as their spring training site.

Outside the Alligator Farm, as part of the Hot Springs Historic Baseball Trail are markers for Babe Ruth and Fogel Field.

The Ruth marker reads:

Ruth trained here nine times and became a very familiar face around Hot Springs. He hiked the mountains, took the baths, played golf, patronized the casinos, and visited the racetrack. On March 17, 1918 (St. Patrick's Day), he launched a mammoth home run from Whittington Park that landed on the fly, inside the Arkansas Alligator Farm. It has been measured at 573 feet, — baseball’s first 500-foot-plus drive.

The Fogel Field plaque reads:

This field, also known as Fordyce Field, was constructed in 1912 by the Hot Springs Park Company to meet the demand of over 250 major leaguers training in Hot Springs. The Philadelphia Phillies' owner Horace Fogel, leased the field for his team. The Phillies' roster included pitching legend Grover Cleveland Alexander and slugging outfielders Gavvy Cravath and Sherwood Magee. The training ground was also later used by the Pittsburgh Pirates.

== Media ==
The zoo was featured on ABC News and the TV shows Untamed and Uncut, and Most Shocking when an animal handler was attacked by an alligator.

The Babe Ruth 573-foot home run and the Alligator Farm are featured in The First Boys of Spring (2015), a documentary focusing on the historical importance of Hot Springs spring training baseball. The documentary is narrated by Arkansas native, actor Billy Bob Thornton and produced by Larry Foley. The documentary began airing nationally on the MLB Network in February 2016.
