= Bill McKinley =

American baseball umpire (1910–1980)

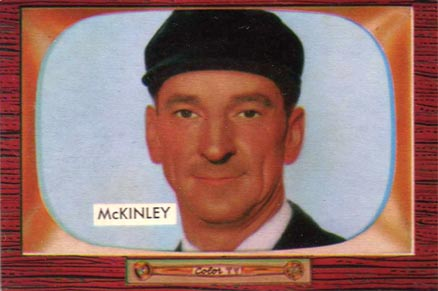
- Born: William Francis McKinley; May 13, 1910; Kinsman, Ohio, US
- Died: August 1, 1980 (aged 70); Mount Pleasant, Pennsylvania, US
- Occupation: Umpire
- Years active: 1946–1965
- Employer: American League

William Francis McKinley (May 13, 1910 - August 1, 1980) was an American professional baseball umpire who worked in the American League from 1946 to 1965. McKinley umpired 2,977 major league games in his 20-year career. He umpired in four World Series and three All-Star Games. McKinley was the first graduate of an umpire training school to make it to the major leagues.

== Career ==
McKinley was initially a student in the George Barr Umpire School held at Whittington Park in Hot Springs, Arkansas and operated by major league umpire George Barr.

Before training as an umpire, McKinley had worked as a meat cutter and was a catcher in semipro baseball. He tried out twice at major league camps and entered umpiring when the tryouts were unsuccessful. His umpiring career began in 1939 in the Ohio State League, where he was paid $100 per month and had to cover his own expenses. He also worked in the North Carolina State League, Michigan State League and American Association.

He served in the military between 1943 and 1945.

Upon his promotion to Major League Baseball in 1946, McKinley became the very first MLB umpire to ever receive formal training at an umpire school.

McKinley appeared in the World Series in 1950, 1952, 1957 and 1964. He worked the All-Star Game in 1953, 1958 and 1962.

In a 1955 game, McKinley ejected outfielder Irv Noren, who became the first player on the New York Yankees to be suspended since 1942. Noren was arguing a call from McKinley on the basepaths when he crowded the umpire. McKinley placed his mask in front of his face during the argument, and the outfielder later said that he was struck in the face with the mask. McKinley said that he was simply shielding his face from Noren's spittle.

McKinley made a controversial ruling in his final World Series. With Bob Gibson on the mound for the St. Louis Cardinals in the sixth inning of the second game in the 1964 World Series, McKinley ruled a Gibson pitch hit Joe Pepitone of the New York Yankees. The Cardinals protested the pitch first struck Pepitone's bat. Later in the inning, the Yankees took the lead and ultimately won the game by a score of 8–3. However, the Cardinals won the World Series in seven games.

In 1965, a mandatory retirement rule forced McKinley to end his umpiring career at the age of 55.

== Personal life ==
In 1960, two men from Washington, DC, attempted to extort money from McKinley and fellow umpire Ed Runge using a photo of the two umpires with two women in a motel room. The two Washington men and one of the women (a young dancer) were brought before a magistrate on extortion-related charges. In September of that season, at their own requests, Runge and McKinley were granted leaves of absence for the remainder of the season.

== Death ==
McKinley died on August 1, 1980, in Mount Pleasant, Pennsylvania.

== See also ==
- List of Major League Baseball umpires (disambiguation)
