= Jaycee Park (Hot Springs, Arkansas) =

Ballpark in Hot Springs, Arkansas, U.S.

Coordinates: 34°29′35″N 93°03′00″W

Jaycee Park, also known as Bathers Field, is a ballpark located in Hot Springs, Arkansas, United States. Built in 1946 and 1947, it opened on May 1, 1947, with a seating capacity of 4,000. The site was previously called Majestic Park and was the site of Spring Training for the Detroit Tigers, Boston Red Sox, Pittsburgh Pirates and Brooklyn Dodgers. From 1947 to 1955, it served as the home field for the Hot Springs Bathers, a minor league baseball team that played in the Cotton States League. From 1948 to 1951, it served as a Spring Training site for the Chicago White Sox organization. In 1949, its capacity was down to 2,600, and in 2008 it was down to 1,100.

After operating as a Boys and Girls Club with ball fields from 1953 to 2016, the site reopened on February 4, 2022, as Majestic Park Baseball Complex, owned and operated by the Hot Springs Advertising & Promotions Commission.
