= Scotty Robb =

American baseball umpire (1908-1969)

- Born: Douglas Walker Robb; September 23, 1908; Hoffmanville, Maryland, U.S.
- Died: April 10, 1969 (aged 60); Montclair, New Jersey, U.S.
- Education: George Barr Umpire School
- Occupation: Major League Umpire
- Years active: 1947–53
- Employer(s): National League, American League
- Known for: Major League Baseball Umpire
- Spouse: Alta Halliwell
- Children: Louise Robb, Margaret Robb

Douglas Walker "Scotty" Robb (September 23, 1908 – April 10, 1969) was an American professional baseball umpire who worked in the National League from 1947 to 1952, and the American League in 1952 and 1953.

In 1936, Robb was initially a student in the George Barr Umpire School held at Whittington Park in Hot Springs, Arkansas and operated by Major League Umpire George Barr.

On August 29, 1947, Robb joined the National League. Robb was an umpire in the 1950 and 1951 Major League Baseball All-Star Games. In his career, he umpired 869 Major League games. He was the home plate umpire for Virgil Trucks no-hitter on August 25, 1952.

In 1952, Robb was fined and suspended by National League President Warren Giles for an April 22 incident with player Solly Hemus. Robb paid the fine then resigned. Two days later he was offered a job by American League President Will Harridge, which he accepted. Robb, therefore, became one of the few umpires to work in both leagues. On June 28, 1953, Robb retired to work in his printing business.

== See also ==
- List of Major League Baseball umpires (disambiguation)
