= Hot Springs Bathers =

- 1887–1955; (1887, 1894, 1897–1898, 1906, 1908–1909, 1938–1941, 1947–1955); Hot Springs, Arkansas

Minor league affiliations
- Previous classes: Class C (1938–1941, 1947–1955); Class D (1906, 1908–1909)
- League: Cotton States League (1938–1941, 1947–1955)
- Previous leagues: Arkansas State League (1906, 1908–1909); Southwestern League (1898); Arkansas State League (1894, 1897); Southwestern League (1887)

Major league affiliations
- Previous teams: Kansas City Athletics (1955); St. Louis Cardinals (1954); Chicago White Sox (1947–1951); Detroit Tigers (1939–1940); Chicago Cubs (1938)

Minor league titles
- League titles: 1941, 1948, 1950

Team data
- Previous names: Hot Springs Bathers (1938–1941, 1947–1955); Hot Springs Vaporites (1908–1909); Hot Springs Vapors (1906); Hot Springs (1898); Hot Springs Bathers (1894, 1897); Hot Springs Blues (1887)
- Previous parks: Bathers Field (1947–1955); Ban Johnson Park (1938–1941)

The Hot Springs Bathers were a Cotton States League baseball team based in Hot Springs, Arkansas, United States, that played from 1938 to 1941 and from 1947 to 1955. In 1938, they were affiliated with the Chicago Cubs. In 1939 and 1940, they were affiliated with the Detroit Tigers. From 1948 to 1951, they were affiliated with the Chicago White Sox. They were affiliated with the St. Louis Cardinals in 1954 and the Kansas City Athletics in 1955. From 1938 to 1941, they played at Whittington Park / Ban Johnson Park, and from 1947 to 1955 they played at Bathers Field / Jaycee Park / Majestic Park.

In 1953, the Cotton States League attempted to evict the Bathers from the league because they signed and planned to play two African-American baseball players, brothers Jim and Leander Tugerson. The eviction was not permanent, however the brothers were never able to play in any regular season games for the team.

== League championships ==
They won their first championship in 1941 under manager Mike Powers. Under Joe Holden and George Sobek, they won again in 1948. In 1950, they won their final championship under John Antonelli.

== Notable alumni ==
- Paul Dean (1954, manager)
- Bill Fischer (1949)
- Pete Fox (1949) MLB All-Star
- Shanty Hogan (1952, manager)
- Joe Kuhel (1947)
- Mickey O'Neil (1955, manager)
- Hippo Vaughn (1908)
