= Wyatt (surname) =

Wyatt is a patronymic surname, derived from the Norman surname Guyot, derived from "widu", Proto-Germanic for "wood".

== Notable people with the surname "Wyatt" include ==
=== A ===
- Aaron Wyatt, Australian musician
- Addie L. Wyatt (1924–2012), American labor leader
- Adrian Wyatt, British physicist
- Alan Wyatt (1935–2024), Australian cricketer
- Alex Wyatt (born 1990), English cricketer
- Alex Wyatt (cricketer, born 1976) (born 1976), Australian cricketer
- Alvin Wyatt (born 1947), American football player
- Andrew Wyatt, American musician
- Ann Wyatt (1742–1811), English philanthropist
- Annie Forsyth Wyatt (1885–1961), Australian conservationist
- Antwuan Wyatt (born 1975), American football player
- Arthur Wyatt (disambiguation), multiple people
- Avis Wyatt (born 1984), American basketball player

=== B ===
- B. Wyatt, American actor
- Barbara Wyatt (1930–2012), British figure skater
- Benjamin Wyatt (disambiguation), multiple people
- Bill Wyatt (born 1938), Australian basketball player
- Bob Wyatt (1901–1995), English cricketer
- Bobby Wyatt (born 1992), American golfer
- Bowden Wyatt (1917–1969), American football player
- Bray Wyatt (1987–2023), ring name of American professional wrestler Windham Rotunda

=== C ===
- Caleb Wyatt (born 1976), American stunt performer
- Candice Wyatt (born 1982), Australian journalist
- Carol Wyatt (born 1946), British artist
- Caroline Wyatt (born 1967), British journalist
- Cedric Wyatt (1940–2014), Australian public servant
- Charles Wyatt (disambiguation), multiple people
- Chris Wyatt (disambiguation), multiple people
- Clarrie Wyatt (1904–1986), Australian rules footballer
- Colin Wyatt (illustrator) (born 1939), British illustrator
- Colin Wyatt (musician), American drummer

=== D ===
- Danni Wyatt (born 1991), English cricketer
- Dave Wyatt (1871–1950), American baseball player
- David Wyatt (disambiguation), multiple people
- Derek Wyatt (born 1949), British politician
- Derrick Wyatt (born 1948), English legal scholar
- Devonte Wyatt (born 1998), American football player
- Dorothy Wyatt (1925–2011), Canadian politician
- Doug Wyatt (born 1946), American football player

=== E ===
- Ed Wyatt (born 1960), Australian broadcaster
- Edith Franklin Wyatt (1873–1958), American writer
- Eliza Wyatt, American playwright

=== F ===
- Finnlay Wyatt (born 1995), English footballer
- F. Mark Wyatt (1920–2006), American intelligence officer
- Francis Wyatt (1588–1644), English colonial administrator
- Francis Wyatt (cricketer) (1882–1971), English cricketer
- Frank Wyatt (1852–1926), English actor
- Frank Wyatt (sport shooter) (born 1946), British sport shooter

=== G ===
- Gail E. Wyatt (born 1944), American psychologist
- Gareth Wyatt (born 1977), Welsh rugby union footballer
- George Wyatt (disambiguation), multiple people
- Gerald Wyatt (1933–2001), English cricketer
- Gerard R. Wyatt (1925–2019), American-Canadian biochemist
- Gertrud L. Wyatt (1903–1993), Austrian-American psychologist
- Greg Wyatt, American sculptor

=== H ===
- Halifax Wyatt (1829–1909), English cricketer
- Harold Wyatt (1880–1949), English cricketer
- Harry M. Wyatt III (born 1949), American lieutenant general
- Henry Wyatt (disambiguation), multiple people
- Honor Wyatt (1910–1998), English journalist
- Hugh Wyatt (born 1933), English politician

=== I ===
- Inzer Bass Wyatt (1907–1990), American judge
- Ivan Wyatt (1924–2009), New Zealand cricketer

=== J ===
- James Wyatt (disambiguation), multiple people
- Jane Wyatt (1910–2006), American actress
- J. Edward Wyatt (1860–1932), Canadian politician
- Jennifer Wyatt (born 1965), Canadian golfer
- Jessee Wyatt (born 1996), Australian Paralympic athlete
- Jo Wyatt, English actress
- Joe Wyatt (1900–1970), American baseball player
- Joe B. Wyatt (born 1936), American academic administrator
- John Wyatt (disambiguation), multiple people
- Jon Wyatt (born 1973), British field hockey player
- Jonathan Wyatt (born 1972), New Zealand runner
- Joseph Wyatt (disambiguation), multiple people
- Julian Wyatt (born 1963), English cricketer
- Justin Wyatt (born 1984), American football player

=== K ===
- Kandi Wyatt (born 1991), Canadian boxer
- Keith Wyatt, American guitarist
- Keke Wyatt (born 1982), American singer
- Ken Wyatt (born 1952), Australian politician
- Kervin Wyatt (born 1957), American football player
- Kevin Wyatt (born 1964), American football player
- Khalif Wyatt (born 1991), American basketball player
- Kimberly Wyatt (born 1982), American singer
- Kirsten Wyatt (born 1975), American actress

=== L ===
- Lee Wyatt (1890–1960), justice of the Supreme Court of Georgia
- Len Wyatt (1919–2015), New Zealand cricketer
- Lewis Wyatt (1777–1853), British architect
- Lisa K. Wyatt, American actress
- Logan Wyatt (born 1997), American baseball player
- Lucius R. Wyatt (born 1938), American trumpeter
- Lucy R. Wyatt, British mathematician
- Lynn Wyatt (born 1935), American socialite

=== M ===
- Marc Wyatt (born 1977), Welsh lawn bowler
- Marcus Wyatt (disambiguation), multiple people
- Mark Wyatt (disambiguation), multiple people
- Mary Wyatt (1789–1871), British botanist
- Matthew Wyatt (disambiguation), multiple people
- Meyne Wyatt (born 1989), Australian actor

=== N ===
- Naomi Wyatt, American politician
- Neale Wyatt (born 1981), Australian rugby league footballer

=== O ===
- Oscar Wyatt (1924–2025), American businessman

=== P ===
- Paul Wyatt (1907–1970), American swimmer
- Paul Wyatt (footballer) (born 1989), English footballer
- Petronella Wyatt (born 1968), British journalist
- Philip Wyatt (1785–1835), English architect
- Philip J. Wyatt, American scientist

=== R ===
- Rachel Wyatt (1929–2024), English-Canadian dramatist
- Ralph Wyatt (1917–1990), American baseball player
- Ray Wyatt, American politician
- Reg Wyatt (1932–2007), English footballer
- Reggie Wyatt (born 1990), American hurdler
- Richard Wyatt (disambiguation), multiple people
- Robert Wyatt (disambiguation), multiple people
- Ron Wyatt (1933–1999), American archaeologist
- Rupert Wyatt (born 1972), English screenwriter
- Russ Wyatt, Canadian politician
- Ryan Wyatt (born 1986), American gaming executive

=== S ===
- Sally Wyatt (born 1959), Canadian researcher
- Samuel Wyatt (1737–1807), British architect
- Sarah Wyatt (born 1958), American biologist
- Scott Wyatt (disambiguation), multiple people
- Sharon Wyatt (born 1953), American actress
- Stan Wyatt (1894–1964), Australian politician
- Stephen Wyatt (born 1948), British writer
- Stephen Wyatt (weightlifter) (born 1950), Australian weightlifter
- Steve Wyatt (born 1971), English cricketer

=== T ===
- Terry Wyatt (born 1957), English professor
- Tessa Wyatt (born 1948), British actress
- Thomas Wyatt (disambiguation), multiple people
- Tom Wyatt (1946–2025), Australian horticulturalist
- Tom Wyatt (rugby union) (born 1999), English rugby union footballer
- Trevor Wyatt, British record producer
- Tristram Wyatt (born 1956), British biologist

=== V ===
- Victoria Wyatt (born 1956), American ethnographer

=== W ===
- Walter Wyatt (1893–1978), American lawyer
- Wendell Wyatt (1917–2009), American politician
- Will Wyatt (born 1942), British television producer
- William Wyatt (disambiguation), multiple people
- Willie Wyatt (born 1967), American football player
- Wilson W. Wyatt (1905–1996), American politician
- Woodrow Wyatt (1918–1997), British politician

=== Z ===
- Zachary Wyatt (born 1984), American politician

== Fictional characters ==
- Amy Wyatt, a character on the soap opera Emmerdale
- Leo Wyatt, a character on the television series Charmed
- Ben Wyatt, a character on the television series Parks and Recreation

== See also ==
- Wyatt family, family of English architects
- Wyatt (given name), a page for people with the given name "Wyatt"
- Wyatt (disambiguation), a disambiguation page for "Wyatt"
