= Jim Webber =

Australian politician (1940–2024)

Mayor of the City of Rockhampton
- In office 1982–1991
- Preceded by: Rex Pilbeam
- Succeeded by: Lea Taylor

Personal details
- Born: 28 August 1940 Leonora, Western Australia, Australia
- Died: 4 November 2024 (aged 84)
- Party: Australian Labor Party

James Richard Webber (28 August 1940 – 4 November 2024) was an Australian politician.

Webber is perhaps best known for ending Rex Pilbeam's record 30-year reign as the mayor of the Queensland city of Rockhampton.

He was also known for helping coordinate an unorthodox rescue mission in 1986 to prevent two male chimpanzees from being euthanised.

== Life and career ==
=== Early life ===
Webber was born on 28 August 1940 in Leonora, Western Australia, and relocated to Queensland with his family as a young boy.

At the age of 17, Webber moved north to Mackay where he worked at a Goodyear outlet retreading tyres. Webber claimed he was sacked from the job after losing his temper at his boss for hitting him with a whip, which Webber alleged he did to all employees "jokingly".

Despite already purchasing a block of land to build a house in Mackay, Webber relocated to Rockhampton with his fiancee in 1961 in what was meant to be a three-month stay.

However, after Webber took up a position with Hardy Rubber, he married Stella Gray in 1962, after which they settled in Rockhampton and raised a family of four children.

After working as a salesman at a local Chandler's store, Webber established his own local electrical goods retailer with his brother in 1968 called Rockhampton Electrical Centre, before the business became part of Retravision in 1970.

=== Political career ===
At the age of 29, Webber was elected as an alderman to Rockhampton City Council in 1970.

After defeating long serving mayor Rex Pilbeam for the mayoralty in 1982, Webber served three consecutive terms as mayor until 1991 when he was succeeded by Lea Taylor.

Webber remained on the council for an additional 11 years, serving as deputy mayor in Rockhampton City Council's final four years of existence before its amalgamation with three neighbouring local government areas in 2008 to become Rockhampton Regional Council.

Until amalgamation, Webber remained heavily involved in council, frequently debating local issues and council decisions.

Through his time at Rockhampton City Council, Webber is credited with overseeing the development of Kershaw Gardens, the Rockhampton Music Bowl and for being instrumental in having Rockhampton City Council acquire the Rockhampton Airport.

Webber also led Rockhampton through the 1991 floods caused by Cyclone Joy, which ultimately became the third highest recorded flood in the city's history.

Along with Tom Wyatt, Webber is also credited with devising a plan to save two male chimpanzees called Cassius and Octavius from being euthanised at Tweed Heads in 1986, circumventing the Queensland and New South Wales state government's refusal to sign permits to allow the chimpanzees to cross the border.

Webber and Wyatt drove down to retrieve the chimpanzees, persuading a truck driver to assist them in transporting the sedated chimpazees back to Rockhampton, so they could be housed at the Rockhampton Zoo.

Webber and Wyatt reunited with Cassius at the Rockhampton Zoo a month before the chimp's 50th birthday in 2021. Recounting the rescue mission, Webber stated: "At about nine o'clock at night, we got in the car and went down to the coast to save them... I was a fast driver and Tom was so scared."

=== Health ===
Webber had a cancerous lymph node surgically removed from his bowel in 1998 and received chemotherapy treatment for six months.

In 2014, Webber was diagnosed with lymphoma on the brain and received chemotherapy treatment at Holy Spirit Northside Private Hospital in Brisbane.

=== Death ===
Webber died on 4 November 2024, at the age of 84.

After his death, Rockhampton mayor Tony Williams praised Webber as "someone who cared, led and delivered for Rockhampton in what was a critical time in the city's history". Former mayor Margaret Strelow and Member for Rockhampton Donna Kirkland also paid tribute to Webber.

Webber's funeral was held at the Cathedral of Praise in the Rockhampton suburb of Kawana on 8 November 2024 prior to his burial in the North Rockhampton Cemetery.

== Legacy ==
In 2019, the Reception Room at Rockhampton's City Hall which had recently been restored was named the "Jim Webber Reception Room" in Webber's honour. An official opening was held at City Hall on 10 April 2019.
