= Tom Wyatt =

Australian horticulturalist (1946–2025)

- Born: 1946
- Died: 1 January 2025 (aged 78)
- Occupation: Horticulturist
- Years active: 1974–2022
- Known for: Hosting Gardening Talkback on ABC Local Radio (1982–2022); curating of Rockhampton Botanic Gardens and Kershaw Gardens (1974–2008); being a councillor on Rockhampton and Livingstone councils (2012–2020)
- Notable work: All Your Gardening Questions Answered (1999), The ABC of Gardening (2006)

Thomas Allen Wyatt (1946 – 1 January 2025) was an Australian horticulturalist.

Wyatt was perhaps best known for his 40-year association with the Australian Broadcasting Corporation in Queensland for which he hosted a weekly program called Gardening Talkback on the ABC Local Radio network.

Wyatt is also notable for serving as the sixth curator of the Rockhampton Botanic Gardens and for designing Kershaw Gardens.

== Rockhampton City Council ==
=== Rockhampton Botanic Gardens ===
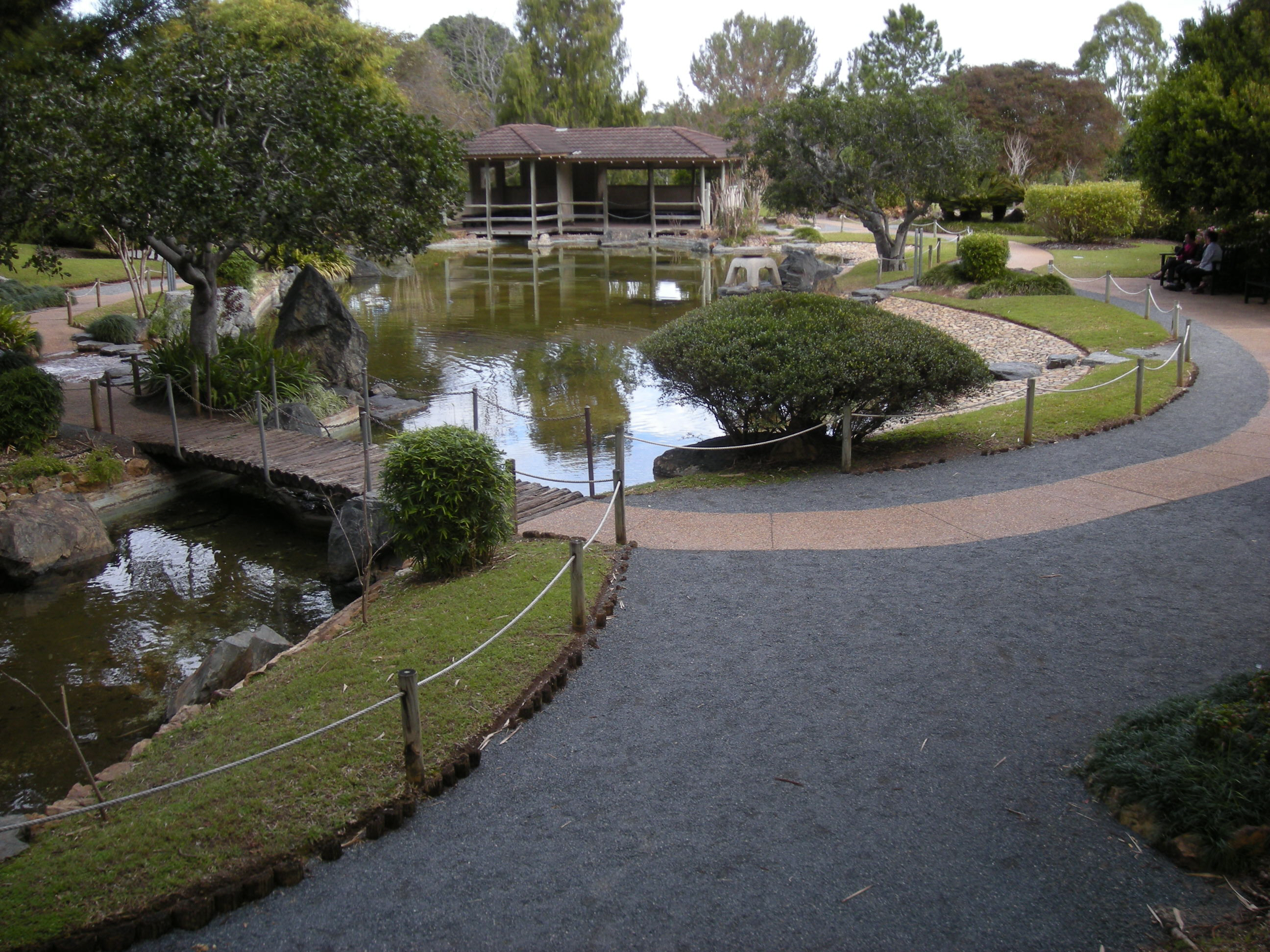
The Japanese garden at Rockhampton Botanic Gardens which was officially opened on 17 June 1982

Relocating to Rockhampton from Townsville in 1974 and holding a Certificate of Horticulture, Rockhampton City Council appointed Wyatt as the curator of the Rockhampton Botanic Gardens as well as the Director of Parks and Gardens in August 1974.

In 1976, Wyatt obtained additional palm species for the Botanic Gardens which were renowned for holding the largest collection of such species in the southern hemisphere. That same year, he investigated the possibility of establishing a tropical fruit arboretum to demonstrate the diversity of tropical fruit which could be grown in Central Queensland. The arboretum was completed in 1978.

A major project undertaken during his curatorship at the Botanic Gardens was the construction of a Kenzo Ogata-designed Japanese Garden which commenced in 1979 following Australia and Japan signing the Basic Treaty of Friendship and Cooperation in 1976. Constructed as part of the relationship forged with Rockhampton's Japanese sister city Ibusuki, it was officially opened by the ambassador of Japan to Australia Mizuo Kuroda on 17 June 1982. In exchange, Wyatt helped develop and plant an Australian garden in Ibusuki in 1983 which included constructing a slab hut with Australian timber.

In the early 1990s, Wyatt obtained seed material from Mexico and Zimbabwe which was planted in the lawn surrounding the Rockhampton War Memorial which is located within the Botanic Gardens.

Wyatt served as curator of the Botanic Gardens until 1998 when a restructure at Rockhampton City Council saw his services no longer required. However, he was asked to return to the role in 2001.

=== Chimpanzee rescue mission ===
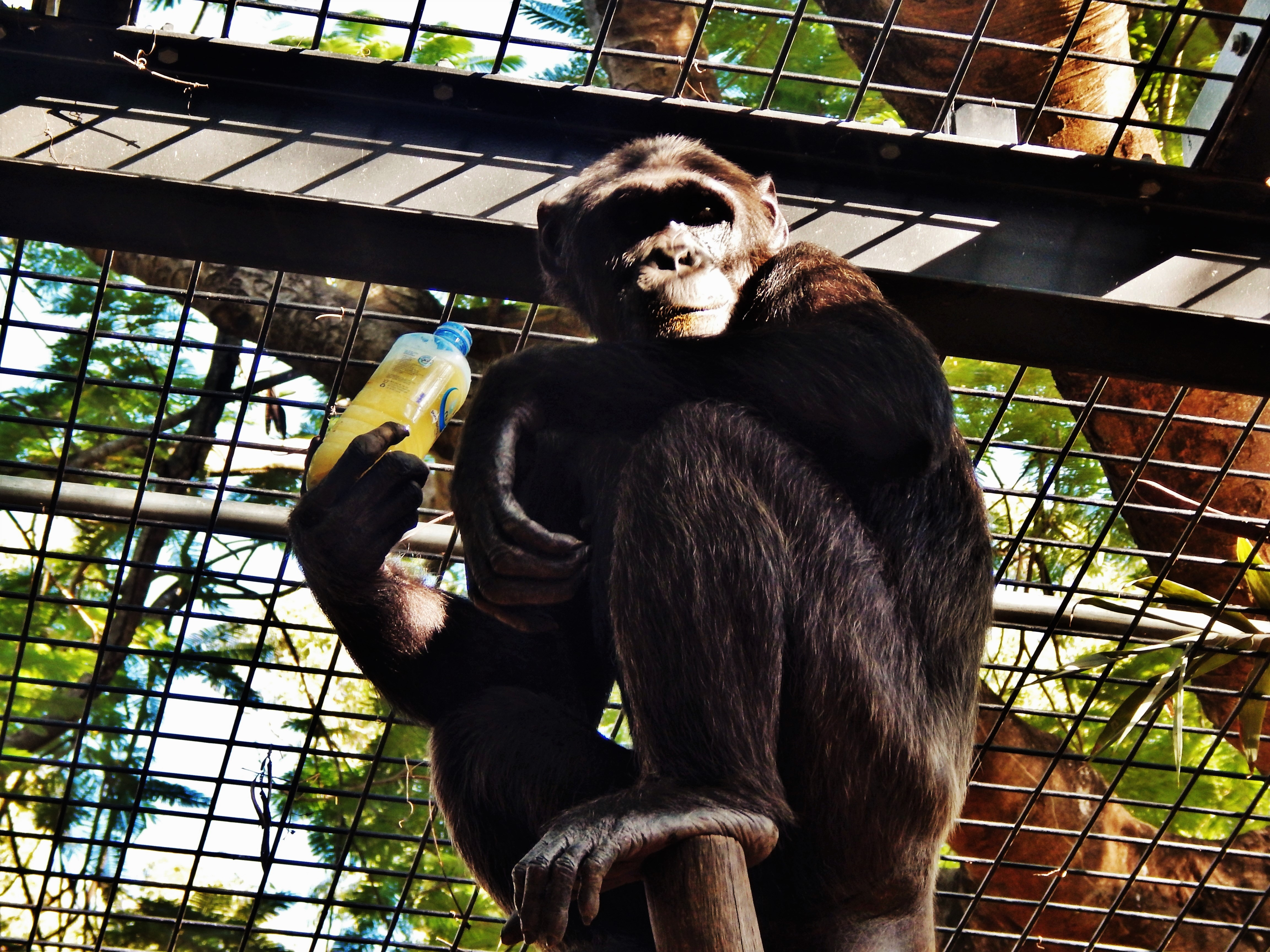
A chimpanzee at the Rockhampton Zoo, 2017

Wyatt is credited with helping save two chimpanzees called Cassius and Octavius from being euthanised in Tweed Heads in 1986 due to suspected tuberculosis.

After seeing a television news story about the plan to euthanise the chimpanzees after their mother had already been euthanised, despite being found not to have tuberculosis, Wyatt organised a secretive plan with Rockhampton mayor Jim Webber and councillor Jim Broad where they intended to rescue the chimpanzees and bring them back to the Rockhampton Zoo, which is located within the Botanic Gardens. This was despite the Queensland and New South Wales state governments refusing to sign permits allowing the chimpanzees across the border.

Wyatt and Webber drove through the night and collected the chimpanzees and were supplied with sedatives to keep the chimpanzees asleep for the journey back to Rockhampton. With the help of a semi-trailer truck driver who was also part of the plan, the chimpanzee cages were loaded onto his trailer which were concealed with tarp and were transported across the border and back to Rockhampton.

Wyatt and Webber's efforts in rescuing Casius (or "Cassie") and Octavius (or "Ockie") have been credited with indirectly establishing a successful breeding program at the zoo as well as making the zoo popular with visitors. Three baby chimpanzees have been successfully delivered at the zoo in 2018, 2020 and 2021, while there have also been two stillbirths.

While "Ockie" died in 2013 from a heart condition, Casius celebrated his 50th birthday in 2021 and continues to live at Rockhampton Zoo and is the alpha male of the pack.

=== Ibis culling controversy ===
Wyatt served as the curator of the Botanic Gardens until he accepted a redundancy package in 2008 following a public scandal surrounding his unauthorised culling of baby ibis birds, which first came to light when two men working on a Jobs Queensland horticulturist course alleged that council workers had secretly culled at least 87 birds at the Gardens.

At the time, Rockhampton City Council had just been merged with the three surrounding local government areas to form the new Rockhampton Regional Council. Outgoing chief executive officer Gary Stevensen said the alleged culling was being investigated by council and the Environmental Protection Agency with the matter being referred to incoming chief executive officer Alistair Dawson.

It was later reported that Wyatt had controversially culled the birds without proper authorisation in attempt to control the increasing population of Ibis and was subsequently suspended, issued with a $150 fine and officially reprimanded for his actions.

Dawson was subsequently criticised by a number of sitting councillors for appearing to demote Wyatt from his role as Director of Parks and into a special "projects officer" role following the scandal. Dawson denied that Wyatt was being demoted. In a joint statement released by himself and acting mayor Rose Swadling, they said Wyatt would be retaining his title as Director of Parks but would not return to his regular duties and instead be relegated to working in his new strategic position.

Wyatt ultimately accepted the redundancy package in October 2008.

In a scathing editorial, local newspaper The Morning Bulletin condemned Rockhampton Regional Council for not being forthright with the community regarding the ibis culling affair, after which the council publicly apologised.

Following the controversy, an official management program was introduced at the Rockhampton Botanic Gardens by a company called Ecosure in an effort to control its large Ibis population. This came after wildlife authorities recognised that the large Ibis population posed health risks to the community while also becoming a safety concern for the adjacent Rockhampton Airport due to the increasing likelihood of bird strikes on aircraft.

In December 2009, it was reported that the Ibis population at the gardens had decreased by 69% since the program's introduction. However, the Ibis population continued to be an ongoing issue for the Gardens in the years which followed.

=== Kershaw Gardens ===
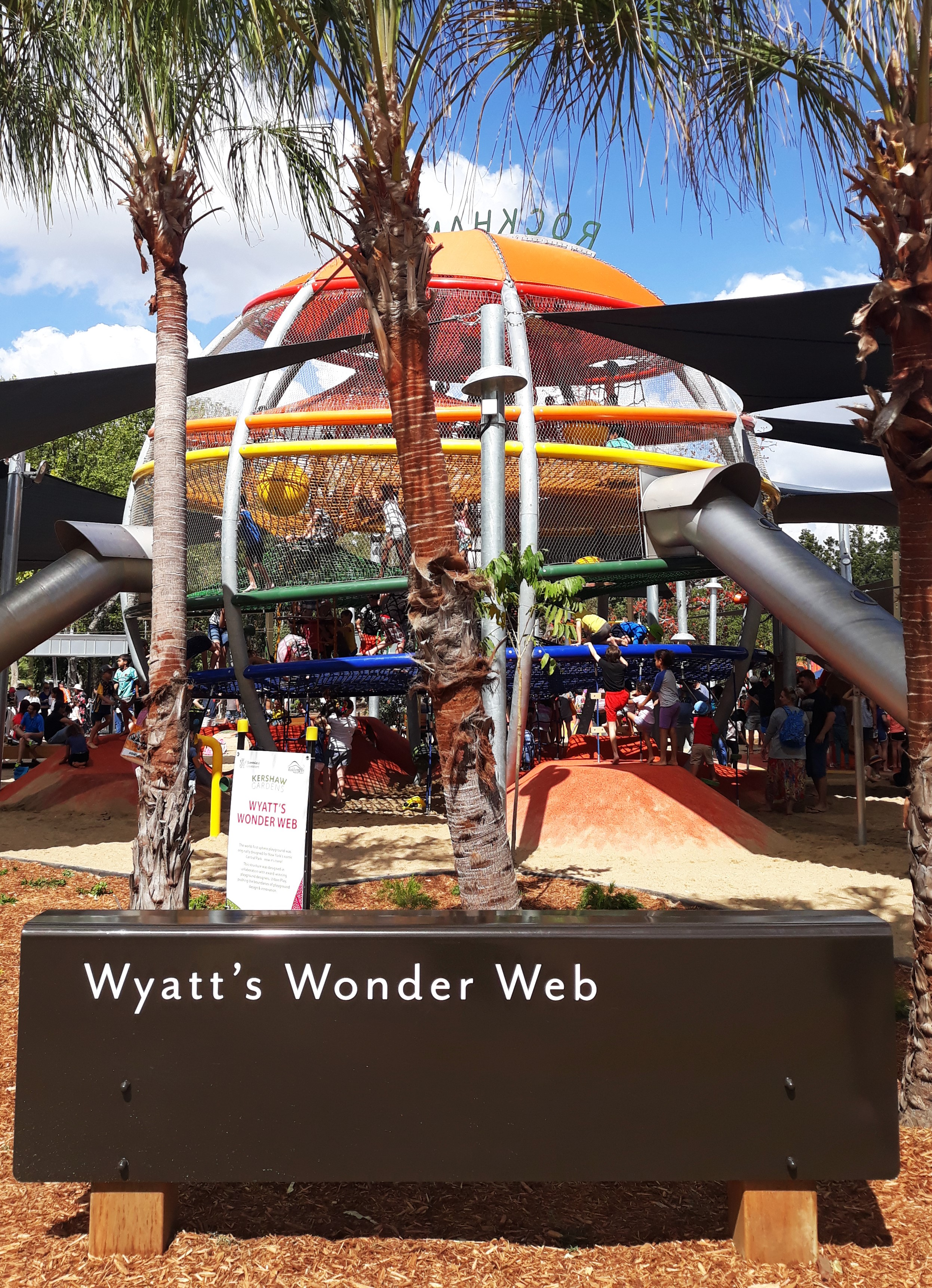
Wyatt's Wonder Web playground attraction at Kershaw Gardens, 2018

Arguably, Wyatt's biggest accomplishment during his time with Rockhampton City Council was helping transform the old Rockhampton landfill on Moores Creek Road into a lush 50-hectare area of parkland called Kershaw Gardens.

As the council's parks and gardens manager, he designed and developed the gardens for the purpose of cultivation, research and preservation of Australian flora.

Becoming a bicentennial project, the gardens were officially opened as Cliff Kershaw Gardens by Harry Butler on 18 September 1988.

During his campaign to be elected as a councillor at the 2012 local government elections, Wyatt was a vocal critic of the plan to demolish the old North Rockhampton railway station which had been relocated to Kershaw Gardens from its original site. The plan to demolish the station was first proposed in 2012 with Rockhampton Regional Council citing termite damage as the reason. Wyatt accused the council of neglect and questioned why the termite activity hadn't been noticed earlier. The station was eventually demolished in 2017 ahead of the redeveloped Kershaw Gardens' reopening following Cyclone Marcia.

After Kershaw Gardens sustained considerable damage during Cyclone Marcia in 2015, the gardens were temporarily closed to allow for them to be redeveloped, which included incorporating a new central precinct with newly installed barbeque facilities, playground equipment and water play area.

One of the new attractions in the playground area was a spherical play structure which was named "Wyatt's Wonder Web" in Wyatt's honour. At the official reopening, Wyatt was also presented with a 1:36 miniature replica of one of the new colourful leaf statues which had been erected at the main entrance to Kershaw Gardens.

== Gardening Talkback ==
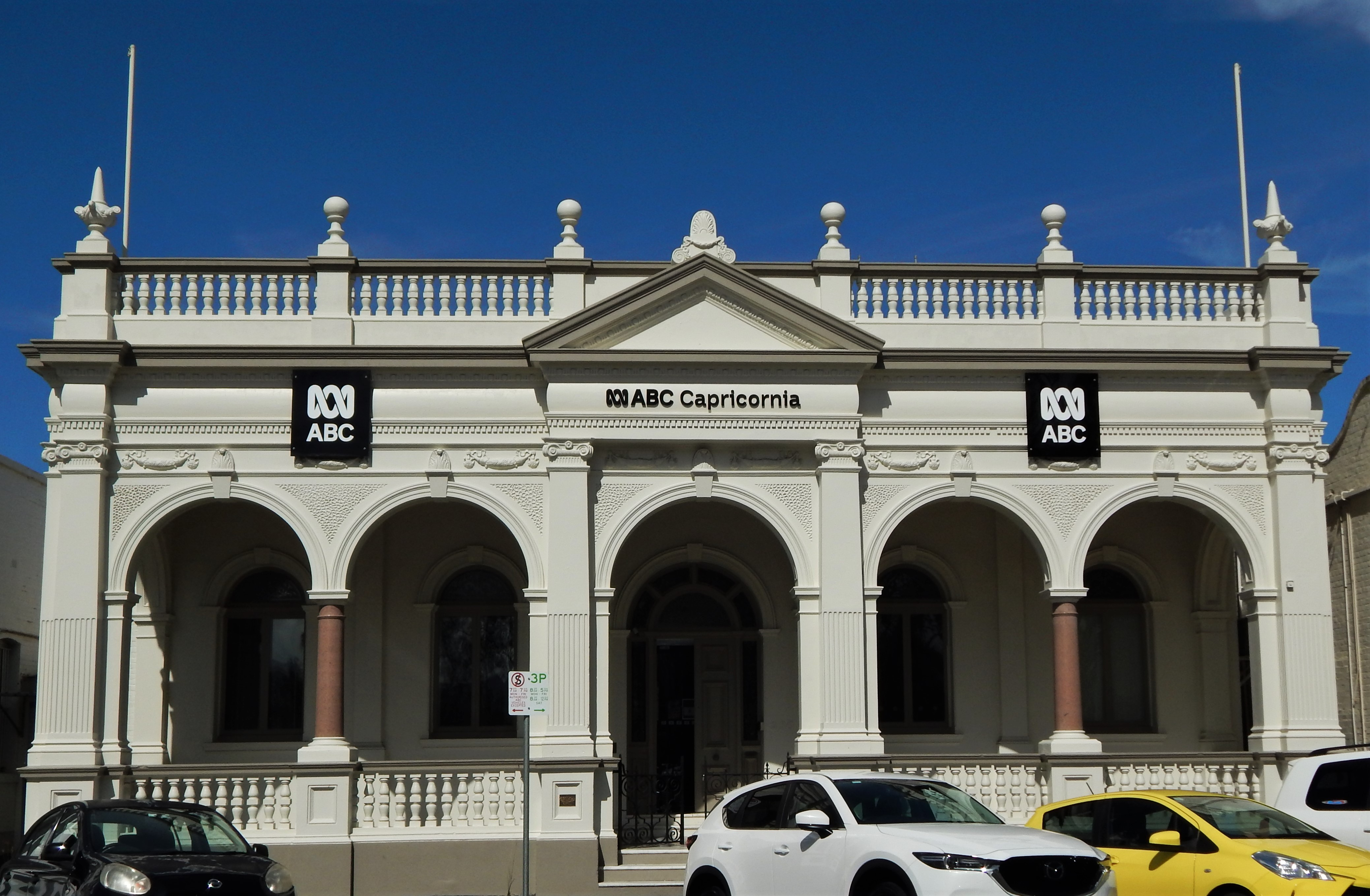
The ABC Capricornia studios in Rockhampton where Wyatt hosted Gardening Talkback for 40 years

Wyatt became a regular guest on local Rockhampton ABC station 4RK in 1982 when the staff discussed the idea of incorporating a 10-minute gardening segment into the local morning program.

Due to his work at Rockhampton City Council, Wyatt was approached to be the resident gardening expert, to which he agreed. With his no-nonsense and straight talking manner, the segment quickly grew in popularity and was extended to a half-hour program before being further extended to the full 60-minute Gardening Talkback program which was networked to other local ABC stations throughout Queensland at 10 am on Friday mornings from the ABC Capricornia studios in Rockhampton.

In 2017, Wyatt celebrated Gardening Talkback's 35th anniversary.

After approximately 40 years since its inception, the final edition of Gardening Talkback went to air on 29 July 2022 with Wyatt's family being present during his last show.

Upon his retirement, Wyatt named Craig Zonca as one of the most memorable presenters he had worked with due to the pair building up an on-air rapport after Zonca slightly changed the pace of the program during his tenure.

Due to the popularity of Gardening Talkback, Wyatt travelled extensively throughout Queensland and was regularly invited to various events throughout the state as a special guest speaker.

== Books ==
In 1999, Wyatt released All Your Gardening Questions Answered which was published by Central Queensland University. In 2006 he released The ABC of Gardening which was also published by Central Queensland University Press.

A second edition of All Your Gardening Questions Answered was published by Boolarong Press in 2011.

== Politics ==
In 2011, Wyatt joined a steering committee which was established on the Capricorn Coast to review the controversial amalgamation of Livingstone Shire, Mount Morgan Shire, and Fitzroy Shire with Rockhampton City Council in 2008.

Prior to the 2012 local government elections, Wyatt was touted as a possible Rockhampton Region mayoral candidate to potentially run against the council's inaugural mayor, Brad Carter. However, Wyatt later confirmed he would not run for mayor but would instead run as a candidate for the Capricorn Coast-based Division 2 position. Wyatt was successful in his bid, beating incumbent Brett Svendsen and commenced serving as the Division 2 councillor under the newly elected Rockhampton Region mayor, Margaret Strelow, a former mayor of Rockhampton City Council.

During Wyatt's term as a councillor with Rockhampton Regional Council, the former Livingstone Shire campaigned hard to de-amalgamate in an attempt to resurrect the former council. Wyatt indicated that if Livingstone Shire Council was resurrected, he would be keen to run as a councillor with that council. In a letter published in The Morning Bulletin, former state MP for Keppel Paul Hoolihan controversially claimed Wyatt was not eligible to do so as he resided in the Rockhampton suburb of Parkhurst. Wyatt denied that he lived in Parkhurst, but said he did stay at his partner's address on Monday and Tuesday evenings prior to council meetings at City Hall to avoid the 35-minute morning commute from his Kinka Beach property.

After the successful de-amalgamation campaign in which 57% of residents in the former Livingstone Shire voted to split from the Rockhampton Region, Wyatt expressed interest in standing as a mayoral candidate for the regenerated local government area. However, he ultimately endorsed former Livingstone mayor Bill Ludwig who was elected to the position.

Wyatt served as a Livingstone Shire councillor until 2020 when he decided not to stand as a candidate at the local government elections in March 2020.

== Community roles ==
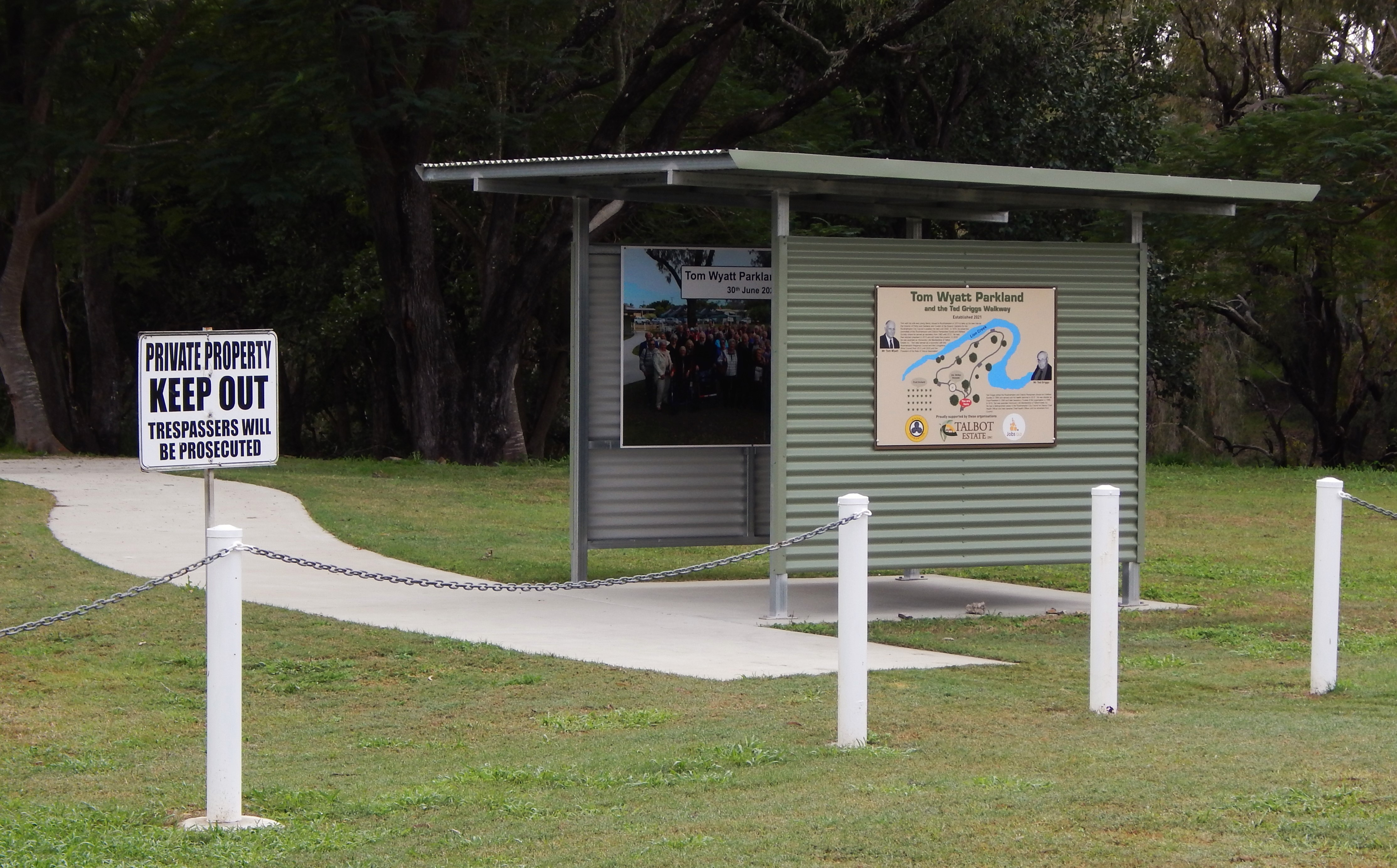
Tom Wyatt Parkland, named in Wyatt's honour, on the Talbot Estate in Rockhampton, 2022

In 1976, Wyatt joined the Rockhampton & District Pensioners Social and Welfare Society of which he was secretary from 1982 to 2013, and president from 2013.

Wyatt was a board member of the Talbot Estate, an independent living estate in the suburb of Wandal from 1976 and was president from 2010. He was the third president since the estate was established, following Rex Pilbeam and Laurie Georgeson.

Wyatt was also the president of the Rockhampton branch of the Rats of Tobruk Association.

Wyatt was known for making a boiled pineapple fruit cake which he has entered into competitions including the annual agricultural shows in Rockhampton and Mount Morgan. He also traditionally baked a Christmas fruit cake for the staff at ABC Capricornia each year.

== Recognition ==
In 2006, Wyatt was awarded a Pride of Australia award in the environmental category with the judges praising him for initiating the Greening of Rockhampton initiative and for his role in converting a refuse tip into the acclaimed Kershaw Gardens.

In 2021, Wyatt officially unveiled new signage at the parklands on the Talbot Estate which were named in his honour.

== Death ==
Wyatt died on 1 January 2025 at the age of 78. His death prompted a number of tributes from the local community.
