= Jeltz =

Jeltz is a surname. Notable people with the surname include:

- Steve Jeltz (born 1957), American baseball player
- Prostetnic Vogon Jeltz, character in The Hitchhiker's Guide to the Galaxy
- Wyatt F. Jeltz (1907–1975), African American philanthropist and sociologist
