= Wyatt =

Wyatt may refer to:

== People ==
- Wyatt (given name)
- Wyatt (surname)

== Places ==
=== Antarctica ===
- Wyatt Glacier, in southern Graham Land
- Wyatt Hill, a small ice-covered hill, Marie Byrd Land
- Wyatt Island, an island off the west coast of Graham Land

=== United States ===
- Wyatt, Indiana, an unincorporated community in St. Joseph County
- Wyatt, Missouri, a city in Mississippi County
- Wyatt, Mississippi, a former town in Lafayette County
- Wyatt, West Virginia, an unincorporated community in Harrison County

=== Elsewhere ===
- Wyatts Green, a settlement in Essex, England

== Other uses ==
- Donald W. Wyatt Detention Facility, a privately operated federal prison in Central Falls, Rhode Island, US
- Wyatt (band), a Canadian country music group
- Wyatt (novel), a 2010 crime novel by Australian novelist Garry Disher

== See also ==
- Wyatt House (disambiguation), a list of places known as Wyatt House or Wyatt Hall
- Whyatt, a surname and given name
