= Wyat =

Wyat may refer to:

- Edwin Wyat (1629-1714), English politician
- "WYAT (Where You At)", song by SB17

== See also ==
- Wyatt (disambiguation), surname, given name and other meanings
