= Thomas Wyatt =

Thomas Wyatt may refer to:

- Thomas Wyatt (poet) (1503–1542), English poet
- Thomas Wyatt the Younger (1521–1554), rebel leader and a central character in Sir Thomas Wyatt, history play by John Webster and Thomas Dekker
- Thomas Wyatt (painter) (1799–1859), English portrait-painter
- Thomas Henry Wyatt (1807–1880), British architect
- Thomas Charles Wyatt (1850–1920), American politician
- Thomas Wyatt Turner (1877–1978), American civil rights activist, biologist and educator
- Tom Wyatt (1946–2025), Australian horticulturalist
- Tom Wyatt (rugby union), (born 1999), English rugby union player
