= Chris Wyatt =

Chris Wyatt is the name of:

- Chris Wyatt (media executive) (born 1957), English-American corporate executive, primarily in film and television
- Chris Wyatt (producer) (born 1975), American film producer, writer and second unit director
- Chris Wyatt (rugby union) (born 1973), Welsh rugby union footballer
- Chris Wyatt (born 1969), American television producer and internet executive, founded website Godtube

== See also ==
- Wyatt (surname)
