= Jim O'Regan =

Jim O'Regan may refer to:

- Jim O'Regan (cricketer) (1938–1998), Australian cricketer
- Jim O'Regan (hurler) (1901–1982), Irish hurler and Gaelic footballer
