= Houses at 28–36 Beacon Street =

Historic houses in Massachusetts, United States

- U.S. National Register of Historic Places
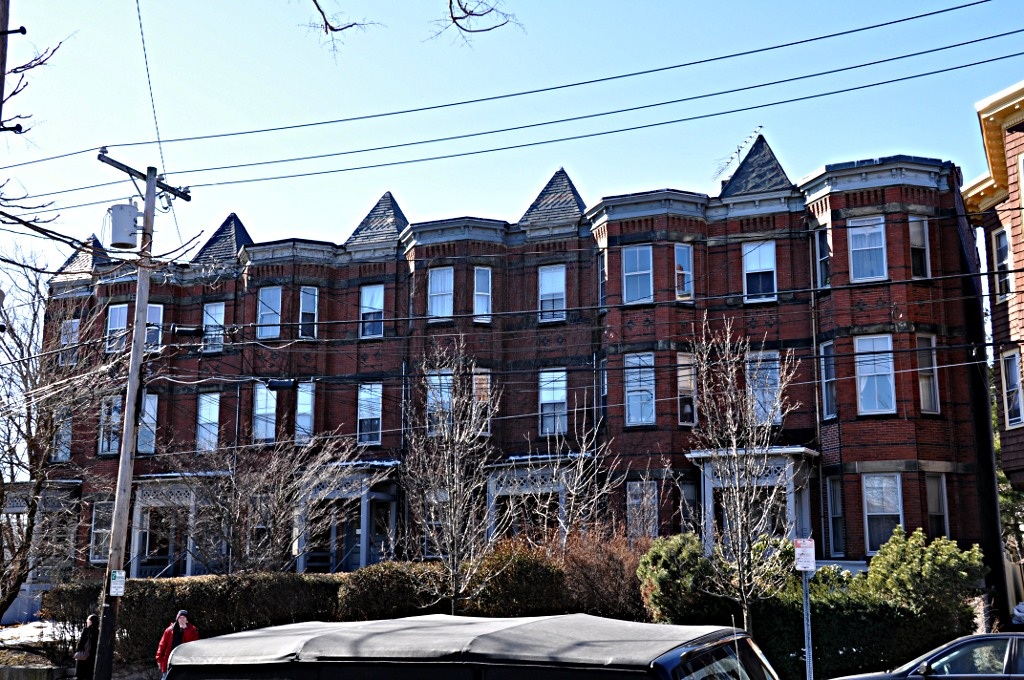

- Location within Massachusetts Location within the United States
- Location: 28–36 Beacon St., Somerville, Massachusetts
- Coordinates: 42°22′31″N 71°6′12″W
- Built: 1880
- Architectural style: Queen Anne
- MPS: Somerville MPS
- NRHP reference No.: 89001232
- Added to NRHP: September 18, 1989

The houses at 28–36 Beacon Street in Somerville, Massachusetts are a series of Queen Anne style brick rowhouses. The five identical houses were built c. 1880 on land formerly part of a brickyard owned by George Wyatt, whose own house stands across the street. The facade of each house is divide vertically into two sections: the left one is flat, and is topped by a square turret roof, with a single story portico sheltering double entrance doors, and the right sight is a polygonal project bay rising the full three stories. The shallow roof cornices are studded with brackets.

The rowhouses were listed on the National Register of Historic Places in 1989.

== See also ==
- National Register of Historic Places listings in Somerville, Massachusetts
