= Patrick McGorry =

Australian psychiatrist

Patrick McGorry AO
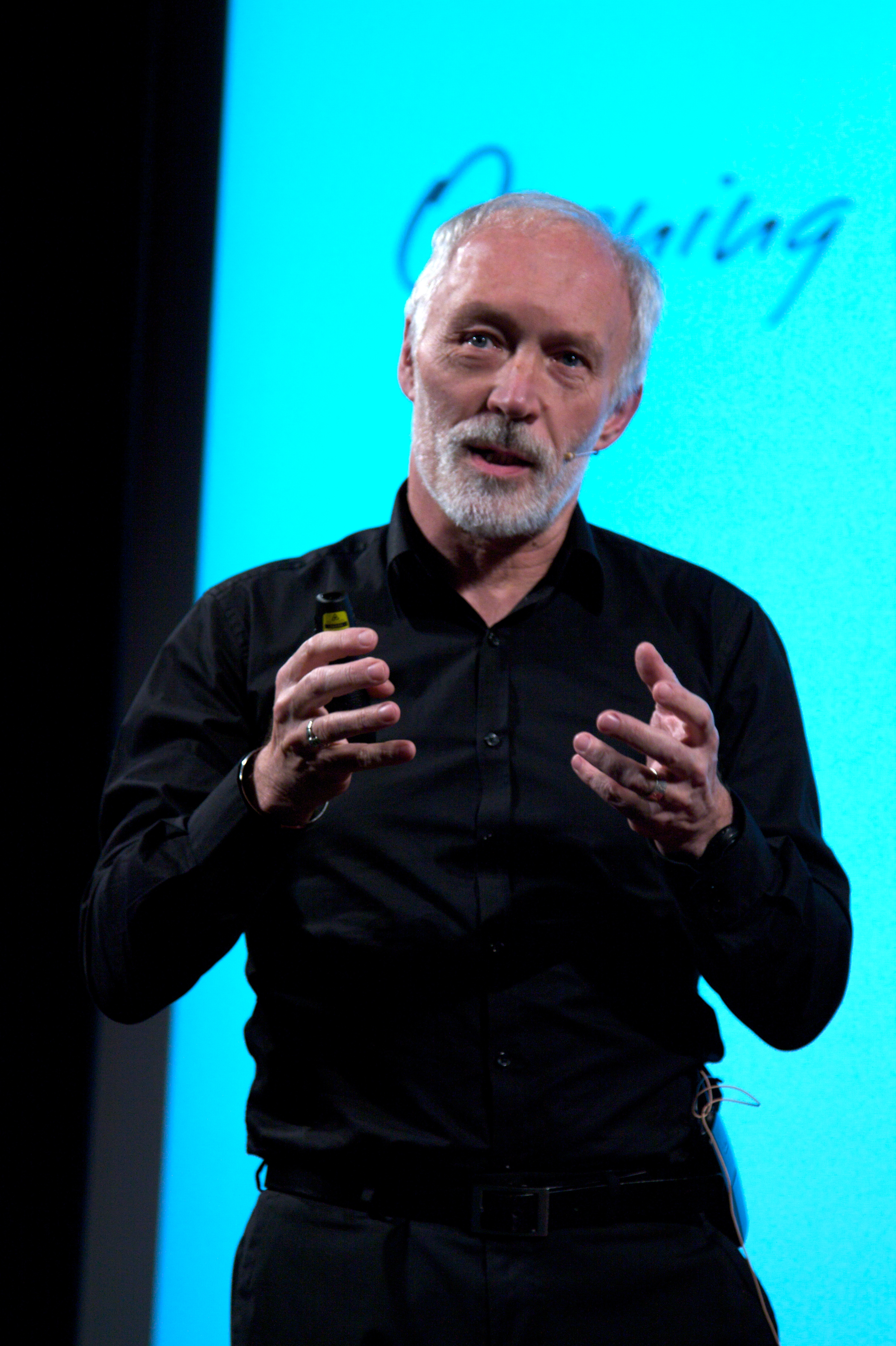
- McGorry in 2010
- Born: 10 September 1952 (age 74); Dublin, Ireland
- Education: Bishop Gore School; Newcastle Boys' High School
- Alma mater: University of Sydney; Monash University; University of Melbourne
- Occupation: Psychiatrist
- Organization(s): Orygen, The National Centre of Excellence in Youth Mental Health
- Known for: Development of the early intervention services for youth psychosis
- Title: Australian of the Year
- Term: 2010
- Predecessor: Mick Dodson
- Successor: Simon McKeon
- Spouse: Merilyn Hawke (m. 1980)
- Children: Three
- Awards: Order of Australia
- Website: www.patmcgorry.com.au

Patrick Dennistoun McGorry (born 10 September 1952) is an Irish-born Australian psychiatrist known for his development of the early intervention services for emerging mental disorders in young people.

== Position ==
McGorry is Professor of Youth Mental Health at the University of Melbourne. He has written more than 640 peer-reviewed articles, published in journals including The Lancet, the British Journal of Psychiatry, the American Journal of Psychiatry and the Medical Journal of Australia. He is executive director of Orygen, The National Centre of Excellence in Youth Mental Health and founding editor of Early Intervention in Psychiatry published by the International Early Psychosis Association. McGorry also advocated strongly for the establishment of the Australian government funded National Youth Mental Health Foundation, which became headspace, and is a founding board member of that organisation.

== Early intervention in psychosis ==
McGorry and his colleagues developed an approach for young people who have symptoms of psychosis for the first time, based at the EPPIC clinic in Melbourne. This EPPIC clinic has played a key part in an early psychosis treatment paradigm for psychiatry and has led to significant reform of mental health services, especially in the United Kingdom. The EPPIC program's approach is best represented by the catch phrase "A stitch in time." A linked development is the PACE clinic: a service for young people with sub-threshold symptoms who are at risk of developing psychosis.

Initial evaluations of EPPIC showed that it was not only effective compared to the previous traditional model of care but that it was also cost effective. McGorry was awarded the Centenary Medal in 2003 in recognition of his work on the EPPIC program.

McGorry has advocated to the Australian government to create a national network of early psychosis intervention centres, based on evidence that early treatment may improve long-term outcomes.

=== Criticisms ===
McGorry has faced a number of criticisms of his work.

Early intervention for psychosis was initially met with resistance due to a claimed lack of evidence. In 2011, a systematic review concluded: "There is some support for specialised early intervention services, but further trials would be desirable, and there is a question of whether gains are maintained." Some critics have argued that McGorry has exaggerated the evidence for early intervention and that long-term benefits and economic savings have not been established, and one has gone as far as alleging that McGorry has "systematically misled" the Australian Government about the nature and implications of his evaluation study on EPPIC by misstating the description of the control group.

In the past two decades evaluations in England and Denmark have shown that early intervention is effective over the first two years of care at least, but when patients return to traditional care some of the gains are lost.

McGorry's views on giving antipsychotic medication to at-risk young people have been criticised by a number of people, including Allen Frances the Chair of the DSM-IV Taskforce, on the basis that most at-risk young people will not become psychotic and pre-emptive treatment may be risky.

A proposed trial of the antipsychotic medication quetiapine, led by McGorry, attracted criticism on ethical grounds.

He has been accused of having a conflict of interest in using his position on a government advisory committee to advocate for programs that he founded. McGorry has denied that he has any conflict of interest and a spokesperson for the Australian government stated that McGorry was just one member of the Mental Health Expert Working Group, which was made up of experts from a range of health and non-health sectors, plus consumer and carer representatives and 'while these consultations helped to inform the development of the government's record mental health package, decisions on the specific content...were solely a matter for the government'. On 25 September 2012, Western Australian member of parliament Martin Whitely made a speech in parliament criticising the Australian Government for its support of McGorry's proposals. Whitely said that McGorry had made overblown claims for his programs and that they had been accepted without proper scrutiny.

== Headspace ==
Early intervention in psychosis has paved the way for a broader model of care ("headspace") that targets a range of youth mental disorders. Headspace was originally founded under the Howard government with its support continuing under the Gillard government. Its design and national rollout has gained bipartisan support. During the 2013 Australian Federal election, McGorry appeared in the media together with then Opposition Leader Tony Abbott at the launch of the Liberal–National Coalition's mental health policy. Abbott promised that, if elected, he would provide additional financial support for research and translation programs associated with Patrick McGorry. After being elected to government, the Coalition announced in its first budget the allocation of $18M over 4 years to Orygen Youth Health Research Centre for establishment of a National Centre of Excellence in Youth Mental Health and $14.9M to headspace for the expansion of its youth mental health services. In 2018 the Turnbull government committed to a three-year extension of funding ($13.5 million) to Orygen, The National Centre of Excellence in Youth Mental Health, and also committed an additional $30 million to headspace.

== Recognition and other activities ==
In January 2010 McGorry was named Australian of the Year for his services to youth mental health. In June 2010 he was appointed an Officer of the Order of Australia.

In 2013 McGorry was honoured with the National Alliance on Mental Illness Scientific Research Award, the first time the award has been bestowed upon a researcher outside of the United States.

In 2015, McGorry was awarded the Lieber Prize for Outstanding Achievement in Schizophrenia Research, given by the Brain & Behavior Research Foundation.

In 2018 he was awarded the Lifetime Achievement Award by the Schizophrenia International Research Society. He was the first psychiatrist elected as a Fellow of the Australian Academy of Science.

McGorry served as President of the Society for Mental Health Research (Australia) (2013–2017), Schizophrenia International Research Society (2016–2018), and International Early Psychosis Association (1997–2006). As of 2018 he was president of the International Association for Youth Mental Health. He was a member of the Million Minds Mission for mental health launched by the Australian Government in 2018.

On 10 October 2023, McGorry initiated and was one of 25 Australians of the Year who signed an open letter supporting the Yes vote in the Indigenous Voice referendum. He said he was driven to do so out of fear for the damage to mental health that Indigenous Australians would suffer if the Voice is rejected.

In 2024, McGorry was made an honorary member of the Royal Irish Academy.
