= Robert Wyatt (disambiguation) =

Robert Wyatt (born 1945) is an English progressive rock musician

Robert Wyatt may also refer to:

- Robert B. Wyatt (born 1940), American book editor, fiction writer, and publisher
- Robert E. Wyatt, chemistry professor at University of Texas at Austin
- Bob Wyatt (1901–1995), English cricketer
