= Richard Wyatt =

Richard Wyatt may refer to:

- Richard James Wyatt (1795–1850), English sculptor
- Richard Wyatt (cricketer), English cricketer
- Richard Wyatt Jr. (1955–2024), American muralist
- Richard Jed Wyatt (1939–2002), American psychiatrist and schizophrenia researcher
