= Henry Wyatt =

Henry Wyatt may refer to:

- Sir Henry Wyatt (courtier) (1460–1537), English courtier
- Henry Wyatt (artist) (1794–1840), English portrait, subject and genre painter
- Henry H. Wyatt (1840–?), member of the Wisconsin State Assembly
- Henry Lawson Wyatt (1842–1861), first Confederate enlisted soldier to die in the American Civil War
