= Wyatt House =

Wyatt Hall or Wyatt House may refer to:

== Historic buildings ==
=== United States ===
- Wyatt House (Desha, Arkansas), listed on the NRHP in Arkansas
- W. R. and Louisa E. Wyatt House, Lewiston, Idaho, listed on the NRHP in Idaho
- George Wyatt House, Somerville, Massachusetts, NRHP-listed
- W. W. Wyatt House, Enterprise, Mississippi, listed on the NRHP in Mississippi
- Samuel Wyatt House, Dover, New Hampshire, NRHP-listed
- Leonidas R. Wyatt House, Raleigh, North Carolina, listed on the NRHP in North Carolina
- Wyatt Hall (Chattanooga, Tennessee), listed on the NRHP in Tennessee
- Wyatt Hall (Franklin, Tennessee), NRHP-listed
- Wyatt-Hickie Ranch Complex, Stephenville, Texas, listed on the NRHP in Texas
- Arthur D. and Emma J. Wyatt House, Brattleboro, Vermont, listed on the NRHP in Vermont
- Penn-Wyatt House, Danville, Virginia, NRHP-listed

=== Other places ===
- Wyatt House, Adelaide, South Australia

== Other uses ==
- Wyatt Hall (actor), a voice actor
