= David Wyatt =

David Wyatt may refer to:

- David Wyatt (artist) (born 1968), English commercial artist
- David K. Wyatt (1937–2006), American historian and author
- David Wyatt (politician) (1949–2015), American farmer and politician in Arkansas
- Dave Wyatt, Negro leagues infielder and manager
