= Jean Addington =

Canadian psychiatrist and researcher

- Education: BEd, University of Saskatchewan; MA, University of Edinburgh; PhD, 1987, University of Calgary
- Scientific career
- Fields: Psychiatry
- Institutions: University of Calgary
- Thesis: Cognitive functioning and positive and negative symptoms in schizophrenia (1987)

Jean Margaret Addington FRSC FCAHS is a Canadian clinical psychologist. She is a professor at the University of Calgary and a member of the Mathison Centre for Mental Health Research and Education, the Hotchkiss Brain Institute, and the Alberta Children’s Hospital Research Institute. Her research focus is on psychosis and schizophrenia, intending to find predictors and mechanisms for mental illness. She is a Fellow of the Royal Society of Canada.

== Education ==
Addington completed her Bachelor of Education degree at the University of Saskatchewan before enrolling at the University of Edinburgh for her Master's degree. After receiving her MA degree in English, Addington accepted a summer position at a psychiatric centre for people with schizophrenia and other serious mental illnesses. She then returned to Canada for her PhD in clinical psychology at the University of Calgary, and received her accreditation as a registered psychologist in 1988.

== Career ==
Upon completing her PhD, Addington founded and directed Calgary's Early Psychosis Program and helped establish the "Prevention through Risk Identification, Management and Prevention" (PRIME) clinics in Calgary and Toronto. The main purpose of the PRIME clinics was to develop more accurate early detection methods for those at risk for psychosis. Through data from PRIME's first-episode clinic, Addington's research team were able to refine the universal understanding of which "prodromal," or pre-illness, symptoms are the most predictive. She also helped develop a new rating scale for the measurement of depression in schizophrenia. Beyond the PRIME clinics, Addington also served as one of the principal investigators in the North American Prodrome Longitudinal Study (NAPLS).

In 2019, Addington was awarded the International Early Intervention and Prevention in Mental Health Association's Richard Wyatt award as an individual who has made "a remarkable contribution to the area of early intervention." She was also elected a Fellow of the Canadian Academy of Health Sciences and Royal Society of Canada.
