= James Wyatt (disambiguation) =

James Wyatt (1746–1813) was an English architect.

James Wyatt may also refer to:

- James Wyatt (art dealer) (1774–1853), English art dealer, collector, patron, curator and Mayor of Oxford.
- James Bosley Noel Wyatt (1847–1926), American architect
- James Wyatt (game designer) (born c. 1968–1969), American game designer
- James Wyatt (air engineer) (active 1920–1922), English aviator
- James Ray Wyatt, American politician
