= George Wyatt =

George Wyatt may refer to:

- George Wyatt (writer) (1553–1624), writer on Anne Boleyn, son of rebel Thomas Wyatt
- George Wyatt (cricketer) (1850–1926), English cricketer
- George Wyatt, pen name of Charles Spain Verral, author of the Brains Benton children's mystery books series
- George Harry Wyatt (1886–1964), English recipient of the Victoria Cross
- George W. Wyatt (1848–?), teacher and state legislator in Texas

== See also ==
- George Wyatt House, Somerville, Massachusetts
