= Thomas McGlashan =

Dr. Thomas McGlashan (born 1942) is an American professor of psychiatry at Yale University, well known for his academic contributions to the study of schizophrenia and other mental illnesses.

== Professional career ==
He obtained his medical qualification from the University of Pennsylvania in 1967, and was a staff member in Chestnut Lodge, where according to the New York Times, May 23, 2006, McGlashan "strived for years to master psychoanalysis, only to reject it (for psychosis) after demonstrating, in a landmark 1984 study, that the treatment did not help much at all in people ... with schizophrenia.". These long term follow up and reported outcomes for patients with schizophrenia are known as the Chestnut Lodge studies.

In the 1990s he embarked upon work focused on interventions early in the course of schizophrenia, and became an early advocate and researcher in early detection and intervention for psychosis, including being a key participant in the Norway early detection studies (TIPS) and PRIME studies on early treatment of those at risk of schizophrenia The study reported that the drug Olanzapine had a "trend significant" effect in preventing conversion to psychosis and that further, larger studies are warranted.

Professor Thomas McGlashan is the current recipient of the Richard Wyatt Award, of the International Early Psychosis Association, and of the Psychiatric Research Award of the American Psychiatric Association for his contributions to the field of early detection and intervention in psychosis.

== Books ==
- The documentation of clinical psychotropic drug trials by Thomas H McGlashan - 1973)
- The Borderline: Current Empirical Research by Thomas H. McGlashan (1985)

Co-authored:

- Early Intervention in Psychotic Disorders (Nato Science Series: D Behavioural and Social Sciences, Volume 91) (NATO Science Series D: (closed)) by Tandy Miller, Sarnoff A. Mednick, Thomas H. McGlashan, and Jan Libiger (Hardcover - Nov 2001)
- Schizophrenia: Treatment Process and Outcome by Thomas H. McGlashan and Christopher J. Keats (1989)
- A Developmental Model of Borderline Personality Disorder: Understanding Variations in Course and Outcome by Patricia Hoffman Judd and Thomas H. McGlashan (2002)
