= John Wyatt =

John Wyatt may refer to:

- John Wyatt (baseball) (1935–1998), American baseball player
- John Wyatt (cricketer) (1919–2015), New Zealand cricketer
- John Wyatt (inventor) (1700–1766), joint inventor of roller spinning
- John Wyatt (shortstop) (born 1947), 1st round pick of the L.A. Dodgers in the 1965 draft
- John Wyatt (writer) (1925–2006), writer and first Ranger to the Lake District National Park in England
- John Wyatt (surgeon) (1825–1874), English army surgeon
- John Wyatt (bishop) (1913–2004), bishop of the Episcopal Diocese of Spokane

== See also ==
- Jonathan Wyatt (born 1972), long-distance runner from New Zealand
