= International Early Intervention and Prevention in Mental Health Association =

- Formation: 1998
- Type: Professional association
- President: Alison Yung (Australia)
- Key people: Patrick McGorry - Treasurer; Sung-Wan Kim - VP Asia Pacific; Maria Michail - VP Europe; Shannon Pagdon - VP Lived Experience Research; Uta Ouali - VP Middle East & North Africa; Kate Hardy - VP North America; Pablo Gaspar - VP South & Central America; Naeem Dalal - VP Sub-Saharan Africa
- Website: www.iepa.org.au

The International Early Intervention and Prevention in Mental Health Association (IEPA), is a professional body and international network for those with an interest in early intervention in mental health and early psychosis intervention. The organisations headquarters are located in Parkville, a suburb of Melbourne, in Victoria, Australia.

== History ==
The need for a professional network was proposed at a conference in Stratford-upon-Avon, England, in June 1997, and the association was formed in 1998. With an initial focus on early intervention in psychosis the organisation was originally named the International Early Psychosis Association. From 2016-2024 the association was known as the International Early Intervention in Mental Health Association. This change in name reflected a shift in focus, broadening the influence of early intervention beyond psychosis to mental health.

== Executive group and membership ==
The IEPA is governed by a group of officers, elected by members every two years. Membership of the association is free and open to anyone with an interest in early intervention. Membership may be applied for online. There are over 8,500 members as of 2024.

=== Executive and members ===
As of February 2024 the executive and members consist of the following people:

- Eoin Killackey -Past president
- Philippe Conus - President elect
- Alison Yung - President
- Patrick McGorry - Treasurer
- Sung-Wan Kim - VP Asia Pacific
- Maria Michail - VP Europe
- Shannon Pagdon - VP Lived Experience Research
- Uta Ouali - VP Middle East & North Africa
- Kate Hardy - VP North America
- Pablo Gaspar - VP South & Central America
- Naeem Dalal - VP Sub-Saharan Africa
- Juliana Onwumere
- Takahiro Nemoto
- Stefania Tongin
- June Brown
- Andrea Raballo

== Conferences ==
Following the inaugural conference in Melbourne in 1996 (Verging on Reality), international academic conferences have been held every two years in New York City (2000), Copenhagen (2002), Vancouver (2004), Birmingham (2006), Melbourne (2008), Amsterdam (2010), San Francisco (2012), Tokyo (2014), Milan (2016) and Boston (2018). In 2020 the conference was held for the first time in virtual format.

A second virtual conference was held November 8–12, 2021. IEPA's 13th International Conference on Early Intervention in Mental Health was to be held in Singapore in 2022, however was cancelled due to the COVID-19 pandemic.

The IEPA's most recent conference, IEPA14, the 14th International Conference on Early Intervention in Mental Health, was held in Lausanne, Switzerland (2023). IEPA's next biennial conference IEPA 15 will be held in Berlin, Germany in September 2025.

The association has awarded the Richard J. Wyatt Award, named for Richard Jed Wyatt, to key contributors to the field of early psychosis since 2004. The recipients of this award have been:

- Patrick McGorry (2004)
- Max Birchwood (2006)
- Thomas McGlashan (2008)
- Alison Yung (2010),
- David Shiers (2012)
- Eric Chen (2014)
- Merete Nordentoft (2016)
- Jan Olav Johannessen (2018)
- Jean Addington (2020)
- Mark van der Gaag (2023)

== Peer reviewed journal ==
The association has endorsed the Early Intervention in Psychiatry, a peer reviewed journal. The inaugural issue was in February 2007 with Patrick McGorry as editor-in-chief.
