= Mark Wyatt =

Mark Wyatt may refer to:

- Mark Wyatt (rugby union, born 1961) (born 1961) Bermudan-born Canadian rugby union player
- Mark Wyatt (rugby union, born 1957) (born 1957) Welsh rugby union player
- F. Mark Wyatt (1920–2006), CIA agent
