= Alan Wyatt =

Australian cricketer (1935–2024)

Personal information
- Full name: Alan Edward Wyatt
- Born: 4 April 1935; Annandale, Sydney, Australia
- Died: 11 July 2024 (aged 89)
- Batting: Left-handed
- Bowling: Right-arm fast-medium

Domestic team information
- Years: Team
- 1956/57–1958/59: New South Wales

Career statistics
Competition	First-class
Matches	20
Runs scored	179
Batting average	13.76
100s/50s	0/0
Top score	40
Balls bowled	3,208
Wickets	40
Bowling average	33.45
5 wickets in innings	2
10 wickets in match	0
Best bowling	5/36
Catches/stumpings	7/–
- Source: Cricinfo, 19 January 2024

Alan Edward Wyatt (4 April 1935 – 11 July 2024) was an Australian cricketer. He played twenty first-class matches for New South Wales between 1956–57 and 1958–59.

Wyatt was an opening bowler and tail-end batsman who played three seasons for New South Wales. In their last match of the 1956–57 Sheffield Shield, he helped New South Wales avoid defeat against Victoria by making 40 at number 10 in New South Wales' follow-on after taking 5 for 100 in Victoria's first innings. The draw enabled New South Wales to retain the Shield; a loss would have given the Shield to Queensland. Wyatt's best bowling figures were 5 for 36 and 2 for 41 in the victory over South Australia in 1957–58; he made 32 in the New South Wales first innings, adding 61 for the last wicket with Jim O'Regan.

Wyatt played for Western Suburbs in Sydney. He was inducted into the club's Hall of Fame in 2011. He died in July 2024, at the age of 89.
