= Wyatt (given name) =

Male given name

Wyatt is a male given name, derived from the Norman surname Guyot, derived from "widu", Proto-Germanic for "wood".

== Notable people with the given name "Wyatt" include ==
- Wyatt Agar (born 1981), American politician
- Wyatt Aiken (1863–1923), American politician
- Wyatt Allen (born 1979), American rower
- Wyatt Anderson (1939–2023), American biologist
- Wyatt Bardouille, American filmmaker
- Wyatt Rainey Blassingame (1909–1985), American author
- Wyatt Borso (born 2004), American soccer player
- Wyatt Brichacek (born 2000), American racing driver
- Wyatt Cenac (born 1976), American comedian, actor, producer, and writer
- Wyatt Emory Cooper (1927–1978), American author
- Wyatt Creech (born 1946), New Zealand politician
- Wyatt Crockett (born 1983), New Zealand rugby player
- Wyatt Cullen (born 2008), American ice hockey player
- Wyatt Davis (born 1999), American football player
- Wyatt Durrette (politician) (born 1938), American attorney and politician
- Wyatt Durrette (songwriter), American singer-songwriter
- Wyatt Earp (1848–1929), American gambler
- Wyatt Eaton (1849–1896), Canadian-American painter
- Wyatt P. Exum (1836–1911), American farmer
- Wyatt Flores (born 2001), American singer-songwriter
- Wyatt Gallery, American photographer
- Wyatt George Gibson (1790–1862), British banker
- Wyatt Gooden (born 1988), American racing driver
- Wyatt Gould (1879–1960), Welsh rugby union footballer
- Wyatt C. Hedrick (1888–1964), American architect
- Wyatt Henderson (born 1956), American football player
- Wyatt Houston (born 1994), American football player
- Wyatt Hubert (born 1998), American football player
- Wyatt F. Jeltz (1907–1975), American educator
- Wyatt Johnston (born 2003), Canadian ice hockey player
- Wyatt Jones (born 1970), American canoeist
- Wyatt Kaiser (born 2002), American ice hockey player
- Wyatt Kalynuk (born 1997), Canadian ice hockey player
- Wyatt Knight (1955–2011), American actor
- Wyatt Langford (born 2001), American baseball player
- Wyatt Mason (born 1969), American journalist
- Wyatt Mathisen (born 1993), American baseball player
- Wyatt Miller (born 1995), American football player
- Wyatt Mills (born 1995), American baseball player
- Wyatt Milum (born 2001), American football player
- Wyatt Nash (born 1988), American television personality
- Wyatt Oleff (born 2003), American actor
- Wyatt Omsberg (born 1995), American soccer player
- Wyatt Outlaw (1820–1870), American politician
- Wyatt Papworth (1822–1894), English architect
- Wyatt Prunty (born 1947), American poet
- Wyatt Ray (born 1996), American football player
- Wyatt Rice (born 1965), American guitarist
- Wyatt Roy (born 1990), Australian politician
- Wyatt Russell (born 1986), American actor
- Wyatt Ruther (1923–1999), American bassist
- Wyatt Sanford (born 1998), Canadian boxer
- Wyatt Sexton (born 1984), American football player
- Wyatt Smith (born 1977), American ice hockey player
- Wyatt A. Stewart, American businessman
- Wyatt Teller (born 1994), American football player
- Wyatt C. Thomas (??–1874), American politician
- Wyatt Toregas (born 1982), American baseball player
- Wyatt Townley (born 1954), American poet
- Wyatt Tremblay (born 1960), Canadian cartoonist
- Wyatt Turner (1909–1986), American baseball player
- Wyatt Tee Walker (1928–2018), American pastor
- Wyatt Webb (1941–2003), American basketball coach
- Wyatt C. Whitley (1900–1982), American chemist
- Wyatt Wishart, Canadian wrestler
- Wyatt Worthington II (born 1987), American golfer

== Fictional characters ==
- A character in the Adventure Time episode "Elements Part 6: Happy Warrior"
- Wyatt Callow, a character from the dystopian science fiction novel The Hunger Games: Sunrise on the Reaping
- Wyatt Halliwell, a character in the TV series Charmed
- Wyatt Spencer, a character on the soap opera The Bold and the Beautiful
- Wyatt Wingfoot, a character in the comic book series Marvel Comic
