= Whyatt =

Whyatt is both a surname and a given name. Notable people with the name include:

- Christopher Whyatt (born 1954), English cricketer
- Nick Whyatt (born 1984), English ice hockey player
- J. Whyatt Mondesire (1949–2015), American journalist
- Whyatt Beanstalk, the alter-ego of the titular protagonist in the Canadian animated preschool television series Super Why!

== See also ==
- Wyatt (disambiguation)
