= Robert B. Wyatt =

American book editor (born 1940)

- Born: May 19, 1940 (age 86); Miami, Oklahoma, U.S.
- Occupations: Editor; writer; publisher
- Known for: Available Press, A Wyatt Book
- Awards: Carey–Thomas Award, Literary Market Place Award

Robert B. Wyatt (born May 19, 1940, in Miami, Oklahoma) is an American book editor, as well as a fiction writer and publisher. He has had a long career devoted to the publication of fiction, including nearly 20 years at Avon, and nearly a decade at Ballantine. Though most of the imprints for which he worked were primarily paperback reprint concerns, under his own imprints Available Press (Ballantine) and A Wyatt Book (St. Martin's Press), he was able to issue original literature and to launch the careers of an eclectic list of contemporary authors.

== Biography ==
Wyatt's first job in publishing began in 1962 at the Doubleday Bookstores chain in New York City, where he was manager of the flagship store's paperback department. After two years of bookselling, he moved to Avon Books.

Wyatt left Avon in 1969 to become editorial director at Delacorte Press, where he published the first young adult novels by R. R. Knudson and Norma Fox Mazer & Harry Mazer.

After two years, he returned to Avon, where he eventually became editor in chief. At Avon, he edited and published first or early work by many emerging writers, including Russell Banks, William Kotzwinkle, Fanny Howe, Paul Monette, David Plante, Gregory Mcdonald, Michael McDowell, Marianne Wiggins, Thomas M. Disch, and Frank Herbert. In translation, he also published works by Reinaldo Arenas, Márcio Souza, Quim Monzó, Monique Wittig, Jorge Amado, Lygia Fagundes Telles, and many novelists of the Latin American Boom, the explosion of interest in South American literature in the early 1980s.

At Avon, Wyatt was known was the "million-dollar man" because he acquired the reprint rights to a number of books with seven-figure advances, including The Thorn Birds, The Final Days, Alive: The Story of the Andes Survivors, and I'm OK – You're OK.

As head of Ballantine Books, beginning in 1983, he published novels by Charles Palliser, Sarah Smith, Jon Hassler, Paul Rudnick, Richard North Patterson, Rafael Yglesias, W. P. Kinsella, Bryce Courtenay, and Katherine Neville (sometimes in association with other Random House imprints).

Under his Available Press imprint at Ballantine (established in 1985), Wyatt issued novels by, among others, Pat Barker and Derek Raymond; translations of works by Moacyr Scliar, Rosario Ferré, Ernesto Sabato, Quim Monzó, and Ignacio de Loyola Brandão; poetry by William Heyen and Antler, and titles in the early days of graphic books by David Suter and Janwillem van de Wetering with Paul Kirchner. Wyatt left Ballantine in the spring of 1992.

His imprint at St. Martin's Press, A Wyatt Book, included works published from 1994 to 1997 by such authors as Anita Diamant, Douglas Preston, Katherine Vaz, Paullina Simons, Kevin Brownlow, Douglas Unger, Bill Richardson, Patti Kim, and Calvin Baker.

In 2002, after having left St. Martin's, he revived the A Wyatt Book imprint in association with the Woodstock, New York, bookstore The Golden Notebook to publish Janice King's Taking Wing: Poems from the Oregon Outback to the Hudson Valley.

In recent years, he has worked with Anne Bartlett, Nicholas Jose, and Azhar Abidi of Australia, Chandrahas Choudhury of India, and Musharraf Ali Farooqi and Michelle Farooqi of Canada and Pakistan.

== Awards ==
Honored by Publishers Weekly with its Carey–Thomas Award for “excellence in quality publishing in a mass market format,” Wyatt also received the Literary Market Place Award for his work at Ballantine, where he conceived The Available Press, employing unusual editorial, design, printing, and distribution schemes for nearly a hundred original titles.

== Bibliography ==
Wyatt is the author of two novels, which tell the same story from a different point of view. Jam & the Box (A Wyatt Book Inc., 2009) is the primary story. Its companion is a shorter work, The Fluffys & the Box (A Wyatt Book Inc., 2010), narrated by two cats.

Wyatt's short story "Strands" won Grand Prize in the Strand Bookstore "Share the Love Short Story Contest" held in February 2011.
