= Joseph Wyatt =

Joseph Wyatt may refer to:

- Joseph Wyatt (theatre owner) (1788–1860), Australian theatre owner
- Joseph P. Wyatt Jr. (1941–2022), member of the U.S. House of Representatives
