= Chris Wyatt (media executive) =

English-American corporate executive

Christopher J. Wyatt (born 1957) is an English-American executive who was executive vice president of and president, International, of Blockbuster Inc.

Wyatt received his BA with honors from Sheffield University and is a fellow of the Institute of Management Accounting. Wyatt started working for Blockbuster in 1996 . Prior to joining Blockbuster, Wyatt was finance director of distribution at Hays, PLC.
