= Matthew Wyatt =

Matthew Wyatt may refer to:

- Matthew Digby Wyatt (1820–1877), British architect and art historian
- Matthew Cotes Wyatt (1777–1862), painter and sculptor
- Matt Wyatt (born 1978), American rugby union player
