= Henry Wyatt (artist) =

English painter (1794–1840)

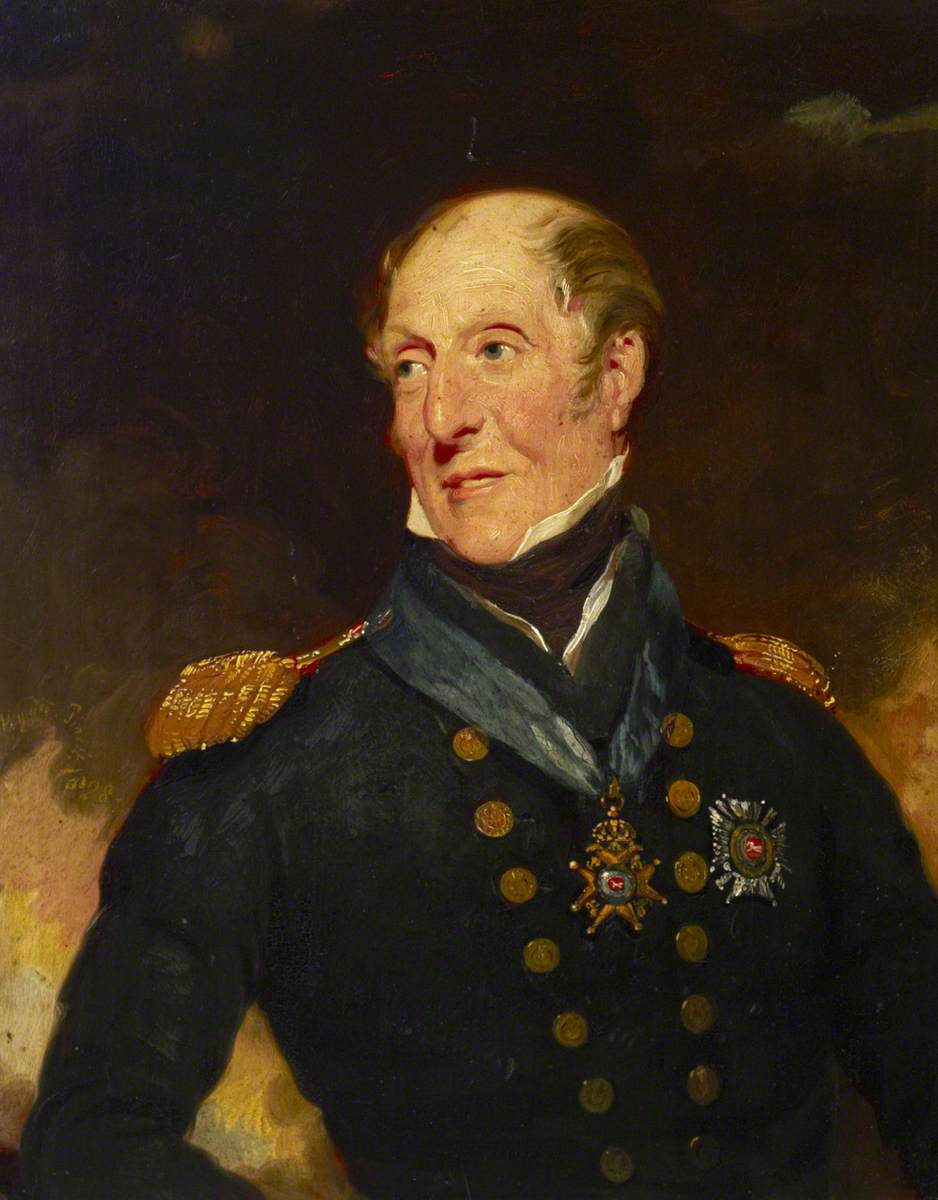
Rear-Admiral Sir Charles Cunningham (1833–34)

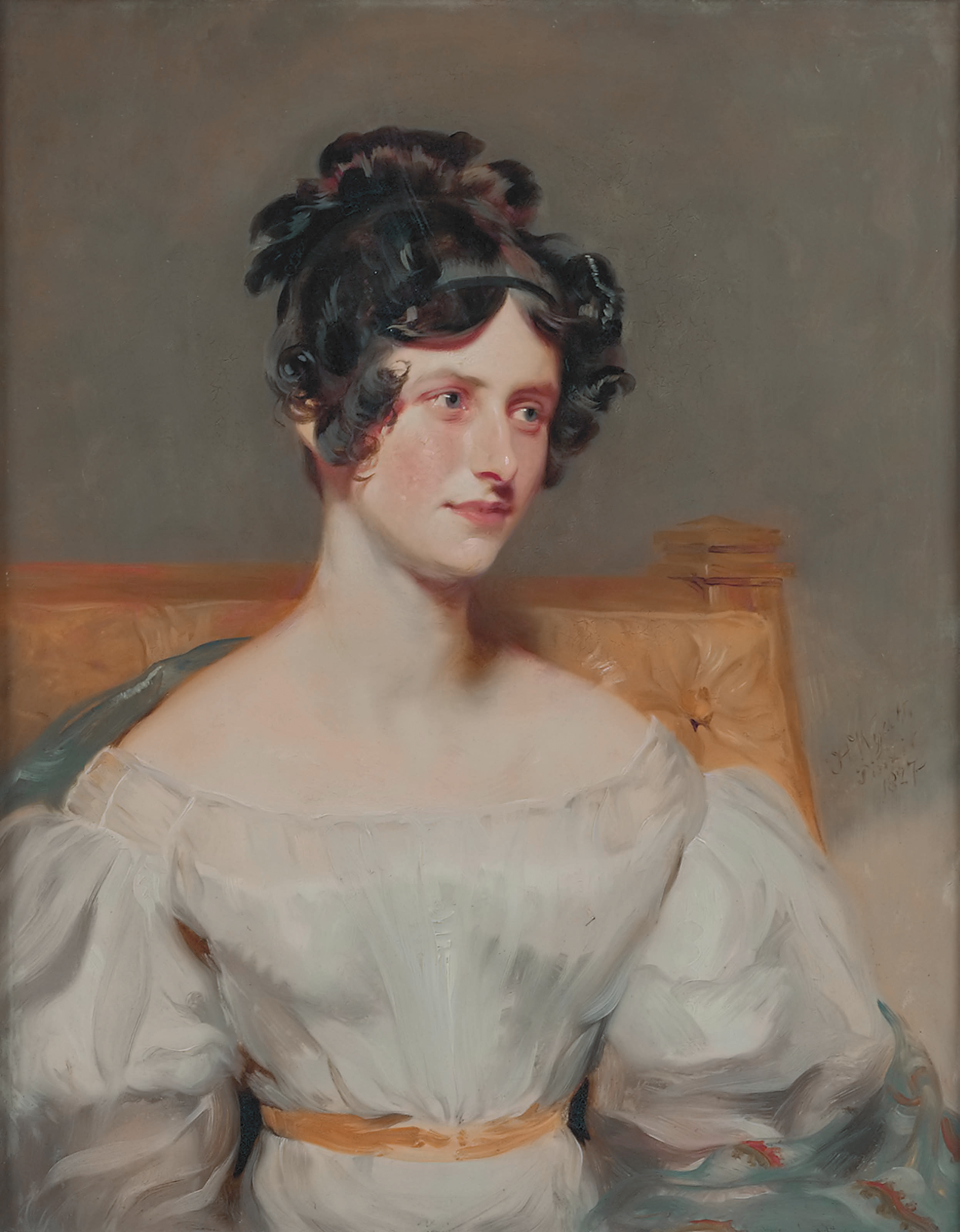
Mrs. Henry William Wilson (1827)

Henry Wyatt (17 September 1794 – 27 February 1840), was an English portrait, subject, and genre painter.

== Life and work ==
Wyatt was born at Thickbroom, near Lichfield, Staffordshire on 17 September 1794. On the death of his father, when he was only three years old, he went to live at Birmingham with his guardian, Francis Eginton, the well-known glass-painter, who, finding he had an aptitude for art, sent him to London in 1811, and in the following year he was admitted to the school of the Royal Academy. In 1815, he entered the studio of Sir Thomas Lawrence as a pupil.

At the end of 1817, he established himself as a portrait-painter, practising first at Birmingham and successively at Liverpool, and Manchester, also painting occasional subject pictures. In 1825, he settled in London, where he resided in Newman Street until 1834, when ill-health obliged him to move to Leamington. It was his intention to return to London in 1837, but having some portrait commissions in Manchester he first visited that town, and in the following April was seized with paralysis, from which he never recovered.

Wyatt died at Prestwich, near Manchester, on 27 February 1840, and was buried in the churchyard of that village.

He was a clever artist, a skilful draughtsman, and a good colourist, and both his portraits and subject-pictures earned him considerable popularity. "Vigilance" (Tate gallery) which was exhibited in the Royal Academy in 1836 (it was engraved by G. A. Periam); the "Philosopher", also called "Galileo" and "Archimedes", a fancy portrait, half-length life-size, exhibited at the Royal Academy in 1832 (engraved by Robert Bell).

Popular works include: "Fair Forester" and "Proffered Kiss" (both engraved by George Thomas Doo), "Juliet", "Chapeau Noir", "Gentle Reader", "The Romance", "Clara Mowbray", and "Mars and Venus". He painted a portrait of Thomas Harrison (1744–1829), which was hung in Chester Castle, of which he was the architect. William Bradley (1801–1857) painted a portrait of Wyatt in 1839.

He was a man of refined tastes, living a quiet bachelor life, but, as his sketch-books show, always industriously working at every variety of drawing; family groups, landscapes, cattle, buildings, shipping, animals of many kinds and flowers were alike drawn with the utmost care and with much ability. He exhibited 80 pictures in London between 1817 and 1838, including 35 at the Royal Academy.

His younger brother, Thomas Wyatt (1799?–1859), was also a portrait painter.
