= Richard Jed Wyatt =

American psychiatrist and schizophrenia researcher

- Born: June 5, 1939; Los Angeles, California, U.S.
- Died: June 7, 2002 (aged 63); Washington, D.C., U.S.
- Education: Johns Hopkins University
- Spouses: Rollyn Simon Wyatt; Kay Redfield Jamison
- Children: 3
- Scientific career
- Fields: Psychiatry
- Workplaces: National Institute of Mental Health

Richard Jed Wyatt (June 5, 1939 – 7 June 2002) was an American psychiatrist and schizophrenia researcher.

== Career and Research ==
Wyatt was born in Los Angeles and graduated from Johns Hopkins University Medical School and joined the National Institutes of Health (NIH) in 1967, where he established a schizophrenia research program. In 1972 he became chief of the neuropsychiatry branch at the NIH. He was one of the early pioneers who studied the biological basis of schizophrenia in the lab. His research led to the first evidence that monoamine oxidase inhibitors (MAOIs) suppressed REM sleep and could treat narcolepsy.

He was a writer, educator and teacher, having authored over 800 research articles and 6 books and He has trained many neuroscientists. The Richard J. Wyatt Award from the International Early Intervention and Prevention in Mental Health Association is named after him in recognition of his work on early interventions in schizophrenia.

He was married to Rollyn Simon Wyatt and later to clinical psychologist and author Kay Redfield Jamison. He had three children. With Jamison he co-produced several films about manic depressive illness. Wyatt died of lung cancer on 7 June 2002 at the age of 63 in Washington, D.C. Jamison authored a 2009 book, Nothing Was the Same: A Memoir, recounting her relationship with Wyatt and the process of grieving after his death.
