= Arthur Wyatt =

Arthur Wyatt may refer to:

- Arthur Wyatt (diplomat) (1929–2015), British diplomat
- Arthur Wyatt (writer) (born 1975), British writer
- Arthur Guy Norris Wyatt (1893–1982), English naval officer
