= Charles Wyatt =

Charles Wyatt may refer to:

- Charles Wyatt (architect) (1758–1819), English architect and member of parliament
- Charles Wyatt (writer), American musician and writer
- Charles Wyatt (politician), New Zealand solicitor and politician
