= Rockhampton Music Bowl =

Outdoor sound shell music venue in Rockhampton, Australia

- Interactive map of Rockhampton Music Bowl
- Location: Nuttall Street, Parkhurst, Queensland
- Coordinates: 23°19′3″S 150°30′50″E
- Owner: Rockhampton Regional Council

Construction
- Opened: 9 March 1985
- Architects: Cruice, Andrews & Partners
- Builder: Graham Evans (Qld) Pty Ltd
- Services engineer: Arnold Hugh Philp

The Rockhampton Music Bowl is an outdoor sound shell music venue in Rockhampton, Queensland, Australia, situated in the suburb of Parkhurst.

The venue was officially opened by Rockhampton City Council alderman, Dr Terence Francis Moore on 9 March 1985.

Throughout its history, the Rockhampton Music Bowl has hosted numerous concerts, festivals and local events.

Notable international and Australian musicians who have performed at the Rockhampton Music Bowl include Cliff Richard, John Denver, Stevie Wonder, Midnight Oil, INXS, Hunters And Collectors, Savage Garden, Silverchair, Dwight Yoakam, Powderfinger, Gyroscope, The Butterfly Effect, Youth Group, Dead Letter Circus, Operator Please, Evermore, The Potbelleez, Zoe Badwi, TV Rock, Bag Raiders, Bombs Away, Emily Scott, Seany B, Timmy Trumpet, Daryl Braithwaite, Mental As Anything, Russell Morris, Richard Clapton and 1927.

The venue has also been the traditional home of the city's popular Carols by Candlelight family event, held every December.

Rockhampton Regional Council decided to close the Rockhampton Music Bowl in 2011 and put it up for sale, citing maintenance costs, financial viability and lack of usage. The council had also long held the view that the venue was unpopular with visiting musicians who preferred to perform at other venues such as the Pilbeam Theatre, the Rockhampton Showgrounds, Callaghan Park or local pubs and clubs.

During the closure, the annual Carols by Candlelight was held at the Rockhampton Heritage Village, Victoria Park and the Pilbeam Theatre.

In 2014, public debate and campaigning from local media personalities and community leaders to reopen the Rockhampton Music Bowl increased.

Rockhampton Regional Council eventually relented and withdrew the Rockhampton Music Bowl from the market and announced that the 2015 Carols by Candlelight would be the first event to be held after it was reopened.

Since re-opening, the Rockhampton Music Bowl is again being used for various local events, concerts and music festivals including the 2016 "Rocky Rocks" music festival. Another concert, "Sea FM Live" was also scheduled for 2016, but the tour promoters cancelled the event soon after announcing it due to "unforeseeable circumstances".
