= Scott Wyatt =

Scott Wyatt may refer to:

- Scott Wyatt (politician), American politician in the Virginia House of Delegates
- Scott A. Wyatt (born 1951), composer of electroacoustic music
- Scott L. Wyatt, president of Southern Utah University
