= Marcus Wyatt =

Marcus Wyatt may also refer to:

- Marcus Wyatt (musician) (born 1971), South African musician
- Marcus Wyatt (skeleton racer) (born 1991), British skeleton racer
