= John Wyatt (surgeon) =

John Wyatt (1825–1874) was an English army surgeon.

== Life ==
Wyatt was the eldest son of James Wyatt of Lidsey, near Chichester, yeoman, by his wife Caroline, and was baptised in the parish church of Aldingbourne, Sussex, on 28 October 1825.

He was admitted a member of the Royal College of Surgeons of England on 26 May 1848, becoming a fellow of that body on 13 December 1866. He entered the army medical service with the rank of assistant-surgeon on 17 June 1851, was gazetted surgeon on 9 April 1857, and surgeon-major on 9 January 1863, being attached throughout his life to the first battalion of the Coldstream guards. He was engaged in active service in the Crimean War, and was present at the battles of Alma, Balaclava, and Inkerman, and at the Siege of Sebastopol. At Inkerman his horse was shot under him. At the close of the war he received the Crimean medal with four clasps, the Turkish medal, and a knighthood of the Legion of Honour.

In 1870 he was selected by the War Department to act as medical commissioner at the headquarters of the French army during the Franco-German War, and in this capacity, he was present in Paris during the whole of the siege. At this time he rendered important services to the sick and wounded, for he was attached to an ambulance and was a member of the Société de Secours aux Blessés. For these services, he was made a Companion of the Bath in 1873. He died at Bournemouth on 2 April 1874, and was buried at Brompton Cemetery.
