= Benjamin Wyatt =

Benjamin Wyatt or Ben Wyatt may refer to:

- Benjamin Dean Wyatt (1775–1852), English architect
- Ben Wyatt (footballer) (born 1996), English footballer
- Ben Wyatt (politician) (born 1974), Australian politician
- Ben Wyatt (Parks and Recreation), fictional character introduced in 2010
