= Wyatt C. Thomas =

Arkansas newspaperman and judge

Wyatt C. Thomas (died February 19, 1874) was a newspaperman, state legislator, and judge in Arkansas.

== Biography ==
Thomas was assistant Adjutant General with the rank of captain during the American Civil War. He returned to Washington, Arkansas after the war and started practicing law. He founded the Pine Bluff Press in 1869 and he was the editor-in-chief until he died when Maj. Charles Gordon Newman took over until 1881. A member of the Arkansas Press Association, he was the paper's editor and publisher. He wrote a letter about the Battle of First Manassas.

Governor Isaac Murphy appointed Thomas as special probate judge for Hempstead County, Arkansas February 9, 1866. In 1870 he served as Secretary of the Arkansas Senate. Thomas died February 19, 1874 in Pine Bluff after being ill for some time.
