= Thomas Wyatt (painter) =

English painter

Thomas Wyatt (c.1799 – 1859) was an English portrait-painter, born at Thickbroom circa 1799. He studied in the school of the Royal Academy, and accompanied his brother Henry to Birmingham, Liverpool, and Manchester, practising as a portrait-painter without much success. In Manchester he tried photography. Eventually he settled as a portrait-painter in Lichfield, and died there on 7 July 1859. His works are best known in the Midland counties, and especially at Birmingham, where he held the post of secretary to the Midland Society of Artists.

== Personal life ==
Wyatt was the younger brother of the artist Henry Wyatt.

== Works ==
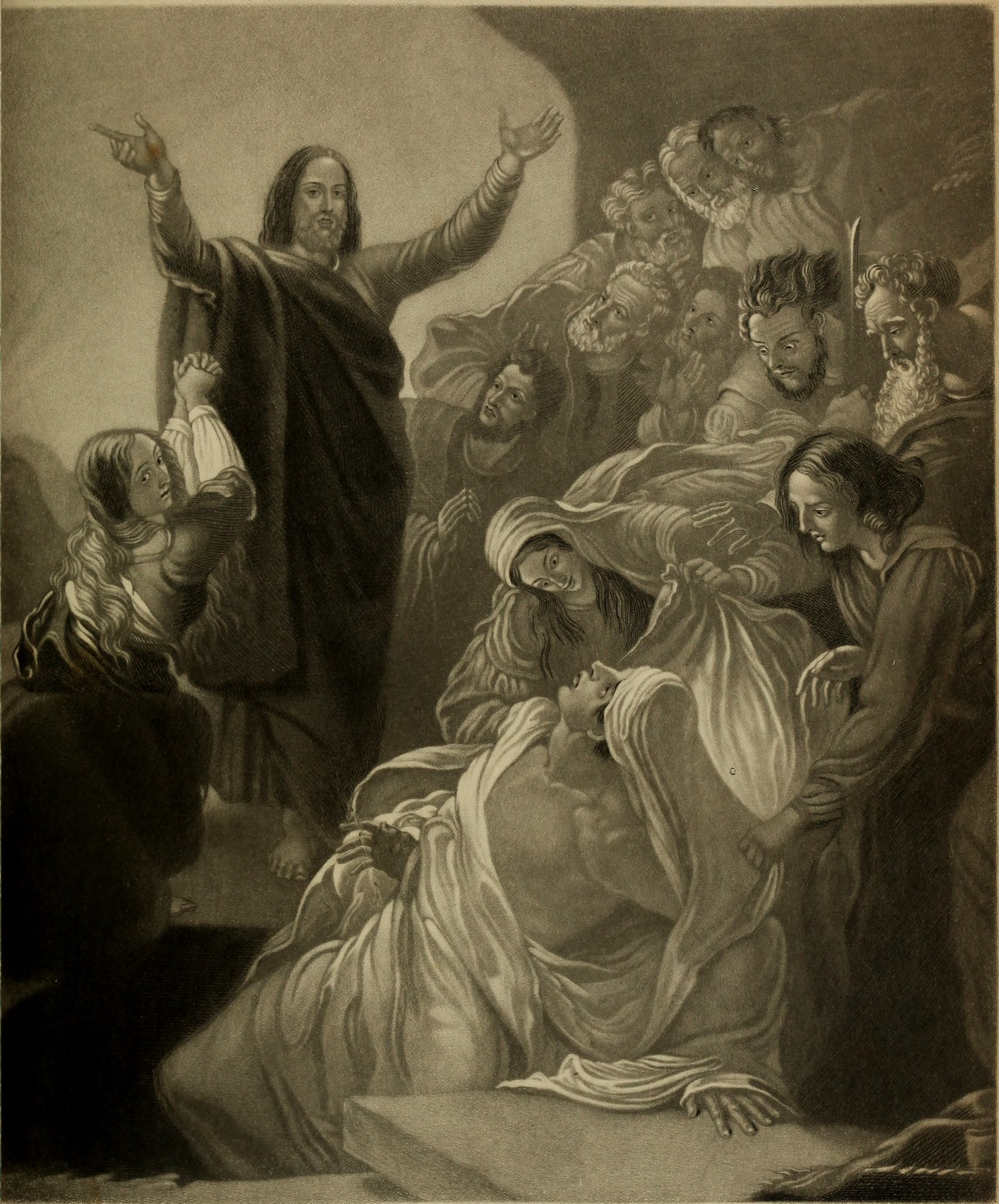
The Raising of Lazarus (illustration from ''Beauties of Sacred Literature)

- Thomas Wyatt (A. M.), A Manual of Conchology, Publisher Harper & Brothers, 1838
- Beauties of Sacred Literature: Illustrated by Eight Steel Engravings, edited by Thomas Wyatt, A.M., Publisher James Munroe & Company, 1848
