= North Rockhampton railway station =

Former railway station in Queensland, Australia

Coordinates: 23°22′22″S 150°31′23″E

North Rockhampton railway station was a railway station in The Common, Rockhampton, Queensland, Australia.

== History ==
The railway line from North Rockhampton to Emu Park was officially opened on Saturday 22 December 1888 by Archibald Archer, the local Member of the Queensland Legislative Assembly for Rockhampton.

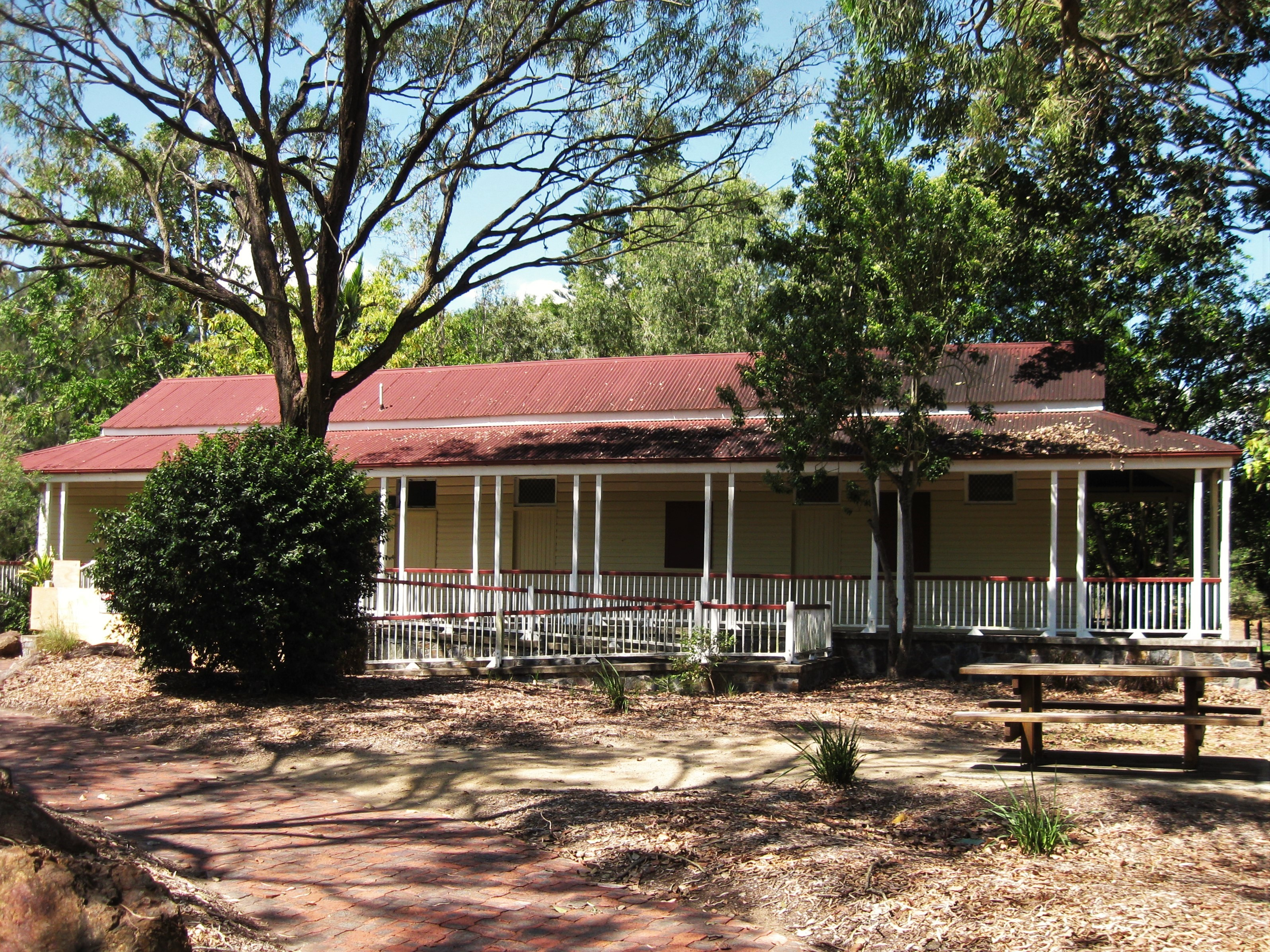
North Rockhampton railway station when it was located in Rockhampton's Kershaw Gardens, 2012

North Rockhampton railway station was the terminus of the line, which was built to give Rockhampton residents access to the seaside. Although Rockhampton had a railway station, it was on the southern side of the Fitzroy River and building a rail bridge across the river was seen as too expensive, so the line commenced on the north side of the river. However, having a disconnected railway line proved inconvenient and in 1899, the Rockhampton Junction railway line was built linking Rockhampton's main railway station with the North Rockhampton railway station via the Alexandra Railway Bridge over the Fitzroy River.

After the North Rockhampton railway station closed, it was relocated to Kershaw Gardens where it was used to house public toilets.

In 2012, Rockhampton Regional Council voted unanimously to demolish the building due to extensive termite damage which would have cost $128,000 to repair.

The building was eventually dismantled in 2017.
