= Kershaw Gardens =

Botanical garden in Queensland Australia

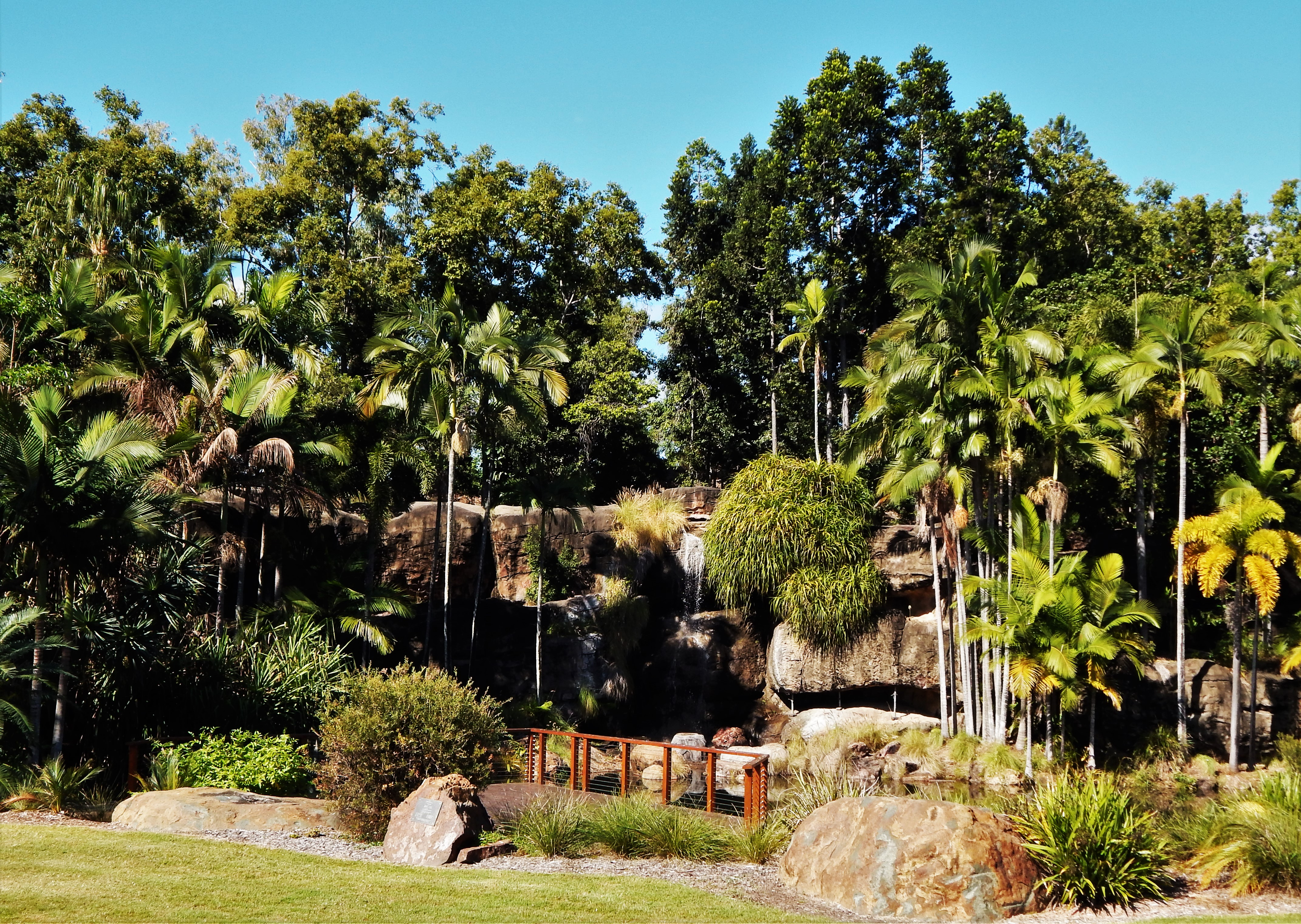
- Kershaw Gardens, 2022
- Interactive map of Kershaw Gardens
- Type: Botanical
- Location: Park Avenue, Queensland
- Coordinates: 23.362°S 150.515°E
- Area: 50 hectares (120 acres)
- Opened: 1988
- Owner: Rockhampton Regional Council
- Website: Official website

Kershaw Gardens is a 50-hectare (120-acre) park situated on an old landfill site in the Rockhampton suburb of Park Avenue in Queensland, Australia.

Officially opened in 1988, the parklands are bordered by the Bruce Highway (Moores Creek Road), High Street, Dowling Street and Moores Creek, which flows through the gardens on the eastern boundary, and into the Fitzroy River.

Kershaw Gardens consists of a network of nature walks, enabling visitors to inspect an array of native flora that has been planted throughout the area.

Other areas of the gardens include a scenic artificial waterfall, a slab hut, a dog training area and a large recreational area near the main highway entrance with a number of picnic shelters, a sensory garden and a children's playground area.

== History ==
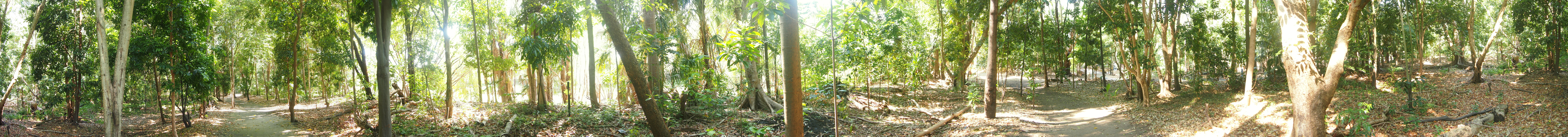
Panorama of Kershaw Gardens, 2012

=== 1988 Opening ===
Prior to the official opening of Kershaw Gardens, Rockhampton City Council spent twelve years developing the site from what used to be the city's main landfill. The council had originally proposed that a botanic gardens replace the landfill in 1974, with initial development commencing in 1976.

Kershaw Gardens was officially opened on 18 September 1988 as part of Australian Bicentenary celebrations, with about 10,000 people attending the event.

The gardens were named after the city's chief health inspector Cliff Kershaw, in recognition of his long service. After Kershaw died before to the official opening of Kershaw Gardens, members of his family attended instead and took part in a special commemorative service in his honour.

Prior to the official opening, a time capsule was placed near the Dowling Street entrance by the Rockhampton Bicentennial Community Committee, which was unveiled by Rockhampton City Council mayor Jim Webber on 26 January 1988. It will be opened on 26 January 2088 as part of the Australian Tercentenary.

A man-made scenic waterfall, fronting the highway at the north-western corner of Kershaw Gardens, was turned on at the official opening in 1988. However, it collapsed on 4 February 1989, prompting an outcry from Rockhampton ratepayers who considered the doomed $1 million attraction as a waste of money. A new waterfall was subsequently built on reinforced concrete. The second waterfall was opened in 1990. In 2010, it was revealed the waterfall was in urgent need of repair as a number of cracks and a leak through a retaining wall had been detected. The waterfall was switched off when Severe Tropical Cyclone Marcia damaged much of the gardens in February 2015. The council, wishing to show the community the gardens were taking the first steps to recovery, asked Queensland Deputy Premier Jackie Trad to symbolically switch the waterfall back on in May 2015.

Rockhampton's restored Purrey steam tram formed part of Kershaw Garden's original plans, which was intended to take visitors on short journeys throughout the parklands. The tram was briefly operational at Kershaw Gardens in 1990, to mark the opening of the second waterfall. However, maintenance of the tram and the track became too costly, and the tram was removed from Kershaw Gardens and eventually relocated to the Archer Park Rail Museum where it continues to operate each Sunday as the museum's main attraction. Some of the track and an old railway signal remained at Kershaw Gardens adjacent to the North Rockhampton Railway Station, until they were removed prior to the garden's reopening in 2018.

The North Rockhampton Railway Station had been relocated to Kershaw Gardens to be used as an amenities block and meeting place for community groups. However, over time the condition of the station deteriorated and it was eventually demolished in 2017. Rockhampton Regional Council had previously unanimously voted to demolish the building in 2012, citing an expensive repair bill to fix termite damage. The decision to demolish the railway station was criticised by former Rockhampton City Council parks and gardens manager Tom Wyatt, Rockhampton National Trust Working Group's Paul Bambrick and former Rockhampton City Council mayor Margaret Strelow, who at the time was running as a mayoral candidate in the 2012 local government elections.

One of the garden's most popular children's attractions was the Rotary Monorail, which was located near the Dowling Street entrance to the gardens. It was opened by Rockhampton Rotary President Colin Pyne on 23 September 1990. It consisted of several pedal-powered monorail cars that ran on a loop of track, with a lockable man-made fibreglass cave housing the cars overnight. In 2009, council identified that the clearance between the track and the ground did not meet minimum safety standards. The attraction was briefly closed while council laid fill material and built up the area below the track to a safer height. After the monorail was damaged by Cyclone Marcia in February 2015, the attraction was removed. A smaller version of the original monorail was installed in the new playground area, which was opened in 2018, as homage to the original, larger attraction.

In July 2012, Rockhampton Regional Council officially opened a new fully fenced dog agility park and off-leash area near the Charles Street entrance. The space incorporated an obstacle course in an attempt to alleviate dog-related issues council regularly deal with such as barking and roaming, brought about by boredom.

Prior to Cyclone Marcia which closed Kershaw Gardens for several years, new interactive electronic playground equipment was installed. Work on the new equipment had commenced in November 2014, but plans to open it were delayed due to a nearby power transformer being struck by lightning during a thunder storm. It was opened in January 2015. A wider $1.4 million upgrade to Kershaw Gardens was also planned at the time.

=== 2015 Closure ===
Much of Kershaw Gardens was severely damaged by Severe Tropical Cyclone Marcia when it struck Rockhampton on 20 February 2015.

The high number of trees that were uprooted during the cyclone brought contents from the old landfill to the surface, including glass, used syringes, medical waste, asbestos-filled material, and general refuse.

Rockhampton Regional Council closed Kershaw Gardens indefinitely and advised people to stay away due to the hazardous material that had been uncovered. Despite this, some members of the public ignored warnings and continued to visit the gardens with their children, forcing council to completely remove children's play equipment to deter trespassing.

When the waterfall at Kershaw Gardens was switched back on in May 2015, Rockhampton Regional Council mayor Margaret Strelow reminded the community that the waterfall was the only part of the gardens that could be viewed as extensive environmental remediation was still taking place. Strelow said due to the amount of rubbish that had been uncovered during the cyclone, Kershaw Gardens had essentially reverted to being a landfill.

In June 2015, Strelow publicly criticised Minister for Justice Michael Keenan who had told council that he "had trouble believing" that the damage to Kershaw Gardens could be "that bad". Strelow invited Keenan to Rockhampton, all expenses paid, so he could see the damage for himself.

Kershaw Gardens was partially re-opened in December 2015, with council holding a small event to celebrate. However, it was closed again soon after to allow for additional remediation works and for work to commence on a major redevelopment, in an attempt to restore Kershaw Gardens.

In July 2017, Minister for State Development Anthony Lynham announced that the Queensland Government would contribute $5 million to Rockhampton Regional Council's $6 million for the Kershaw Gardens restoration and upgrade.

=== 2018 Re-opening ===
Three and a half years after Severe Tropical Cyclone Marcia forced its closure, Kershaw Gardens was officially re-opened on 11 August 2018 with a family fun day.

The official reopening was originally scheduled for 4 August 2018, but complaints that it would have coincided with another major local event prompted council to amend the date. Queensland Premier Annastacia Palaszczuk was among the dignitaries who attending the event, which was also used to celebrate the 30th anniversary of Kershaw Gardens which was due to occur a month later. A traditional Darumbal smoking ceremony was held as part of the event.

Miniature replicas of the new giant leaf statues at the main Bruce Highway entrance were presented to former Rockhampton City Council parks and gardens manager Tom Wyatt, former Rockhampton City Council mayor Jim Webber, North Rockhampton Rotary president Kaleb Roberts, Des Ryan on behalf of the Hasker family, and Neil Kershaw on behalf of the Kershaw family. The statues were presented to recognise the efforts of those who helped establish Kershaw Gardens in 1988.

The new attractions which were unveiled at the official opening included a new children's playground area, the flagship of which is a spherical five-level structure, which was reported to have been originally designed for Central Park in New York. It was named "Wyatt's Wonder Web", in honour of local identity Tom Wyatt who, apart from a being a former Rockhampton City Council parks and gardens manager, is a former Rockhampton councillor, a current Livingstone Shire councillor and an ABC Local Radio personality, where he presents a weekly gardening program networked across a number of regional Queensland ABC stations. Strelow said the decision to name the structure Wyatt's Wonder Web was to honour Wyatt's role in establishing Kershaw Gardens, particularly for the design of building a botanic gardens on top of an old landfill site. Wyatt said he was honoured to have his input recognised, and recalled going on trips to collect seeds and plants to establish the gardens. The playground area also includes a flying fox, timber play towers, an omni-spinner, a birds nest swing and a water play area which includes a shallow 200mm-deep water course representing the Fitzroy River.

Safety concerns about the playground were raised in August 2018 when five steak knives were found buried in the sand. Strelow assured visitors to Kershaw Gardens that council workers inspected the equipment regularly and double-raked the sand each morning, but additional security measures would be implemented.

== Free RV camping controversy ==
In 2014, Rockhampton Regional Council transformed the carpark at the High Street entrance to Kershaw Gardens into a free 48-hour camping area for self-sufficient travellers using recreational vehicles such as caravans and motorhomes. Strelow believed Kershaw Garden's close proximity to shops, restaurants, entertainment venues and other businesses would benefit the city.

The move was opposed by commercial caravan park operators, who said such use of Kershaw Gardens would have a negative impact on local caravan park businesses. Strelow disagreed, stating she believed that if free overnight accommodation wasn't provided, travellers would continue driving through the city rather than seek a caravan park.

The issue escalated when Caravan Parks Association of Queensland Ltd took Rockhampton Regional Council and the Queensland Government to the Planning and Environment Court in December 2017, submitting an application seeking to enforce the closure of the stopover point at Kershaw Gardens. The caravan association argued that establishing a stopover point at Kershaw Gardens was an unlawful use of the land.

In a judgement on 15 November 2018, the Planning and Environment Court ruled against Rockhampton Regional Council, stating that such use of Kershaw Gardens is unlawful and that they must abolish the free camping area by 15 February 2019. Rockhampton Regional Council was also instructed to remove any camping signage and advise the Campervan and Motorhome Club of Australia that camping is no longer permitted at Kershaw Gardens.

== Previous Incidents ==
=== Discovery of a bomb ===
A bomb was found at Kershaw Gardens in January 2000. Police described the device as professionally made by someone with a substantial amount of knowledge of explosives and electronics. Police said it had the potential to kill someone had it exploded when they picked it up. Explosives experts attended the scene and deactivated the bomb.

=== Discovery of human remains ===
In June 2000, two Rockhampton City Council workers discovered human remains when they found a skull while clearing debris in the wetlands area near the High Street entrance. Forensic testing confirmed the remains were that of Dale John (Johnny) Baker, who had disappeared in March 1985. No cause of death was able to be established and no one was charged despite the police believing Baker was possibly murdered.
