= F. Mark Wyatt =

American CIA agent

Felton Mark Wyatt (May 23, 1920 – June 29, 2006) was a CIA agent. He was raised in Woodland, California and graduated from the University of California, Berkeley in 1942. During World War II, he served as a communications officer on board of the destroyer "Conner" in the Pacific theater. After his war service in the US Navy he earned a degree in foreign affairs from George Washington University. He joined the CIA in 1948.

He married fellow CIA operative Ann Appleton Wyatt in 1951.

First posted to Italy, Wyatt delivered large sums of cash to Christian Democrat politicians as part a large-scale operation to sway the results of the 1948 election. This operation continued until at least 1972 (24 years). In 1964 Wyatt was appointed deputy chief of the Rome station. He also helped to set up the Italian branch of the anti-communist NATO stay behind network during the Mario Scelba prime ministry, after the Italians were initially left out.

In 1968–69 he worked with South Vietnamese intelligence services in Saigon. In 1970 Wyatt was posted to New York City to spy on the UN. He was posted chief of station in Luxembourg (1972–1975). After his career in the CIA, Wyatt assisted Soviet defectors to acclimate to life in the United States.

Wyatt was one of the few persons in the CIA who knew Arkady Shevchenko as a friend before his defection and also knew of Shevchenko's information given to the CIA for 2 1/2 years before the defection. After Shevchenko's defection, Aldrich Ames debriefed Shevchenko. Wyatt attended Shevchenko's United States citizenship ceremony.

In the later years of his life he split his time between Washington, D.C., during the year and Carnelian Bay, Lake Tahoe, in the summer.
