= Jim O'Regan (cricketer) =

Australian cricketer

Personal information
- Full name: James Bernard O'Regan
- Born: 23 April 1938; Sydney, Australia
- Died: 15 May 1998 (aged 60); Sydney, Australia
- Source: ESPNcricinfo, 13 January 2017

Jim O'Regan (23 April 1938 – 15 May 1998) was an Australian cricketer. He played six first-class matches for New South Wales in 1957/58.

== See also ==
- List of New South Wales representative cricketers
