= Wyatt F. Jeltz =

American educator, philanthropist and ethnographer

Wyatt F. Jeltz (1907–1975) was an American educator, philanthropist and ethnographer from Oklahoma City, Oklahoma, United States.

For many years Wyatt Jeltz was an assistant principal at Oklahoma City Douglass High School. Having no children, Wyatt and his wife Mattie willed their assets to establish the Jeltz Scholarship Foundation, now known as Wyatt F. Jeltz Memorial Scholarship Foundation (501(c)(3), total assets about 270,000 as of 2007 fiscal year). The foundation provides scholarships to assist successful full-time students enrolled in a state-supported Oklahoma accredited college in paying college-related expenses.

Jeltz is also acclaimed for his article "The Relations of Negroes and Choctaw and Chickasaw Indians", in which he argues that the treatment of slaves by the two Native American nations was similar to the practice of the whites in the Southern States.

Another tribute to his memory is the Wyatt F. Jeltz Senior Center in Oklahoma City, built in 1979.

Wyatt Jeltz was associated with the Oklahoma City Alumni chapter of Kappa Alpha Psi fraternity.
