= Dave Wyatt =

David Wyatt
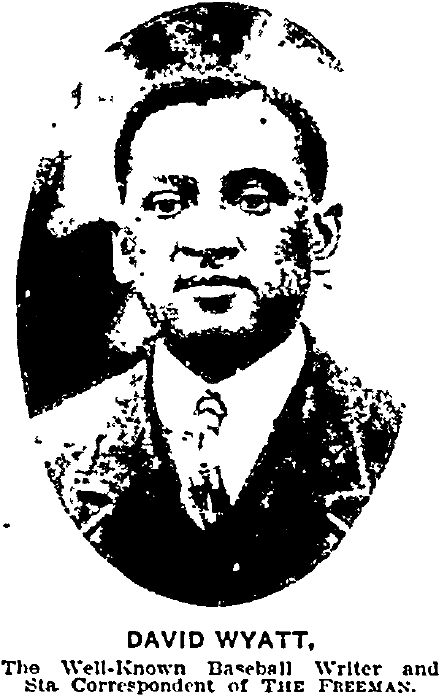
- Infielder / Manager
- Born: Nelsonville, Ohio, U.S.
- Batted: Unknown Threw: Unknown

debut
- 1898, for the Chicago Unions

Last appearance
- 1906, for the Leland Giants

Teams
- Chicago Unions (1898); Chicago Union Giants (1902–1903); Leland Giants (1906)

David Wyatt was born about June 19, 1871 in Nelsonville, Ohio and was an American Negro leagues infielder and manager for several years before the founding of the first Negro National League. He attended Indiana State University.

His earliest records show he played for the Hot Springs Arlingtons in 1897 and the Chicago Unions as early as 1898. He was present on team lists for the Chicago Unions in 1902 and 1903. And he played for the Leland Giants in 1906.

Wyatt made an appearance at a 1907 meeting at the Indianapolis Freeman Newspaper Building, where baseball club owners met to discuss a possible National Colored Base Ball League in 1908.

Wyatt managed the Illinois Giants by 1909.

Dave Wyatt died at the age of 78 on December 10, 1950 in Cook County, IL.
