= Ray Wyatt =

American car dealer and state legislator

James Ray Wyatt was an American car dealer and state legislator in Alabama. He served in the Alabama Senate and was a segregationist. He represented Alabama's Sixth Senatorial District.

Wyatt owned a Ford dealership in Pell City. He was involved in a land sale of property in northern St. Clair County, Alabama to Black Muslims that sparked controversy and protests. He was part of a lawsuit that sought to nullify the sale.

There is a Ray Wyatt Road in Ashville, Alabama in Saint Clair County.
