= Rockhampton Zoo =

Zoo in Queensland, Australia

- Interactive map of Rockhampton Zoo
- 23.397878°S 150.490753°E
- Date opened: 1925
- Location: 93 Spencer Street, The Range, Queensland
- No. of animals: 200+
- No. of species: 60+
- Website: www.rockhamptonregion.qld.gov.au/FacilitiesRecreation/Rockhampton-Zoo

Rockhampton Zoo is a zoo in the Australian city of Rockhampton, Queensland.

== Summary ==
The zoo is located within the grounds of the Rockhampton Botanic Gardens in the suburb of The Range. Animals on display at the zoo include chimpanzees, small-clawed otters, meerkats, koalas, wombats, red kangaroo, eastern grey kangaroos, dingoes, crocodiles, goannas, frilled-neck lizards, blotched blue-tongued lizards, boa constrictor, turtles, frogs and a variety of birdlife including wedge-tailed eagles, emus, southern cassowaries and macaws.

Zookeepers deliver talks and feed the animals at scheduled times during the day.

== Chimpanzee breeding program ==
The major drawcard at Rockhampton Zoo are the six resident chimpanzees, "Cassie", "Samantha", "Holly" "Leakey", "Alon" and "Capri".

Two male chimpanzees, named "Cassie" and "Ockie" arrived at the zoo in 1986.

A chimpanzee enclosure measuring just 200m2 was replaced in 2010 with a new 1000m2 enclosure featuring large glass viewing screens was constructed at a cost of $1.3millions. It was officially opened by Member for Rockhampton Robert Schwarten in March 2010. The decision to build the new enclosure came after the old cage no longer met Biosecurity Queensland standards.

The decision to replace the old chimpanzee enclosure with a much larger facility was supported by both the RSPCA and the WWF. The RSPCA said that although the organisation wasn't in favour of keeping animals in zoos, they did support any improvement to the enclosure at Rockhampton Zoo. The WWF said while the best way to save endangered animals was to protect the natural environment, they believed zoo breeding programs using best practice can play a role.

Two female chimpanzees, named "Samantha" and "Holly" arrived from Mogo Zoo in 2012, in the hope they would reproduce with the male chimpanzees as part of a proposed breeding program.

However, "Ockie" died from a heart condition in 2013.

Following the death of "Ockie", the chimpanzees were studied by University of Queensland psychologist who observed changes to the social order between them.

A male chimpanzee and a female chimpanzee, named "Alon" and "Leakey", arrived at the zoo from Israel in 2015.

In February 2018, "Leakey" gave birth to a female chimpanzee, fathered by "Alon". It's believed to have been the first baby chimpanzee to have been born in Queensland since the 1970s.

The baby chimpanzee was eventually named "Capri", nominated by a Yeppoon family as an homage to her place of birth - the Tropic of Capricorn on which Rockhampton sits in a region often referred to as Capricornia.

The birth of "Capri" is part of an Australian and New Zealand breeding program aiming to increase the number of chimpanzees from 51 to 80 over twenty years.

== Notable events ==
A Southern hairy-nosed wombat called "Fatso" gave birth in 2008.

Three two-week-old dingo puppies were donated to Rockhampton Zoo in 2009 where they were hand-reared.

In 2012, a cassowary chick was born at Rockhampton Zoo after an egg successfully hatched.

A new koala called "Lleyton" arrived from Currumbin Wildlife Sanctuary on the Gold Coast in September 2013.

A 4.5 metre crocodile, weighing 570 kilograms, was delivered to Rockhampton Zoo from Koorana Crocodile Farm in September 2014. The crocodile, known as "The Colonel", was lifted into the crocodile enclosure by crane to live with two adult and five juvenile freshwater crocodiles.

Two Asian short-clawed otters called "Soa" and "Houdini" arrived from Taronga Zoo in late 2014. Rockhampton Zoo expressed interest in working with international experts to ensure the longevity of the vulnerable species with the hope of eventually establishing a breeding program.

== Security concerns ==
Concerns have arisen a number of times over the years about the zoo's security at night due to a number of overnight incidents at the zoo which has resulted in the death, injury and theft of animals.

- 2004: Three emus were deliberately killed in January 2004, leaving zookeepers in shock.
- 2005: A kangaroo was decapitated in July 2005, prompting the RSPCA to encourage anyone with information to come forward.
- 2006: In March 2006, a 1.2 metre crocodile was stolen from the zoo. It was reported the thieves responsible initially attempted to steal a koala but opted to steal a crocodile after the koala became aggressive. However, Rockhampton City Council's Parks & Gardens director Tom Wyatt was unable to confirm this. Local police also wouldn't substantiate claims that the crocodile was stolen and sold on for drugs money and said there was no known motive for the theft. 24-year-old Douglas White was sentenced to six months jail after pleading guilty to the theft of the crocodile along with a number of unrelated charges. Despite the suggestion the crocodile had been sold on, White told the court he had given it to a friend who had returned it to a local lagoon several days after the theft.
- 2017: 22-year-old Alex Michael Cope was convicted and fined $300 after pleading guilty to one count of trespass after breaking into Rockhampton Zoo while drunk in April 2017 where he climbed into the crocodile enclosure and placed his hand in the water, where it was subsequently bitten by a crocodile. Cope entered a police station several days later to enquire about his mobile phone which he had dropped at the zoo while escaping.
