= George Wyatt House =

Historic house in Massachusetts, United States

- U.S. National Register of Historic Places
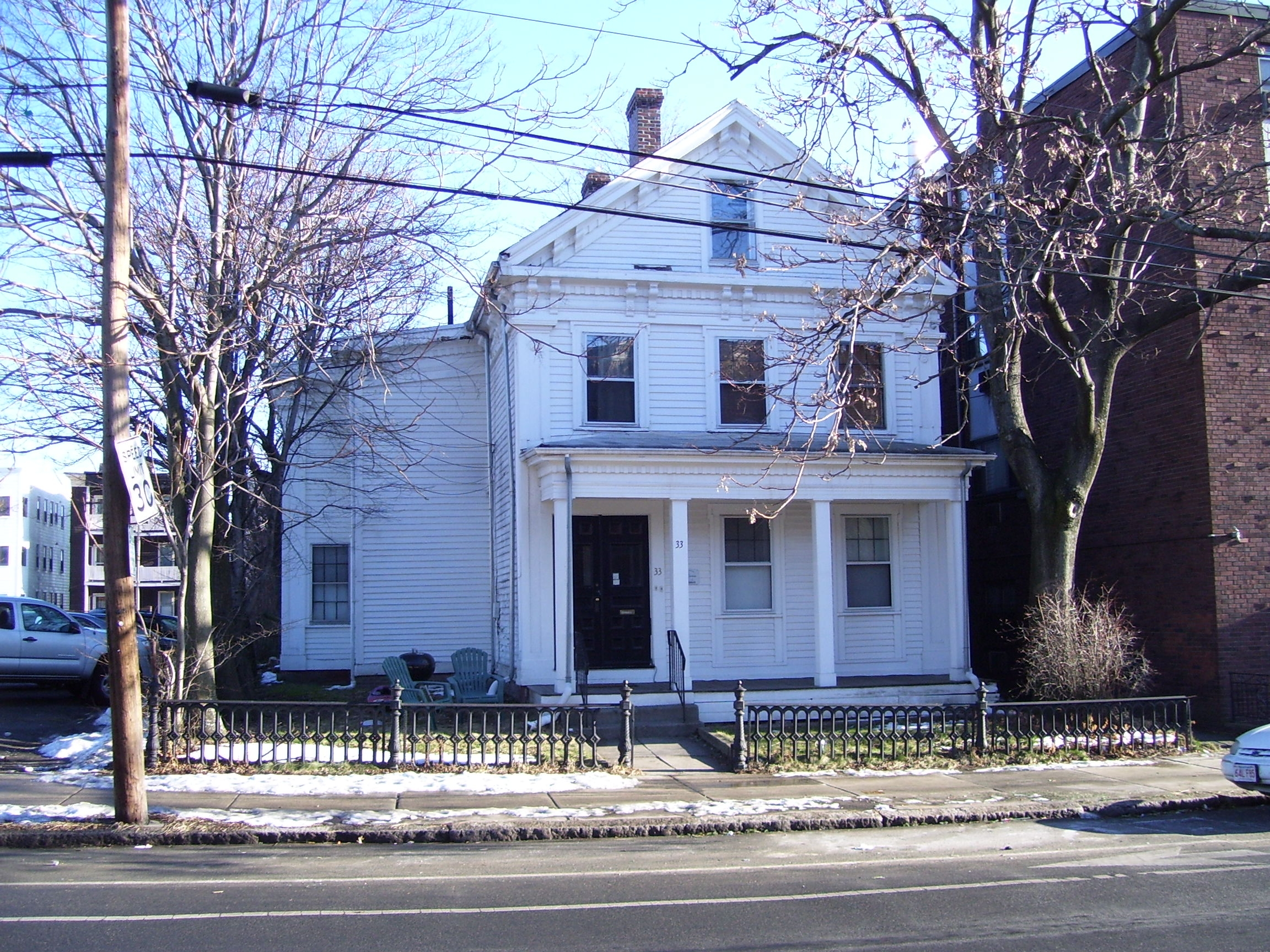

- Location within Massachusetts Location within the United States
- Location: 33 Beacon Street, Somerville, Massachusetts
- Coordinates: 42°22′31.45″N 71°6′9.41″W
- Built: 1860
- Architectural style: Italianate
- MPS: Somerville MPS
- NRHP reference No.: 89001233
- Added to NRHP: September 18, 1989

The George Wyatt House is a historic house in Somerville, Massachusetts, near Inman Square. The 2 1/2-story wood-frame house was built c. 1860 for George Wyatt, owner of one of Somerville's successful 19th century brickyards, which was located just north of this property. The house is an excellent example of a three bay, side entry Italianate style house, with a deep gable studded with paired decorative brackets and molded window surrounds.

The house was listed on the National Register of Historic Places in 1989.

== See also ==
- National Register of Historic Places listings in Somerville, Massachusetts
