= Provincial Newspapers (QLD) Ltd =

Australian regionally-based newspaper

Provincial Newspapers (QLD) Ltd. (PNQ) was a regionally-based newspaper publishing enterprise established in Queensland, Australia on 1 April 1968, lasting for 20 years until it was taken over in 1988 by Australian Provincial Newspapers.

PNQ was created through the amalgamation of six privately owned, regionally-based Queensland newspaper companies which represented multiple generations of family control since 1861. PNQ is recognised as the world's 'oldest continuously owned newspaper proprietorship, stretching over five generations.'

Prior to the formation of the PNQ conglomerate, six Queensland families: the Mannings; Irwins; Dunns; Parkinsons; Stephensons; and Kippens owned several regional newspaper empires, with their combined circulation area stretching from Toowoomba in south-east Queensland to Mackay in central Queensland, spanning the period from 1861 to 1968. The PNQ was an alliance of these established newspaper dynasties designed to expand the families' business interests, limit unhelpful competition and protect locally published newspapers from metropolitan competition and multinational take-overs. At the time of formation, the companies published six dailies and a weekly newspaper. Between 1968 and 1988 the company expanded its publishing activities to include nine daily newspapers in Queensland and four in New South Wales.

The knock-on effect of an Australian government determination that News Limited, through its purchase of the Herald and Weekly Times which in turn owned a significant proportion of PNQ shares, could not control both the major capital city newspaper, The Courier-Mail, plus a majority of country newspapers, meant that PNQ was bought by the Irish media company Haswell Pty Ltd on 26 July 1988, and then onsold on 2 November 1988 to Australian Provincial News and Media Limited Corporation, a subsidiary of APN News & Media Ltd (APN).

== History and Family Involvement ==
From 1968 to 1988, PNQ published local, national and international news through a range of daily, weekly and periodic newspapers in regional areas of Queensland aiming to 'keep readers in touch with the world as well as the local community.' Country newspapers operated in a different readership environment to their metropolitan counterparts. PNQ's newspapers focused on the local communities in which their newspapers were distributed. The popularity of its newspapers was reflected in the loyalty of the town-based readership which appreciated the availability of local news reporting, community interest editorials and a strong personal allegiance to a home-grown enterprise.

=== The Dunn Family ===
The Dunns owned or part-owned newspapers in the Queensland country towns of Maryborough, Rockhampton, Toowoomba, Nambour, and Bundaberg. It was the most influential family in the PNQ conglomerate.

Andrew Dunn (Senior) (1854–1934 ) was born on 24 May 1854 at Greenock, Scotland. In 1879, Dunn married Kate McIntyre and the couple arrived in Queensland in 1880. They had five sons, one of whom died in infancy. The remaining four later played integral roles in the family's newspaper business. Kate Dunn died in 1889, at the age of 34.

On 18 November 1891, Dunn married his second wife, Jane Cran. Together the couple had four children, two sons and two daughters. The sons of this marriage were also involved in the family newspaper trade. Dunn and his wife worked amicably as a ‘power couple’ and Jane was noted as an '... astute adviser in business affairs.' Encouraged by the already well-established newspaper dynasties of the time, Dunn had his family trained in newspaper industry practices. Dunn's participation in the community extended beyond his involvement in the newspaper business, and in 1903 and 1914 Dunn served as the mayor of Maryborough.

In 1911, using the profits generated by The Chronicle, the Dunn family expanded their enterprise by acquiring the controlling interest in the Rockhampton Morning Bulletin. Dunn employed his children, Andrew Dunn Jr. and Herbert Dunn, in managerial positions within his provincial publications.

The Dunn family soon realised that their provincial newspapers could not survive in a region so close to a metropolitan area, where the newspaper industry was more technologically advanced. This realisation led to their merger of The Warwick Argus with the Irwin family's Examiner & 'Times. This resulted, on 1 February 1919, in Andrew Dunn becoming the '...man who initiated the first chain of major provincial newspapers in Queensland.’ These families also merged the Widebay and Burnett News and the Maryborough Chronicle.

Andrew Dunn's second wife, Jane Dunn, died on 14 August 1930 and he later married the head of the Queensland Country Press Association (QCPA), Ms. Marcella Heller Foote. The couple had no children. Andrew Dunn senior died on 29 April 1934.

==== William Herbert Dunn ====
William Herbert Dunn (1883–1961) was born on 11 September 1883 in Toowoomba. Herbert Dunn was known for ‘install[ing] dictaphones to take copy by telephone from the Country Press Association’s news service in Brisbane.' He was managing director of the Toowoomba enterprises from 1922 to 1951 and died on 4 April 1961.

=== The Irwin family ===
The Irwin family had a long standing involvement in the Warwick press. Three generations of the family were active over 101 years.

Samuel John Irwin (1838-1909) was born in Newtown, Limavady, Ireland. In 1841, the Irwin family emigrated to the United States of America where Samuel Irwin lived for approximately 28 years before arriving by boat in Brisbane on 26 June 1866. Irwin worked for The Queensland Times, Ipswich, before moving to Warwick to assist in launching a rival paper called the Examiner & Times on 15 February 1867. Irwin was a compositor during the early years of the newspaper and later formed a partnership with Richard Appleby Cowton. This partnership lasted until Cowton’s death in 1891 with Cowton taking major responsibility for the paper. Irwin was a competent printer and businessman. However, he spent the majority of his time developing his vineyards, rather than improving his journalistic skills. After Cowton’s death, Irwin appointed Harry Sterne as the editor of the Examiner & Times. In 1899, Irwin bought out the Cowton family’s remaining interest in the publication.

On 23 December 1878, Samuel Irwin married Matilda Jane Boyd at the Presbyterian Church in Toowoomba. They had four sons and two daughters. Three of Irwin’s sons continued in the family business, Samuel Boyd ("S.B. Irwin") (1879–1933), William John Boyd ("W.J.B.") (1885–1958), and James (1887–1966).

On 28 July 1909, Samuel Irwin died, leaving the business to his wife and family. Matilda Irwin became the proprietor, with her eldest son, Samuel, becoming manager and Sterne remaining as the editor. In 1919, the Irwins’ merged the Examiner with the Argus, which had been purchased in 1914 by the Dunns, to form the Warwick Daily News. S.B. Irwin became associate editor, brother William took charge of the printing side and James ran the commercial printing section’. S.B. Irwin later became editor of the Warwick Daily News but resigned in 1926 after he was unable to get his brother's support for paying award wages as the editor. W.J.B. Irwin became the next editor of Warwick Daily News, a position he held until 1945. ‘The Irwins worked with the Dunns till 1936 when they bought back the Dunns’ controlling interest for 7500 pounds.’ W.J.B. Irwin then became the chairman of directors, and held the position until his death on 3 November 1958. James Irwin was then appointed chairman and held this position until his death on 20 October 1966. James’ son, Lyle, then became chairman until his death on 14 February 1972. This was not the last family connection with the company, however, Edwin Hollingworth, husband of Mary Irwin, daughter of W.J.B. Irwin, became the company's business manager on 1 January 1946 and the managing director in 1962. Hollingworth was appointed to the PNQ board in 1962 acting on behalf of the Irwins. His son, Robert Paul, assumed managerial control in 1979. Robert Paul was the third and final chief executive of PNQ and was the fourth generation of Irwins to be involved.

=== The Manning family ===
The Manning family was active in Gympie, Gladstone, and Mackay.

William Joseph "W.J." Manning (1864–1943) was born in Eden, Twofold Bay, New South Wales. His parents relocated to Brisbane when he was three but soon moved to Gympie following the gold rush. Manning left school two months before his 14th birthday. At the behest of his parents, he reluctantly started a printing apprenticeship at the Gympie Times on 1 April 1878. By the age of 21, Manning had completed his apprenticeship and moved to Brisbane to start work on Figaro, a ‘bright glossy weekly.’ Manning married Charlotte Emma Black in 1888 and in 1889, they were expecting their first child. In the same year, Manning successfully applied for the role of manager for The Observer (Gladstone). After only one year as manager, William Manning purchased the remaining interests from William Peel Mellefont's widow and brother to become proprietor and editor of The Observer (Gladstone). He held this role for over 20 years. W.J.'s son, Henry John ("Jack") Manning, was born in Gladstone on 6 August 1889. Jack's eventual involvement in the newspaper trade was to span 70 years.

W.J. Manning was an influential member of the Gladstone community. He was Mayor in 1897, 1898 and 1901. In 1910, Manning visited Mackay to purchase equipment for the Port Curtis Dairy Factory, just one of the many organisations in which he held the chairman's position. During his time in Mackay, he noticed the office of the Daily Mercury and enquired whether the newspaper was for sale. Manning purchased 2200 shares from A.F. Williams, with Williams resigning on 24 April 1910. Manning took over as managing editor selling the profitable The Observer (Gladstone) to John Henry Kessell. He moved his family to Mackay to run the struggling Daily Mercury. Less than one year after his appointment as managing editor of the Daily Mercury, at a salary of 400 pounds a year, Manning became managing director. In 1917, Manning became the chairman of directors and, by 1924, the Manning family had become proprietors of the publication.

Manning was devoted to the Daily Mercury and the Mackay district, investing all his savings to that end. The news columns in the Daily Mercury were known to be ‘balanced and straightforward’ as Manning would never permit news to be ‘coloured with animosities.’ ‘Despite the editorial, managerial, and proprietorial demands at the Daily Mercury, W.J. Manning maintained a close and active interest in numerous organisations’ alongside local and state politics. In 1918, Manning unsuccessfully stood against the State Member for Mackay, William Forgan Smith.

The Daily Mercury was successful under Manning's control. On 27 July 1932, shareholders agreed to privately register the company and changed its name to Mackay Printing and Publishing Company (Pty.) Ltd. It also bought 50 per cent of Radio 4MK, Mackay's first radio broadcasting service. In 1937, Manning became the director and licensee of the radio station.

Manning's wife, Charlotte, died on 10 October 1938 and Manning relinquished editorial control of the Daily Mercury, appointing H.A. Moore as editor. Manning remained the chairman of directors and managers, and secretariat until his death on 24 April 1943.

==== Henry John Manning ====
Henry John "Jack" Manning (1889–1978), son of William Joseph Manning, was born on 6 August 1889. He was educated at Gladstone State School and the Normal School, Brisbane. He undertook a printer's apprenticeship before training as a cadet journalist for The Observer (Gladstone). After his father became principal shareholder of the Daily Mercury in 1910 he had the opportunity to work in the composing room, and as a reporter, sub-editor, gradually preparing for a managerial role.

He married Alison Morcom on 21 March 1916. They had two children, one of whom, Clarence Morcom "Clarrie" Manning (1917 – n.d.), played an integral role in the development of PNQ. Clarrie believed the success of the Daily Mercury was due to W.J. Manning's three-pronged plan to modernised the plant, invest money into the newspaper, and employ the right people. Clarence Manning married and had two sons and three daughters. In 1918, Jack became the business manager for the Daily Mercury. He also held other notable positions. He was a board member of the QCPA, becoming chairman in 1934 and holding that position for 43 years. He became the President of the QCPA (Queensland Country Press Association) in 1928 and held this position for two years. In 1936, he became involved with the Australian Provincial Daily Press, serving over 40 years on the body's central board. Manning served on several other community organisations and, in 1953, was appointed to the Order of the British Empire (OBE). In 1956, Manning's wife died, and two years later he remarried the widow Edith Agnes Lynch née Clarkson . In 1958, he retired to Buderim, Queensland and died 10 October 1978.

Manning supported the proposed merger of the Manning, Dunn and Irwin family interests in regional papers as he saw that this merger would ‘prevent predatory metropolitan companies from buying up country newspapers one by one.’ In 1968, Provincial Newspapers (QLD) Ltd was formed.

=== The Parkinsons, Stephensons and Kippens ===
Three other families had notable connections to PNQ: the Stephensons, Parkinsons, and Kippens. These families controlled the Ipswich-based The Queensland Times at the time of the merger which created PNQ. These families had ties to the newspaper industry lasting more than a century.

In 1861, Hugh Parkinson (1828–1909 ) and two fellow workers employed at the North Australian, Ipswich, had the opportunity to purchase a rival paper, The Ipswich Herald. On 8 October 1861, they took control of the newly named The Queensland Times. Parkinson had previously been foreman printer on the North Australian but became the senior partner at The Queensland Times. 'The Parkinsons maintained direct representation in the partnership from 1861 till the PNQ merger and direct employment links till 1976.'

Alfred John Stephenson (1846–1914) had experience as a composing room employee. However at The Queensland Times he became its managing director, a position he held for more than 45 years. Alfred Stephenson was an influential member of the Ipswich community. He was the mayor of Ipswich in 1907. Following in his father's footsteps, Alfred Tully Stephenson (1872–1938) ) worked in the newspaper industry and was mayor of Ipswich in: 1912, 1914, 1921–1929, and 1933–1938. A further two generations of Stephensons worked at The Queensland Times. Their representation, which began in 1861, ended in 1975 when Gregory Stephenson resigned as editor.

The Kippen family had commercial ties to The Queensland Times from 1862–1980. Their family representation ended when Norol Devon Kippen (1915–n.d.) retired as deputy editor.

== Success of PNQ ==
The Dunn, Manning and Irwin family dynasties were critical to the operations of PNQ and 'worked together harmoniously and profitably for nigh on a generation' to ensure the success of the newspaper empire.

Prior to the PNQ amalgamation, Andrew Dunn - the ‘man who initiated the first chain of provincial newspapers in Queensland’ - implemented three fundamental principles to ‘guarantee’ the success of the PNQ merger. The three principles were established to ‘ensure’ protection from the expected metropolitan newspaper takeover attempts. They were:

1. That any organisation set up must ensure as far as possible that the present independence of the provincial press was maintained and consolidated;
2. That any organisation set up must as far as possible, consistent with other principles, preserve the status quo especially in regard to families; and
3. That any organisation set up must be such that listing of at least part of the shares on the Stock Exchange was possible in the immediate future.

By following these principles, PNQ was successful for several years in providing an integral public service to regional Queensland by offering a free press that attempted to reflect the community conscience. The publication of community interest stories, a focus on regional policies and societal advancement within the regional publications secured a following and the close involvement of their community audiences.

Financial success followed the establishment of the PNQ enterprise moving from an 'annual net profit [of] $317,000 in 1968 to $681,000 in 1975, $1,919,000 in 1980, $4,510,000 in 1985. In 1987–88, its final year of operation as PNQ, the profit was $4 million.

== PNQ’S Day-To-Day Operations ==
There were three key functions involved in the day-to-day operations of the PNQ which were central to comprehending the inner workings of this organisation: news collecting and reporting, newspaper formatting and production and the physical distribution and circulation of these newspapers. Additionally, these three functions provided the context within which to consider, and the reasons behind, many family newspaper dynasties amalgamating to form Queensland's largest provincial newspaper group, PNQ, in 1968.

In the pre-digital age, collection and reporting of local area news, commercial and event-based information, together with national and international news, provided the necessary impetus for local newspaper creation in response to a strong local consumer demand. However, to enable timely and cost-effective newspaper production and distribution, each local newspaper's content, format and print run was constrained by the availability of local skilled labour and the production ability of its news presses. These matters influenced broadsheet column sizes, the amount of local news covered, heading sizes, use of tables, the spacing and layout of each newspaper, together with the number of pages in each edition.

They also impacted upon the importance of wire services as a source of news content for the newspapers. Ultimately, these factors led to provincial newspapers being local business endeavours focused on local areas and regions. It also resulted in the development of these provincial newspapers being a ‘parasitic press’ as local newspapers would ‘cling to’ the news content provided by the more established, and broader-based, metropolitan press newspapers and ‘district correspondents’ as a key source for the latest information, news and gossip. This 'scissors-and-paste-pot journalism,' often occurred within PNQ's newspapers. It enabled mainstream and relatively up-to-date news to be distributed to a diverse, widespread and sparse readership in the State of Queensland.

Simultaneously, provincial newspapers such as The Toowoomba Chronicle, The Maryborough Chronicle and Rockhampton's The Morning Bulletin also reported on, and reflected, the interests and concerns of the local townspeople as they were, by far, the target audience for the relevant newspaper. Matters covered included important period events such as the gold rush, the separation of Queensland from New South Wales and the establishment of a separate state in the Federation, the commercial development of their particular region and the State as a whole. Strong local news content was considered essential to maintaining regional demand for these newspapers. As a consequence of adopting both an immediate and far-ranging news focus, provincial newspapers became a vital factor in the development of local life and community. Circulation figures for these provincial newspapers attested to the success of the papers. For example, on 30 September 1970, The Chronicle sold 17,865 newspapers, The Maryborough Chronicle sold 8,143 newspapers and The Morning Bulletin sold 21,275 newspapers. Between 1960 and 1990, the readership for The Chronicle increased 75.53%, The Morning Bulletin increased 32.17% and the Maryborough Chronicle increased 29.51% with the percentage home-delivered being between 45 and 50% for these three newspapers.

Provincial newspaper publishing was more than just the consideration of advertising copy flows, the layout dummy, and methods of selling advertising, newspaper distribution and deadlines. Local newspaper publishers were acutely aware that they were in the business of deriving newspaper sales revenue and advertising revenue from the local promotion of goods and services to 'target all members of the community's families.' For example, The Toowoomba Chronicle had a 'Children's Page' in every Tuesday edition to cater for younger readers within their potential audience. It also provided a comprehensive review for those older readers interested in local social gatherings and events. Each newspaper publisher had to balance the cost of news reporting, together with newspaper collation, printing and distribution on the one hand, with its ability to obtain higher circulation numbers and to charge a higher price for newspaper advertising on the other. Accordingly, provincial newspaper publishing provided a broader view of the complexities of the journalistic craft beyond Rudyard Kipling's 'who', 'what', 'why', 'when', 'where' and 'how.'

Ultimately, changes in technology, capital requirements, competition and changing consumer tastes led to a number of provincial newspapers amalgamating to form PNQ in 1968. They were then better able to compete with more nationally focused newspapers and other information media (such as television) that could be more cost effectively accessed by consumers. As a result of the provincial newspaper amalgamation, PNQ's management were more able to combat the existing and emerging competition and to profitably expand its newspaper businesses. For example, intense competition between The Toowoomba Chronicle and The Darling Downs Star between 1955 and 1970 resulted in The Darling Downs Star being eventually taken over by The Chronicle.

== Competition ==
One way competing newspapers challenged other publications for readership dominance by increasing the frequency of their publication, moving from biweekly to triweekly and perhaps to daily publishing. However, as one paper adopted this tactic, other papers had to eventually follow in order to maintain their business share. For example, from 30 June 1863, the Rockhampton Bulletin, moved to publishing triweekly issues, appearing on Tuesdays, Thursdays and Saturdays, to counter the emergence of The Argus which eventually followed the Bulletin from 6 February 1865, appearing on Mondays, Wednesdays and Saturdays.

Profitable Queensland newspaper dynasties were able to support separate enterprises in the one region from the late nineteenth century until the First World War. However, 'these competitors, as a rule, followed one another in price changes and in stepping up their frequency of publication through biweekly issue to daily status. Within a decade of the end of the war, many of them had either merged with their rivals or ceased publication with the realisation that advertising revenue had not expanded to keep pace with the sharp increase in production costs. Only one paper could make a comfortable living.'

Kirkpatrick, the major historian of the regional Queensland newspaper industry observes that 'Competition tended to survive longer in centers far removed from Brisbane.' This is most evident in the towns listed below:

=== Maryborough (Wide Bay and Burnett) ===
In 1860–61, the Wide Bay and Burnett area quickly developed and prospered leading to the demand for provincial newspapers in the region.

The Maryborough Chronicle was first published in 1860, running triweekly until 1890 and then distributed on a daily basis. Within a year of its commencement, The Chronicle met competition in the form of the Maryborough Mail which commenced weekly publication in 1861. Subsequently, The Tribune commenced weekly publication in 1869. Then, in 1870, Wide Bay and Burnett News commenced triweekly publication, with The Colonist starting weekly publication in 1884.

=== Toowoomba ===
In July 1861, in opposition to Toowoomba's original newspaper, the Darling Downs Gazette, a second journal, The Chronicle, was published providing an opposing political voice on local affairs.

=== Rockhampton ===
In July 1861, The Bulletin was published for the Rockhampton area and its success led to Rockhampton overtaking Maryborough as the key provincial newspaper centre. 'The Bulletin promised to present full and late details of all events of local interest, with digests of foreign news to be given on the arrival of the mails.’ There was no telegraph to Rockhampton. Correspondents had been appointed in neighboring districts and from throughout the colonies. However, by January 1863, Rockhampton had its second newspaper, the Daily Northern Argus which succeeded a short-lived comic paper, Punch, which originated in July 1862.

In 1865, Rockhampton's third journal, The News was established. However, the Queensland economic depression of 1866-67 resulted in the closure of this newspaper together with other newspapers in neighbouring towns.

=== Warwick ===
The establishment of Warwick’s first newspaper, The Mail, was delayed until September 1862 due to the lack of 'cohesion in the business community.' There was strong rivalry between competing provincial newspapers owned by the Morgan and the Irwin families who '…were on opposite sides of the fence in the Warwick newspaper world and on many political issues for nearly half a century. In the manner of the times, the Argus and the Examiner sniped at one another constantly in their editorial columns.' This battle continued until James Morgan bought The Argus from the Irwin family.

=== Bowen ===
As overlanders began to bypass Rockhampton, Bowen became a main trading centre with newspaper demand ultimately resulting in the creation of The Port Denison Times in March 1864.

=== Nashville (Gympie) ===
In February 1868, The Nashville Times was first published as a ‘biweekly to serve the fortune-hunting thousands who had swarmed to the Gympie Creek gold diggings.’ As the neighbouring towns of Clermont and Nashville were developed with a mining focus, these two towns were the ‘exception … to the rule of development inspired by pastoral expansion.’

=== Townsville (Cleveland Bay) ===
The continued expansion of Queensland frontiers led to the establishment of Townsville's first newspaper, The Cleveland Bay Express, in 1866. Later in 1876, The Townsville Herald was introduced and The Northern Standard soon followed.

=== Mackay ===
In April 1866, Mackay's first journal, The Mackay Mercury, was established and published on a bi-weekly basis. The Mackay Standard commenced publication in 1877 on a weekly basis.

=== Ipswich ===
In 1855, The North Australian was first published in Ipswich and appeared weekly for four years before facing competition in the area. The Ipswich Herald was introduced to Ipswich in 1859 and also ran weekly. In 1861, both newspapers merged into one, being renamed The Queensland Times, which was first published on 8 October 1861.

=== Gladstone ===
In January 1868, Gladstone produced its first newspaper, The Observer (Gladstone). It was not until 18 years later that The Observer (Gladstone) faced competition from the Gladstone Advocate in 1886. Both newspapers were published biweekly.

== Demise of PNQ ==
The geographic location of Queensland provincial newspapers, with their comparatively limited regional readership, ultimately meant that they were unable to effectively compete in the wider Australian media sphere. Swift developments in technology revolutionised newspaper production and distribution in the mid- to late-20th century led to metropolitan newspapers gaining increasingly wide circulation, thereby reducing the demand for provincial newspapers.

In his analysis of the demise of the PNQ Kirkpatrick discusses some of the strategies 'dying' newspapers had attempted, largely to no longer term avail, in a bid to maintain, if not to increase, their readership. These included home delivery, community involvement and reader competitions. The overall decline in newspaper circulation can be attributed to various factors including the impact of television and online newspapers, increasing 'cover prices' and 'free newspapers.'

Other stresses faced by PNQ included internal disagreements about strategic directions alongside nepotistic and unwise managerial appointments within PNQ which meant that later generation Dunn, Manning and Irwin families 'lack[ed] the knowledge of, and desire to indulge in, the tactics of the competitive media world.' As Kirkpatrick notes, the 'financial interests of the families in the company had steadily been eroded over the years', with the fourth generation PNQ members 'lacking the degree of interest, drive and dynamism in being involved in the newspaper industry that the first, second and (some of the) third generations had exhibited.'

The changing dynamic of the provincial newspaper publishing business on a number of levels alongside the rise of multinational corporations such as News Limited building massive business portfolios contributed to the pressures that such family owned and operated newspapers were under.

== Primary source ==
Dr. Rod Kirkpatrick's research on the history of the Queensland provincial press is the primary reference source used in this article. As a former provincial daily newspaper editor, and now academic, Kirkpatrick has dedicated a significant part of his life to writing a history of the national provincial daily press. He is both well-qualified and entitled to be considered as an accurate and unbiased source.

== PNQ holdings ==
- Bundaberg News Mail
- Caboolture Paper
- Caloundra Weekly
- Chinchilla News and Murilla Advertiser
- Daily Mercury
- Gladstone Observer
- Gympie Times
- Maryborough Chronicle
- Nambour Chronicle
- Noosa News
- Queensland Times (Ipswich)
- Rockhampton Morning Bulletin
- Warwick Daily News
