= Bulletin Building, Rockhampton =

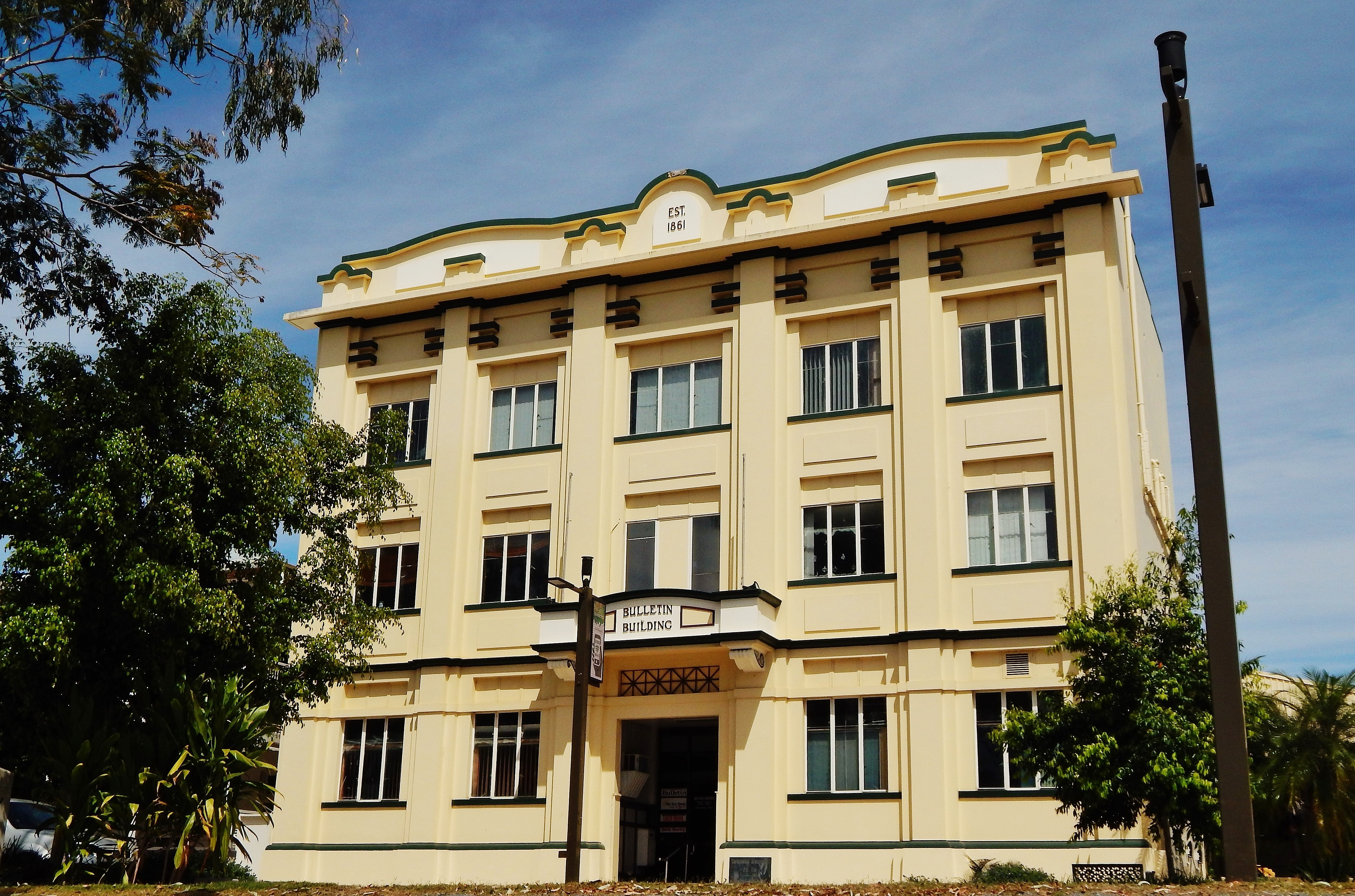
- Bulletin Building, 2017

- Location within Queensland Location within Australia
- 23.3766°S 150.5134°E
- Location: 162–164 Quay Street, Rockhampton, Queensland, Australia

History
- Design period: 1919–1930s (interwar period)
- Built: 1926

Site notes
- Architect: Roy Chipps
- Architectural style: Stripped Classicism
- Owner: Bevan Slattery

Queensland Heritage Register
- Official name: Bulletin Building
- Type: state heritage (built)
- Designated: 5 December 2005
- Reference no.: 601582
- Significant period: 1920s (fabric); 1927–ongoing (historical use)
- Significant components: machinery/plant/equipment – communications
- Builders: R Cousins & Company

Bulletin Building is a heritage-listed printing house at 162–164 Quay Street, Rockhampton, Queensland, Australia. It was designed by Roy Chipps and built in 1926 by R Cousins & Company. It was added to the Queensland Heritage Register on 5 December 2005.

== History ==
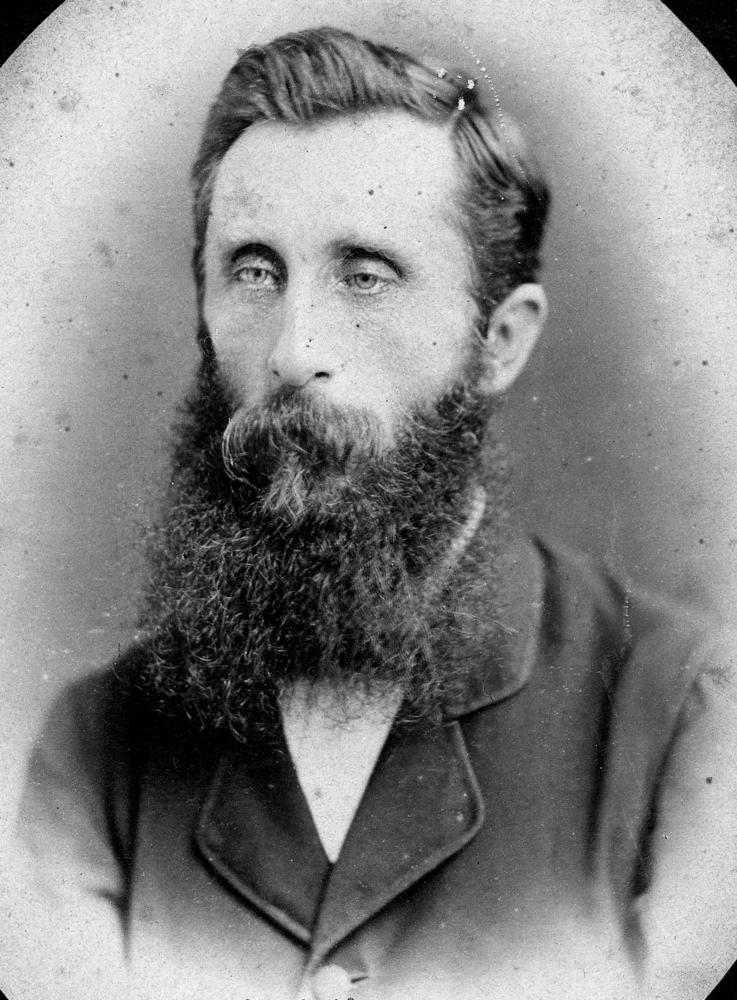
Charles Hardie Buzacott, 1879

Constructed in 1926, the Bulletin Building was built by R Cousins & Company, to a design by prominent Rockhampton architect, Roy Chipps. A purpose-built newspaper office, the Bulletin Building was constructed when an earlier building on site was demolished. Established in 1861, The Morning Bulletin remains as Rockhampton's oldest newspaper.

The Morning Bulletin earned a dominating position among the city's press is largely due to a long line of distinguished editors beginning with its founder William Hitchcock Buzacott and his brother, Charles Hardie Buzacott between 1861 and 1880. From 1880 and 1911, William McIlwraith and John Blair were the proprietors of the newspaper. In 1911, McIlwraith and Blair were followed by three generations of the Dunn family company, who carried the Bulletin into the modern age and the subsequent competition of electronic media.

Since 1861 the Bulletin's only name changes has been the dropping of "Northern Queensland Advertiser" from the title and in 1873 its emergence as the Morning Bulletin.

The original home of The Morning Bulletin was in Quay Street near the Customs House in a timber building owned by John Ward. On 14 August 1862 the Bulletin office burnt down and the presses destroyed. Following the destruction of the first building by fire, the office of The Morning Bulletin was moved to a two-storeyed masonry building in Denham Street.

The popularity of The Morning Bulletin was such that, from 1873, it began the new year as a daily newspaper. It was the first daily paper, outside of Brisbane, issued in Queensland.

Following the death of WH Buzacott in 1880, William McIlwraith became the owner of the Morning Bulletin. In 1883, McIlwraith was joined in partnership by John Blair.

It was during McIlwraith's ownership, in the early 1880s when, with increases in the local population and the circulation of the paper, the Denham Street building became too small to house the growing staff. At this time, the office was moved to a building in East Street. It was from this office in East Street that a larger office in Quay Street was planned in the mid-1920s.

On 20 December 1910, John Blair died suddenly in Rockhampton. By 11 March 1911, a new era had begun for The Morning Bulletin, following Andrew Dunn Snr's purchase of the newspaper form William McIlwraith. Dunn's son, also Andrew, had joined The Morning Bulletin in 1905. Dunn's employment with the newspaper began a long association which was to last 43 years. Dunn Jnr took over as Managing-Editor of the Morning Bulletin following his father's purchase of the newspaper in 1911.

Dunn is credited with making The Morning Bulletin and The Capricornian more modern in the sense that there was provided to the reader more popular articles and after several years, a series of articles by staff members using pseudonyms.

It was during the Dunn family's ownership of The Morning Bulletin that new offices were constructed along Quay Street. The new address of The Morning Bulletin became 162–164 Quay Street from 1927.

The architect commissioned to design the new building for The Morning Bulletin was Roy Chipps. Chipps trained as an architect in New South Wales, moving to Brisbane in 1917 to commence an architectural practice, forming a partnership with CH Griffin from 1919 to 1922. In 1923, following a move to Rockhampton, Chipps established a thriving practice which operated until 1936, when he was joined in partnership by WC Nichols. Chipps became a non-resident partner in the practice until it dissolved in 1939. The Chipps designed building remains as the office of The Morning Bulletin.

Capricornia Newspapers Pty Ltd, an Australian Provincial Newspapers subsidiary purchased the property in December 1976.

Australian Provincial Newspapers is a media company that consists of three divisions - Newspaper, Outdoor Advertising and Radio. The Newspaper division publishes more than 65 titles in northern New South Wales and south and central Queensland. Australian Provincial Newspapers owns a number of newspapers from Mackay to Coffs Harbour along the eastern coastline, and inland to Emerald, Biloela, Ipswich, Toowoomba, Warwick, Lismore, Grafton and Chinchilla. The Capricornia Newspapers subsidiary owns Gladstone's The Observer, Yeppoon's Capricorn Coast Mirror, Emerald's Central Queensland News, and Biloela's Central Telegraph.

In May 1992, Australian Provincial Newspapers offered shares to the public through the Australian Securities Exchange, believing that the public should own their local newspaper. It was expected that this would raise and additional $80 million in revenue - this figure was well exceeded due to public demand. The funds have been earmarked for payment of existing debts and to allow for expansion of operations in their various plants, updating of computers and other facilities.

The Morning Bulletin currently employs about 165 staff, including casual staff. The composing areas, production and editorial staff rotate between day and night shifts. Currently, the Morning Bulletin has a circulation of approximately 20,000 on weekdays and 26,500 on Saturdays.

The Harris Web press, installed approximately 25 years ago, is the press utilised by Australian Provincial Newspapers and produces approximately 420 papers per minute. The printing press was removed from the Bulletin Building in 2007 and relocated to APN's new printing facilities in Hempenstall Street in the Rockhampton suburb of Kawana, a more industrial area of the city.

After almost 88 years of working from the Bulletin Building, The Morning Bulletin ceased operations from the iconic multi-storey building on 21 March 2014. The newspaper temporarily relocated to an office at 35 Fitzroy Street, opposite the City Centre Plaza shopping centre.

But despite the newspaper's editor, Frazer Pearce, favourably describing the Fitzroy Street building as "decades ahead" for the functionality of an evolving business, The Morning Bulletin only remained at the address for approximately six months. In late 2014, The Morning Bulletin moved again when the newspaper relocated to their current address at 220 Bolsover Street - a small ground-level office in a building shared with the ANZ Bank, Bank of Queensland and Ray White Real Estate.

In August 2015, it was announced former Rockhampton resident Bevan Slattery had purchased the old Bulletin Building in Quay Street. At the time of purchase, Slattery said that he didn't have any firm plans for the Bulletin Building but hoped to eventually create a space to expand his business while helping other start-up companies.

Despite the changes and downsizing within the newspaper industry, which has resulted in numerous regional newspapers such as The Morning Bulletin moving out of their traditional homes and into smaller office buildings, The Morning Bulletin continues to have an existence within the community, albeit now mainly an online-only presence with the cessation of printed editions of The Morning Bulletin in 2020. Local news stories compiled by staff at The Morning Bulletin now appear on The Courier-Mail's website, with a few selected stories also appearing in localised printed editions of The Courier-Mail.

== Description ==
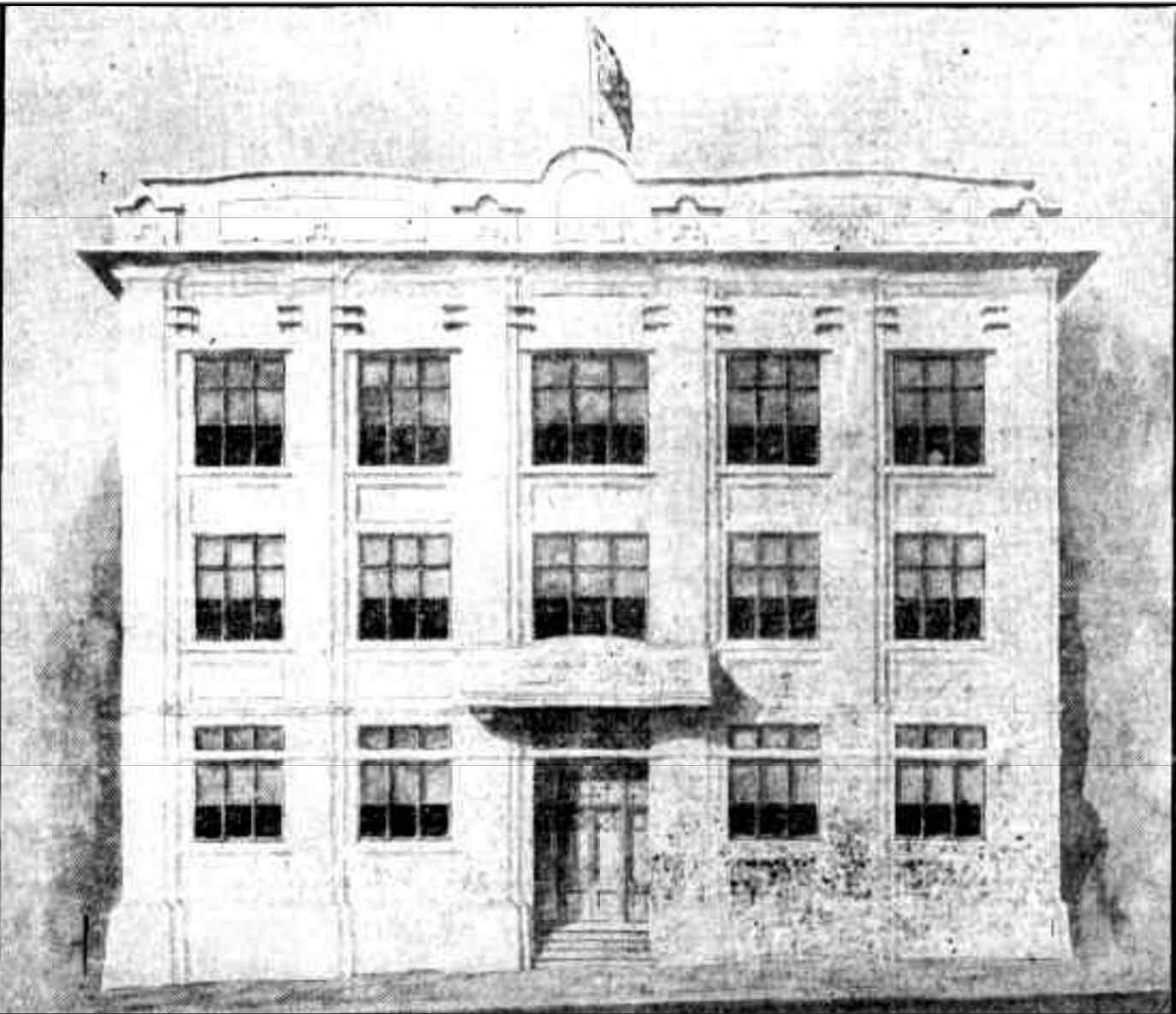
Bulletin Building, 1927

The Bulletin Building is a three-storey, rendered concrete building; the design of the building is classical with symmetrical facade, classical detailing and features which are stripped of ornamentation. The principal facade of the building is divided into bays by pilasters rising up through the three storeys dividing the face into five evenly spaced window bays. Large window openings line the facade; these are filled with non-original glazing in modern aluminium frames.

The entrance to the building is centrally located and emphasised with a concrete hood supported on shallow scrolled corbels and featuring relief lettering, BULLETIN BUILDING. The parapet of the building is curved along its length rising in the centre with a small semi-circular projection on which is relief lettering, EST 1861.

The main walls are reinforced concrete with breeze brick in fills. The entrance lobby is concrete floor with marble foyer. All other floors are constructed from concrete. The internal walls are reinforced concrete with breeze brick in fills.

Internally, the first floor has a later suspended ceiling throughout. This floor consists of office space, including the addition of new walls to create further office spaces. Early remaining internal elements include four sets of steel-framed windows along the eastern side of the building and timber doors leading to the press room at the southern end of the first floor. The Harris Web Press takes up a substantial portion of the press room.

The second floor has a later suspended ceiling throughout with a generally open office plan. Early remaining internal elements on this floor include timber doors on the northern side of the floor.

The third floor space is used for conference room facilities, similar to the other floors; there is a later suspended ceiling throughout.

== Heritage listing ==
The Bulletin Building was listed on the Queensland Heritage Register on 5 December 2005 having satisfied the following criteria.

The place is important in demonstrating the evolution or pattern of Queensland's history.

Constructed in 1926 as a purpose-built newspaper office, the Bulletin Building is significant for its association with Morning Bulletin which, established in 1861, is the earliest surviving newspaper in Rockhampton, and is an integral part of the history of Rockhampton and district.

The place is important in demonstrating the principal characteristics of a particular class of cultural places.

The Bulletin Building is a good example of Stripped Classical architectural treatment, designed to be congruous with neighbouring 19th century buildings.

The place is important because of its aesthetic significance.

In its scale, massing and facade articulation, the Bulletin Building complements other Quay Street buildings most of which date from the 19th century, and is an integral part of a premier Queensland streetscape.

The place has a strong or special association with a particular community or cultural group for social, cultural or spiritual reasons.

The Bulletin Building is significant for its association with the community of Rockhampton and surrounding area and those who have been, and continue to be, part of the Morning Bulletin story, including the editors, reporters and administration staff, past and present.

The place has a special association with the life or work of a particular person, group or organisation of importance in Queensland's history.

The Bulletin Building is significant as an example of the work of the architect Roy Chipps in this architectural style during his long practice in Rockhampton. It is also especially significant for its association with the Dunn family who owned the newspaper for over seventy years and had the Bulletin Building designed and constructed.
