= Central Telegraph (newspaper) =

Former newspaper in Queensland, Australia

- Type: Friday newspaper
- Owner(s): News Limited
- Founded: 1932
- Ceased publication: 2020
- Headquarters: Biloela, Queensland, Australia

The Central Telegraph was a newspaper based in Biloela, Queensland, providing local news coverage for communities located within the Banana Shire in Central Queensland, Australia from 1932 to 2020.

The newspaper was owned by News Corp Australia and was issued each Friday.

Founded by English immigrant Frank Heaton, the first edition of the Central Telegraph was published in January 1932.

In May 2020, it was announced by News Corp that the Central Telegraph would be ceasing publication. News Corp also announced the Central Telegraph would not moving to an exclusively online format, unlike other local Central Queensland newspapers such as the Central Queensland News, The Observer and The Morning Bulletin, all of which would continue providing local news on their respective websites.

The final edition of the Central Telegraph was published on 26 June 2020.
