= CQ News =

Newspaper in Queensland, Australia

CQ News is a weekly newspaper published on Fridays in Central Queensland, Australia. Its circulation through the Central Highlands Region is approximately 5800 copies.

== History ==
In 1937 the Gibson family began publishing the Central Queensland News in Emerald. It merged with the Clermont Telegraph in 1980. In 1985 the Provincial Newspaper (Qld) Ltd purchase the newspaper from the Gibsons. As at 2019, it is owned by News Corp Australia.
