= Robert Cousins =

Robert Cousins could refer to:

- Robert Cousins (builder) (1863–1933), Scottish Australian builder
- Robert G. Cousins (1859–1933), American politician
- Robert J. Cousins (born 1941), American nutrition scientist
- Robert K. Cousins, American playwright
