= Elizabeth Tilley (journalist) =

Australian journalist

- Education: Queensland University of Technology
- Occupation: Journalist
- Years active: 2003 – present
- Employer: News Corp Australia
- Known for: Journalism, TV presenting
- Website: Elizabeth Tilley profile

Elizabeth Tilley is an Australian journalist currently working as the Queensland Real Estate Editor for The Courier Mail.

Tilley was previously a newspaper reporter for the Bundaberg News-Mail and The Sunshine Coast Daily. In 2006, she became a business reporter at The Courier Mail.

In July 2010, Tilley joined Sky News as a producer and the presenter of Business Night on the Sky News Business Channel. She currently acts as a Brisbane reporter and news presenter.
