= Avonleigh =

Queensland heritage-listed house

Avonleigh, Rockhampton
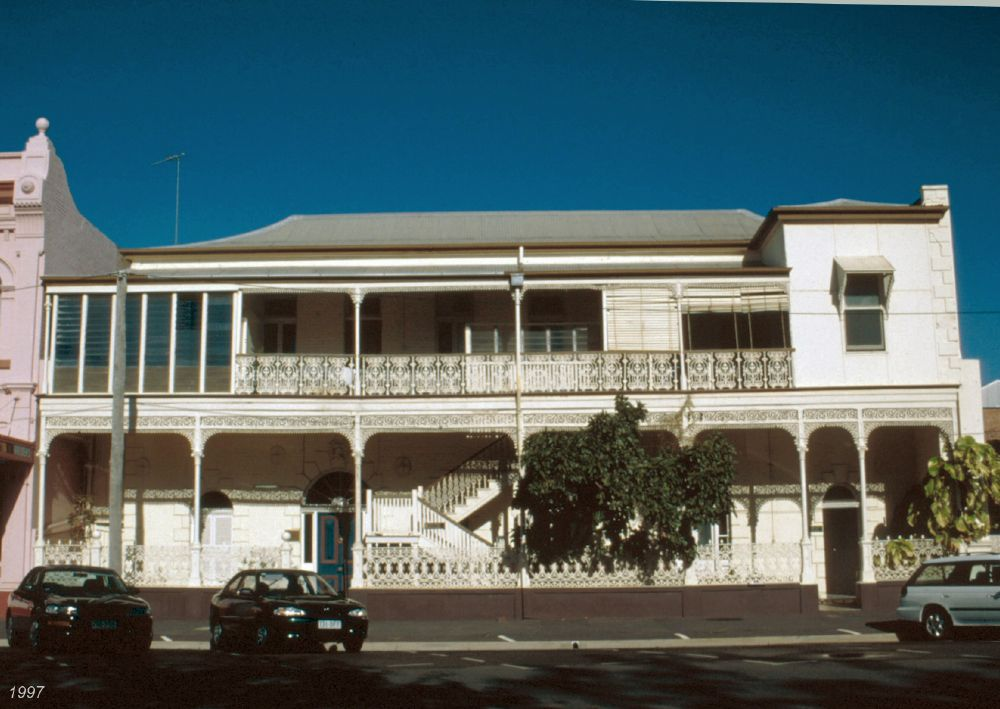
- Avonleigh, 1997

- Location within Queensland Location within Australia
- 23.3807°S 150.5162°E
- Location: 248 Quay Street, Rockhampton, Rockhampton Region, Queensland, Australia

History
- Design period: 1870s–1890s (late 19th century)
- Built: 1885

Site notes
- Architectural style: Victorian Filigree

Queensland Heritage Register
- Official name: Avonleigh
- Type: state heritage (built)
- Designated: 21 October 1992
- Reference no.: 600813
- Significant period: 1880s, early 1900s (fabric); 1880s–1930s (historical, social)
- Significant components: carving, residential accommodation – main house, theatre – operating
- Builders: Robert Cousins & Walter Lawson

Avonleigh is a heritage-listed house at 248 Quay Street, Rockhampton, Rockhampton Region, Queensland, Australia. It was built in 1885 by Robert Cousins and Walter Lawson. It was added to the Queensland Heritage Register on 21 October 1992.

== History ==
Avonleigh was erected in late 1885 for Frederick Augustus Morgan who started mining with his brothers at Mount Morgan in 1882. The building was constructed by Robert Cousins and Walter Lawson and was one of three town-houses established in Quay Street offering a domestic contribution to the street which is dominated by substantial 19th century commercial buildings. It is part of the prestigious development which occurred in this period due to the wealth which Mount Morgan Gold brought to Rockhampton.

The site was originally occupied by the Clarence & Eagle Hotel constructed in 1861 for John Champion who was involved with shipping on the "Clarence" and the "Eagle" steamers. The license for the hotel expired in the 1870s.

Fred Morgan acquired the land in 1883. Morgan arrived in Rockhampton in 1879 to take over the Criterion Hotel and was joined by his brothers with whom he commenced gold mining at Ironstone Mountain (Mount Morgan) in July 1882.

By 1884 Fred Morgan had sold all his shares in the mine for £62 000 and by 1886 the Morgans had completely sold out to partners Hall, Pattison and D'Arcy foregoing the enormous yield that the Mount Morgan Gold Mines would produce. The erection of Avonleigh corresponded to the sale of Fred Morgan's shares. After Fred Morgan had severed ties with the Mount Morgan Gold Mine he remained a prominent figure in Rockhampton pursuing pastoral and other mining interests as well as holding the office of Mayor of Rockhampton from 1891 to 1893. Frederick Morgan died at Avonleigh in November 1894 and the funeral left his Quay Street house on 9 November 1894.

Morgan's house was originally a four-roomed structure (two upstairs and two downstairs) with an open encircling verandah and a central hall containing a cedar staircase. The external walls were of exposed red-brick with the base, quoining and facing of the house of Stanwell freestone. The original cost of the home was estimated at £4000.

Frederick's widow, Mary Morgan, obtained title of the property in May 1901 and after her death in September 1901 the title was transferred to Frederick George Morgan in February 1902. In September 1904 the title was transferred to John Henry O'Brien. The building was used as a boarding house at some stage before 1906.

In April 1906 Daniel Patrick O'Brien acquired the property for use as a private hospital. Dr DP O'Brien was a prominent medical practitioner in Rockhampton holding the position of Government Medical Officer, President of the Rockhampton Medical Association and medical officer to the local Hibernian association.

On 7 December 1906 the right to use the party wall on the northern side of the building was registered indicating additions to the building were undertaken at about this time. After the building was extended to the northern side, the hospital consisted of eight bedrooms and an operation room on the first floor and on the ground floor were the waiting and consulting rooms, dressing room, dispensary and nurses quarters and sitting room. The doctor resided in adjoining apartments at the northern end of the ground floor. The walls of the interior were polished cement coated with enamel. The ceilings were of a newly introduced "artistic plaster" which was described as a "perfect non-conductor" of heat. The ceilings in the new section had decorative cherubs set into the plaster which are still extant.

By 1930 DP O'Brien had opened Leinster Private Hospital on the corner of Spencer and Agnes Streets but continued to reside and have consultation rooms at Avonleigh until 1938 when he leased the building to Dr VTJ Lynch who used Avonleigh as a surgery and residence. DP O'Brien died in July 1941 and in 1944 the property was transferred to his widow Elizabeth O'Brien.

In 1947 the property was purchased by William James Hinton who had a carrying business and used a portion of the ground floor as a warehouse. It was most likely during this tenure that the internal cedar stairs were removed, the external stairs installed and the rear structures demolished. In 1954 council records show the office on the ground floor was altered and in 1959 a temporary garage was erected. In 1958 the former John Headrick & Co warehouse adjacent to Avonleigh on the northern side was destroyed by fire.

In 1962 the mercantile company John Headrick & Co purchased Avonleigh for the purpose of using the vacant land at the rear as a parking space. The City Council required the company to construct two sets of stairs at the back of the building so each upstairs unit had a fire escape.

From 1969 a portion of the first floor was used as "Gallery Up Top" and display cases were installed. The timber entrance door of the gallery, originally internal, replaced a French light to emphasise the entry of the art gallery.

In 1978 Avonleigh was purchased by the present owners and has since been used as a doctor's surgery and other business offices on the ground floor and two residential units on the first floor.

== Description ==
Avonleigh, a two-storeyed structure with a concave hipped corrugated iron roof, is built fronting Quay Street overlooking the Fitzroy River to the northeast with rear access off Quay Lane. The building is constructed of Flemish bond brickwork with sandstone quoining, all of which has been painted. The building contains two professional suites to the ground floor, and two flats to the first floor.

The building has a two-storeyed verandah with a concave corrugated iron awning fronting Quay Street and returning along the southeast boundary abutting the adjacent Clewett's Building. The verandah has cast iron columns, brackets, valance and balustrade, with pedestals and frieze to the ground floor. The ground floor has a masonry upstand supporting the columns and balustrade, with two openings to provide access to the original main entrance at the southern end, and to the addition at the northern end. A timber framed dog-leg stair has been inserted midway along the verandah, with a timber batten balustrade to the lower flight, and cast iron balustrade to the upper flight. The southern return has been enclosed at ground floor level with a dowelled timber gate and vertically jointed boarding. The ground floor arched openings have painted sandstone quoining and voussoirs, and the original main entrance has a timber panelled door with arched glass fanlight and sidelight panels, with a carved keystone depicting a lions head and shell motif. The entrance is flanked by French doors with arched fanlights and timber shutters. The northern end of the building has a single entrance door with arched fanlight, and adjacent French doors which have arched fanlight and sidelight panels with a carved keystone depicting an arm holding a sword.

The first floor verandah has been enclosed at the southern end with glass louvres, and glass louvres and latticed timber panels frame the stair and form entrance screens to the two first floor flats. French doors open onto the verandah, and the northern end has timber slat blinds and a fibrous cement sheeted room with a corrugated iron hipped roof and a sash window with a timber batten and corrugated iron hood. The room abuts the northern boundary wall which has quoining to the Quay Street frontage.

The building has two rendered masonry chimney stacks, and the rear of the structure has a first floor verandah which has been enclosed with fibrous cement sheeting and casement and glass louvre windows. Two timber framed stairs access the first floor flats, and the rear wall of the building consists of painted brickwork and quoining at the southern end and rendered brickwork at the northern end. The ground floor has a lean-to addition at the northern end with fibrous cement wall sheeting and a corrugated iron skillion roof. The southeast ground floor verandah space has been enclosed to form a laundry area.

Internally, the building has rendered walls and cedar skirtings, architraves and panelled doors. The ground floor northern professional suite has decorative plaster ceilings and cornices, with central panels depicting cherubs located in the principal rooms. The northern entrance accesses a reception area, which opens into a rear room which has an arch separating a narrow rear section with a wired glass skillion skylight. The skylight has been sheeted over externally, and the arch has moulded imposts and a central shield depicting an arm holding a sword. The rear section opens to an attached lean-to housing a kitchenette. A large room is located adjacent to the reception, with French doors with arched fanlight and sidelights of coloured glass.

The southern professional suite has two large rooms either side of a wide entrance and reception area. The entrance has coloured glass fanlight and sidelights, and an arch with Corinthian order imposts divides the space. This area originally housed a cedar staircase, the location of which is evidenced by infill to the boarded timber ceiling. The southern room has a corner fireplace with painted timber surround, and the northern room has a central fireplace with marble surround.

The first floor northern flat has decorative plaster ceilings and cornices, with central panels depicting cherubs located in the principal rooms. The rear verandah has been enclosed to accommodate kitchen and bathroom facilities. The southern flat has two large rooms either side of a central entrance hallway accessed via a timber panelled door, with enclosed verandahs at the rear and to the south. The two large rooms have boarded timber ceilings with deep cornices, of which the southern room has expressed dentils. The northern room has a painted timber fireplace surround, and the southern room has a marble fireplace surround. The hallway has an arch at the rear, accessing the enclosed rear verandah, which originally housed a sash window to the stair as evidenced by extant framing and architraves. A kitchen and bathroom are located at the rear, and a laundry to the south. The enclosure at the southern end of the front verandah houses a second bedroom.

The rear of the property contains a car parking area entered via Quay Lane.

== Heritage listing ==
Avonleigh was listed on the Queensland Heritage Register on 21 October 1992 having satisfied the following criteria.

The place is important in demonstrating the evolution or pattern of Queensland's history.

Avonleigh forms part of the historic Quay Street precinct which is distinguished by its substantial 19th century buildings. Erected in 1885, Avonleigh is one of two buildings originally designed and constructed as domestic structures in the street which is dominated by commercial buildings and reflects the affluent development which occurred in Rockhampton during the boom time of gold mining at Mount Morgan from 1882.

The place is important because of its aesthetic significance.

Avonleigh, through its form, scale and materials, makes a strong aesthetic and architectural contribution to the Quay Street streetscape and Rockhampton townscape. The building's decorative cast iron verandahs emphasise the nineteenth century character of the street and quayside, and are important in assisting the interpretation of the original section of the building as a substantial late nineteenth century residence. The building also has fine interior materials and finishes, the detailing of which reflects a fine quality of workmanship.

The place has a strong or special association with a particular community or cultural group for social, cultural or spiritual reasons.

Avonleigh has special association for the people of Rockhampton as part of the historical streetscape of Quay Street which is closely associated with the image of the city. Avonleigh's conversion in 1906 to one of the first private hospitals in Rockhampton and its subsequent use as a medical surgery gives it an association with the local community as one of Rockhampton's longstanding medical surgeries.

The place has a special association with the life or work of a particular person, group or organisation of importance in Queensland's history.

Avonleigh has special association with Frederick Morgan who with his brothers in 1882, was responsible for the commencement of goldmining at Mount Morgan. Avonleigh was erected as his residence in 1885 after the sale of his shares in Mount Morgan and as such is a manifestation of the early success of the Mount Morgan Mines.
