= Robert Cousins (builder) =

Australian builder

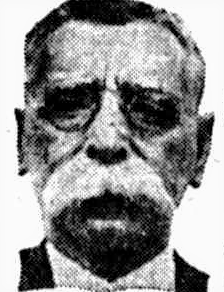
- Robert Cousins c. 1933
- Born: 7 December 1863; Glenluce, Wigtownshire, Scotland
- Died: 18 October 1933 (aged 69); Rockhampton, Queensland, Australia
- Occupation: builder
- Years active: 1885–1933
- Known for: Establishing R. Cousins & Co; serving as an alderman and mayor of Rockhampton City Council
- Notable work: Avonleigh, Rockhampton Girls Grammar School, Kenmore House, Bulletin Building

Mayor of City of Rockhampton
- In office 1929–1930

Robert Cousins (7 December 1863 – 18 October 1933) was a Scottish Australian builder.

He is best known for his work constructing such heritage-listed buildings as Avonleigh, the Rockhampton Girls Grammar School and the Bulletin Building, and for establishing the company R. Cousins & Co.

Cousins is also known for his time serving with Rockhampton City Council, to which he was first elected to as an alderman in 1921.

He briefly served as the mayor of Rockhampton from 1929 to 1930 following the resignations of Thomas Dunlop and that of Dunlop's successor, Joseph Jeffries, who resigned as mayor just five days after being appointed to the position.

== Early life ==
Cousins was born in Glenluce and was raised in the West Highlands of Scotland. He attended school in Kilmun until the age of 15 when he began a carpentry and joinery apprenticeship in Dunoon.

He then went to Dumbarton where he worked as a journeyman.

== Career ==
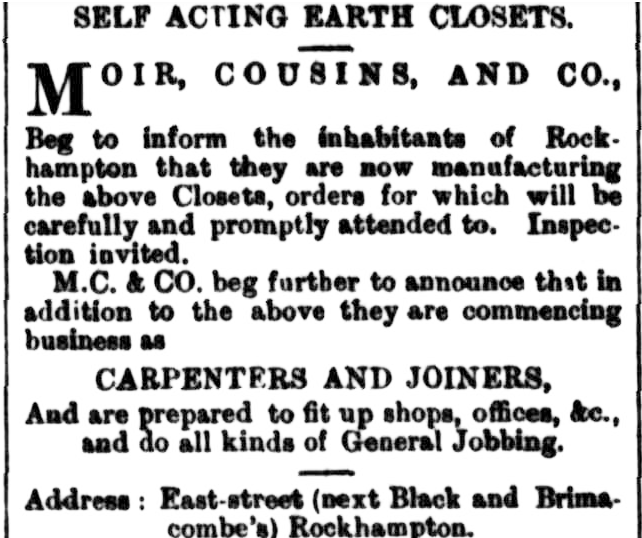
1886 newspaper advertisement for Moir, Cousins & Co

In 1885, Cousins emigrated to Australia aboard the RMS Roma. After disembarking in Rockhampton, Queensland, he teamed up with fellow Scotsman Walter Lawson and set to work constructing Avonleigh for mining magnate Frederick Augustus Morgan.

In 1886, Cousins established the firm Cousins & Moir Co with Thomas Moir, a fellow Scotsman who he had worked with in Scotland and who had also been aboard the RMS Roma.

Cousins & Moir built the Rockhampton Girls Grammar School in 1890, along with the Rockhampton Supreme Court Hotel and the Mount Morgan Receiving Stores. They also built the Kenmore Mansion in Ward Street which was completed in 1894.

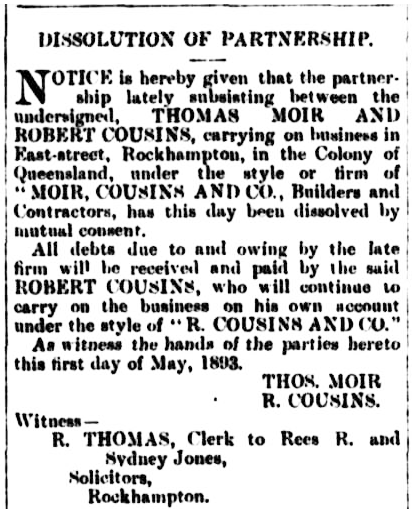
Dissolution of Partnership notice, 1893

In 1893, Cousins and Moir mutually agreed to dissolve the partnership with Cousins continuing on the business as R. Cousins & Co. Moir continued his own career and built such landmarks as the Lakes Creek Hotel and the Emerald Railway Station.

Cousins' son Robert Steele Cousins (more commonly referred to as Bob Cousins) completed his apprenticeship at the company and became managing director of R. Cousins & Co. in 1908. The company became a limited liability company in 1927 whose directors were all members of the Cousins family.

When the Rockhampton General Hospital received a donation of 270 books from The Times Book Club in London, Cousins constructed a book case to house them in and then presented it to the hospital.

When Robert Cousins died in 1933, brothers Bob Cousins and Doug Cousins took over the business as principals with their sister Mabel Cousins serving as secretary. For 65 years, the business and workshop stood in the one location on the corner of Fitzroy and East Street in the city centre. In 1953, the Cousins family sold the site following the opening of the Fitzroy Bridge the previous year.

By 1958, R. Cousins & Co. was Rockhampton's oldest existing building firm and had expanded after purchasing the Kalapa Brickworks in 1953.

Throughout its history, the company had been responsible for works on buildings such as Kenmore House, the General Hospital, the Glenmore Power Station, Earl's Court Theatre and The Range Convent and High School, among many others.

R. Cousins & Co. built the Nurses Quarters at the Rockhampton Hospital which were opened by Bill Moore in 1954 and stood until they were demolished in 2008.

The company also built a new brick convent building at the now infamous St Joseph's Orphanage at Neerkol.

The company which Robert Cousins had founded finally closed after the death of Bob Cousins in 1973.

== Politics ==
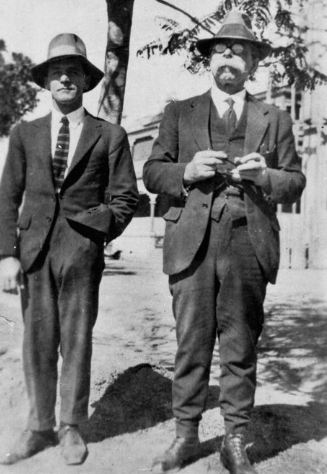
Robert Cousins (right) with son Bob Cousins, who carried on the business and also served as an alderman on Rockhampton City Council after Robert's death in 1933

Cousins first entered politics when he was elected as an alderman on the Rockhampton City Council at the municipal elections held on 23 July 1921. Cousins was representing the Rate and Taxpayers Association which enjoyed considerable success with a swing against Labour candidates which was reflected across the state and saw their mayoral candidate William Charlton become Rockhampton's new mayor. Among the alderman elected, Cousins received the second highest vote.

The year of 1929 marked a turbulent time for Rockhampton City Council beginning with the resignation of Rockhampton mayor Thomas Dunlop who successfully ran as an independent candidate at the 1929 Queensland state election.

A special Rockhampton City Council meeting was called for 5 August 1929 where Cousins and fellow alderman Joseph Jeffries were nominated by aldermen Falconer West Hutton and Thomas Joseph Lee respectively to be Dunlop's successor. Jeffries won the vote 5–4.

As a special council meeting on 10 August 1929 where the alderman voted for a person to fill the vacancy left by Jeffries' elevation to mayor. After James Cleland Spence had been named as the new alderman, Jeffries suddenly tendered his resignation as mayor, stating: "I declare Mr Spence elected. And here is my resignation as mayor."

Jeffries holds the record for the shortest-serving mayor of Rockhampton City Council, and his very brief tenure was reported widely in the national press. A local Rockhampton resident was inspired by the events to write a poem called The Mayorless City which pondered whether it was time to "have a lady mayor". It would be another 71 years before a woman would be elected as the mayor of Rockhampton City Council.

Another special meeting was scheduled to be held on 14 August 1929 but with so many aldermen absent the meeting was adjourned due to not having a quorum.

With reported hostility and frictions between the political parties, it prompted The Morning Bulletin to remark: "Rockhampton, the second city in Queensland, is still without a mayor. Is it not about time that commonsense overruled party strife and petty indifferences?" and described the time as "one of the most inglorious episodes in the annals of Rockhampton local government."

A special meeting was then held on 22 August 1929 which was called so a mayor could finally be elected. Robert Cousins and William Robert Goss were nominated to fill the vacancy left by Jeffries' sudden resignation. Cousins was the successful nominee defeating Goss 5–4.

Cousins served as Rockhampton's mayor until the 1930 local government elections where after a public vote and a tightly fought contest between Cousins, Leonard Garfield Haigh and Thomas Joseph Lee, no winner was declared. The result was decided at another special council meeting on 14 August 1930 which saw Lee become Cousins' successor.

Lee's elevation to mayor finally provided some stability for Rockhampton City Council and effectively ended a turbulent time which saw the city served for four mayors in less than two years.

Between 1930 and 1933, Cousins continued to serve on the council as an alderman and was vocal on such issues as the deteriorating condition of the original Fitzroy Bridge. Cousins was also appointed as chairman of the council's water supply committee much to the chagrin of his colleague Leonard Haigh. Cousins and Lee were both selected as the two delegates who would represent the city council at the local authorities' conference in Brisbane in August 1931, after which Cousins took eight weeks leave and travelled to Thursday Island.

Cousins again contested for the mayoral position at the 1933 local government elections in what was a bitterly fought campaign between the incumbent (Lee), former mayor Dunlop and Colonel David Day Dawson. Cousins ultimately polled third thus ending his career in local government.

Although serving as mayor for only a short period, Cousins still managed to attend a number of milestone events. This included presiding over the very first meeting of the Rockhampton Tourist League in January 1930 which was arguably the first earnest attempt by the city to promote the local area to the tourist market. Cousins was appointed as the inaugural president of the league which was formed in conjunction with the Queensland Government Tourist Bureau with the aim of encouraging tourists to visit the Rockhampton region. The league was an early forerunner to modern organisations such as Capricorn Enterprise.

Cousins also officially opened the Rockhampton Aero Club on 2 March 1930, prior to the official opening of the Connor Park Aerodrome by alderman Colonel David Day Dawson in Cousins' absence on 15 March 1930. Cousins was the first patron on the Rockhampton Aero Club.

Some of the other duties he performed as mayor included opening the 1930 golf season at the Rockhampton Golf Club and attending the laying of the foundation stone by James Duhig at the site of the Convent of our Lady of Good Counsel on the grounds of The Range Convent.

== Personal life and death ==
Cousins married Mary Ann Steele on 25 March 1890. They had seven children between 1891 and 1905 - two sons and five daughters.

Their daughter Lillian died in 1920.

During his life, he was heavily involved in various sporting and community organisations.

During his younger years in Rockhampton, Cousins played soccer, rugby union and tennis. He was a member of the first Central Queensland representative rugby union team. He was also a foundation member of the Rockhampton Bowling Club and was serving his fourth successive term as the club's president at the time of his death in 1933.

Cousins was a committee member of the Rockhampton Agricultural Society, Employer's Association, Chamber of Commerce and the General Hospital. Cousins was a member of the Douglas Masonic Lodge. He was also a member of the Rockhampton Musical Union and performed as a violin player with C. Wood's Orchestra for 25 years.

His wife Mary Ann Cousins died on 28 February 1929 and was buried on 1 March 1929.

Robert Cousins died at his Lennox Street home in Wandal on 18 October 1933. He was buried in the South Rockhampton Cemetery. His successor Thomas Joseph Lee served as one of the pallbearers during the funeral.

His son Bob Cousins also entered politics and served as an alderman on Rockhampton City Council. He was first elected at the 1943 local government elections and was re-elected numerous times, serving on the council into the Rex Pilbeam era.

== Legacy ==
A street in The Range was named Cousins Street in honour of Robert Cousins.

== Gallery ==
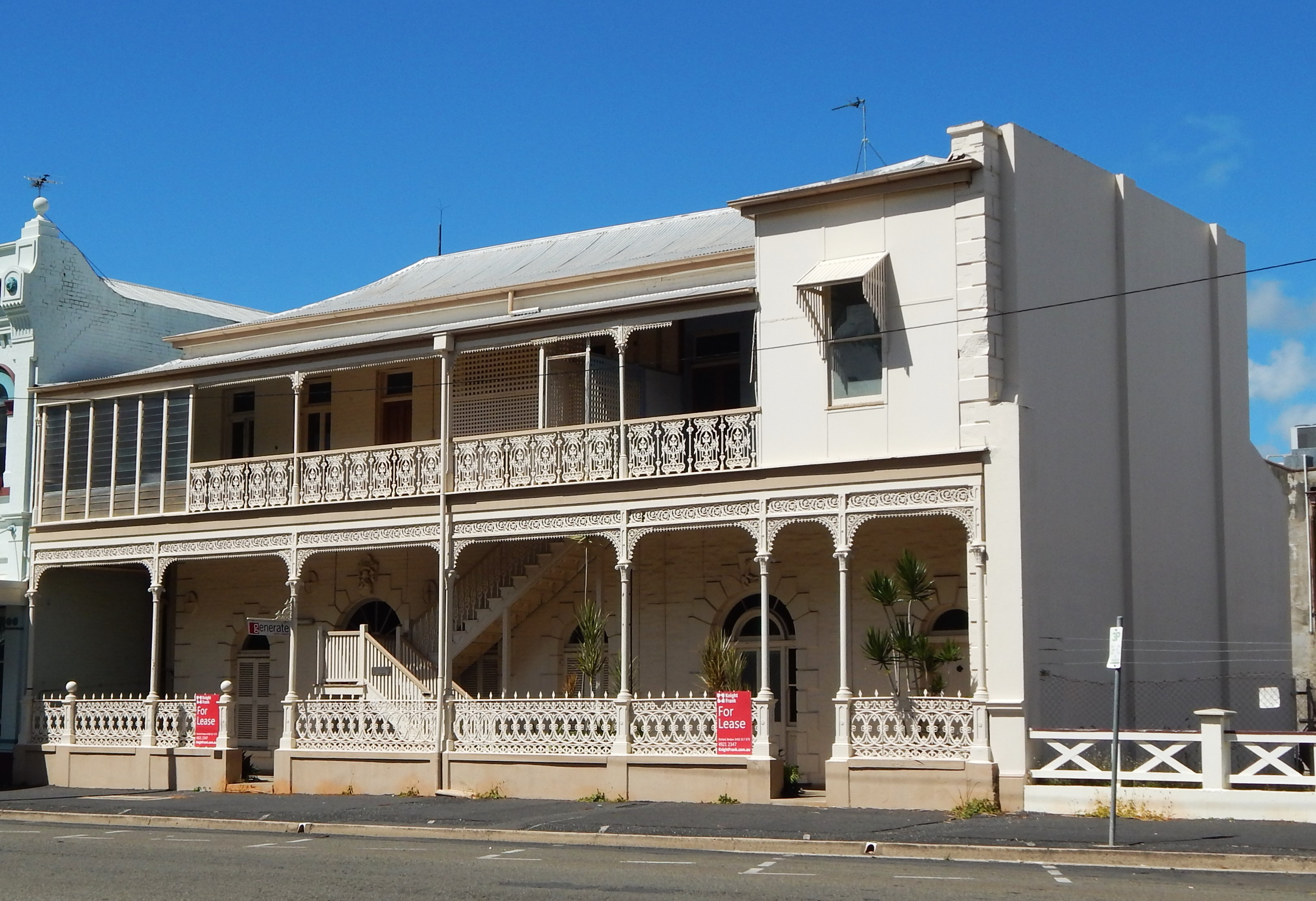
Avonleigh, built by Robert Cousins and Walter Lawson in 1885

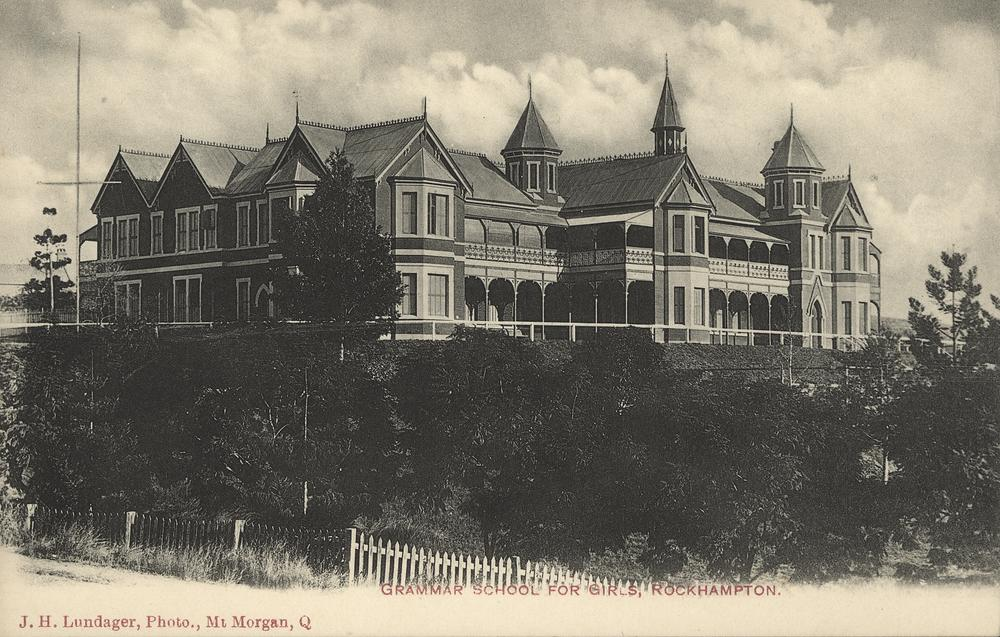
Rockhampton Girls Grammar School, built in 1890 by Robert Cousins and Thomas Moir

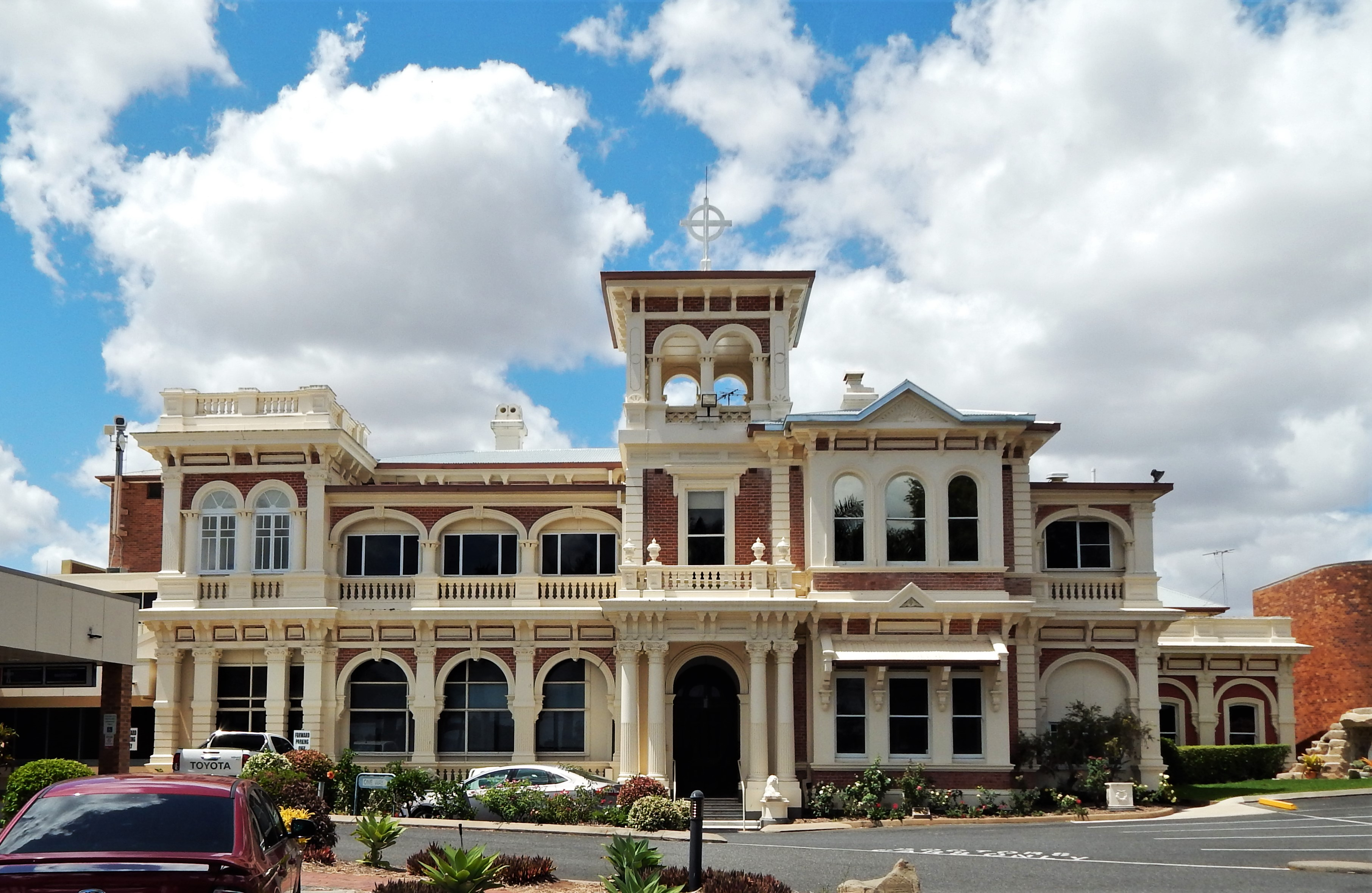
Kenmore House built in 1894 by Robert Cousins and Thomas Moir

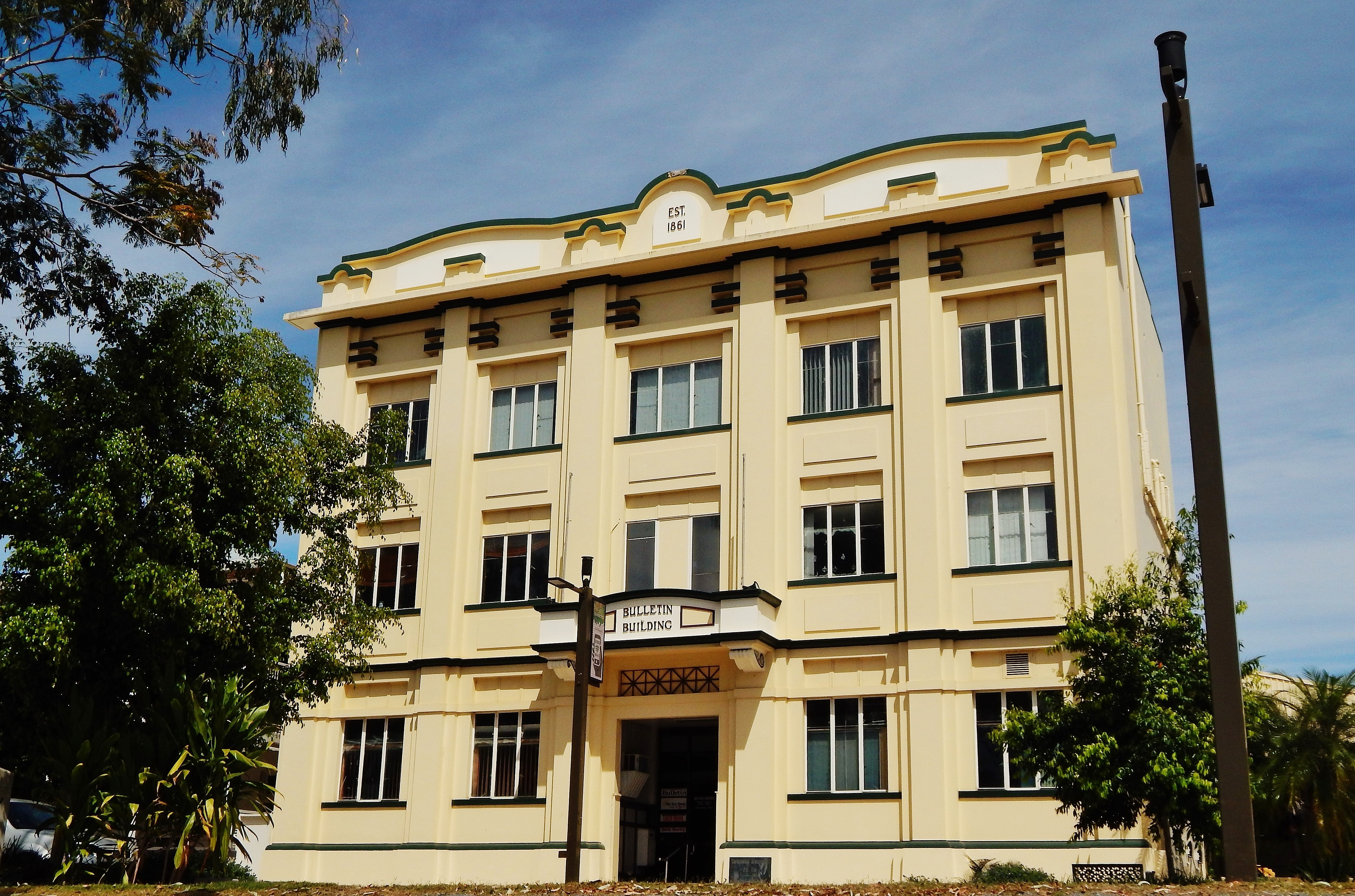
Bulletin Building built in 1926 by Robert Cousins' firm R. Cousins & Co

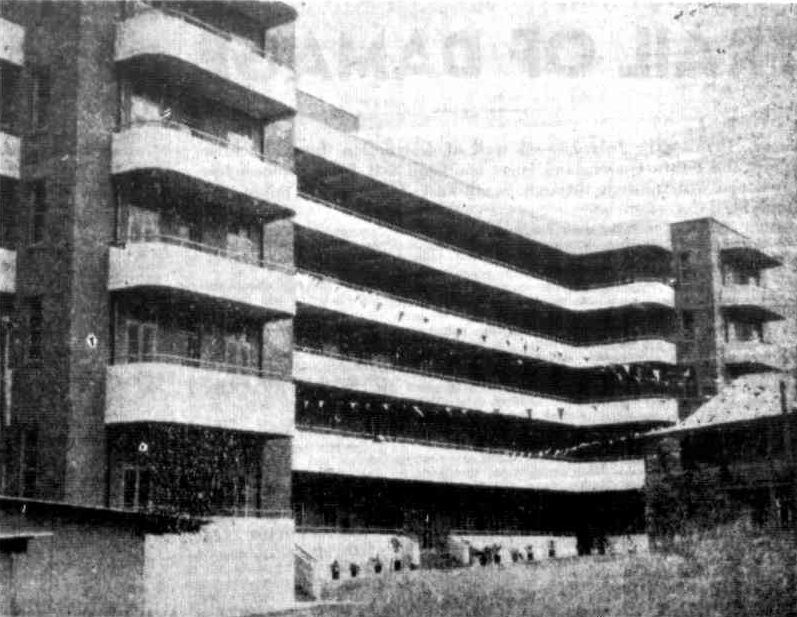
Nurses Quarters at Rockhampton Hospital, built by R. Cousins & Co in 1954.
