= Thomas Chataway =

Australian politician

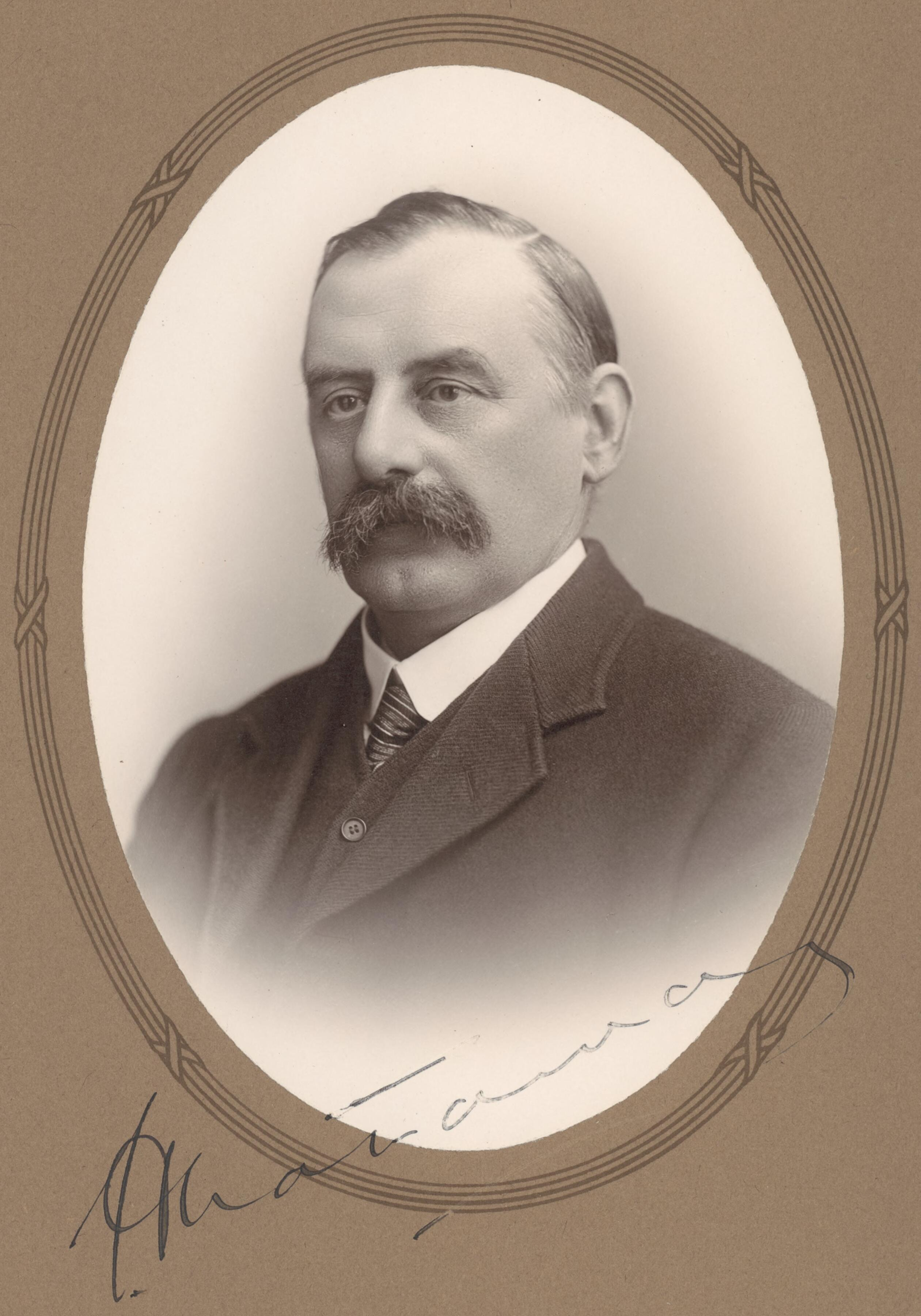

Senator for Queensland
- In office 1 January 1907 – 30 June 1913

Personal details
- Born: 6 April 1864 Wartling, Sussex, England
- Died: 5 March 1925 (aged 60) Toorak, Victoria, Australia
- Party: Anti-Socialist (to 1909); Liberal (from 1909)
- Spouse: Anna Altereith (m. 1890)
- Relatives: James Chataway (brother); Gertrude Chataway (sister)
- Occupation: Journalist

Thomas Drinkwater Chataway (6 April 1864 – 5 March 1925) was an Australian journalist and politician. He was a Senator for Queensland from 1907 to 1913, representing the Anti-Socialist Party and Liberal Party. Prior to entering politics he served as editor and co-owner of the Daily Mercury in Mackay, Queensland. He was known for his advocacy for the Queensland sugar industry.

== Early life ==
Chataway was born on 6 April 1864 in Wartling, Sussex, England. He was the son of Elizabeth Ann (née Drinkwater) and Rev. James Chataway, an Anglican minister.

Chataway spent his early years in England, attending Charterhouse School. In 1881 he joined his older brother James Chataway in Australia. He worked on the Liverpool Plains in New South Wales for a year and then moved to Queensland where he was employed as a sugar-boiler at Habana near Mackay. In 1886, Chataway began writing for the Mackay Mercury of which his brother was editor and co-owner. He and his brother established the Sugar Journal and Tropical Cultivator in 1892, a monthly journal which claimed circulation in "Queensland, New South Wales, Fiji, Mauritius and other tropical and subtropical countries".

Chataway took over as editor of the Mercury and Sugar Journal after his brother's election to the parliament of Queensland in 1893. He oversaw the merger of the Mercury with the Mackay Chronicle in 1905, with the resulting daily newspaper named the Daily Mercury. Chataway served as an alderman on the Mackay Town Council, including as mayor of Mackay from 1904 to 1906. He was also active in various community organisations including the Mackay School of Arts, the Mackay Show Association and the local fire board.

== Politics ==
Chataway was elected to the Senate at the 1906 federal election, winning a six-year term commencing on 1 January 1907 (later extended by six months pursuant to a constitutional amendment). He was elected on a ticket as one of three candidates endorsed by the Queensland Central Anti-Socialistic Council, alongside Robert Sayers and Anthony St Ledger. He joined the Anti-Socialist Party in parliament.

In 1908, Chataway was elected as opposition Senate whip, simultaneous with Joseph Cook's election as party leader. He joined the new Liberal Party upon its creation in 1909 and was elected government whip in the Deakin government.

In the Senate, Chataway spoke frequently on the Queensland sugar industry where he supported protectionist policies, including "agricultural bounties to counterbalance tariff protection for southern manufactures". He supported the White Australia policy and was particularly opposed to the use of "coloured labour" in the sugar industry, calling for Europeans to be imported as a source of labour. This was a reversal of his views in the 1880s where he had supported Kanaka labour.

Chataway lost his seat at the 1913 federal election, with Sayers and St Ledger also losing their seats as the Australian Labor Party (ALP). He remained in Melbourne after his defeat and did not again seek elective office, although he remained involved in politics as secretary to Cook as federal opposition leader and later as an adviser to Senator Edward Millen. Chataway remained interested in the sugar industry, writing for the monthly Australian Sugar Journal and contributing to international sugar industry publications. He also served as the Melbourne correspondent for the Cairns Post.

== Personal life and retirement ==
In 1890, Chataway married Anna Altereith, with whom he had three children. He died of arteriosclerosis on 5 March 1925 in Toorak, Victoria. He was interred at Brighton Cemetery.
