= Andrew Dunn (businessman) =

The Hon Andrew Dunn
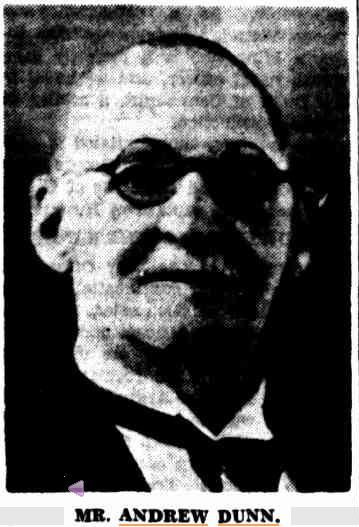

Member of the Queensland Legislative Council
- In office 3 July 1914 – 23 March 1922

Personal details
- Born: Andrew Dunn; 24 May 1854 Greenock, Renfrewshire, Scotland
- Died: 29 April 1934 (aged 79) Brisbane, Australia
- Resting place: Maryborough Cemetery
- Spouse(s): Kate McIntyre (m. 1879, d. 1889), Jane Cran (m. 1891, d. 1930), Marcella Heller Foote (m. 1932, d. 1941)
- Occupation: Newspaper proprietor

Andrew Dunn (1854–1934) was a newspaper proprietor and politician in Queensland, Australia. He was a Member of the Queensland Legislative Council.

== Early life ==
Andrew Dunn was born on 4 May 1854 in Greenock, Scotland, the son of Andrew Dunn and his wife Ann (née Anderson).

== Newspaper proprietor ==
Having pursued careers unrelated to newspapers, in the late 1880s Andrew Dunn was appointed as a business manager for the Maryborough Chronicle. In 1888 he was given a £10 bonus from each stakeholder for his good work. This enabled him to purchase shares in the business and become a director. By 1891 he was the chairman of the company.

His son Andrew (junior) had been working for the Rockhampton Bulletin for some years, when the death of one of its owners, John Blair, provided the opportunity for Andrew Dunn (senior) to purchase a controlling interest in the newspaper and put his sons Andrew (junior) and William Herbert Alan (Herbie) Dunn in charge of it. Later, after World War I, another son, James, would become the business manager for the newspaper.

In 1914, Andrew Dunn purchased the Warwick Argus. Son Herbie Dunn was installed as managing director. In 1919, they persuaded the Irwin family, who owned the rival Warwick Examiner and Times to amalgamate to form the Warwick Daily News rather than continue an unprofitable competition. Herbie Dunn became managing editor and chairman of directors of the merged publication.

In November 1919, Andrew Dunn purchased The Wide Bay and Burnett News in November 1919, which he merged with the Maryborough Chronicle.

In June 1922, Andrew Dunn acquired a controlling interest of The Toowoomba Chronicle and merged it with its competitor, the Darling Downs Gazette.

In July 1929, Andrew Dunn purchased The Evening News in Rockhampton.

In 1907, Andrew Dunn established the Queensland Country Press Association. He served several times as president, and consistently on the executive committee until his death in 1934.

== Politics ==
Andrew Dunn initially was involved in local politics, serving on the Maryborough City Council from 1903 to 1915. He was mayor in 1903 and again in 1914.

On 3 July 1914, Andrew Dunn was appointed to the Queensland Legislative Council. Although a lifetime appointment, his service terminated on 23 March 1922 when the Council voted to abolish itself. He took an active role in trying to re-establish it.

== Later life ==
On 29 April 1934, Andrew Dunn died in Brisbane following a short bout of pneumonia. The following day, his body was taken by train to Maryborough for the funeral, followed by burial in Maryborough Cemetery with his first wife, Kate. His second wife Jane died in 1930 and was buried with him in Maryborough.
