= Chinchilla News =

Australian online newspaper

The Chinchilla News and Murilla Advertiser
- Type: Weekly newspaper
- Owner: APN News & Media
- Founder: John Hay Braddock
- Founded: 14 December 1907
- Website: www.chinchillanews.com.au

The Chinchilla News and Murilla Advertiser (or simply Chinchilla News) is a weekly online newspaper published in Chinchilla, Queensland, Australia.

== History ==
The newspaper was first published on 14 December 1907. The newspaper traditionally covers the Chinchilla, Miles, Tara and Taroom districts.

Along with many other regional Australian newspapers owned by NewsCorp, the newspaper ceased print editions in June 2020 and became an online-only publication from 26 June 2020.

=== Ownership History ===
- John Hay Braddock (1907–1909)
- Thomas Birkett (October 1909 – 1943)
- Frank and Harvey Fuller (1973–1979)
- David and Dorothy Fuller (1980–1987)
- Provincial Newspapers (QLD) (30 October 1987 - ?)
