= Robert K. Cousins =

American dramatist

Robert K. Cousins is a contemporary American playwright and founding contributor to phenomenalism, a neo-existential 'post post modern' approach to theatre that has grown out of the experimental performance work staged by Odd Act Theatre Group.

Cousins is the group's resident playwright and has been writing for them since 2005. His plays have appeared at festivals across North America, opening in Princeton, NJ; Washington, DC; Montreal, Quebec; London, Ontario; and Edinburgh, Scotland.

Cousins' plays explore the relationship between reality and fiction. His plays are largely meta-theatrical, focusing on the metaphysics of performance in order to explore the ontology and ethics of existence. Cousins' plays often take the form of a philosophical conflict that trickles down into personal and physical confrontation between the characters. Phenomenalism, which seeks to overcome the personal disconnections bred out of postmodernism, draws on Cousins' dramatized explorations of the nature of reality to break the simulation of the theatrical event and create a more direct confrontation between the artist and the audience.

As a founding member of Odd Act Theatre Group, Cousins' career has developed along with the group. His first full-length play, All the Rabbits, had a modest debut at the Carslake Center in suburban Bordentown, NJ. How the Money Goes, his second full-length, also opened in central New Jersey but transferred to Washington, DC, and has since appeared at the Edinburgh Festival Fringe. Ice Cream Musical: The Ice Cream Musical and A Wild Play have both opened in Canada in Montreal and London, Ontario respectively.
