= Daily Mercury =

Daily newspaper serving Mackay, Queensland

- Type: Newspaper
- Format: Tabloid
- Owner: News Corp Australia
- Editor: Heidi Petith
- Founded: 1866
- Language: English
- Headquarters: Mackay, Queensland, Australia; Level 1, 47 Gordon Street; Mackay QLD 4740
- Circulation: 16,045 Monday-Friday; 19,839 Saturday
- Website: www.dailymercury.com.au

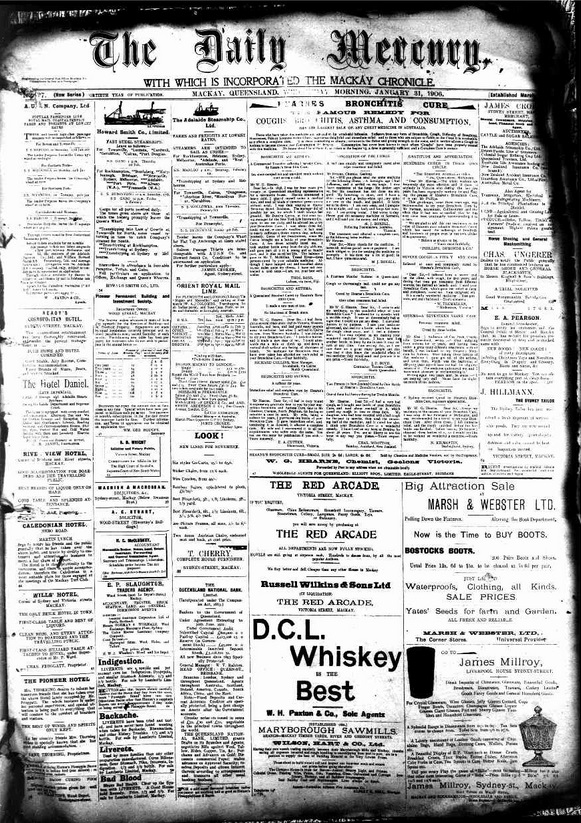
Front page of the Daily Mercury, 31 January 1906

The Daily Mercury is an online newspaper which serves the Mackay region in Queensland, Australia. Print edition was later revived with a publication on Friday only.

The newspaper is printed by Mackay Printing and Publishing and is owned by News Corp Australia.

== History ==
The Daily Mercury ran from 1866 to 1905 as the Mackay Mercury and South Kennedy Advertiser. From 1887 the paper was issued under the name Mackay Mercury until 1906 when the Daily Chronicle was absorbed by the paper and it was renamed the Daily Mercury.

Brothers James and Thomas Chataway served as editors and co-owners of the newspaper from the late 1880s.

Along with many other regional Australian newspapers owned by NewsCorp, the Daily Mercury ceased print editions in June 2020 and became online-only publication. The print edition was revived in late August, 2021 as a weekly, Friday-only edition.

== Editors ==
- ?? - May 2011: David Fisher
- May 2011 - ??: Jennifer Pomfrett
- ?? - ??: Jennifer Spilsbury
- ?? - ??: Jon Ortlieb
- November 2014 - ?? : Meredith Papavasiliou
- ?? - June 2018: Rowan Hunnam
- June–September 2018: Melanie Plane and Cas Garvey (acting)
- September 2018 - November: Paul McLoughlin
- November 2018 - January 2019: Melanie Plane (acting)
- January 2019 – 2022: Rae Wilson
- December 2022 – 2024: Heidi Petith
- 2024–present: Paul Brescia

== Digitisation ==
The papers have been digitised as part of the Australian Newspapers Digitisation Program of the National Library of Australia.

== See also ==
- List of newspapers in Australia
