= Warwick Daily News =

Australian newspaper

- Type: Newspaper
- Format: Tabloid
- Owner: News Corp Australia
- Deputy editor: Jeremy Sollars
- Founded: 1919
- Language: English
- Headquarters: Warwick, Queensland, Australia; PO Box 358; Warwick QLD 4370
- Circulation: 3,218 Monday-Friday; 3,439 Saturday
- Price: A$1.10 Monday-Friday; A$1.30 Saturday
- Website: warwickdailynews.com.au

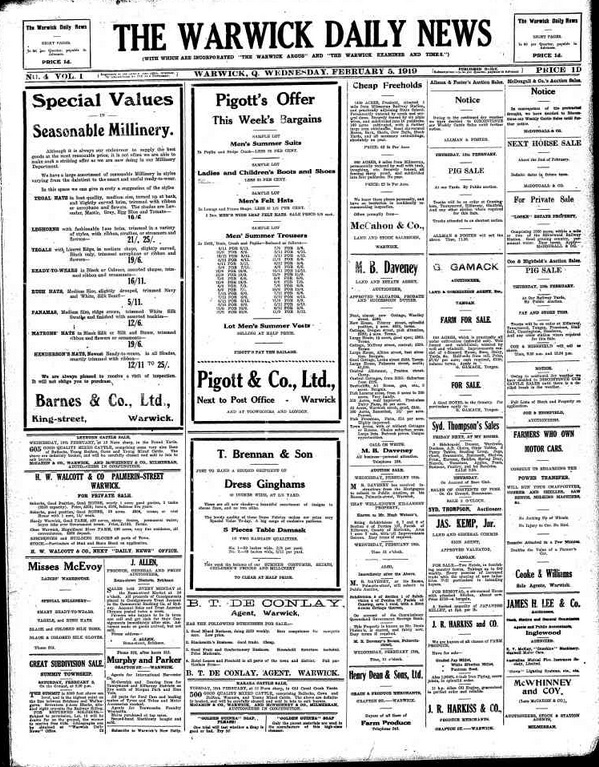
Front page of the Warwick Daily News, 5 February 1919.

The Warwick Daily News is an online newspaper serving Warwick, Queensland, Australia. The newspaper is published by The Warwick Newspaper Pty Ltd and owned by News Corp Australia.

The Warwick Daily News is circulated to the residents of Warwick Shire and surrounds to Inglewood in the west, Killarney in the east, Clifton to the north and the New South Wales border to the south, including Stanthorpe and the Granite Belt.

The circulation of the Warwick Daily News is 3,218 Monday to Friday and 3,439 on Saturday.

The Warwick Daily News website is part of News Corp Australia's News Regional Media network.

== History ==
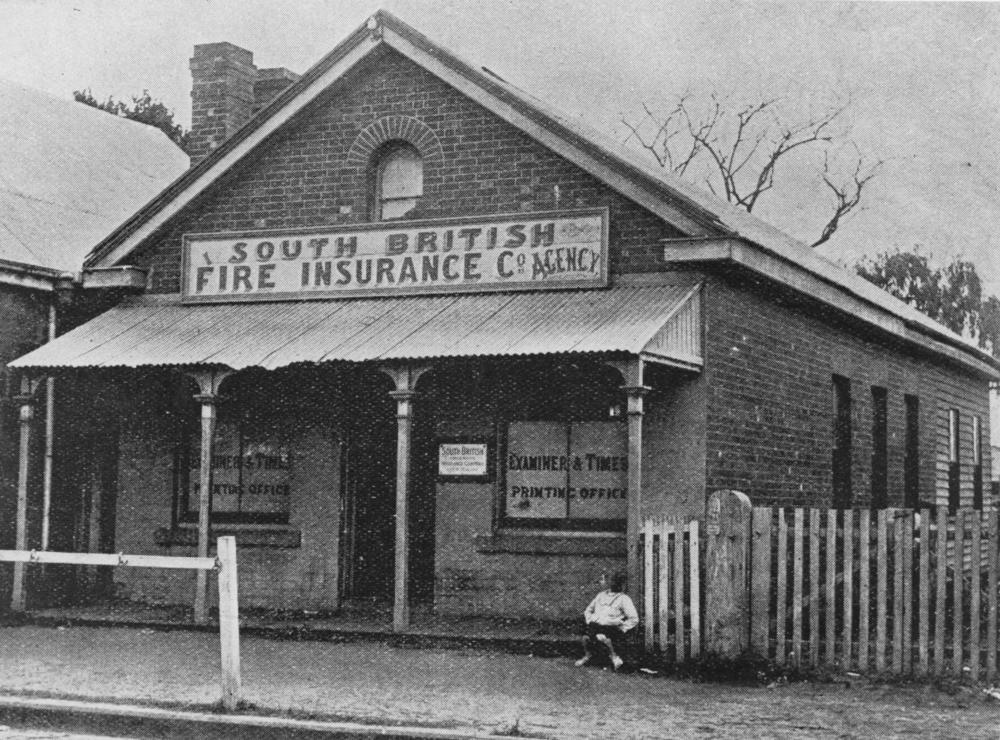
Examiner and Times newspaper office, Warwick, circa 1901

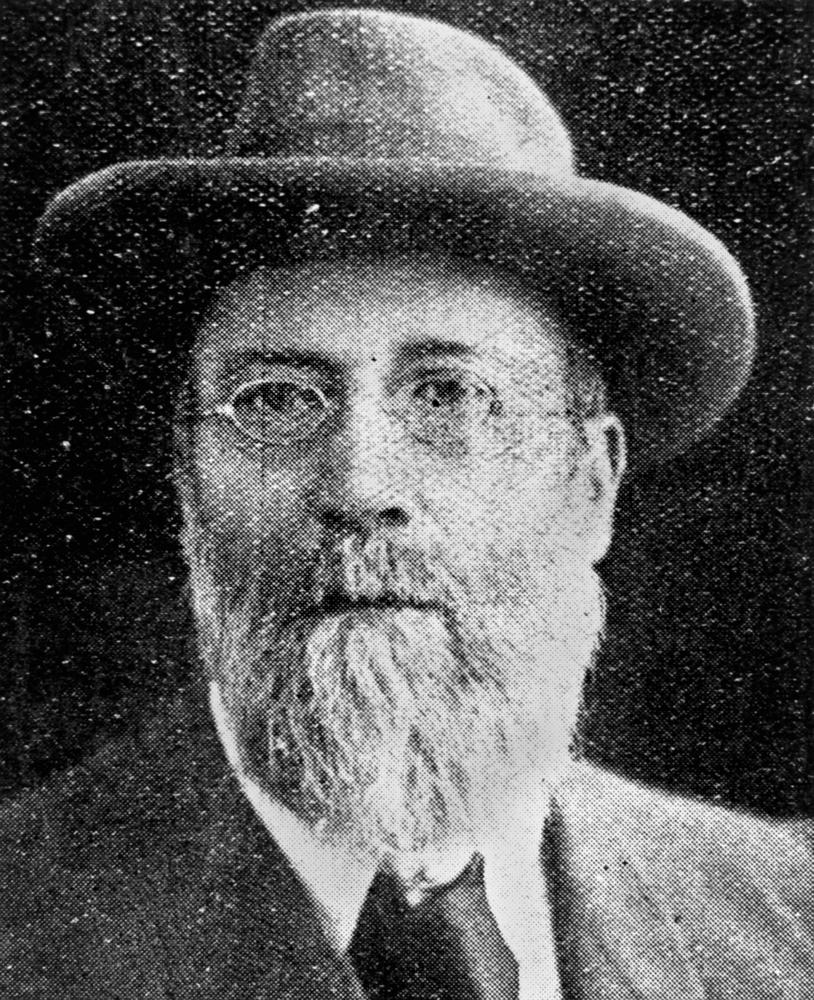
Samuel Irwin, proprietor of the Warwick Examiner and Times, Warwick, 1901

Established circa 1864, the Warwick Examiner and Times was printed on Tuesday, Thursday and Saturday. Also established in 1864, the Warwick Argus published on opposing days i.e. Monday, Wednesday and Friday. Ultimately, in 1919, an opportunity to combine and publish daily was realized with the Examiner purchasing the Argus and the Warwick Daily News was formed.

In 1968, the owners, the Dunn family, decided to amalgamate with a number of other newspaper owners to create the Provincial Newspapers (QLD) Ltd company.

Along with many other regional Australian newspapers owned by NewsCorp, the newspaper ceased print editions in June 2020 and became an online-only publication.

== Digitisation ==
The paper has been digitised as part of the Australian Newspapers Digitisation Program of the National Library of Australia.

== See also ==
- List of newspapers in Australia
