= Central Queensland News =

- Type: Online newspaper
- Format: Digital
- Owner: News Corp Australia
- Founded: 1937
- Headquarters: Emerald, Queensland, Australia
- Website: www.cqnews.com.au

The Central Queensland News is an online newspaper located in Emerald, Queensland, Australia.

From 1937 to 2020, the CQ News was published as a print edition, providing coverage of local news and events from the Central Highlands and Isaac regions of Central Queensland. Following the cessation of the print edition in June 2020, the newspaper has continued to provide news for these regions on its website.

The Central Queensland News is owned by News Corp Australia.

== History ==
Vera Gibson and her family founded the newspaper in 1937.

In May 2020, News Corp announced that the Central Queensland News would be one of many of its regional newspapers to stop publishing the print edition and move to an exclusively-online format, with local news continuing to be delivered on the website to readers who paid for an online subscription.

The final print edition of the Central Queensland News was published on 26 June 2020.
