= NewsMail =

Online newspaper based in Bundaberg, Queensland, Australia

- Type: Online newspaper
- Owner: News Corp Australia
- Editor: Shelley Strachan
- Founded: 1925
- Language: English
- Headquarters: Bundaberg, Queensland, Australia; 36-38 Woondooma St; Bundaberg QLD 4670
- Circulation: Monday - Friday: 6500; Saturday: 9300
- Website: news-mail.com.au

The NewsMail is an online newspaper based in Bundaberg, Queensland, Australia. It has a wide range of content including domestic and international affairs. The paper has a long, notable history, starting as a family business and more recently becoming part of the regional network of News Corp Australia, the largest Australian newspaper publisher. It shut down its printed edition and became online-only in June 2020.

== History ==
Thomas White, the founder of NewsMail, first named the newspaper the Burnett Argus in 1861. In 1869, White moved publishing to Maryborough and changed the name to The Maryborough Mail. In 1872, the publisher moved and renamed the newspaper again to the Mount Perry Mail. Later on, The Mount Perry Mail moved to Bundaberg and became The Bundaberg Mail. Several newspapers were published weekly in Bundaberg between 1880 and 1900, but by the early 20th century two tri-weeklies divided the market: The Mail and its competitor The Star.

In 1907, The Bundaberg Mail became the city’s first daily newspaper. In 1917, Sidney H. Barton purchased the newspaper title, and its city freehold. A merger was announced in July 1925, with the Bundaberg Mail and the Bundaberg News to become the Bundaberg Daily News and Mail from August onwards. In 1942, the paper changed the name to the Bundaberg News-Mail and in the 2000s the hyphen was removed. In 1993, The NewsMail bought the Guardian, Bundy’s weekly community paper.

During the Great Depression, the number of partners diminished, and the owners discussed options to merge with other newspapers with different financial specialists and investors. In 1958, Muriel Cooper Barton, in partnership with her daughter Betty Young and Betty’s husband Colin Young, approached A. Dunn and Co, owners of the Maryborough Chronicle, Toowoomba Chronicle, and Rockhampton’s Morning Bulletin, offering to sell them her 51.6 percent stake in the NewsMail. In 1961, the NewsMail was acquired by a partnership of eight provincial dailies. After the takeover of the daily Cairns Post by Queensland Press Ltd (publishers of the Brisbane Courier-Mail) in 1965, the eight other Queensland newspapers set up a holding company, Provincial Investments Pty Ltd (later Provincial Newspapers and eventually APN). This holding company included notable families such as the Dunns (Maryborough, Toowoomba, and Rockhampton), Mannings (Mackay), Irwins (Warwick) and the Stephensons, Parkinsons, and Kippens (Ipswich). Rockhampton was selected to be the company’s head office, and Lex Dunn, a lawyer who advised on the company structure, became the chief executive.

On July 27, 1970, NewsMail was first newspaper in Queensland and the second in Australia to publish computerised photoset design and digitally offset printing. In 1970, NewsMail’s headquarters moved to Brisbane, in an office building on the corner of Queen and Albert streets. NewsMail transferred its Bundaberg office from Targo St, where it had been for 70 years, to new premises in Woondooma St.

In 2013, the worst flood in Bundaberg's history immersed the NewsMail office causing major damage and disruption. All of NewsMail chronicles including photos and other important material were pulverized (Turnbull, 2020). Even so NewsMail's staff continued to gather news in the region, recording the dramatic scenes in North Bundaberg where the flood caused the breakdown of a part of the Tallon Bridge.

In 2016, News Corp bought Queensland’s regional newspaper businesses from Here, There & Everywhere (formerly known as APN News and Media). NewsMail remains a branch of News Corp.

In 2019, NewsMail moved from 405mm tabloid to 350mm tabloid format. The printed newspaper was published Monday to Saturday until 25 June 2020.

As well as serving Bundaberg, the NewsMail was available in coastal communities including Bargara, Elliott Heads, Moore Park, Burnett Heads and the Bundaberg Port. It also reached the surrounding rural communities of Miriam Vale and Agnes Water in the north, Mundubbera, Gayndah, Eidsvold to the west, and Childers and Biggenden.

=== Title history ===
Approximate Dates	issue numbering	ISSN	Titling
1862–1869			Burnett Argus: Gayndah and Central Queensland Advertiser
1869–1870			Maryborough Mail
1872–1875			Mount Perry Mail and Mining Times, Burnett, Wide Bay and Bundaberg Advertiser Title varies: 25th Jan.-18 July 1872, The Mount Perry Mail, Burnett, Wide Bay and Bundaberg Advertiser.
1876–1892	No. 203 - No. 1970		Bundaberg and Mount Perry Mail and General Advertiser
12 December 1892 – 1917	No. 1971 -	2205-1643 (print) 2205-1651 (online)	Bundaberg Mail and Burnett Advertiser
1917–1925	Vol. 47, no. 6374 -	2205-166X (print) 2205-1678 (online)	Bundaberg Mail
1925–1940		2205-782X	Bundaberg Daily News and Mail Merged with: Bundaberg Daily News, to form Bundaberg Daily News and Mail.
8 July 1940 – 14 November 1942	Vol. 33, no. 167 - Vol. 35, no. 272	2205-9059	Bundaberg Daily News-Mail
1942–1961			Bundaberg News-Mail
1961– 27 June 2020			News-Mail (Bundaberg, Qld.)
June 2020–			NewsMail. News Corp cancels print publication of several regional newspapers and makes them online only.

== Content ==
NewsMail covers a wide range of events including local, national, and international news. Their main headlines are sport, lifestyle, community, jobs, motoring, real estates, obituaries, and classifieds. NewsMail is community-focused, delivering the daily latest news to the local communities including coastal and rural Queensland. NewsMail has established a reputation to meet the community’s demand and reflect their lifestyle.

Queensland's public sector information policy reform process states that journalists are the link to channel policy information to citizens, which means NewsMail not only report on issues but also they get to participate in policy development first hand, and whether this experience is good or bad it becomes a story in its own right. Regional and small publishers like NewsMail have limited resources to cover policy issues.

== Products ==
=== Printed newspaper ===
The printed newspaper version was first published in 1938 under the name News-Mail, as a daily newspaper from Monday to Saturday every week. According to NewsMail, 40% of Bundaberg residents subscribed to daily newspapers from Monday to Friday, and on Saturday 5% more.

In 2015, NewsMail copy sales ranked 9th of all the nation’s daily newspapers, averaging 8461 copies a day. Average NewsMail readership approached 36 000 on weekdays and 38 000 on Saturdays, including print, digital and connected devices.

In April 2020, News Corp announced that it would suspend many of its rural newspapers as the outbreak of COVID-19 caused economic conditions and advertisement revenue to deteriorate rapidly. The company announced that it would cease printing activities at most of its locations until the end of June 2020, but would continue to publish its 14 daily newspapers. NewsMail followed other Queensland’s newspapers such as Mackay’s Daily Mercury, Gladstone’s Observer, Queensland Times, Sunshine Coast Daily, Rockhampton’s Morning Bulletin, Chinchilla News, Dalby Herald, Gatton Star, Noosa News, South Burnett Times, Stanthorpe Border Post, Western Star, Western Times, Whitsunday Times, Whitsunday Coast Guardian and Bowen Independent to become digital-only newspapers (Meade, 2020). The last issue of print newspaper was printed on Saturday, June 25, 2020.

=== Digital newspaper ===
NewsMail introduced the digital newspaper with immediate access to daily content with a distinct focus on local current affairs and relevant news from national to international matters. The digital is described as an interactive, inclusive, user-friendly online town center for all the Queensland and northern New South Wales particularly and Australian citizens in general.

=== News app ===
In approximately 2019, NewsMail created its own namesake local news app for tablets and mobile phones for readers to follow topics and receive news notifications. In April 2021, the app was discontinued as it was outdated. Readers were instead encouraged to download The Courier Mail app for coverage of Queensland news.

== Awards ==
In 1980, News-Mail's Frank Davis received a Walkley Award for Best Story in a Provincial Newspaper.

In 2000, NewsMail staff won the Walkley Award for Coverage of Suburban or Regional Affairs for their Childers backpacker fire article. During the time of the biggest news story in the history of the city, Rod Rehbein was editor of the magazine.

== Directors ==
In 1925, director-editor Steve Walker died. Sidney Barton became the proprietor and editor of Bundaberg News & Mail until his death in 1931.

Muriel Hooper Barton was appointed as the Daily News & Mail’s director and office manager; Jack Cecil Brady was managing director.

In 1965, NewsMail director Carl Nielson wrote a letter to Mr. Manning called for action to prevent a takeover by Queensland Press Pty Ltd (publishers of the Brisbane Courier-Mail). Several family firms including NewsMail remained as part of Australian Provincial Newspapers Ltd.

In 1992, Malcolm Smith replaced Roy Theodore to become general manager.

In 2007, Wayne Tomkins replaced Russell Lister and became general manager.

In 2011, Angus Irwin was appointed general manager.

Till 2020, Megan Sheehan was appointed Editor of NewsMail and Ingrid Barham appointed Chief Executive Officer. Shelley Strachan is now the Editor of the NewsMail and several other mastheads across the Wide Bay.

== See also ==
- List of newspapers in Australia
