= Frederick Augustus Morgan =

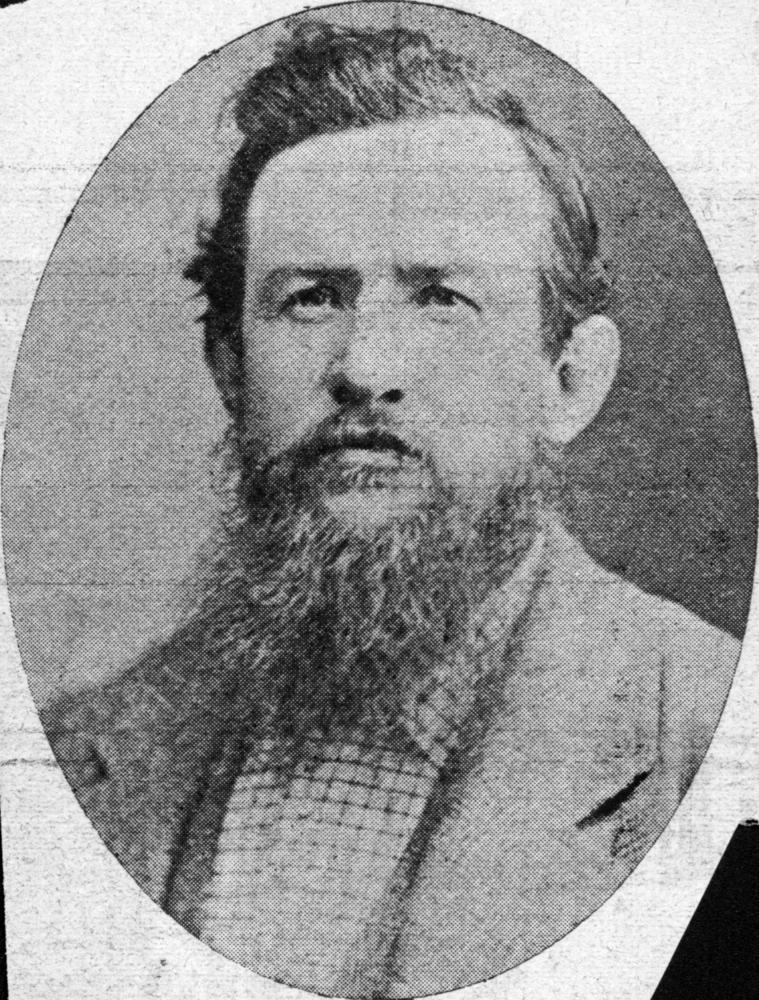
Frederick Augustus Morgan (March 1897)

Frederick Augustus Morgan (20 June 1837 – 8 November 1894) was an Australian publican and mining investor, co-discoverer of the Mount Morgan Mine.

== Early life ==
Morgan was born in Sydney, New South Wales, Australia, spent his boyhood in Bathurst, New South Wales, and commenced life as a digger by joining with his uncle, John Woodward, who made the discovery which led to the Ophir, New South Wales rush, in 1851. After working with success there and at Golden Point, Victoria and Golden Valley, he migrated to Warwick, Queensland, in 1866, and engaged in mining at Thanes' Creek, and tinning at Stanthorpe, and was successful.

== Career around Rockhampton ==
Morgan reached Rockhampton, Queensland, in December 1879, and, after some prospecting, opened the Gallawa reef, near Mount Wheeler, and worked it for some years. He was then joined by his brothers—Thomas Squire Morgan, and Edwin Francis Morgan—and with them formed a prospecting party, which resulted in the discovery of Mount Morgan—the richest gold mine in the world at the time. Morgan, who was largely interested in pastoral properties, was an Alderman of Rockhampton, and was prominently identified with local affairs in that town. Morgan was mayor of Rockhampton 1891 to 1893.

Morgan died in Rockhampton, Queensland, on 8 November 1894, survived by his wife and one son.
