= The Observer (Gladstone) =

Australian newspaper

- Type: Newspaper
- Format: Tabloid
- Owner: News Corp Australia
- Founded: 1867
- Language: English
- Headquarters: Gladstone, Queensland, Australia; 130 Auckland Street; Gladstone QLD 4680
- Circulation: 7,171 Monday-Friday; 9,701 Saturday
- Price: A$1.00 Monday-Friday; A$1.40 Saturday
- Website: gladstoneobserver.com.au

The Observer is an online newspaper serving Gladstone, Queensland in Australia.

The newspaper is owned by News Corp Australia and is published from Monday to Saturday.

The circulation of The Observer is 7,171 Monday to Friday and 9,701 on Saturday.

The Observer website is part of News Corp Australia's News Regional Media network.

== History ==
Prior to June 2020, The Observer was circulated to Gladstone and the area from the west to Biloela and south to Agnes Water and The Town Of 1770.

Along with many other regional Australian newspapers owned by NewsCorp, The Observer ceased print editions in June 2020 and became an online-only publication.

== See also ==
- List of newspapers in Australia
