= News Corp Australia =

Australian media conglomerate

- Type: Subsidiary
- Industry: Mass media
- Predecessor: News Limited
- Founded: 1923; 103 years ago, in Adelaide, South Australia
- Founder: James Edward Davidson
- Headquarters: Surry Hills, Sydney, Australia
- Area served: Australia; New Zealand
- Key people: Michael Miller (executive chairman)
- Products: Newspapers; Magazines; Internet
- Services: Pay television National Rugby League; Market research DVD and film distribution Film and television production
- Parent: News Corp (First and second incarnations)
- Subsidiaries: Brisbane Broncos (69%); Australian News Channel (News24)
- Website: newscorpaustralia.com

News Corp Australia is an Australian media conglomerate and wholly owned subsidiary of News Corp.

The group's interests span newspaper and magazine publishing, Internet, market research, DVD and film distribution, and film and television production trading assets. News Pty Ltd (formerly News Limited) is the holding company of the group.

Until the formation of News Corporation in 1979, News Limited was the principal holding company for the business interests of Rupert Murdoch and his family. Since then, News Limited had been wholly owned by News Corporation. In 2004, News Corporation announced its intention to reincorporate to the United States. On 3 November 2004, News Corp Limited ceased trading on the Australian Securities Exchange; and on 8 November, News Corporation began trading on the New York Stock Exchange. On 28 June 2013, News Corporation was split into two separate companies. Murdoch's newspaper interests became News Corp, which was the new parent company of News Limited. The group adopted the new News Corp Australia name following the listing of the new News Corp on 1 July 2013.

== History ==
Evolution of News Corp
- 1952: Rupert Murdoch inherited the News tabloid from his father and used it to develop a media conglomerate
- 1954: After acquiring News Limited, Murdoch purchased and established dozens of newspapers throughout Australia
- 1960s: News Limited began to expand globally and bought out several British tabloids like The Sun and News of the World
- 1980: To manage its growing operations, News Corporation was incorporated as the holding company for News Limited
- 1981: News International was formed to manage News Corp's British properties
- 1985: News Corporation officially expanded beyond print media and acquired the 20th Century-Fox film studio
- 1986: Metromedia stations were used to launch the Fox Broadcasting Network
- 1990: Fox Entertainment Group was established to manage News Corp's filmed entertainment properties
- Mid 1990s: Fox Sports and Fox News were launched, with both becoming leaders in cable news and sports programming
- 2004: News Corp relocated from its long time Adelaide headquarters to New York City at 1211 Avenue of Americas
- 2007: Dow Jones & Company was acquired, giving News Corp financial news outlets like the The Wall Street Journal
- 2013: Following controversies involving the News of the World in 2011, investors pushed for changes, leading to the second News Corp and 21st Century Fox
- 2019: The Walt Disney Company acquired majority of 21st Century Fox, while the remaining news, sports, and broadcast units became Fox Corporation
- 2023: Attempts to remerge News Corp and Fox were explored but later withdrawn

=== Early days ===
News Limited was established in 1923 by James Edward Davidson and funded by the Collins Group mining empire for the purpose of publishing anti-union propaganda, when he purchased the Broken Hill Barrier Miner and the Port Pirie Recorder. He went on to purchase Adelaide's weekly Mail and to found The News, a daily newspaper in Adelaide, South Australia.

=== Murdochs ===
Sir Keith Murdoch acquired a minority interest in the company in 1949. Following his death in 1952, his son Rupert Murdoch inherited The News, which has been described by Murdoch biographer Bruce Page as the "foundation stone" of News Limited (and News Corporation). His first television station was Limited's NWS 9, launched in 1958 in Adelaide, having been granted an exclusive licence after arguing for monopoly before the control board. He was aided by the Masonic Grand Lodge of Adelaide. The station would be charged with seditious libel in its outset.

Over the next few years, Murdoch gradually established himself as one of the most dynamic media proprietors in Australia, quickly expanding his holdings by acquiring a string of daily and suburban newspapers in most capital cities, including the Sydney afternoon paper, The Daily Mirror, as well as a small Sydney-based recording company, Festival Records. His acquisition of the Mirror proved crucial to his success, allowing him to challenge the dominance of his two main rivals in the Sydney market, the Fairfax Newspapers group, which published the hugely profitable Sydney Morning Herald, and Consolidated Press Holdings, owned by Frank Packer, which published the city's leading tabloid paper, The Daily Telegraph.

In 1964, News Limited made its next important advance when it established The Australian, Australia's first national daily newspaper, based initially in Canberra and later in Sydney. The Australian, a broadsheet, gave News Limited a new respectability as a quality newspaper publisher, and also greater political influence since The Australian has always had an elite readership, if not always a large circulation.

Also in 1964, News Limited made Rupert Murdoch's first overseas newspaper investment – a 29.57 percent stake in the Wellington Publishing Company, subsequently part of Independent Newspapers Limited, INL, New Zealand's largest publishing group. The News Limited holding in INL fluctuated over the years and was just over 49 percent in 1997. The INL business was bought by News Limited's main rival in 2003 – Fairfax Media.

Over the next ten years, as his press empire grew, Murdoch established a hugely lucrative financial base, and these profits were routinely used to subsidise further acquisitions. In his early years of newspaper ownership Murdoch was an aggressive, micromanaging entrepreneur. His standard tactic was to buy loss-making Australian newspapers and turn them around by introducing radical management and editorial changes and fighting no-holds-barred circulation wars with his competitors. By the 1970s, this power base was so strong that Murdoch was able to acquire leading newspapers and magazines in both London and New York, as well as many other media holdings.

To gain subscriptions for its new pay television business, News Limited recruited rugby league football administrators, clubs and players to form a new competition, sparking the mid-1990s Super League war.

On 12 July 2006, News Limited announced the creation of a new division, News Digital Media, to manage the operations of the news site news.com.au; the online marketplace sites, CarsGuide, truelocal.com.au and careerone.com.au as well as the partly owned realestate.com.au, foxsports.com.au and related activities involving Foxtel and the company's newspapers and the Australian versions of Fox Interactive Media sites Myspace and IGN. Chairman and chief executive of News Limited, John Hartigan, announced the appointment of Richard Freudenstein as chief executive of the division.

In February 2018, News Corp Australia announced a partnership with Taboola to launch an integrated native content creation, booking and distribution platform. The Taboola Feed will be implemented on desktop, mobile, web and in-app across the News Corp Australia digital network.

=== Corporate changes ===
In 2000 John Hartigan was appointed Chief Executive Officer, replacing Lachlan Murdoch. and added chairman to his role in 2005. During his time in the roles, he presided over a number of controversies, included Eatock v Bolt, the court case following News Ltd journalist Andrew Bolt breaching the Racial Discrimination Act, and an unfair dismissal case brought by former Herald Sun editor Bruce Guthrie. On 30 November 2011, Hartigan left News Ltd, and owner Rupert Murdoch took on the role of chairman, while former Foxtel executive Kim Williams took on the role of CEO.

On 28 June 2013, News Corporation split into two publicly traded companies focused on publishing, and broadcasting/media respectively. At this time News Limited was renamed News Corp Australia and became part of the publishing company, News Corp, with Wall Street Journal editor Robert Thomson replacing Rupert Murdoch as CEO. Murdoch remained a chairman and major shareholder for both companies.

On 9 August 2013 it was announced that Julian Clarke would replace Kim Williams as the CEO of News Corp Australia.

On 9 June 2015, it was announced that Peter Tonagh would replace Julian Clarke as the CEO, with Michael Miller to be appointed to the role of Executive Chairman. Peter Tonagh and Michael Miller's first day in their new roles was 16 November 2015.

== Acquisitions ==
=== Britain ===
Murdoch moved to Britain and rapidly became a major force there after his acquisitions of the News of the World, and The Sun in 1969 and The Times and The Sunday Times in 1981, which he bought from the Thomson family. Both takeovers further reinforced his growing reputation as a ruthless and cunning business operator. His takeover of The Times aroused great hostility among traditionalists, who feared he would take it "downmarket." This led directly to the founding of The Independent in 1986 as an alternative quality daily.

=== United States ===
Murdoch made his first acquisition in the United States in 1973, when he purchased the San Antonio News. Soon afterwards he founded the National Star, a supermarket tabloid, and in 1976 he purchased the New York Post. Subsequent acquisitions were undertaken through News Corporation.

=== Australia ===
News Limited expanded its newspaper holdings in 1987 when it acquired The Herald and Weekly Times, which published two newspapers in Melbourne (in 1990 these papers would be combined to form the Herald Sun) as well as large stakes in several other newspaper publishers. News Limited went on to acquire the remaining shares of Brisbane's Queensland Newspapers (owner of The Courier-Mail), Adelaide's Advertiser Newspapers (owner of The Advertiser) and Hobart's Davies Brothers (owner of The Mercury).

In 1991, News Limited spun off its longtime magazine house, Southdown Press, as Pacific Magazines and Printing, and sold the former Advertiser magazines, renamed Murdoch Magazines, to Matt Handbury. News Limited re-entered the magazine market in 2000 with the start of News Magazines. In 2006, News Limited returned to being a major player in the Australian magazine business with the purchase of Independent Print Media Group's FPC Magazines (Delicious, Super Food Ideas, Vogue Australia).

Nationwide News is a subsidiary of News Corp Australia. It was involved in Nationwide News Pty Ltd v Wills in the High Court of Australia in 1992. In 2018 it was ordered by the Federal Court to pay damages to actor Geoffrey Rush after The Daily Telegraph published a front-page article alleging that Rush engaged in "inappropriate behaviour" on stage with actress Eryn Jean Norvill during the Sydney Theatre Company's 2015 production of King Lear.

== Influence in Australia ==
Murdoch's desire for dominant cross-media ownership manifested in early 1961 when he bought an ailing Australian record label, Festival Records, and within a few years it had become the leading local recording company. He also bought a television station in Wollongong, New South Wales, hoping to use it to break into the Sydney television market, but found himself frustrated by Australia's cross-media ownership laws, which prevented him from owning both a major newspaper and television station in the same city. Since then he has consistently lobbied, both personally and through his papers, to have these laws changed in his favour. This occurred in 2006 when the Liberal-National Coalition government, having gained control of both houses of the Australian Parliament, introduced reforms to cross-media ownership and foreign media ownership laws. The laws came into effect in early 2007, with further changes in 2017 abolishing 'two out of three' restrictions that had previously prevented news companies from owning newspaper, radio, and television services within the same city.

In 2001 News Corp Australia had nearly three-quarters of daily metropolitan newspaper circulation and so maintained great influence in Australia. Internal News Corp Australia documents reveal a brazen offer during the 2001 federal election campaign to promote the policies of the Australian Labour Party (ALP) in its best-selling newspapers nationwide for almost A$500,000. Other documents include a marginal seats guide written by a senior business manager for internal use. It evidences a corporate strategy to target marginal seats at the 2004 election. Some of the documents appeared on Media Watch.

Murdoch wanted a way to influence politics in his native land. He saw a way to do that through the News Corp publication The Australian. The national daily has been used to support Murdoch's political interests over time, such as John McEwen with the National Party of Australia and Gough Whitlam with the Australian Labor Party. According to the Finkelstein Review of Media and Media Regulation, in 2011 the group accounted for 23% of the newspaper titles in Australia. As of 2021, it owns seven of the country's 12 national or capital city daily (print) newspapers (that is, 58 per cent; excludes weekend papers). In the capital cities of Adelaide, Brisbane, Darwin, and Hobart, there are no other print dailies. However a 2020 report showed that only 25% of news consumed is obtained from print newspapers, with TV being the top source, online second, and social media third. By early 2021, News Corp had either dropped, or made online only, many of its local newspapers. At that time, it was publishing fewer than 20 print newspapers, and around 85 online titles.

In 2016, News Corp commanded 65% of national and capital city daily (print) newspapers. However, its news website news.com.au ranks second after the ABC News website on visitor count, and its individual newspaper websites do not match several digital-only ones. In December 2020, all of News Corp's news websites reached 1.2 million fewer readers than those owned by Nine Entertainment. The company owns just one television news outlet, Sky News Australia, which does not have a large audience on TV; however, its Facebook posts are shared prolifically, and its subscribers on YouTube, by 2021, not only far outnumbered those of Channel 7 and Channel 9 but had surpassed ABC News.

In 2018 the company's sites included news.com.au, Business Spectator and Eureka Report, Kidspot.com.au, taste.com.au, and homelife.com.au. It had a 55% stake in CarsGuide, which was sold in 2016, a share in REA Group that operates realestate.com.au, as well as websites for most newspaper and magazine titles. The company's other Australian assets include Australian News Channel, 65% ownership of subscription television provider Foxtel, (which in turn owns Fox Sports Australia) and shares in the Brisbane Broncos NRL team.

A parliamentary petition initiated by former Prime Minister Kevin Rudd for a Royal Commission investigating the diversity and integrity of print media, focused primarily on News Corp, raised more than 500,000 signatures in November 2020.

Before 2010 News Corp Australia media was more politically flexible, but have become much more rigid as Lachlan Murdoch's influence at the company has grown – as of 2024, The Australian has endorsed the Liberal Party at each of the past five federal elections, while none of the four daily metros have endorsed Labor since at least 2010.

== Unethical conduct ==
In the wake of the News International phone hacking scandal in the United Kingdom, in July 2011 News Limited announced a review of all payments in the previous three years. On 22 July it was reported that two retired Victorian Supreme Court judges, Frank Vincent AO QC and Bernard Teague AO, were appointed to act as independent assessors of the conduct of the review and also assess the outcome. The editorial and financial review concluded in early November and found no evidence of phone hacking or payments to public officials, with Vincent and Teague declaring that the review process did not bring ".....to light any systemic issues with respect to the making of payments to third parties and any substantial amounts paid to individuals in respect of illegitimate activities." Despite this the Australian division of News Corp has not entirely escaped scandal with allegations in 2012 that News Corp subsidiary, News Datacom Systems (NDS) had used hackers to undermine pay TV rivals around the world, including Australia. Some of the victims of the alleged hacking, such as Austar were later taken over by News Corp and others such as Ondigital later went bust. NDS had originally been set up to provide security to News Corp's pay TV interests but emails obtained by Fairfax Media revealed they had also pursued a wider agenda by distributing the keys to rival set top box operators and seeking to obtain phone records of suspected rivals. The emails were from the hard drive of NDS European chief, Ray Adams. It was also revealed that Australian Federal police were working with UK police to investigate hacking by News Corp.

== Holdings ==
News Corp Australia operates 170 newspaper and magazine titles in Australia, including the following:

=== Newspapers ===
==== National ====
- The Australian including weekly insert magazine The Deal and monthly insert magazine (wish)
  - The Weekend Australian including insert magazine The Weekend Australian Magazine
- The Weekly Times – a weekly national rural tabloid aimed at farmers

==== Metropolitan ====
New South Wales

- The Daily Telegraph
  - The Sunday Telegraph including insert magazine sunday magazine
- mX (Sydney) (ceased publication 12 June 2015)
- The Sportsman

Victoria

- Herald Sun
  - Sunday Herald Sun including insert magazine sundaymagazine
- mX (Melbourne) (ceased publication 12 June 2015)

Queensland

- The Courier-Mail including weekly insert magazine QWeekend
  - The Sunday Mail
- The Daily Sun (1982–1988), from 1988 The Sun, now ceased publication
- Gold Coast Bulletin
- mX (Brisbane) (ceased publication 12 June 2015)

South Australia

- The Advertiser including the monthly insert the Adelaide* magazine
  - Sunday Mail

Tasmania

- The Mercury
  - The Sunday Tasmanian

Northern Territory

- Northern Territory News
  - The Sunday Territorian

==== Community ====
Sydney

- NewsLocal (formerly Cumberland-Courier Community Newspapers)
  - Inner West Courier
  - North Shore Times
  - The Manly Daily
  - Central Coast Express Advocate

Melbourne

- Leader Community Newspapers

Brisbane

- Quest Community Newspapers

Adelaide

- Messenger Newspapers (ceased publication May 2020, content now included on The Advertiser website)

==== Regional ====
New South Wales

- Tweed Daily News
- Coffs Coast Advocate

South Australia

- Messenger Newspapers (ceased publication May 2020, content now included on The Advertiser website)

Tasmania

- Tasmanian Country

Victoria

- Geelong Advertiser
  - Geelong News

Queensland

- Gold Coast Bulletin
- Townsville Bulletin
  - Tablelander
  - Innisfail Advocate
  - Burdekin Advocate
  - The Northern Miner
  - Herbert River Express
- The Cairns Post
  - Tablelands Advertiser
- The Daily Mercury
- Central Queensland News
- The Morning Bulletin
- Central Telegraph
- The Observer
- NewsMail
- Fraser Coast Chronicle
- The Gympie Times
- The Sunshine Coast Daily
- The Queensland Times
- The Chronicle
- Warwick Daily News
- The Dalby Herald
- Chinchilla News and Murilla Advertiser
- The Western Star

=== Magazines ===
- GQ Australia
- Vogue Australia
- Vogue Living
- Australian Golf Digest
- Super Food Ideas
- Delicious
- Big League
- Taste.com.au Magazine

=== Websites ===
- News.com.au publishes stories and multimedia created by a team of about 51 reporters.
- The Punch was an opinion and news website, founded in 2009 and merged with news.com.au in March 2013
- Business Spectator is a business news website
- Escape.com.au, a prominent Australian travel and tourism media
- Punters.com.au, an Australian horse racing news and form guide website
- Racenet.com.au, Australia's Premier Horse Racing News, Form Guides & Tips
- KidSpot, a parenting website
- Realestate.com.au, Buy, rent and sell property
- Code Sports, sports news website

=== Gambling ===
- Betr (33%)

=== Sport ===
- Brisbane Broncos (69%)

=== Television ===
- Australian News Channel
  - News24
  - News24 World
  - News24 Weather

== News Awards ==
News Corp holds annual award events to recognise its journalists, known as the News Awards. The top award is known as the Sir Keith Murdoch Award for Excellence in Journalism.

== See also ==
- Journalism in Australia
- List of NRL club owners
