= The Morning Bulletin =

Newspaper in Queensland, Australia

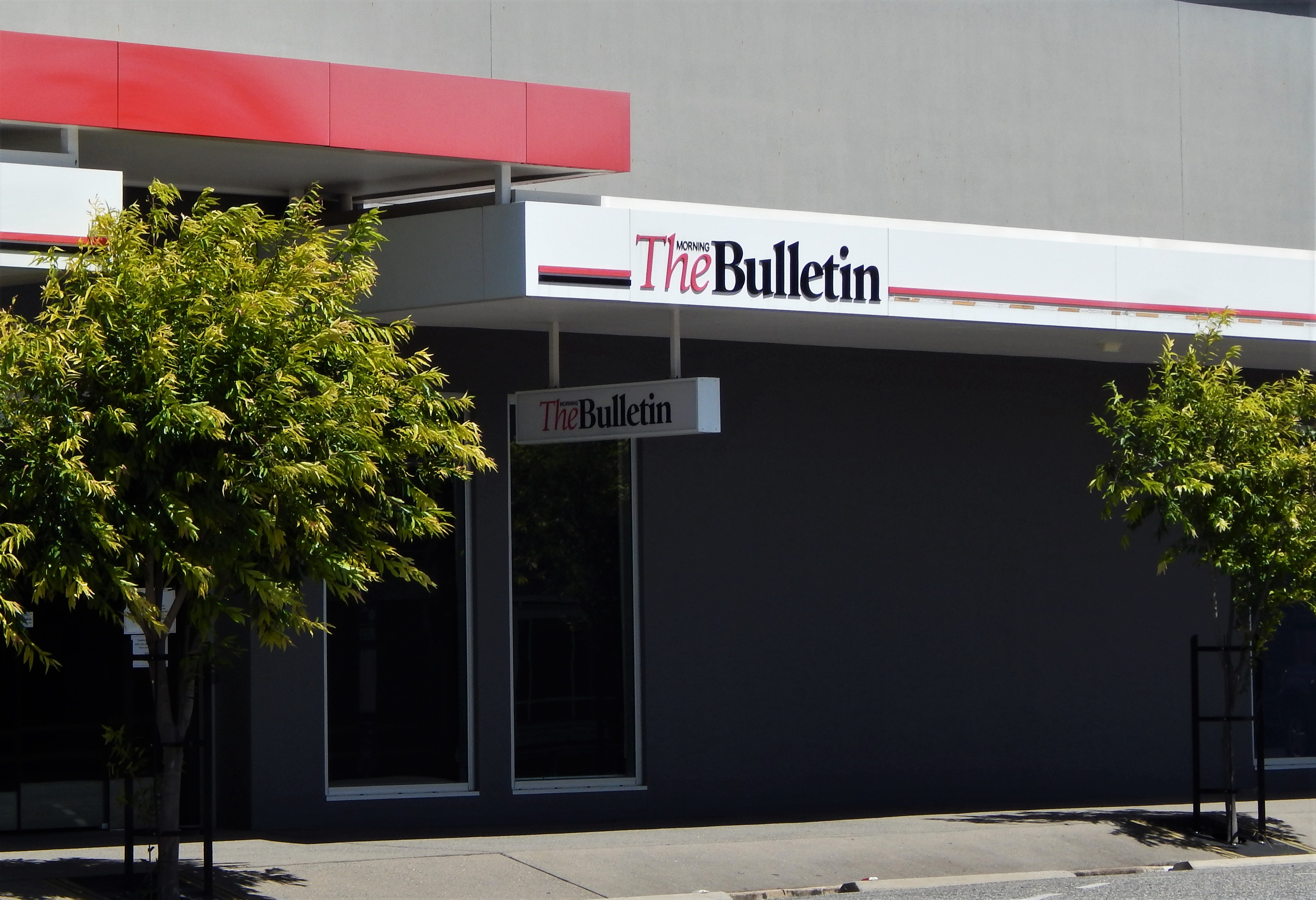
- Type: newspaper
- Format: Tabloid
- Owner: News Corp Australia
- Editor: Emma McBryde
- Founded: 9 July 1861
- Language: English
- Headquarters: Rockhampton, Australia; 220 Bolsover Street; Rockhampton City QLD 4700
- Circulation: 14,700 Monday–Friday; 50,000 Saturday
- Website: www.themorningbulletin.com.au

The Morning Bulletin is an online newspaper servicing the city of Rockhampton and the surrounding areas of Central Queensland, Australia.

From 1861 to 2020, The Morning Bulletin was published as a print edition, before then becoming an exclusively online newspaper.

The final print edition was published on 27 June 2020.

== History ==
The first issue of The Bulletin was launched on 9 July 1861. It is the second oldest business in Rockhampton, the oldest being the Criterion Hotel which was established in October 1860.

The founder and original owner, William Hitchcock Buzacott (1831–1880, brother of Charles Hardie Buzacott), brought the press and equipment from Sydney in 1861 where he operated a small weekly paper. At the time the paper was called the Rockhampton Bulletin and was eagerly read by the town's 698 residents.

The newspaper was published as The Rockhampton Bulletin and Central Queensland Advertiser from July 1861 to 14 January 1871. Then as The Rockhampton Bulletin from 1871 to 1878. From 1878 onwards the newspaper was published as The Morning Bulletin.

The Bulletin's original home was in Quay Street near the old Customs House, in a low wooden building. On 14 August 1862, this was burnt down and the presses destroyed. Buzacott quickly obtained new equipment from Sydney and the newspaper was re-established in a two-storey masonry building in Denham Street. By 1926, the Denham Street building was too small and the newspaper returned to Quay Street in their new (and now heritage-listed) Bulletin Building.

In 2007, the printing equipment that had been part of the newspaper's production facilities at the Bulletin Building were relocated to new printing facilities in Hempenstall Street in the Rockhampton suburb of Kawana, a more industrial part of the city.

After almost 88 years of newspaper staff working from the Bulletin Building, The Morning Bulletin ceased operating from the iconic three-storey building on 21 March 2014.

The newspaper temporarily relocated to an office at 35 Fitzroy Street opposite the City Centre Plaza shopping centre.

Despite The Morning Bulletin's editor Frazer Pearce favourably describing the building at 35 Fitzroy Street as "decades ahead" for the functionality of an evolving business, the newspaper only remained at the address for approximately six months.

After briefly working from 35 Fitzroy Street, The Morning Bulletin relocated again in late 2014 to their current location at 220 Bolsover Street, where the newspaper is currently produced from a small ground-level office in a building shared with the ANZ Bank, Bank of Queensland and Ray White Real Estate.

In August 2015, it was announced former Rockhampton resident Bevan Slattery had purchased the old Bulletin Building. At the time of purchase, Slattery said he didn't have any firm plans for the old newspaper building, but hoped to eventually create a space to expand his business while helping other start-up businesses.

In May 2020, it was announced The Morning Bulletin would be one of many regional newspapers owned by News Corp to cease publishing a print edition, moving to a digital-only edition, available to readers who paid for an online subscription.

However, prior to the final edition of The Morning Bulletin being printed, it was announced The Courier-Mail would commence a "regionalised" print edition which would feature selected stories from Central Queensland in compensation for the local print edition finishing.

The final print edition of The Morning Bulletin was published on 27 June 2020 after which the Rockhampton Print Centre was closed down.

The current editor of The Morning Bulletin is Emma McBryde, who replaced former editor Melanie Plane.

== Digitisation ==
Copies of the old newspapers up until the end of 1954 have been digitised as part of the Australian Newspapers Digitisation Program of the National Library of Australia.

== Controversies ==
=== "30,000 pigs" controversy ===
In 2011, The Morning Bulletin received criticism for not verifying an unusually high number when reporting on pigs being swept away in floodwaters from a farm near Baralaba, Queensland. The newspaper reported that a farmer claimed he had lost 30,000 pigs which had been swept down the Dawson River and into the Fitzroy River, which flows through Rockhampton.

The Morning Bulletin issued a retraction the following day, explaining that the reporter had misheard the farmer who had actually said he lost thirty sows and pigs, rather than 30,000 pigs.

The error and subsequent apology garnered widespread attention and was featured on the ABC's Media Watch program and was parodied on the ABC's comedy series Lowdown when Adam Zwar's character made the same mistake. Australian country performer Keith Jamieson also released a comedy recording centred around the newspaper's error, entitled "Thirty Sows & Pigs". The recording won "Best Comedy Release" at the 2016 Bungendore Country Music Muster & Awards in Bungendore, New South Wales.

The incident caught attention abroad. On 20 November 2015, the BBC comedy panel game show QI (Series M, Episode 5 - Maths) feature a segment on this. In 2011, a staffer at University of Pennsylvania commented that 30,000 pigs would be "biblical".

=== Clown controversy ===
On 27 October 2016, The Morning Bulletin made national news headlines when it depicted Australian Prime Minister Malcolm Turnbull as a clown, with an accompanying headline which read: "Stop Clowning Around Malcolm: It's time you got serious about giving CQ a Fair Go". A large illustration of Turnbull in a clown's costume was published on the front page of the newspaper's print edition, alongside an open letter from "The Morning Bulletin (on behalf of the people of Central Queensland)". The cartoon was also included in the online version of the letter.

The cartoon prompted Rockhampton mayor Margaret Strelow to publicly apologise to Turnbull during his scheduled visit to the city. In an interview on local radio station 4RO, Strelow told Turnbull that the illustration on the front page of the newspaper did not represent the general community and that Central Queenslanders were delighted to have him visit the region. Turnbull thanked Strelow for the apology but insisted it was not required.

The clown illustration in The Morning Bulletin came just days after the newspaper's former cartoonist Rod Emmerson had made international news headlines with his depiction of Michael Cheika as a clown in The New Zealand Herald. Emmerson's illustration provoked a strong defensive reaction from Cheika.
