= Murder of Phyllis Reiger =

1935 murder in Queensland, Australia

Phyllis Reiger
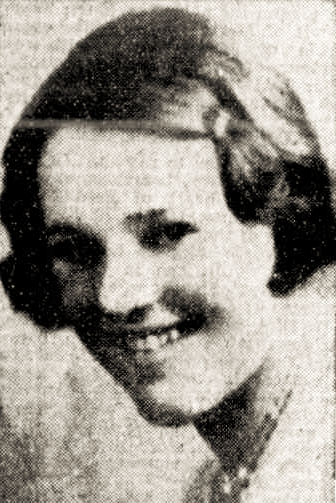
- Phyllis Reiger
- Born: Phyllis Muriel Frances Reiger; 24 March 1912; Mount Morgan, Queensland, Australia
- Died: 16 January 1935 (aged 22); Rockhampton, Queensland, Australia
- Cause of death: strangulation
- Burial place: North Rockhampton Cemetery
- Occupation: barmaid
- Employer: Excelsior Hotel

Phyllis Muriel Frances Reiger (24 March 1912 – 16 January 1935) was an Australian woman who was murdered by her former boyfriend, 42-year-old John Thomas "Jack" McQuade in Rockhampton, Queensland in the early hours of 16 January 1935.

The murder and the subsequent trial attracted considerable attention from the press.

== Early life ==
Phyllis Reiger was the only child of Peter Reiger and Elizabeth "Bessie" Reiger (née McClelland). Reiger was born in the gold mining town of Mount Morgan where her father was a mine foreman. But after she developed Bright's disease, the family moved to Rockhampton where Peter Reiger worked as a baker for a short time before purchasing a property called "Myravie" near Kalapa where Phyllis attended Kalapa State School.

Phyllis' condition worsened and was admitted to Tannachy Private Hospital where after receiving treatment her condition improved and she recovered.

Reiger turned 18 whilst living at "Myravie", with 50 guests attending a celebratory supper in Phyllis' honour on 2 April 1930.

Reiger eventually found work at the Excelsior Hotel, which was licensed by Charles Baker and his wife Alexia, who was Reiger's cousin (Elizabeth Reiger's niece). Reiger was initially employed as a babysitter for the Baker's young son Garrick but then began helping out in the bar.

=== Relationship with Jack McQuade ===
In early 1934, Phyllis Reiger began a relationship with 42-year-old Jack McQuade who was employed as a prison warder. He had been working at the Rockhampton Gaol but had also worked at Boggo Road Gaol in Brisbane for four years from 1928 to 1932.

They had discussed the possibility of marriage during their relationship.

However, McQuade and Reiger had a falling out for a period of time between October 1934 and December 1934, before reconciling.

By early January 1935, McQuade told Reiger that as she had not yet decided whether to marry him, he was prepared to marry another woman which caused Reiger to become defensive.

McQuade married May Ballinger at St Luke's Anglican Church in Rockhampton on the morning of 14 January 1935 before going to Yeppoon that afternoon where they spent the night.

== Night of the murder ==
According to evidence submitted during his murder trial, McQuade met with Reiger the night after he married Ballinger. Reiger asked McQuade to drive her to a local doctor for an appointment, after which McQuade drove Reiger back to the Excelsior Hotel so she could work a shift until the interval at the local picture theatres.

According to McQuade, while he waited for Reiger to finish her shift, he observed her collecting a concealed package.

When Reiger had finished her shift at around 9:30pm, McQuade drove her back to her address at 12 Oswald Street in Allenstown. Reiger then asked McQuade to drive her out to an isolated spot at Port Curtis, which he did.

According to McQuade, after he parked the car, Reiger climbed over into the back seat and asked McQuade to do the same. Noticing his reluctance, Reiger said "I won't keep you a couple of minutes. I will give you something to buck you up" as she pulled out a flask wrapped in brown paper.

Although McQuade told Reiger he didn't drink, he decided to take a drink from the flask after seeing her consume a mouthful.

After taking a swig from the flask, McQuade felt himself get stiff and broke out in a sweat. Reiger fell back, laughing hysterically. McQuade said he believed he had been poisoned.

In his evidence, McQuade said he thought he may have grabbed her to pull her towards him but was unsure whether he grabbed her throat. McQuade also told the court he was unable to remember anything until he woke up in hospital, and that included how he got back to the Campbell Street boarding house where he lived.

However, Senior Sergeant Julius Henry Albeitz testified that McQuade had said during a bedside interview at the hospital: "She gave me a drink and as soon as I drank it, I saw black. I grabbed her by the throat and when I let her go, she was dead." According to Albeitz, McQuade had said that Reiger had informed him that she was pregnant for which she blamed him, and that McQuade had said: "We were rowing. She kept blaming me. She slapped my face and I got wild and lost my block."

McQuade was taken to hospital by ambulance at around 3:15am where he was admitted with a suspected case of poisoning. McQuade's stomach was washed out and the contents delivered to the police for analysis. In evidence presented to the court, it was revealed that there was no trace of poison in McQuade's stomach contents, but there had been a hundredth of a grain of strychnine discovered of Phyllis Reiger's stomach contents. The medical superintendent of Rockhampton Hospital, Dr James Charles Ross, said they he didn't see any symptoms that led him to believe McQuade had been poisoned.

== Discovery of body ==
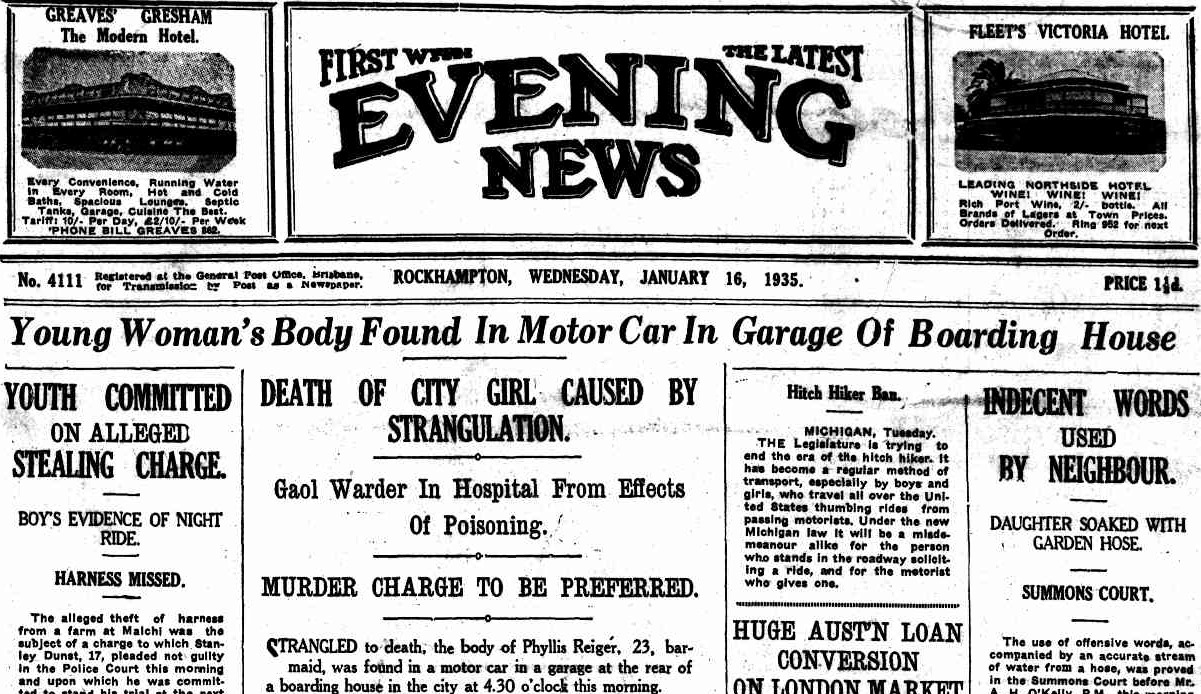
"Death of city girl caused by strangulation": the headline of 16 January 1935 edition of The Evening News

Reiger's body was found in the back of McQuade's car in the garage of Sarah Bean's boarding house at 105 Campbell Street at around 4:30am on 16 January 1935.

During McQuade's murder trial, government medical officer Dr Daniel Patrick O'Brien told the court that when he had examined Reiger's body, it was still warm due to it being a hot night but rigor mortis was beginning to set in. He said he had observed fingernail marks underneath her chin on either side of the throat and found her lungs to be congested with blood. He also told the court that she had been six weeks pregnant at the time of her death. He said he had estimated her death to have occurred approximately three hours earlier, sometime after midnight on 16 March 1935 and he had issued a death certificate listing choking as the cause.

Despite O'Brien finding Reiger to have been pregnant, fellow doctor Norman Talbot told the court that he had seen Reiger the previous evening but said in his opinion she was not pregnant. When challenged about the inconsistency regarding the pregnancy, O'Brien said Talbot would have only been able to examine her externally and therefore would not have detected an early pregnancy.

Reiger was buried at the North Rockhampton Cemetery on the same day she was found murdered, during a funeral which took place at 5pm. Coincidentally, Reiger's 45-year-old cousin Philipina Shea (the daughter of Peter Reiger's sister Elizabeth Jones) was buried at the same cemetery the day before. This was discussed by Peter Reiger in a newspaper interview after McQuade had been found guilty.

== Initial charges ==
Senior Sergeant Julius Henry Albeitz stated that after seeing Reiger's body, he went to the hospital to interview McQuade. When told a warrant had been issued for a charge of wilful murder, McQuade simply said: "I was expecting that."

McQuade remained in hospital for several days under police guard.

Upon his discharge from hospital, McQuade was charged and remanded in custody until his appearance in the Rockhampton Police Court on 30 January 1935, where he used crutches after reportedly suffering an attack of paralysis in the right leg while in hospital.

McQuade was remanded in custody until another appearance in the police court on 7 February 1935, McQuade was again remanded in custody.

At the conclusion of his police court hearing on 15 February 1935, McQuade pleaded not guilty and was committed to stand trial for the wilful murder of Phyllis Muriel Frances Reiger. After being told that she could not be compelled to give evidence, May McQuade said she wouldn't be prepared to give evidence in the case against her husband.

== Murder trial ==
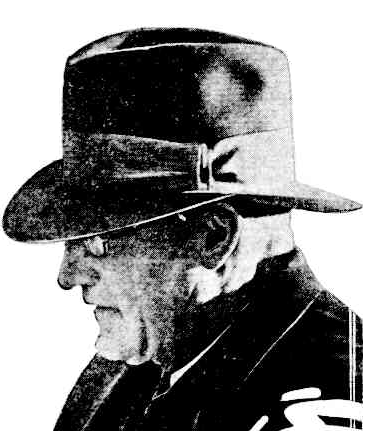
Jack McQuade, 1935

McQuade's two-day trial commenced at the Rockhampton Supreme Court on 15 May 1935 with judge Brennan presiding over the trial.

The prosecution presented its case during the first day of the trial, while the defence presented its case the following day.

Sixteen people were examined during the first day of the trial. This included various police officers, medical examiners and the boarding house keeper.

A witness called by the defence during the second day of the trial was McQuade's colleague, prison warder Alexander Hargreaves, who claimed to have spoken to Reiger at the Excelsior Hotel the previous November. Hargreaves told the court that Reiger had told him that she wasn't on speaking terms with McQuade as they had had "a bit of a tiff" but telling him "I will poison him first before I see him marry anyone else".

=== Jury's visit to 'the pictures' ===
In a somewhat unusual occurrence, when Justice Brennan ordered that the jury be locked up for the night during the two-day trial, one juror immediately asked whether that meant they could still go to the pictures that night.

Brennan replied that they could not see a movie, telling the jurors that they had all their lives ahead of them to go to the pictures and that surely they could spare just one night.

However, Brennan relented and permitted the jury members to attend a screening at a local picture theatre, on the condition that they were accompanied by the bailiff and police officers.

== Verdict ==
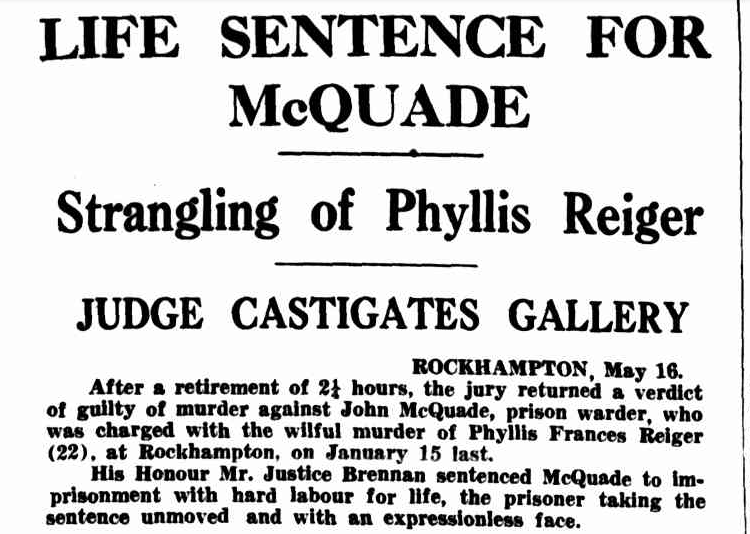
A report about the murder verdict in The Courier-Mail

At approximately 10:30pm on 16 May 1935, the twelve-man jury delivered its verdict in front of a crowded court precinct, with about 500 onlookers.

After more than two hours of deliberations, the jury returned their verdict, finding McQuade guilty of Reiger's murder.

Brennan sentenced McQuade to life imprisonment with hard labour.

=== Criticism of the public gallery ===
In what was to become a habit of Judge Brennan, while addressing the jury, he severely admonished those who sat in the public gallery for exhibiting "great delight" in hearing sexual elements of the case, describing the girls in the public gallery as harlots.

In his admonishment of the public gallery, Brennan stated:

You have seen these galleries crowded during the last two days. You have seen young females exhibiting great delight in anything sexual and have heard them laughing immoderately. These people are only here for the sordid side of the case. It is to be regretted that young boys and girls are permitted to go into court in this manner and listen to sexual matters. These young girls, I venture to say, if they are not already amateur harlots, will be professional harlots at an early date. There are women who come to court to listen from an educational point of view. I admire those women. But these young slips come here and giggle in the gallery. I think it is a disgrace to the community. No wonder the Church has already commented on the immorality of the community when even our courts are subjected to creatures of this kind. They do not think of turning their hand towards work, but prefer to come and listen to sexual matters.

Brennan would later infamously ban anyone from sitting in the public gallery during the 1947 Flora Prior murder trial in Rockhampton - a decision that attracted national press coverage.

=== Peter Reiger's newspaper interview ===
After McQuade's trial, Reiger's father Peter agreed to a newspaper interview with the Truth newspaper where he said that his daughter had planned a career in nursing and was preparing to leave for Mackay with references to show prospective employers. Talking about McQuade, Peter Reiger said that he seemed to be "a nice enough chap at times" who would often visit on Sunday evenings when he and Phyllis would have a "sing-song". However, he said that McQuade "was a jealous sort of man" who would threaten former prisoners from the gaol where he worked if they went into the Excelsior Hotel and talked to Phyllis. Peter Reiger claimed McQuade had said: "Fancy those fellows talking to Phyllis. Just wait till they get back to prison and I'll put them in their place." Peter Reiger also expressed sympathy for May McQuade and described her as an "innocent victim" who he couldn't help feeling sorry for.

=== Appeals ===
McQuade attempted to apply for leave to appeal against his conviction and sentence, but the Court of Criminal Appeal refused the application on 3 July 1935.

The following year, McQuade again attempted to apply for leave to appeal but it again was refused by the Court of Criminal Appeal on 2 March 1936.

== McQuade's prison time and later life ==
McQuade served his sentence at Stewart's Creek Gaol in Townsville and on the Numinbah Prison Farm.

His ability to serve out his sentence at Numinbah was met with opposition from sections of the press, namely Brisbane's Truth newspaper which published articles questioning why a convicted murderer with a life sentence could be allowed to attend a prison farm.

Upon McQuade's release from prison in the 1950s, he and his wife lived at Stones Corner. He found employment as a grass cutter while his wife worked as a shop assistant.

John Thomas McQuade died at the age of 71 on 10 January 1964. His wife May Ballinger died at the age of 67 on 17 July 1968.

They were both cremated at the Mt Thompson Memorial Gardens in Holland Park, where a commemorative plaque has been erected on a columbarium.

== Reiger's legacy ==
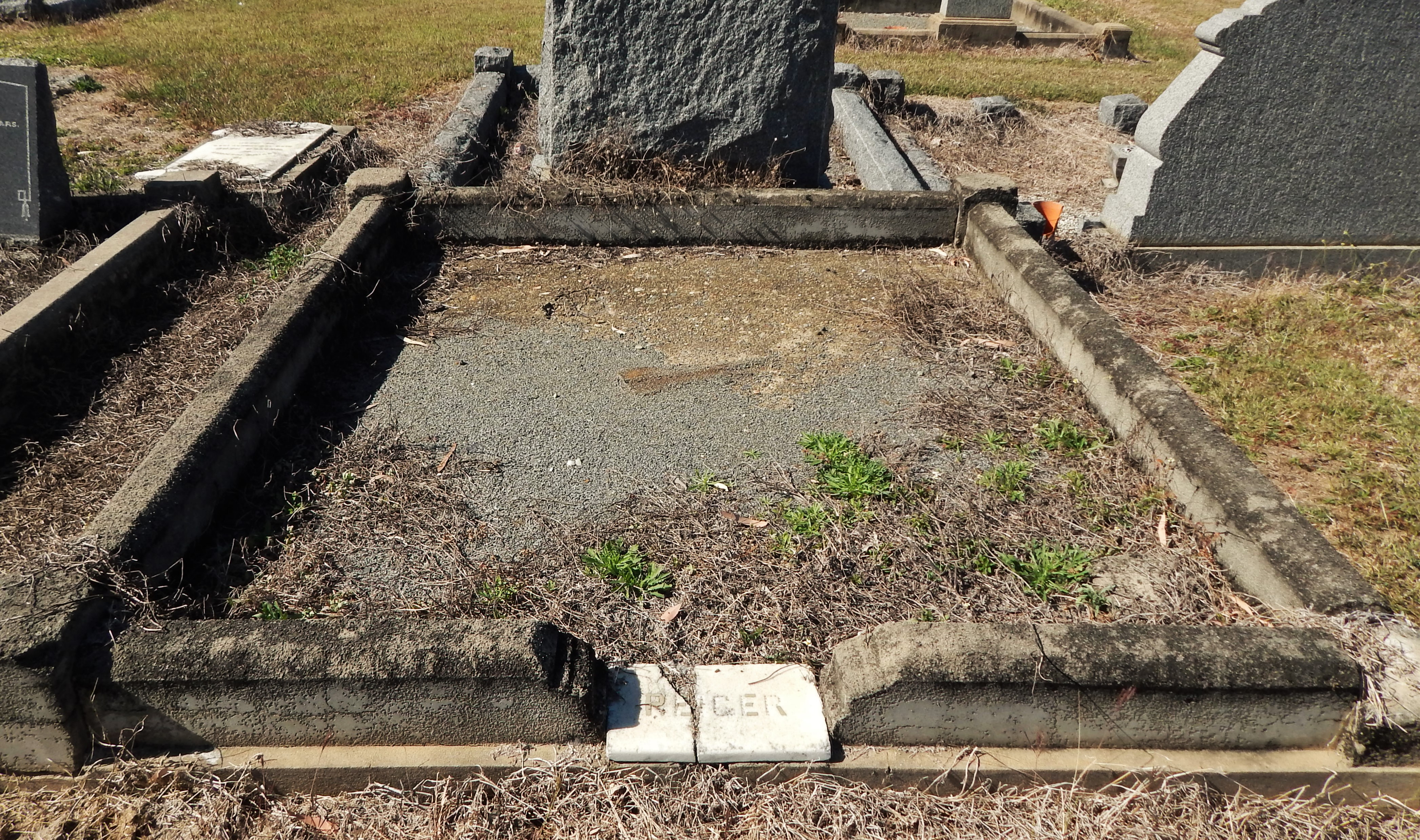
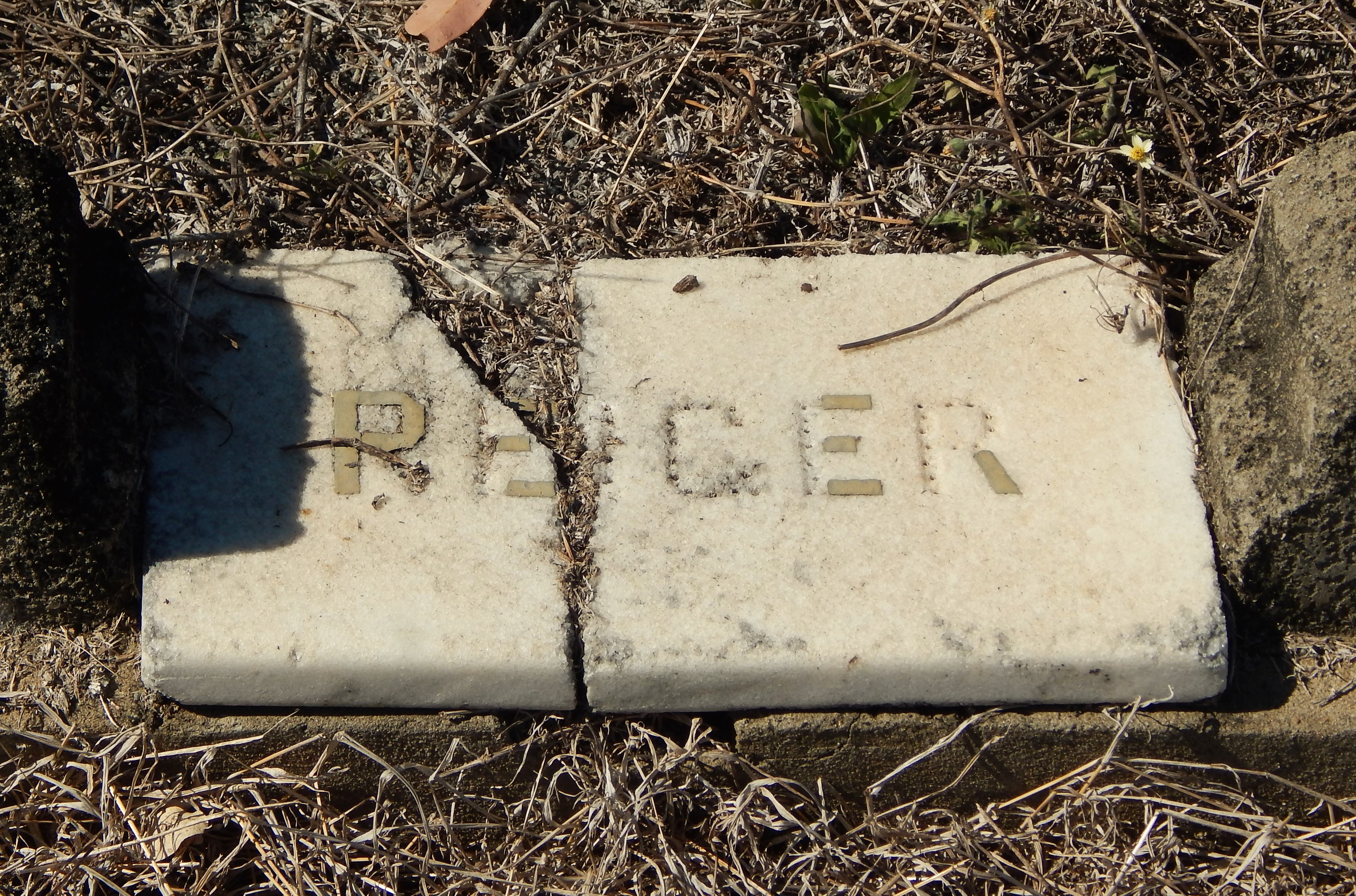
The grave of Phyllis Reiger and her father Peter Reiger in the North Rockhampton Cemetery, 2022

Phyllis Reiger was buried at the North Rockhampton Cemetery.

When Peter Reiger died at the age of 66 on 29 October 1946, he was buried beside his daughter in the same plot the following day.

== See also ==
- Murder of Fanny Hardwick
- Murder of Emily Salsbury
- Manslaughter of Flora Prior
