= North Rockhampton Cemetery =

Cemetery in Queensland, Australia

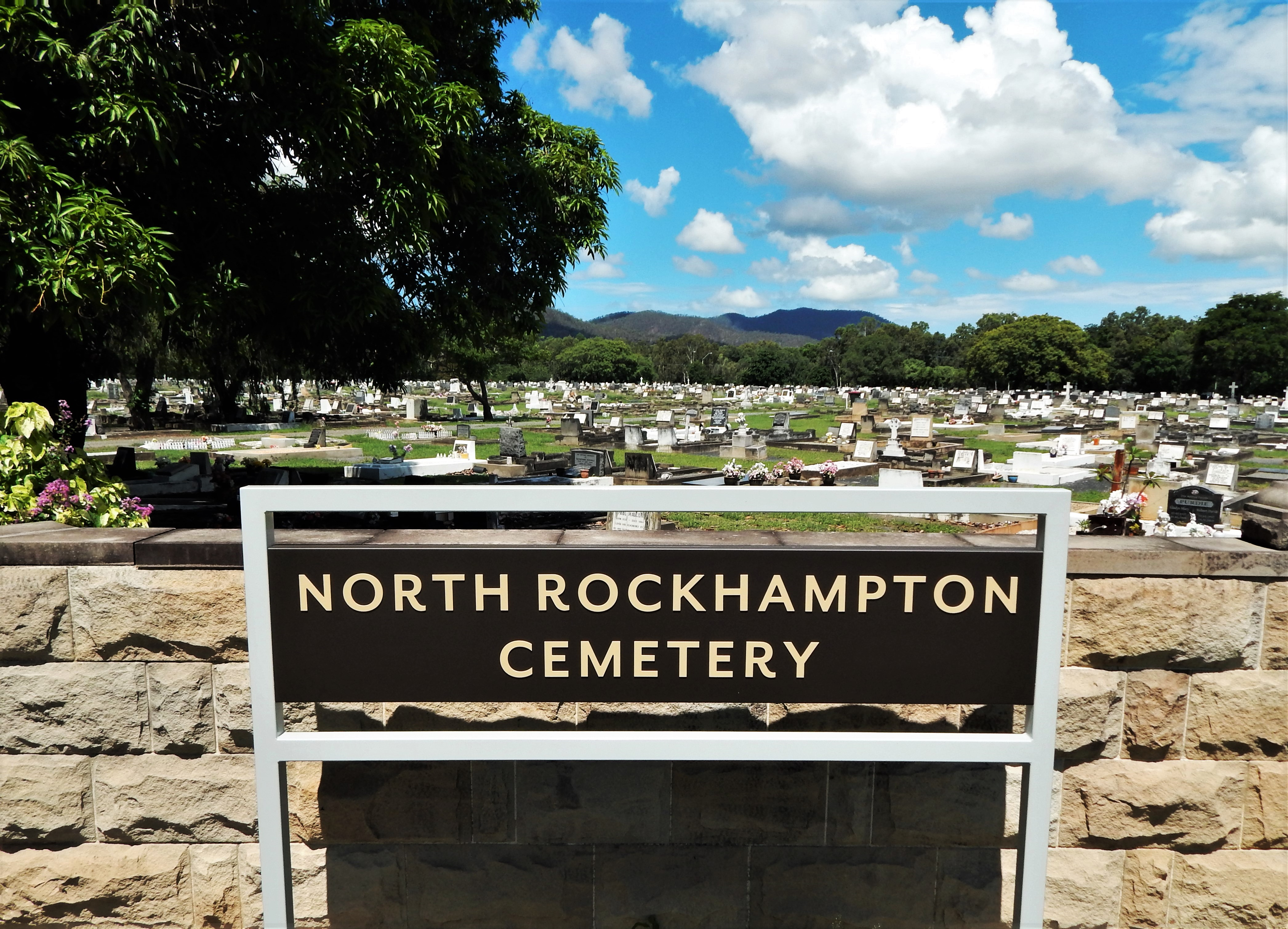
- North Rockhampton Cemetery
- Interactive map of North Rockhampton Cemetery

Details
- Established: 1879
- Location: cnr Yaamba Road and Moores Creek Road, Norman Gardens, Rockhampton, Queensland, Australia
- Country: Australia
- Coordinates: 23.3491°S 150.5239°E
- Type: monumental
- Style: denominational divisions
- Owned by: Rockhampton Regional Council
- Size: Approximately 11 hectares
- No. of graves: 25,100+
- Website: North Rockhampton Cemetery
- Find a Grave: North Rockhampton Cemetery

The North Rockhampton Cemetery is a cemetery in Rockhampton, Queensland, Australia, which was established in 1879.

It is situated approximately 11 hectares of land beside the Bruce Highway at the junction of Yaamba Road and Moores Creek Road in Norman Gardens.

It currently contains over 25,100 graves.

== History ==
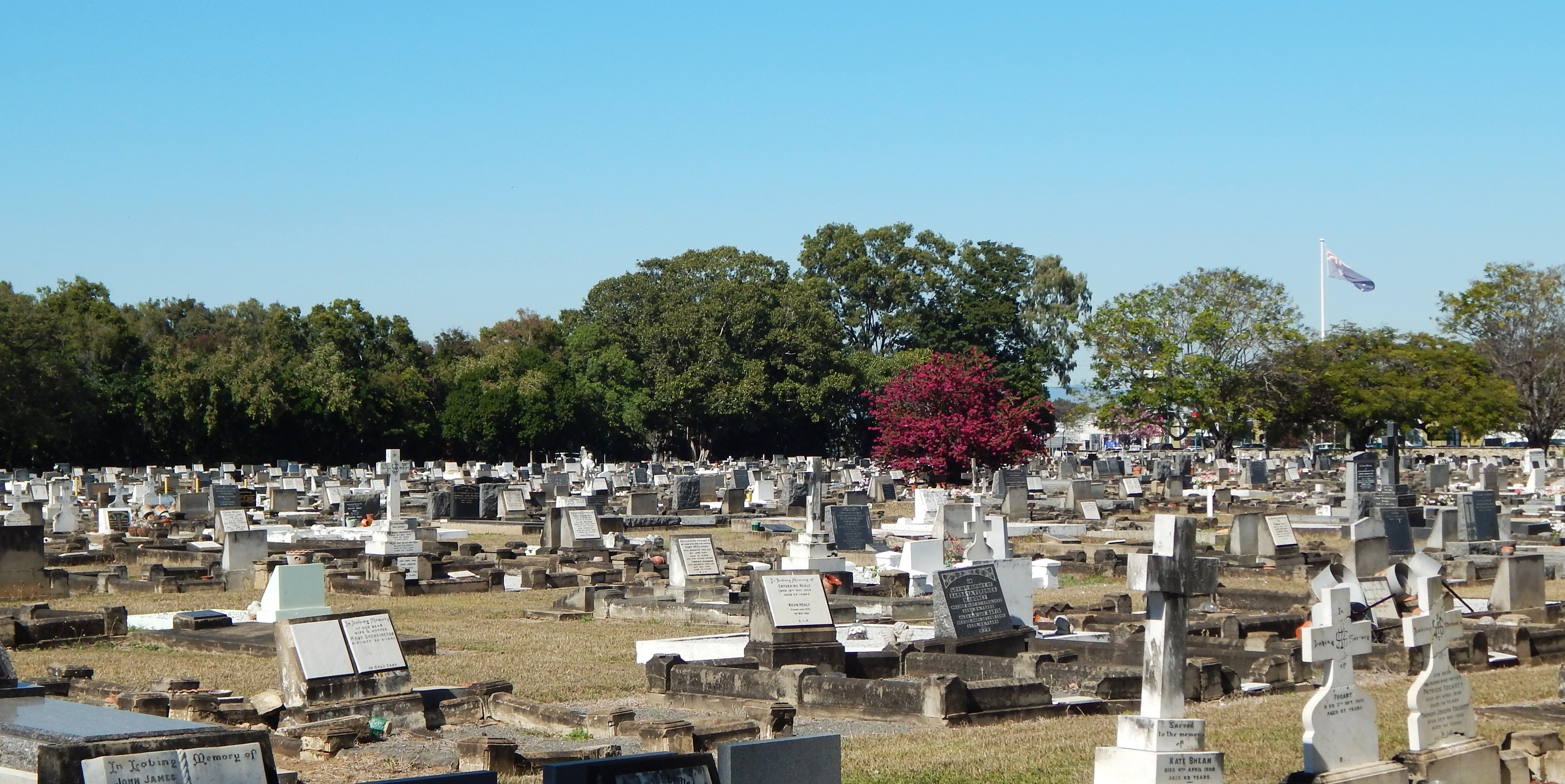
North Rockhampton Cemetery, 2022

North Rockhampton Cemetery was established in 1879. According to council records, the first burial at the cemetery was that of a young girl called Elizabeth Rogers who was buried on 1 March 1879.

The cemetery was officially consecrated on 15 September 1879 by Bishop Mathew Hale. This occurred eleven days after the cemetery's second burial when a woman named Annie Cusack was buried on 4 September 1879.

In 1932, the cemetery was beautified with the trustees planting suitable shrubs and trees throughout the grounds. Garden seats and new toilet facilities were also installed. A waiting room and fully furnished office were also added which were officially opened by Owen Daniel.

In 1946, a 12-year-old boy received minor injuries when a tombstone fell on him at the cemetery. Four men were required to lift the heavy monument so the boy could be freed. In 1949, a 16-year-old boy was injured in a similar incident when a tombstone fell on him causing a probable fracture of the right leg, severe lacerations and bruising.

In 2005, a risk assessment identified the potential for gravesides to collapse due to the cemetery's close proximity to Moores Creek. The risk of mourners falling into open graves during funerals prompted Rockhampton City Council to commence using a hydraulic ram shoring system to reinforce the ends of graves, significantly reducing the risk of graveside accidents during funeral services.

In 2010, there were complaints from local residents about the unkempt condition of the North Rockhampton Cemetery. One woman stated in the local media that she would refuse to bury her father in the cemetery due to what she described as its "disgusting" condition, specifically the amount of long grass and weeds which were growing throughout the grounds. A spokesperson from Rockhampton Regional Council claimed the mowing hadn't recommenced at the cemetery due to the ground being too wet following recent heavy rain which meant there was an increased risk of damage to the graves.

During the 2016 clown sightings, police responded to an incident at the cemetery after a man dressed as a clown allegedly vandalised a baby's grave. Police apprehended a 36-year-old West Rockhampton man who was dressed as a clown and charged him with being a public nuisance.

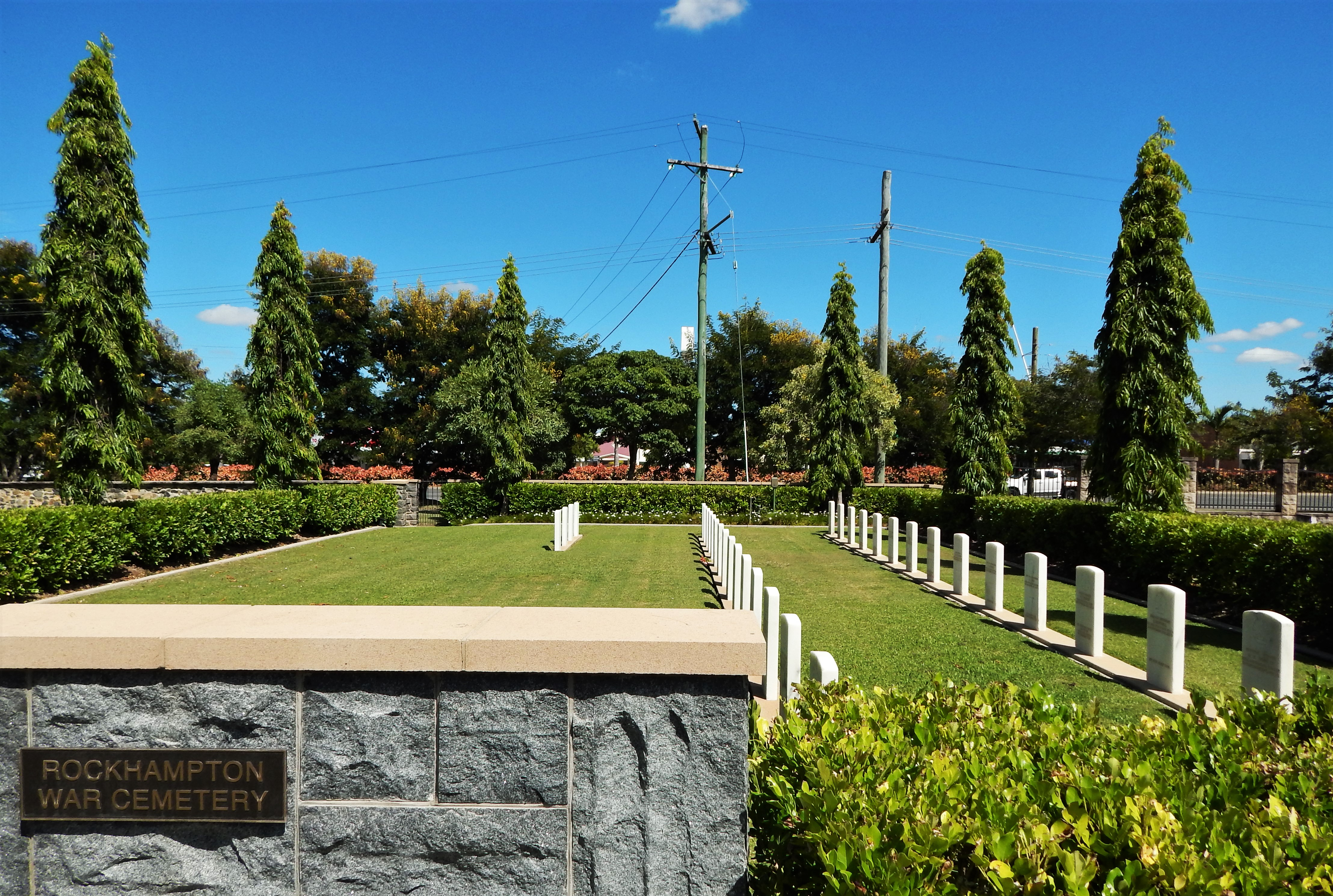
Rockhampton War Cemetery, situated in the grounds of the North Rockhampton Cemetery, 2022

Despite not officially being closed, from the 1990s until 2015 the cemetery was only open to interments in reserved or family plots. However, with local cemeteries nearing capacity due to a growing population, Rockhampton Regional Council used ground penetrating radar to identify an additional 279 plots. This allowed burials to recommence at the cemetery for several more years. In 2020, it was reported North Rockhampton Cemetery's imminent closure would occur in 2022.

As of 2018, there had been over 25,100 burials in the North Rockhampton Cemetery. This includes the Rockhampton War Cemetery which is located within the North Rockhampton Cemetery and maintained by the Commonwealth War Graves Commission.

Despite the first burials taking place less than twenty years after the smaller South Rockhampton Cemetery, North Rockhampton Cemetery is not yet heritage listed.

== Location ==
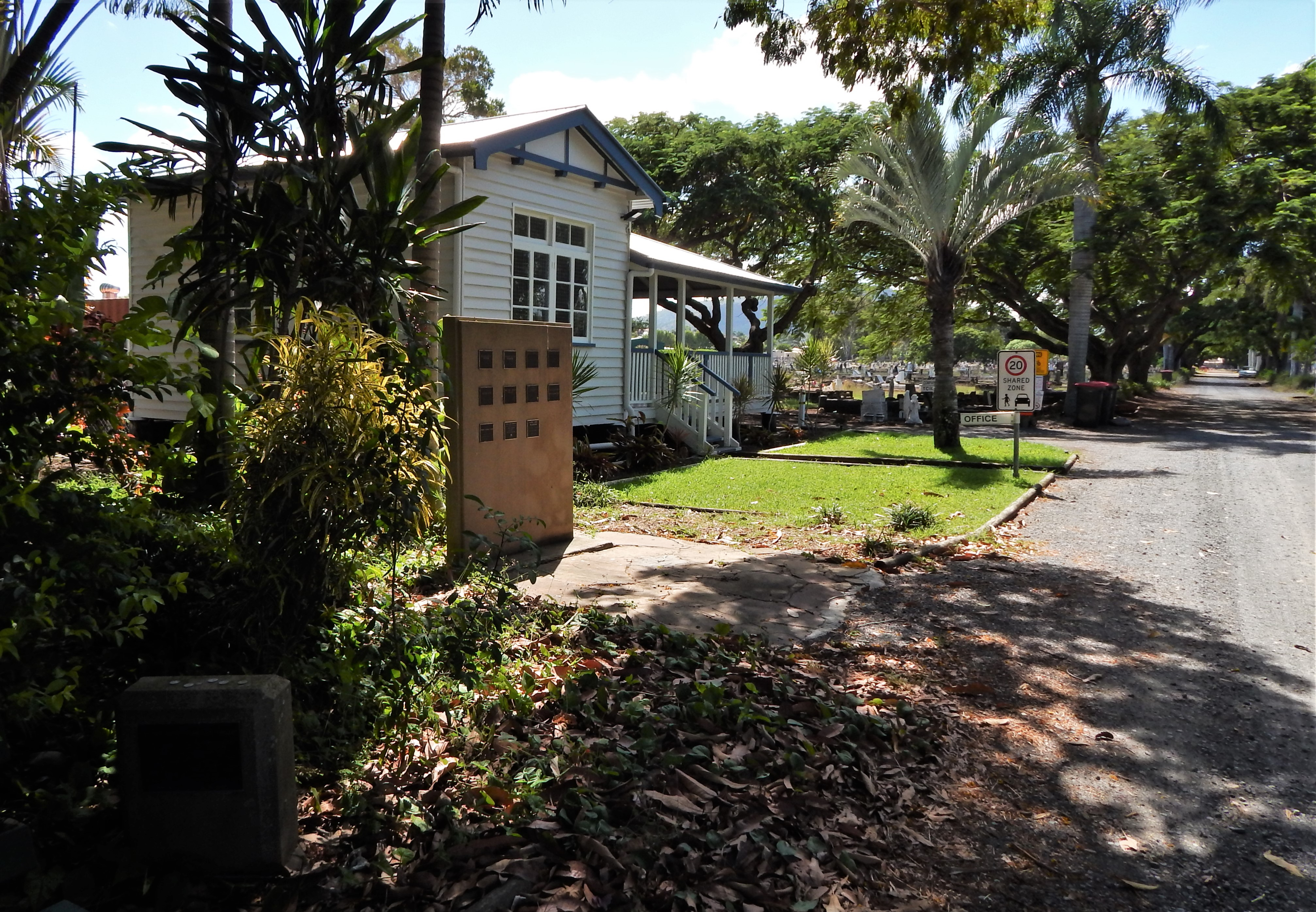
Entrance to North Rockhampton Cemetery, 2022

Originally situated on what was then the outskirts of North Rockhampton, the city's rapid commercial development of the late 20th century saw the cemetery quickly surrounded by urban infrastructure and residential housing. This included the Marian College for Girls which opened next to the cemetery in 1964 (becoming Emmaus College in 1983).

A major shopping centre called Rockhampton Shopping Fair was built diagonally opposite the cemetery in 1983 which officially opened in 1985. The centre later re-branded to Stockland Rockhampton in 2004 and underwent a major expansion in 2009 when it expanded over Moores Creek onto the old K Mart Plaza site, which opened in 1979.

Many other retail outlets, petrol stations and accommodation providers are located nearby, with applications lodged for further commercial development.

North Rockhampton Cemetery is situated at one of Rockhampton's busiest intersections as the Bruce Highway carries large volumes of traffic past the cemetery. As such, there have been numerous traffic incidents near the cemetery.

A pedestrian overpass was installed in front of the cemetery in 2010 to provide a safe passage for pedestrians to cross the highway, particularly Emmaus College students.

When the Rockhampton Ring Road is complete, the Bruce Highway will no longer go through Rockhampton meaning the volume of traffic travelling past the cemetery will likely decrease.

== Notable burials ==
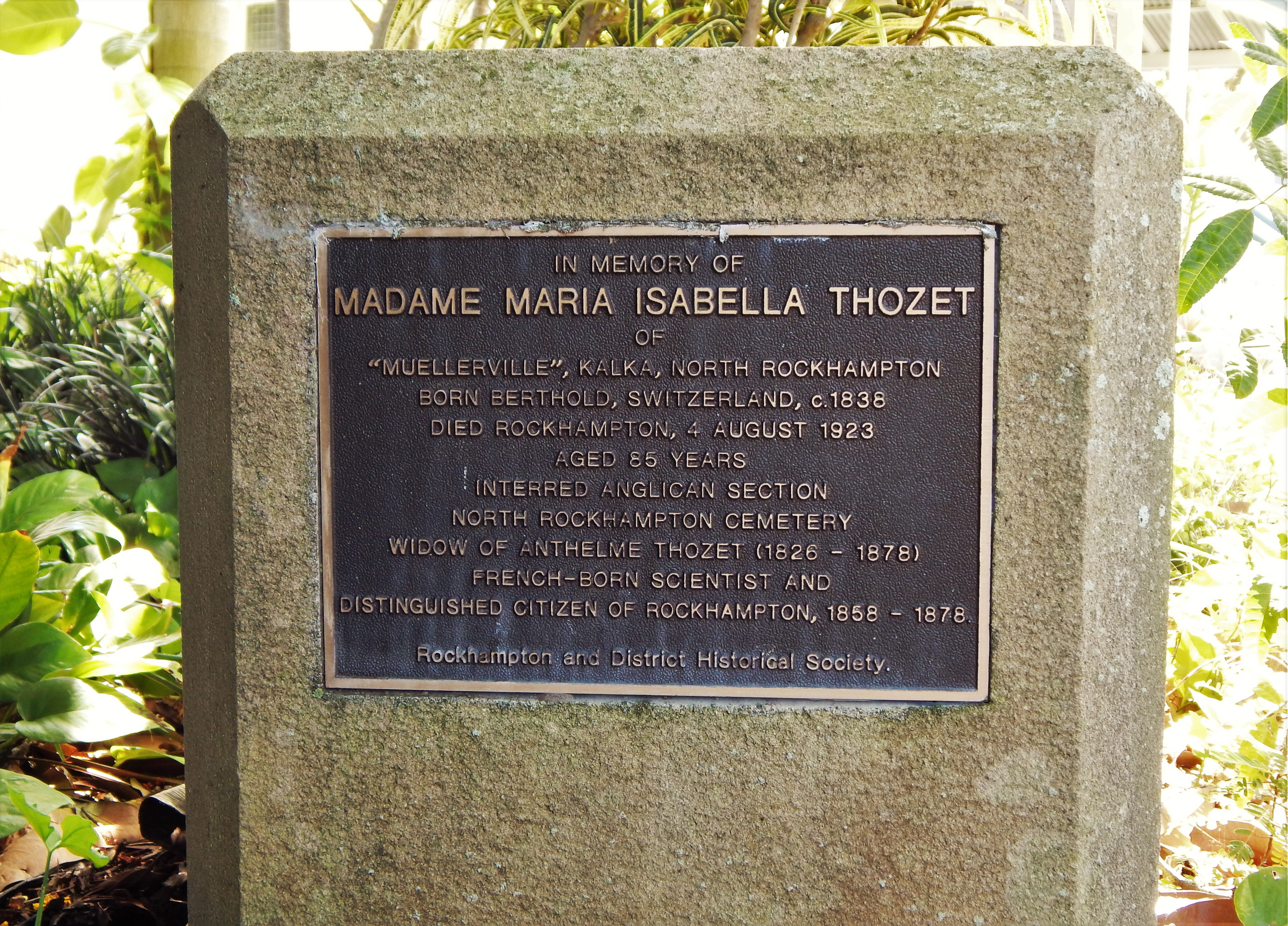
Plaque near the entrance to the North Rockhampton Cemetery, commemorating the burial of Maria Thozet, 2022

Maria Thozet: In 1923, Maria Thozet, the wife of famed botanist Anthelme Thozet, was buried in the cemetery against her wishes. This was despite her husband, son and daughter-in-law all having been buried in a family plot on "Muellerville", the Thozet family property in Koongal. The graves, which were rediscovered in 2010, were originally marked by an obelisk of Carrara marble.

However, after Maria Thozet's death, "Muellerville" was sold. The obelisk subsequently was sold by the new owners, removed, repurposed and installed on a separate unrelated plot at the North Rockhampton Cemetery while Maria Thozet lay in an unmarked grave. Aside from information which indicates Maria Thozet is buried in the Anglican section of the cemetery, the precise location of her grave is unknown. Therefore, the Rockhampton & District Historical Society installed a commemorative plaque in her memory which was erected near the entrance to the cemetery.

1943 air disasters: The bodies of numerous Australian armed services personnel were buried in the Rockhampton War Cemetery at the North Rockhampton Cemetery following two major wartime air disasters which occurred in the Central Queensland region four weeks apart in 1943, during World War II. The Rewan air crash on 16 November 1943 and the Canal Creek air crash on 19 December 1943 killed a total of 50 people, including numerous United States military personnel.

Queenie Hart: In August 2022, the remains of Queenie Hart, a 28-year-old Aboriginal woman murdered in 1975, were exhumed from the unmarked grave at the North Rockhampton Cemetery where she originally buried and returned to Cherbourg. Her killer was never brought to justice with the only suspect dying in 2019. Family and friends of the victim believe the case was never given a high priority due to racial prejudices held by the police and media. The exhumation took place after the victim's family raised more than $20,000 through a crowdfunding platform. Before the exhumation, the traditional owners of the land the North Rockhampton Cemetery sits on, the Darumbal people, held a corroboree and smoking ceremony. The woman's remains were then transported to Cherbourg where a celebration of the woman's life was held.

Danny Malone: When internationally renowned Irish tenor Danny Malone unexpectedly died on a train between Marmor and Raglan while en route to Gladstone during a 1951 tour, his body was brought back to Rockhampton where he was buried at the North Rockhampton Cemetery.

Notable burials at the North Rockhampton Cemetery include:

- William Beak (cattle breeder and Livingstone Shire chairman)
- George Gray (politician)
- Walter Ingram (politician)
- Vince Jones (politician)
- Henry Kellow (author, literary critic and teacher)
- Thomas Joseph Lee (Rockhampton mayor)
- John Linnett (politician)
- Danny Malone (Irish tenor)
- Flora Prior (murder victim)
- Phyllis Reiger (murder victim)
- Rewan air crash victims
- Canal Creek air crash victims
