= Danny Malone =

Irish tenor

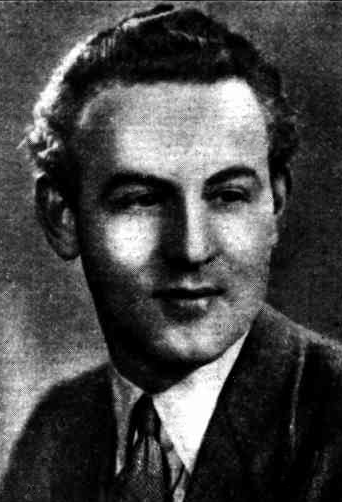
- Danny Malone
- Born: John York Millar Johnston; 15 July 1909; Ballyclare, County Antrim, Ireland
- Died: 21 August 1951 (aged 42); On passenger train between Marmor and Raglan, Queensland, Australia
- Burial place: North Rockhampton Cemetery, Norman Gardens, Queensland, Australia; 23.3472°S 150.5265°E
- Occupation: performer
- Years active: 1933–1951
- Known for: Performing on radio, releasing gramophone records, appearing in musical films, singing in vaudeville shows
- Notable work: Rose of Tralee, Stepping Toes, Bonnie Prince Charlie
- Spouses: Hazel Malone (m. 1934; div. 1937) Jean Huxley (m. 1938)
- Children: 1

John York Millar Johnston (15 July 1909 – 21 August 1951), known professionally as Danny Malone, was an Irish tenor.

Malone had considerable success in the 1930s after a successful audition with the BBC, selling thousands of gramophone records while also touring extensively throughout the United Kingdom, the United States and Australia.

Malone also appeared in a number of films including Rose of Tralee, Stepping Toes and Bonnie Prince Charlie.

== Early life ==
Malone was born to William Henry and Isabella Johnston in Ballyclare, near Belfast, County Antrim on 15 July 1909. He was one of eight children and his family struggled in poverty. Growing up, he was forced to forgo some of his education to work selling newspapers for three years to support his family.

He then obtained work at the shipyards at Belfast was left his job there due to poor working conditions, after which he roamed Ireland in search of jobs. Malone eventually got a job as a deck boy on a ship which sailed to Australia, earning a shilling a month. He disembarked in Sydney and went tramping throughout the eastern states of Australia. When he ran out of money, Malone commenced busking by singing in remote Australian towns to earn just enough for the ensuing days.

While humping his swag throughout Australia, Malone slept under open skies, and learnt how to jump trains and find water. He worked various jobs including as a boundary rider, a roustabout, rabbiter and cane cutter.

After becoming homesick, he secured work on a homeward bound Swedish steamer and returned home.

== Career ==
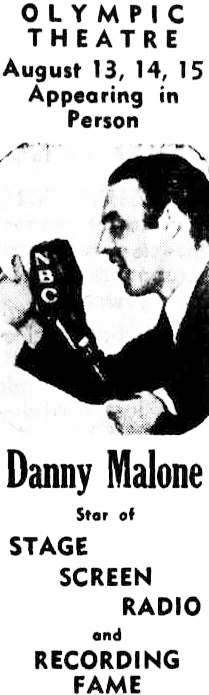
Daily Mercury newspaper advertisement for what became Malone's final performances, 1951

After briefly reuniting with his parents, Malone left for London in November 1932, confident that his luck would turn in his favour. But again, Malone struggled to find work or accommodation. Starving, he slept rough and took to singing outside London pubs in an attempt to earn money.

Desperate, Malone decided to visit the London office of Australian songwriter and music publisher Basil Charles-Dean and ask for a job. When asked what he could do, Malone offered up his varied experience of jobs. Charles-Dean asked if he could sing, and Malone modestly said he could sing a little.

As Charles-Dean played extracts from familiar Irish songs on a piano, Malone sang along. Impressed with Malone's exceptional voice, Charles-Dean immediately contacted Martin Webster from the BBC and an audition was quickly organised.

Although Malone fainted from hunger afterwards, the audition was a success with his performance saw him booked to appear the following day on a program which also featured Gertrude Lawrence and Douglas Fairbanks Jr.

Malone's debut was a success and his profile quickly rose earning him the nickname "Fame in a Night Tenor" with his voice drawing comparisons to fellow Irish tenor John McCormack. Malone completed approximately 500 broadcasts with the BBC Empire Service including a special St Patrick's Day performance.

Recording records for such labels as His Master's Voice, Decca and Columbia, Malone quickly built up a catalogue of his interpretation of songs such as "Danny Boy", "When Irish Eyes Are Smiling", "Somewhere a Voice is Calling", "Silver Threads Among the Gold", "Mother Machree" and "Believe Me, If All Those Endearing Young Charms".

Charles-Dean also wrote a song specifically for Malone entitled "Though There's Millions Around (I'm Alone)".

Malone embarked on extensive tours of England, Ireland, Scotland, New Zealand, Australia and the United States. He performed on the NBC Radio Network for four and a half months in 1937 prior to his American tour.

After a successful season at the London Palladium, Malone returned to Australia in 1939 where he appeared at the Prince Edward Theatre in Sydney in association with the ABC's New Note Octette under the leadership of Albert Fisher.

Despite appearing in the 1948 movie Bonnie Prince Charlie which starred David Niven, Malone's career appeared to slow during the 1940s, not helped by being conscripted in 1942 to work as a bevin boy in the underground coal mines of Doncaster for two years during World War II.

In an interview in 1951, Malone revealed he had battled alcoholism and again struggled while living rough in Brisbane with no job and no money. Malone said he had sought assistance from The Salvation Army after he followed their brass band back to their temple after watching them play. Malone said he immediately converted to The Salvation Army which he claimed was the best thing he had ever done proclaiming "With the help of my Army friends, I won out. I have a good job."

In the late 1940s, Malone became involved with the Theatre Royal in Brisbane appearing in numerous stage productions including a musical comedy called "Stars and Stripes" and a burlesque ballet called "Swan Song". His work with the Theatre Royal led to Malone performing in regional Queensland cities which were particularly receptive of his powerful voice. Following a performance at the Rockhampton School of Arts on 21 June 1951, the city's local newspaper The Morning Bulletin reported: "It is seldom that a singer of Irish-American tenor, Danny Malone, is heard in Rockhampton. His singing of Irish songs, his intonation and beautiful delivery and technique resulted in him being recalled again and again."

In July 1951, Malone embarked on a vaudeville tour of regional Queensland where he performed as the headline act in places such as Townsville, Charters Towers, Cloncurry, Bowen and Mackay. Malone's appearance in Mackay on 15 August 1951 at the end of a three-show run at the Olympic Theatre would be his last performance.

== Personal life and death ==
In 1934, Malone married Hazel Emily Knight from Chiswick in London. After having a son together, Knight divorced Malone in 1943 on the grounds he committed adultery when they toured Australia together in 1937.

Malone married his second wife, Blanche Huxley (known as Jean) from the Queensland gold mining town of Charters Towers in Southend-on-Sea in 1938.

At the time of his death, Malone had been living in Queensland for about three years, with the address listed on his death certificate as Abuklea Street, Newmarket.

=== Death ===
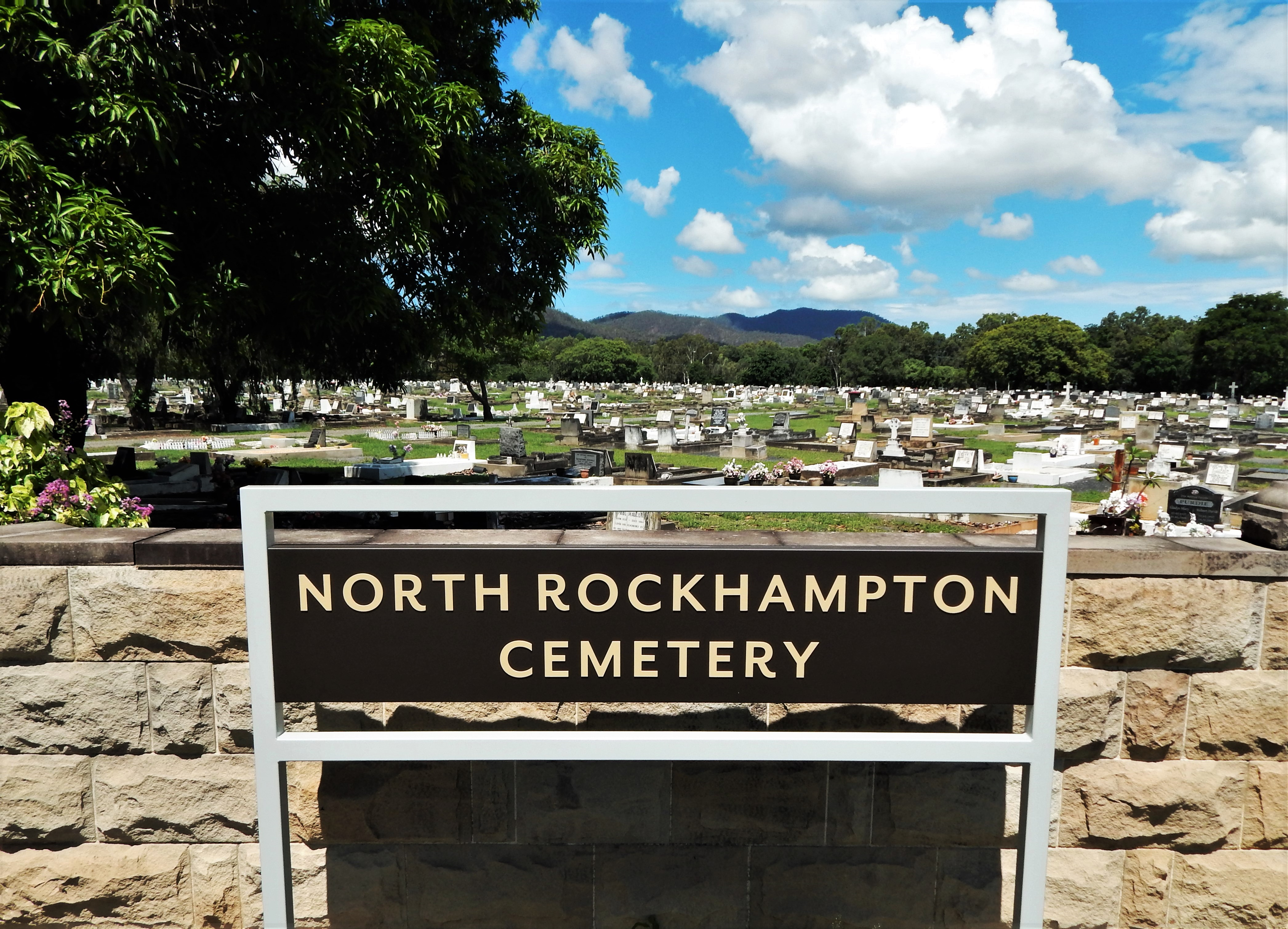
North Rockhampton Cemetery where Malone's burial took place in 1951

Travelling on a train to Gladstone where he was scheduled to perform, Malone suddenly collapsed and died between Marmor and Raglan on 21 August 1951. Malone's body was removed at Raglan and transported back to Rockhampton for a post-mortem examination which was conducted by Norman Talbot. The cause of death was determined to be "cardiac arrest due to hypertension with hypertrophy of heart due to arteriosclerosis of kidneys with pyelitis".

The Salvation Army conducted a late afternoon funeral service on 23 August 1951 at the North Rockhampton Cemetery where Malone was buried.

A testimonial show was held at the Tivoli Theatre in Rockhampton on 26 August 1951 to not only honour Malone but to also uphold the theatrical principle of "the show must go on."
