= List of accidents and incidents involving the DC-3 in 1943 =

This is a List of accidents and incidents involving Douglas DC-3 ^{A} variants that have taken place in the year 1943, including aircraft based on the DC-3 airframe such as the Douglas C-47 Skytrain and Lisunov Li-2. Military accidents are included; and hijackings and incidents of terrorism are covered, although acts of war are outside the scope of this list.

January 11
A United Airlines DC-3A-197 (registration NC16090, named Mainliner Medford) crashed at Oakland Municipal Airport while attempting to land; both pilots survived, but the aircraft was written off. The aircraft was operating under contract to the USAAF.
January 21
US Navy R4D-1 05051 struck the slope of Fremont Peak near Flagstaff, Arizona, killing six.
January 22
Pan American-Grace Airways (Panagra) Flight 9 (a Douglas DC-3A-399, registration NC33645) struck a mountain peak at 13,000 feet near Chaparra, Peru due to pilot error, killing 14 of 15 on board (only a passenger survived).
January 23
An Aeroflot Lisunov PS-84 (registration CCCP-L3443) crashed at the "16th Party Congress" sovkhoz (state farm) near Myakinino while attempting to find a place to land after attempting to divert to Khimki, killing five of 10 on board. The aircraft was operating a Khvoinaya-Moscow cargo service.
January 31
RAF Douglas C-53 Skytrooper MA929 disappeared with six on board while on a Dinjan-Fort Hertz flight; the wreckage has not been located.
February 17
A Soviet Air Force Lisunov Li-2 crashed at Pisarevka village, Russia, killing all six on board.
March 2
A Soviet Air Force Lisunov Li-2 crashed near Sol-Iletsk in bad weather and poor visibility; all on board survived the crash and attempted to reach Sol-Iletsk, but nine died of hypothermia within hours during the trek.
March 5
An Aeroflot PS-84 (CCCP-L3913) crashed near Berdigestyakh after both engines lost power in heavy snow, killing three of 11 on board.
March 8
A Soviet Air Force Lisunov Li-2 crashed near Bataisk Airfield, Rostov region, Russia, killing all five on board.
March 11
A China National Aviation Corporation Douglas C-53-DO Skytrooper (registration 53) crashed near Luishui, China after entering a downdraft, killing all three on board.
March 13
A China National Aviation Corporation Douglas C-53 Skytrooper (registration 49) disappeared over the Himalayas with three on board while on a Kunming-Dinjan cargo flight.
March 27
RAAF Douglas C-47-DL A65-2 crashed into a wooded area shortly after takeoff from Archerfield RAAF Station, killing all 23 on board.
March 27
An Aeroflot PS-84 (registration CCCP-L3440) crashed while attempting to land at Khodynka Aerodrome after returning to the airport following an engine problem (probably caused by low-octane fuel), killing two of 14 on board.
April 7
A China National Aviation Corporation Douglas C-53-DO Skytrooper (registration 58) clipped one mountain and came to rest on another at 13,750 feet 30 mi northeast of Minzong, India after the pilot made an evasive maneuver, killing one of three on board.
April 29
A Soviet Air Force Lisunov Li-2 crashed at Dmitrovskoye shosse, Moscow, Russia, killing all six on board.
May 11
An Aeroflot PS-84 (registration CCCP-L3931) crashed during a test flight near Molotov Airport following double engine failure caused by crew error, killing one of five on board.
May 20
An Aeroflot PS-84 (registration CCCP-L3909) struck a mountainside in poor weather near Sochi while on a supply flight for partisans in the Crimea, killing the six crew.
May 24
An Aeroflot DC-3-196 (registration URSS-B, M/N 2035), with 4 crew members and 16 passengers, stalled and crashed on takeoff from Zavodskoy Airfield in Saratov after lifting off too late. Co-pilot was killed. Two other crew members and one passenger sustained injuries. The aircraft was operating a Baku–Saratov-Moscow–passenger service.
June 1
BOAC Flight 777, a DC-3-194 (registration G-AGBB), is attacked by eight Luftwaffe Junkers Ju 88s of KG 40 and crashes into Bay of Biscay, killing all 17 on board. The aircraft was owned and operated by KLM.
June 3
Soviet Air Force PS-84 CCCP-L3932 struck tree tops and crashed near Zezevitovo after both engines failed due to a loss of fuel pressure, killing six. The aircraft was operating a Chkalovsky-Vologda-Belomorsk service.
June 4
A Soviet Air Force Lisunov Li-2 (registration CCCP-L344) stalled and crashed on takeoff from Molotov (now Perm) after the pilot attempted a takeoff from the wrong runway, killing three of 10 on board; the left wing struck a parked Li-2 (CCCP-L3962) and the aircraft collided with a wooden shed.
June 8
US Navy R4D-5 12406 crashed into St. Vincent's Bay shortly after takeoff, killing 24.
June 9
A Soviet Air Force C-47A crashed on climbout from Magadan Airport due to a maintenance error, killing six of eight on board.
June 9
A Hamiata DC-3-196A (registration URSS-N) crashed 20 km (12 mi) northeast of Yanchi, China, killing all 32 on board; wreckage was found six days later. While flying over the Chigi-Chinze pass, the aircraft encountered icing conditions followed by a downdraft. Control was lost and the aircraft struck the southern side of the pass. The aircraft was operating a Alma-Ata (now Almaty)–Tihwa (now Urumqi)–Hami passenger service.
June 14
A Soviet Air Force Lisunov Li-2 (registration CCCP-L4035) crashed 19 mi from Maksatikh, Tver region, Russia due to engine failure caused by fuel exhaustion; there were no casualties, but the aircraft was written off. The aircraft was operating a Moscow-Leningrad service.
June 20
A Pan Am C-49K (serial number 43-2009) crashed into Biscayne Bay, killing two. The aircraft was operating for the USAAF.
July 2
US Navy R4D-1 01990 struck Table Top Mountain near NAS Dutch Harbor, Alaska, killing 10.
July 10
USAAF C-47A 42-23786 was flying in a V-formation with five other aircraft during formation training when it collided with USAAF C-53 42-68785 19 mi west of Hemingford, Nebraska, killing all eight on board both aircraft.
July 17
USAAF C-47A 41-38730 was flying with five other aircraft during formation training when it collided with USAAF C-53 42-6464 10 mi north of Grenada Army Air Base, killing all 10 on board both aircraft.
July 28
American Airlines Flight 63 (a Douglas DC-3-178, registration NC16014, named Flagship Ohio) crashed near Trammel, Kentucky after a loss of control caused by downdrafts and turbulence in a thunderstorm, killing 20 of 22 on board.
August 2
USAAF Douglas C-47A 42-23957 crashed near Rock Falls, Iowa after a loss of control caused by turbulence and overloading, killing all five on board.
August 8
An Aeroflot PS-84 (registration CCCP-L3982) crashed shortly after takeoff from Balashov Airfield after an engine in the cargo compartment broke loose and broke through the floor, trapping the control cable for the horizontal stabilizer and causing a loss of control, killing the six crew.
August 11
A China National Aviation Corporation Douglas C-53 Skytrooper (registration 48) crashed in the Fort Hertz valley, killing all three on board; the aircraft may have been shot down.
August 21
An Aeroflot Li-2 (registration CCCP-L4034) went missing while on a flight from Oboyan to a site behind German lines near Mirgorod; the aircraft was last seen flying over the front line near Akhtryka, Sumy Region.
August 22
An Aeroflot PS-84 (registration CCCP-L3956) crashed near Rechitsa, Gomel Region due to engine failure while returning from a cargo flight for partisans, killing five of six on board.
August 28
A Soviet Air Force C-47 struck a mountain in the Zolotoi Khrebet mountain range while descending through clouds, killing the four crew.
An Aeroflot PS-84 (registration CCCP-L3959) crashed near Khvoinaya Airport due to spatial disorientation while flying in a storm, killing two.
September 5
USAAF Douglas C-53D Skytrooper 42-68841 broke apart in mid-air in severe winds at 6000 feet 10 mi south of Sedalia, Missouri, killing all 11 on board.
September 19
An Aeroflot PS-84 (registration CCCP-L4008) crashed near Yakhnovo Airfield due to double engine failure caused by crew error, killing all 17 on board.
September 20
USAAF Douglas C-53D Skytrooper 42-68739 stalled and crashed at Maxton Army Air Base after the pilot avoided a head-on collision with a C-47 that was towing a glider, killing all 25 on board the C-53; the C-47 did not crash.
September 20
An Aeroflot Li-2 (registration CCCP-L4029) crashed while on approach to Tashla after the crew deviated from the flight route, killing all five on board.
September 27
USAAF Douglas C-47-DL 41-18566 crashed 11 mi southwest of Lawson Army Air Base after the left propeller, engine and wing separated, killing all four on board.
October 15
American Airlines Flight 63 (a Douglas DC-3-178, named Flagship Missouri) crashed near Centerville, Tennessee due to wing and propeller icing, killing all 11 on board.
November 2
USAAF Douglas C-47A 42-24360 disappeared while on a Yunnanyi-Misamari flight with three on board; the wreckage was found on October 9, 1944.
November 16
USAAF Dakota C-47 crashed in central Queensland, Australia, killing all 19 military personnel.
November 19
Inbound from Houston, Eastern Air Lines Flight 12 (a Douglas DC-3-201E, NC19968) was attempting a second landing at New Orleans when it descended too low and the number one propeller struck the water, tearing off the propeller, cowling and parts of the number one engine; the aircraft was able to land safely at New Orleans with no casualties to the 15 on board.
November 21
USAAF Douglas C-47A 42-32929 crashed an eighth of a mile west of Tamaqua, Pennsylvania in low visibility conditions, killing 7 of the 9 occupants onboard.
December 18
An Aeroflot C-47A (registration CCCP-L825) crashed in a meadow near Ramenye while returning from an unsuccessful supply flight for partisans in eastern Latvia, killing all 14 on board.
December 19
USAAF Douglas C-47 Skytrain 43-30742 crashed north of Rockhampton, Queensland, Australia, when it is believed an engine fire followed by an explosion, caused a crash, killing the 4 crew and 27 other military personnel onboard.
December 21
An Aeroflot Li-2 (registration CCCP-L4032) stalled and crashed near Vnukovo Airport during a training flight due to double engine failure caused by a defect in a fuel tank, killing three of seven crew.
December 27
US Navy Douglas R4D-5 12432 disappeared over the Pacific while on a Nouméa-Espiritu Santo flight with 24 on board.

== See also ==
- List of accidents and incidents involving the DC-3 in the 1940s

== Notes ==
^Note A Military versions of the DC-3 were known as C-47 Skytrain, C-48, C-49, C-50, C-51, C-52, C-53 Skytrooper, C-68, C-84, C-117 Super Dakota and YC-129 by the United States Army Air Forces and as the R4D by the United States Navy. In Royal Air Force (and other British Commonwealth air forces') service, these aircraft were known as Dakotas.
