= Murder of Queenie Hart =

1975 murder of Aboriginal woman

Queenie Hart
- Born: c. 1947; Cherbourg, Queensland
- Died: Approximately 14 April 1975 (aged 27–28); Rockhampton, Queensland
- Burial place: Rockhampton, Queensland (1975); Cherbourg, Queensland (2022)

Queenie Hart (born c.1947) was a 28-year-old Aboriginal Australian woman who was murdered in Rockhampton, Queensland on approximately 14 April 1975.

No person has ever been convicted of her murder. Family members and supporters have attributed this to racial prejudice from the police, the media and the legal system, which have all been accused of downplaying the severity of the crime because the victim was Aboriginal.

== Early life ==
Hart was in the Cherbourg Aboriginal Settlement, an Aboriginal reserve on Wakka Wakka country, where she grew up. The residents of the settlement were subject to the Aboriginal Protection Act which led to an oppressive and restricted life.

Hart became a member of Murgon Impara's marching girls team which had considerable success, winning the Australian championships in 1960. Her involvement with the sport led to extensive touring which saw her travel throughout Queensland and down to Melbourne. Hart eventually arrived in Rockhampton, where she began staying with an aunty.

== Murder investigation ==
=== Discovery of body ===
In April 1975, Hart's body was discovered in mangroves alongside the Fitzroy River at Lakes Creek.

=== Kiem arrested and charged ===
The day after her body was found, police arrested and charged Steven Henry Kiem with murder.

Three months later, Kiem's murder trial commenced in the Rockhampton Supreme Court. However, shortly after it had commenced the judge suddenly announced that the murder charge against Kiem would be dropped as he believed a jury could not be satisfied beyond reasonable doubt that Kiem was responsible for Hart's death.

This was despite a taxi driver preparing to give testimony, and allegations that Kiem had already confessed to killing Hart after having sexual intercourse and then using her clothes to bound her arms behind her body before abandoning her and ignoring her pleas for help.

In 2020, Kiem's ex-wife and his stepdaughter both told the Pendulum crime podcast that he had confessed to them that he had killed Hart. During the podcast, his ex-wife stated: "He said he did it... I knew he was serious. He put a knife on me and everything. I was frightened of him" while his stepdaughter said: "He came home that night and that's when he said to her (Mum) that he had killed a lady and then he told her how he done it and everything. When Mum said, 'Oh, you must've got shocked', he said, 'Yeah, well, if you say anything, I'm gonna do it to you'". Both women also accused Kiem of domestic violence and child sexual abuse. Kiem's ex-wife also recalled his arrest on 20 April 1975 while on a train from Rockhampton to Springsure.

=== Allegations of racial prejudice ===
Writing for The Guardian in 2021, journalist Amy McQuire said she believed that Hart was subject to dehumanising depictions by the media and the courts which contributed to justice not being served for Hart's death.

McQuire singled out The Morning Bulletin, criticising the local newspaper for labelling Hart as a prostitute (despite not having anything to verify the claim) while describing the accused by his occupation as a railway fettler. McQuire also accused the police of failing or deliberately refusing to investigate the deaths of Aboriginal people, particularly women, and of dehumanising Aboriginal women. McQuire also described the Australian legal system as viewing Aboriginal women as disposable.

Writing for News Corp Australia in 2022, journalist Sherele Moody shared similar views and said the Hart murder was a "shining example" of how women of colour had been let down by the Australian legal system while also accusing the media of framing the suspect into a "regular hard working bloke".

=== Kiem's suspected involvement in second death ===
Kiem moved north to Sarina shortly after the trial and around 1980 changed his name to Christopher Edward Turner. While living in Sarina, he was jailed for drunk driving and domestic violence offences in the 1990's.

Some members of the police service suspected he had changed his name after the murder of Margaret Kirstenfeldt in Sarina in 1978. Kiem had lived several houses from Kirstenfeldt when she was found dead outside her home on 10 February 1978.

Kiem was re-interviewed in 2001 by detectives working on Taskforce Alex, who were investigating Rockhampton serial killer Leonard Fraser. Kiem and Fraser had twice served sentences alongside each other at the Rockhampton Correctional Centre at Etna Creek. When Fraser was released after serving a 12-year sentence for rape, he lived with Kiem in Yeppoon.

Kiem was again re-interviewed in 2004 by cold case detectives investigating Kirstenfeldt's death.

There were obvious similarities between the deaths of Queenie Hart and Margaret Kirstenfeldt, such as both victims being of similar ages and both sustaining internal injuries to their genitalia. However, after initially being treated as a rape and murder, Kirstenfeldt's death was eventually ruled as a suicide.

Despite this, the lead investigator into Kirstenfeldt's death Milton Hasenam confided in his son that he strongly believed that she had been murdered although he had concluded she had taken her own life in the final report he had submitted to the coroner.

=== Investigation closed ===
The Hart murder investigation is now inactive, although it had been reviewed several times. The case was never re-opened due to no further evidence being produced which could have potentially triggered double jeopardy laws for Kiem to be re-tried for murder.

Police closed the investigation in 2021 after Steven Henry Kiem, the only person suspected to be involved with Hart's murder, died on 11 September 2019 at the age of 69.

Queensland Police Service Acting Commissioner Mike Condon said his view is that the file would now be classed as inactive with no further action to be taken due to a number of factors including Kiem's death, the lack of potential for new evidence, the age of any surviving witnesses. He said that all opportunities to bring Hart's killer to justice had been "extinguished".

Condon said he believed the jury should have heard Kiem's alleged admissions to his then-wife of tying up the victim and leaving her in a location where she couldn't reach a place of safety.

In 2021, police said that despite the cold case now classed as inactive, they would still encourage anyone with new information about Hart's murder to come forward.

== Burials ==
Hart was buried in an unmarked grave in the North Rockhampton Cemetery during a funeral on 24 April 1975, which very few people attended due to Hart's family living so far away. Hart's mother was denied the opportunity to travel to Rockhampton for the funeral by a government inspector who considered it to be an inappropriate use of money.

After her family raised $20,000 through a crowdfunding platform, Hart's remains were exhumed in August 2022 and returned to Cherbourg to fulfil the wish of Hart's mother who died in 1983. Janey Hart had always wanted to bring her daughter back to Wakka Wakka country for a burial but this had been denied.

An exhumation of Hart's remains at the North Rockhampton Cemetery was expected to occur in July 2021 but this was delayed until August 2022 when they were finally returned to Cherbourg where eight of her siblings are buried.

The traditional owners of the land the North Rockhampton Cemetery sits on, the Darumbal people, held a corroboree and smoking ceremony before the exhumation. A celebration of Hart's life and a smoking ceremony was then held at the Cherbourg cemetery on 5 August 2022.
