= Bakers Creek air crash =

1943 military airplane crash in Australia

USAAF B-17C 40-2072
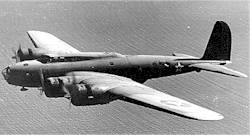
- A similar USAAC B-17C

Accident
- Date: 14 June 1943
- Summary: Crashed on take-off; cause unknown
- Site: Bakers Creek, Queensland, Australia; 21°13.20′S 149°08.82′E

Aircraft
- Aircraft type: Boeing B-17 Flying Fortress
- Aircraft name: Pamela, Miss Every Morning Fixin
- Operator: United States Army Air Forces
- Registration: 40-2072
- Occupants: 41
- Passengers: 35
- Crew: 6
- Fatalities: 40
- Injuries: 1
- Survivors: 1

The Bakers Creek air crash was an aviation disaster that occurred on 14 June 1943, when a United States Army Air Forces (USAAF) Boeing B-17 Flying Fortress aircraft crashed at Bakers Creek, Queensland, Australia. The aircraft took off from Mackay and crashed approximately 8 km (5.0 mi; 4.3 nmi) south of the airfield. Forty military service personnel (all US) on board were killed; one person survived the crash.

This air crash in June 1943 was followed by the military Rewan air crash in November 1943 (killing 19 persons) and the military Canal Creek air crash in December 1943 (killing 31 people). The Bakers Creek air crash is Australia's deadliest aviation disaster by death toll, and was the deadliest accident involving a transport aircraft in the south-western Pacific during World War II.

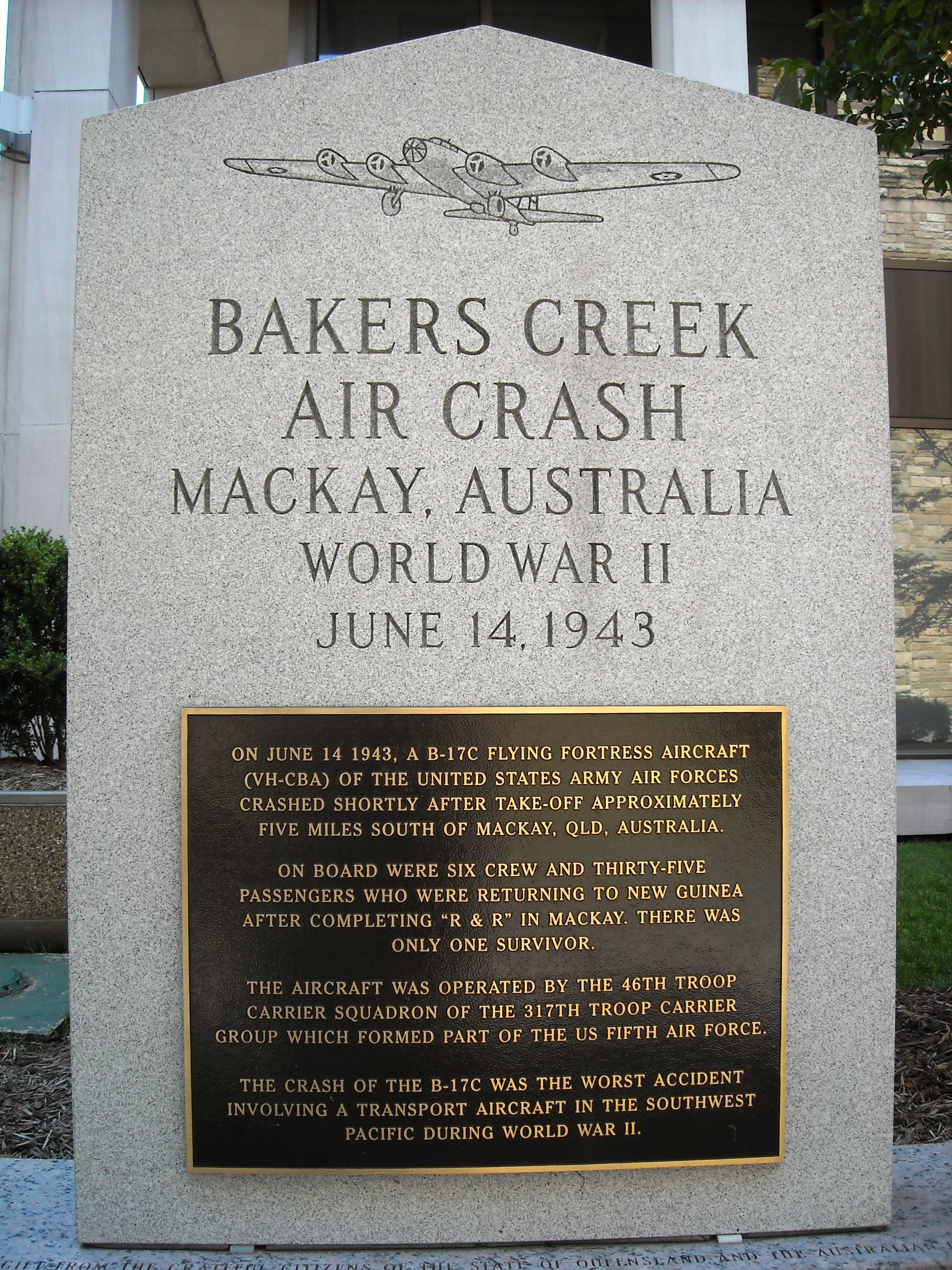
Bakers Creek air crash memorial at the Australian embassy in Washington, D.C.

== Aircraft ==
The aircraft was a Boeing B-17C, serial number 40-2072, originally known as Pamela and later known as "Miss Every Morning Fixin".

The six crew and 35 passengers were returning to New Guinea after an R&R break. The aircraft was part of the United States Fifth Air Force, operated by the 46th Troop Carrier Squadron of the 317th Troop Carrier Group. It had formerly been one of the B-17s sent to the Philippines in the autumn of 1941 with the 19th Bomb Group. It had been converted into a transport after suffering heavy battle damage in a mission on 25 December 1941. Over 1,100 bullet holes were found when the plane returned to Darwin.

The plane earned its nickname "Miss Every Morning Fixin" due to the constant work needed to keep it airworthy. A former maintenance chief estimated that for every eight hours the aircraft flew, it required at least twelve hours of maintenance. During the ten days before the plane's last flight, mechanics installed a new fuel tank and two new engines, and a satisfactory test flight was made on the previous day: "she flew around and around the city many times".

== Crash ==
The aircraft took off from Mackay Airfield just before dawn at about 6:00 am in foggy conditions, headed for Port Moresby. Flames were seen along the fuselage and the wings. Soon after, it made a low-altitude turn and crashed a few minutes later. All but one person on board was killed. The sole survivor was in the tail space which had broken off as the plane crashed. The cause of the crash remains a mystery.

Due to wartime censorship, there was no press coverage of the accident. Deceased members were moved to a Townsville war cemetery.

Australia's equal second deadliest aviation disaster, the 1960 crash of Trans Australia Airlines Flight 538, also occurred at Mackay Airfield.

== Memorials ==
A memorial was unveiled at Bakers Creek, near Mackay, Australia, on 11 May 1992, consisting of two brick columns aligned northwards on which are mounted flag poles and two brass plaques facing eastwards. Between the columns is a large aircraft propeller of a type fitted to Douglas C-47 airplanes supplied to the Royal Australian Air Force. The plaques describe the crash and list the men known to have perished and the sole survivor. Above the monument is a brass model of a B-17C that was unveiled and saluted by a low-flying 5th AF United States Air Force Lockheed C-130 from Yokota AB, Japan, on 15 June 2003, during 60th Anniversary events marking the crash. A small brass plaque tells about the model. Two brass plaques representing the 46th Troop Carrier Squadron and the 5th Air Force Memorial Foundation are mounted on a plinth in front of the Bakers Creek Memorial. Inside, a spotlight illuminates the memorial for several hours each night. Annual commemorative ceremonies are held at the memorial, usually in June.

Another memorial to the US service members was unveiled in Washington, D.C., on 14 June 2006, at the World War II Memorial. After the unveiling, it was moved temporarily to the Embassy of Australia, Washington, D.C. Because embassies are considered foreign soil, the Bakers Creek Memorial Association (USA) petitioned American lawmakers to relocate the memorial. After several years of negotiation, a dedication ceremony took place on 11 June 2009 at the Selfridge Gate entrance—in Fort Myer, Virginia—to Arlington National Cemetery.

== See also ==
- List of disasters in Australia by death toll
- United States Army Air Forces in Australia
