= Derek Mollison =

Australian rules footballer

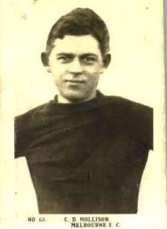

Personal information
- Full name: Crawford Derek Mollison
- Born: 22 October 1901; South Yarra, Victoria
- Died: 19 December 1943 (aged 42); Yaamba, Central Queensland
- Original team: Old Melburnians (MAFA)
- Height: 189 cm (6 ft 2 in)
- Weight: 81 kg (179 lb)

Playing career^{1}
Years	Club	Games (Goals)
1923–1928	Melbourne	66 (30)

Representative team honours^{2}
Years	Team	Games (Goals)
1924–1925	Victoria	4 (-)
- ^{1} Playing statistics correct to the end of 1928.^{2} Representative statistics correct as of 1925.

Crawford Derek Mollison (22 October 1901 – 19 December 1943) was an Australian rules footballer who played with Melbourne in the Victorian Football League (VFL). He died while serving in the Second Australian Imperial Force when an aircraft in which he was a passenger crashed at Canal Creek, near Yaamba, Queensland.

== Family ==
The son of Crawford Henry Mollison (1863–1949), the Victorian Government Pathologist, and his second wife, Elizabeth Corientia Mollison (1869–1920), née Browne, daughter of Thomas Alexander Browne a.k.a. Rolf Boldrewood, Crawford Derek Mollison was born, in South Yarra, on 22 October 1901.

He married Muriel Wallis Ludbrook on 2 July 1924; they had two children, Barbara (1925-), and Graeme (1929-).

His wife's brother, Campbell Malcolm Ludbrook, died (on 11 February 1922) as a result of the severe head injuries he sustained when an aeroplane in which he was a passenger crashed near Mildura; the pilot, a friend of Ludbrook's, did not have a pilot's license, and the aeroplane had been denied a certificate of airworthiness by the Department of Civil Aviation.

Crawford Derek Mollison died in an aircraft crash in Queensland while serving with the Second AIF on 19 December 1943.

== Education ==
Educated at Melbourne Grammar School, he was an excellent schoolboy cricketer, and footballer.

== Football ==
On leaving school, he played football for Old Melburnians Football Club in the Metropolitan Amateur Football Association.

A Victorian representative, he retired at a young age to pursue a business career.

== Military service ==
He enlisted in the Second AIF, and served in both the Middle East and in New Guinea.

== Death ==
On 19 December 1943, Mollison was one of 31 people on board when a C-47 Dakota aircraft of the 22nd Transport Squadron, 374th Troop Carrier Group crashed at Canal Creek, near Yaamba, Queensland, north of Rockhampton in Central Queensland. The plane, which was flying from Townsville to Brisbane, was carrying 20 US Armed Services personnel, two non-combatants, as well as Mollison and seven other members of the Australian Defence force.

It was the second-worst air disaster in Australian history; there were no survivors.

== See also ==
- List of Victorian Football League players who died on active service
