= Henry Kellow =

Henry Arthur Kellow (8 July 1881 – 6 September 1935) was a Scottish-born Australian literary critic, author and teacher.

== Early life ==
Kellow was born at St Andrews in Fife on the east coast of Scotland.

He attended Airdrie Academy, Glasgow University and a teacher training college where he qualified as a teacher with a Diploma of Education. Kellow graduated from Glasgow University as a Master of Arts with Honours in English and History. Additionally, Kellow also gained a Diplôme d'études en langue française illustrating his improved linguistic skills after studying in France, Italy and Norway.

Commencing his teaching career in 1904, Kellow taught at Calderbank Public School, then Airdrie Academy before being appointed Head of English at Allan Glen's School in Glasgow.

In 1912, Kellow was offered a number of lucrative positions. He had to decide between an inspectorship with the Scottish Education Department, a position as a principal in India, and the headship of a private school in Australia.

Kellow chose the latter. His fiancée Mary Hope agreed to bring their scheduled wedding date forward so they could travel to Australia together after their wedding and settle in Rockhampton, Queensland, to take up the post as headmaster of the Rockhampton Boys Grammar School.

== Life in Australia ==
The trustees of the school were informed of Kellow's appointment by cablegram in May 1912. The local Rockhampton press approved of Kellow's appointment and published glowing testimonials to illustrate its point.

Kellow and his wife were officially welcomed to the school on 15 July 1912 at the annual reunion of past Rockhampton Grammar School students.

During his tenure, Kellow developed considerable influence. It was Kellow who persuaded the trustees of the school in 1913 to allow Jack Fryer another year of study after he was unsuccessful in gaining a university scholarship. Fryer was eventually won the scholarship and was accepted into the University of Queensland.

Kellow had interactions with a number of notable people, including British book publisher George G. Harrap who stayed in Rockhampton for two weeks at Kellow's invitation while Harrap was visiting Sydney in 1924. Kellow's works had been earlier published through Harrap's publishing house, although the two had met while Kellow was teaching at Allen Glen's School in Glasgow.

Kellow's interactions with other dignitaries are recalled in Lorna McDonald's book about his life The Moving Mind, including Shakespearean actor Allan Wilkie, Queensland Governor Matthew Nathan, Governor-Generals Lord Munro Ferguson and Lord Forster, Japanese consul Iemasa Tokugawa, cricketer Don Bradman, swimmer Noel Ryan and local political figure Frank Forde.

During their time in Rockhampton, Kellow and his wife had three children Mary, Hope and Harry.

== Writing ==
While attending the University of Glasgow, Kellow had the opportunity to learn from and be influenced by notable figures such as Sir Henry Jones who later described Kellow as a distinguished student due to the excellence of his written essays; and Walter Raleigh who said that he bore witness to Kellow's great ability and "unflagging energy of mind".

Kellow's first work was A Practical Training in English, an English text book Kellow had written in 1909 using his training in literary appreciation. It was described by the secretary of the English Association as the best English text book of its kind they had ever seen.

Following the completion of A Practical Training in English, Kellow was invited by the general editor of George G. Harrap and Co.'s "Poetry and Life" series to critique the works of Scotland's Robert Burns. As a result, Burns and his Poetry was published in 1911.

Burns and his Poetry was quickly followed by Kellow's anthology A Treasury of Scottish Verse published in 1912, which was a collection of poems from the 14th to the 19th centuries which Kellow analysed. The preface to A Treasury of Scottish Verse was written in the Bay of Biscay while Kellow and his wife were en route to Australia.

After a 15-year break from writing, Kellow seemed to have his interest in poetry and literature re-ignited. In his 1981 biography, The Moving Mind, historian Lorna McDonald suggests it may have been due to a combination of three events of 1924 consisting of Jeremiah Joseph Stable publishing The Bond of Poetry, Nettie Palmer publishing Modern Australian Literature and the visit from George Harrap which likely would have led to discussions about literature potentially planting the idea for Kellow to publish another work.

Whatever the reason behind it, Kellow finally published what was arguably his best known work, Queensland Poets in 1930.

Queensland Poets was, as the title suggests, a detailed analysis of the work of Queensland poets which received favourable reviews from newspaper critics.

== Shooting ==
On 30 August 1919, Kellow was seriously injured when he was shot in a random shooting while he, his wife and two children were en route to Yeppoon in their Overland motorcar.

James Arthur Thompson and Eugine Berserker Onions were charged with discharging a loaded firearm with the intent to kill.

Somewhat unusually, the hearing at the Rockhampton Police Court on 8 October 1919 adjourned to the Hillcrest Hospital where Kellow was a patient recovering from his injuries so he could testify. After adjourning back to the court house, the police magistrate committed Thompson and Onions to stand trial the following month.

Thompson and Onions were both found guilty by a jury of grievous bodily harm and were both sentenced to seven years imprisonment with hard labour.

News of the shooting was widely reported in the Australian press.

== Death ==
Kellow died from pneumonia on 6 September 1935.

Kellow's funeral consisted of a church service at St Andrew's Presbyterian Church and a graveside service at the North Rockhampton Cemetery.

Prior to the graveside service, a long procession consisting of past and present students of the Rockhampton Grammar School marched from the school to the Fitzroy Bridge following Kellow's coffin before they were transported to the cemetery where they again made a formation to march to Kellow's grave.

Apart from being headmaster of the Rockhampton Grammar School for 23 years, Kellow was also actively involved in the Rockhampton community and as such his death prompted a number of tributes from various local community organisations, sporting groups and the local press.

== Family ==
After his death, Kellow's widow Mary Hope Kellow moved to Sydney with her daughter Mary. After living at Darlinghurst, Mary bought a house in Eastwood in 1950. She died in 1969. After her cremation, her ashes were brought back to Rockhampton where they were interred in her husband's grave at the North Rockhampton Cemetery.

Even after moving with her mother to Sydney, Kellow's daughter Mary continued to have an interest in the Rockhampton Grammar School, presenting the Mary Kellow Cup at the school's sports carnivals, and presenting the Mary Kellow Champion of Champions Cup at the Rockhampton Eisteddfod. While living in Sydney, she enjoyed partaking in artistic activities particularly painting and music. She was an invited guest to the launch of her father's biography in Rockhampton in 1981 and had expressed her interest in returning to the city following her last visit in 1965. However, she died suddenly on 10 February 1981 after being involved in a minor car accident several days earlier. Her brother Harry claimed she had encountered an aggressive insurance assessor who had caused Mary considerable distress.

Due to her exceptional linguistic skills, Kellow's daughter Hope received a glowing recommendation in 1941 from Frank Forde for a wartime position with the Commonwealth Censorship Department. She commenced work for the Foreign Languages Section of the Army in 1942, which she finished in 1945 at the end of World War II. She then obtained a permanent position of Australian Secretary to the Finnish Legation in Sydney in September 1949, a position she held until her death from cancer in 1965. Upon her reaching 15 years of service to the Finnish Legation in 1964, charge d'affaires Olavi Wanne presented Hope Kellow with the Cross of Merit of the Order of the Lion of Finland.

Kellow's son Harry married Barbara Sams in 1948 while he was a medical resident at the hospital in Maitland, New South Wales. He was then a clinical assistant of obstetrics at St George Hospital before he established a private practice in Roseville Chase on Sydney's North Shore. Harry and Barbara had two children, Roslyn and John who pursued law and medical careers respectively.

Kellow's grandson John Kellow is currently an associate professor and Head of Discipline of Medicine at the University of Sydney's Northern Clinical School, and a gastroenterologist and director of the neurogastroenterology unit at the Royal North Shore Hospital in Sydney. He is also a member of a number of global medical societies such as the American Gastroenterological Association and the European Society of Neurogastroenterology and Motility

Kellow's grandchildren Roslyn McGovern (née Kellow) and John Kellow were both present at the re-launch of their grandfather's biography The Moving Mind in Rockhampton in 2016.

== Legacy ==
In 1931, Kellow was made a Fellow of the Educational Institute of Scotland for his services to education.

One of the four sports houses at the Rockhampton Grammar School is named Kellow.

Kellow Street and Little Kellow Street on The Range at the rear of the Rockhampton Grammar School are named after Kellow.

In 1981, historian Lorna McDonald published a biography of Kellow, which she re-launched at the Rockhampton Grammar School in 2016 at the age of 100. At the original book launch on 24 July 1981, the executive director of the Foundation for Australian Literary Studies at James Cook University, Professor Harry Heseltine presented a Kellow monograph to the trustees of the Rockhampton Grammar School.
