= Hazel Malone Management =

British talent agency

Hazel Malone Management was a British-based talent agency. It represented some of the top British actors and actresses from the 1960s to the 1980s. The agency was established in 1961, and was run by Hazel Malone herself until her death on April 2, 1995.

== Background ==
Prior to establishing her agency, Hazel Malone had worked with her sisters, Rona and Muriel Knight, running a dance academy in Chiswick. One of their first major projects was forming the singing/dancing group the “Corona Babes” in the 1930s. She later married Danny Malone and had one son with him, Cavan Malone.

In 1961, after returning from a world wide tour with her music group, Hazel established a talent agency for adults and all the young actors and actresses who had completed their education at the Corona Academy Stage School (which was run by her sister, Rona Knight). The agency quickly flourished, and eventually Hazel moved into the West End with her headquarters based in the Clarendon House on 11 Clifford Street in London. She also had other office locations, including Park Lane in Stanhope Gate W1. Hazel occasionally hosted small private dinner parties at her personal residence, located on 89 Riverview Gardens in Barnes, which was attended by her selected clients. She also occasionally did business with other talent agents such as Barry Brown, Dennis Selinger, and Felix De Wolfe.

From the 1960s to 1980s, Hazel’s talent agency was one of the most prosperous in the United Kingdom, United States, and Australia. She ran her agency right up to the time of her death in 1995.

== Notable clients ==
=== Actors ===
- Robin Askwith
- David Bowie
- Jeremy Bulloch
- Larry Dann
- Barry Evans
- Kenneth Gilbert
- Frazer Hines
- Malcom McDowell
- Richard O’Sullivan
- Richard Palmer
- Robin Stewart
- Michael Summerton
- Dennis Waterman
- Nicholas Young

=== Actresses ===
- Francesca Annis
- Julie Dawn Cole
- Lynne Frederick
- Judy Geeson
- Sally Geeson
- Susan George
- Candace Glendenning
- Diane Keen
- Janet Key
- Ania Marson
- Judy Matheson
- Mary Maude
- Françoise Pascal
- Luan Peters
- Adrienne Posta
- Carol White
- Serretta Wilson
