= Canal Creek air crash =

1943 air crash in Australia

Coordinates: 22.97974°S 150.48141°E

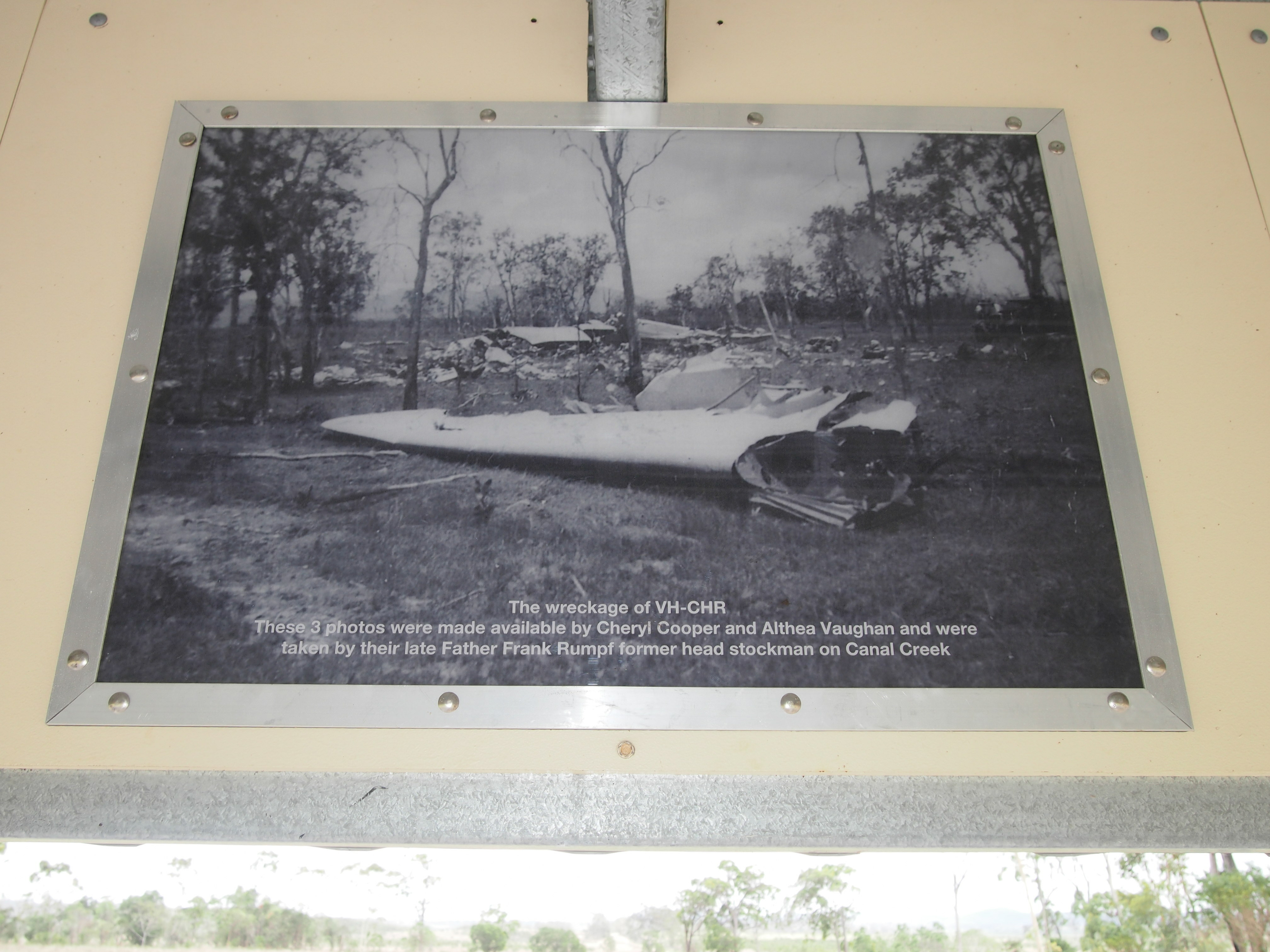
Photo of the crash

The Canal Creek air crash occurred on 19 December 1943, when a C-47 aircraft of the 22d Troop Carrier Squadron 374th Troop Carrier Group crashed at Canal Creek, Queensland, 50 km (31 mi) north of Rockhampton, killing all 31 people (mostly US military personnel) on board.

The Canal Creek air crash occurred just a month after the Rewan air crash near Rolleston, in which 19 Australian and American personnel were killed and six months after the Bakers Creek air crash near Mackay in which 40 military personnel were killed.

== Aircraft ==
The USAAF military transport aircraft Douglas C-47 Skytrain, registration 43-30742, had four crew. It used the call sign VH-CHR, and had the nickname Hoosier Traveler.

== Event ==
The aircraft was en route from its base at RAAF Garbutt, Townsville, to Brisbane with a scheduled stop in Rockhampton. The crash is believed to be caused by a fire in one engine, which caused an explosion, destroying part of the aircraft and causing it to disintegrate and crash.

Due to wartime censorship, there was very little press coverage of the accident, with the few newspaper articles that were published focusing on the non-combatants on-board such as Harold Dick (war photographer), Nigel James MacDonald (YMCA) and William Tibbs (Salvation Army). However, those stories only mentioned that they had been "killed in a plane accident" with no specific details about the disaster.

== Crew and passengers ==
Those killed included twenty United States Armed Forces personnel, eight Australian Defence Force personnel, an Australian war photographer, a representative from the YMCA and an adjutant from the Salvation Army.

Status	Name	Country	City	Notes
Pilot	2nd Lieutenant William R. Crecelius	USA	Indiana	See section below
Co-pilot	2nd Lieutenant John B. Rowell	USA	Michigan	
Engineer	Technical Sergeant John L. Shupe	USA	Virginia	
Radio operator	Sergeant Robert S. Fazio	USA	New York	
Passenger	Technical Sergeant Carlos M. Bane	USA	Pennsylvania	
Passenger	Sergeant Charles F. Dolan	USA	New York	
Passenger	2nd Lieutenant Harry Gillies	USA	New York	
Passenger	2nd Lieutenant William B. Graham	USA	Pennsylvania	
Passenger	Captain Orlen N. Loverin DFC	USA	California	Loverin captained the Doodle; he was on leave, returning to Sydney.
Passenger	Warrant Officer Herbert R. Johnson	USA	New York	
Passenger	Private Herbert J. Mathias	USA	Indiana	
Passenger	Major Hoyt A. Ross	USA	Minnesota	
Passenger	Captain Robert J. Simmons	USA	Florida	
Passenger	Chief Warrant Officer Thomas W. Smith	USA	Georgia	
Passenger	Captain George K. Snyder	USA	Pennsylvania	
Passenger	Gunner's Mate Frank J. Carline	USA	Massachusetts	
Passenger	Lieutenant William W. Samuelsen	USA	New York	
Passenger	Gunner's Mate Jack H. Staggs	USA	California	
Passenger	2nd Lieutenant Ernestine May "Carmen" Koranda	USA	Wadena, Minnesota	US Army nurse, based at 12th Station Hospital, Townsville. Aged 31. (Note: The Minnesota History Center entry says 26 years old, but other records indicate 31.) A United States Army hospital ship was named USAHS Ernestine Koranda.
Passenger	2nd Lieutenant Rebecca M. Williams	USA	Punxsutawney, Pennsylvania	US Army nurse, aged 33.
Passenger	LAC Donald Cantrol Cameron	Australia	Texas, Queensland	No. 36 Squadron RAAF strategic transport squadron.
Passenger	Captain Alexander W. R. Geddes	Australia	Waratah, New South Wales	
Passenger	Captain Crawford D. Mollison	Australia	South Yarra, Victoria	
Passenger	Leading Aircraftman Raymond K. Oster	Australia	Maitland, South Australia	
Passenger	Private Benjamin Rasmussen	Australia	Merrick, Queensland	
Passenger	Corporal Thomas W. Shard	Australia	Ipswich, Queensland	
Passenger	Corporal William B. Sleep	Australia	Brisbane, Queensland	
Passenger	Captain John H. Weir	Australia	Melbourne, Victoria	
Passenger	Harold Arnold George Dick	Australia	Sydney, New South Wales	Aged 26. Film footage taken by Dick over occupied Japanese territory was located and successfully developed.
Passenger	Nigel James Bruce MacDonald	Australia	Neutral Bay, New South Wales	YMCA
Passenger	William Bramwell Tibbs	Australia	Sydney, New South Wales	Deputy Commissioner, Salvation Army.

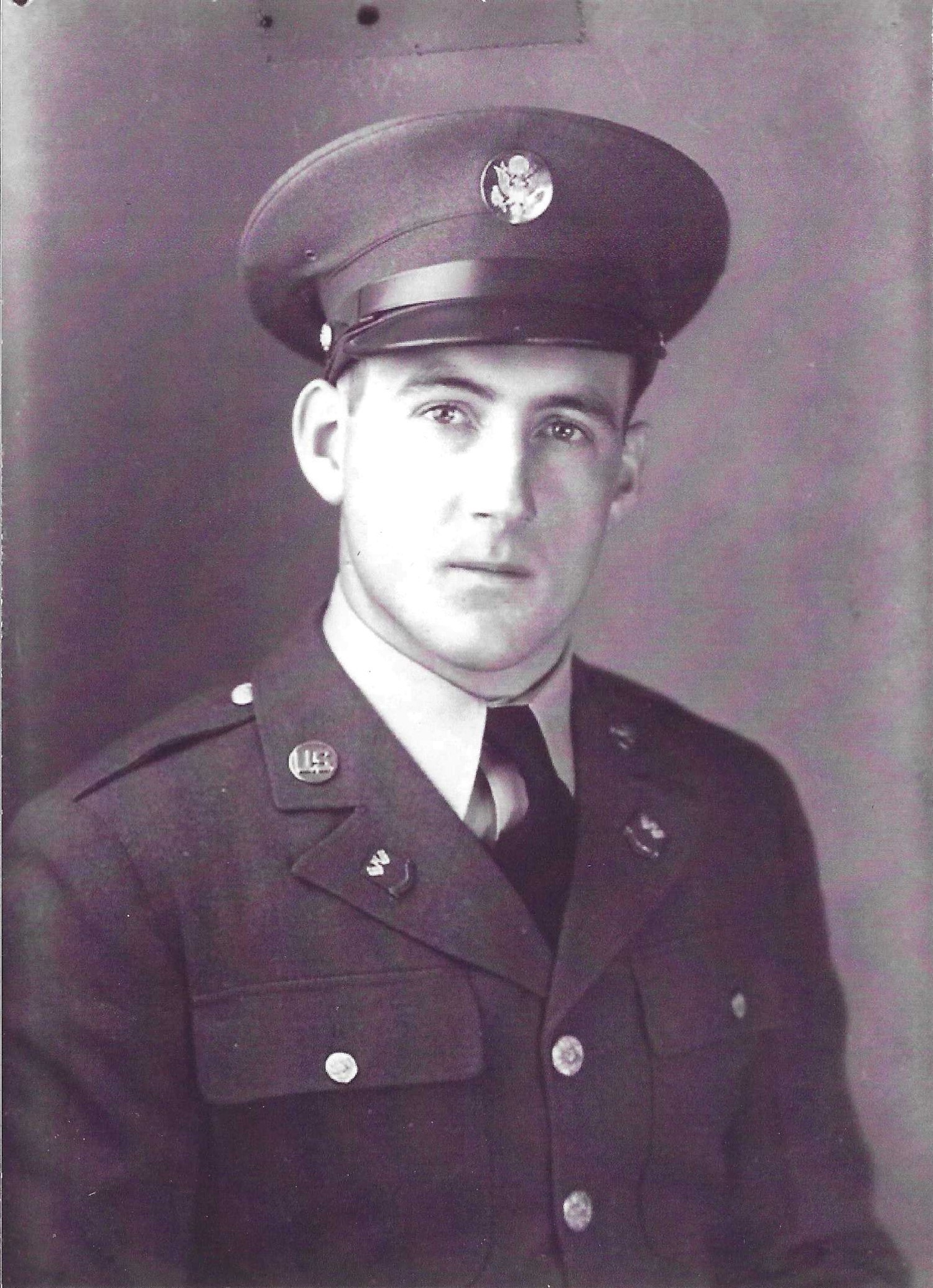
2nd Lieutenant William Randall Crecelius

=== Pilot Randy Crecelius ===
Second Lieutenant William Randall "Randy" Crecelius was born on 21 November 1918 in Gibson County, Indiana. He was the first of five children born to Henry Crecelius and Maude Miley Crecelius.

Crecelius enlisted in the United States Army Air Corps on 26 September 1940. He was eventually assigned to the 22nd Troop Carrier Squadron, 374th Troop Carrier Group. This Squadron operated the Douglas C-47 Skytrain in the South West Pacific Area (SWPA) during the war.

He was awarded the Distinguished Flying Cross on 29 May 1943. His citation included:

He took part in more than fifty missions, dropping supplies and transporting troops over territory that was continually patrolled by enemy fighter aircraft. Often landings were made on fields only a few miles from Japanese bases. These operations aided considerably in the recent success in this theatre.

On the day of the crash he had flown more than 150 combat missions, and 137 flights from Townsville. After his death, it took more than four years to return his body to the United States. He was buried on 11 March 1948 in the family plot of Warnock Cemetery in Princeton, Indiana.

A scholarship in Crecelius' name was established at Oakland City University in 1983, to assist post-secondary education.

== Memorial ==
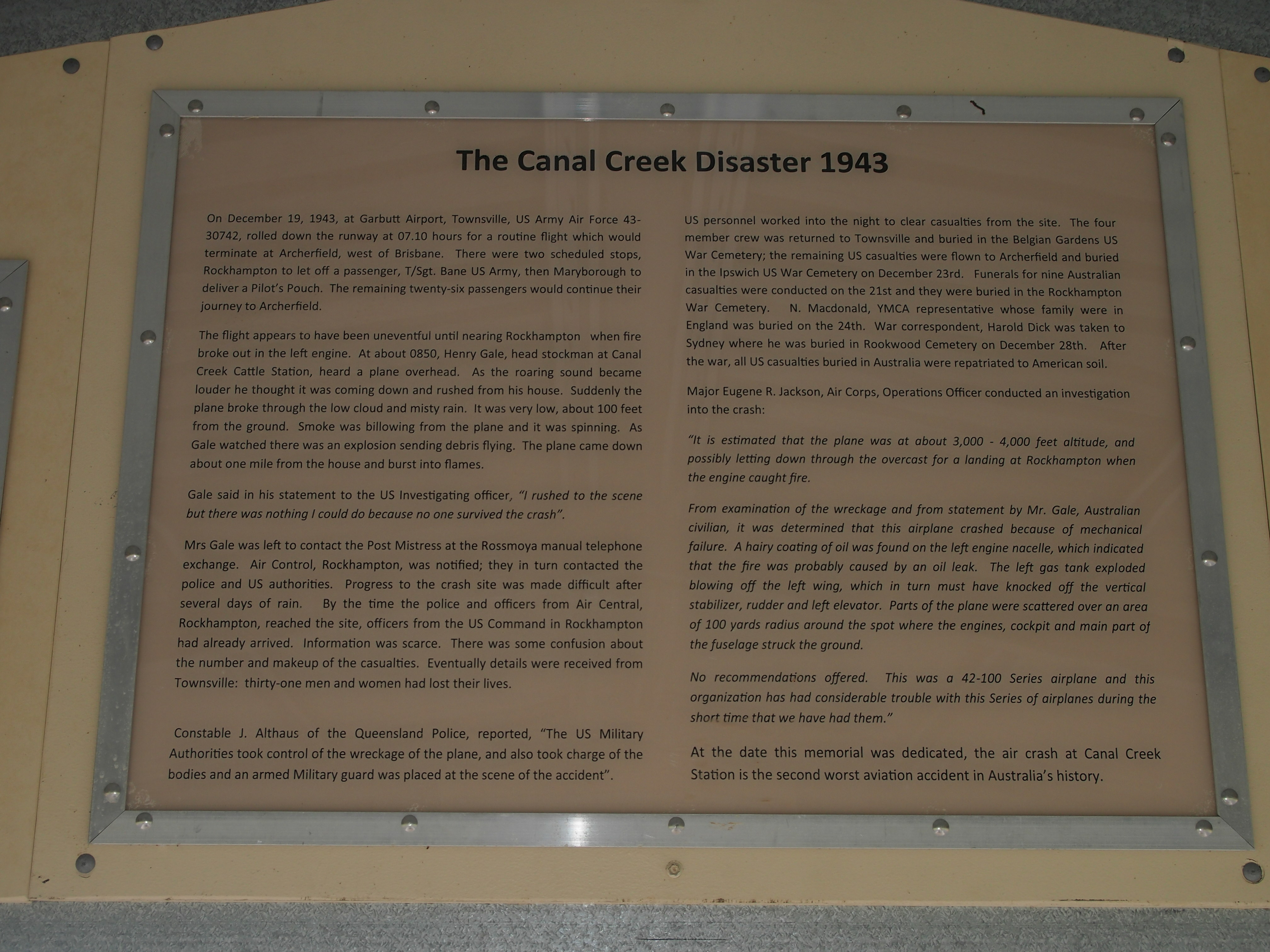
Canal Creek war memorial

With many locals still unaware of the disaster and no historic marker in its place, Yeppoon resident John Millroy began campaigning in 2011–2012 for a permanent memorial at the crash site to commemorate those who died.

After securing $14,000 in government funding, a monument was unveiled by World War II servicemen Neville Hewitt and Yeppoon RSL president Wayne Carter on 16 June 2012. Rockhampton mayor] Margaret Strelow and Queensland Governor Penelope Wensley attended the ceremony. Wensley said it was good the tragedy was being remembered while Strelow praised Millroy for his part in organising the memorial.

Annual memorial services are now held at the crash site. A 75th anniversary commemoration was held in 2018.

== See also ==
- List of accidents and incidents involving the DC-3 in 1943
