= Media portrayals of Indigenous Australians =

Media portrayals of Indigenous Australians have been described by academics and commentators as often negative or stereotyped. It is said that in issues which concern them, the voices of Indigenous Australians (Aboriginal and Torres Strait Islander people) are drowned out by non-Indigenous voices, which present them as problems for the rest of society.

== Portrayals of Indigenous Australians in the news media ==
One 1994 study found that no newspaper managers interviewed believed their papers were racist, but most Aboriginal interviewees believed that mainstream newspapers "failed Aborigines dismally". The same survey found that no major paper had any Indigenous Australians as editors, and that only editors specialising in Indigenous issues had any significant knowledge of Indigenous cultures. Most editors also said that they saw their readership as white, and some conceded that this perception affected their news coverage. In 1992, a systematic survey of mainstream media, including television, news, and radio, found that "the exclusion of (non-stereotyped) diversity is almost total in all the media studied."

In issues specifically relating to Indigenous Australians, Indigenous voices are still dwarfed by non-Indigenous voices in press coverage. One study of the Sydney Morning Herald's coverage of Wik and native title found that only one quarter of relevant articles contained any Indigenous voices.

A 1992 study of several media found that the only highly reported issues relating to multiculturalism (including but not limited to Indigenous issues) were immigration and Indigenous land rights, both of which were presented as "problems for the majority culture." One author has explained that Mabo coverage was so in-depth because Mabo "reached far into the heart of non-Aboriginal Australia." The way in which Mabo was covered also reflected papers' presumed white readership: according to Dunbar, most stories were directed at white audiences, with a clear sense of conflict between "us" and "them." When Mabo was mentioned on the front page, it was almost always portrayed as a potential threat to the population as a whole, as opposed to belated justice for Indigenous Australians. This pattern was also seen in news coverage of a community funeral in Woorabinda that was used as an opportunity to arrest fifty Indigenous people on outstanding fine warrants. The Indigenous community was outraged, but the local paper reported the arrests without any mention of their happening at a funeral. The paper's chief of staff explained this way: "We decided there is a perception that the majority of readers don't really care what happened out there. […] There was a blowout over the fact it happened at a funeral and we did not embroil ourselves in the shit fight that blacks hate police and police hate blacks. It would not have achieved anything. We had to make a conscious decision based on our circulation; we had nothing to gain circulation-wise by continuing the fight for days and days."

=== 1990 National Inquiry into Racist Violence ===
In 1990 the Federal government conducted a National Inquiry into Racist Violence. Many people complained to the Inquiry about alleged racism in media reporting. This was recognised by the enquiry as being due in part to there often being a gap between many white media representations of Indigenous people and Indigenous perspectives of their own situations. The report's 64 recommendations included:

- The media have a right and, indeed, a responsibility to report on race issues. The report recognised, however, the concerns of those who gave evidence to the Inquiry.
- The Inquiry was convinced of the importance of codes of practice and recommended their development, where they do not already exist, and their observance by media outlets.
- They also recommended that any proposal to modify or abolish the powers and processes of the Australian Broadcasting Tribunal take into account the need to retain an effective avenue for the handling of complaints of racism and racial vilification in the media.
- The Inquiry commended initiatives taken by some media organisations to encourage the recruitment and advancement of journalists from Aboriginal and non-English speaking backgrounds and encouraged all media organisations to follow this example. The Inquiry also believed that more emphasis also needs to be placed on cross-cultural training and education for cadet journalists.
- The Inquiry also recognised the need for antidiscrimination bodies to provide regular opportunities for consultation and exchange of views between media representatives and community spokespeople.

=== Royal Commission into Aboriginal Deaths in Custody (1987 -1991) ===
The Royal Commission into Aboriginal Deaths in Custody also made recommendations proposing the development of codes of practice and policies relating to the presentation of Aboriginal issues; the establishment of monitoring bodies and the putting into place of training and employment programs for Aboriginal people.

=== Bill Leak cartoon ===
A cartoon that portrayed an Aboriginal father holding a beer can and unable to remember his son's name was published in The Australian newspaper in 2016. The cartoon was created by Bill Leak, a cartoonist already familiar to controversy. The cartoon was reported to the Australian Human Rights Commission, which chose to investigate whether the cartoon breached section 18c of the Racial Discrimination Act 1975. Although the case was later dropped by the Commission, there was immense public discussion about whether the cartoon should be allowed under Freedom of speech. The Liberal government also proposed erasing section 18c of the Racial Discrimination Act 1975 to protect what they allege is a matter of "freedom of speech".

== The nobles and savages paradox ==
Frances Peters-Little, an Aboriginal film-maker, has observed that television portrayals of Indigenous people are divided into nobles or savages. At the savage end of the pole is the portrayal of Aboriginal criminality in the mainstream news media. Many systematic content reviews of mass media have found that the race of criminal offenders is mentioned more often when the offenders are Aboriginal. Author Heather Goodall has argued that photos used repeatedly in the coverage of the 1987 Brewarrina riot, which took place after an Aboriginal death in custody, illustrate how mainstream media pander to whites' expectations of Aboriginal violence. The first of two iconic images depicted a young Aboriginal man throwing a stone at a hotel, evoking "an Aboriginal threat to the country pub, that symbol of Australian rural life, mateship and social networks." The second, a photo of a breaking window, was shot so close-up that one can no longer recognize the image as one of Brewarrina; instead, one could only see an Indigenous Australian relentlessly destroying white property.

These negative images, however, coexist with "invariably positive and sympathetic" portrayals of Aboriginals in advertisements and documentaries, which typically depict them in "'traditionalist' roles, dress, poses, and activities." For example, one study of 100,000 seconds of Australian advertising found that the only Indigenous Australians pictured were children with painted faces. Documentary film-making about Indigenous subjects generally also centers on traditional culture in northern and central Australia, neglecting the more urban areas of the south and east. One author has suggested that these positive images of Indigenous Australians can coexist with the negative news images because advertisements and documentaries depict Indigenous Australians as distant from the modern world; only when they interact with contemporary society are they seen as threatening.

== See also ==
- History wars
