= Murder of Emily Salsbury =

1910 murder in Australia

Emily May Salsbury (26 July 1885 – 15 June 1910) was an Australian woman who was killed in a busy local street in Rockhampton, Queensland on 15 June 1910. She was fatally shot by her former fiancé, local jockey Arthur Robert Davis, son of former Rockhampton town clerk, William Davis.

== Shooting ==
Davis shot and killed Salsbury in William Street outside St Paul's Day School, next to St Paul's Cathedral, where an evening social function was being held. Salsbury had been sitting in a horse-drawn sulky, having just transported some children to the event, and was in conversation with Roland Hett when the shooting occurred.

The shooting was witnessed by police sergeant Thomas Seymour who was talking to a shopkeeper at a local confectionery store on the opposite side of the street when Davis began firing. Seymour witnessed Hett fall to the ground after being shot, and then saw Davis kill Salsbury as she sat in the sulky. Seymour rushed over and attempted to disarm Davis. Davis attempted to shoot Seymour at point blank range during the struggle but failed to do so as the magazine cartridge was spent. With the aid of another man, Seymour successfully restrained Davis.

Hett was seriously injured and taken to Rockhampton Hospital where he spent almost a month recovering before being discharged on 7 July 1910. After a post-mortem examination, Salsbury's body was buried in the South Rockhampton Cemetery.

== Trial ==
On 8 July 1910, Davis was committed to stand trial at the Rockhampton Supreme Court. With Davis' counsel raising concerns, the judge directed a jury be impanelled to decide whether Davis was capable of understanding the proceedings of a trial. After the government medical officer presented evidence regarding Davis' mental health, the jury retired to consider their decision, returning 35 minutes later stating they found Davis not capable of understanding proceedings so as to make a proper defence, and thus the trial was delayed.

After spending time in the Goodna Asylum, Davis eventually stood trial in Rockhampton commencing on 20 November 1911. During evidence, Salsbury's mother told the court that Davis and her daughter had been briefly engaged between 25 December 1907 and late January 1908, but the engagement was broken off by Salsbury. Following this Davis continuously pursued Salsbury, desperately attempting to convince her to recommence the relationship. Two doctors presented evidence concluding that Davis was in such a state of mental disease that he was deprived of the capacity to control his actions when he murdered Salsbury.

=== Verdict ===
Despite certainty that Davis was the man who killed Emily Salsbury, the jury returned a verdict of not guilty on the grounds of insanity. The judge ordered Davis be kept in custody at Brisbane Gaol while awaiting advice from King George V.

== Recognition of Thomas Seymour ==
As part of the 1912 New Year Honours, Seymour was awarded the King's Police Medal for "courageous and efficient conduct" for disarming and arresting Davis, and for the immediate assistance he provided at the scene. The medal was due to be presented to Seymour by Queensland Governor, Sir William MacGregor at an official function in October 1912, but Seymour was unable to attend. MacGregor paid tribute to Seymour, saying his bravery was a good example of the personal danger police officers put themselves in while performing their duty.

== See also ==
- Murder of Fanny Hardwick
