= Rewan air crash =

Aviation accident in Australia

The Rewan air crash occurred on 16 November 1943 when a Dakota C-47 of the 21st Troop Carrier Squadron of the 374th Troop Carrier Group crashed at Rewan, Queensland, south of Rolleston, Queensland, killing all 19 people (mostly Australian military personnel) on board.

== Aircraft ==
The USAAF Douglas C-47 Skytrain, registration 42-23420, (Note: One of three sources gives the registration as 42-23589.) nickname Pushy Cat, had four crew.

== Incident ==
The aircraft was en route from Darwin to Brisbane, having already completed scheduled stops in Daly Waters and Cloncurry.

It is believed the aircraft encountered a violent electrical storm at the Carnarvon Gorge, south of Rolleston which caused it disintegrate and crash 2.4 kilometres (1.5 mi) SSE of Rewan Station. The wreckage was discovered on 18 November 1943.

Due to wartime censorship, there was no press coverage of the Rewan disaster at the time, which was similar to what occurred following the Canal Creek air crash north of Rockhampton and the Bakers Creek air crash near Mackay. There was only a fleeting mention of both the Rewan and Canal Creek disasters in Rockhampton's local newspaper The Morning Bulletin in September 1945 at the conclusion of World War II, almost two years after the disasters.

== Personnel ==
Those killed consisted of fourteen military personnel from the Australian Army and the Royal Australian Air Force, and five personnel from the United States Army Air Corps.

The bodies recovered from the wreckage were initially taken to Springsure before being transported to Rockhampton. The bodies of the US military were then taken to Ipswich where they were buried, before being returned to the United States. The bodies of the Australian military were buried in the Rockhampton War Cemetery at the North Rockhampton Cemetery on 25 November 1943.

== Memorial ==
A memorial, which consists of the aircraft's engines, wings and undercarriage, was erected near the crash site in 2004. It was dedicated at a special ceremony on 26 April 2004.

== See also ==
- Bakers Creek air crash, Mackay, 1943.
- Canal Creek air crash, Rockhampton, 1943.
