= Death of Flora Prior =

Australian rape and manslaughter case (1947)

Flora Prior
- Born: 1921
- Died: 25 February 1947 (aged 25–26); Rockhampton, Queensland, Australia
- Burial place: North Rockhampton Cemetery
- Occupation: Domestic servant
- Known for: Victim of rape and manslaughter

Flora Prior (1921–1947) was an Australian woman who was raped and killed by three men on the banks of the Fitzroy River in Rockhampton, Queensland, on 25 February 1947. 18-year-old lad porter Ernest Joseph Davidson, 21-year-old station hand Roy Joseph Howard and 20-year-old labourer Mark Mathieson Dean were convicted of Prior's manslaughter.

The case drew attention from the national press due to the sexual and violent nature of Prior's death, but also because of the actions of Judge Frank Brennan during the trial, including his angry response to those sitting in the public gallery and his subsequent ban on members of the public viewing the trial. The sentence Brennan imposed on the three men responsible, which Brennan acknowledged was lenient, also prompted anger from the victim's family, the press, and the public. A successful appeal by the Attorney-General of Queensland more than doubled the original sentence.

== Investigation ==
A man walking along Quay Street discovered a woman's body on the riverbank between William and Denham Street, less than 150 metres from the Commercial Hotel in the city centre at approximately 8:15am on 26 February 1947. Initial police investigations indicated the woman had been suffocated, possibly by a hand placed over her mouth and fingers closing her nostrils. Police believed she had been murdered on 25 February 1947, just before midnight.

Police found the body belonged to 25-year-old Flora Prior, who had been staying at the People's Palace in Denison Street, Rockhampton, and who had been employed as a domestic servant for Alpha cattle station owner Carrie May Everingham. Originally from Cooktown, Prior had arrived in Rockhampton from Alpha six weeks prior for a holiday, but had recommenced working for Everingham upon Everingham's arrival in Rockhampton.

Prior's funeral was held on 28 February 1947. Fifty people gathered outside the funeral parlour on the corner of Alma and Archer streets to watch the hearse and mourning coach leave for the funeral, with a group also gathering to watch the vehicles cross the Fitzroy Bridge on their way to the North Rockhampton Cemetery where Prior's body was buried.

== Court proceedings ==
Davidson, Howard and Dean were arrested and charged with wilful murder. They appeared in the Petty Session Court on 6 March 1947, with 100 people peering through windows and doors of the courthouse attempting to view the proceedings. The three men were remanded in custody until 13 March 1947, despite opposition from the men's defence counsel.

In court proceedings at Rockhampton Petty Sessions Court on 13 March 1947, police presented a statement written by Davidson which included confessions to Prior's rape by the three men who had been walking throughout the city, visiting various local hotels, at around 11pm on 25 February 1947. According to testimony, Davidson spoke to Prior and the two went to the riverbank where they "had relations" before being joined by Dean and Howard. Davidson confessed that when Prior had screamed, Dean held a handkerchief over her mouth while Howard and Dean sexually assaulted her. In his statement, Davidson said when Prior collapsed, he believed she had fainted and did not know until the next morning that she had died. A detective alleged that when he saw Davidson, Howard and Dean together, they each admitted to raping Prior and holding a handkerchief over her mouth, while Howard also admitted to hitting Prior after she began pulling his hair. A detective also testified that after locating Dean and Howard in an empty house in Rossmoya, Dean confessed to meeting up with Howard and Davidson after having seen Davidson and Prior "struggle" across Quay Street to the riverbank. Dean also said when he saw the girl stop struggling during the sexual assault, he removed the handkerchief from her mouth to feel for breath, but Davidson told him that she had only "passed out". The detective told the court Dean said the men attempted to revive Prior but were unable to do so and left her body on the riverbank. Several witnesses testified that they had seen the men with Prior, prior to her death.

A doctor testified that a great amount of violence would have been necessary to cause Prior's injuries and that the condition of her body was consistent with a woman who had been raped.

Following several days of evidence, the three men were committed to stand trial in the Rockhampton Supreme Court for the wilful murder of Flora Prior. The trial of commenced on 12 May 1947 and concluded on 14 May 1947, during which a number of witnesses were called to give evidence in front of a 12-person jury.

=== Public gallery ban ===
During the trial, Judge Frank Brennan lost patience with the large number of people in the courtroom's public gallery, admonishing all those who came to observe the trial. Brennan ordered them to go home to "busy yourselves with some useful and necessary employment or occupation rather than remain in court and steep your minds in low, sexual depravity", banning all members of the public from the court and ordering police officers to admit only those closely associated with the case and members of the press.

Brennan later accused the public of having "warped minds" and said they should not be allowed to "satisfy their morbid curiosity". This was the second time in three months Brennan had lost patience with members of the public in his courtroom. Brennan had taken issue with members of the public gallery during a separate non-related rape case the previous February. On a previous occasion, Brennan lectured those in the public gallery stating "this is a filthy case - one of rape. Young girls should be home doing housework and the young men might be better employed cleaning up the backyard." When only a handful of people left, Brennan ordered police to clear the gallery, and those remaining showed reluctance to leave, Brennan angrily exclaimed, "so you won't go? What must morals be coming to. Clear the gallery!". The gallery was eventually cleared of members of the public and the case proceeded.

=== Verdict ===
At the conclusion of the trial, the jury was advised that there was insufficient evidence for a verdict of wilful murder, with only murder, manslaughter or acquittal being permissible. The jury found all three men guilty of manslaughter.

After the jury's verdict was read, Brennan said that because the jury had chosen to be lenient, he too must be lenient in his sentencing, and sentenced the men to seven years imprisonment.

=== Sentencing criticism ===
Brennan's decision to pass a lenient sentence despite the violent nature of Prior's death was met with widespread criticism from the victim's family, the community and the press. This included a scathing editorial in Brisbane's Courier-Mail newspaper, which prompted a rebuke from the defence counsel.

The ensuing anger at the lenient sentence prompted an appeal by Attorney-General David Gledson, after which the sentences for all three men were increased to 15 years imprisonment following a unanimous Court of Criminal Appeal decision. Chief Justice Neal Macrossan said he agreed with the opinion expressed after the trial, and that it could only be dealt with by sentences which were much more severe than those imposed by Brennan.

Brennan left Rockhampton four months later, after having served as a judge in Rockhampton since 1925.
