= List of people legally executed in Queensland =

This is a list of people executed in Queensland. It lists people who were executed by British (and from 1901, Australian) authorities within the modern-day boundaries of Queensland. For people executed in other parts of Australia, see the sidebar.

== 1830s to 1850s ==
- John Bulbridge – 18 December 1830 – Hanged at Moreton Bay for absconding from the penal colony there and committing a robbery at Port Macquarie
- Charles Fagan - 18 December 1830 - Hanged at Moreton Bay for absconding and committing a robbery at Port Macquarie
- Mullan – 3 July 1841 – Indigenous. Hanged at the Windmill, Wickham Terrace, Brisbane, for the murder of surveyor Granville William Chetwynd Stapylton at Mount Lindesay
- Ningavil - 3 July 1841 - Indigenous. Hanged at the Windmill, Wickham Terrace, Brisbane, for the murder of surveyor Granville William Chetwynd Stapylton at Mount Lindsay
- Patrick Fitzgerald - 8 July 1850 - Hanged in front of Brisbane Gaol, Petrie Terrace, for the murder of James Marsden at Gigooman
- Jacob Wagner – 8 July 1850 – Hanged in front of Brisbane Gaol for the murder of James Marsden at Gigooman
- Angee (An Gee) – 6 January 1852 – Chinese. Hanged in front of Brisbane Gaol for the murder of James Holbert in the Burnett district
- Davy – 22 August 1854 – Indigenous. Hanged in front of Brisbane Gaol for the murder of Adolphus Trevethan on Rawbelle station in the Burnett district
- Dundalli – 5 January 1855 – Indigenous. Hanged in front of Brisbane Gaol for the murders of Andrew Gregor and William Boller. This was the last official public execution in Queensland
- William Teagle - 28 July 1857 - Hanged at Brisbane Gaol for the murder of his wife Mary Leighton at Drayton
- Chamery - 4 August 1859 - Indigenous. Hanged at Brisbane for the rape of Mary Treatroff at Dugandan
- Dick - 4 August 1859 - Indigenous. Hanged at Brisbane for the rape of Mary Treatroff at Dugandan

== 1860s ==
- Thomas Woods - 7 December 1860 - Hanged at Brisbane for the murder of Gabriel Morell at Coonambula
- Georgie – 12 Dec 1861 – Indigenous. Hanged at Brisbane for the rape of Bridget Ryan at Little Ipswich
- Tommy - 2 April 1862 - Chinese, real name not recorded. Hanged at Brisbane for the murder of George Lang at Nebo
- Matthew McGuinness - 8 April 1862 - Hanged at Brisbane for the murder of a shepherd named Schaff between Gayndah and Mundubbera
- Alexander Ritchie – 1 August 1864 – Hanged at Toowoomba Gaol for the murder of Charles Owen at Yandilla
- Jackey - 3 November 1865 - Indigenous. Hanged at Brisbane for the murder of Ann Mee at Degilbo
- Rudolf Mornberger - 13 December 1865 - German. Hanged at Brisbane for the murder of Heinrich Bode on the Logan River
- Thomas John Griffin – 1 June 1868 – Police officer and gold commissioner hanged at Rockhampton Gaol for the murder of troopers John Power and Patrick Cahill on the banks of the Mackenzie River while they were on duty escorting a large sum of money from Rockhampton to Clermont
- Billy - 7 December 1868 - Indigenous. Hanged at Brisbane for the rape of Mary Thompson at Tivoli
- Jacob - 17 May 1869 - Indigenous. Hanged at Brisbane for the rape of Jane Knott and Amelia Reichmann at Ideraway
- John Williams – 24 November 1869 – Hanged at Rockhampton for the murder of Patrick Halligan at Eight Mile Island
- George C.F. Palmer – 24 November 1869 – Hanged at Rockhampton for the murder of Patrick Halligan at Eight Mile Island
- Alexander Archibald – 22 December 1869 – Hanged at Rockhampton for abetting the murder of Patrick Halligan at Eight Mile Island.

== 1870s ==
- Gee Lee – 7 March 1870 – Chinese. Hanged at Toowoomba for the murder of Louis Vernon at Caroline sheep station on the Burenda run, in the Warrego district.
- Jacky Whitton – 7 March 1870 – Indigenous. Hanged at Toowoomba for the rape of thirteen-year-old Henrietta Reiss at Bodumba station near Warwick.
- William Prendergast – 28 March 1870 – Hanged at Brisbane for the murder of Patrick Hartnett at Fortitude Valley.
- William Brown (or Bertram) – 29 August 1870 – Hanged at Toowoomba for robbery under arms at Mangalore.
- Donald Ross – 21 November 1870 – Hanged at Rockhampton for the murder of George Rose at Springsure.
- George – 15 May 1871 – Indigenous. Hanged at Rockhampton for the rape of Ellen Manning at Gracemere.
- Dugald - 28 May 1872 - Indigenous. Hanged at Brisbane for the rape of twelve-year-old Catherine Hutchinson south of Gympie.
- Patrick Collins - 29 May 1872 - Hanged at Brisbane for the murder of Simon Zieman at Gunde Gunda Creek near Surat.
- John Garbett - 10 March 1874 - Hanged at Brisbane for the murder of Tom Conroy at Taroom.
- Alick (alias Johnny) - 29 December 1874 - Pacific Islander. Hanged at Brisbane for the rape of eleven-year-old Gertrude Brauer at Doughboy Creek.
- Johnny Clayson – 14 April 1875 – Indigenous. Hanged at Rockhampton for the rape of Johanna Kopp at Palmerville.
- Johann (John) Wenzell - 29 August 1876 - German. Hanged at Brisbane for the murder of Joel Martin at Gabbinbar, Toowoomba.
- George - 18 May 1877 - Pacific Islander. Hanged at Maryborough Gaol for the rape of Mrs McBride.
- Tommy Ah Mow – 18 May 1877 – Pacific Islander. Hanged at Maryborough for the rape of Mrs. McBride.
- James Cunningham - 14 January 1878 - Hanged at Brisbane for the murder of Frank Steinebecker near Cairns.
- Sam Ah Poo - 19 August 1878 - Chinese. Hanged at Brisbane for the murder of M. Fisher McMichael at Bundaleer Plains, near Noorama.
- Ervora (alias Johnny) - 23 December 1878 - Pacific Islander. Hanged at Brisbane for the murder of Charles "the Swede" Andrews near Tambo.
- Joseph Mutter - 9 June 1879 - German. Hanged at Brisbane for the murder of Maria Josephina Steffen at Ravenswood. "When the drop fell the convict's head was completely severed from the body. The executioner attributed this horrible result to the hard condition of the rope, caused by the frost".

== 1880s ==
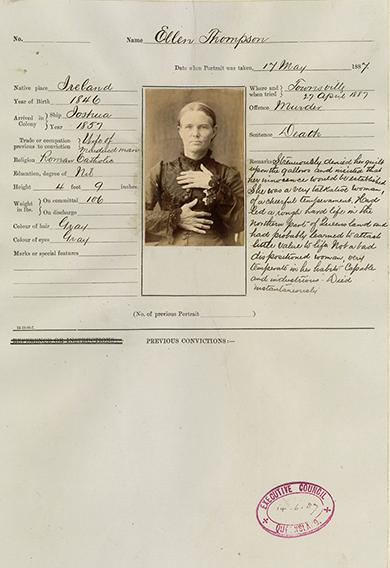
Ellen Thompson, the only woman to be legally hanged in Queensland, 1887

- Joseph Wells - 22 March 1880 - Hanged at Brisbane for armed robbery and attempted murder at Cunnamulla
- James Elsdale (alias Munro) - 31 May 1880 - Hanged at Brisbane for the murder of Michael McEvoy at Belltopper Creek, Aramac
- Jimmy Ah Sue - 31 May 1880 - Chinese. Hanged at Brisbane for the murder of Ah Coo Wah at Copperfield (Clermont)
- Maximus 'Pedro' Gomez - 21 June 1880 - Filipino. Hanged at Brisbane for the murder of William Clarke on Possession Island (Bedanug), Torres Strait
- Kagariu (Johnny Campbell) - 16 August 1880 - Indigenous. Bushranger. Hanged at Brisbane for the rape of Jane MacAlister at Kipper Creek, Northbrook
- Ah Que - 12 December 1881 - Chinese. Hanged at Brisbane for the murder of Ah Wah and Geon Ching at Palmerville
- George Byrne - 22 May 1882 - Hanged at Brisbane for the rape of Susan Isaacs in Elizabeth Street, Brisbane
- Towolar (Jemmy) - 5 June 1882 - From Ambae, New Hebrides. Hanged at Brisbane for the murder of Jeremiah Worth at Bundaberg
- Jango – 15 October 1883 – Indigenous. Hanged at Boggo Road Gaol for the murder of Eliza Mills at Dingo. He was sixteen at the time of his crime
- George – 15 October 1883 – Indigenous. Hanged at Boggo Road Gaol for the rape of thirteen-year-old Johanna Anderson at Gracemere
- James Gardiner (alias McMahon) – 15 October 1883 – Hanged at Boggo Road Gaol for the murder of 'German Ada' at Rockhampton
- Walter Edward Gordon – 25 October 1885 – Hanged at Boggo Road Gaol for the murder of Walter Bunning near Rockhampton
- Tim Tee – 5 April 1886 – Chinese. Hanged at Boggo Road Gaol for the murder of Jimmy Ah Fook at Dulvadilla
- Wong Tong – 21 June 1886 – Chinese. Hanged at Boggo Road Gaol for the murder of Kok Tow near Bundaberg
- Christopher Pickford – 30 May 1887 – Hanged at Boggo Road Gaol for the murder of Martin Emmerson at Ravenswood Junction
- John Harrison – 13 June 1887 – Hanged at Boggo Road Gaol for the murder of William Thompson
- Ellen Thompson – 13 June 1887 – Hanged at Boggo Road Gaol for the murder of her husband William. She was the only woman hanged in Queensland.
- Sedin - 12 November 1888 - Malay. Hanged at Boggo Road Gaol for the murder of John Fitzgerald and Christian Meyriga at Normanton
- Edmond Duhamel - 12 November 1888 - Hanged at Boggo Road Gaol for the murder of Sarah Ann Descury at Croydon

== 1890s ==
- Michael Barry – 2 June 1890 – Hanged at Rockhampton (Wandal) for the murder of his wife Mary. He was the last person to be hanged in Queensland outside of Brisbane
- Donald – 25 April 1892 – Indigenous. Hanged at Boggo Road Gaol for the rape of Eva Scott at Hornet Bank Station near Taroom
- Frank Charles Horrocks – 26 September 1892 – Hanged at Boggo Road Gaol for the murder of Rudolph Weissmüller at Mooraree near Brisbane
- Charles Gleeson – 24 October 1892 – Hanged at Boggo Road Gaol for the murder of Patrick McKiernan at Prince of Wales Island (Muralug), Torres Strait
- Leonardo William Moncado – 24 October 1892 – Hanged at Boggo Road Gaol for the murder of Bob, an Indigenous cabin-boy, on board the Northern coastal trading vessel Sketty Belle
- George Thomas Blantern – 23 October 1893 – Hanged at Boggo Road Gaol for the murder of Flora McDonald at Marlborough Station
- Hatsuro Abe – 28 May 1894 – Japanese. Hanged at Boggo Road Gaol for the murder of a Japanese widow, Omatzie, on Thursday Island
- Miore - 20 May 1895 - Pacific Islander. Hanged at Boggo Road Gaol for the murder of Francis Macartney at Avondale. See Narasemai below
- Narasemai – 20 May 1895 – Pacific Islander. Hanged at Boggo Road Gaol for the murder of Francis Macartney at Avondale
- Sayer (also called Safhour) – 22 July 1895 – Hanged at Boggo Road Gaol for the murder of Peter Anderson near Etowrie near Mackay.
- Jackey – 4 November 1895 – Indigenous. Hanged at Boggo Road Gaol for the murder of Jacky Williams near Mount Morgan.
- Frank Tinyana – 4 November 1895 – Filipino. Hanged at Boggo Road Gaol for the attempted murder of his wife Amelia and the murder of Constable William Conroy on Thursday Island.

== 1900s to 1910s ==
- William Broome – 11 June 1900 – Indigenous. Hanged at Boggo Road Gaol for the murder of Mary Le Blowitz near Bundaberg
- Charles Beckman – 13 May 1901 – Hanged at Boggo Road Gaol for the murder of Alfred Anderson at Bowen
- Wandee (or Wantee) – 27 May 1901 – Pacific Islander. Hanged at Boggo Road Gaol for the murder of Alfred Burnstead near Townsville
- John Rheuben – 30 September 1901 – Hanged at Boggo Road Gaol for the murder of Fanny Hardwick at Rockhampton
- Arafau (or Orifough) – 3 December 1901 – Pacific Islander. Hanged at Boggo Road Gaol for the murder of Morris Summers near Farleigh
- David Alexander Brown - 9 December 1901 - Hanged at Boggo Road Gaol for the murder of Graham Haygarth at Charters Towers
- Patrick Kenniff – 12 January 1903 – Hanged at Boggo Road Gaol for the murder of Constable George Doyle at Lethbridge's Pocket near Carnarvon
- Sow Too Low (or Sotulo) – 22 June 1903 – From Malaita (now part of the Solomon Islands). Hanged at Boggo Road Gaol for the murder of John Martin and Sergeant David Johnston at Mackay Gaol. He was also thought responsible for the murder of 12-year-old Alice Gunning near Mackay
- Gosano (also called 'Kanalso called Charlie') – 17 April 1905 – From Malaita (now part of the Solomon Islands). Hanged at Boggo Road Gaol for the murder of John Parsons at Ingham
- James Wharton (also called Robert Butler) – 17 July 1905 – Hanged at Boggo Road Gaol for the murder of William Munday at Toowong
- Johannes – 14 May 1906 – From Ceylon (Sri Lanka). Hanged at Boggo Road Gaol for the murder of Constable Albert Price
- Twadiga – 14 May 1906 – From Gawa Island (now in Papua New Guinea). Hanged at Boggo Road Gaol for the murder of five-year-old William Baulch, at Homebush, near Mackay
- Look Kow (or Lee Kow) – 31 December 1906 – Chinese. Hanged at Boggo Road Gaol for the murder of Lee Chay Yuen in Townsville
- August Millewski – 16 December 1907 – Hanged at Boggo Road Gaol for the murder of an Indian man, Wallum Nabby, near Nanango
- Bismarck – 19 April 1909 – Indigenous. Hanged at Boggo Road Gaol for the murder of Janet Evitts at Jundah
- Arthur Ross – 7 June 1909 – Hanged at Boggo Road Gaol for the murder of bank clerk James Muir
- Alexander Joseph Bradshaw – 13 June 1910 – Hanged at Boggo Road Gaol for the murder of George and Alice Sutherland at Carron River, near Croydon
- George David Silva – 10 June 1912 – Hanged at Boggo Road Gaol for the murder of seventeen-year-old Maud Ching at Alligator Creek, near Hay Point. On the same occasion he also murdered Maud's younger siblings Teddy, Dolly, Hugh and Winnie, and their mother Agnes
- Charles Deen – 5 May 1913 – From Ceylon (Sri Lanka). Hanged at Boggo Road Gaol for the murder of Peter Dana (Dina, Dinna) at Innisfail
- Ernest Austin – 22 September 1913 – Hanged at Boggo Road Gaol for the murder of Ivy Alexandra Mitchell. He was the last person executed in Queensland
