= Kenniff =

Kenniff is an Irish surname originating in County Kilkenny, Ireland. People named Kenniff include:

- Keith Kenniff, American musician
- Patrick Kenniff (1865–1903) and James Kenniff (1869–1940), criminals in Australia
- Sean Kenniff, American doctor and reality show contestant
