= Murder of Patrick Halligan =

Patrick Halligan (1838 – 25 April 1869) was an Irish-Australian hotel licensee and gold buyer who was murdered in Rockhampton, Queensland on 25 April 1869.

Taking up residence in Rockhampton in 1862 following his migration to Australia from Ireland with his new wife Hannah, Halligan became well known in the local community - as a gold buyer, as a horse racing enthusiast and as licensee of the Lion Creek Hotel on the town's western outskirts in the present-day suburb of Wandal.

In February 1869, Halligan moved on to become the licensee of the rebuilt Albion Hotel in Rockhampton's central business district, which he officially opened under its new name of the Golden Age Hotel on 31 March 1869. Halligan's former hotel, The Lion Creek Hotel, was taken over by Alexander Archibald who had been granted a publican's license. This was despite a prior allegations of criminal behaviour which had led to various court appearances. Archibald would become the brainchild of a plan to rob Halligan of his gold, which ultimately led to the botched robbery resulting in Halligan's murder.

Archibald's plan to rob Halligan as he returned from the Morinish goldfields was carried out by Jack Williams and George Palmer when on the afternoon of 25 April 1869, Williams and Palmer ambushed Halligan on his way back into Rockhampton. However, Halligan refused to give up the gold he was carrying and attempted to shoot Palmer. He missed but Palmer returned fire and shot Halligan in the chest, severely wounding him. Rather than seek medical aid, Williams and Palmer bound the dying Halligan with rope, stole his gold as well as a gold ring from Halligan's finger and concealed Halligan's body by the roadside. They left the scene and waited until after sunset when they returned and retrieved Halligan's dead body, weighed it down and dumped it in the Fitzroy River.

When Halligan failed to return home, concerns about his welfare were raised and an extensive search was organised. Halligan was soon assumed to have been murdered, and a reward of £100 was eventually offered for the discovery of Halligan's body. Halligan's body was found on 7 May 1869. His body was buried in the South Rockhampton Cemetery on 8 May 1869.

After Halligan's body was finally discovered, several arrests were made in connection with the murder. George Palmer was arrested in the Gympie area. Following a magisterial inquiry, court appearances and their trials, 28-year-old Alexander Archibald, 40-year-old John "Old Jack" Williams and 22-year-old George Charles Frederick Palmer were all separately sentenced to death in October 1869.

Palmer and Williams were hanged at Rockhampton Gaol during a morning thunderstorm on 24 November 1869. Following an appeal in which Archibald claimed he had given evidence during his trial on the condition he would be pardoned, Archibald was hung at Rockhampton Gaol on 22 December 1869. The bodies of Archibald, Palmer and Williams were buried in the same cemetery as their victim following their executions. The three men became the second, third and fourth man to be executed in Rockhampton following the hanging of gold commissioner Thomas Griffin the previous year. Just as Griffin's case had done, the Halligan murder drew interest from the national press.

Since it occurred in 1869, the murder of Patrick Halligan and the execution of the three men found guilty of his murder has regularly been a topic of discussion in the press and in various history books.

In 1977, it was reported that two screenwriters had worked on a script for two years for a feature film called The Morinish Affair, based on Halligan's murder, with hopes the estimated budget of $250,000 could be funded by the Australian Film Commission, the Queensland Film Corporation and private investment.
