= Robert Butler (criminal) =

Robert Butler (c. 1851 – 17 July 1905), also known as James Wharton, was a New Zealand-Australian career criminal and murderer. He was born in either Kilkenny, County Kilkenny, Ireland or Bury, Lancashire, England on c. 1851. He was suspected of murdering a family of three in New Zealand in 1880, but was acquitted. However, Butler did receive an 18-year sentence on separate charges of arson and burglary. Butler was released from prison in 1896, after which he returned to Australia. He was executed for another murder in Queensland in 1905.

== See also ==
- List of serial killers by country
