= George Palmer (bushranger) =

Australian bushranger

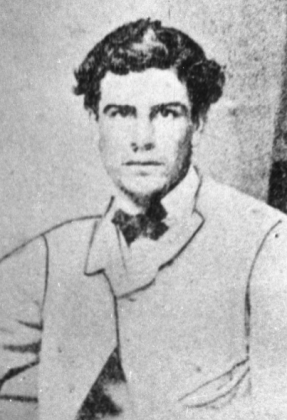
- Born: c. 1846; Queanbeyan, New South Wales, Australia
- Died: 24 November 1869; Rockhampton, Queensland, Australia
- Cause of death: Hanged
- Occupation: Bushranger
- Conviction: Murder

George Charles Frederick Palmer (c. 1846 – 24 November 1869) was an Australian bushranger who operated in Queensland.

== Biography ==
Palmer was born and raised in Queanbeyan, New South Wales. He was named after his grandfather, George Thomas Palmer, a squatter who was among the first British settlers in what is now Australian Capital Territory, and owner of Ginninderra Station.

Relocating to Queensland with his wife, Palmer developed a reputation as a "wild and reckless rogue", a crack rider, and horse thief. One evening, after stealing a horse, Palmer made a getaway to the Fitzroy River with two troopers in pursuit. He boarded a ferry, and in the darkness of the night, pretended to be a ferry employee as the troopers questioned the ferryman about the bushranger's whereabouts. The ferryman covered for Palmer, denying he had seen the bushranger. After the troopers left without suspicion, Palmer escaped in the opposite direction.

Throughout much of 1868, Palmer led a gang that bailed up coaches along roads leading out of Gympie, then experiencing a gold rush. In January 1869, he and gang member William Bond attempted to rob a Cobb & Co travelling along the newly opened Brisbane Road. One of the occupants, Bank of New South Wales manager Selwyn King, shot both bushrangers. The wounded Bond was arrested, but Palmer escaped to Rockhampton, where, in April 1869, he and several other bushrangers were involved in the murder of gold buyer Patrick Halligan.

The Queensland Government offered a reward of £200 for the capture of Palmer; the people of Rockhampton put up another £428. Meanwhile, he returned to Gympie, where his wife lived, and hid in a sandstone cave near Eel Creek. He was captured and arrested by police on 28 May 1868 and identified based on the bullet wound he received from Selwyn, on the corner of his elbow. He was taken to Rockhampton where, on 8 June, he confessed to shooting Halligan. In October, along with co-accused John Williams, Palmer was tried, convicted and sentenced to death by hanging. A large crowded gathered during a thunderstorm to witness the execution, which was carried out on 24 November. When asked if he had any last words, Palmer reportedly replied, "Nothing."

Stories of encounters with Palmer became legends in the Gympie region.
