= Ernest Austin (murderer) =

Australian murderer (1890–1913)

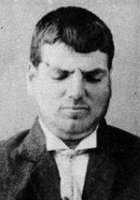
- Born: 1890; Victoria, Australia
- Died: 22 September 1913 (aged 22-23); Boggo Road Gaol, Brisbane, Queensland, Australia
- Cause of death: Execution by hanging
- Status: Executed
- Convictions: Wilful murder Assault with intent to commit rape Larceny (2 counts)
- Penalty: Death

Details
- Date: 8 June 1913
- Location: Yugar, Queensland
- Targets: Ivy Mitchell, 11

Ernest Austin (1890 – 22 September 1913) was an Australian criminal, notable for being the last person to receive capital punishment in Queensland.

== Murder of Ivy Mitchell ==
On 8 June 1913, 11-year-old Ivy Mitchell was found raped and murdered at Cedar Creek Road near Samford. Mitchell was the daughter of a farmer, who had been playing at the home of her friend, 7-year-old Mary Frisch, and at dusk Ivy left to go home. The Mitchell family lived 2 miles (3.2 km) away from the Frisch family, and the homes in the rural farming community around Samford were connected by dirt roads. Austin began to stalk the two girls as Frisch escorted Mitchell to the end of the Frisch's drive and said goodbye, and while Mitchell was walking home alone she disappeared. Mitchell's brother, James Mitchell Junior, became worried when his sister did not return home before sundown. With a hurricane lantern, he walked to the Frisch home where he was told she had already left hours before, and proceeded to rush home to tell his family Mitchell was missing. James Mitchell Senior, their father, headed out with his son to follow the footprints left behind in the dirt road by Mitchell from the end of the Frisch's drive. After a distance, unknown larger footprints joined Mitchell's small footprints, and in lantern light the Mitchell men followed them to the thick scrubland behind the local school, Parker State School (now within Yugar), where the grass had been crushed by something being dragged. Here they found Mitchell's corpse dumped in the scrub where she had been raped and her throat cut, along with hoof marks and part of a riding crop, indicating the perpetrator had escaped by horse.

The discovery of the body caused policemen to be dispatched by automobile from Samford, who began questioning locals. However, those that had seen Mitchell only saw her alone or with Frisch, but not with anyone else. A labourer, Alexander Gordon, was near the school at 5.30 pm where he had trespassed into a garden to pick a couple of fruits from an orange tree. Gordon recognised a local farmhand, Ernest Austin, thundering past on his horse as he was emerging from the garden with the oranges in hand. Austin spotted Gordon as he rode by, saying "Good night", and urging his horse along with a small tree branch. Earlier witnesses had seen Austin with a riding crop, however Gordon claimed he did not have one when he rode past. John Lofft, another local labourer, worked on a property with Austin and the pair shared living quarters. The night Mitchell was murdered, Austin had been in their room scraping at the sole of his boot with a knife, and had asked Lofft "Where are the pincers kept?", to which Lofft replied "In the blacksmith's shop." Austin then used the tool to remove the soles from his boots.

== Arrest and conviction ==
On 10 June, two days after the murder, Austin was arrested by the police. It was discovered that Austin had an established criminal history in Victoria, starting from as early as 11 years old when he had been caught thieving and sent to the Neglected Children's Department. In late 1909, Austin had been convicted as Ernest Johnson for an assault with intent to rape, receiving a sentence of three years imprisonment, which was served in Melbourne Gaol and Pentridge Prison. The crime had been frighteningly similar to the murder of Mitchell, as the victim, a 12-year-old girl, had been dragged into a shed by an axe-wielding Austin who fled when she had screamed too loudly.

The soles Austin had removed from his boots were later found and matched to footprints left near the body, and the same with the horseshoes from Austin's horse. Police determined that he had killed her before fleeing to the school's water tank where he had washed her blood from his hands and body (but also left more telltale footprints).

=== Execution ===
Austin was convicted of the rape and murder of Mitchell, and was executed by hanging in September at Boggo Road Gaol in Dutton Park, Brisbane, and buried in unconsecrated ground in South Brisbane Cemetery. Austin became the last convict to be executed at Boggo Road Gaol and the last in Queensland, when in 1922 it became the first state in Australia and the first government in the British Empire to abolish the death penalty. The ghost of Austin is said to haunt the Boggo Road Gaol, particularly at night during storms, although the cell block where he was held no longer exists and he was never in the block claimed to be haunted by him.
