= Boggo Road Gaol =

Prison in Brisbane, Australia

Coordinates: 27.49512°S 153.02842°E

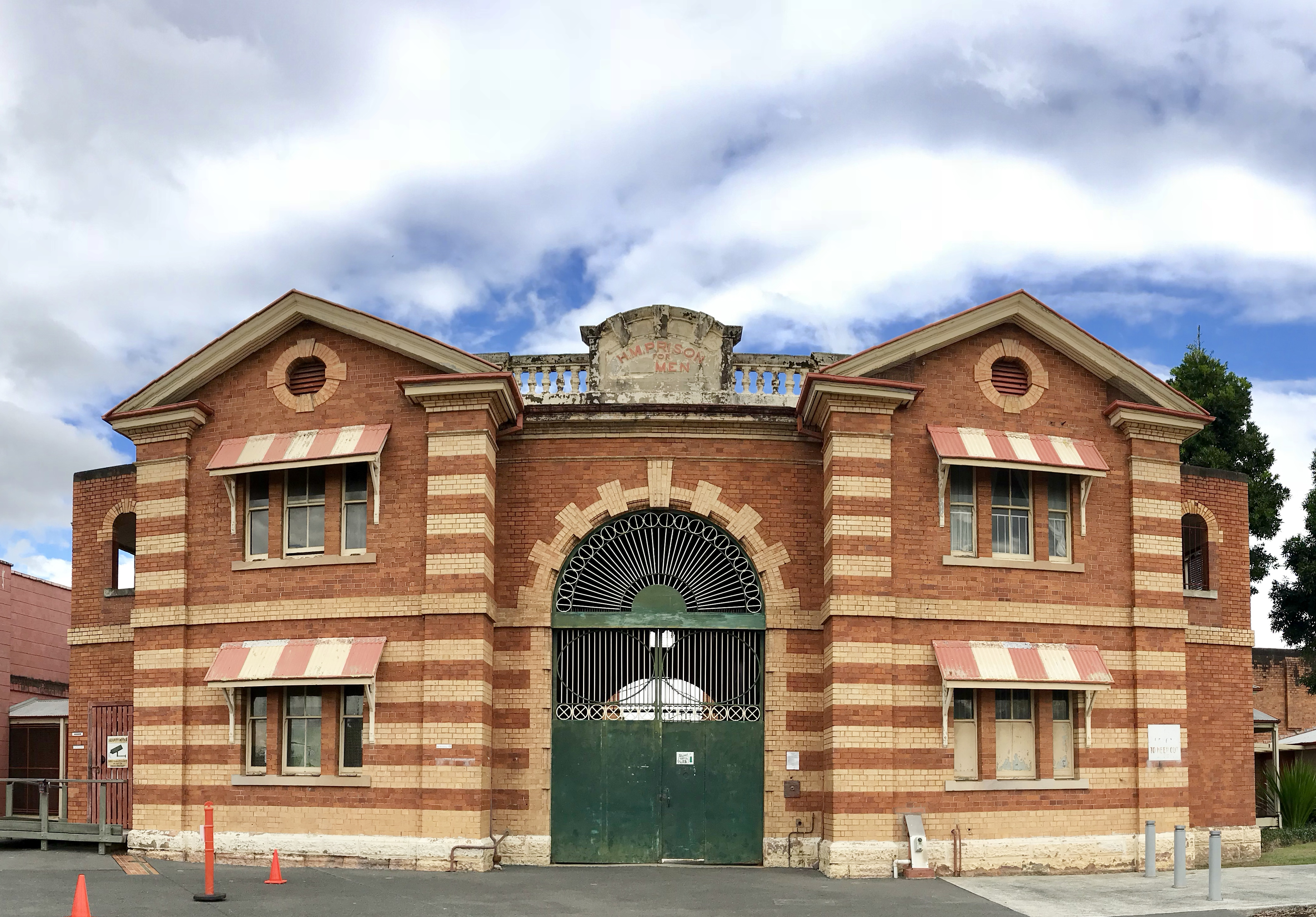
- Boggo Road Gaol entrance
- Interactive map of Boggo Road Gaol
- Location: Dutton Park, Queensland, Australia
- Security class: Maximum Security
- Opened: July 1883
- Closed: November 1989
- Managed by: At first prisons fell under the control of the Sheriff until the 1890s. The Prisons Department (later the Department of Correctional Services), ran the site until closure. As a historical site the prison was run by different government departments, including State Development and Public Works.

H.M. Prison Brisbane, commonly known as Boggo Road Gaol, was Queensland's main prison from the 1880s to the 1980s. By the time it closed, it had become notorious for poor conditions and rioting. Located on Annerley Road in Dutton Park, an inner southern suburb of Brisbane, it is the only surviving intact jail in Queensland that reflects penological principles of the 19th century. After closing in 1992, the larger 1960s section was demolished, leaving the heritage listed section (built as a women's prison in 1903).

It was officially known as "Brisbane Gaol" but was commonly known as "Boggo Road" after the original name of the Annerley Road. A new street formed after 1996 now has the name Boggo Road.

== History ==
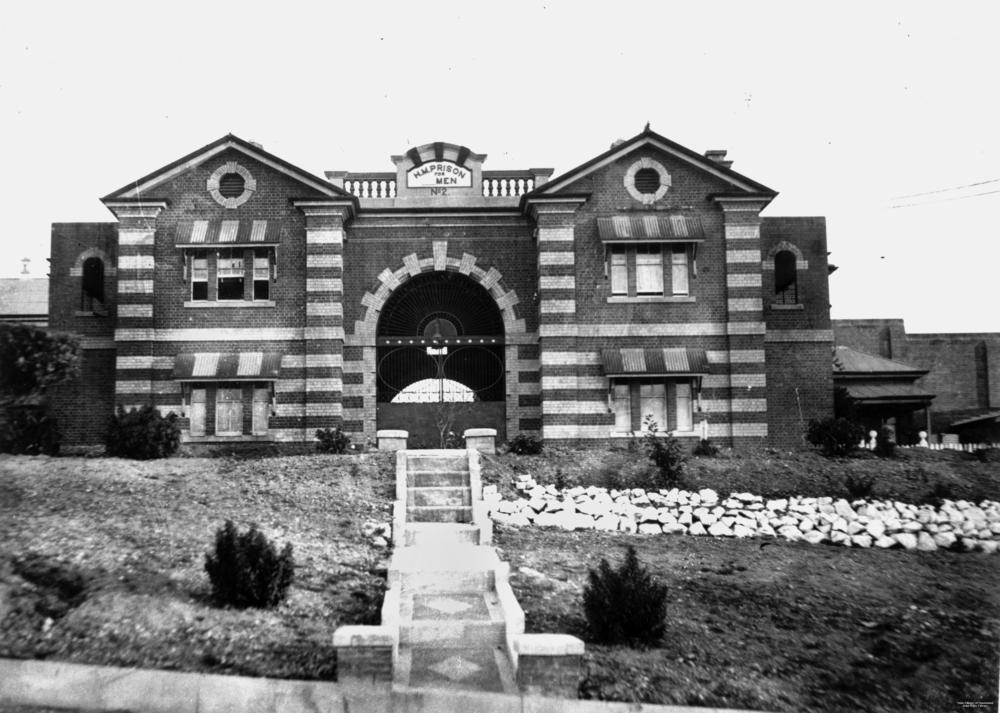
Entrance to the jail, c. 1936

In the 1850s, the district where the jail was subsequently located was known unofficially as "Boggo" or "Boggo Scrub", and by the late 1850s the track through the area was known as Boggo Road.

It has been suggested that the name came about because the area was very boggy in wet weather. Another theory is that Boggo (or "Bloggo" or "Bolgo") was a corruption of an Aboriginal word meaning 'two leaning trees', and that the road was named after two prominent trees at either One-Mile Swamp or what is now Wilkins Street, off Annerley Road. Another possibility is that Boggo Road was an unofficial and unmaintained short-cut between Ipswich Road and Stanley Street that became very boggy after rain. Boggo Road was officially renamed Annerley Road in 1903, but the colloquial name for the jail that had long been in use stayed.

In 1863, land off Boggo Road was set aside as a government reserve, finally proclaimed a jail reserve in 1880. The first cellblock opened on 2 July 1883, built by Robert Porter, contained 57 cells and was constructed using materials from the demolished Petrie Terrace Jail. This cellblock (later known as "No. 1 Division") was the scene of 42 hangings, including the hanging of Ernest Austin in 1913—the last execution in Queensland.

In 1903, a new prison was built to hold female prisoners; in 1921, when the women were transferred to a timber dormitory, this prison building was converted to the "No. 2 Division" for men. The structure is now the only section still standing and is listed on the Queensland State Heritage Register.

A new prison was built around the perimeter of No. 1 prison during the 1960s and No. 1 prison was demolished, leaving area for an oval and recreational facilities for the newly built prison, which had running cold water and toilet facilities in all cells. Under the oval was the facility that became known as the "black hole" where prisoners were subjected to "punishment". The "black hole" continued in use until the late 1980s. A new women's jail was also built at this time. The jail was originally designed to cater for 40 male prisoners serving as a holding place for prisoners heading to St Helena Island in Moreton Bay. However, by 1989 there were 187 male prisoners and the women's facility had around 200 additional prisoners.

Protests at the jail during the 1970s saw inmates undertake hunger strikes, roof-top protests, and rioting over the poor conditions and treatment. The prison was constantly in the headlines and became notorious around Australia. Cells in the No. 2 prison did not have any form of sanitation, and facilities for washing were lacking. Prisoners were required to use a bucket through the evening for toilet breaks and empty it, or "slop out", in the morning. A Queensland Government inquiry into the living conditions of State prisons found Boggo Road to be outdated and inadequate for prisoners' needs. No. 2 Division was closed in 1989. No. 1 division was closed in 1992 and was demolished in 1996 (a small section of what was "C5" and guard tower still remain). The women's prison operated until 2000 and was demolished in 2006.

In 1992, after its closure as a prison facility, the No. 2 Division became home to the Boggo Road Gaol Museum, which featured displays of prison-related artefacts. Throughout the 1990s, ex-officers conducted guided tours of the site; from 2003, the museum and tours were operated by the Boggo Road Gaol Historical Society, a non-profit incorporated association of volunteers.

In 1993, Boggo Road Gaol hosted the concert "Jailhouse Rock", which included bands such as Divinyls, Rose Tattoo, Billy Thorpe and the Aztecs, Spy Vs Spy and Powderfinger.

Temporary closure of the Boggo Road Gaol historical site occurred from late-2005 to December 2012 during the 2006-2010 redevelopment of the surrounding site into the Boggo Road Urban Village and the construction of the southeast busway.

In December 2012, Boggo Road Gaol reopened to the public as a tourist attraction with guided tours being conducted by Boggo Road Gaol Pty. Like many other similar places around the country, the site also hosted guided ghost tours.

A second temporary closure, pausing all tours and activities, began in March 2022 and is ongoing while further surrounding development takes place, including Cross River Rail and the construction of a new shopping village. A reopening date is yet to be announced.

== Heritage listing ==
The No. 2 Division and the remnants of No. 1 Division were listed on the Queensland Heritage Register in 1993.

== Notable prisoners ==
- Hon. Gordon Brown – a former President of the Australian Senate
- James Finch and Andrew Stuart – the "Whiskey Au-Go-Go" murderers
- Nathan Jones – actor and professional wrestler
- Debbie Kilroy – prisoner rights activist, founder of Sisters Inside
- Patrick Kenniff – also known as Queensland's last bushranger
- Michael Peterson – Australian surfing legend
- Pluto (William Davis) – an Aboriginal Australian miner convicted of burglary
- Wayne Michael Ryan – convicted multiple bank robber who escaped Boggo Road Gaol twice (1988 and 1989)
- Ellen Thompson – the only woman hanged in Queensland

=== Executions ===
42 prisoners were hanged at the Gaol.

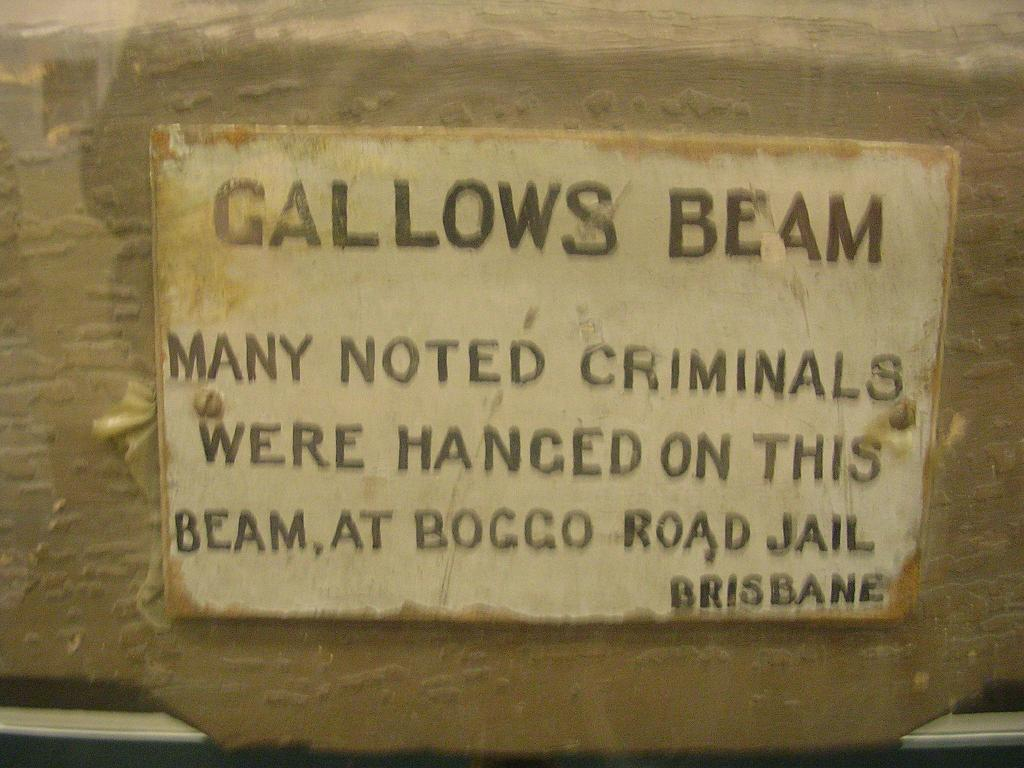
Plaque on gallows beam used at Boggo Road Gaol

Name	Year of birth	Year of death	Place of origin	Victims
James Gardiner	1864	1883	Scotland	Murder of Ada Gardiner at Rockhampton
Jango	c.1866	1883	Australia (Aboriginal)	Murder of Mrs Eliza Mills at Dingo
George	1858	1883	Australia (Aboriginal)	Rape of a young girl at Rockhampton
Walter Edward Gordon	1857	1885	England	Murder of Walter Bunning on Darr River Downs station
Tim Tie	1856	1886	China	Murder of Jimmy Ah Fook near Dulbydilla
Wong Tong	1857	1886	China	Murder of Cock Tow at the Seaview Plantation, Bundaberg
Christopher Pickford	1856	1887	United States	Murder of Martin Emmerson at Ravenswood
Ellen Thompson	1846	1887	Ireland	Murder of her husband William Thompson near Port Douglas
John Harrison	1860	1887	England	Murder of William Thompson near Port Douglas
Edmond Duhamel	1851	1888	France	Murder of Sarah Descury at Rockhampton
Sedin	1864	1888	Java	Murders of John Fitzgerald, Christian Mariager, and J. P. Davis at Normanton
Donald	c.1863	1892	Australia (Aboriginal)	Rape of a married white woman
Francis Charles Horrocks	1875	1892	Queensland	Murder of Rudolph Weissmuller at Mooraree
George Gleeson	1865	1892	India	Murder of Patrick McKiernan at Prince of Wales Island
Leonard William Moncado	1850	1892	Chile	Murder of Bob, an Aboriginal boy aboard the barque "Sketty Belle"
George Thomas Blantern	1858	1893	England	Murder of Flora McDonald at Marlborough
Hatsuro Abe	1863	1894	Japan	Murder of a Japanese woman named Omatzie at Thursday Island
Mi-Orie	1866	1895	Malaita Island	Murder of Francis Macartney near Bundaberg
Narasemai	1862	1895	Malaita Island	Murder of Francis Macartney near Bundaberg
Sayer (Safhour)	1870	1895	Malaita Island	Murder of Peter Anderson at Etowrie, near Mackay
Jacky	1864	1895	Australia (Aboriginal)	Murder of Jacky Williams at Mount Morgan
Frank Tinyana	1858	1895	Filipino	Murder of Senior Constable William Conroy at Thursday Island
Willie Broom	1870	1900	Australia (Aboriginal)	Murder of thirteen-year-old Mary Le Blowitz at Stanton Harcourt, near Bundaberg
Charles Beckman	1859	1901	Germany	Murder of Alfred Anderson at McCartney's Creek, near Bowen
Wandee	1881	1901	South Sea Islands	Murder of Alfred Burnstead at Ayr
John Rheuben	1846	1901	Portugal	Murder of Fanny Hardwick at Rockhampton
Orifough	1879	1901	South Sea Islands	Murder of Morris Summers at Ashburton, near Mackay
David Alexander Brown	1846	1901	USA	Murder of Graham Haygrath at Charters Towers
Patrick Kenniff	1865	1903	NSW	Murder of Police Constable George Doyle at Lethbridge's Pocket near Carnarvon
Sow Too Low	1875	1903	Malaita Island	Murders of Sergeant David Johnson, John Martin and Alice Gunning in the Mackay area
Gosano	1870	1905	South Sea Islands	Murder of Jack Parsons at Ingham
James Warton	1845	1905	Ireland	Murder of William Munday at Toowong
Johannes	1867	1906	Ceylon (Sri Lanka)	Murder of Police Constable Albert G. Price at Mackay
Twadiga	1876	1906	Solomon Islands	Murder of William Baulch at Mackay
Look Kow	1844	1906	China	Murder of Lee Choy Yuen at Townsville
August Millewski	1855	1907	Germany	Murder of Wallum Nabby at Nanango
Bismarck	1886	1909	Australia (Aboriginal)	Murder of Mrs Janet Evitts at Jundah
Arthur Ross	1888	1909	England	Murder of James Muir (Bank Clerk) at Gayndah
Alexander Bradshaw	1882	1910	Queensland	Murder of George Sutherland at Carron River (The charge of murder of Sutherland's wife Alice was then not proceeded with)
George David Silva	1884	1912	Queensland/Ceylon	Murdered six members of the Ching family at Alligator Creek
Charles Deen	1865	1913	Ceylon	Murder of Peter Dina (or Dinah) at Innisfail
Ernest Austin	1890	1913	Victoria	Rape and murder of 11-year-old Ivy Mitchell at Cedar Creek Rd, Samford

== Popular culture ==
Boggo Road is mentioned in the Australian soap opera Prisoner as the prison where Joan Ferguson worked prior to coming to Melbourne. It was also visited in the season final of The Amazing Race Australia 2. Boggo Road is also the setting for the second episode of the sixth season of the American reality show The Mole. Australian rock band, The Chats also reference a 1989 riot at Boggo Road in the song "Boggo Breakout", within the album Get Fucked, released in 2022. Eli Bell, the protagonist of the novel and Netflix series Boy Swallows Universe breaks into the prison to visit his mother Frankie on Christmas Day. Eli and his brother Gus' babysitter Slim Halliday was notorious for his escape attempts from the prison, one of which Eli replicated, but was unsuccessful.

== See also ==
- Boggo Road Busway
- List of Australian prisons
