= Thomas Griffin (Australian gold commissioner) =

Policeman, gold commissioner and murderer (1832–1868)

Thomas John Griffin
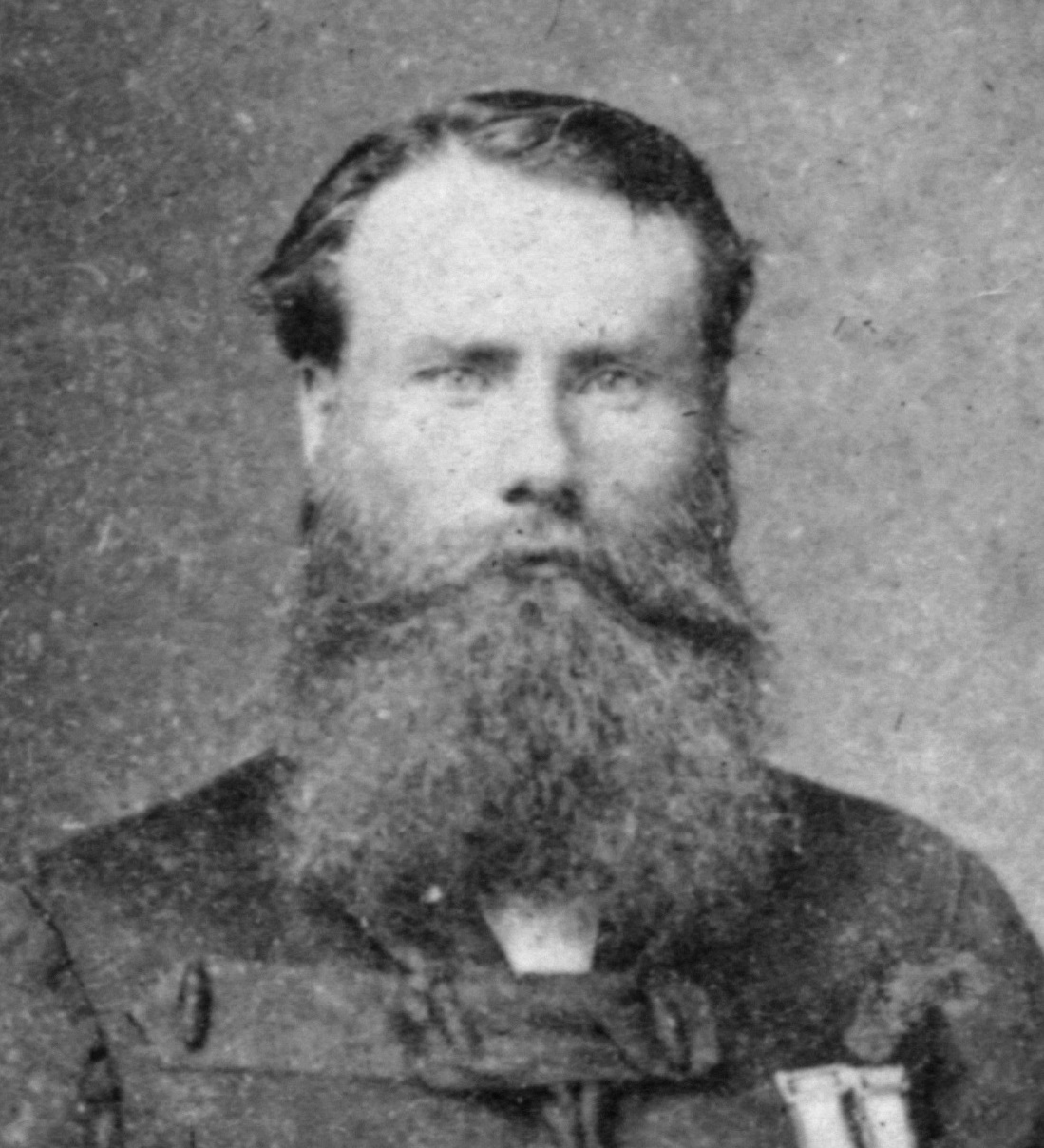
- Portrait of Thomas John Griffin in about 1863 (detail from a larger photograph).
- Born: Thomas John Griffin; 27 July 1832; Ireland ^{[A]}
- Died: 1 June 1868 (aged 35); Rockhampton, Queensland, Australia
- Cause of death: Execution by hanging
- Status: Executed
- Conviction: Wilful murder
- Penalty: Death

Details
- Victims: Patrick William Cahill; John Francis Power
- Country: Australia
- State: Queensland

Thomas John Griffin (27 July 1832 – 1 June 1868) was a senior Queensland police officer who was executed in June 1868, after being found guilty of the double murder of two police officers, troopers John Power and Patrick Cahill, who were on duty and under Griffin's protection and authority. Less than a month before he carried out his crimes, Griffin had been police magistrate and gold commissioner at Clermont in Central Queensland.

In early October 1867 Griffin was transferred to the position of Assistant Gold Commissioner at Rockhampton. The murders were committed on 30 October 1867 on the banks of the Mackenzie River while Griffin and the two troopers were escorting a transfer of money from Rockhampton to Clermont. Griffin murdered the troopers to cover-up his theft of the escort money, which he hid near Rockhampton prior to the discovery of the bodies of his victims. He was tried for the murders, found guilty and sentenced to hang, though he maintained his innocence throughout the process. In the final weeks before his execution, Griffin attempted to negotiate an escape by revealing the location of the stolen money to one of his gaolers, in the process admitting his involvement in the deaths of Power and Cahill. Griffin was executed on 1 June 1868, the first hanging carried out at Rockhampton Gaol.

In a notorious case of grave robbery, less than a week after he was executed Griffin's grave-site was excavated during the night, his coffin was opened and his head stolen. The perpetrators were not publicly revealed until the early decades of the twentieth century, when it was disclosed that Griffin's skull had been kept for many years in the surgery of a prominent Rockhampton medical practitioner.

== Biography ==
=== Early life ===
Thomas John Griffin was born on 27 July 1832 in Ireland, the son of John Loftus Griffin and Anne (née Thompson). His birthplace has been variously recorded as Banbridge in County Down, County Antrim and County Sligo.^{[A]} Griffin's father was a County Inspector of Police. Another version of Griffin's origins states that he was "the illegitimate son of an English officer" in Dublin and his mother was "a lady's maid, or some superior servant", and that he received his early education at a Dublin model school.

As a young man Griffin was described as "wild and flighty", considered to be "good-natured, but exceedingly vain, boastful, and given to 'white lies'". After his father's death the family suffered from reduced circumstances, "in consequence of a lawsuit between the family and an uncle of his". In about 1849, when he was aged seventeen or eighteen, Griffin joined the Royal Irish Constabulary and was placed as a clerk in the Commandant's office in Dublin.

After the outbreak of the Crimean War in late 1853 Griffin volunteered for service in the British Army, being assigned initially as an assistant storekeeper in the commissariat department. In 1855 he joined the Turkish Contingent, holding a commission as a cornet. The Turkish Contingent, also known as the Anglo-Turkish Contingent, was a detachment of Turkish Army infantry, artillery and cavalry regiments placed under the command of commissioned British officers. Griffin later advanced to the rank of adjutant and by the end of his service was awarded two Turkish and Crimean medals.

=== Immigration and marriage ===
When his service in Crimea was finished, Griffin accepted an offer of free travel to Australia, made available to police volunteers who had served in the war. Griffin departed from Liverpool in early December 1856 aboard the clipper ship, Champion of the Seas, arriving in Melbourne in early March 1857. During the voyage to Australia Griffin became acquainted with Harriett Klisser, a widow aged 42 years. Mrs. Klisser was travelling with her two adult sons, William and George Jarratt, and William's wife. Harriett Klisser (née Farrow) was born in 1814 in county Sussex. She had been married three times prior to meeting Griffin, with the two sons who accompanied her to Australia from her first marriage. Her third marriage was to Mark Klisser.^{[B]} Mrs. Klisser was described as a wealthy widow, possessing resources of "several hundred pounds".

Thomas John Griffin and Harriett Klisser were married on 29 April 1857 in the Melbourne suburb of Essendon. After they were married they went into business together, but Griffin "soon squandered nearly all her little hoard".^{[C]} The couple argued "and a separation was the consequence, the woman giving the man who ruined her half of what money was left". According to social and legal conventions of the time, "marriage virtually turned legal control of a woman's property permanently over to her husband". English law held that when a woman was married, she became, in a sense, her husband's property. This common law doctrine was known as coverture, and allowed a married woman's legal identity to be subsumed in her husband's. The presumption of coverture was maintained on the condition that the man continued to provide for the sustenance of the woman.

Griffin deserted his wife and went to Tasmania "and got persons there to circulate reports of his own death" in an effort to circumvent the requirement to maintain support of his wife.

=== Early police career ===
In Sydney in May 1858 Griffin joined the New South Wales police. He was initially taken into the constabulary office as a clerk.

From late-July 1858 newspaper reports began to be published regarding the discovery of a "rich gold-field" on the Fitzroy River near Canoona, 31 miles (50 km) north-west of Rockhampton (at that time within the Northern District of New South Wales). In late 1858 Griffin was appointed to Rockhampton as an Acting Sergeant. In February 1859 he was appointed Chief Constable at Rockhampton, with the additional responsibilities of Inspector of Slaughter Houses, Inspector of Weights and Measures and Bailiff of the Court of Requests. In March 1859 Griffin was appointed as the Inspector of Distilleries for the District of Rockhampton. In December 1859 the Letters Patent formally proclaiming the separation of the colony of Queensland from New South Wales were published. By this process the employment of all colonial officers, both civil and military, within the territory of the colony of Queensland, were transferred to the new colony.

In November 1860 Griffin was transferred as Chief Constable from Rockhampton to Brisbane. In February 1861 he was appointed to the additional role of Ranger of Crown Lands for the police district of Brisbane. In February 1862 Griffin was appointed Acting Clerk of Petty Sessions in Brisbane and on in January 1863 he was formally appointed to the position.

In Brisbane Griffin made efforts "to ingratiate himself with people of position and authority". He gained prominence in Brisbane society and became "a regular attendant at Government House festivities". Throughout this period Griffin consistently represented himself as a single man. The historian and journalist John Bird, in his history of Rockhampton published in 1904, states that in Brisbane Griffin "paid great attention to a young society lady, sister of a man who held a high position in the Ministry". Bird asserts that the minister assisted in advancing Griffin's career after Griffin alluded to a desire to marry the minister's sister, but professed a belief that he was unable to marry until he was working in a higher-paying position.

=== Appointment to Clermont ===
In October 1863 Griffin was appointed as the Police Magistrate for the district of Peak Downs, with the additional role of Commissioner for the Peak Downs gold-fields, as well as Inspector of Police and Commissioner of Crown Lands. The discovery of gold in the Peak Downs region, inland from Rockhampton, had begun to be reported in the colonial press in November 1861. By 1863 the gold-fields "held a considerable population". The township of Clermont had been established on low-lying ground adjoining a large billabong near the confluence of Sandy and Wolfang creeks, with another township named Copperfield located nearby.

The local magistrate and landholder, Oscar de Satgé, described Griffin as an energetic man who, soon after his arrival, "arrogated to himself a good deal more than even the full powers of his various appointments". Griffin was assisted in his official duties by the Clerk of Petty Sessions, William Cave, who de Satgé described as "a plodding but timid officer... who could do little to check Griffin's overbearing will".

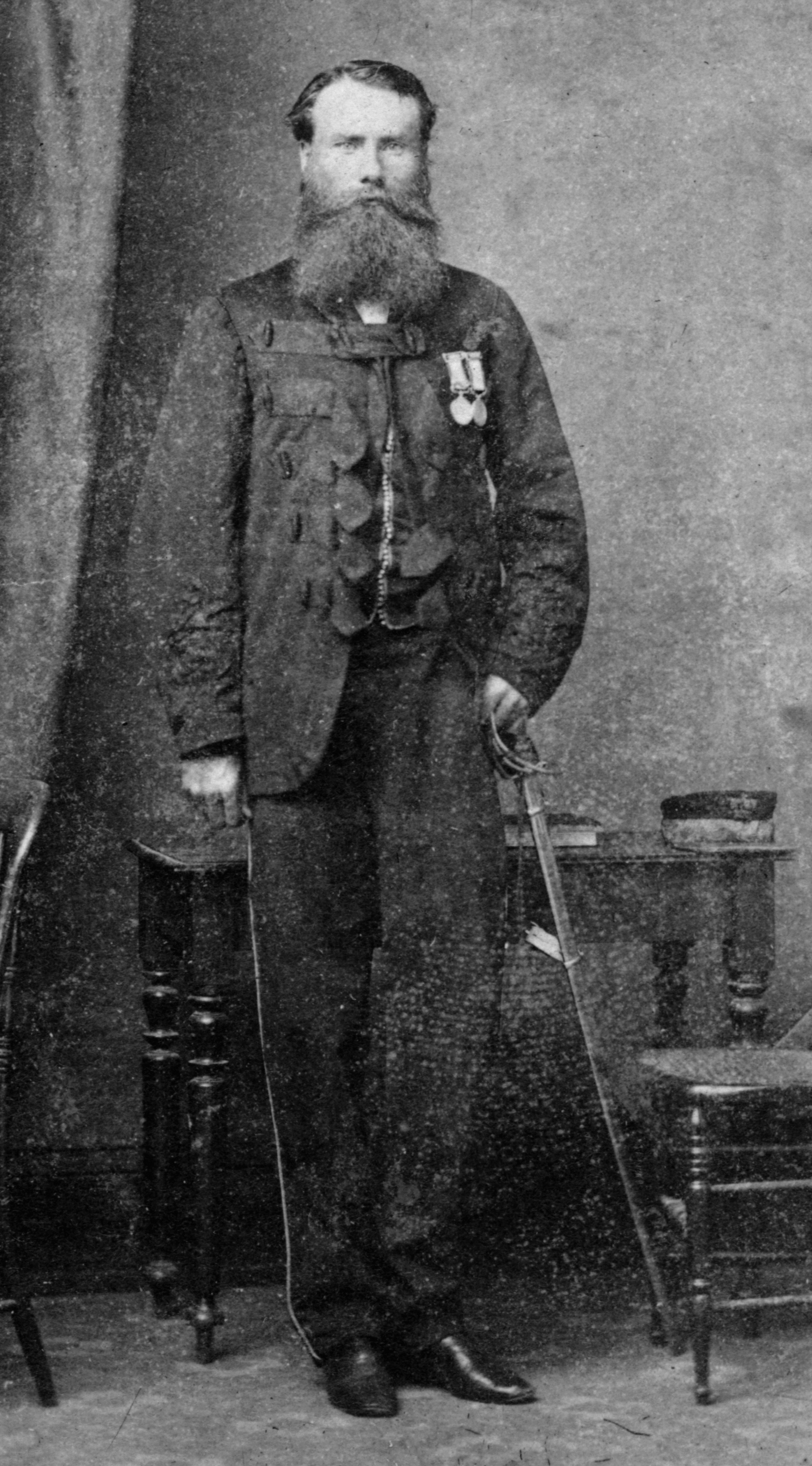
Thomas John Griffin, photographed in about 1863.

During his four years' residence at Clermont Griffin became widely known in the district. In general he had a "very suave and attractive manner", though aspects of his character tended to have a polarising effect. To those he considered to be socially inferior, Griffin tended to be overbearing "and was by no means well liked". To his friends "he was usually courteous to a degree, but at times he was somewhat brusque". The historian and journalist John Bird rated "ostentation and vanity, with a fondness for display" as the dominant traits of Griffin's character. During his tenure at Clermont Griffin was also known to be a gambler. He was a frequent visitor "to a house in Clermont where heavy gambling was carried on in a room isolated from other parts of the house".

During Griffin's tenure as Gold Commissioner and Police Magistrate at Clermont, his wife in Melbourne discovered that her husband was alive. Without support Harriet Griffin had been having a difficult time. In September 1864 she had been listed as a "new insolvent", citing "want of employment for herself or family, and pressure of a judgement creditor". Her liabilities were recorded as £28.13s.5d, against her assets which were valued at one pound. Harriett was living at Emerald Hill at that time and was recorded as a widow. At some stage after that, Harriett saw a newspaper article mentioning the name Thomas John Griffin, Gold Commissioner at Clermont in Queensland. She was struck by the similarity in names with that of her supposedly late husband, and her suspicions were aroused. Harriett Griffin consulted a lawyer who ascertained that no-one of her husband's name had died at the time and place that had been represented to her. A letter was subsequently sent to Griffin in Clermont, with the result that he was "compelled to make his wife a substantial quarterly allowance to keep her tongue still".

Even though Clermont was located about 240 miles (390 km) inland from Rockhampton. Griffin often travelled to the larger, more established township on personal business. Griffin continued to represent himself as a single man, to the extent of forming an intimacy with twenty-two year-old Elizabeth Ottley, the daughter of Mrs. Elizabeth Ottley, a widow living at Rocklands on the outskirts of Rockhampton.^{[D]} Griffin's relationship with the young woman developed to such an extent that the two became engaged to be married. Mrs. Ottley and her two young adult children were recent immigrants from England, having arrived at Rockhampton in May 1865. Griffin's frequent absences in Rockhampton "threw a good deal of work and responsibility" on the local Bench of Magistrates. In about April 1866, in his role as senior magistrate at Clermont, Oscar de Satgé wrote to the Colonial Secretary in Brisbane complaining about Griffin's conduct, accusing him of blatant abuses of duty and requesting an inquiry into his behaviour. De Satgé detailed a number of issues including interference with the local Bench, the misuse of troopers' time and Griffin's interception of a letter, critical of him, that had been addressed to de Satgé. An inquiry was held in Brisbane by an under-secretary of the Civil Service, but "owing to sickness and other causes" a number of witnesses were unable to attend. Griffin was acquitted of blame due to "want of evidence". After the exoneration de Satgé claimed Griffin "acted more independently than ever". His absences at Rockhampton became more frequent and it was rumoured he "was getting into debt".

In August 1866 Griffin was appointed as the Returning Officer for the Electoral District of Clermont after the resignation from that position of Oscar de Satgé.

In July 1867 unsuccessful litigants in a court case at Clermont complained about the conduct of the Police Magistrate, Thomas Griffin, in response to which District Court Judge Innes recommended that they "memorialise the Government" for Griffin's removal. In the Queensland Government Gazette of 3 August 1867 details were published of a series of planned transfers of Police Magistrate positions, including the transfer of Griffin from Clermont to Toowoomba. At about that time, however, local agitation had begun to build for Griffin's removal from Clermont, the leading advocates for which were the local medical practitioner, Dr. Spiridion Candiottis, and S. W. Jacobson, a Copperfield storekeeper and postmaster of that township. In September 1867 Jacobson met with Charles Buzacott, the co-owner and editor of the Clermont newspaper, the Peak Downs Telegram, seeking his advice. Jacobson informed Buzacott that the conduct of the Police Magistrate "had become intolerable" and that "a number of sufferers (including himself) were determined upon bringing about his removal". The postmaster asked Buzacott about the best method of proceeding with that objective, to which the editor advised sending "a temperately worded memorial to the Government". Shortly afterwards Jacobson and Dr. Candiottis met with Buzacott in his office, where a requisition was drafted addressed to the Clermont mayor, John Winter, requesting that he convene a public meeting "to consider the desirability or otherwise of memorialising the Government in favour of the removal of the Police Magistrate". The mayor subsequently agreed to the meeting and a notification was published in the Peak Downs Telegram. A day or two later it became known that Griffin was to be transferred from Clermont, but Dr. Candiottis decided to go ahead with the meeting in case the report of Griffin's transfer was untrue.

The public meeting was chaired by the mayor of Clermont. During the meeting Dr. Candiottis, who at one time had been a friend of Griffin, "spoke in scathing terms" of the Police Magistrate and attributed his appointment to Clermont as the action of "an unscrupulous minister". Two resolutions were proposed, both of which were eventually carried. The first resolution stated: "That it is desirable for the welfare of the community that Thomas John Griffin should be removed from his position as Police Magistrate in consequence of the inefficient and unsatisfactory discharge of his magisterial duties". The second resolution declared that Griffin was "despotic, arbitrary and partial" and that he had "lost the confidence of the public". After the meeting a petition with twenty signatures was forwarded to the Colonial Secretary calling for Griffin's removal from Clermont. Despite these efforts, however, the report of Griffin's imminent departure from Clermont proved to be correct. He was to be transferred to Rockhampton as Assistant Gold Commissioner under the Gold Commissioner, John Jardine.

A farewell dinner, on the occasion of Griffin's departure to Rockhampton, was held on 4 October 1867 in the new billiard room of the Leichhardt Hotel in Clermont. The evening was attended by "thirty-five gentlemen representing the squatting, mining, and commercial interests of Peak Downs". At the conclusion of the meal, toasts and speeches were made. The chairman of the proceedings and Mayor of Clermont, John Winter, in a brief speech remarked that "all must be aware of the many good acts Mr. Griffin had done during his long residence in the district". During his speech in response Griffin expressed his appreciation of "the way in which his name had been received this evening", which he regarded as proof that those present "did not endorse the calumnies which had been recently uttered against him". Several of the subsequent speakers "referred to the late contemptible attack upon Mr. Griffin, and pointed out that many of the statements made by Dr. Candiottis were absolutely false, and others were perversions of the truth".

=== The gold escort ===
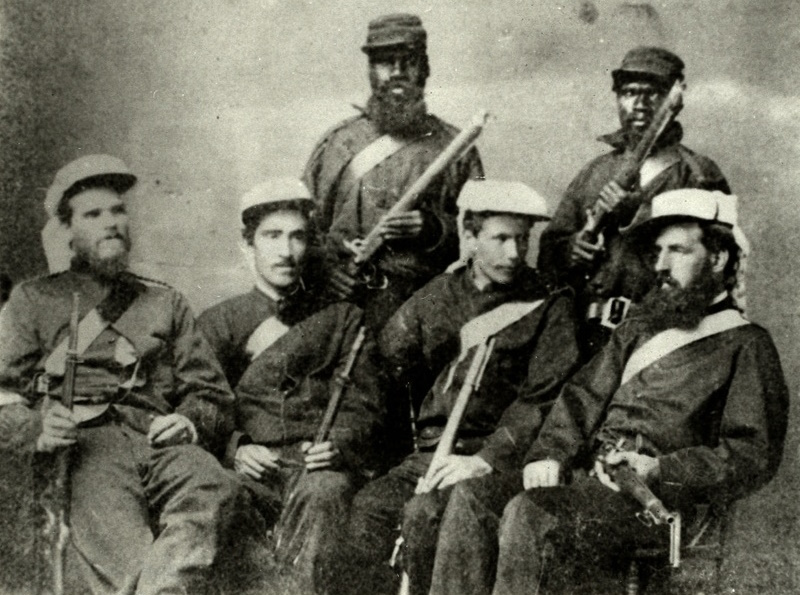
The Clermont gold escort (seated l. to r.) Sergeant James Julian, Constable Patrick William Cahill, Constable John Francis Power and Gold Commissioner Thomas John Griffin (the two standing Native Mounted Policemen are not named).

On the eve of Griffin's departure from Clermont a gold escort, consisting of Sergeant James Julian and two troopers, left Clermont for Rockhampton with 2,806 ounces of gold. Gold escorts operated between goldfields settlements and major towns, where gold was transported to a banking institution by authorised police officers and exchanged for cash, which was then escorted back to bank branches, on or nearby to the goldfields. The Clermont escort arrived at their destination on 17 October 1867. Griffin had left Clermont soon after the gold escort and arrived at Rockhampton two days later, on 19 October.

After his arrival in Rockhampton Griffin was informed that a group of six Chinese miners had been making enquiries about money and gold they had given to Griffin five months previously, to be sent by escort from Clermont to Rockhampton, of which Griffin had provided "no satisfactory account". When the Chinese learned that Griffin was in Rockhampton "they constantly worried him" about the matter.

Soon after arriving in Rockhampton, Griffin told Sergeant Julian he intended sending him back with cash to be deposited in the Clermont branch of the Australian Joint Stock Bank (A.J.S. Bank). Griffin's actions in this regard was "purely on his own initiative, and without authoritative warrant". On 25 October Julian received an order from Griffin to get money from the Rockhampton branch of the A.J.S. Bank. The following morning, Saturday 26 October, Sergeant Julian and Trooper Patrick Cahill went to the bank and collected cash in ten canvas bags, consisting of four packages (each containing one thousand £1 notes), two bundles of £5 notes (amounting to £4,000) and £151 in gold, silver and copper coins, making a total of £8,151. Julian and Cahill then parted, arranging to meet up that afternoon at the Railway Hotel. Julian waited at the hotel past the pre-arranged time, but as Cahill failed to appear, he returned the money to the bank and rode out to the escort camp near a lagoon at Rocklands, about four miles south of Rockhampton, where he reported Cahill's absence to Griffin. The camp used by the gold escort was located about 400 yards from the residence of Mrs. Ottley, whose daughter was reputed to be engaged to Griffin.

The following morning, Sunday 27 October, Griffin instructed Julian to go to the bank and retrieve the ten canvas bags. Julian and Cahill (who had since returned to the camp) followed Griffin's instructions; after they returned with the money, Griffin told them to be ready to start for Clermont that afternoon, telling them that he would accompany them on the initial stage of the journey and camp for one night. Griffin, Julian and Cahill made a start at four o'clock in the afternoon and travelled as far as Stanwell, where they camped off the road. Julian laid the canvas bags on the ground under his blankets and slept upon them. At three o'clock in the morning Cahill was sent to look for the horses. To Julian, Griffin's behaviour during Cahill's absence seemed odd; he "seemed uneasy" and appeared to be watching Julian. When Cahill returned, he and Julian began preparing the horses for the road. Griffin then decided that the horses needed to be re-shod. He told them that he and Cahill would return to Rockhampton to have the shoeing done while Julian was to remain at the camp-site with the money until Griffin sent Trooper Power out to him. Julian took issue with that suggestion, not wishing to remain alone with so much cash. He offered as an alternative to wait at a nearby pastoral station, but "this did not suit Griffin" and so all three then returned to the camp at Rocklands.

Troopers Power and Gildea were at the Rocklands camp when they arrived. Power and Cahill were directed to take the horses to Rockhampton to be re-shod and Griffin went across to Mrs. Ottley's residence, leaving Julian and Gildea at the camp. He returned during the afternoon and directed Gildea to go to Rockhampton to collect letters. While Gildea was preparing to depart, Griffin returned to Mrs. Ottley's. Julian, "not liking the look of things", told Gildea to remain in camp until he had spoken to Griffin again. Sergeant Julian then went across to Mrs. Ottley's to see Griffin, and once again protested at being left alone with so much money. Griffin, in a state of "high dudgeon", returned to the camp with Julian, and Gildea then went to collect the letters. By this time Griffin's behaviour had aroused Julian's suspicions and he remained on the alert. Later that afternoon the three troopers returned to the camp from Rockhampton and during the night Julian once again kept careful guard over the money-bags.

At daylight on Tuesday, 29 October, Griffin instructed the men to be ready for a start after breakfast and then left for Mrs. Ottley's place. At the camp during breakfast, the tea was found to have "a queer bitter taste". Julian said to the others that there was plenty of milk to drink, and took the billy and poured the tea onto the ground. As he did, he discovered "a white powder at the bottom of the billy". He did not mention this to his companions at the time, with the incident only becoming meaningful in retrospect. When Griffin returned, the party and their packhorses made another start. Griffin told them that instead of going by the road they would cut across about five miles through some "swampy, scrubby country". Griffin led the way, "but kept looking back at the troopers as if he expected something to happen". As they were approaching the small community of Gracemere, Griffin stopped their progress and told them he had left a small parcel of gold behind at the Club-house in Rockhampton, which had come down by the last escort from Clermont by mistake. He ordered Julian and the troopers back to the Rocklands camp, and then rode off to Rockhampton. Instead of following instructions, Julian took the men and horses into town and once again returned the money to the bank.

In Rockhampton Griffin saw Julian and the troopers returning from depositing the money at the bank and demanded an explanation, to which Sergeant Julian replied that he had returned the money for safe-keeping. Griffin was furious and suspended Julian on the spot. Julian surrendered his revolver and rifle to Power, whom Griffin had appointed in Julian's place. Griffin then went to see the bank manager, Thomas Hall, and told him he had suspended Julian, claiming he "had been acting in a very strange manner" and "evidently did not want to go to Clermont". Hall said that, as Trooper Power was "new to the responsibility" he would only release half the money. Later that day Griffin told the six Chinese men, through an intermediary, to meet him at the Club-house on the following day, when they would receive their money. Power took charge of £4,000 in £5 notes, £150 in silver and £1 in copper, which were bound up in six parcels which were put into a canvas bag. Power collected the money from the bank that afternoon and he and Cahill met Griffin at the Rocklands camp. Griffin told Power he would take care of the money for him so that the trooper could get a good night's sleep. He then took the parcel of cash to Mrs. Ottley's.

=== The murders ===
On the following day, 30 October, troopers Power and Cahill remained in camp and Griffin went to town to meet with the Chinese miners. He met them mid-morning at the Club-house and handed over six rolls of £1 notes (totalling £252), each bound in a handwritten memorandum of the amounts due. While Griffin was in Rockhampton, the escort money was locked in the room that Griffin had been occupying, on the verandah of Mrs. Ottley's residence.

The next morning, 31 October, Griffin brought the parcel of cash that had been in his safe-keeping to Power. It was bound with a different covering, which Griffin said "was for more careful conveyance". Power implored the Assistant Gold Commissioner to remove the outside cover, saying "as this is the first time I have been entrusted with such a serious responsibility, I would like to see the parcel in the same condition as I got it from the bank". Griffin replied: "Oh, I assure you it is all right; it has not been out of my possession since you gave it to me".

Power said no more, but as he was placing the parcel in the saddle bag he felt a vacant space as though one block of notes had been removed. Apprehensive and wishing to delay their departure, Power told Griffin that one of the horses had a sore back and was not fit to travel. Griffin directed Cahill to fetch the other horses. Power then communicated with Cahill in Gaelic, telling him to not bring the horses in, but drive them away to a greater distance. After some time Cahill returned, saying he could not find the horses. Griffin then directed Power to take the horse with the sore back to town and get it replaced. While he in Rockhampton Power spoke to Mr. Hall at the bank, asking him to come out and make sure the parcel "was all right". Hall told him that day was the annual balancing day at the bank and he would be out the following morning.

The bank manager, Thomas Hall, and his accountant, Reginald Zouch, travelled out to the Rocklands camp on the following morning, 1 November. Hall complained to Griffin about the delay in making a start, which the Assistant Gold Commissioner explained by saying the horses had been lost. Hall asked Griffin to seal up the bags containing the money, but Griffin claimed that would useless as the seals would break from the friction on horseback. During the conversation Griffin assured Hall and Zouch that "the money is quite safe", as it had been locked in his room "ever since Power brought it out". Later Trooper Power asked Griffin to seal the bags, indicating he would not take charge of them otherwise. Griffin then sealed the bags, including the parcel from which the roll of notes had been taken. This action was particularly consequential; if Griffin's seals were intact on arrival at Clermont, the notes would be found to be missing and suspicion would fall upon Griffin as the parcel had been in his sole possession prior to the sealing of the bags. By insisting on Griffin re-sealing the packages Power and Cahill "must have thought they had done all that was necessary, never dreaming Griffin would resort to murder".

After delays of nearly a week, the escort left the Rocklands camp on Friday, 1 November 1867, taking the road via Westwood and Gainsford. The party was made up of Assistant Gold Commissioner Griffin and Troopers Power and Cahill and carried about four thousand pounds in notes and coin. Griffin's behaviour during the preceding week, and his insistence on accompanying the escort for part of the way, was in stark contrast to the fact that during the four years of his tenure as Gold Commissioner at Clermont Griffin had travelled with the escort on only one occasion.

Despite having indicated he would accompany the escort only as far as Gogango, Griffin continued to ride with them beyond that settlement. At about noon on 4 November the party arrived at Ashcroft's accommodation house, at a place known as the Dam. A camp was established nearby and Griffin and the two troopers had lunch at Ashcroft's house and "partook of some brandy". They remained at that location for the rest of the day.

Early the next morning, 5 November, Griffin and the two troopers started for the crossing on the Mackenzie River, arriving there later that morning. They established a camp about four hundred yards from Bedford's Hotel (the Bedford Arms Hotel) and afterwards went to the hotel and had breakfast. Later that day Griffin asked the publican, Alfred Bedford, if he had any laudanum (which he had not) and told the publican he intended to return to Rockhampton the following morning. Bedford indicated he would travel back to Rockhampton with Griffin.

That night the two troopers left the hotel at about half-past eight o'clock, having had a couple of bottles of beer. Griffin went from the hotel to the camp soon afterwards, taking with him a pint bottle of brandy. During the night the publican, Arthur Bedford, was awakened by what he perceived to be a shot from a revolver. He looked at his watch and found it was close to two o'clock. As he lay between sleeping and waking, Bedford heard another shot, and looking at his watch again, found it was half-past three in the morning. Griffin arrived at the hotel about half-an-hour later. The Assistant Gold Commissioner looked tired and said he "had missed his way, and was guided up by the crowing of Bedford's cocks". Bedford asked about the revolver shots he had heard, and Griffin replied that Power had gone out to look for the horses, "had missed his way, and fired a shot to attract the camp". Griffin also denied that the earlier gun-shot had occurred. Medical testimony at Griffin's trial indicated that Trooper Power had been shot in the back of his head, with the ball exiting over the right eye. Trooper Cahill was shot on the top of his head and the bullet came out behind his left ear. It was believed that the men had been "stupefied by some narcotic, and shot whilst in a state of stupor from its effects". After he murdered the two men, Griffin extracted the money from its wrappings, which were burnt in the campfire, and rolled the bundles of cash into a blanket before proceeding to the Bedford's hotel.

Griffin and Bedford started on the road to Rockhampton at about five o'clock on 6 November. Unbeknownst to Bedford, Griffin was carrying the stolen escort money tied up in a blue blanket and took care to ride behind Bedford on the journey. About four miles from Ashroft's, one of the bundles fell out onto the road. Griffin dismounted, picked up the bundle and told Bedford to ride on. He then went into the bush beside the road and secured the bundles of cash more tightly in the blanket and strapped it to his saddle. That evening they arrived at Beattie's Hotel at Gainsford. The next day they rode to Westwood, which had a rail connection to Rockhampton. The two men completed the journey by taking the train to Rockhampton, arriving there that night. Griffin transferred the stolen money into a valise, which was left at Mrs. Ottley's residence. Between ten and twelve o'clock on the following day, 8 November, Griffin, Bedford and a man named Hornby were drinking at the Commercial Hotel at the corner of William and Quay streets in Rockhampton. Griffin paid for drinks with a one-pound note that was later identified as being part of the escort money.

On the afternoon of 8 November, news reached Rockhampton of the discovery of the bodies of troopers Power and Cahill, near their camp-site on the Mackenzie River. It was too late to start for the scene that night, but preparations were made by Sub-Inspector Elliott to form a party to travel to the Mackenzie crossing the next morning. Initial reports of the tragedy were that the troopers had been poisoned, after the discovery of several pigs that died after eating what the troopers had vomited. On Saturday morning, 9 November, as the party to investigate the deaths assembled at the train station, the bank manager Thomas Hall remarked to Griffin: "However did those two fellows get the poison; I cannot make it out?". Griffin replied: "They are not poisoned; it's all a trumped-up yarn – a false report; they are shot, and you will see if they are not".

Griffin did not leave on the train with the group of police and bank officers, but told them he would follow them to Westwood by the 11 o'clock train. He then returned to Mrs. Ottley's, retrieved the valise and went to find a spot to hide the stolen cash. The money was hidden in the hollow of a burnt stump, in the bush about twenty yards off the road about half-a-mile from Mrs. Ottley's residence. After Griffin joined the party of men at Westwood, they departed for the Mackenzie crossing on horseback. Dr. David Salmond, being unable to ride, travelled in a gig. Sub-Inspector Elliott had harboured suspicions about Griffin from when news of the deaths was received. During the journey he contrived to surreptitiously extract and dampen the caps in Griffin's revolver. The group of men arrived at the Mackenzie crossing at about nine o'clock on Monday morning, 11 November.

At the camp-site the bodies of Power and Cahill had been temporarily buried. The remains were exhumed to enable Dr. Salmond to make a post-mortem examination. Shortly afterwards Dr. Salmond told Sub-Inspector Elliott: "I have found bullet wounds in the heads of these men!". Elliott cautioned the doctor to keep that information to himself for the present time. He then approached Detective Kilfeder and advised him that he intended to arrest Griffin. Kilfeder engaged Griffin in conversation and, at a pre-arranged signal, the policemen seized Griffin by the wrists and handcuffed him. Elliott said: "I arrest you on suspicion of having murdered John Power and Patrick Cahill". Griffin drew a long breath, "which was half a groan", and said quietly: "Well, I could only expect it, as I was the last person known to be in the company of the poor fellows".

=== The inquiry ===
The party adjourned to Bedford's Hotel where an inquiry into the murders was commenced, conducted by Henry Abbott, the general manager of the A.J.S. Bank in Queensland, who was the only Justice of the Peace present.

At the inquiry, information was elicited regarding the discovery of the bodies. During Bedford's absence, the hotel was left in the charge of a married couple, John and Mrs. Peterson. Mid-morning on Thursday, 6 November, after Griffin and Bedford had departed for Rockhampton, Mrs. Peterson went across to the camp to retrieve a billy she had lent to the men. She saw one of the men, who appeared to be lying asleep on his blankets. She called out, but receiving no reply, returned to the hotel and told her husband the troopers were asleep in their camp. The next morning John Peterson was out looking for horses and passed by near the camp. He noticed "a bad smell" and went to investigate, when he discovered the two troopers lying dead within a few feet of each other. Mr. Armstrong, who had arrived at the hotel the previous afternoon, rode to the Native Police barracks on the Mackenzie River near 'Wilpend' station and informed Sub-Inspector Uhr, the officer in charge, of the discovery. Acting Sub-Inspector Stokes was the first policeman on the scene, arriving at the camp-site in the afternoon. Uhr attended the scene later that afternoon and concluded the troopers had been poisoned. He then hurried off to report the incident, riding a hundred miles in ten hours with one arm in a sling. When he arrived at Gainsford, Constable Moynihan, who was stationed at that township, conveyed Uhr's written report to Sub-Inspector Elliott in Rockhampton.

Dr. Salmond told the inquiry that both men had been shot through the head, but he was unable to ascertain whether they had been previously drugged. He had taken the stomachs of the victims for analysis. Acting Sub-Inspector Stokes described the positions of the bodies, lying side-by-side, their heads nine feet apart and their feet six feet apart. Of their revolvers, one was fully loaded and the other had one chamber empty from a recent discharge. In the fire Stokes found charred remains of what appeared to be the covering of the parcels of banknotes.

After hearing the evidence, Abbott decided there was enough to justify holding Griffin on remand to Rockhampton and Griffin was placed in the custody of Sub-Inspector Uhr and his troopers.

The news of Griffin's arrest caused "widespread excitement" in Rockhampton. From the start, opinions in the community were greatly divided. Griffin's friends and supporters were convinced "it was a trumped-up charge" and the arrest had been "mere officiousness on the part of Sub-Inspector Elliott". On 17 November a "great crowd" assembled at Rockhampton railway station to witness Griffin's arrival in handcuffs, but he was taken off the train at Yeppen, on the outskirts of the township, and conveyed to the lockup from there.

=== Police court ===
After the news of Griffin's arrest on double murder charges and in the lead-up to his first appearance in court, the local press coverage of Griffin's arrest became a story of its own, with the editors of Rockhampton's rival newspapers, the Rockhampton Bulletin and the Northern Argus, accusing each other of unprofessional reporting. On 16 November, prior to Griffin's arrival in custody back in Rockhampton, the editor of the Northern Argus accused its rival newspaper of "pointing to Mr. Griffin... as the perpetrator of the deed". The editorial in the Argus went on to express doubts about Griffin's guilt, stating: "The accused appears to us to be the victim of circumstances over which he had no control", adding the observation that "accident may have placed him in a position which might have been the fate of any one of us, and we trust... that the public will accord him the benefit of the doubt". The Rockhampton Bulletin countered with an editorial on 19 November which described the comments published in the Northern Argus as "foolish and slanderous assertions" and accused the newspaper of committing the "grave offence of defending Griffin", thus serving to arrogate "the functions of advocate, judge and jury".

Griffin was placed in the Rockhampton lockup under the charge of Constable McMulken. Soon after his incarceration Griffin asked McMulken to post a letter for him, addressed to a woman in Melbourne. The constable agreed, but took the letter directly to Sub-Inspector Elliott who opened it and read the contents. Elliott then forwarded the letter, together with particulars of Griffin's arrest, to the Chief Inspector of Police in Melbourne, asking him to make enquiries about the woman. By this means Elliott soon afterwards received information about the existence of Griffin's wife, to whom Griffin had been paying an allowance since she discovered he was alive and living at Clermont.

The inquiry that began at Bedford's hotel at the Mackenzie crossing was resumed in the Rockhampton Police Court on 21 November 1867. Griffin was brought before the Bench, made up of the Police Magistrate and two other magistrates (one of whom was Henry Abbott), "charged on suspicion with wilfully murdering John Power and Patrick Cahill, troopers of the Clermont gold escort". The public interest in the murders was so great that a crowd gathered to watch Griffin's first appearance in court. When the doors to the Court House were opened, a rush of people entered the building in a desperate attempt to secure sitting or standing room, while people also crowded onto the verandah and around the windows to peer in from outside. Griffin's legal team consisted of Rees Rutland Jones and Henry John Milford. At the commencement Milford asked if he could communicate privately with his client without the presence of a policeman, but the Police Magistrate denied his request. The Clerk of the Court then read the depositions from the initial inquiry conducted by magistrate Abbott at Bedford's hotel on 11 November. During the remainder of the proceedings testimony from a number of witnesses was heard, dealing with Griffin's arrest, the discovery of the bodies and descriptions of the murder scene. Sergeant Julian also gave evidence about Griffin's behaviour prior to departing for Clermont with Power and Cahill.

During James Julian's testimony the police sergeant expressed the opinion that Griffin had been "in the first stages of delirium tremens". During the various aborted attempts to start for Clemont before he was dismissed, Julian thought that Griffin was "eccentric in his orders", adding that "I believe that on the occasion he was mad, and I think he is mad now". Lorna McDonald, in her 1981 book Rockhampton: A History of City & District, suggests that Griffin's mental state prior to the police escort leaving Rockhampton was ignored, citing Sergeant Julian's belief that Griffin was in the first stages of delirium tremens. McDonald wrote that "with the advantage of hindsight, it is apparent that Griffin suffered from some form of mental illness, possibly schizophrenia". However, with a limited knowledge and understanding of such illnesses in the 1860s, and the fact that Griffin claimed in court that he did not murder the troopers, Griffin's mental state did not form part of his defence.

At the conclusion of the depositions and examination of witnesses relating to the initial inquiry, Sub-Inspector Elliott said he "was not in a position to go on with the case" and asked that the prisoner be remanded for a further eight days. This was agreed to and the prisoner was removed from the courtroom. The hearing re-commenced on Thursday, 28 November before the Police Magistrate. Much of that day was taken up by the re-reading of depositions, insisted upon by Griffin's attorney. Evidence was then presented regarding the payment of cash to the six Chinese miners and Griffin's payment, with a stolen note, for drinks at the Commercial Hotel after his return to Rockhampton. Witnesses continued to be examined in the case over the following two days: Friday, 29 November, and Saturday, 30 November. At the conclusion of the proceedings on 30 November Sub-Inspector Elliott asked for an additional remand of eight days "for the purpose of obtaining further evidence", which was granted.

Additional evidence was presented in the Police Court on Monday, 9 December, and the case for the prosecution concluded on the following day, Tuesday, 10 December. The prisoner was then asked if he had anything to say, in answer to the charge brought against him. Griffin stated in a firm tone of voice: "I have, your Worship, simply to say that I am entirely innocent of the charge which has been preferred against me". He then added: "Had I been allowed the common privileges afforded to suspected felons I should not this day be standing where I am, but under advice I reserve my defence". At the close of proceedings Griffin was formally committed for trial at a sitting of the Supreme Court on 16 March 1868. The prisoner was later transferred to Brisbane Gaol to await his trial.

=== The trial ===
In March 1868 Justice Alfred Lutwyche, accompanied by "an unusually large number of barristers and other legal gentlemen", travelled from Brisbane to Rockhampton aboard the S.S. Leichhardt for the trial of Thomas Griffin. The prisoner was transferred from Brisbane aboard the same steamer.

Proceedings at the Rockhampton Circuit Court commenced on 16 March 1868, presided over by Justice Lutwyche. Thomas John Griffin was indicted on the charge "that he did, on the 6th November 1867, at the Mackenzie River, feloniously, wilfully, and of malice aforethought, kill and murder Patrick Cahill and John Power". When asked by the Clerk of Arraigns how he pleaded, Griffin emphatically replied: "Not guilty". The prosecution was carried out by the Queensland Attorney-General, Ratcliffe Pring, and Charles Lilley, Q.C. Griffin's defence team consisted of the barristers Edward MacDevitt, Henry Hely and Samuel Griffith, instructed by Henry Milford and Rees Jones. MacDevitt and his two colleagues had formally undertaken to defend Griffin on Saturday evening, 14 March, two days before the trial was to commence. In view of the short time-frame MacDevitt requested a postponement of two days so "he and his learned friends" could have the opportunity of perusing the depositions and acquaint themselves with the circumstances of the case. Justice Lutwyche agreed to the request and remanded the prisoner until Wednesday morning, 18 March.

A jury of twelve jurors was empanelled when the trial resumed on 18 March, a process that "occupied a considerable time". In stating the case for the Crown, Attorney-General Pring explained that a considerable mass of evidence, which by its character was circumstantial, would be presented to support the charge against the prisoner. He explained to the jury that circumstantial evidence was necessary in a Court of Justice in cases "where human eye may not have witnessed the perpetration of the deed". The first witness to be called was Sergeant James Julian. During Julian's testimony, Griffin's defence barrister, Edward MacDevitt, objected to evidence of a robbery being presented, a charge on which the prisoner had not been indicted. He submitted that "this collateral fact of a robbery was inadmissible" as evidence on the murder charge against the prisoner. However, the judge ruled that the evidence of the robbery was admissible. After the indictment on 14 March, the trial proper was conducted over a period of six sitting days. Witnesses for the prosecution gave evidence and were cross-examined from Wednesday, 18 March, to Saturday, 21 March. After a brief adjournment, the trial recommenced on Tuesday, 24 March, during which five witnesses for the defence, including Mrs. Elizabeth Ottley, gave evidence. The testimony of several of the defence witnesses represented an attempt to indicate Griffin was not in pecuniary difficulties. In his summing up, which occupied two hours, MacDevitt appealed to the jury in defence of the prisoner. He admitted "that the facts raised a great suspicion of the prisoner's guilt", but warned the jury they had to be certain beyond all reasonable doubt. The Attorney-General then addressed the jury, summarising the case for the prosecution.

The trial concluded on Wednesday, 25 March 1868. The summing up of the evidence by Justice Lutwyche occupied four and a half hours. The jury retired at ten minutes past three o'clock in the afternoon. Griffin was temporarily removed to the lockup cell to await the verdict. After an hour the jury returned to the court-room and the foreman announced a verdict of guilty. The prisoner was then asked if he had anything to say as to why sentence of death should not be passed upon him. Griffin rose to his feet, "trembling with excitement for a moment", and in a clear voice "made a long disconnected statement".

After Griffin had finished Justice Lutwyche addressed the prisoner directly, informing him that he had been found guilty of wilful murder, a crime the judge described as "unparalleled in the annals of Australian history". In regard to the quality of the evidence, Justice Lutwyche remarked: "I can say that sitting in my place here I never heard circumstantial evidence of guilt more satisfactory, or more conclusive". The judge then pronounced a sentence of death upon Griffin. Justice Lutwyche appeared to be "deeply affected at the conclusion of the address, and was overcome with emotion, a feeling that communicated itself to many in the Court".

=== The condemned cell ===
Several points of law that had arisen during Griffin's trial were argued in Brisbane before the Full Bench of the Supreme Court on 15 May, and all were dismissed. With the conviction and sentence confirmed, the date of Griffin's execution was fixed for 1 June 1868. In his Rockhampton prison cell, the prisoner had "maintained a careless, nonchalant air"; he ate and slept well and "amused himself by reading novels". During the visits of his friends Griffin "generally appeared affected at first, but he quickly relapsed into a hard and indifferent mood". Griffin was visited by Anglican and Presbyterian clergymen, to whom he continued to maintain his innocence. A number of attempts were made to induce the prisoner to confess to the murders of Power and Cahill, but on each occasion he refused.

About two weeks before his execution, Griffin made an attempt to escape from captivity by promising one of the gaolers the money he had stolen from the escort. The details of Griffin's escape plan and confession to the gaoler (known as a turnkey) was only revealed after his execution. After Griffin had been informed that his death warrant had been signed, the condemned prisoner began an attempt to convince the Assistant Turnkey, Alfred Grant, to help him escape, "holding out to him hopes of receiving the lost money" in return. He did this at various times, with "hints and snatches of conversation", whenever he had the opportunity to speak to Grant alone. Grant "was to endeavour to effect his escape", and if that failed to procure for the prisoner poison or a knife so he could commit suicide. Grant reported Griffin's overtures to the Principal Turnkey, John Lee, and the two gaolers arranged a routine that allowed the prisoner frequent opportunities to speak privately to Grant. Griffin's approach to Grant required an admission of guilt for the murders, in order to convince the turnkey he knew of the location of the stolen cash. His account of what happened at the Mackenzie camp, a confession brought about in the hope of escape rather than from remorse, made it seem like Griffin had killed the troopers in self-defence (an account that Bird describes as "a tissue of lies"). The editorial in the Northern Argus described Griffin's version of the events, as told to Grant, as "utterly false".

On 26 May Griffin gave Grant a pencil sketch of the locality where he had hidden the stolen escort money. Grant was "unacquainted with the locality", which was in the vicinity of Mrs. Ottley's residence. When he showed the map to John Lee, the Principal Turnkey was skeptical and told Grant that Griffin was making a fool of him, as the locality had already been thoroughly searched. The next day, Griffin asked Grant if he had studied the map; the turnkey replied that he could not understand it and gave Griffin paper and a pencil to give him "a plainer one". When Grant compared the two maps, as he later described, he "found them alike in every respect, which strengthened my belief in their truth".

That evening Grant asked Lee to accompany him the location indicated by Griffin's maps. According to Grant's later account, Lee asked: "Should you find it, what do you intend to do with it?". Grant replied that he intended to "take it to the Sheriff and ask him to exempt me from duty till after the execution". The two turnkeys went to the locality that evening but the search was unsuccessful. On the evening of Saturday, 30 May, Grant and Lee returned to continue the search, again without success.

The Presbyterian minister, Rev. Alexander Smith, was in daily attendance with the condemned man during the week before his execution. The gallows was erected near the north-west corner of the gaol on Saturday, 30 May, with several feet of the framework visible above the wall. Three of the sides were covered with black calico. Smith visited Griffin late on Sunday night and remained with him throughout most of the night and the morning of the execution.

=== Execution ===
On the morning of the execution the prisoner was attended by Rev. Smith. Griffin dressed "with great care" in evening attire. The hangman was John Hutton, who had travelled from Brisbane to carry out the execution. Shortly before eight o'clock Hutton entered the cell and pinioned the prisoner's arms to his side. At the foot of the gallows Griffin knelt and engaged in prayers with the clergyman. During this time the hangman stood a few feet from the prisoner with his back to him, "his head turning every now and then impatiently at the length of the prayers". On the scaffold Hutton asked the condemned man if he wished to make a confession, to which he replied: "No, I have nothing to confess". The white cap was placed in position, and, as though "impatient at any delay", Griffin said: "Go on, I am ready". Inside the gaol grounds the execution was witnessed by about sixty people. Outside the walls "a considerable crowd had collected", including one person who climbed a tree to witness the hanging.

Griffin was hanged at the Rockhampton Gaol on 1 June 1868, the first person to be executed in Rockhampton. His was the first of eight legal executions that took place in Rockhampton between 1868 and 1890. The journalist for the Rockhampton Bulletin commented on Griffin's death: "As he lived so has he died – hard, callous, and impenitent".

After Griffin's execution, his body was placed in a coffin and transported to the Rockhampton Cemetery, where he was buried in the Church of England section of the grounds.

Various souvenirs were collected after Griffin's execution. It is believed the clothes that Griffin was hanged in, along with his beard, which was shaved off, went to the hangman, John Hutton. Griffin's service medals went to a local solicitor while his gold watch was sold to a slaughterman. The revolver he is said to have shot Cahill and Power with went to Carella Station, near Jundah on the Thomson River, but was later destroyed in a fire.

=== Aftermath ===
After Griffin's execution Lee and Grant made a third unsuccessful attempt to find the money, in the process discovering they had been searching on the wrong road on the previous occasions. On their return Grant remarked to the Gaolkeeper, Edward Sheehy, that he thought he had found out the location of the stolen money, "but I find I have been made a fool of". He then related the particulars of his interactions with Griffin. That evening Sheehy mentioned the matter to the Sheriff, Arthur Halloran, who asked Grant the following morning to show him the pencil sketches the prisoner had made. Halloran told Grant to go out again with somebody well acquainted with the place. During their conversation the Sheriff said, "I am sorry you did not tell me of it before the execution", to which Grant replied: "I cannot vouch for the truth of it now, and to obtain what I have obtained required the greatest secrecy".

The Sheriff then sent Lee and Grant out to once again search for the money. The next day the A.J.S. Bank manager, Thomas Hall, and another man joined the search. The money inside a valise was eventually found inside a half-burnt stump, with another stump placed up against it to cover the contents. The money had been hidden about half-a-mile from Mrs. Ottley's residence, about twenty yards from the road and about the same distance from the Saw Mill paddock fence.

On 18 June 1868 an inquiry was held at Rockhampton Gaol regarding the conduct of the turnkeys Lee and Grant, with reference to Griffin's confession. All those involved in obtaining the confession and the finding of the stolen escort money were examined (but not on oath), and their statements forwarded to Brisbane "for the consideration of the Government". In July 1868 it was reported that Lee and Grant had been dismissed from their positions, though further details were not known. The report in the Northern Argus commented: "The minds of the community have been in such an excited state since the murder, for the commission of which the authorities are in some measure to blame, by having elected a man of Griffin's stamp to fill a position so onerous and responsible, that nothing connected with the melancholy affair should be kept in the dark". In August 1868 a letter from Alfred Grant, explaining the details from his point of view of Griffin's confession and the discovery of the stolen money, was published in The Queenslander magazine.

=== Harriett Griffin ===
Harriett Griffin died on 23 November 1888 in the Melbourne Benevolent Asylum at Hotham, aged 74 years. Her occupation was recorded as 'nurse'. The cause of her death was recorded as "Asthenia", from which she had suffered for one week before her death. Harriett Griffin was buried in the Melbourne General Cemetery.

== Griffin's skull ==
=== Decapitation of the corpse ===
At about the time of Griffin's execution Robert Tucker, an undertaker and the sexton in charge of Rockhampton cemetery, reported a rumour to a member of the Cemetery Board to the effect that "an attempt would be made to raise" Griffin's body. After he was hanged, Griffin's remains were buried in a coffin to a depth of six feet, in the Anglican section of the cemetery. As a precaution against possible exhumation or other disturbance, slabs were put across the grave about two feet below the surface. A day or two after Griffin's burial, a man (name unknown) who had died aboard the Tinonee steamer was taken to the cemetery to be buried. As an extra precaution, the sexton and several of the board members decided to bury the man directly above Griffin's coffin.

On Sunday morning, 7 June, the sexton discovered that the grave had been disturbed. After he reported the incident, two constables were placed on watch to protect the grave. The Cemetery Board met the next day, at the conclusion of which a telegram was sent to the Colonial Secretary seeking permission to open the grave to ascertain the extent of the disturbance. Permission was granted and the Board met again on Wednesday morning, 10 June. That afternoon a group gathered at the Rockhampton Cemetery, which included three trustees and the secretary of the Rockhampton Cemetery Board, doctors Salmond and Thon, and a police sergeant and three constables. At a depth of about two feet the sexton and his workman uncovered the coffin holding the body of the unnamed man. The coffin had been opened and re-fastened, but otherwise had not been interfered with. After examination the lid was nailed shut and lowered into a nearby newly dug grave. After considerable effort, the lower coffin was lifted "and submitted to examination". Upon opening, a headless corpse was revealed. The remains were then turned out of the coffin, which both doctors at the scene identified as the body of Griffin. At the conclusion of the examination Griffin's body "was returned to the coffin and restored to its resting place". Both graves were then filled in.

=== Media coverage ===
After previously criticising each other's coverage of Griffin's arrest, Rockhampton's two local newspapers were again at odds over each other's coverage and publicly stated positions regarding the events that took place in the cemetery. In the same issue that reported the examination of Griffin's grave, the editor of the Rockhampton Bulletin described the desecration of the murderer's corpse as "human vengeance" upon "its victim". The editorial expressed outrage that unscrupulous persons would "disturb his last resting-place and tear his poor remains from the grave", asserting that "the grave of the felon should be as sacred from violation as that of any other sinner". Two days later the editorial in the Northern Argus led with: "We don't see anything very horrible in the fact of Griffin's head having been cut off and carried away – if it was wanted we could very well spare it; we do not regard the act as desecration, neither as criminal, although we do not envy the person who undertook and carried out a very nasty piece of business". The editorial was scathing of the description of Griffin in the Bulletin as a "victim", asking the question, "if Griffin be a victim what are those murdered men to be called whose bones lie whitening in the far bush, whose lives were taken to gratify a lust for gold, yea, and while they were sleeping?". Both editorials were critical of the decision of the sexton, with the approval of two of the cemetery trustees, to place the coffin of the unknown man above "the coffin of a felon".

In the same issue of the Northern Argus it was reported that a meeting of the Cemetery Committee had passed a vote of censure upon the sexton. The meeting also agreed to send a telegram to the Government informing them that Griffin's grave had been opened, "the body had been deprived of its head", and suggesting "a reward should be offered for the perpetrator of the deed". The Government responded by offering a reward of £20, "to be paid upon the conviction of the person or persons who mutilated Griffin's body". In its issue of the same day, the Rockhampton Bulletin expressed outrage at the reward being not more than would be offered "for a good horse or bullock", describing the offer as "a disgrace to the Government". The writer maintained that "the desecration of the dead is a barbarity" and "it makes not the slightest difference whether it was the head of a saint or a sinner that was robbed from the grave". The article in the Bulletin claimed that the police were "in possession of information which points indubitably to two persons" and maintained "there must have been not less than four persons engaged in lifting the coffin out, besides a man to watch". Two days later the Northern Argus described the "small reward offered by the Government" as being "exactly nineteen pounds, nineteen shillings and eleven pence, three farthings too much", adding that if anyone involved in the affair, who informed against their companions, deserved "to be whipped round the town with a cat's tail".

It was later revealed a Northern Argus journalist was one of those present when the grave robbery took place.

=== The perpetrators revealed ===
From the outset speculation was rife that the persons responsible for stealing Griffin's head were men with an interest in medicine and the science of phrenology, who wished to study the shape of the murderer's skull in an attempt to find an explanation for the crime for which he was convicted. A series of newspaper articles published in the early twentieth-century eventually shed light on the identities of those responsible for the grave robbery.

John Bird, in his Early History of Rockhampton (published in 1904), does not name those responsible, but claimed to know their identities. He states there were only two men who participated in the removal of Griffin's head, both of whom were alive in 1904 and residents of Rockhampton. In 1904 one of the participants was still in possession of the skull. By Bird's account, the two men were aware of the man from the Tinonee being buried above Griffin; they removed the first coffin before opening Griffin's casket and securing their objective.

In July 1918 Bird provided further details about the perpetrators, when he responded to unfounded newspaper speculation that it was not Griffin's head that was taken. In comments published in the Morning Bulletin, Bird declared conclusively that it was Griffin's head that was removed. He further describes the two men who performed the deed as "a well-known Rockhampton surgeon" and "a well-known mariner" (both of whom had died several years previously). Both men were "intimately acquainted with Griffin" and neither "could possibly have been deceived" as to the identity of the corpse. The doctor buried the head "in the garden of a friend until an opportunity was afforded to further deal with it". Bird stated that the doctor "no doubt desired to have the head for scientific reasons and he had the skull in his surgery until the day of his death".

The publication of the July 1918 article prompted former Northern Argus editor and journalist W. H. Leighton Bailey, then living in England, to write to the Morning Bulletin in October 1918. Bailey confirmed Bird's version as being "nearest the truth" in regard to who possessed the head, and named the medical practitioner as Dr. William Callaghan.^{[E]} Bailey's letter also stated that he was present at the cemetery when Griffin's head was taken, together with Robert H. D. White, manager of the Rockhampton branch of the Bank of New South Wales.

In 1922 the Melbourne newspaper The Australasian published an article about the removal of Griffin's head, which described the unnamed perpetrators as "three friends – banker, surgeon, and editor". The anonymous writer of the article claimed to have heard the story from two of the participants, the editor and the banker, when he was "very young". The writer also stated that, "many years after the incident", he saw the skull displayed in a glass cabinet in the banker's drawing room. By that stage the 'banker' was "a staid, elderly member of the Cabinet".

In 1928 The Australasian published another article about the removal of Griffin's head, referencing the 1922 article, and quoting a recent letter from John Bird to the Rockhampton journalist and writer J. Grant Pattison. Bird's letter confirmed Dr. Callaghan's identity as the surgeon. He also named a fourth person who participated in the removal of the head – William Holland, known as 'Old Bill', who was a hospital wardsman. Holland had been a mariner (which explains Bird's 1918 reference to a surgeon and a mariner as the two men who carried out the beheading). Bird claimed that Callaghan kept the skull in his surgery and had shown it to him on "two or three occasions". Bird also provided details from a letter written in 1900 by Dr. Callaghan to the pastoralist, John A. Macartney, in which the doctor invited Macartney to see Griffin's skull "any time you call on me when in town". In his correspondence with Macartney, Callaghan also referred to the visit to Rockhampton several months after the grave robbery by the Premier of Queensland, Arthur Palmer. The doctor was at the wharf when the steamer from Brisbane arrived; Palmer greeted Callaghan and asked, "have you a specimen of anatomy at your house?". Callaghan replied in the affirmative, to which Palmer said: "I thought when offering the reward, that it was £19/19s/11 too much, but, of course, I had to do something". This letter was also published in Pattison's 1939 book, Battler's Tales of Early Rockhampton, but with the names omitted. Historian Lorna McDonald, in her 1981 book Rockhampton: A History of City & District, confirms the accepted view that it was Dr. William Callaghan who removed Griffin's head and took possession of the skull.

In his 1939 book, James Grant Pattison claimed Griffin's skull was kept in a glass case for many years but it was damaged when one of the holder's children attempted to practice dentistry by smashing the lower jaw to obtain the teeth. Pattison claimed it was passed onto the Rockhampton School of Arts in 1934.

== The victims ==
The two men murdered by Griffin had known each other since childhood. They were both raised in the vicinity of Carrick-on-Suir township, which straddles the border between County Tipperary and County Waterford in south-east Ireland. In their formative years, both Cahill and Power received their education under the Cistercian Fathers at the Mount Melleray Seminary, near Cappoquin in County Waterford.

- Patrick William Cahill – born in 1840 in Ballyneale, a rural district near Carrick-on-Suir in County Tipperary, the son of William Cahill and Mary (née Lonergan). He was the eldest of five children. Patrick's mother died in 1848. His father later remarried and had a further eleven children with his second wife, born between 1853 and 1869. Cahill emigrated to Australia in about 1861, after which he held "various positions" in Victoria and New South Wales. In 1865 he met up with John Power in Brisbane and the two young men "formed that close friendship which united their destinies for ever". Cahill was described as being nearly six feet tall, with "lustrous dark-hazel eyes" and dark hair. Cahill was aged 27 years when he was murdered by Thomas John Griffin on 6 November 1867 on the MacKenzie River near Rockhampton.
- John Francis Power – baptised in February 1841 at Carrick-on-Suir in County Tipperary, the son of Richard and Mary Power. He, along with his elder brother Pierce, was educated at the Mount Melleray Seminary near Cappoquin, under the Cistercian Fathers, where he received "a liberal course of instruction, including the classics and modern languages". Power immigrated to Australia aboard the Prince Consort, arriving at Brisbane on 2 November 1862. His older brother Pierce, who was ordained as a Roman Catholic priest, had travelled to Australia several months earlier aboard the ill-fated Erin-go-Bragh. John Power was possessed of "some capital". After remaining in Ipswich "for some months", he and another man travelled to north Queensland in search of pastoral land, visiting the Suttor River district (inland from Mackay) and onto the Flinders River region, south of the Gulf of Carpentaria. Power eventually entered into a partnership managing a pastoral property on the Flinders River. In about August 1865 John Power met with his brother in Brisbane and accompanied him to Gayndah, north of Brisbane, to take up the position of Catholic priest in that community. Father Pierce Power accidentally drowned in the Burnett River at Gayndah on the evening of 18 October 1865, just "a few short weeks" after arriving in the township. John Power was in Rockhampton when he heard of his brother's death "and the shock occasioned him a severe illness", from which he eventually recovered. During his absence Power's partner on the Flinders River was "said to have sold out... and decamped with the money". Due to the sudden change in fortune, "Power found himself obliged to seek some other means of livelihood". At about this time he met up with Patrick Cahill in Brisbane and the two decided to join the Queensland police. Power was murdered by Thomas John Griffin on 6 November 1867 on the MacKenzie River near Rockhampton, aged 26 years.

When Cahill and Power enquired about positions as police troopers in the Rockhampton region, they were informed of two vacancies in the Clermont gold escort. They travelled to Clermont and met with the Gold Commissioner, Thomas Griffin, in January 1867, by which time one of the vacancies had been filled. Griffin selected Power to take the remaining position. However, "without an instant's hesitation" Power declined the offer in favour of Cahill "who, he said, was not so able to rough it in the bush as he was". Cahill refused to accept his friend's sacrifice. The situation was resolved "by one receiving the actual appointment, and the other being named as supernumerary till the next vacancy should occur".

After they were murdered by Griffin, the bodies of the two troopers were wrapped in paperbark and buried by native police officers. The skulls of the murdered troopers were taken to Brisbane after Griffin's trial, but were later returned to Rockhampton to be interred with the bodies. Their bodies were later exhumed and reburied in the Rockhampton cemetery.

A public funeral was held in Rockhampton for Cahill and Power on 15 July 1869 – more than twenty months after their deaths. A service at the Roman Catholic Church was held before the procession made its way to the cemetery where a burial service took place, which included three volleys being fired over the grave at the conclusion of the service.

=== Police memorials ===
The Queensland Police Service residences in the inner Brisbane suburb of Herston are known as the Patrick William Cahill Unit and the John Francis Power Unit, named in Cahill and Power's honour. The residences were officially opened in August 2005 and provide accommodation to officers of the Queensland Police Service and their family members.

In 2008 the story of the Cahill and Power murders was incorporated into a presentation at the Queensland Police Museum in Roma Street, Brisbane.

The Queensland Water Police vessels, P.W. Cahill I and P.W. Cahill II, stationed at the Whitsundays, were named in honour of Patrick William Cahill.

The location where the police troopers John Power and Patrick Cahill were murdered is near the present-day Bedford Weir on the Mackenzie River, 30 kilometres north of Blackwater. Bedford Weir is a popular location for recreational activities. In July 2013, at the instigation of former Blackwater police officer Senior Constable Donna Gilliland, memorial stones were placed at the Bedford Weir and plaques were erected on the graves of Cahill and Power at the South Rockhampton Cemetery. The plans to erect the memorial at the Bedford Weir received a set-back when two trunks of petrified wood, to form part of the memorial and donated by the BHP Mitsubishi Alliance, were stolen by thieves, in an operation that would have required heavy lifting equipment.

== Cultural resonance ==
Episodes in Thomas Griffin's notorious career were the foundation of Katharine King's novel Lost for Gold, first published in three volumes in 1873 by Hurst and Blackett in London. Miss King was the sister of Henry E. King, a member of the Queensland Legislative Assembly from 1870 to 1883.

== See also ==
- William Lanne, similar instance of grave-robbing and posthumous dismemberment in 1869

== Notes ==
A.Thomas John Griffin's birthplace is recorded as "Banbridge, Ireland" in the registration of his marriage to Harriett Klisser on 29 April 1857 at Essendon. After Griffin was executed on 1 June 1868, a number of contemporary newspaper accounts of his life stated he was born in county Sligo (each copied from a single source, an article published on 2 June in the Rockhampton Bulletin). The discrepancy between the sets of information possibly indicates Griffin was born at Banbridge, in county Down (in modern Northern Ireland), and raised in county Sligo (in north-west Ireland). The article about Griffin by A. A. Morrison in the Australian Dictionary of Biography states that the convicted murderer was born in County Antrim (an adjoining county to County Down).

B.Harriett Farrow was born on 8 April 1814 at East Wittering in County Sussex, England, the daughter of George Farrow and Jane (née Pollard). Her first marriage was to William Jarratt, in October 1832 at Littlehampton. She had two sons by the marriage, William (born in 1838) and George (born in 1838). Her husband, William Jarratt, died in May 1847 in County Mayo in Ireland. Harriett married Thomas Crosbie in October 1847 at Cork in south-west Ireland. In February 1851 she married Mark Lewis Klisser in Dublin (her third marriage). In accounts of Griffin's immigration to Australia, newspapers referred to Harriett as "Mrs. Crosby, a widow" (though immigration records list her surname as 'Klisser').

C.Griffin may have initially intended establishing himself as a publican in Melbourne, using Harriett's funds. At the Annual Meeting of Justices for the granting of publicans' licenses for the City of Melbourne on 28 April 1857 (the day before his marriage to Harriett Klisser), Thomas John Griffin had his application refused for the Bird-in-Hand Hotel in Flinders-lane, "on account of the dilapidated state of the premises". During March 1857 the hotel had been advertised as being available to let, for "immediate possession, terms easy".

D.Elizabeth Mary Frances Ottley was born in about 1845 in India, the daughter of Major Thomas Henry Ottley of the East India Company and his wife, Elizabeth Rebecca (née Dobell). Elizabeth was an infant when she and her mother returned to England by April 1847, where her brother Osbert was born. In April 1857 Elizabeth's father died in Bombay, India, after which his widow, Mrs. Elizabeth Ottley, received a military pension. Mrs. Ottley and her two children sailed from England aboard the Landsborough and arrived at Rockhampton in May 1865, bringing with them a piano, furniture and a sewing machine. Mrs. Ottley purchased 45 acres at Rocklands, about four miles south of Rockhampton. After Griffin's trial and execution Elizabeth Ottley married John Harcourt Wilkinson, an adjoining landholder to the Ottley family residence, on 12 November 1870 at Rocklands. The couple had four children.

E.William Callaghan was born in Ireland in about 1832. Dr. Callaghan was employed as a surgeon-superintendent on immigrant ships to Melbourne, making the voyage "on two or three occasions". After deciding to settle in Australia he practised in Melbourne before arriving in Rockhampton in July 1861. As well as his private practice, Dr. Callaghan worked at the Rockhampton hospital and was appointed District Coroner and Government Medical Officer. In January 1869 Callaghan married Harriett Cowper at Rockhampton and the couple had two sons, one of whom died as a young child. Callaghan had a keen interest in horse racing and was a founding member of the Rockhampton Jockey Club. A "few weeks" before his death a decision had been made to name the local racecourse Callaghan Park, in honour of the doctor's long association with the sport in Rockhampton. William Callaghan died on 2 April 1912 at his residence in Quay Street, Rockhampton, and was buried in the cemetery at Allenstown, in suburban Rockhampton.
