= Patrick Kenniff =

Australian bushranger (1865–1903)

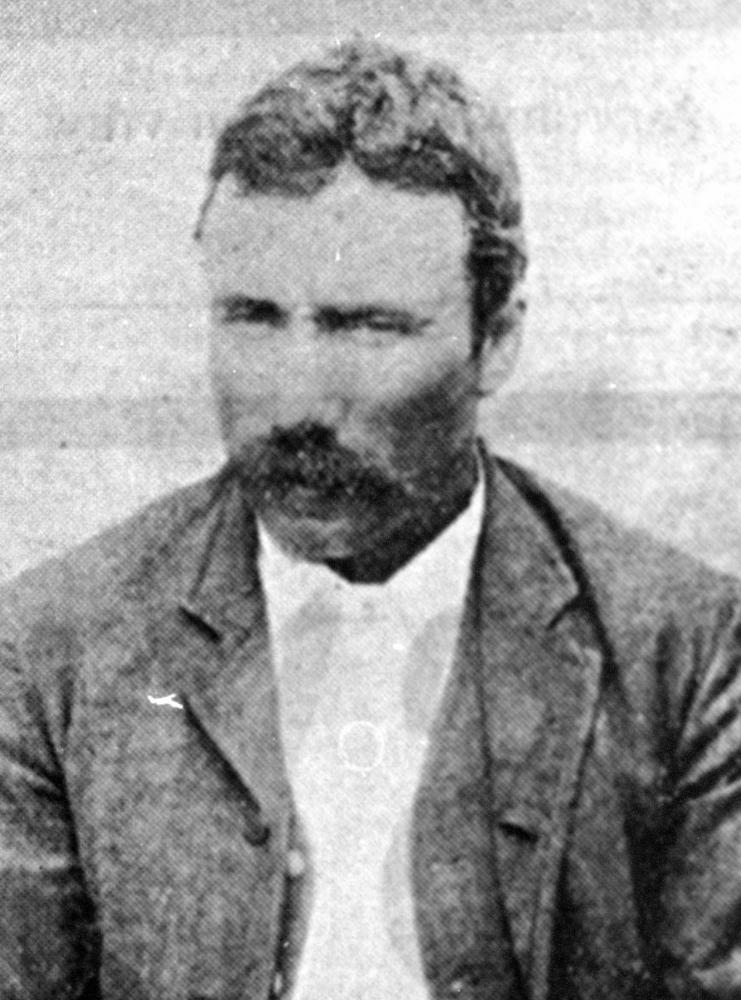
- Patrick Kenniff on trial for murder, 1902
- Born: 28 September 1865; Dungog, New South Wales, Australia
- Died: 13 January 1903 (aged 37); Boggo Road Gaol, Queensland, Australia
- Occupation: Labourer
- Status: Executed by hanging
- Conviction: Wilful murder
- Penalty: Death

Patrick Kenniff (28 September 1865 – 13 January 1903) was an Australian bushranger who roamed western Queensland, Australia, with his brother James Kenniff (1869–1940). They were primarily cattle thieves, but the brothers were found guilty of murder and Patrick was hanged in Boggo Road Gaol in 1903.

== Early life ==
Patrick was born at Main Creek, near Dungog, New South Wales, on 28 September 1863. Along with his father and three brothers, Patrick worked as a labourer in northern New South Wales in the 1880s. He had an extensive lawless history:

- 12 November 1878, at Casino, New South Wales, he was fined £5 for a breach of the Impounding Act.
- 21 January 1884, at Casino, New South Wales, he was fined £2 for riotous conduct.
- 21 February 1888, at Grafton, New South Wales, he was convicted of cattle stealing, and sentenced to four years

The Kenniff family moved across the border into the colony of Queensland in 1891.

- 14 March 1895, he and brother James were convicted at Roma, Queensland of horse stealing, and sentenced to three years
- 22 August 1899, he was convicted at Roma of receiving a stolen cheque, and sentenced to three years

After their release they moved to the Upper Warrego where their father took up a large grazing lease known as Ralph Block.

The Kenniffs became the prime suspects when cattle disappeared from neighbouring properties, local squatters demanded their eviction. The Kenniffs took up a nomadic life, riding armed through the district, they continued to steal cattle and horses and held up a general store at Yuleba. The police were so concerned that the Upper Warrego Police Station was established on the Ralph property.

== Murder and capture ==
In March 1902, a warrant was issued against the brothers for stealing a pony. A police posse set out consisting of Constable George Doyle, Albert Dahlke (the manager of Carnarvon Station), and Sam Johnson (an Aboriginal tracker). On the morning of Sunday 30 March 1902, the police party surprised the Kenniffs, who were camping at Lethbridge's Pocket, and took James into custody but Patrick managed to escape. Eighteen-year-old Tom Kenniff was also present. Sam Johnson was sent to collect the police pack horses so they could start in pursuit of Patrick Kenniff. However, on his return, he found Doyle and Dahlke were nowhere to be seen, and he was chased by the Kenniffs as he fled for help. A later search located the camp site, showing considerable evidence that a gun fight had occurred. Constable Doyle's horse was located and the saddle bags were found to contain approximately 200 pounds (91 kg) of charcoal that was later identified as burnt human remains, including some personal belongings of Doyle and Dahlke. It became apparent the Kenniffs had burnt the bodies of Doyle and Dahlke with the intention of disposing of their ashes, in an attempt to conceal evidence of the crime.

A reward of £1,000 was authorised and a large police manhunt was organised. Three months later, the brothers were captured on 23 June at now-named Arrest Creek, south of Mitchell.

== Trial ==
The Kenniff brothers were committed for trial to the Supreme Court in Brisbane, for the wilful murder of Constable George Doyle and Albert Dahlke. Doyle's Aboriginal tracker, Sam Johnson, did not see the actual murders, but he testified that he heard shooting and, when he neared the arrest scene, the Kenniffs pursued him, but he escaped. On Saturday 8 November 1902, both Patrick and James Kenniff were found guilty of murder and the judge Samuel Griffith sentenced James Kenniff to death by hanging.

In December, the court heard the appeal against the convictions. On 9 December 1902, four appeal judges upheld the conviction against Patrick Kenniff but only three of the four judges upheld the conviction against James Kenniff with Justice Patrick Real dissenting. The Kenniffs then sought to appeal to the Privy Council and a benefit concert was held on 29 December to raise funds for the appeal. Joe Lesina, a Labour Member of the Queensland Legislative Assembly for Clermont, spoke at the concert saying the evidence was not strong enough to hang the two men. On 1 January 1903 it was announced that the Executive Council of the Queensland Government had decided that Patrick Kenniff was to be hanged on Monday 12 January, while James Kenniff's sentence was reduced to life imprisonment with hard labour. The Kenniff's solicitors decided to pursue the Privy Council appeal only for James Kenniff, as Patrick Kenniff would be already executed.

Despite a number of public meetings and deputations to the Queensland Governor to postpone Patrick Kenniff's execution, he was hanged on 12 January 1903 at the Boggo Road Gaol. Although it was normal practice for prisoners executed at Boggo Road Gaol to be buried in the simplest way in unconsecrated ground in South Brisbane Cemetery, at the request of Kenniff family, it was permitted for the family to provide the coffin and a hearse, although the burial would still occur in unconsecrated ground. The coffin was polished cedar with silver mountings with religious symbols. A funeral procession of the hearse, the mourning coaches and approximately 30 other vehicles accompanied by people walking (an estimate of 400 people all together) made its way to the cemetery, where Patrick Kenniff was buried with Roman Catholic rites by Father Michael Baldwin.

After Kenniff's execution, it was reported that the cost to the government of the capture of the Kenniffs was £2911/17/8 and of the trial £690/5/2, a total of £3601/2/10.

James served twelve years. He died in Charters Towers on 8 October 1940 from cancer. In January 1941, citing an anonymous correspondent, the Truth newspaper published a version of the story purporting that James was himself alone guilty of both murders.

== Depictions ==
A 1981 play, The Execution of Steele Rudd by Australian playwright Harry Reade was premiered at the National Theatre at the Playhouse, Perth, directed by Stephen Barry. It portrays the character and actions of Rudd, a.k.a. Arthur Hoey Davis, who was then the under-sheriff who managed arrangements for Kenniff's execution. The play was also staged by Melbourne's Playbox Theatre in 1983.

In 2017, Mike Munro hosted and helped to produce a four part science-based documentary series for Foxtel's History Channel on Bushrangers. One of the one-hour specials included Munro's great uncles, Paddy and Jimmy Kenniff, one of whom was hanged in Brisbane jail in 1903 after being convicted of murdering a police constable and a station manager in the Carnarvon Ranges in Queensland. In 2017 a TV crew unearthed a bullet believed to be used by Kenniff brothers three metres from the site of the double murders.
