= Pattinson =

Pattinson is an English surname. Notable people with the surname include:

- Artie Pattinson, Australian rules footballer
- Baden Pattinson, Australian politician
- Bill Pattinson (disambiguation), multiple people
- Bob Pattinson, Australian rules footballer
- Bobby Pattinson (born 1935), English comedian and actor
- Charles Pattinson, British television producer
- Christopher Pattinson (1885–1958), Canadian provincial politician from Alberta
- Cyrus Ramone Pattinson (born 1994), English boxer
- Darren Pattinson (born 1979), English cricketer
- Derek Pattinson (1930–2006), British Anglican clergy
- Emma Pattinson, former headteacher of Epsom college
- George Pattinson (disambiguation), multiple people
- Helen Clitheroe (née Pattinton; born 1974), British runner
- Hugh Lee Pattinson (1796–1858), English industrial chemist
- Iain Pattinson (1953–2021), British scriptwriter
- James Pattison (disambiguation), multiple people
- John Pattison (disambiguation), multiple people
- Lawrence Pattinson (1890–1955), Royal Air Force officer
- Les Pattinson (born 1958), English bass guitarist
- Lewy Pattinson (1852–1944), English businessman
- Lizzy Pattinson (born 1983), British singer
- Michael Pattinson (born 1957), Australian film director
- Paul Pattison, makeup artist
- Poppy Pattinson (born 2000), English footballer who plays in the, Women's Super League
- Richard Pattinson (1773–1818), Upper Canada merchant and politician
- Robert Pattinson (disambiguation), multiple people
- Ron Pattinson (born 1956), English historian
- Samuel Pattinson, British businessman and Liberal politician
- Shaun Pattinson, British legal scholar
- Tomos Pattinson (born 2005), British cyclist
- Winifred Dakyns (née Pattinson; 1875–1960), British naval officer

== See also ==
- Soul Patts, formerly Washington H Soul Pattinson, Australian company
- Soul Pattinson Telecommunications, Australian company
- 246789 Pattinson, planet
- Thomas Pattinson Dick, English badminton player
- Pattison (disambiguation)
- Patterson (surname)
- Paterson (disambiguation)
- Peterson (surname)
