= Pattison (surname) =

Pattison is a surname that comes from North East England and Scotland, and may refer to

- Adam Pattison (born 1986), Australian rules footballer
- Andrew Pattison (born 1949), retired South African tennis player
- Andrew Seth Pringle-Pattison (1856–1931), Scottish philosopher
- Craig Pattison (born 1971), Canadian musician
- Davey Pattison (born 1945), Scottish-American singer
- Dorothy Pattison (1832–1878), British nurse, better known as Sister Dora
- Edward W. Pattison (1932–1990), US Representative from New York
- Eliot Pattison (born 1951), American lawyer
- George Pattison (born 1950), British theologian
- Harriet Pattison (1928–2023), American landscape architect
- Ian Pattison, Scottish writer
- Ian Pattison (cricketer) (born 1982), English cricketer
- Jack Pattison (1887–1970), English footballer
- James Pattison (Irish politician) (1886–1963), Irish politician
- James Pattison (London MP) (1786–1849), Member of Parliament (MP) for the City of London 1835–41, 1843–49
- Jim Pattison (born 1928), Canadian businessman
- Jimmy Pattison (baseball) (1908–1991), American baseball player
- John Pattison (RNZAF officer) (1917–2009), New Zealand WWII pilot
- John George Pattison (1875–1917), Canadian soldier and Victoria Cross recipient
- John M. Pattison (1847–1906), American politician
- Mark Pattison (academic) (1813–1884), British academic and author
- Mark Pattison (American football) (born 1961), NFL wide receiver
- Matty Pattison (born 1986), South African footballer
- Richard Dunn Pattison (1874–1916), British soldier and military historian
- Robert E. Pattison (1850–1904), American politician
- Robert Pattinson (born 1986), English actor
- Séamus Pattison (1936–2018), Irish politician, son of James Pattison
- William Pattison (disambiguation), several people
- Vicky Pattison (born 1987), British reality television series participant

== See also ==
- Patterson (surname)
- Paterson (disambiguation)
- Pattinson
