= Pattison =

Pattison may refer to:

- Pattison, Mississippi, an unincorporated community, US
- Pattison, Texas, a city, US
- NRG Station, a subway station on the Broad Street Line in Philadelphia, Pennsylvania once known as Pattison Station.
- Pattison (surname), people with the surname Pattison
- USS William J. Pattison (DE-594), a United States Navy destroyer escort converted during construction into the high-speed transport USS William J. Pattison (APD-104)
- USS William J. Pattison (APD-104), a United States Navy high-speed transport in commission from 1945 to 1946
- Pattison College, an independent school in the east of Coventry, England
- Pattisons Limited, a scotch whisky company
- Pattison Outdoor Advertising, a Canadian billboard advertising company

== See also ==
- Patterson (surname)
- Paterson (disambiguation)
- Pattinson, surname
