= Patterson =

Patterson may refer to:

== People ==
- Patterson (surname)
- Patterson family

== Places ==
=== Australia ===
- Patterson railway station

=== Canada ===
- Pattersons Corners, Ontario
- Patterson Township, Ontario
- Patterson, Calgary a neighbourhood in Calgary, Alberta.

=== United States of America ===
- Patterson, Arkansas
- Patterson, California
- Patterson, California, former name of Trigo, Madera County, California
- Patterson, California, former name of Cherokee, Nevada County, California
- Patterson, Georgia
- Patterson, Idaho
- Patterson, Iowa
- Patterson, Louisiana
- Patterson, Missouri
- Patterson, New York
- Patterson, Ohio
- Lake Patterson, a lake in Minnesota
- Patterson Springs, North Carolina
- Patterson Heights, Pennsylvania
- Patterson Township (disambiguation)
- Patterson Tract, California

== Other uses ==
- Bob Patterson (TV series), American sitcom
- C.R. Patterson and Sons, American car manufacturer from 1915 until 1939.
- Patterson (radio series), British radio series by Malcolm Bradbury
- Patterson Companies, a medical supplies conglomerate based in Minnesota
- Patterson function, X-ray crystallography
- Patterson School of Diplomacy and International Commerce, at the University of Kentucky located in Lexington, Kentucky, USA
- Patterson & Sullivan, American art company in San Francisco
- Patterson syndrome, rare disease
- Patterson-UTI, onshore contract drilling services to exploration and production companies in North America
- Patterson Viaduct, spanned the Patapsco River at Ilchester, Maryland, USA
- Patterson–Gimlin film
- Patterson Plantation, a historic house in Durham, North Carolina

== See also ==
- Paterson (disambiguation)
- Pattersonville (disambiguation)
