= William Patterson =

William or Bill Patterson may refer to:

== Politics ==
- William Patterson (New York politician) (1789–1838), U.S. representative from New York
- William Patterson (Ohio politician) (1790–1868), U.S. representative from Ohio
- William Albert Patterson (1841–1917), Canadian member of parliament
- William John Patterson (1886–1976), Canadian premier of Saskatchewan
- William G. Patterson (1923–2000), politician in Newfoundland, Canada
- William H. Patterson (1810–1888), farmer, Baptist preacher and politician from Virginia
- William L. Patterson (1891–1980), American civil rights activist; US Communist Party leader
- R. William Patterson (1908–1994), American politician; mayor of Dayton, Ohio
- William Patterson (Alberta politician) (1908–1996), Alberta MLA, 1959–1967
- William Worth Patterson (1849–1921), mayor of Ashland, Kentucky

== Sport ==
- Bill Patterson (footballer, born 1888) (1888–1956), former Australian rules footballer for St Kilda
- Bill Patterson (footballer, born 1873) (1873–1939), former Australian rules footballer for Carlton
- Billy Patterson (1918–1998), American football player for the Chicago Cardinals and Pittsburgh Pirates
- Bill Patterson (racing driver) (1923–2010), Australian motor racing driver
- Bill Patterson (rugby union) (1936–1999), English rugby union player
- William Patterson (cricketer, born 1854) (1854–1939), English amateur cricketer
- William Patterson (cricketer, born 1859) (1859–1946), English amateur cricketer
- Will Patterson (born 1987), American football linebacker
- William Patterson (footballer) (1914–?), Scottish footballer

== Others ==
- William Patterson (engineer) (1795–1869), 19th century engineer and boat builder
- W. H. Patterson (William Hammond Patterson, 1847–1896), British trade unionist
- William Patrick Patterson, author and spiritual teacher of The Fourth Way
- William A. Patterson (1899–1980), president of United Airlines from 1934 until 1966
- William R. Patterson (born 1975), American motivational speaker
- William Patterson, author of subjects and dialogues for the comic strip Jeff Hawke
- William Patterson (priest) (1930–2002), Anglican priest
- William Patterson (Maryland businessman) (1752–1835), businessman and a founder of the Baltimore and Ohio Railroad
  - SS William Patterson, a Liberty ship
- William James Patterson (1838–1926), commander-in-chief of the Grand Army of the Republic
- Spaceman Patterson (William Patterson), composer, arranger and producer
- William Patterson, a fictional character from the American crime drama television series Blindspot

== See also ==
- Willie Patterson (disambiguation)
- William Paterson (disambiguation)
- William Pattison (disambiguation)
