= Willie Patterson =

Willie Patterson may refer to:

- Willie Patterson (writer) (?–1956), British comic writer
- Willie Patterson (baseball) (1919–2004), American baseball player

== See also ==
- William Patterson (disambiguation)
- Willie Paterson (1913–1928), Scottish footballer
- Willis Patterson (1930–2025), American musical artist and academic
