= George Pattinson (disambiguation) =

George Pattinson may refer to:

- George Pattinson (1854–1931), Canadian politician
- George Pattinson (footballer) (1914–2003), Australian rules footballer

== See also ==
- Pattinson (surname)
- George Pattison, English theologian and Anglican priest
- George Pattison (footballer), Australian rules footballer
