= James Pattison =

James Pattison may refer to:

- Jim Pattison (James Allen Pattison, born 1928), Canadian business magnate
- Jimmy Pattison (baseball) (James Wells Pattison, 1908–1991), Major League pitcher
- James Pattison (banker), Governor of the Bank of England
- James Pattison (British Army officer) (1723–1805), Royal Artillery officer
- James Pattison (Irish politician) (1886–1963), Labour party politician
- James Pattison (London MP) (1794–1849), Liberal Party politician
- James Grant Pattison (1862–1946), Australian journalist and author
- James Pattison (1828 ship), merchant sailing ship

== See also ==
- James Pattison Cockburn (1779–1847), British author and artist
- James Pattison Walker (1823–1906), British surgeon
