= Gene Patterson =

Gene Patterson may refer to:

- Eugene Patterson (1923–2013), American journalist and civil rights activist
- Colt Cobra, stage name of Gene Patterson, American professional driver of "Snake Bite"; see Bigfoot
- Gene Patterson, American broadcast news journalist; see WATE-TV

== See also ==
- Patterson (disambiguation)
