= William Pattison =

William Pattison may refer to:

- William Pattison (poet) (1706–1727), English poet
- William Pattison (politician) (1830–1896), Australian politician
- William J. Pattison (1921–1943), US Navy sailor, recipient of the Navy Cross, and namesake of the USS William J. Pattison
- USS William J. Pattison, a United States Navy high-speed transport
- William D. Pattison, American geographer; proposer of the four traditions of geography

== See also ==
- William Pattison Telford (disambiguation)
- William Paterson (disambiguation)
- William Patterson (disambiguation)
