= Dakyns =

Dakyns is a surname. Notable people with the surname include:

- Henry Graham Dakyns (1838–1911), British classicist
- Winifred Dakyns (1875–1960), British naval officer
