= Graziher =

Australian women's periodical

Graziher is an Australian women's magazine, issued six times a year.

Graziher is targeted towards female readers with a strong focus on rural affairs, regional issues and the social aspects relating to life for women who live and work in rural, regional and remote areas of Australia. As an acknowledgement of the publication's targeted demographic, the title of the magazine is an amalgam of the words grazier and her.

Graziher was first published in December 2015.

The magazine's founder Claire Dunne started Graziher from her family's cattle property, sixty kilometres south of Duaringa in Central Queensland.
