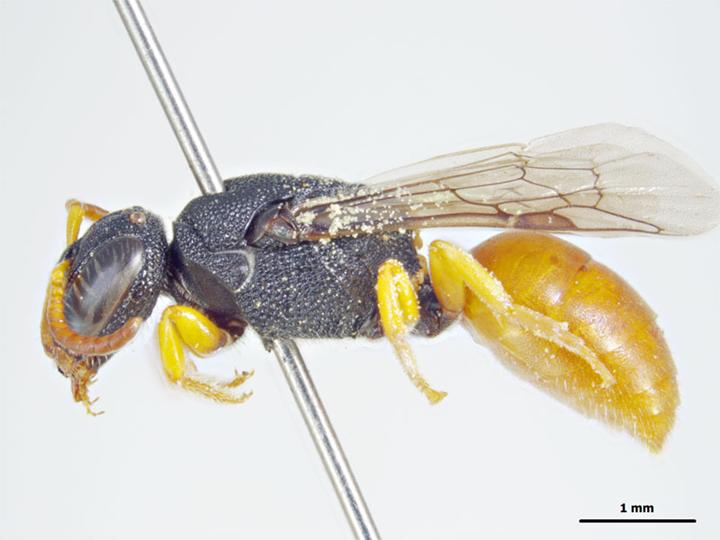
- Female

Scientific classification
- Kingdom: Animalia
- Phylum: Arthropoda
- Clade: Pancrustacea
- Class: Insecta
- Order: Hymenoptera
- Family: Colletidae
- Genus: Hylaeus
- Species: H. maiellus

Binomial name
- Hylaeus maiellus Rayment, 1935

= Hylaeus maiellus =

Species of bee

Hylaeus maiellus, or Hylaeus (Rhodohylaeus) maiellus, is a species of bee in the family Colletidae and subfamily Hylaeinae. It is endemic to Australia. It was described by Australian entomologist Tarlton Rayment in 1935.

== Description ==
Male body length is about 5 mm. Integumental colouration is mainly black and red.

== Distribution and habitat ==
The species occurs in northern, eastern and south-eastern Australia. The type locality is Borroloola in the Northern Territory. Other published localities include Edungalba and Glenmorgan, Queensland, as well as Gunbower in Victoria.

== Behaviour ==
The adults are flying mellivores. Flowering plants visited by the bees include Callistemon and Eucalyptus species.

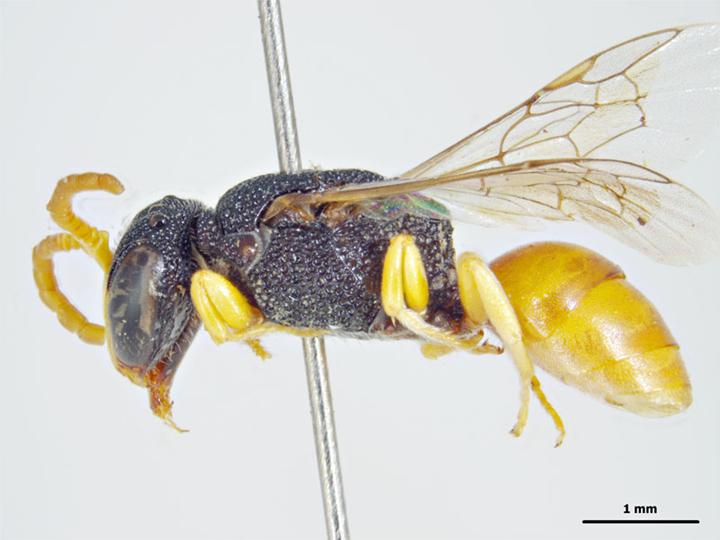
Male
