= William Paterson =

William Paterson or Bill Paterson may refer to:

== Arts and entertainment ==
- William Romaine Paterson (1871–1941), Scottish novelist and poet
- William Paterson (actor) (1919–2003), American actor
- Bill Paterson (actor) (born 1945), Scottish actor
- William Alexander Paterson a.k.a. Bill Alexander, (born 1948), American theatre director

== Business and industry ==
- William Paterson (banker) (1658–1719), Scottish trader, a founder of the Bank of England
- William A. Paterson (1838–1921), American auto manufacturer and Mayor of Flint, Michigan
- William Paterson (trade unionist) (1843–1906), Scottish trade unionist and fire officer

== Law and politics ==
- William Paterson (judge) (1745–1806), United States Founding Father, associate justice of the U.S. Supreme Court, governor of NJ, and signer of the U.S. Constitution
- William Paterson (Michigan politician) (fl. 1860s), mayor of Flint, Michigan
- William Paterson (Canadian politician) (1839–1914), Canadian member of parliament and cabinet minister
- William Paterson (Australian politician) (1847–1920), Australian politician
- Bill Paterson (diplomat), Australian diplomat

== Sports ==
- Willie Paterson (fl. 1913–1928), Scottish footballer
- Bill Paterson (footballer, born 1897) (1897–1970), Scottish footballer
- William Paterson (goalkeeper) (1902–?), Scottish footballer
- William Paterson (wrestler) (1928–2006), Australian Olympic wrestler
- Bill Paterson (footballer, born 1930) (1930–2002), Scottish footballer
- William Paterson (cricketer) (1819–1892), English cricketer and officer in the Indian Civil Service

== Others ==
- William Paterson (explorer) (1755–1810), Scottish soldier, botanist and lieutenant governor of Tasmania
- William Burns Paterson (1849–1915), Scottish horticulturist, founder Alabama State University
- William Paterson Paterson (1860–1939), Scottish minister
- William Dove Paterson (1860–1916), pioneer of cinema in Aberdeen, Scotland
- William Stanley Bryce Paterson a.k.a. Stan Paterson (1924–2013), British glaciologist

== Other uses ==
- William Paterson University, Wayne, New Jersey

== See also ==
- William Patterson (disambiguation)
- William Pattison (disambiguation)
