= Duaringa =

- Town
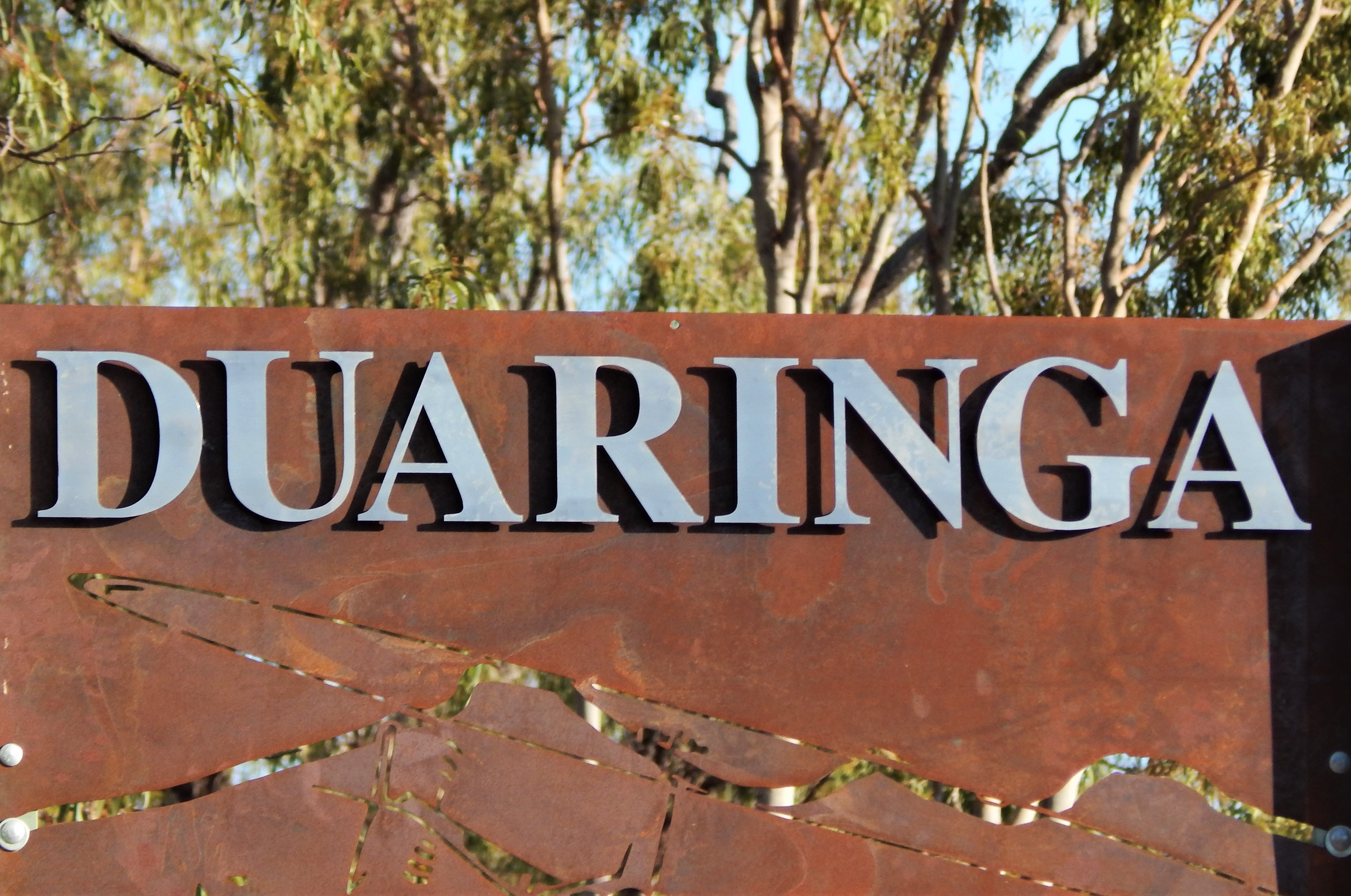
- Duaringa sign on Capricorn Highway

- Interactive map of Duaringa
- Coordinates: 23.7144°S 149.6708°E
- Country: Australia
- State: Queensland
- Region: Central Queensland
- LGAs: Central Highlands Region; Aboriginal Shire of Woorabinda
- Location: 59.2 km (36.8 mi) NNE of Woorabinda; 160 km (99 mi) E of Emerald; 111 km (69 mi) WSW of Rockhampton; 727 km (452 mi) NNW of Brisbane

Government
  - State electorate: Gregory
  - Federal division: Flynn

Area
  - Total: 687.3 km^{2} (265.4 sq mi)

Population
  - Total: 262 (2021 census)
  - Density: 0.3812/km^{2} (0.9873/sq mi)
- Postcode: 4712
Localities around Duaringa
Goowarra	Balcomba	Gogango
Wallaroo	Duaringa	Boolburra
Coomoo	Barnard	Gainsford

Duaringa is a rural town in the Central Highlands Region and a locality split between the Central Highlands Region and the Aboriginal Shire of Woorabinda in Central Queensland, Australia. In the 2021 census, the locality of Duaringa had a population of 262 people.

== Geography ==
Duaringa is on the Capricorn Highway, 116 kilometres (72 mi) west of Rockhampton. The Dawson River forms the eastern boundary of the locality, while the Mackenzie River forms the northern boundary.

The Mackenzie River crossing on Apis Creek Road is approximately 20 kilometres north of the Duaringa township. Motorists are able to use the gravel road to travel through to Marlborough, Queensland but the low level crossing at the Mackenzie River can quickly succumb to river rises during wet weather and heavy rain upstream, closing the road.

The Dawson River, which supplies Duaringa's town water supply, flows to the east of the township. The Capricorn Highway crosses the Dawson River and its anabranch approximately 12 kilometres east of Duaringa. Due to the height of the bridges, only major flooding of the Dawson River closes the highway. Aroona Road, an unsealed road which runs parallel next to the railway line, also provides rural residents with an alternative crossing at a newly built low-level bridge which crosses the Dawson River, 12 kilometres east of Duaringa and seven kilometres downstream from the Capricorn Highway crossing.

The Dawson River and the Mackenzie River both join up north-east of Duaringa to form the Fitzroy River which eventually flows through the city of Rockhampton. A mural depicting the three rivers is painted on the back of the Duaringa Historical & Tourism Information Centre, facing the Capricorn Highway.

== Etymology ==
There are a number of stories relating the origin of the name "Duaringa".

The Queensland Government proclaimed the town reserve on 30 October 1878, an area of 4 square miles (10 km^{2}) which was resumed from the Nundubbermere pastoral run. It believed the name derives from an early pastoral run, believed to be an Aboriginal word, meaning she oak tree. The Queensland Railways Department claimed that the origin of the name for the Duaringa railway station meant oak.

A book that was published by Duaringa Shire Council in 1981 to mark 100 years of local government explored three versions but concluded that no version could be verified with 100% certainty.

The first version published in the book explores the possibility that the word Duaringa originated from the word "djuaringe" possibly used by Aborigines in the traditional Wakawaka or Barunggam languages in southern parts of Queensland. The word "djuaringe" is believed to mean "to turn oneself around" or "to turn into something".

The second and most popular theory is that the town's name is derived from the aboriginal words 'D'warra D'nanjie', meaning a meeting place on the swamp oaks. This is the officially recognised origin of the name Duaringa.

A third version and arguably the most outlandish theory, explored the likelihood of whether the name is linked to a local pioneering family. The book explains that a local well-liked woman named Inga Anderson lived and worked in the Boolburra area. It has been said that the area where she lived was known as "Inga's Place" or "Dear Inga's". It's claimed that her descendants believe that the Railways Department invited Inga to see her name "Dear Inga" painted on the Duaringa Railway Station when it opened in 1876 and somehow was corrupted into the name Duaringa. Anderson went on to marry Moses Wafer of the pioneering Wafer family that settled in the Dingo area.

As Duaringa was being established as a railway town in the 1870s, the settlement was known as either "The Dawson Seven Mile" or "Colo".

In an article in the 27 November 1875 edition of The Capricornian, it was stated that the newspaper understood that the Postmaster-General deemed it undesirable to adopt the name of Colo, as there was already a Colo in New South Wales. The brief article also mentioned that the native name of the area was said to be "Duarininga" but it was considered too lengthy.

On 4 December 1875, The Capricornian reported that "a suitable designation had been found for Colo, alias Seven-mile." The article reported that the native name of Duarininga had been discarded as it was thought to have been too difficult to pronounce, and a "euphonious and expressive" name of Thorn Town had been selected to honour the Postmaster General, George Thorn, who became the 6th Premier of Queensland the following year.

However, in the following week's edition of The Capricornian, the newspaper retracted their previous report which stated the Dawson Seven-mile township would be called Thorntown, instead of Colo. The newspaper explained their announcement was found to have been premature as those who decide such matters had gone on to reverse their original decision and finally decided to officially call the town by its native name, although "slightly contracted" from Duarininga to Duaringa.

Although Colo Post Office opened on 10 November 1875, it was renamed the following month to the town's new name of Duaringa. The Postmaster General's Office placed a newspaper advertisement in several editions of The Rockhampton Bulletin, dated 30 December 1875, advising that the post office would be known as the Duaringa Post Office.

== History ==
Duaringa was close to the northwestern boundaries of the Kangulu, and the eastern frontier of the Kanolu peoples.

=== 1800s ===
Like many towns in the Central Queensland area, Duaringa was first established as a settlement for railway workers during the construction of the Central Western railway line during the 1870s. However, the decision to create a settlement where Duaringa exists today was only determined after a devastating flood in 1875. Prior to the flood, the government had surveyed land where the railway crosses the Dawson River for a major service centre for the railway to be established there. As such, the township of Boolburra was established with many families settling on either side of the river.

The bridge across the Dawson River was almost finished in February 1875 when torrential rain began to fall which continued over several days. The relentless rainfall caused the river to rise rapidly catching many people in Boolburra unaware. In late February, 1875, a series of urgent telegrams began being received in Rockhampton reporting that the whole area was underwater and that many people in Boolburra were stranded on rooftops, in trees and on any high ground they could find.

Upon receiving the news, the superintendent of the railways Robert Ballard set men to work to build punts to rescue people.

When the rescuers arrived, they found thirty residents on the roof of Sheehy's Hotel, while others were stranded on the top of Beattie's Hotel or their own rooftops. Many were suffering from insect bites and severe sunburn. Almost 300 people were rescued from the floodwaters, including four Chinese men who had been without food for five days.

While the loss of life was expected to be substantial, the death toll was much less than first anticipated. Several people did lose their lives, including a German man and his three children, though his wife and their baby were found alive on top of a pile of railway sleepers. The people of Rockhampton began donating items to the Boolburra flood victims including blankets, clothing, loaves of bread, meat and rations.

After the flood, the government decided to abandon their plan to use Boolburra as the major railway centre it was proposed to be, and instead create a separate settlement seven miles further west along the railway line for that purpose. Boolburra then became an ordinary wayside station instead of its original purpose.

The railway line from Boolburra to Duaringa opened on 28 March 1876. A free excursion for people to travel by train from Rockhampton to Duaringa was organised to mark the occasion. Secretary for Public Works, Henry Edward King was among those that made the trip.

Duaringa Provisional School opened on 3 June 1879. It became Duaringa State School on 23 November 1899.

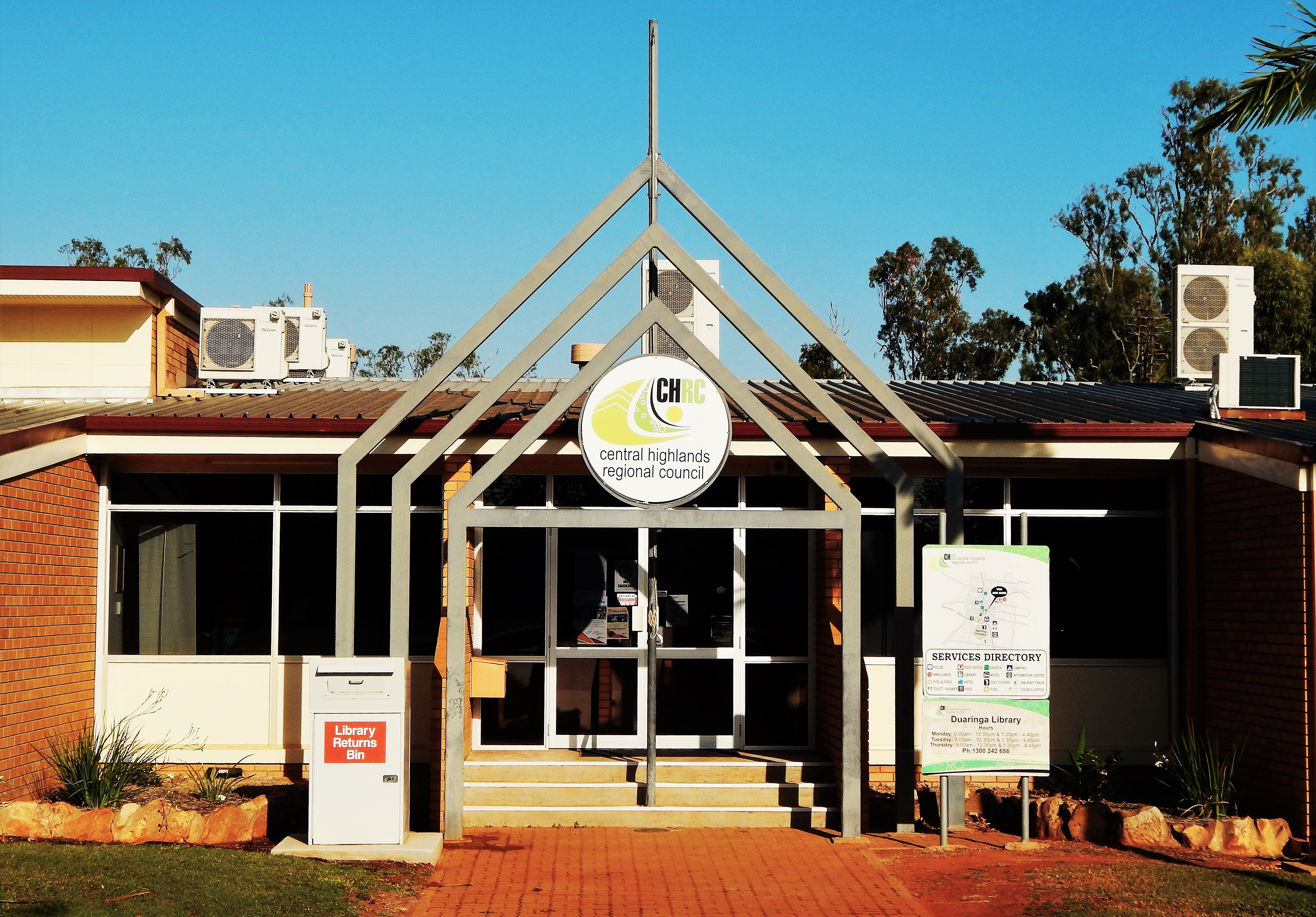
Duaringa council office, 2017

In September 1880, it was decided that the portion of the Banana Division west of the Dawson River should be excised to form a new local government division due to communication difficulties within the Banana Division. As a result, the Duaringa Divisional Board was formed to administer the excised area.

The first meeting of the Duaringa Divisional Board took place on 10 August 1881. Another two meetings took place in 1881 where road repairs, a request to the government for accounting books, a set of by-laws and permission to use the Duaringa Railway Station as a meeting place were among the issues discussed. A rate of sixpence in the pound was levied and sent to all ratepayers in the newly formed division.

Tryphinia Provisional School opened circa 1898 and closed in 1905.

=== 1900s ===
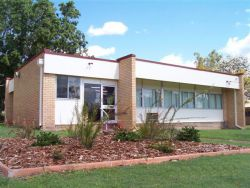
Duaringa Library, 2017

The Duaringa Divisional Board held its last meeting on 11 June 1903 just prior to the name change to Duaringa Shire Council. A council office and residence was built in 1919.

The existing council chambers on the corner of William and Elizabeth Street was officially opened by Minister for Local Government Wallace Rae on 28 November 1970. The construction of a new council library in Elizabeth Street followed, which was opened in October 1977.

Laurinel State School opened on 23 January 1984 and closed on 11 December 1987.

=== 2000s ===
The town served as the administrative centre of the Duaringa Shire Council up until 2008 when the council area was amalgamated into the newly formed Emerald-based Central Highlands Regional Council. The council chambers are still used for administration purposes, and the council remains a major employer for people who live and work in the town.

Apart from farming properties scattered throughout the area, there is nothing of significance remaining at Boolburra that would indicate there was once a thriving township located on the Dawson River. Central Highlands Regional Council continues to maintain and make improvements to the rural road network in the Boolburra area. A new low level bridge has been built across the river to provide quicker access to Duaringa for local property owners in the Boolburra area and a complete bridge replacement was executed across Herbert Creek at Boolburra to re-establish access to the Capricorn Highway.

== Demographics ==
In the 2011 census, the locality of Duaringa had a population of 478 people, while the town of Duaringa had a population of 260 people.

In the 2016 census, the locality of Duaringa had a population of 278 people.

In the 2021 census, the locality of Duaringa had a population of 262 people.

== Heritage listings ==
Heritage-listed sites in Duaringa include:

- Duaringa State School, Charlotte Street (23.7163°S 149.6683°E)

== Attractions and local landmarks ==
=== Mackenzie Park ===
Duaringa's Mackenzie Park is located on the Capricorn Highway at the eastern entrance to the town and is a popular place for travellers to stop.

Due to the park being RV-friendly, Mackenzie Park is especially popular with interstate tourists travelling long-distances in recreational vehicles, who frequently use the area in the north-eastern corner of the park as a temporary campground to utilise the 48 hours of free camping permitted by Central Highlands Regional Council.

The park is anchored by the Duaringa Historical and Tourism Information Centre which is managed by a group of local volunteers who provide tourists with historical information about the local area and attractions in Central Queensland. Some local events are also held at the centre, such as the Duaringa Playgroup's 'Afternoon Tea in the Park' events.

The area also incorporates an amenities block, an artificial waterfall, barbeque facilities, a children's playground, picnic tables and an Anzac cenotaph. Mackenzie Park is home to numerous Lysicarpus trees.

The Duaringa Lioness Club holds weekly "Breakfast in the Park" events at Mackenzie Park's barbeque facility for locals and visitors to the town. The breakfasts are held throughout the cooler months of the year, usually commencing in May and concluding in September. The town's annual Anzac Day service on 25 April takes place at the cenotaph which is located in Mackenzie Park.

=== Duaringa Hotel ===
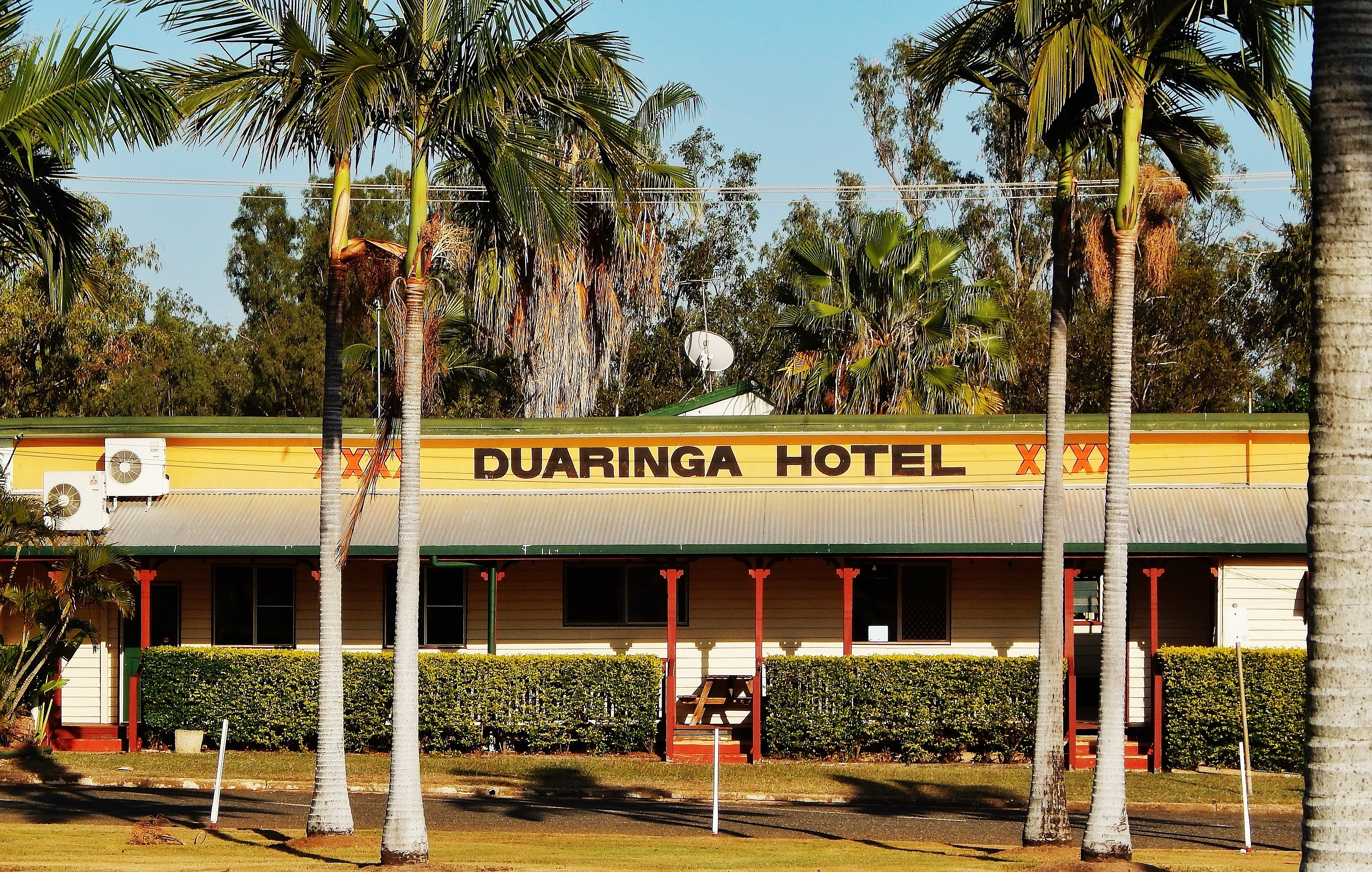
Duaringa Hotel, 2017

Part of the existing Duaringa Hotel in Edward Street was built in 1886 by two brothers, Bill and Peter Diamond.

A provisional liquor license was granted to Peter Diamond in July 1886 before he was granted a full license for the Duaringa Hotel in October 1886.

Peter Diamond later served as chairman of the Duaringa Divisional Board from 1910 until 1912 and again in 1919.

Since the Diamond Brothers established their business in 1886, numerous licensees have managed the hotel and it continues to operate today.

=== Duaringa Picture Theatre ===
The town's old picture theatre is located on the corner of Alice and Edward Streets.

The business was established by local man George Fletcher in 1890, and apart from a picture theatre, Fletcher also ran a general store from the building. Fletcher also rented out the building as a hall for local social events.

The theatre ran for many years, participating in promotions such as "Paramount Week" in 1936, celebrating the 25th anniversary of Paramount Pictures, and showing many films including Phantom of the Opera.

The theatre is now used as a private residence. In 2013, the owner of the building was pictured sitting on the theatre's roof in a photo which was part of a series taken by local Rockhampton radio station ABC Capricornia.

=== QCWA Memorial Hall ===
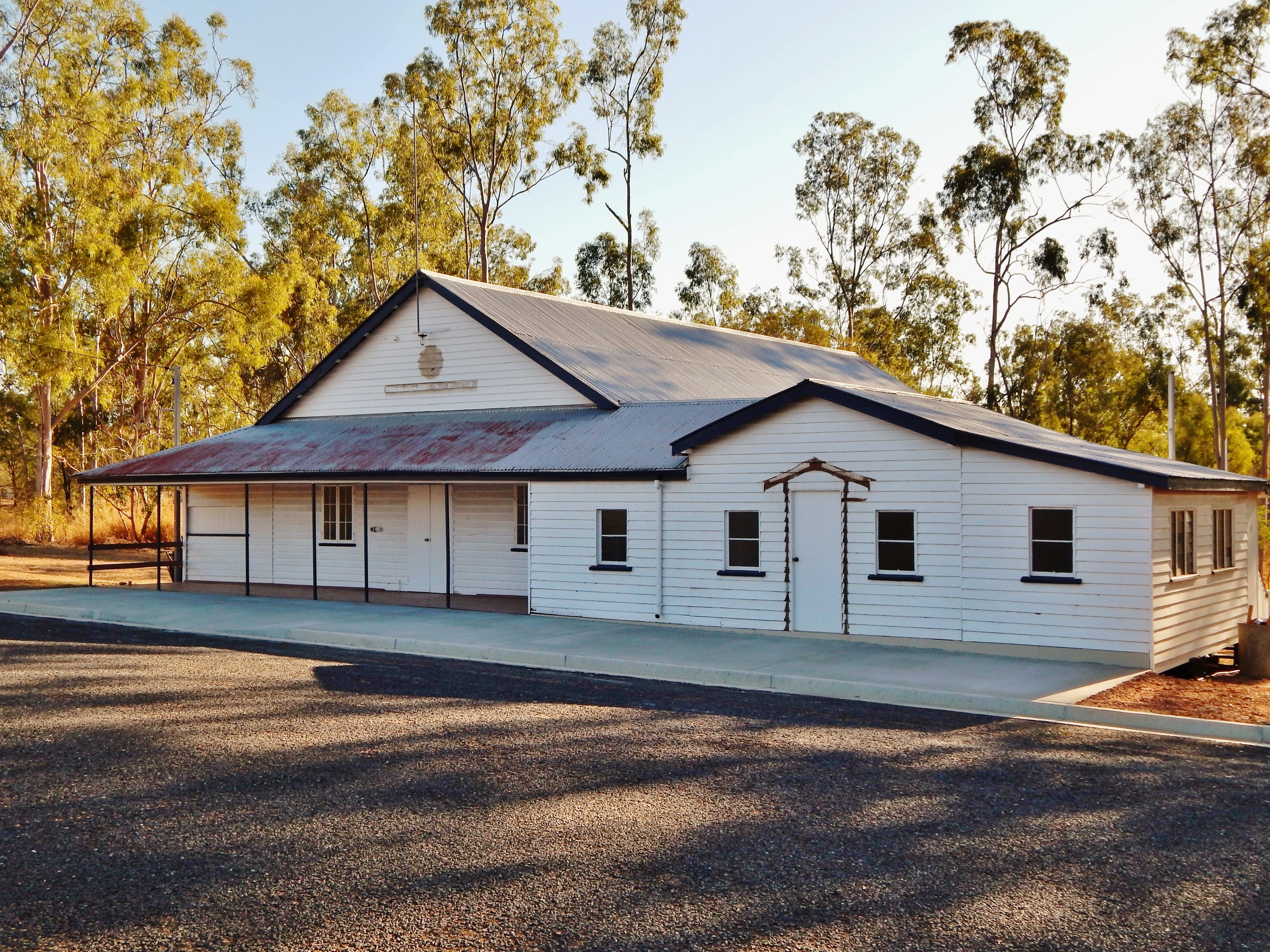
Duaringa Hall September 2017

The QCWA Hall in Edward Street was officially opened on 26 November 1932, six years after a local branch of the Queensland Country Women's Association was established in the town. In 1925, the organiser of the QCWA visited Duaringa with the aim of garnering enough interest to create a local branch. The first meeting was held on 21 September 1925.

After the hall had been opened for a year, Duaringa Shire Council gifted two honour boards bearing the names of local soldiers from the Duaringa area who had enlisted in World War I. The chairperson of the Duaringa Shire Council, Edward Adams conducted the ceremony where the boards were first unveiled. The names on the boards were inscribed by Sidney Porteous from local cattle station Coomooboolaroo.

As the local branch of the QCWA faced dwindling membership and difficulty meeting the expenses associated with maintaining the hall, it was decided to put the venue up for sale in 2014. The building was first offered to Central Highlands Regional Council to buy, but council decided against purchasing the hall.

It was announced in February 2017 that the hall would once again be utilised after being purchased by the Woorabinda Aboriginal Shire Council. The council announced plans to give the Duaringa hall a $132,000 upgrade, enabling it to be used as a cultural centre and museum.

=== Duaringa Post Office ===
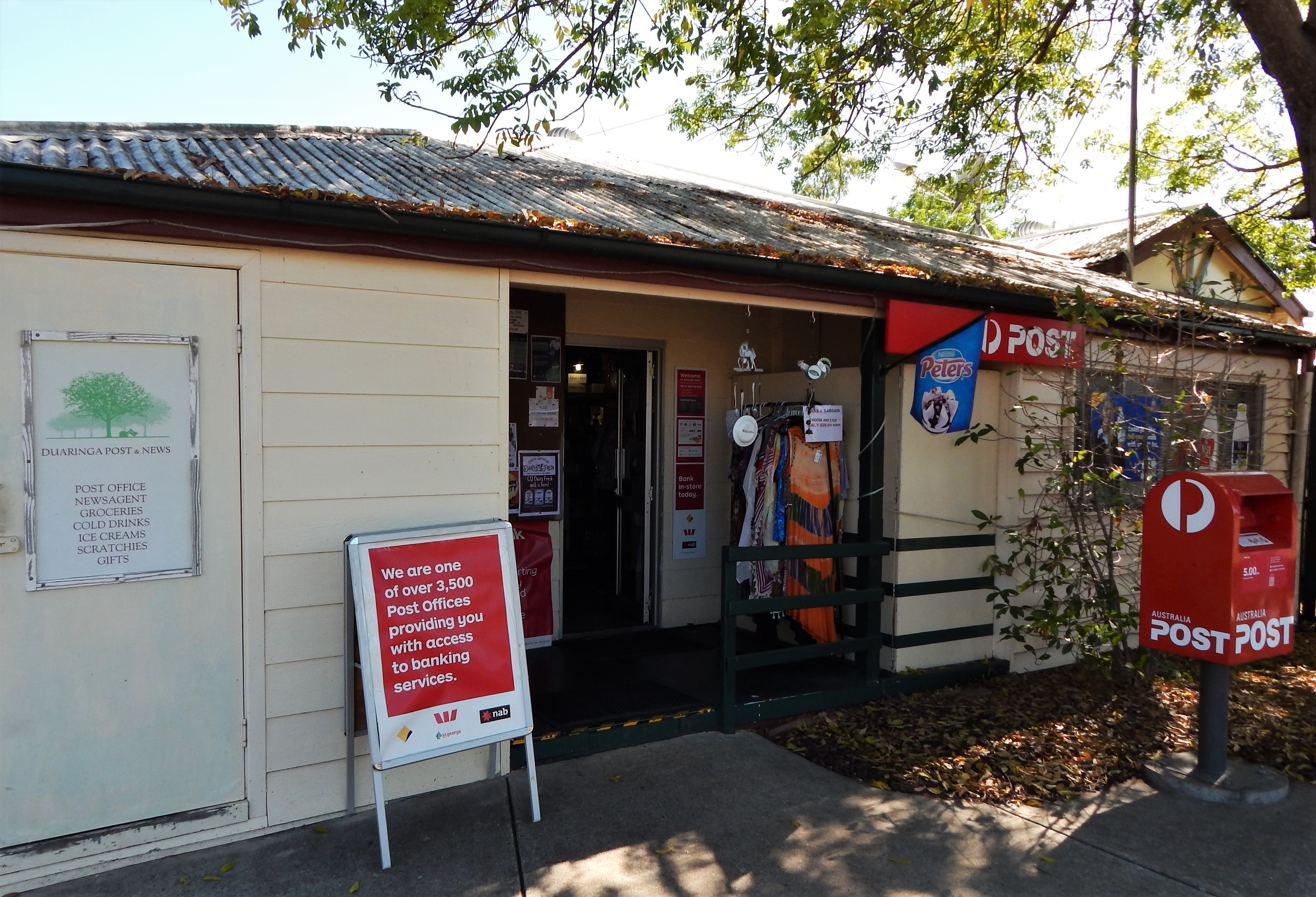
Duaringa Post & News, 2019

The existing post office in Duaringa has been providing the town with postal services from the same building for more than 80 years, opening around 1936.

The first post office to serve the town was the Colo Post Office which opened in November 1875 during a debate on what to call the town. After it was finally decided to call the newly established settlement Duaringa, the Postmaster General's Department advised that from the start of 1876, the post office would be called the Duaringa Post Office.

When postmaster Frank Murray took over the post office in 1934, he moved swiftly to gain approvals to build a new post office on the corner of Alice and William Street. The Postmaster General approved, on the condition Murray provided half the cost for the project.

The new post office and residence were subsequently built and opened in 1936. The Duaringa LPO still operates from the same building today.

In the mid 1990s, the building underwent some minor refurbishments to allow the business to provide additional newsagency-like services and products rather than just postal needs. The business changed its name to Duaringa Post Office & News, as they began selling newspapers, magazines, stationery items, greeting cards and scratch-it tickets as well as a limited array of grocery items.

=== Duaringa Ambulance Centre ===
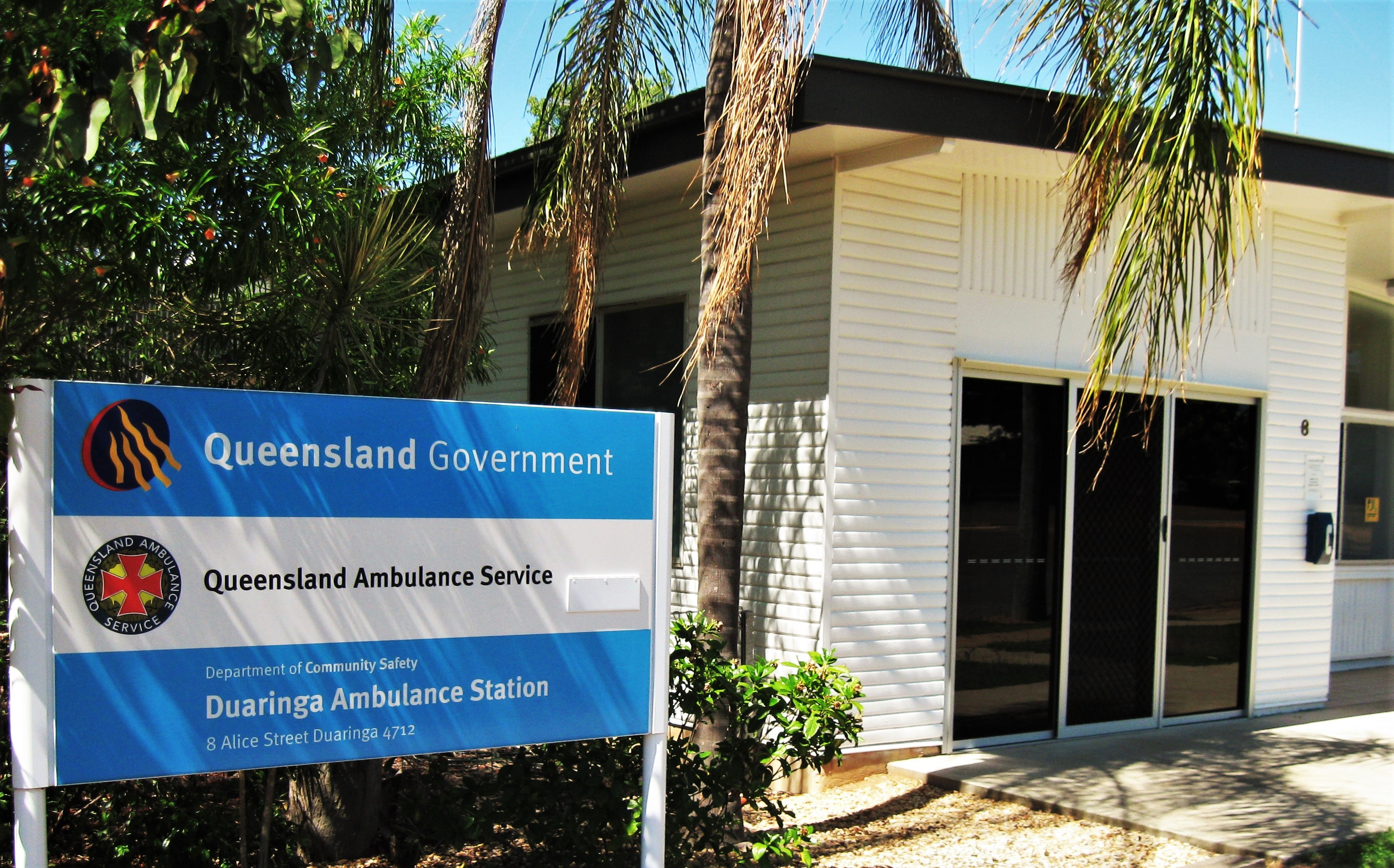
Duaringa Ambulance Station, 2012

The local ambulance station, opened in 1970, is unique in the fact that it was built almost exclusively by voluntary labour performed by local Duaringa residents.

After local postmistress Nancy Andrews donated a substantial parcel of land for the purpose of establishing an ambulance station next to the Duaringa Post Office, the Rockhampton Ambulance Committee engaged the services of architect Edward Hegvold to draw up plans for the proposed building. Once the plans were approved, the voluntary labour commenced construction. Six local residents donated timber, gravel and sand for concreting. Falling, loading, haulage and conversion of the timber was done free of charge. Working bees were held over a number of months which is involved a total of about 80 personnel. 43 people assisted with the foundations and concreting, 30 worked on the carpentry and plumbing, 14 people helped with the painting while two people installed the electrical work.

At the official opening on 30 May 1970, Sir Douglas Fraser said that it must be a proud and happy day for the people of Duaringa. Fraser also said that he felt honoured at opening a building that had been almost completely constructed through voluntary local effort which was a wonderful example of community self-help.

== Education ==
=== Primary ===
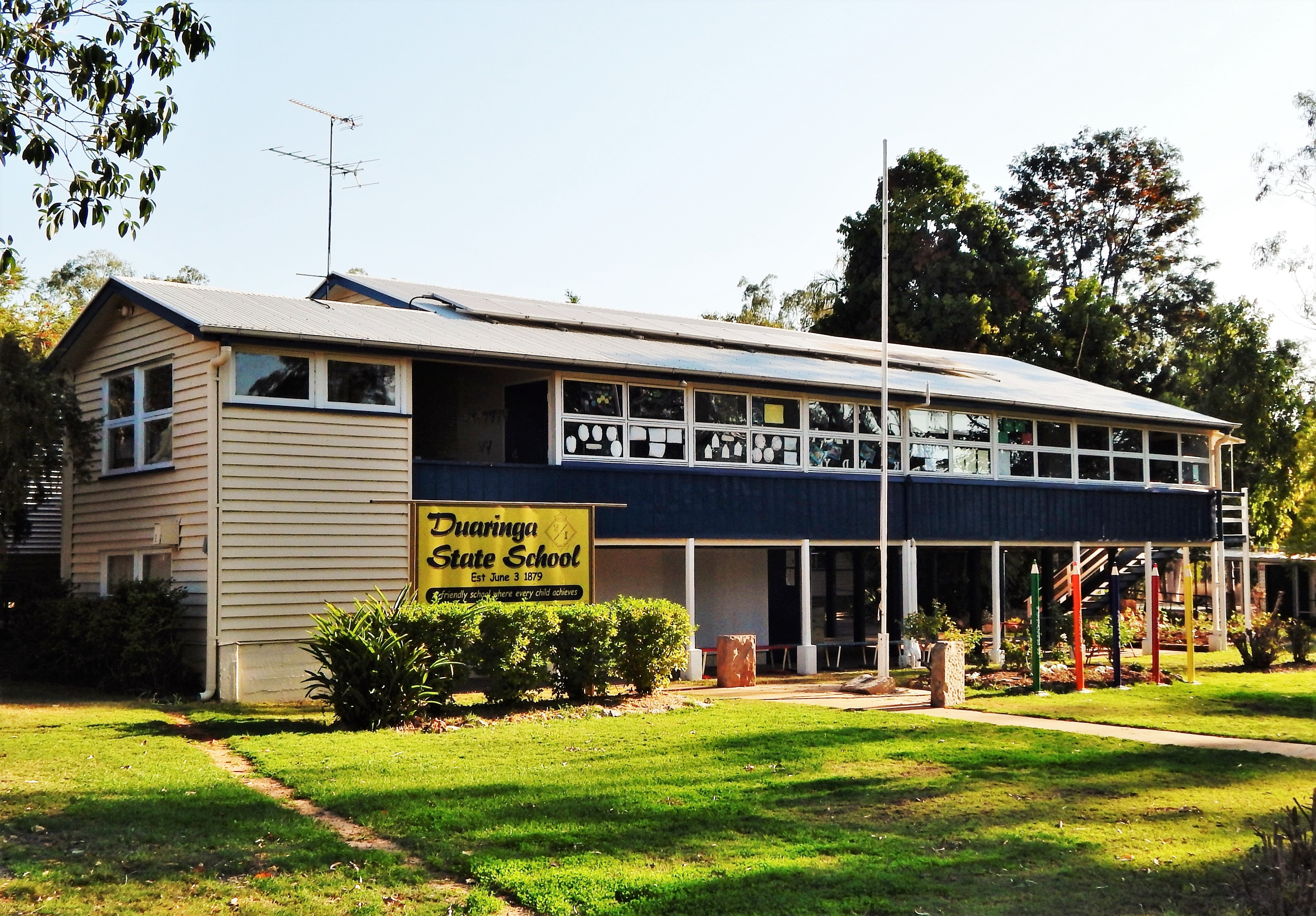
Duaringa State School, 2017

Duaringa State School is a government primary (Prep-6) school for boys and girls at 3 Charlotte Street (23.71590°S 149.66848°E). In 2023, the school had an enrolment of 46 students.

The first school in Duaringa was Duaringa Provincial School which was essentially a 4.8-by-3.7-metre (16 ft × 12 ft) bark hut. It was opened on 3 June 1879 with 17-year-old Mary Ann Simpson as head teacher whose sole education experience consisted of being a monitor at Port Curtis Road State School near Rockhampton for a short period. As her teaching skills grew, Simpson was later transferred to a bigger school and was replaced in 1883 by Kate D'Arcy who had received training in Ireland. At the end of her tenure, D'Arcy was teaching between 50 and 60 students in four classes.

By 1892, Duaringa had grown to such an extent that the residents began calling for a more suitable and permanent facility – a state school. The District School inspector was reluctant and in late 1892, after a building committee for a new school had been formed, advised that he was unsure of whether Duaringa was likely to become a permanent settlement. In spite of this, the department warned that the existing Provincial School was inadequate and warned that if improvements weren't made, the school would be closed. The bark hut was repaired and extended to 7.9 by 5.5 metres (26 by 18 ft) to provide more room for the students and teacher.

By 1898, Duaringa had grown further due to the local timber industry flourishing. The building committee raised sufficient funds and a tender to build the new school building was finally accepted. The new school building was completed by October 1899 and was occupied the next month, meaning Duaringa State School was finally established. Throughout the 20th century, the school continued to grow. Two high set buildings were constructed on either side of the first building allowing more rooms to be added to incorporate additional classrooms, staff rooms, offices and a tuckshop. In 1979, Duaringa State School celebrated its centenary. By then, the school had grown to a four-teacher school with 110 students.

In 1989, a 15-metre swimming pool was added. The school celebrated its 125th anniversary in 2004.

The school's student population fluctuates from year to year. In 2012, the school had 36 children enrolled which decreased to 18 the following year but increased to 27 in 2014. In 2016, the school had 14 students attending.

=== Secondary ===
A daily school bus service operates from Duaringa to Blackwater enabling high school students in Duaringa to attend Blackwater State High School. Alternatively, high school students can choose to attend private boarding schools in Rockhampton or Yeppoon to complete their secondary education.

== Amenities ==
The Central Highlands Regional Council operates a public library at Elizabeth Street.

== Sport and recreation ==
Duaringa has active cricket, golf, social tennis, and rodeo clubs.

=== Cricket ===
The Duaringa Cricket Club uses the Duaringa Cricket Ground for local competitions and charity events such as the McGrath Foundation's Pink Stumps Day which was held in Duaringa on 19 November 2016.

=== Golf ===
Duaring Golf Club's nine-hole golf course is located on the southern side of the Capricorn Highway in the Duaringa township and is used by local members as well as for charity events. The Duaringa Golf Club operates a clubhouse which is part of the Duaringa Sports Complex.

=== Campdrafts and Bullaramas ===
Duaringa Rodeo Club hosts Australian Campdraft Affiliated Campdraft campdrafting events in Duaringa, while the Central Rodeo Cowboys Association holds "Bullarama" events at the town's sports complex each year.

=== Horse racing ===
The town previously had an active horse racing club which organised local race meetings. The first annual race meeting in Duaringa was held on 26 May 1883.

A restructure of horse racing in regional Queensland in 2002, which included the number of race meetings throughout Queensland being reduced, led to the club's demise. The old race track and horse racing infrastructure such as stables and barriers are still visible at the Duaringa Sports Complex. About 1000 racegoers attended the Duaringa Races in 1995. Australian rugby league player Allan Langer was a special guest at the 1996 Duaringa Races, which was a fundraising event for the Royal Flying Doctor Service of Australia. More than $10,000 was raised at the event.

== Religion ==
Duaringa has two churches; until December 2015, it had three.

=== St Michael and All Angels Anglican Church (closed) ===
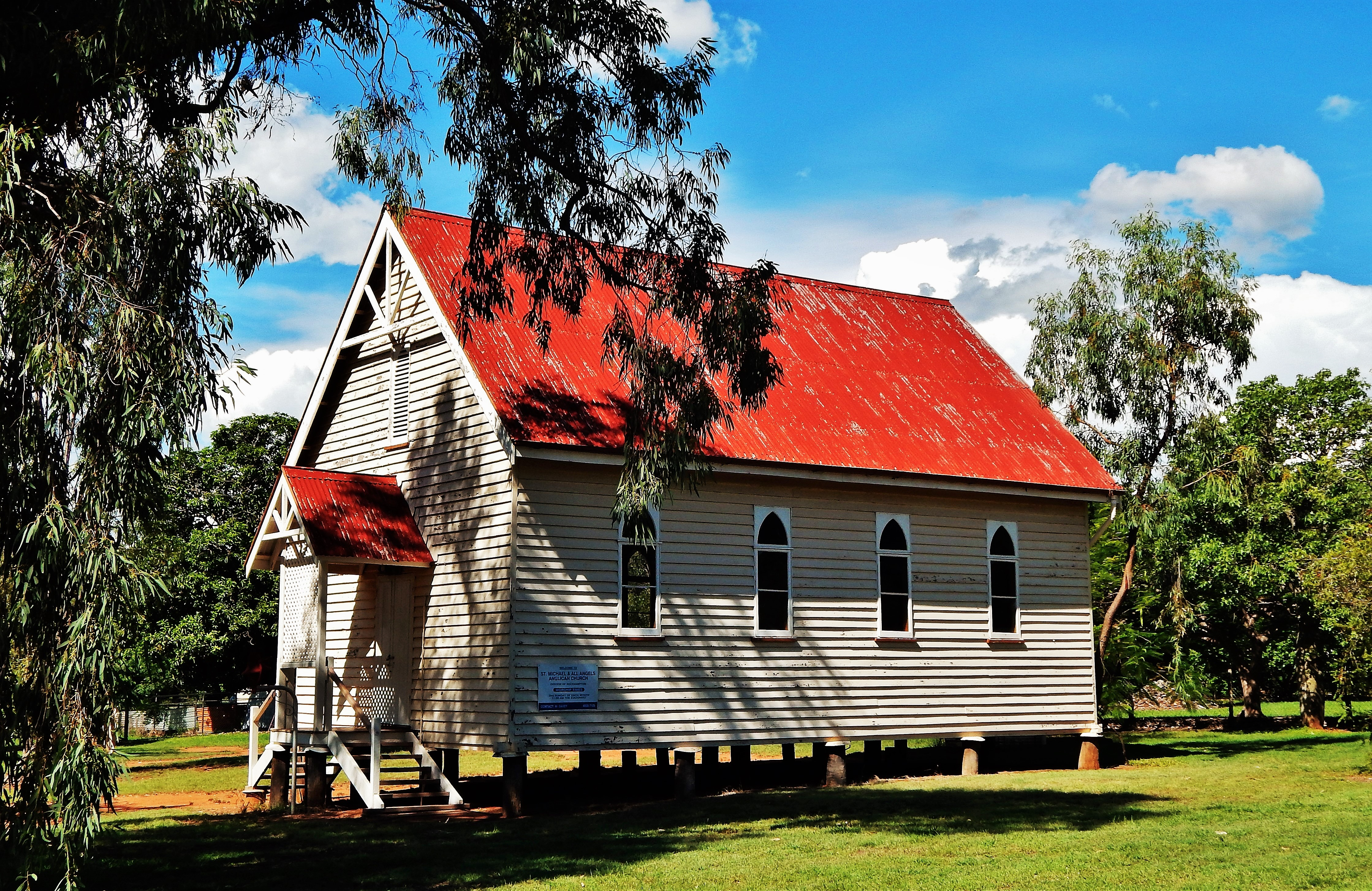
Duaringa Anglican Church, 2015

On Michaelmas Day in October 1904, the St Michael and All Angels Anglican Church was dedicated by Bishop Nathaniel Dawes. From 1904 until 2015, the church remained relatively unchanged in its location in Elizabeth Street opposite the Duaringa Library. However, when Duaringa was hit with a severe storm in November 2015, strong winds blew the church off its stumps causing extensive damage. The church was beyond repair and it was removed. Anglican services are now held at St Kevin's Roman Catholic Church.

=== St Kevin's Roman Catholic Church ===
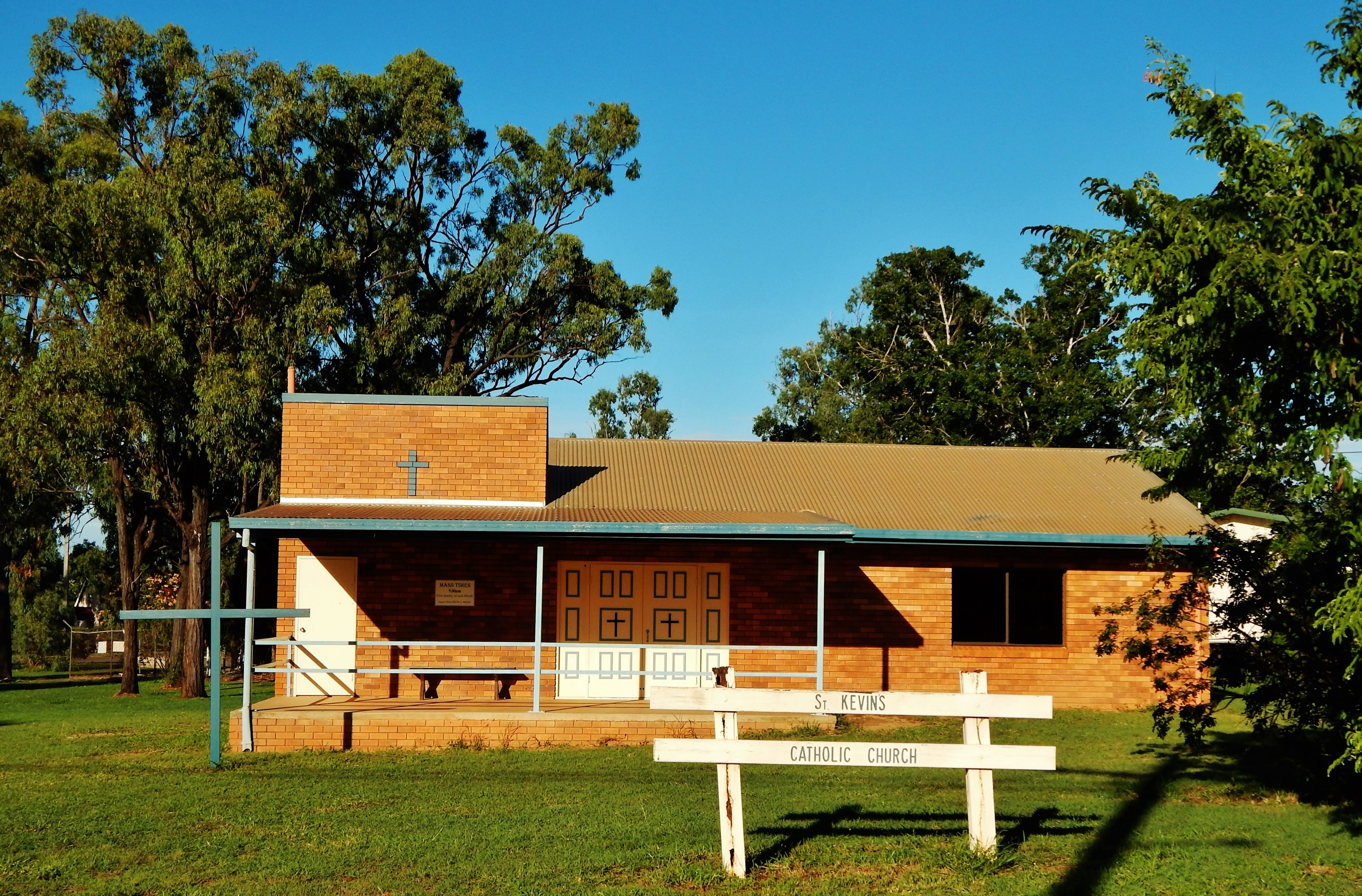
Duaringa Catholic Church, 2015

St Kevin's Roman Catholic Church was opened in Duaringa in September 1902 by Bishop Joseph Higgins. It was later replaced with a more modern low-set brick building on the corner of Edward and Mary Street in 1985. Anglican services are also now held in this church following the destruction of St Michael and All Angels Church during a storm in November 2015.

=== Uniting Church ===
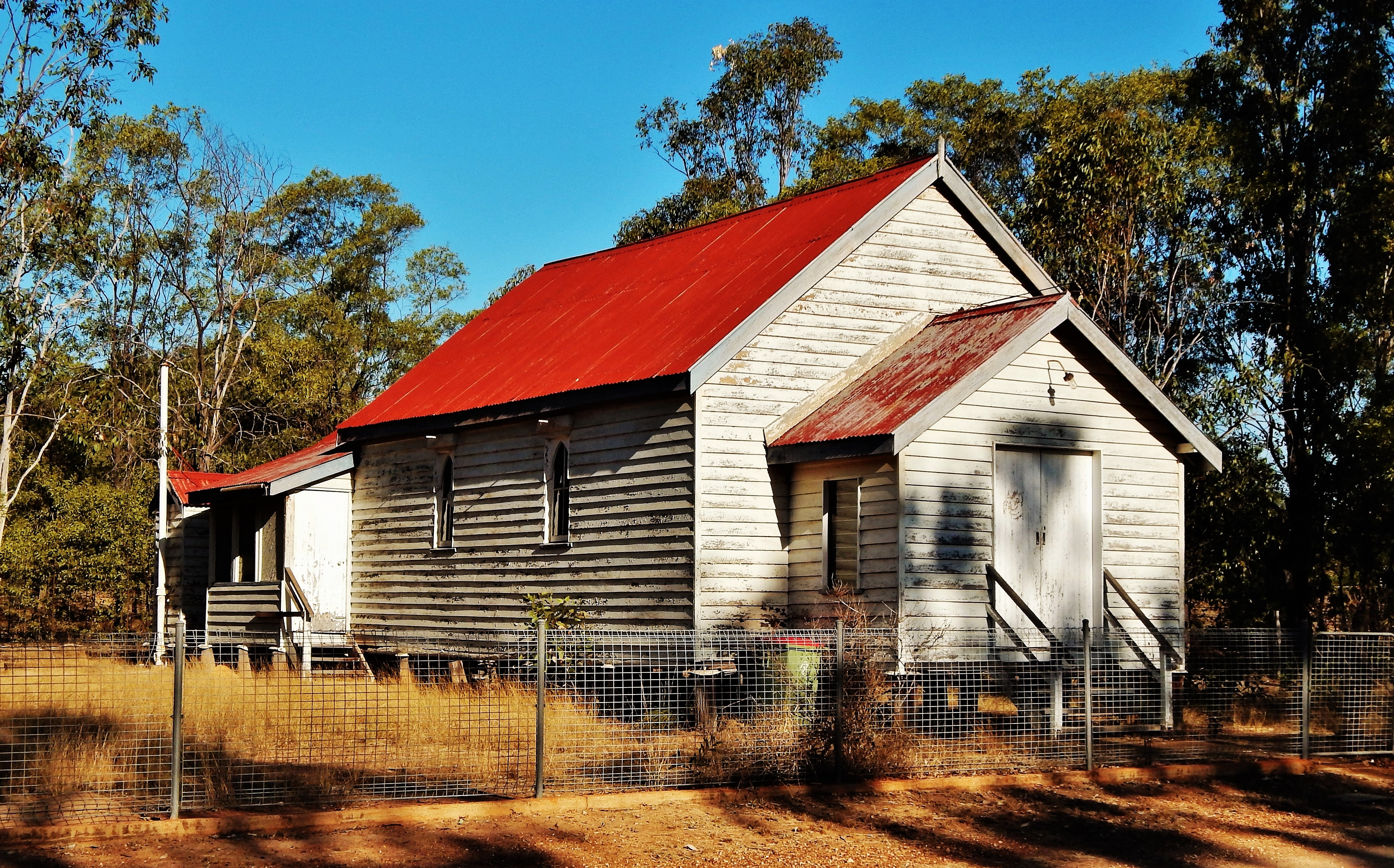
Duaringa Uniting Church, 2017

Duaringa's Uniting Church in Edward Street at the northern entrance to the township is no longer used for regular services, although it is still used for an occasional funeral or wedding. The timber church was first opened in December 1907 as the Methodist Church. It became the Uniting Church when the union of Presbyterian, Congregational and Methodist churches took place nationally.

== Military history ==
=== Local WWI and WWII enlistments ===
A plaque located at the town's cenotaph in Mackenzie Park lists 66 names of locals who served in World War I and 99 names of locals who served during World War II. Eighteen of those listed were killed, or believed killed, in action during the two conflicts.

Among the World War I service personnel listed at the cenotaph are Percy Laver and Henry Laver, uncles to Australian tennis player Rod Laver whose family lived in the local area. Henry Laver was killed in action on 12 July 1917 aged 34.

Another noteworthy soldier from Duaringa was Corporal Vincent (Bill) Anderson who became known for capturing an anti-tank gun with only a spade and a rifle during World War II. The gallantry of Anderson and other Queenslanders was acknowledged in communication dispatches for good work, including advancing two miles into enemy territory, where they remained for four hours before returning with a number of German prisoners. Anderson was awarded a Distinguished Conduct Medal for his bravery.

=== Camp Wallaroo ===
Camp Wallaroo was an American training camp and ordnance dump established during World War II, situated in the Duaringa State Forest, north of the former small settlement of Wallaroo, ten kilometres east of Duaringa.

The camp was established soon after the land was acquired in July 1942. The last unit of occupation was African-American unit, the 636 Ordnance Company. All areas at Camp Wallaroo were vacated by 1 January 1944.

During its existence, the camp consisted of a campsite, motor pool, mess kitchen, bathhouse, recreational building, administration office, water tanks, latrines and a watch tower. Construction of the camp was undertaken by the Public Works Department, builder Robert Leonard Schofield and troop labour.

Camp Wallaroo was one of a number of American training camps in the Central Queensland area during World War II including Camp Rockhampton, Camp Caves, Camp Nerimbera, Camp Thompson's Point, Camp Keppel Sands and Camp Yeppoon.

It is believed one soldier walked to Duaringa to see a girlfriend every time he had recreational leave, before walking back to camp.

== Indigenous culture ==
The traditional owners of the land in the Duaringa district are the Gangulu people, and the local area is believed to be a significant centre for Aboriginal peoples. In the 2011 census, Aboriginal and Torres Strait Islander people made up 11.1% of the people counted in the Duaringa district. Duaringa is located 60 kilometres north of the Aboriginal community of Woorabinda, where there was a former reservation. Indigenous people were granted small parcels of land in the Duaringa area under Queensland native title legislation. There are Aboriginal rock art sites at Blackdown Tableland National Park, south-west of Duaringa.

== 1968 Railway collision and aftermath ==
At 8:18 pm on 7 November 1968, a coal train and a passenger-goods train collided at Duaringa, killing the coal train's driver and his fireman. The assistant station master, 23-year-old David Dunnett, who was on duty at the time of the collision, was charged with unlawfully killing the driver of the coal train and a date was set for a trial at the Rockhampton Supreme Court, which was due to begin on 3 March 1969.

On the eve of a manslaughter trial, 48-year-old station master Royce Joseph Stickens murdered his 41-year-old wife Audrey and two young children before committing suicide.

The bodies of Royce Stickens, his wife, their 12-year-old son and 11-year-old daughter were found by a local police sergeant who had called around the morning before the trial to remind Stickens that he was due to give evidence at the trial the following day. The body of Royce Stickens was found with an automatic rifle beside it, indicating that a murder-suicide had taken place, possibly connected to the fatal railway accident.

NB: Some media incorrectly reported the station master’s surname as Strickens, instead of correctly referring to it as Stickens.

== 1996 Satellite city proposal ==
In October 1996, investors and representatives from South Korean religious group Canaan Farmers met with local government representatives in Duaringa to outline plans to build a satellite city on the eastern outskirts of the Duaringa township. Originally reported to cost $30 million, it was later touted as a $230 million international village which would have housed 1500 people, and would have included a shopping centre, hotel, golf course, an international school, a church and an industrial area and a noodle factory. On the day the original plans were unveiled to the public, the development co-ordinator for the village told local media that the satellite city was the brainchild of South Korean spiritual leader, Reverend Jong-Il Kim who had the intention of promoting international goodwill.

Duaringa Shire mayor Tom Hall accepted an offer in November 1996 to visit South Korean to publicise the Duaringa Shire in the hope of securing the international city.

In December 1996, it was reported that the Korean investors were considering situating the satellite city at Blackwater, 85 kilometres west of Duaringa, because Blackwater already had many facilities in place. However, attention shifted back to Duaringa when the original $30 million proposal was upgraded by the investors to a new $230 million investment. Copies of the new plans were sent to Duaringa Shire Council and the Department of Tourism, Small Business and Industry.

In January 1997, a group of 30 Korean business people visited Duaringa to further discuss their plans for the satellite city. Mayor Tom Hall said that Duaringa Shire Council fully supported the development and that he hoped the city would be operational by 1998. It was reported that the project depended on the construction of a water storage facility on the Dawson River.

In August 2001, it was reported that problems with land entitlements in Duaringa and political upheaval in Korea had prevented the satellite city from going ahead. However, a delegation of Chinese business executives including China Delong Group general manager Zhang Yongde were planning to visit Duaringa on 11 September 2001 to inspect land and infrastructure. They had indicated to Duaringa Shire Council that they were interested in a possible major development for the town, and had requested copies of the original proposal put forward by the South Koreans in 1996 which had failed to get off the ground.

== Media ==
Duaringa is home to Graziher, an independent national rural magazine which is published quarterly and is aimed at women who live and work in rural areas of Australia. The magazine's editor compiles the magazine from her family's cattle property near Duaringa, where she lives.

Like much of Central Queensland, Duaringa mainly receives traditional local media services such as newspapers, radio and television from Rockhampton.

== Popular culture ==
In 2004, Australian country music performer Melinda Schneider filmed parts of the music video for her song "Real People" in Duaringa and other parts of Central Queensland, including Rockhampton.

Schneider indirectly refers to Duaringa in the first line of the song by singing: At a roadhouse an hour out of Rocky..., before she sings about a conversation she had with an employee at the local service station, who also features in the film clip.

Real People was awarded the APRA Song of the Year at the 33rd CMAA Awards in Tamworth in 2005.

== Notable residents ==
- George Barnard, Harry Barnard, Charles Barnard, Wilfred Barnard, Mabel Barnard and Ernest Barnard, Australian zoologists and naturalists. The Barnard family moved to local property Coomooboolaroo, south of Duaringa, in 1873. The patriarch of the family, George Barnard, built a collection of insect and bird eggs and specialised in moths, butterflies and beetles. George's wife Maria was an artist who drew specimens. George's collection grew so large that a private museum was built on the cattle station. Upon his death, George Barnard's collection was acquired by Walter Rothschild, 2nd Baron Rothschild's Natural History Museum at Tring but his children continued similar work, making names for themselves with their own achievements. The Barnard property hosted many internationally renowned naturalists and zoologists including Albert Stewart Meek, and Carl Sofus Lumholtz. Charles and Harry Barnard both served as chairmen on the Duaringa Divisional Board at various times.
- Vince Lester, Australian politician. Lester hitchhiked to Duaringa in 1962 to take over the Duaringa Bakery. Lester has claimed he only had enough money to put down a deposit on the business and that the first six months were difficult but made the business a success with the support of the people of Duaringa.
