= John Patteson =

John Patteson may refer to:

- John Patteson (bishop) (1827–1871), Anglican bishop and martyr
- John Patteson (1755–1833), English Tory politician, Member of Parliament (MP) for Minehead 1802–1806, and for Norwich 1806–1812
- John Patteson (judge) (1790–1861), English judge

== See also ==
- John Pattison (disambiguation)
