= George Pattinson (footballer) =

Australian rules footballer, born 1914

Personal information
- Full name: George Frederick William Pattinson
- Born: 6 May 1914; Rochester, Victoria
- Died: 5 November 2003 (aged 89)
- Original team: Narrandera
- Height: 185 cm (6 ft 1 in)
- Weight: 86 kg (190 lb)
- Position: Half forward / Half back / Ruck

Playing career^{1}
Years	Club	Games (Goals)
1934–37, 1939–40, 1942	Essendon	67 (17)
1941	Williamstown (VFA)	10 (2)
- ^{1} Playing statistics correct to the end of 1942.

George Frederick William Pattinson (6 May 1914 – 5 November 2003) was an Australian rules footballer who played with Essendon in the Victorian Football League (VFL).

Pattinson spent the 1941 season at Williamstown in the VFA, playing 10 games and kicking 2 goals and being awarded the best utility trophy in his only season with 'Town before the Association went into recess due to the Second World War. Pattinson returned to the Bombers in 1942.

The son of St Kilda player Artie Pattinson, George Pattinson later served in the Royal Australian Air Force from 1943 until 1947.
