= James Grant Pattison =

Australian journalist and author

James Grant Pattison (28 January 1862 – 6 July 1946) was an Australian journalist and author, known for writing under the pseudonym of "Battler".

== Early life ==
Pattison was born in Hawthorn, Victoria on 28 January 1862 to Australian businessman and politician William Pattison and his wife Helen Margaret Pattison (née Grant).

The family relocated to Rockhampton, Queensland in early 1865. Pattison's mother Helen died in 1877. Pattison claimed his strict father's remarriage to Susan Stephenson during his adolescence contributed to his own rebellious behaviour and his decision to leave home as a teenager.

As a young man, Pattison had a strong interest in horses and spent much of his recreational time participating in horse racing, hurdle jumping and polo. At one time, Pattison was associated with Charlie Brown, the owner of racehorse Megaphone. Pattison turned down the offer of a half-interest in Megaphone which went on to have considerable success until the horse was badly injured in a fall in the 1891 Melbourne Cup.

== Marriage ==
Pattison married popular Rockhampton singer, Margaret Murphy, known locally as "The Flower Queen", at St Paul's Cathedral in Rockhampton on 2 April 1885. Murphy was the daughter of local publican Thomas Murphy, the licensee of the "On Stanley, On" Hotel in East Street, later known as the Post Office Hotel.

== Working life ==
After his marriage, Pattison acquired a part-share in four local grazing properties. However, a tick plague in the late 1890s and the Federation Drought in the early 1900s forced Pattison to take any available work. Therefore, he qualified as an engine driver, learnt to bore wells, and became a bookkeeper on a cattle station near Normanton, Queensland.

It was while he was a bookkeeper in Townsville, he began to experiment in professional writing, by contributing stock paragraphs for newspapers in Townsville. While in North Queensland, Pattison accepted a position as a cattle buyer for the Merinda Meatworks near Bowen, Queensland. While he enjoyed his working life in the north, the effects of rheumatism prompted him to return to Rockhampton where he expanded his writing experience by beginning to write a nostalgia column called Early Days for The Evening News and The Artesian.

Pattison then secured work with The Morning Bulletin and The Capricornian as a travelling rural reporter in the 1920s, beginning a series called On The Track in 1923, where he would find stories by driving a horse sulky to remote properties in the Rockhampton district. Pattison claimed that throughout his travels his clothes would become ripped from climbing through barbed wire fences and he would become hungry enough to actually enjoy curried bandicoot.

After acquiring a motor vehicle, Pattison would travel further west enabling the western districts of Central Queensland to feature more prominently in the On The Track series.

Pattison continued writing as a freelancer in his retirement, regularly contributing articles to The Pastoral Gazette, Brisbane Courier, The Queenslander and The Australian.

== Battler's Tales ==
After moving to Brisbane in 1935, Pattison compiled his published articles into a book entitled Battler's Tales of Early Rockhampton which was published in 1939.

In a review of Pattison's book, The Courier-Mail said that Pattison knows his subject and he had managed to find a way to write history that is both revealing and convincing. The reviewer also stated that the book's chief quality was the human interest and the anecdotal method Pattison employed, written as if he was telling a friend. The reviewer also added that although the book might be dismissed as rough and crude from an artistic standpoint, Pattison was able to make the subject lively.

== Death ==
Pattison died in Wilston, Queensland on 6 July 1946.

== Legacy ==
In 2004, the Central Queensland Family History Association released On The Track featuring Pattison's work from the newspaper series.

In 2016, local Central Queensland publishing house Coorooman Press chose Pattison's book, Battler's Tales of Early Rockhampton as the first in a series of historical publications to be republished, which also included The Early History of Rockhampton written by J. T. S. Bird in 1904, and The Moving Mind, written by Lorna McDonald in 1985.
