= Duaringa State School =

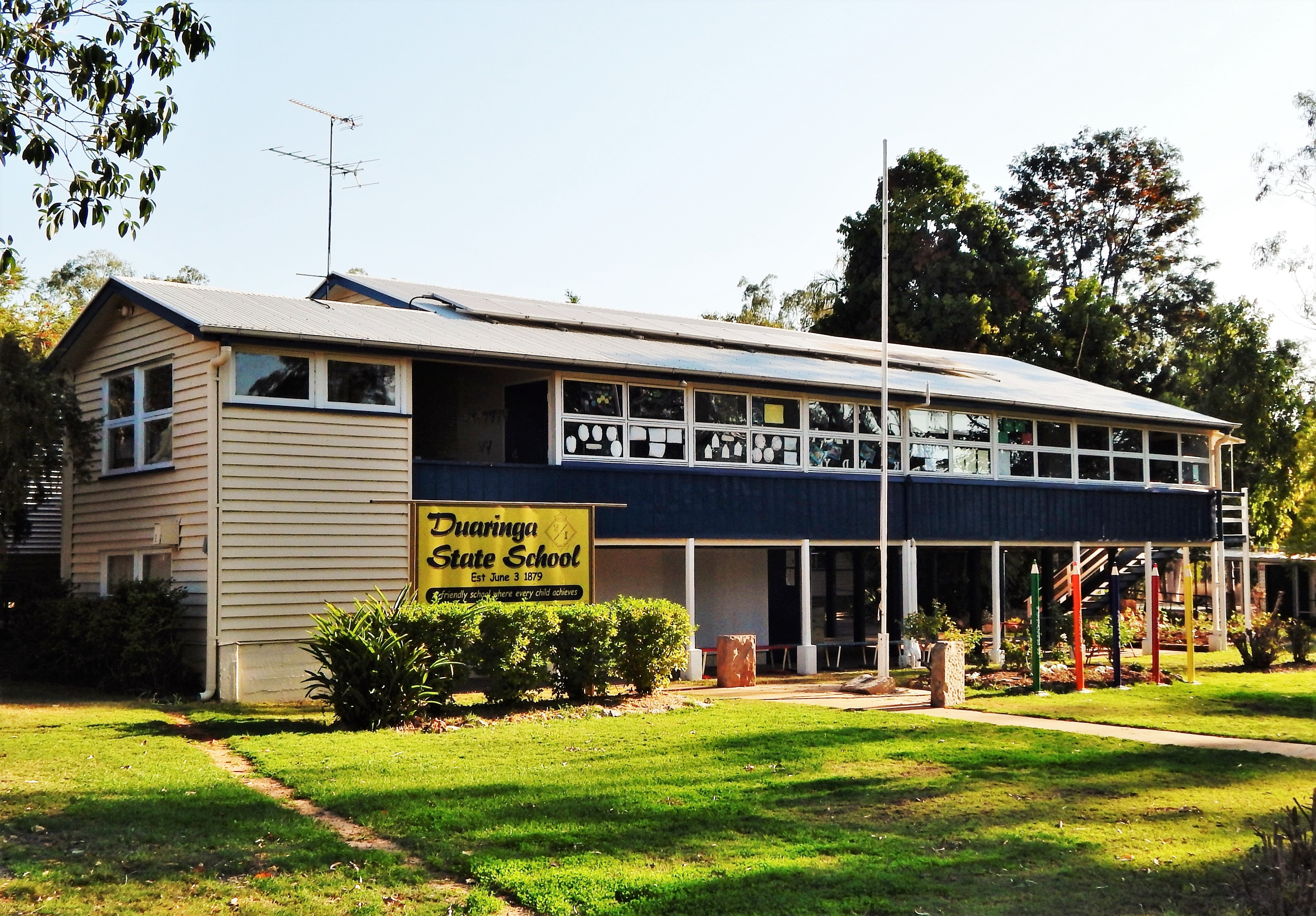
- Duaringa State School, 2017

- Location within Queensland
- 23.7163°S 149.6683°E
- Location: Charlotte Street, Duaringa, Central Highlands Region, Queensland, Australia

History
- Design period: 1870s–1890s (Late 19th century)
- Built: 1899–1934, 1899

Queensland Heritage Register
- Official name: Duaringa State School
- Type: state heritage
- Designated: 31 May 2019
- Reference no.: 650097
- Type: Education, Research, Scientific Facility: Accommodation – teacher's residence; Education, research, scientific facility: School-state
- Theme: Educating Queenslanders: Providing primary schooling
- Builders: JC Thomson

Duaringa State School is a heritage-listed state school and teacher's residence at Charlotte Street, Duaringa, Central Highlands Region, Queensland, Australia. It was built from 1899 to 1934 by JC Thomson. It was added to the Queensland Heritage Register on 31 May 2019.

== History ==
Duaringa State School, which opened on its current site in 1899, is located in the small town of Duaringa, approximately 90 kilometres (56 mi) southwest of Rockhampton. The school is important in demonstrating the evolution of state education and its associated architecture, as it retains an early Department of Public Works (DPW) timber school building (Block A, 1899), with a contemporary large DPW teacher's residence (1899), set on a large site with an early tree planting, play areas and sporting facilities.

Part of the traditional land of the Gaangalu people, the town of Duaringa was surveyed during the summer of 1875–6 as part of the westward extension of the Central Western railway line (originally called the "Great Northern Railway"), which had opened from Rockhampton to Westwood in 1867. Duaringa, previously known as "Colo" or the "Dawson Seven-mile Camp", was settled by Europeans in the 1860s as it was at the junction of two roads. Prior to that it had been a meeting place and a burial ground for the Gaangalu people. After a flood in early 1875 inundated the railway construction town of Boolburra, on the east bank of the Dawson River, the population relocated 7 miles (11 km) west to the Dawson Seven-mile Camp. This was surveyed and renamed Duaringa. When the railway opened to Duaringa on 28 March 1876, the town became the railhead for local wool shipments. A town reserve of 4 square miles (10 km^{2}) resumed from the Nundubbermere pastoral run, was declared on 30 October 1878. After the railhead moved west, Duaringa survived due to the local pastoral and timber industries, and was the administration centre for the Duaringa Shire Council. The Colo Post Office, opened on 10 November 1875, was renamed the Duaringa Post Office from the start of 1876.

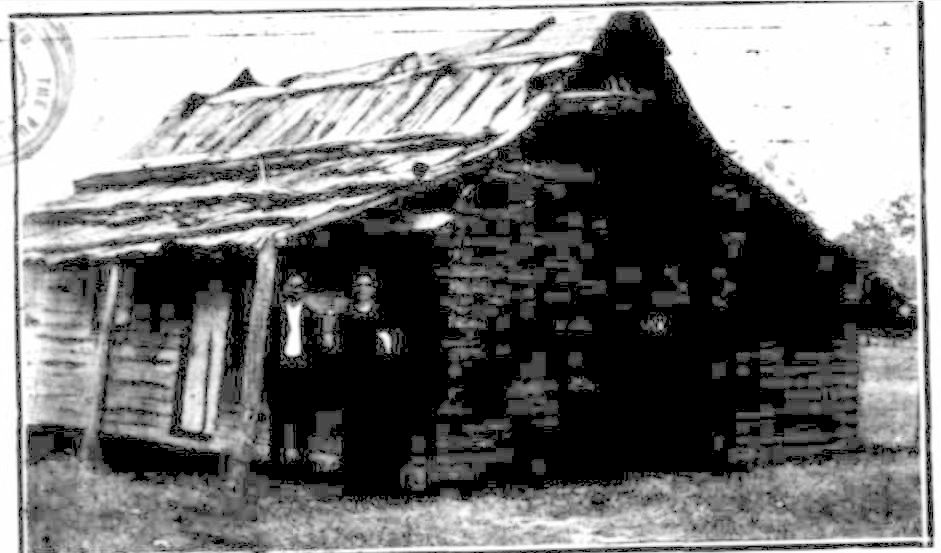
Duaringa Provisional School

A provisional school opened at Duaringa on 3 June 1879, in a slab hut with a bark roof, on a site north of the railway which had previously been rejected as a school reserve. The establishment of schools was considered an essential step in the development of new communities and integral to their success. Schools became a community focus, a symbol of progress, and a source of pride, with enduring connections formed with past pupils, parents, and teachers. However, in 1892 the Duaringa provisional school was referred to as "a wretched tenement", with 30–40 children in a building meant for 25. Although a building committee for a state school was formed in October that year, concerns about Duaringa's permanence meant that an application for a state school was deferred, and instead the provisional school building was extended.

Following increased confidence in the future of the town, in October 1898 a committee was elected to raise funds for the state school. In May 1899 the tender of JC Thomson, of £869 for a new school building and residence, was accepted. The school's site was east of Edward Street and south of Charlotte Street. The site had originally been gazetted as a square, 2.5 acres (1.0 ha) reserve for a school in August 1877. The state school reserve was originally owned by the Railway Department, and included the house of an Inspector near the corner of Edward and Elizabeth Streets. This reserve was extended twice during 1893, to a total of 5 acres (2.0 ha), the whole of Section IX between Edward and George streets. The local community produced the required one-fifth of the building cost, and the new state school was completed in October 1899 and occupied the next month. The front verandahs of both new buildings faced north, towards Charlotte Street.

To help ensure consistency and economy, the Queensland Government developed standard plans for its school buildings. From the 1860s until the 1960s, Queensland school buildings were predominantly timber-framed, an easy and cost-effective approach that also enabled the government to provide facilities in remote areas. Standard designs were continually refined in response to changing needs and educational philosophy and Queensland school buildings were particularly innovative in climate control, lighting, and ventilation.

The school building at Duaringa (known as Block A in 2019) was an early DPW timber school building. From 1893 the DPW greatly improved the natural ventilation and lighting of classroom interiors, experimenting with different combinations of roof ventilators, ceiling and wall vents, larger windows, dormer windows and ducting. Achieving an ideal or even adequate level of natural light in classrooms, without glare, was of critical importance to educators. The school building at Duaringa seems to be a combination of the C/T0 and C/T1 types with the verandah hat enclosures of the C/T0 and the highset 14-light end windows of the C/T1. The timber-framed school building at Duaringa was lowset on stumps, and had a hipped roof with a central ventilation fleche, with the roof extending over the front and rear verandahs - both 9 feet (2.7 m) wide with a balustrade of timber rails. The rear verandah also had 4 feet (1.2 m) long semi-enclosed hat rooms, with hand basins, at each end. The single classroom's interior measurements were 31 by 18 feet (9.4 by 5.5 m); it had a coved ceiling; central double doors and two sets of three tall windows in each of the single-skin verandah walls; plus high banks of 14 windows to each end wall. The building was originally orientated so that the front verandah faced north.

A school residence was built at the same time, and appears to be an early version of the DPW's large timber residence of type C/R3. Unlike later examples of the C/R3, the Duaringa residence has a ventilation fleche, and a narrower dining verandah - 7 ft 7inch (2.3m), instead of the 9 ft 6 inch (2.9m) dining verandah of the C/R3. Most Queensland state schools incorporated a teacher's residence on the site, particularly in rural areas. This was partial recompense for a low wage, an incentive for teacher recruitment in rural areas, and provided onsite caretakers. The detached teacher's residence was located within the school grounds at a distance from the teaching buildings, usually with a separate, fenced yard with gardens and trees. The designs ranged from one to four bedrooms and evolved simultaneously with the teaching buildings to adapt to modern needs and styles. Residences designed by DPW architects from 1893 were typically of a higher-quality in design, materials and construction than most similarly scaled private residences.

Like the school building, the residence at Duaringa had a hipped roof with a matching central ventilation fleche, and was timber-framed and lowset on stumps. It consisted of a four-room core (two bedrooms on one side, sitting and dining rooms on the other), with an 8 ft (2.4m) wide front (north) verandah, while a 7 ft 7 inch (2.3m) wide dining verandah separated the core from a kitchen wing with a gabled-roof, which contained the kitchen (with stove recess), a store, bathroom and a bedroom. There was a separate outdoor earth closet (EC). The interiors were lined with wide tongue-and-groove (T&G) beaded boards, and the windows protected by timber, skillion-roofed hoods. The Duaringa residence is closest in form to a standard type that was built by the DPW from 1903 to 1914, but the fleche and the narrower width of the dining verandah are characteristic of its earlier date of construction.

The school soon became the focus of community events. By April 1900, when the average school attendance was 73, a "Christmas-tree show and competition" was held in the school building, on Easter Monday night, to raise funds for wounded soldiers in South Africa (the Boer War).

Additions were made to the school grounds during the early 20th century, including a playshed, for which a tender was accepted in July 1901; and fencing of the school grounds occurred in 1904. In 1911 a lawn tennis match was played between a visiting family and a local team "on the school court", and by 1933 the tennis court site (extant in 2019) had been completed, with the school committee holding euchre parties and dances to raise funds for the court and tennis equipment.

Changes to Block A to improve light and ventilation occurred in 1934, when average attendance was 43. Annotations on 1934 plans indicate that the school building was rotated on the spot so that its front verandah faced east. Other alterations included removing the windows from the verandah walls; enlarging the area of windows in the end walls by lowering the sills and inserting new fanlights; and providing new window shades. This alteration to the end wall windows only occurred at the (now) northern end. A future extension of the southern end of the building, shown on the 1934 plan, did not proceed. The seating in the classroom was rearranged to face in two separate directions, so that the north and south windows were to the left of the students. These changes accorded with the philosophy of the time. From around 1909 windows were rearranged and enlarged to provide a greater amount of gentle, southern light into the room and desks were rearranged so that the light would fall onto students' left hand sides to avoid throwing shadows onto the pages; this presupposed that all students were right-handed.

The residence was also upgraded in 1934, with the addition of a verandah on the east side, with new stairs at its south end replacing the eastern steps of the dining verandah. The windows between the dining and sitting rooms and the new verandah were replaced with French doors. The latter plan includes a bath sketched in the northeast corner of the kitchen wing's bedroom, but it is unknown when this occurred. A 1958 plan shows the bath moved to the southeast corner of the former bedroom, to accommodate a "proposed new bathroom" with a water closet.

In 1934 the school building and residence are both shown on a plan with small fenced gardens to their north. The school grounds at this time also included: a driveway towards the residence from Edward Street; a washhouse near the southeast corner of the residence; three earth closets south of the school buildings; a playshed west of the school building; a horse paddock in the northwest corner of the grounds; and a tennis court, 118 by 50 feet (36 by 15 m) in size was located in the southwest corner of the grounds, about 100 feet (30 m) from George Street.

School grounds were an important component of Queensland state schools. The early and continuing commitment to play-based education, particularly in primary school, resulted in the provision of outdoor play space and sporting facilities, such as ovals and tennis courts. Trees and gardens were planted to shade and beautify schools. In the 1870s, schools inspector William Boyd was critical of tropical schools and amongst his recommendations stressed the importance of adding shade trees to playgrounds. Subsequently, Arbor Day celebrations began in Queensland in 1890. Educators believed gardening and Arbor Days instilled in young minds the value of hard work and activity, improved classroom discipline, developed aesthetic tastes, and inspired people to stay on the land.

Arbor days at Duaringa State School were celebrated with picnics, sporting activities, games, and by planting trees in the school grounds. During the very first Arbor Day in the year after the school opened, a bottle tree was planted, and was still extant in 1951. A photograph of the school building taken prior to it being rotated in 1934 shows open grassed areas with eucalypt trees scattered across the site, and ornamental trees with dense foliage planted around the east and north sides of the school building. Trees were sometimes sourced from far afield, for example, two trees planted at the 1938 Arbor Day celebrations were obtained from the Brisbane Botanic Gardens. While bottle trees are still planted along the Charlotte Street boundary of the school, none appears to be of a sufficient size to be the old bottle tree mentioned in the 1951 newspaper article.

Very little change to the buildings occurred at Duaringa State School between 1934 and the late 1950s, although the eastern verandah of the residence was enclosed c. 1937. Although the school didn't change in this period, Duaringa experienced excitement during World War II, as it was located on the Inland Defence Road between Ipswich and Charters Towers. This all-weather road was first proposed by the Queensland Premier, William Forgan Smith, in October 1938. Work on the road was underway in 1939, and the road was finished during 1942–1943. The Queensland Main Roads Commission was responsible for construction (or upgrades) between Ipswich and Duaringa via Esk, Blackbutt, Nanango, Goomeri, Gayndah, Eidsvold, Camboon, Banana and Wowan, while the New South Wales Department of Main Roads was responsible for the Duaringa to Charters Towers section, via Emerald and Clermont.

Lights and electricity were installed at the school in 1956, and in 1958 a "new bathroom" was added to the residence's kitchen wing, in the former bedroom. The first additional teaching building (called Block B in 2019) was erected in 1959, when the school's average attendance was 57. Block B was erected northwest of Block A, which by this time had a small store enclosed at the north end of its east verandah. It had been originally planned to build Block B to the east of Block A. Blocks A and B were connected by a covered walkway. In 1962 Block B was raised and extended to the east (staff room with store under) and west (classroom), with a new covered way to Block A. Block A was also altered in 1962, with louvre windows added to the east and west walls of the classroom.

More buildings were added to the school from the mid-1960s. A toilet block was installed in 1966, west of Block B, along with a septic system. A water closet was added to the bathroom of the residence at this time. A new highset teaching block (Block C in 2019) was built southwest of Block A in 1971, when the school's average attendance was 101, although it had originally been planned to build Block C to the east of Block B). The west end of the residence's dining verandah was enclosed by 1966. The school oval, south of the school buildings, was formed by 1971.

The school's grounds were also augmented, being extended to the west in 1963, increasing the total size of the school to 7 acres (2.8 ha). The ground's extension absorbed George Street and two residential blocks. There was a cricket field on the additional land by 1966, and a bitumened parade area existed north of Block B (no longer extant).

A variety of trees were planted in the school grounds over the decades, particularly along the front boundary and around the school buildings. A 1962 site plan plots the location and species of a number of trees, most of which no longer survive. However, one survivor is a mature Schotia brachypetala (also known as a parrot tree or kaffir bean) near the northeast corner of Block A. Schools in the Rockhampton region are reported as planting Schotia trees for Arbor Day in the 1930s to the 1950s. Schotia trees, which are good for shade and produce abundant red flowers, were popular in the region from at least the 1930s, with newspapers describing many fine specimens in Rockhampton, where they were planted in parks, gardens and as street trees. It is likely that this tree at Duaringa State School is a surviving Arbor Day tree from around this time.

More additions and changes to the school's buildings occurred from the 1970s. A pre-school was built east of the residence in 1975; and Block C was extended to the west c. 1976, at which time Block A was converted into a library. A new garage was added northeast of the residence by 1981, and in 1983 the wall to the eastern verandah of Block A, south of the store room, was removed, along with the louvre windows and double doors, while the verandah was enclosed with louvres and timber. A swimming pool was added to the southeast corner of the grounds in 1989, and a pottery shed was built between the residence and Block A by 1998. Since 2003, two permanent shade structures, and another school building (south of Block A), have been added to the grounds.

In the first weekend in June 1979 the school celebrated its centenary since opening as a provisional school. Past pupils and staff attended, and buses were provided from Rockhampton. On the Saturday there was a procession from MacKenzie Park to the school, where the Premier, Joh Bjelke-Petersen, opened the celebration after lunch. This was followed by displays, performances, an afternoon BBQ and a Centenary Ball at the school. A gymkhana (horse events) was held at Duaringa on the Sunday.

The school grounds were extended west to Albert Street in 1981, absorbing seven more allotments of Section II, and a final allotment in Section II was added in 1986, forming the current 4.45 hectares (11.0 acres).

In 2017 the school had an enrolment of 22 students.

In 2019, the school continues to operate from its 1899 site. It retains its original 1899 paired school building and residence, a tennis court in its pre-1933 location, and a mature schotia tree. Duaringa State School is important to Duaringa and district as a key social focus for the community, as generations of students have been taught there and many social events held in the school's grounds and buildings since its establishment.

In 2021, the school's student population had grown to 37 students.

== Description ==
Duaringa State School occupies a 4.45-hectare (11.0-acre) block in the small rural town of Duaringa, located approximately 90 kilometres (56 mi) southwest of Rockhampton, on the Capricorn Highway. The school buildings are grouped together at the eastern end of the long, rectangular block, which slopes gently downward in a north-westerly direction. A variety of trees are scattered across the site, with denser clusters of trees and plantings along the front boundary and around the school buildings. A tennis court (pre-1933 site) and two playing fields (formed 1963–1971) occupy the centre of the school grounds. Between the two playing fields, a line of trees demarcates the original western boundary of the school site. The main entrance is via Charlotte Street to the north, with a secondary entrance from Elizabeth Street to the south. Fenced off areas, containing a preschool centre and a swimming pool, occupy the eastern end of the grounds, along Edward Street.

The features of state-level cultural heritage significance within the school complex include:

- Block A, built in 1899
- the teacher's residence built in 1899 and extended in 1934
- the grounds and views of the site

The two buildings stand in alignment with each other, set back an equal distance from Charlotte Street. Both are visible from Charlotte Street, however a later, non-significant classroom wing (Block B) to the northwest of Block A partly blocks views of it. The residence stands to the east of Block A within a fenced yard, and a visual connection between the two buildings is retained.

=== Block A (1899) ===
Block A is a single classroom building with an open west verandah and an enclosed east verandah.

=== Teacher's residence (1899, with 1934 verandah addition) ===
The residence faces north and is accessed by the front verandah and a rear entrance at the southeast corner. It comprises a four-room core of three bedrooms (one originally a sitting room) and a living room (former dining room); a rear wing containing a kitchen, pantry, store room (original bathroom) and bathroom (former servant's room); an enclosed dining verandah between the core and rear wing; and an enclosed verandah along the eastern side (added 1934, enclosed 1937).

=== Grounds and views ===
In 2019, Block A and the teacher's residence remain in their original locations.

== Heritage listing ==
Duaringa State School was listed on the Queensland Heritage Register on 31 May 2019 having satisfied the following criteria.

The place is important in demonstrating the evolution or pattern of Queensland's history.

Duaringa State School (established in 1899) is important in demonstrating the evolution of state education and its associated architecture in Queensland. The place retains representative examples of standard government designs that were architectural responses to prevailing government educational philosophies, set in large grounds with mature trees, play areas and sporting facilities.

These standard designs include an early Department of Public Works (DPW) timber school building (1899), which demonstrates the evolution of timber school buildings to provide adequate lighting and ventilation.

The contemporary large DPW timber teacher's residence (1899), an early version of a standard design, provides evidence of the Queensland Government's policy of providing accommodation for married male head teachers as an inducement to teach in rural areas and to provide a resident caretaker on the site.

The place is important in demonstrating the principal characteristics of a particular class of cultural places.

Duaringa State School is important in demonstrating the principal characteristics of an early Queensland state school complex, comprising a pair of buildings designed by the DPW, located on a large site with mature trees, play areas and sporting facilities.

The teaching building (Block A, 1899) is a standard early DPW timber school building which, through its form and surviving features, has a high level of integrity. It demonstrates the principal characteristics of its type, which include: its lowset hipped-roof form with front and rear verandahs; ventilation fleche; timber-framed and -clad construction; original bank of high windows; single classroom; coved ceiling; and alterations to improve natural lighting and ventilation.

The teacher's residence (1899) is a good, intact example of a Large DPW Timber teacher's residence with a later verandah extension (1934). It retains the principal characteristics of its type, including: its lowset, hipped-roof form; rear kitchen wing with gabled roof; ventilation fleche; front verandah; original joinery and internal linings; and its layout of rooms, including a four-room core and a dining verandah. The 1934 verandah addition (enclosed c. 1937) is a characteristic example of an alteration that was commonly made to teachers' residences to meet changing spatial and functional requirements.

The place has a strong or special association with a particular community or cultural group for social, cultural or spiritual reasons.

Duaringa State School has a strong and ongoing association with past and present pupils, parents, staff members, and the surrounding community through sustained use since its establishment in 1899. The place is important for its contribution to the educational development of Duaringa, with generations of children taught at the school, and has served as a prominent venue for social interaction and community focus.
