= Patterson & Sullivan =

- Industry: Art Services
- Founded: 1921; 104 years ago
- Founder: J.E. Patterson; Ray Sullivan
- Successor: P&H Creative Group; Patterson & Hall
- Headquarters: San Francisco, California, United States
- Website: phcreative.com

Patterson & Sullivan (P&S) was an art service based in San Francisco in the 1920s and 1930s. In addition to their illustration services, P&S employed a staff of graphic and packaging designers as well as typographers, calligraphic artists and photographers.

== History ==
J.E. Patterson and Ray Sullivan founded the San Francisco based art service Patterson & Sullivan in 1921. They provided illustration services for the local advertising agencies such as Lord & Thomas, McCann Erickson, BBD&O, Young & Rubicam and J. Walter Thompson. By the mid-1920s, P&S was attracting many of the country's leading illustrators including John Atherton, Stan Galli, Paul Carey, Jack Painter, Haines Hall, Gib Darling and Amado Gonzalez. These artists were able to supply a wide range of illustration styles evidenced in their campaigns for clients such as Southern Pacific Railroad, Dole Food Company, Del Monte Corporation, Levi Strauss & Co., Stanford University, Standard Oil, Matson Lines and Dollar Steamship Lines.

=== Patterson & Sullivan becomes Patterson & Hall ===
The studio's key artist in 1939 was William Haines Hall, who had joined the firm in 1925. Alton Painter and Haines Hall were members of the Thirteen Watercolorists (founded by Maynard Dixon and Maurice Logan). Hall was also a member of the Bohemian Club, producing posters and portraits for various events. When fellow Patterson & Sullivan employee John Atherton won a $500 first place in the 1929 Bohemian Club art show, Atherton moved to New York and invited Hall to visit. While in New York, Hall met many of the illustrators of the day, including Norman Rockwell and Robert Fawcett, whose sister he would later marry. When Sullivan left P&S in 1939, Haines Hall replaced him as partner in the firm. This led to a change in the art agency's name from Patterson & Sullivan to Patterson & Hall in 1939. It was subsequently changed once more in 1999 from Patterson & Hall to P&H Creative Group which is still in business.
