= William Pattison Telford =

William Pattison Telford may refer to:

- William Pattison Telford Sr. (1836–1922), Canadian Member of Parliament, 1904–1908
- William Pattison Telford Jr. (1867–1955), Canadian Member of Parliament, 1926–1930 and 1935–1944

== See also ==
- William Telford (1912–2003), American politician and former mayor of Springfield, Illinois
