= Pattersonville =

Pattersonville may refer to:

- Pattersonville, Iowa, a former name for Hull, Iowa
- Pattersonville, Louisiana, which was incorporated in 1907 as the Town of Patterson, Louisiana
- Pattersonville, New York
- Pattersonville, Ohio
- Pattersonville, Pennsylvania, see List of places in Pennsylvania: Pa–Pi
