= Mount Paterson (Antarctica) =

Mountain of Antarctica

Coordinates: 78°02′22″S 155°00′18″W

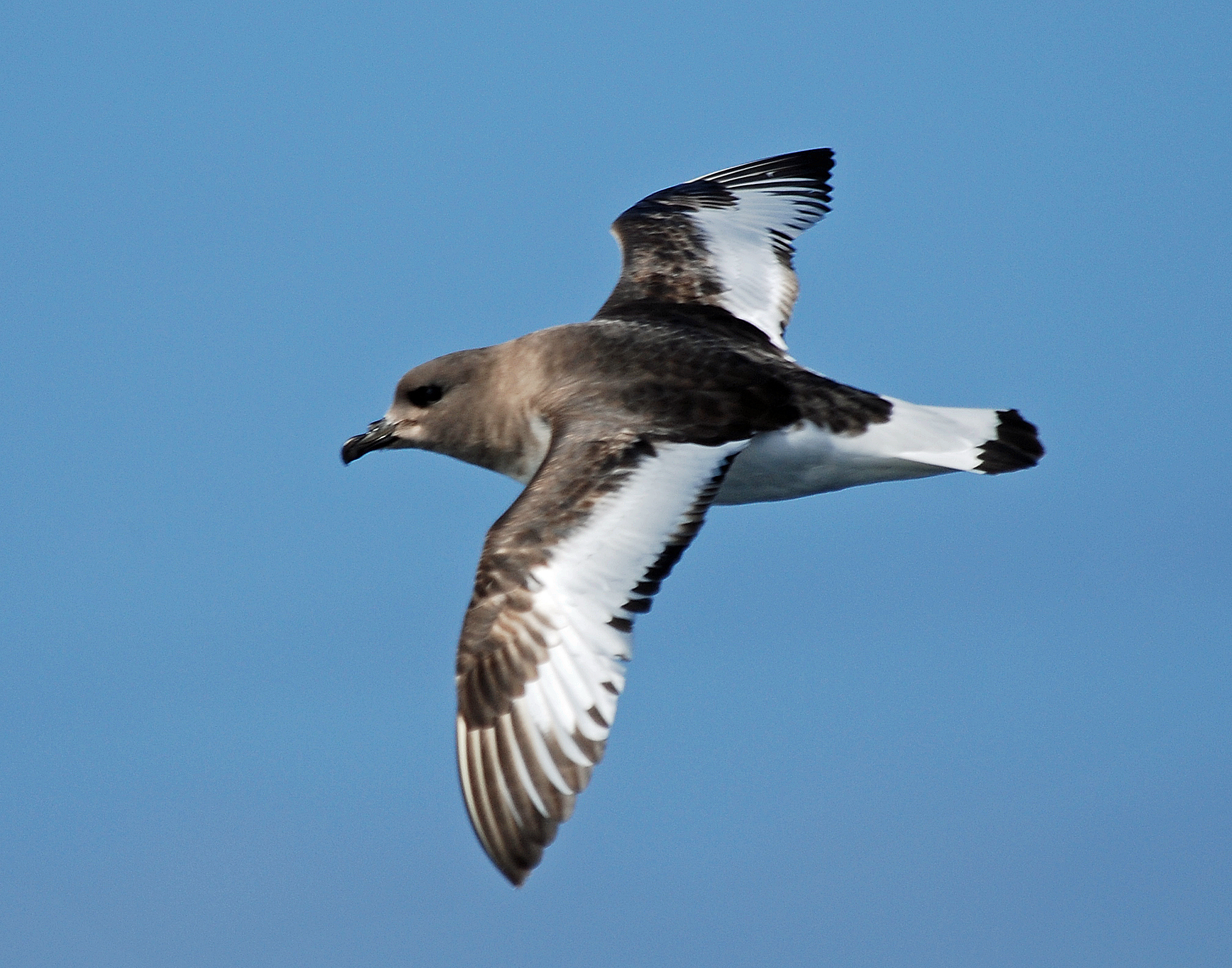
Antarctic petrels breed in the IBA

Mount Paterson is a pyramidal nunatak, 690 m in height, standing on the eastern side of the Rockefeller Mountains in Marie Byrd Land, Antarctica.

== Important Bird Area ==
A 172 ha site comprising the ice-free parts of the mountain has been designated an Important Bird Area (IBA) by BirdLife International because it supports an estimated 10,000 breeding pairs of Antarctic petrels, based on a visit made in 1987–88. A small colony of several hundred snow petrels was seen on the steep upper crags of the southernmost peak.
