= John Pattison =

John Pattison may refer to:

- J.N. Pattison (1839-1903), American pianist and music composer
- John M. Pattison (1847-1906), American politician
- John Pattison (priest) (1851-1918), Dean of Ardfert 1916-1918
- John George Pattison (1875–1917), Canadian Victoria Cross recipient
- Jack Pattison (1887-1970), English footballer
- John Pattison (RNZAF officer) (1917-2009), New Zealand World War II pilot

== See also ==
- John Patteson (disambiguation)
