= Paterson =

Paterson may refer to:

== People ==
- Paterson (surname)
- Paterson (given name)

== Places ==
=== Australia ===
- Paterson, New South Wales
- Paterson River, New South Wales
- Division of Paterson, an electoral district in New South Wales
- Paterson, Queensland, a locality in the Fraser Coast Region, Queensland
- Electoral division of Paterson, an electoral district in Tasmania

=== United States ===
- Paterson, New Jersey
- Paterson, Washington

=== Elsewhere ===
- Mount Paterson (Antarctica)
- Mount Paterson, South Georgia
- Paterson, Eastern Cape, South Africa
- Paterson Inlet, New Zealand
- Paterson Island, a sandspit off of Morrich More, Scotland
- Paterson Street, Hong Kong

== Other uses ==
- Paterson (automobile), a car built by the W. A. Paterson Company from 1909-23
- Paterson (film), a 2016 drama starring Adam Driver
- Paterson (poem), by American poet William Carlos Williams
- Colt Paterson, the first revolver

== See also ==
- Patterson (disambiguation)
- Pattison (disambiguation)
- Petterson
