= Bill Pattinson =

Bill or William Pattinson may refer to:

- Bill Pattinson (rugby league, born 1945) (1945–2026), English rugby league player
- Bill Pattinson (rugby league, born 1954), English rugby league player
