= Boolburra =

- Town
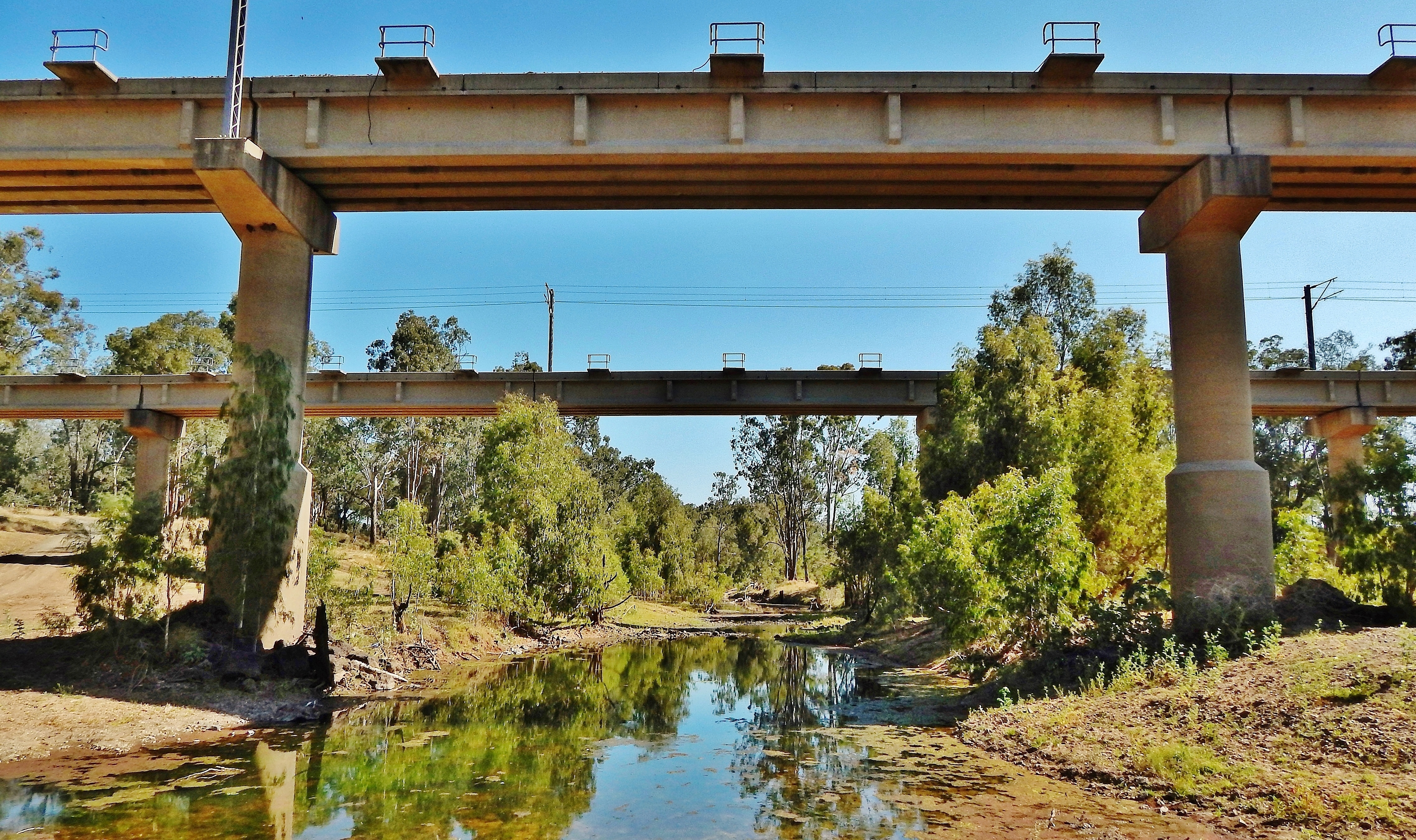
- Central Western railway line crossing the Dawson River between Boolburra and Duaringa, 2017

- Interactive map of Boolburra
- Coordinates: 23.7352°S 149.7827°E
- Country: Australia
- State: Queensland
- LGA: Central Highlands Region
- Location: 90.9 km (56.5 mi) SW of Rockhampton; 190 km (120 mi) E of Emerald; 702 km (436 mi) NNW of Brisbane

Government
  - State electorate: Gregory
  - Federal division: Flynn

Area
  - Total: 320.1 km^{2} (123.6 sq mi)

Population
  - Total: 34 (2021 census)
  - Density: 0.1062/km^{2} (0.275/sq mi)
- Time zone: UTC+10:00 (AEST)
- Postcode: 4702
Localities around Boolburra
Gogango	Gogango	Gogango
Duaringa	Boolburra	Gogango
Duaringa	Gainsford	Gainsford

Boolburra is a rural town and locality in the Central Highlands Region, Queensland, Australia. In the 2021 census, the locality of Boolburra had a population of 34 people.

== Geography ==
The locality is bounded to the north by the Fitzroy River, to the east by the Gogango Range, to the south by the Capricorn Highway and to the west by the Dawson River.

Boolburra has one named peak, Round Hill in the east of the locality (23.7090°S 149.8947°E) at 230 metres (750 ft) above sea level.

The Capricorn Highway enters the locality from the east (Gogango) and exits to the south-west (Duaringa).

The Central Western railway line enters the locality from the east (Gogango) and exits to the west (Duaringa), with the locality being served by three railway stations (from west to east):

- Boolburra railway station (23.7363°S 149.7827°E)
- Edungalba railway station (23.7162°S 149.8507°E)
- Tunnel railway station (23.7009°S 149.9224°E)

The town of Boolburra was laid out immediately north of the Boolburra railway station, but there are no buildings today.

The town of Edungalba was laid out immediately south of the Edungalba railway station, but there are only a few buildings today.

There is some crop growing in the west of the locality along the Dawson River, but the land use is predominantly grazing on native vegetation.

== History ==
Boolburra Provisional School opened on 31 August 1874. In 1883, a school reserve of 6 acres 1 rood 10 perches (2.55 ha) was proclaimed, just north of the Boolburra railway station bounded by Station Road, Dawson Road, and Thomas Street (23.73487°S 149.78337°E). Patrick Aloysius Murtagh was school master at the school for 30 years from circa 1883 to circa 1913. He also conducted a 160-acre (65 ha) agricultural farm named Gainsford at the same time. On 1 January 1909, the school became Boolburra State School. It closed on 22 April 1926.

Herbert's Creek State School opened on 26 April 1915, but was renamed Edungalba State School in 1918. It closed on 4 February 1974. It was not in the town of Edungalba, but slightly north-west of the town between Herbert Creek and the railway line (approx 23.71491°S 149.85919°E).

== Demographics ==
In the 2016 census, the locality of Boolburra had a population of 24 people.

In the 2021 census, the locality of Boolburra had a population of 34 people.

== Education ==
There are no schools in Boolburra. The nearest government primary schools are Gogango State School in neighbouring Gogango to the east and Duaringa State School in neighbouring Duaringa to the west. There are no nearby secondary schools; the alternatives are distance education and boarding school.
