= Ron Pattinson =

English historian

Ronald "Ron" Pattinson (born 1956) is an English historian who specialises in the history of beer and brewing. He is best known as the author of The Home Brewer's Guide to Vintage Beer. He has collaborated with breweries such as Goose Island, Fuller's and Harvey's to produce recreations of historical beer recipes.

== Biography ==
Pattinson was born in Newcastle upon Tyne, and relocated with his family to Newark upon Trent in the early 1960s. He attended the University of Leeds and became a computer programmer. He lives in Amsterdam.
