= William R. Patterson =

- Born: 1975-12-12; Chicago, Illinois, United States
- Occupation(s): Author, Professional speaker

William R. Patterson is chairman and CEO of The Warcoffer Capital Group, LLC. He leads the firm's corporate strategy and development consulting efforts.

Patterson is the business and financial expert on XM Satellite Radio – The Power (XM). He is also co-author of the business and personal finance book, The Baron Son, which was featured in the Forbes Book Club and Black Enterprise magazine.

In 2004, Patterson co-founded The Baron Solution Group, a coaching and consulting firm for executive leaders, entrepreneurs and investors. His website, The Baron Series, is ranked as the number one business motivational speaker website by Ranking.com and is winner of three 2008 Black Web Awards: Best Wealth-Building Site; Best Male Author Site; and Best Lecturer, Speaker and Workshop Site.

Prior to winning three 2008 Black Web Awards, BaronSeries.com won the 2007 Black Web Award for Best Lecturer, Speaker and Workshop Site.

== Books ==
- The Baron Son: Vade Mecum 7 (2005) Long & Silverman Publishing, Inc. ISBN 1-59575-357-5
- The Baron Son: Vade Mecum 7 Audio Book (2006) Gildan Media ISBN 1-59659-073-4
- Nauki Barona (2006) One Press ISBN 83-246-0340-9
