= Patterson Township =

Patterson Township may refer to:

== Canada ==
- Patterson Township, Ontario

== United States ==
- Patterson Township, Greene County, Illinois
- Patterson Township, Caldwell County, North Carolina, in Caldwell County, North Carolina
- Patterson Township, Darke County, Ohio
- Patterson Township, Beaver County, Pennsylvania
