= Winifred Dakyns =

British naval officer (1875–1960)

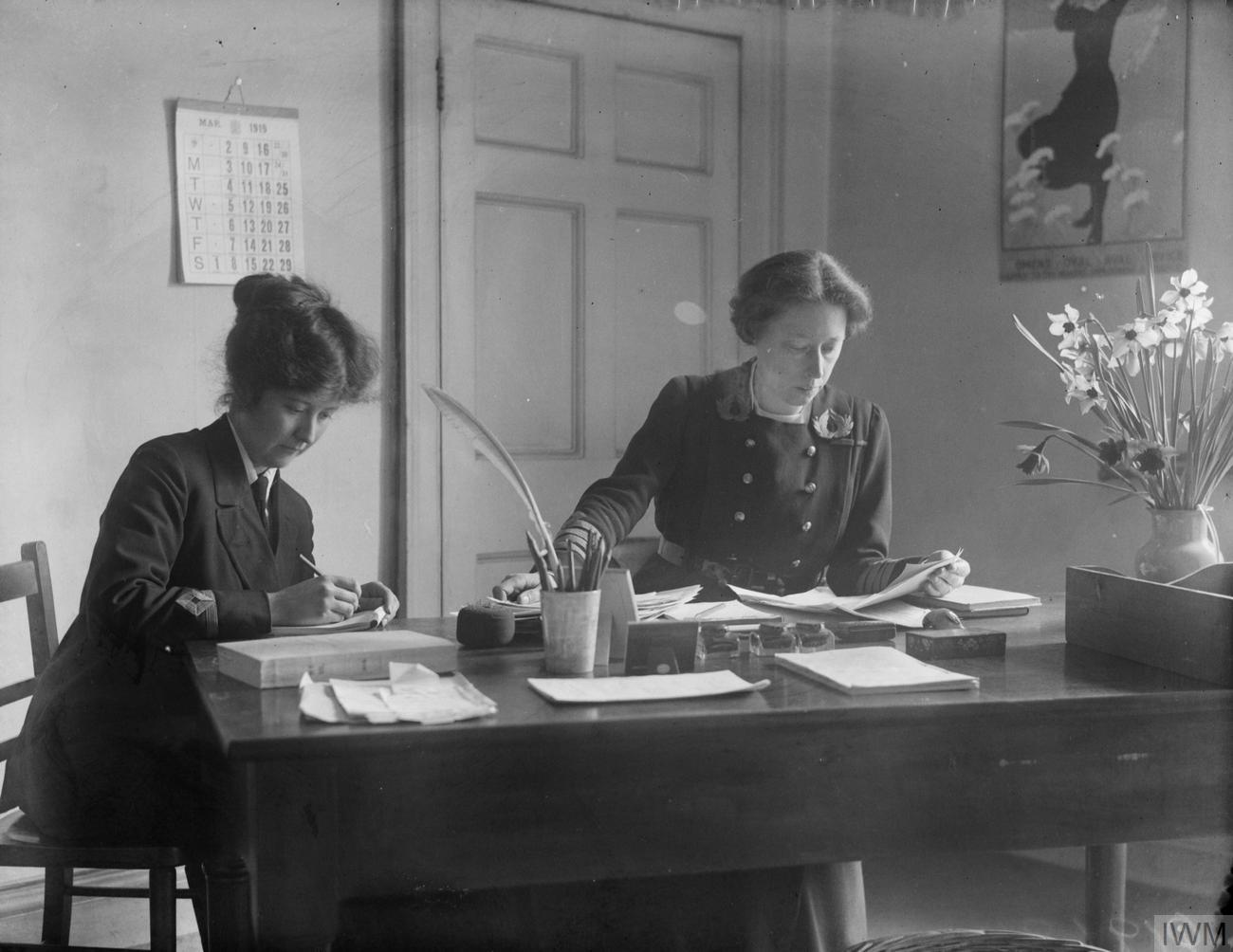
Dakyns and her secretary, 1917.

Winifred Dakyns CBE (née Pattinson, 1875-1960) was a British naval officer during World War I and assistant director of the Women's Royal Naval Service (WRNS) from December 1917 until the WRNS was disbanded in 1919 (to be revived in 1939).

She was born on 16 September 1875 in Gateshead and educated at Gateshead High School and Newnham College, Cambridge. She married Henry Graham Dakyns in 1902; he died in 1937.

She worked with Katharine Furse in the Voluntary Aid Detachment (VAD) and then in the earliest days of the WRNS. At the time of her death in 1960 one of her uniforms was shown in the Imperial War Museum as a representative WRNS officer's uniform.

She was appointed CBE (military) "for valuable services in connection with the war" in 1919, and was also an honorary serving sister of the order of St John of Jerusalem.

She died on 22 January 1960. Her home, Wickham Farmhouse in Hurstpierpoint, was designated a grade II listed building on 11 May 1983.
