= Jimmy Pattison (baseball) =

American baseball player (1908-1991)

- Pitcher
- Born: December 18, 1908; The Bronx, New York, U.S.
- Died: February 22, 1991 (aged 82); Melbourne, Florida, U.S.
- Batted: Left Threw: Left

MLB debut
- April 18, 1929, for the Brooklyn Robins

Last MLB appearance
- May 13, 1929, for the Brooklyn Robins

MLB statistics
- Win–loss record: 0–1
- Earned run average: 4.63
- Strikeouts: 5
- Stats at Baseball Reference

Teams
- Brooklyn Robins (1929)

James Wells Pattison (December 18, 1908 – February 22, 1991) was an American pitcher in Major League Baseball. He pitched in six games for the 1929 Brooklyn Robins.

Pattison attended James Madison High School in Brooklyn where, in 1927, he won a Public Schools Athletic League baseball championship in a pitching duel against Izzy Goldstein of James Monroe High School.
