= The Capricornian =

Former newspaper in Queensland, Australia

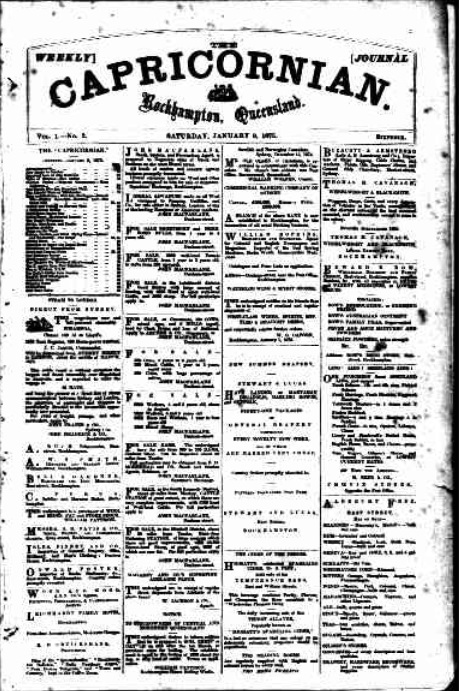
Front page of The Capricornian, 9 January 1875

The Capricornian was a newspaper published in Rockhampton, Queensland from 1875 to 1929.

== History ==
The Capricornian was published from 2 January 1875 to 26 December 1929 in Rockhampton, Queensland. It merged with the Artesian to form the Central Queensland Herald. It was published by Charles Hardie Buzacott.

== Digitisation ==
The paper has been digitised as part of the Australian Newspapers Digitisation Program of the National Library of Australia.

== See also ==
- List of newspapers in Australia
