= USS William J. Pattison =

1944 Crosley-class high speed transport

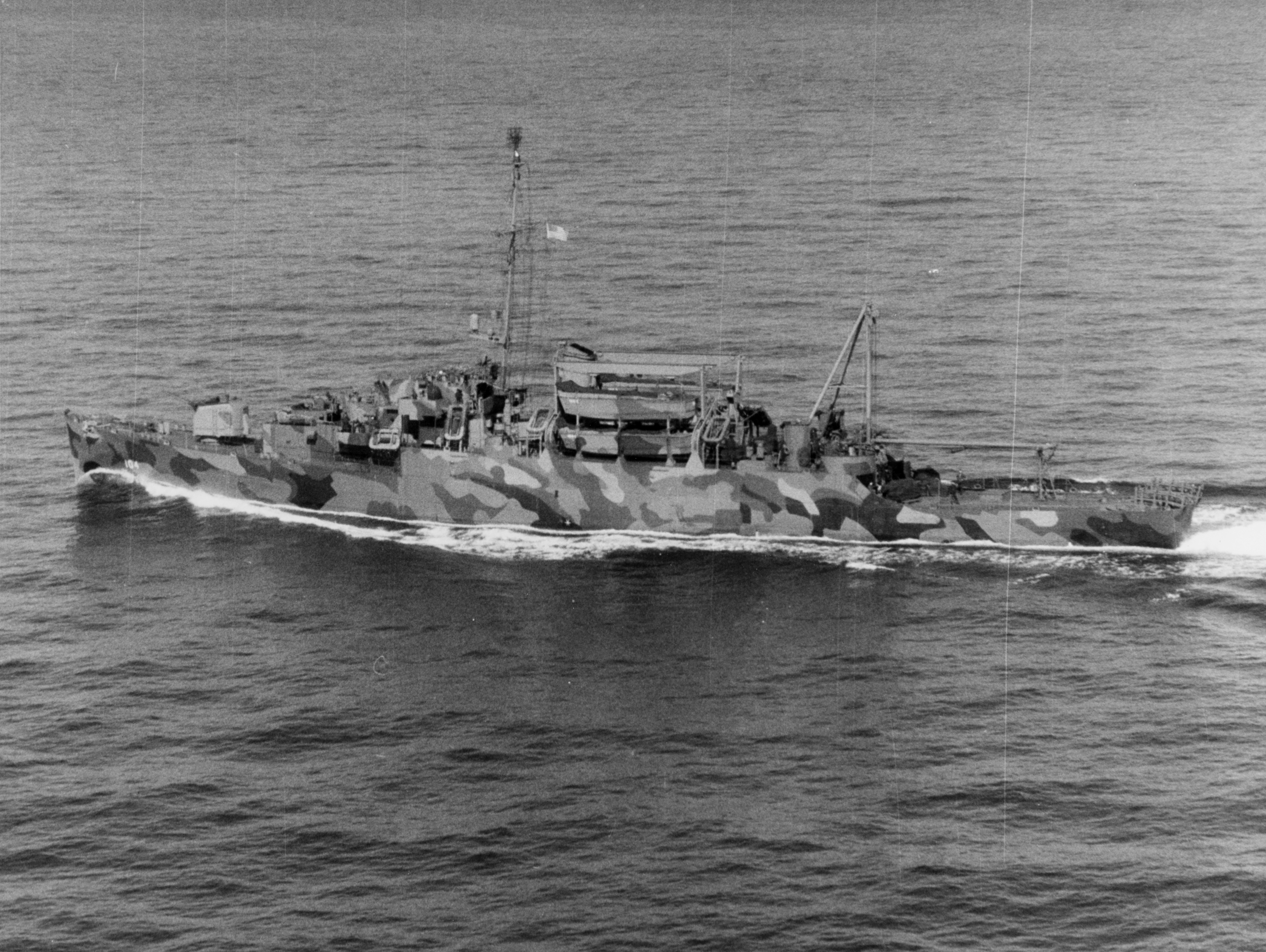
- USS William J. Pattison on 9 March 1945

History

United States
- Name: USS William J. Pattison
- Namesake: Signalman Third Class William J. Pattison (1921-1943), a U.S. Navy sailor and Navy Cross recipient
- Builder: Bethlehem-Hingham Shipyard, Inc., Hingham, Massachusetts
- Laid down: 4 January 1944
- Launched: 15 February 1944
- Sponsored by: Miss Sally McKillop
- Commissioned: 27 February 1945
- Decommissioned: March 1946
- Reclassified: From destroyer escort (DE-594) to high-speed transport (APD-104) 17 July 1944
- Stricken: 1 June 1960
- Fate: Sold for scrapping 18 January 1962
- Notes: Laid down as Rudderow-class destroyer escort USS William J. Pattison (DE-594)

General characteristics
- Class & type: Crosley-class high speed transport
- Displacement: 2,130 long tons (2,164 t) full
- Length: 306 ft (93 m)
- Beam: 37 ft (11 m)
- Draft: 12 ft 7 in (3.84 m)
- Speed: 23 knots (43 km/h; 26 mph)
- Troops: 162
- Complement: 204
- Armament: 1 × 5 in (130 mm) gun; 6 × 40 mm guns; 6 × 20 mm guns; 2 × depth charge tracks

USS William J. Pattison (APD-104), ex-DE-594, was a United States Navy high-speed transport in commission from 1945 to 1946.

== Namesake ==
William Joseph Pattison was born on 15 January 1921 at Long Island City, New York . He enlisted in the U.S. Navy on 23 August 1939 at Indianapolis, Indiana. Pattison advanced steadily in rating and, at least once, was meritoriously promoted. By the beginning of 1943, he had reached the rank of signalman third class and was serving in the destroyer USS Eberle in the South Atlantic Ocean.

On 10 March 1943, Eberle encountered the German blockade runner Karin, which was flying the Dutch flag. The task group commander, Rear Admiral O. M. Read, ordered Eberle to ignore Karin's Allied flag and board her. Pattison was one of the 14 men chosen from Eberle's complement to board Karin before Karin's crew could scuttle her. In spite of rising flames and explosions, Pattison performed his salvage duties, primarily by maintaining contact with Eberle while his colleagues searched for demolition charges. While executing his duty, Pattison was killed by the explosion of one of the German demolition charges. He was posthumously awarded the Navy Cross.

== Construction and commissioning ==
William J. Pattison was laid down as the Rudderow-class destroyer escort USS William J. Pattison (DE-594) on 4 January 1944 by Bethlehem-Hingham Shipyard, Inc., at Hingham, Massachusetts, and was launched on 15 February 1944, sponsored by Miss Sally McKillop. The ship was reclassified as a Crosley-class high-speed transport and redesignated APD-104 on 17 July 1944. After conversion to her new role, she was commissioned on 27 February 1945.

== Service history ==
=== World War II ===
Following shakedown training out of Guantanamo Bay, Cuba, and amphibious training at Hampton Roads, Virginia, William J. Pattison underwent post-shakedown repairs at the Portsmouth Navy Yard in Kittery, Maine, between 20 April 1945 and 27 April 1945.

On 27 April 1945, William J. Pattison departed Portsmouth, New Hampshire, bound for New York City. There she rendezvoused with the transport USS General William Weigel (AP-119), and the two ships got underway on 1 May 1945 and headed for the West Indies. After a stop at San Juan, Puerto Rico, from 4 May 1945 to 8 May 1945, the two ships continued on to the Panama Canal Zone, where they arrived on 10 May 1945. William J. Pattison transited the Panama Canal on 12 May 1945 and set course for San Diego, California. Diverted en route in order to provide emergency medical treatment to an appendicitis victim on board a Liberty ship, she did not reach San Diego until 22 May 1945.

William J. Pattison remained at San Diego only two days before putting to sea on 24 May 1945 in company with high-speed transports USS Begor (APD-127) and USS Cavallaro (APD-128). After a six-day voyage filled with gunnery drills and tactical exercises, the three high-speed transports arrived in Pearl Harbor, Territory of Hawaii, on 30 May 1945. William J, Pattison spent the next two weeks in amphibious and underwater demolition team training in Hawaiian waters, mostly at Maui.

On 13 June 1945, William J. Pattison embarked 10 officers and 50 enlisted men and got underway for the Marshall Islands, in company with Cavallaro and SS Cape Meares. The three ships entered the lagoon at Eniwetok on 21 June 1945, but on 23 June 1945 got underway again with a convoy bound for Ulithi Atoll in the Caroline Islands. William J. Pattison remained at Ulithi from 26 June 1945 to 1 July 1945, when she began the two-day voyage to Leyte in the Philippine Islands. After eight days at Leyte, she headed back to Ulithi Atoll on 12 July 1945.

In late July and early August 1945, William J. Pattison made two voyages from Ulithi Atoll to Okinawa. Though both visits were somewhat enlivened by air raid alerts, she saw no action. The surrender of Japan which ended World War II on 15 August 1945 found the ship on her way from Okinawa to the Mariana Islands.

=== Postwar ===
William J. Pattison arrived at Guam in the Marianas on 17 August 1945 and embarked Underwater Demolition Team 18. On 20 August 1945, she departed Guam in company with Begor and a group of tank landing ships (LSTs) to join the United States Third Fleet off Japan. William J. Pattison and Begor soon parted company with the slower LSTs and made the rendezvous with the Third Fleet on the night of 24–25 August 1945.

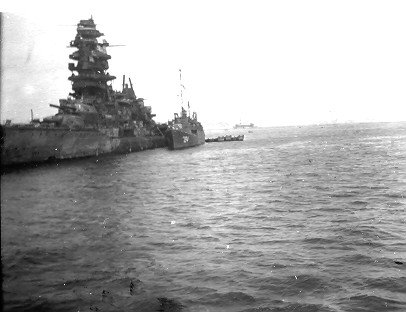
USS William J. Pattison (right) alongside the Japanese battleship Nagato in Tokyo Bay in September 1945.

William J. Pattison arrived in Tokyo Bay late in the afternoon of 27 August 1945 to begin her part in the postwar occupation of Japan. On 30 August 1945, she supported the United States Marines who occupied Yokosuka Naval Base, and her underwater demolition team unit carried out an inspection of the base's harbor facilities. Later, she participated in the demilitarization of captured Japanese warships. For the next month, William J. Pattison steamed among various Japanese bases located throughout the Japanese Home Islands, reconnoitering to prepare for their occupation by United States Marine Corps, United States Army, or U.S. Navy men. She also helped with further demilitarization projects.

On 30 September, the ship got underway on the first leg of her journey back to the United States. After stops at Guam, Eniwetok, and Pearl Harbor, she arrived back in San Diego on 22 October 1945.

William J. Pattison remained active with the Amphibious Forces, United States Pacific Fleet, into early 1946, when she moved to Green Cove Springs, Florida.

== Decommissioning and disposal ==
William J. Pattison was decommissioned at Green Cove Springs sometime in March 1946. She remained in reserve there with the Atlantic Reserve Fleet until 1 June 1960, when her name was stricken from the Navy List.

On 18 January 1962, William J. Pattison was sold to the First Steel and Ship Corporation of New York City for scrapping.
