= Artie Pattinson =

Australian rules footballer

Personal information
- Full name: Arthur Thomas Abraham Pattinson
- Born: 13 May 1880; Concord, New South Wales
- Died: 27 June 1964 (aged 84); Frankston, Victoria
- Height: 189 cm (6 ft 2 in)
- Weight: 92 kg (203 lb)

Playing career^{1}
Years	Club	Games (Goals)
1909	St Kilda	4 (4)
- ^{1} Playing statistics correct to the end of 1909.

Arthur Thomas Abraham Pattinson (13 May 1880 – 27 June 1964) was an Australian rules footballer who played for the St Kilda Football Club in the Victorian Football League (VFL).
