= Willie Paterson =

Scottish footballer

Personal information
- Full name: William Francis Paterson (Note: The name and place of birth combination have been provided in sources, but no corresponding entry was found on ScotlandsPeople.)
- Place of birth: Hamilton, Scotland
- Height: 5 ft 8 in (1.73 m)
- Position: Wing half

Senior career*
Years	Team	Apps	(Gls)
–	Earnock Rovers		
–	Petershill		
1913–1919	Hamilton Academical	132	(3)
1919–1925	Motherwell	126	(1)
1922–1923 (Note: Loan spell recorded under the name Frank Paterson in sources.)	→ Bo'ness (loan)	17	(1)
1923–1924	→ Arbroath (loan)	15	(0)
1925–1928	Charlton Athletic	93	(0)
–	Bostall Heath		
Total		383	(5)
- * Club domestic league appearances and goals

William Francis Paterson was a Scottish footballer who played as a wing half (capable of being deployed in the left or right berth), primarily for Hamilton Academical, Motherwell and Charlton Athletic.
