= Patterson (surname) =

Origin
- Origin: Scottish, English, Irish
- Meaning: Son of Patrick
- Region of origin: Scotland, England, Ireland

Other names
- Variant forms: Paterson, Pattinson, Pattison

Patterson is a surname originating in Scotland, Ireland, and Northern England meaning "son of Patrick". There are other spellings, including Pattison and Pattinson. Notable people with the surname Patterson include:

== A ==
- Ahmet Patterson (fl. 2010s), English boxer of Turkish Cypriot and Jamaican origin
- Alan Patterson (born 1941), New Zealand field hockey player
- Alan Patterson (1886–1916), British athlete
- Albert Patterson (1894–1954), American politician and assassination victim
- Alexander Bell Patterson (1911–1993), Canadian politician
- Alfred Nash Patterson (1914–1979), American choral conductor
- Alvin "Seeco" Patterson (1930–2021), Jamaican percussionist
- Ambrose McCarthy Patterson (1877–1967), Australian artist
- Andre Patterson (basketball) (born 1983), American basketball player
- Andrew Patterson (cricketer) (born 1975), Irish cricketer
- Andrew Patterson (architect) (born 1960) New Zealand architect
- Andrew Patterson (Patterson), fictional academic in the 1981 UK radio series Patterson
- Anne W. Patterson (born 1949), American diplomat
- Arthur Gordon Patterson (1917–1996), British Army general
- Arthur Lindo Patterson (1902–1966), Canadian/American physicist

== B ==
- Benjamin B. Patterson (1910–1986), American businessman and politician
- Beth Patterson (fl. 1990s–2020s), Irish musician
- Bobby Patterson (disambiguation)
- Brian Patterson (born 1965), bicycle motocross (BMX) racer
- L. Brooks Patterson (1939–2019), American politician
- Bruce Patterson (disambiguation)

== C ==
- C. H. Patterson (1912–2006), American psychologist
- Carlile Pollock Patterson (1816–1881), American civil engineer
- Carly Patterson (born 1988), American gymnast
- Cecil Frederick Patterson (1891–1961), Canadian horticulturalist
- Charles E. Patterson (1842–1913), New York politician
- Charles Richard Patterson (1833–1910), African-American carriage manufacturer, entrepreneur and civil rights activist
- Charlotte Patterson (fl. 1970s–2020s), American psychologist
- Christian Patterson (born 1972), American photographer
- Christina Patterson (born 1988), American economist
- Christopher Salmon Patterson (1823–1893), Canadian judge
- Christopher Stuart Patterson (1842–1924), American Dean of the University of Pennsylvania Law School
- Eleanor "Cissy" Patterson (1881–1948), American newspaper editor
- Clair Patterson (1922–1995), American geochemist
- Claude Patterson (born 1941), American wrestler
- Colin Patterson (disambiguation), several people
- Cordarrelle Patterson (born 1991), American football player
- Corey Patterson (born 1979), American baseball player

== D ==
- Daniel Patterson (disambiguation)
- Darren Patterson (born 1969), Northern Ireland footballer
- Daryl Patterson (1943–2025), American baseball player
- David A. Patterson (born 1947), computer science professor at UC Berkeley
- David J. Patterson (fl. 1970s–2000s), Irish scientist at Marine Biological Laboratory; generally known as "Paddy" Patterson
- David T. Patterson (1818–1891), American politician
- Diana Patterson (born c. 1951), Australian Antarctic worker
- Don Patterson (disambiguation)
- Duncan Patterson (born 1975), Liverpool born songwriter

== E ==
- Ed Patterson (born 1972), Canadian hockey player
- Edna Patterson (1914–1998), Soviet spy
- Eddie Patterson (born 1968), Irish football manager
- Edi Patterson, American actress and writer
- Eleanor Patterson (born 1996), Australian high jumper
- Elizabeth Patterson Bonaparte (1785–1879), first wife of Jérôme Bonaparte
- Ellis E. Patterson (1897–1985), American politician
- Emma Patterson (1848–1886), British feminist and union activist
- Eugene Patterson (1923–2013), American journalist and civil rights activist.

== F ==
- Floyd Patterson (1935–2006), world heavyweight champion boxer
- Frances Taylor Patterson (1893–1971), American writer, lecturer on film
- Francine Patterson (born 1947), American gorilla researcher, daughter of C. H. Patterson
- Francis E. Patterson (1821–1862), American military officer
- Frank Patterson (illustrator) (1871–1952), Cycling illustrator
- Frank Patterson (1938–2000), Irish tenor
- Frank Harris Patterson (1890–1976), Canadian lawyer and historian
- Fredrick Patterson (1871–1932), African-American entrepreneur and first car manufacturer of the Greenfield-Patterson automobile of 1915
- Frederick D. Patterson (1901–1988), American veterinarian and college president
- Freeman Patterson (born 1937), Canadian photographer

== G ==
- Garnet Patterson (born 1993), Australian racing driver
- Gary Patterson (born 1960), American football coach
- Gavin Patterson (born 1967), British business executive
- George Patterson (disambiguation), several people
- Gil Patterson (born 1955), American baseball player
- Gilbert B. Patterson (1863–1922), member of U.S. House of Representatives from North Carolina
- Gilbert E. Patterson (1939–2007), American bishop
- Glenn Patterson (1961–), An award-winning writer and novelist from Belfast, Northern Ireland

== H ==
- Hank Patterson (1888–1975), American actor and musician
- Hannah J. Patterson (1879–1937), American suffragist
- Harry Norton Patterson (1853–1919), American printer and botanist
- Harry J. Patterson (1866–1946), American college president
- Harvey Patterson (1924–2014), Canadian politician
- Hayley Patterson, fictional character Hayley Cropper from Coronation Street from 1998 to 2014
- Henry Patterson (1929–2022), British novelist who wrote as Jack Higgins
- A. Holly Patterson (1898–1980), American politician

== I ==
- I. L. Patterson (1859–1929), American politician, Oregon Governor
- Idelle Patterson (1880–1968), American singer
- Imani Patterson (fl. 1990s–2000s), actor from the cast of Sesame Street

== J ==
- Jaan Patterson (fl. 2000s–2010s), founder of Surrism-Phonoethics
- Jacory Patterson (born 2000), American sprinter
- Jake Patterson (fl. 2000s–2020s), American murderer and kidnapper of Jayme Closs
- James Patterson (disambiguation), several people
- Jane Patterson (fl. 1990s), Canadian judoka
- Jane Lippitt Patterson (1829–1919), American writer, editor
- Janet Patterson (1956–2016), Australian costume designer
- Jaret Patterson (born 1999), American football player
- Jarrett Patterson (born 1999), American football player
- Javon Patterson (born 1997), American football player
- Jerry Patterson (disambiguation), several people including:
  - Jerry E. Patterson (born 1946), former Commissioner of the General Land Office of Texas
  - Jerry L. Patterson (fl. 1970s–2000s), American author of five gambling related books
  - Jerry M. Patterson (1934–2024), American politician from California
- John Patterson (disambiguation), several people including:
  - John W. Patterson (1872–1940), nicknamed "Pat", African American baseball player around the turn of the 20th century
  - John Henry Patterson (author) (1867–1947), Anglo-Irish soldier who wrote The Man-Eaters of Tsavo which was made into the film The Ghost and the Darkness in 1996
  - John Henry Patterson (Medal of Honor) (1843–1920), recipient of the Medal of Honor
  - John Henry Patterson (NCR owner) (1844–1922), American businessman who founded the National Cash Register Company
  - John M. Patterson (1921–2021), American politician, son of Albert Patterson
  - John Patterson (director) (1940–2005), American film and television director
  - John Patterson (pitcher) (born 1978), major league pitcher
  - John Patterson (infielder) (born 1967), former major league infielder
- Johnny Patterson (1840–1889) Irish songwriter, musician and circus entertainer
- Johnny Patterson (racing driver) (died 1959), former NASCAR Cup Series driver
- Joseph Medill Patterson (1879–1946), American journalist and publisher, brother of Eleanor Medill Patterson

== K ==
- Kai Patterson (fl. 2020s), filmmaker and creator of Obi-Wan Kenobi: The Patterson Cut
- Kathleen Patterson (born 1948), American politician
- Kay Patterson (Australian politician) (born 1944), Australian politician
- Kay Patterson (South Carolina politician) (1931–2024), American politician
- Kelsey Patterson (1954–2004), American convicted murderer
- Kevin Patterson (writer) (born 1964), Canadian writer
- Kevin Patterson (singer) (fl. 1980s–2010s), Scottish songwriter and singer

== L ==
- LaFayette L. Patterson (1888–1987), American politician
- Leah Patterson, Home and Away character
- Lee Patterson (1929–2007), Canadian actor
- Sir Les Patterson, fictional Australian from the stage show of Barry Humphries
- Liz J. Patterson (1939–2018), American politician
- Lloyd Patterson (born 1957), American player of Canadian football
- Lorna Patterson (born 1956), American actress
- Louise Thompson Patterson (1901–1999), American academic and activist
- MC Ren (born Lorenzo Patterson, 1969), American rapper and member of N.W.A
- Lyndon Pete Patterson (1934–2017), American politician

== M ==
- Malcolm R. Patterson (1861–1935), American politician
- Marckell Patterson (born 1979), American basketball player
- Marnette Patterson (born 1980), American actress
- Marvin Breckinridge Patterson (1905–2002), American photojournalist
- Melody Patterson (1949–2015), American actress
- Michael Patterson (disambiguation)
- Mike Patterson (disambiguation)
- Minnie Ward Patterson (1844–1916), American poet and author
- Monty Patterson (born 1996), New Zealand footballer

== N ==
- Neva Patterson (1920–2010), American actress
- Neville Patterson (1916–1987), chief justice of the Supreme Court of Mississippi
- Nick Patterson (disambiguation)
- Norman Patterson (soccer) (1945–2012)

== O ==
- Orlando Patterson (born 1940), American historical and cultural sociologist
- Ottilie Patterson (1932–2011), Northern Irish blues singer

== P ==
- P. J. Patterson (born 1935), Prime Minister of Jamaica
- Paige Patterson (born 1942), American Baptist theologian
- Pat Patterson (disambiguation), several people
- Patrick Patterson (cricketer) (born 1961), Jamaican cricketer
- Paul Patterson (disambiguation), several people including:
  - Paul Patterson (composer) (born 1947), British composer
  - Paul Patterson (neuroscientist) (1943–2014), an American neuroscientist
  - Paul Patterson (footballer) (born 1965), an Australian rules footballer
  - Paul L. Patterson (1900–1956), Governor of the U.S. state of Oregon
- Peter Patterson (disambiguation), several people

== R ==
- Randall Patterson (born 1977), American adventurer and musician
- Ray Patterson (animator) (1911–2001), American animator
- Ray Patterson (basketball) (1922–2011), American basketball player
- Raymond M. Patterson (1898–1984), British writer and explorer
- Reinaldo Patterson (born 1956), Cuban javelin thrower
- Ricardo Patterson (born 1957), Argentine agricultural engineer and politician
- Richard Patterson (disambiguation), several people
- Richard North Patterson (born 1947), American writer
- Riley Patterson (born 1998), American football player
- Robert Patterson, multiple people
- Rufus Lenoir Patterson (1830–1879), American politician and businessman
- Russell Patterson (1893–1977), cartoonist
- Ruth Patterson (minister) (born 1944), Northern Ireland Presbyterian minister

== S ==
- Samuel James Patterson (born 1948), Northern Irish mathematician
- Sarah Patterson (born 1970), English actress
- Sarah Patterson (coach) (fl. 1970s–2010s), American gymnastics coach
- Scott Patterson (curler) (1969–2004), Canadian curler
- Scott Patterson (born 1958), American actor
- Shea Patterson (born 1997), American football player
- Shirley Patterson (1922–1995), Canadian born actress
- Sid Patterson (1927–1999), Australian cyclist
- Simon Patterson (disambiguation), several people
- Stephen Patterson (born 1971), Australian rules footballer
- Steve Patterson (basketball) (1948–2004), American basketball player and coach

== T ==
- Thomas Patterson (disambiguation), several people
- Tyson Patterson (born 1978), American professional basketball player

== W ==
- Wilfrid Patterson (1893–1954), Royal Navy Admiral
- William Patterson (disambiguation), several people including:
  - William Albert Patterson (1841–1917), Canadian Member of Parliament
  - William John Patterson (1886–1976), Canadian Premier of Saskatchewan
  - William Patterson (engineer) (1795–1869), 19th century engineer and boatbuilder
  - William Patterson, author of subjects and dialogues for the comic strip Jeff Hawke
  - William A. Patterson (1899–1980), United Airlines president
  - William L. Patterson (1891–1980), leader in the Communist Party USA and an African-American civil rights activist
  - R. William Patterson (1908–1994), American politician
  - William Worth Patterson (1849–1921), American businessman, mayor, and post office inspector

== See also ==
- Paterson (disambiguation)
- Patterson family
- Pattinson
- Pattison (disambiguation)
- Petterson
