= A151 road =

Road in Lincolnshire, England

A151

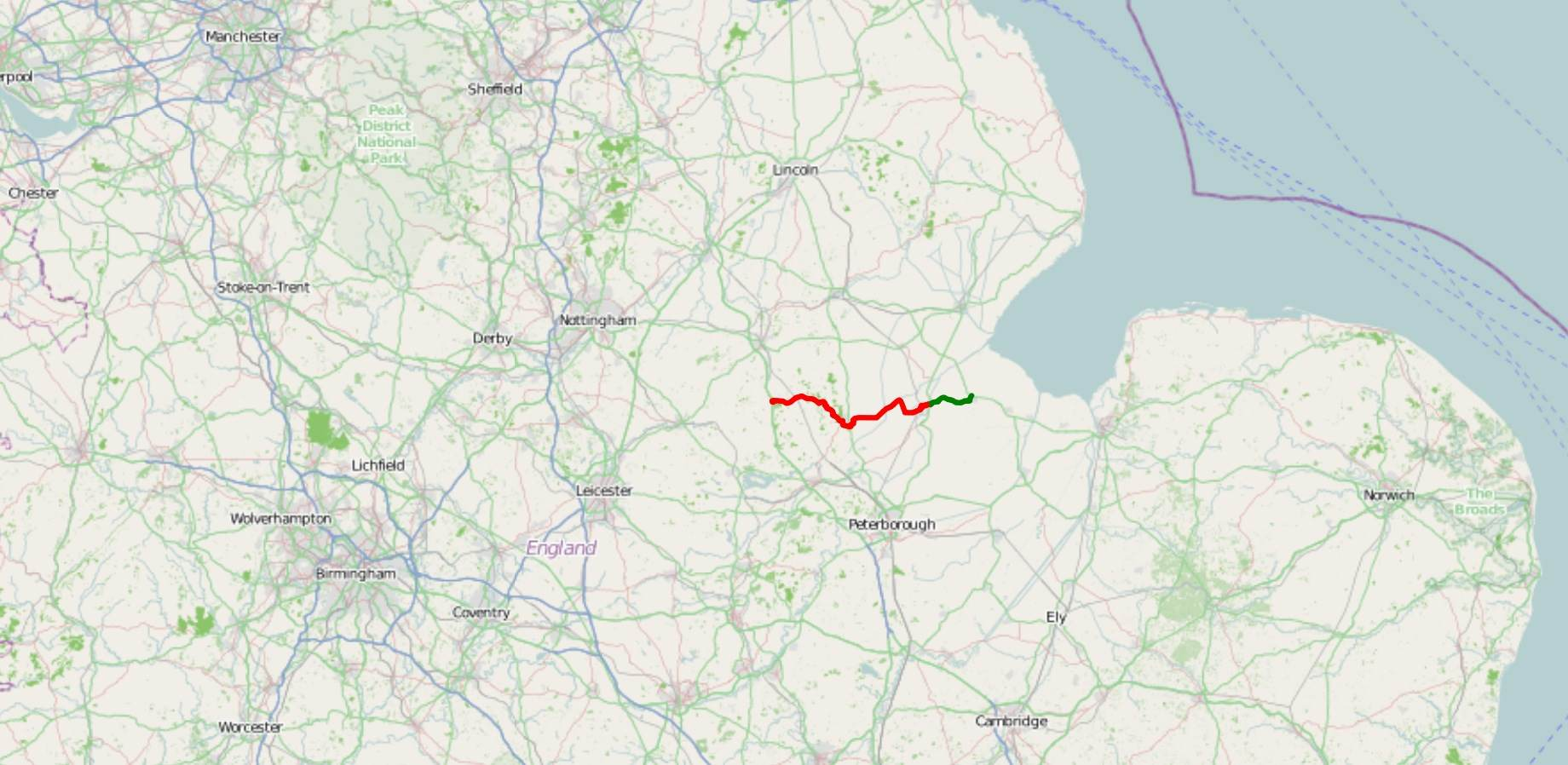
- Click map to enlarge

Major junctions
- From: Colsterworth
- A1 A6121; A15; A16; A17
- To: Holbeach

Location
- Country: United Kingdom

Road network
- Roads in the United Kingdom; Motorways; A and B road zones

The A151 road is relatively minor part of the British road system. It lies entirely in the county of Lincolnshire, England. Its western end lies at coordinates 52°48.1892′N 0°36.5179′W otherwise, grid reference SK938238. (Note: This is a British national grid reference. There are others on this page. Each six digit number places the feature concerned to within 100 metres.)

== The A151: summary ==
In the early 19th century, the A151 would have been called a cross-road (Note: Mogg, E. Paterson's Roads 18th edn. London. (1826)) since it runs across the pattern of these radial routes. As originally designated, it ran from the A15 at Bourne Market Place (TF095201), eastwards to Fleet Hargate, three kilometres east of Holbeach (TF393250), on the A17. Its present western section, between Colsterworth and Bourne, was part of the B676 road. (Note: Ordnance Survey.)

Road building and re-thinking of the road system have meant that nowadays, its western end is on the A1 near Colsterworth, in the administrative district of South Kesteven, (Note: grid reference SK938238) and its eastern end on the A17 near Holbeach, in the district of South Holland. (Note: grid reference TF350258) On the way, it passes to the north of Grimsthorpe Castle and at TF076200, just to the south of Bourne Woods. Then at TF095201, it bisects Bourne. It enters The Fens on the eastern edge of that small town. At TF154207, it passes through the hamlet of Twenty, in Bourne North Fen. At Guthram Gowt, it leaves Kesteven by crossing the South Forty-Foot Drain into the Parts of Holland. Spalding (TF245227), the principal town of South Holland, is also the main town on the A151 route. Across the River Welland, lie Moulton, then Holbeach, near which the A151 ends at the A17 (TF350258). That road leads on to King's Lynn and East Anglia.

== History: turnpike roads ==
As elsewhere, roads in England have developed over many years. Perhaps some of the A151 lies on lines which are pre-Roman. In other words, parts are two thousand or more years old. However, change is constant and little of the road is that old. In the nature of things, these changes are poorly or not at all documented, so will be treated generally, in that light, in an overview below. The historical part of the story begins with the turnpike roads.

The A151 was originally designated such in 1921. Then, the roads were much as they had been forty or fifty years before, under the turnpike trusts. Since the Second World War, there has been much building of by-passes and the like so that the precise lines have sometimes changed but they are still fundamentally the same. The main difference in the present case is that the road designation has been extended from the A15 at Bourne to the A1 at Colsterworth, while at the other end, the easternmost three kilometres have been replaced by a new part of the A17.

In the field of acts of Parliament founding turnpike trusts, much was happening locally in 1756. The Wansford to Stamford trust on the Great North Road had been set up in 1749 but in 1756, its sphere was extended through Stamford to Bourne. The last 1.6 kilometres of this road, as the trust left it, running down the hill to Bourne Market Place, are now part of the A151. It was freed from tolls on 1 November 1871. The half of this section which lies outside the modern town was probably built by the trust between 1756 and the Bourne enclosure awards of 1770–1. (Note: The enclosure field lay-out traverses the old road line as visible on the ground and in aerial photographs but is slightly influenced by it.)

The Lincoln Heath to Peterborough Trust was also established in 1756. Its remit included the forerunner of the present A15 which crosses the end of the Stamford road at Bourne Market Place. However, also included with this was the road from the Stamford road west of Bourne (a place known locally as Stamford Hill), (Note: grid reference TF079197 The line of the pre-turnpike road to Stamford can be seen in the hedge line south of the word Westfield and in the kink in the contour under the word. Return to the option list and select the old map option. It shows an additional field boundary on the line of the old road.) to Colsterworth. With the exception of the western extremity, in Colsterworth village, this is now part of the A151. It was freed from tolls on 1 November 1882.

The Lincoln Heath to Peterborough trust was organized in districts of which that covering the road from Colsterworth to Stamford Hill, Bourne was the ‘'West District'’. In 1860, it was re-grouped with the ‘'Middle District'’ which extended from Graby Bar (TF091295) to Market Deeping (TF138099). (Note: Graby Bar grid reference TF091295 to Market Deeping grid reference TF138099)

From Spalding, through Holbeach to Long Sutton, beyond the end of the modern A151, the road was turnpiked in 1764. It was freed from tolls on 1 November 1866. It may not be coincidental that this was the year of the final opening of the railway from Bourne to King's Lynn, the line having been opened in stages from 1858. This road was declared a main road by the Highways Act 1878.

The road from Bourne to Spalding was turnpiked in 1822 and freed from tolls in 1860. It was declared a main road by the Highways Act 1878. Before 1822, this section was in three parts. One led out from Bourne onto Bourne North Fen. The Spalding end led out from Spalding to the Spalding and Pinchbeck fen edge bank. The linking section was not officially a road. There was however, some droving traffic which was frowned upon by the drainage authorities, whose embankments it tended to erode. According to Cary's map of 1787, the official route ran via Tongue End (TF155188) and crossed the River Glen at Gurthram (TF173224).

=== Toll gates ===
The principal source of information about the positions of toll gates is the Ordnance Survey 1 inch map published in 1824. (Note: Apart from Friers Bar, these are all noted in Bennett, S. & Bennett, N. An Historical Atlas of Lincolnshire (1993) ISBN 0-85958-604-9.) It places them as follows:

- Corby Toll Bar. SK969234 (also 1834–6)
- T[urn] P[ike]. SK991247
- T P. TF062210 (also 1834–6)
- T P. TF079198 (also 1834-6 but there shown as on the Stamford road)
- Friers Bar. TF117206 (Exeter Estate book but no gate shown.)
- T P. TF169223 (corroborated by Paterson's Roads) (also 1834–6)
- T P. TF198244 (corroborated by Paterson's Roads) (also 1834–6)
- T P. TF2724 (also 1834-6 and the O.S. map of 1890 shows "The Gate" public house).
- T P. TF466217 (also 1834–6)

The six digit National Grid references of the marked positions on the 1824 map are taken from an equivalent modern map. The four digit references are much less accurate, being taken from an Ordnance Survey map by inspection of Wright Fig.3. The Ordnance Survey does not note the Friars Bar toll gate but in the Exeter Estate book, the position is called Friers Bar though no obstruction of the road by a gate is indicated. Paterson's Roads is a road book listing the features of roads and mileages from the ends of its itineraries, sequentially.

It is noticeable and a little surprising that according to the Ordnance Survey, it was possible in some cases to go a long way out of a town before coming to a toll gate. This is particularly noticeable eastwards from Spalding.

=== Condition of the turnpike roads ===
We have a few references to the condition of parts of the turnpike forerunners of the A151. Arthur Young's book on the Lincolnshire economy was published in 1813, while the first Fosdyke bridge was still under construction. He therefore, will have taken the future A151 between Spalding and Fleet Hargate on his journey from Boston to Wisbech. He wrote of it thus: In the Hundred of Skirbeck to Boston, and thence to Wisbeach, [turnpike roads] are generally made with silt, or old sea-sand, deposited under various parts of the country ages ago, and when moderately wet are very good; but dreadfully dusty and heavy in dry weather; and also on a thaw they are like mortar. Take the county in general, and they must be esteemed below par. What he is saying is that the turnpike roads in the Townlands were made of the same marine silt as forms the land itself in that part of the country. The heaviness in dry weather to which he refers, arose from the loose, deep, sandy surface through which wheels would have to be dragged.

According to Wheeler, 1 long ton (1.0 t) of silt was reckoned to cover 1 yard (0.91 m) in a length of a road, 18 inches (460 mm) thick and 10 feet (3.0 m) wide, the silt costing about 8d. to 10d. per ton for digging and spreading. In some cases the road was turned over. That is a pit was dug in the road until the silt was reached then that was dug out and formed into the carriageway. The surface of the next length was dug and put into the pit as a foundation then the silt dug and placed on top of it and so on along the road.

Gravel was used where obtainable and from about 1870, Wheeler introduced granite. By the end of the 20th century granite and slag were being consolidated by steam roller Of the Bourne to Colsterworth road, Young said we were every moment either buried in quagmires of mud or racked to dislocation over pieces of rock which they term mending. Materials and methods for repairing fenland roads are described by Wheeler. The best material available was dug locally from pits.

== Terrain ==
When roads are built by engineers with capital to support their work, they are successfully able to build roads across difficult soils. Modern road builders have less need to seek out easy geological conditions. When roads were made not by civil engineers but by people walking on the ground, the road followed the soils which were found to be easiest under foot. The A151 passes across two types of country, the upland and the fen. The highest point on it lies within a kilometre of its western end at 123 metres above mean sea level. It then passes across a gently sloping dissected plateau of Jurassic rocks capped in its highest parts by glacial clay. After about 16 kilometres, it enters the fen and is soon at about two metres, rising to three, nearer the coast.

== Description ==
=== Western End ===
Having for some time, extended its influence by diplomacy and trade, (Note: Salway, P. Roman Britain, Oxford University Press. (1981) ISBN 0-19-821717-X. Ch.3. and Frere, S. Britannia 3rd edn. Ch.3. (1967)) The Roman Empire began to take control in Britain from the year 43. An important part of the means of control was the building of soundly-built roads, running directly between key places. (Note: Frere. (1987) Ch.4.) This led the engineers to overcome all but the greatest obstacles rather than going round them. One result of this was that they built roads on soils which others would have avoided. When the Roman authorities had withdrawn from Britain and their roads wore out, people began to wander from the Roman road lines where they could find a more secure footing by taking another line. (Note: Soils of England and Wales, Sheet 4. Soil Survey of England and Wales. (1983))

The Roman equivalent of the A1 was built to a very high standard, during the early years of Roman rule in Britain. The English successors of the Romans in Britain, called this road Ermine Street from their word for "soldier", compare the German personal name, Herman. (Note: Virtue's Simplified Dictionary, Encyclopedic Edition. (c.1930). Its Latinized form, Arminius, is the name normally used outside German-speaking countries, for the victor over Varus at the Teutoburgerwald in AD9CE. Augé, C. Nouveau Petit Larousse Illustré, Paris, (1934).) The twenty kilometre length of Ermine Street, at roughly the centre of which, the line of the A151 lies, passed over chalky till (boulder clay) which is very sticky when wet. As the Ermine Street carriageway broke up, people sought easier going by moving down towards the small River Witham whose valley had been eroded through the till, into the Jurassic limestone below it.

Thus, in 1756 when the Colsterworth to Bourne road was turnpiked, (Note: Birkbeck, J.D. A History of Bourne (1976). pp. 68–9, corroborated by Grigg, D. The Agricultural Revolution in South Lincolnshire, Cambridge University Press (1966). Fig.6.) the toll road which was to become the A151 began at the crossroads in Colsterworth, further west than it now does, though the first toll gate noted by the 1824 Ordnance Survey map was about three kilometres from there. When the Colsterworth bypass was built, its southern half was placed virtually on the Ermine Street line so that now, while the A151 still begins at the A1, it is not at the old Great North Road but at Ermine Street, on the chalky till soil that we start our journey. Bourne Road, Colsterworth, the section removed from the A151, remains part of the B676, the road which leads westwards, towards Melton Mowbray. (Note: Great Britain road numbering scheme)

Once the clutter associated with a trunk road junction is left behind, the road passes through agricultural land and woods. To the north are fairly level fields and to the south, Twyford Wood, which cloaks the remains of North Witham airfield. (Note: Ordnance Survey and Bomber County.)

=== Corby Glen ===
At the end of the wood, we leave Colsterworth parish. Three kilometres from the start, at the hamlet of Birkholme, the road finds a shallow valley formed by erosion which has cut through the till and exposed the underlying Jurassic limestone soils. Here, the 1824 map shows our first toll gate, Corby Toll Bar. (Note: Ordnance Survey, David & Charles Edn.) The road follows this valley, under the railway main line, past the second toll gate site at the junction with the Boothby Pagnel road (B1176), then down to the River Glen at Corby Glen, where it turns a little southwards to avoid more glacial till and keep to the upper Lincolnshire limestone. (Note: Geological Survey, 1 inch, sheet 143 Drift Edn.) The land between Colsterworth and the western edge of Bourne is a plateau, gently sloping down to the east and much dissected by erosion during periods when it was near but not under ice caps. The River Glen which we crossed at Corby Glen is also called the West Glen and is in one of the two main dissecting valleys. (Note: Ordnance Survey.) East of Corby Glen, we are on a strip of un-dissected plateau. The surface dips very gently towards the east but the geological strata dip more steeply so that a kilometre out of Corby Glen, the road passes onto the strata above the limestone, known as the Upper Estuarine Series, the Blisworth Limestone, Blisworth clay, Cornbrash and Kellaways clay, in that order.

=== Edenham ===
At Irnham crossroads, (Note: grid reference TF032241) the A151 leaves Corby Glen parish for that of Edenham and is back down on the cornbrash. To the north, unseen in its little valley beyond the woods is Irnham, once the home of Sir Geoffrey Luttrell, who commissioned the Luttrell Psalter, (Note: Camille, M. Mirror in Parchment (1998) ISBN 1-86189-023-0.) a book which tells us so much of English everyday life in the 14th century. (Note: . (If you are using broadband, navigate on, to the bigger version). If this link is unsatisfactory try)

The road dips into the valley of the stream which flows on to form the lake in Grimsthorpe Park. Just skirting the glacial till, it rises to the crest at the other side, on the Kellaways clay and sand and turns sharply left onto the till. It used to go straight on and pass the north front of Grimsthorpe Castle. When the soil in the field beyond the bend is bare, its course can still be seen. The castle's owner did a deal with the turnpike trustees. He brought land on the other side of the road into his park and built them a new, though longer road around it. Once the semi-circular diversion is completed, the road turns sharp left again, through Grimsthorpe where it is on Jurassic clay. The 1824 Ordnance Survey map shows both the old and the new roads.

At Grimsthorpe village, the A151 is in the second of the main valleys dissecting the plateau, that of the East Glen river. From its association with Edenham, this river is often called the Eden. The West and East Glens join near Wilsthorpe, at grid reference TF0913. Through Grimsthorpe and Edenham, there are numerous bends and winds across the small exposures Jurassic soils, glacial gravel and alluvium, until the road climbs out of the valley over the till-capped ridge which separates Edenham parish from Bourne. On the glacial clay soil of the till, it passes between woods, including Bourne Wood. (Note: Soil Survey.)

=== Bourne ===
As the road arrives back on the Jurassic clay, it meets the A6121, a road designation which ends here, having begun at Morcott, grid reference SK926004 in Rutland, on the other side of the A1, hence its beginning with the digit 6. In 1824, there was a toll gate here. The course of the A151 is directly down the slope into Bourne. It is clear archaeologically that the road used to run parallel with this and about 200 metres to the south. Historically, there appears to be no commonly available record as to when the move was made. It was certainly in two stages. The move of the upper part was probably made in the 18th century; the lower, in about 1140, when Bourne castle was built across it. Its present course is dictated by the former presence of Bourne Castle at the town end and by a desire to keep to the crest of a slight ridge in the hillside. (Note: This comes from careful observation of the archaeology over 25 years but it is not published.)

It is towards the top of this section that it is possible to detect a change in slope betraying the former presence of a shore of the Devensian periglacial lake, which was impounded by the ice into the Fenland basin. It was more evident but the declivity of the road has been smoothed out a little. (Note: Poznanski (1960). The altitude of the shore is given by that of the spillway on the Norfolk/Suffolk border (26 metres final height, plus depth of water/ice over the spillway). The beach and low cliff of the shore are clearly seen in several places at just above 30 metres. For example, grid reference TF079209, or grid reference TF090170.)

Much more modern, is the bypass road which joins from the south at the entrance to the town and just below the level of the surface of the former lake. This opened for use on 8 October 2005. In the town, the A151 passes immediately outside the castle site, along the latter's northern edge. However the plots along this side of the road were first laid out for houses in around 1280, so that the castle is no longer casually apparent. (Note: grid reference TF087199.)

At Bourne Market Place, the A151 crosses the A15. This road used to be part of the Lincoln Heath to Peterborough turnpike road, whose act of parliament is dated 1756. It was this trust which, in 1820, demolished the old town hall which used to stand in the street here.

At the junction, the road to the north led directly form the main gate of the castle. The market place was positioned immediately across a moat and a pomœrium, outside the gate but those are no longer visible from the road. However, our road continues not straight ahead but on a 45° angle toward the south. This bend arose because it passed around the perimeter of the pomœrium until it met the road leading eastwards from the gate. As the A151 reaches this, it turns back through 45° and continues eastwards along that approach road, across the line of the Roman version of the A15, King Street and past the Abbey Lawn. This is now a picturesque cricket ground, but was an 18th-century sheep lawn. (Note: The gentry's equivalent of a deer park. In this case it was set up by George Pochin in 1764 or soon after. Birkbeck, J.D. A History of Bourne, (1976) p. 71.) Soon, the road leaves the 12th century, Norman road, heading towards the pre-Norman town. On arrival, it turns eastwards again, at the same time as crossing the now-buried course of the Car Dyke and onto the fen-edge gravel. This is material which drifted down the slope which we have followed, while it was under the water of the Devensian periglacial lake.

The Car Dyke is generally taken as the boundary of The Fens, though here, it heralds the more commercial part of the town. At once, the road passes the former works of BRM, the Formula One motor racing Constructors' Champion in 1962. The firm is gone but it has left an engineering tradition in the town. Shortly, the road turns north-eastwards, following the bank of the Roman artificial river across the fen, the Old Ea. At the edge of the town, it turns away from the now hidden river bed, almost eastwards across the black, humic soil of Bourne North Fen. Here we begin to see The Fens as the region more typically is, a broad, nearly flat, agricultural land.

At grid reference TF118207, the road turns due eastwards at Friar Bar, where to judge by its name, at one stage was a toll bar. The Ordnance Survey does not note it but on the Exeter Estate book, (Note: The Estate Agent's book recording ownership of property in Bourne Parish and Morton. It is dated 1826/7 and is owned by Bourne Civic Society. Presumably, this name refers to a toll bar of some period up to the 1820s.) it is called Friers Bar. The road from Bourne to Spalding had been turnpiked in 1822, after the survey had begun. So it looks as though the Ordnance Survey had overlooked it. From here, the road runs 3.5 km, straight to Twenty.

The Car Dyke marked the western boundary of the royal forest decreed, by one of the Norman kings. It extended south and east, across the fens to the Welland. There seems to be no precise agreement as to when the land was disafforested. It was somewhere between 1190 and 1230. (Note: Birkbeck, p. 17., says 1207, by Richard I. Varley, J. The Parts of Kesteven Studies in Law and Local Government, Kesteven County Council (1974), p. 2., puts it at 1230. Wheeler, W.H. A History of the Fens of South Lincolnshire (1896) facsimile Edn. Paul Watkins, Stamford. (1990) ISBN 1-871615-19-4. p. 245. credits Richard I who reigned from 1189 to 1199, but Wheeler places the event in the 13th century. The first version of Magna Carta was signed in 1215. Hindley, D. The Book of the Magna Carta Guild Publishing. (1990) p. 91., places the Forest Charter in 1217.) The obvious occasion was the signing of Magna Carta in 1215 or perhaps, on one of its re-issues. That document mentions King John's afforestations.

Roads on the black soils tend to crumble at the edges as the soft humus collapses and oxidises. This road is typical of fen roads, in needing frequent attention to deal with that. It is typical too, in that it rises and falls as it passes over the silt banks left amongst the peat by small to medium marine creeks from the Middle Bronze Age, 3 to 3½ thousand years ago. This was before the peat in the soil was laid down.

In the black fens, the buildings are virtually always to be found on these old creeks, known as roddons. The many small roddons in Bourne North Fen merge at Twenty. There, the road uses part of this larger roddon by turning along it towards Guthram. Nowadays, this place is called Guthram Gowt but until the steam drainage engine was erected there, in 184?, it was Guthram Cote.

In the late medieval period, people lived on the fen edge and the Townlands but the fens themselves were thinly populated. There were however, a few comparatively grand establishments called Halls, Neslam Hall at grid reference TF1732, for example. It was a grange of Sempringham Priory on the site of the modern Mornington House round which the district boundary is still diverted as it was when the abbey, on the Kesteven fen edge, owned it. There were more but still rather few smaller dwellings called cotes. Moors Cote lay in Bourne North Fen, to the south-east of Twenty and Guthram Cote stood on the boundary between Kesteven and Holland, on an island of Devensian deposits, the Abbey sand and gravel. The road book, Paterson's Roads, of 1826, lists a toll gate at Guthram Cote, a distance of 5 1/4 miles (8.4 km) from Bourne. Just to the east of this was the bridge over what it calls the South Forty-Foot Eau(15).

=== Pinchbeck ===
The Kesteven-Holland boundary is formed by the South Forty-Foot Drain, the main land drain of the Black Sluice Level. The present layout of the drainage dates from the Parliament of Great Britain's Preservation of Fish and Conies Act of 1765 but this part of the South Forty foot is a re-use of one of the main drains of the Lindsey Level, a scheme which was declared complete in 1638. On the other side, in Pinchbeck North Fen, the road begins to wind, something quite unusual in these fens. It was laid out on the bank of a soak dike called the Weir Dike, which was cut in about 1600. In Pinchbeck North Fen, the dike is now largely defunct. The instructions stipulated that it should be at a distance of 100 feet (33M) from the bank of the River Glen. As the river bank meandered a little, so the road does(13).

The river is the one the A151 crosses at Corby Glen and Edenham. Here the two parts are combined. Beyond the Glen, to the south, is an area of dense Romano-British occupation. On this side, a little is known but if there is more, it is covered with post-Roman marine silt(14). It looks as though this part of the river began as a single sea bank, keeping the tide out of Pinchbeck South Fen but allowing it into the lower part of that area behind the townland to the north of the road. In the late Roman or early post-Roman period, the Glen escaped from its artificial Roman course of which the Bourne Old Ea was part. (The road follows the bank of this while leaving Bourne) and found its way to these tidal flats. Later, at some early but unknown medieval date, the marsh was turned into a polder of sorts and the Glen was directed along the old sea bank which then became one of the river banks. Thus, the course of the road was determined ultimately, by that of the sea bank.

The River Glen will have been in the phase when it flowed into the tidal marsh, with its mouth at Guthram, at around 500, the time when the unknown writer who goes under the name of Nennius tells us that King Arthur fought his first battle against the English settlers at the mouth of the River Glein. See Historia Britonum numbered paragraph 3. See also Sites and places associated with Arthurian legend.
