= Ditch =

Small to moderate trench created to channel water

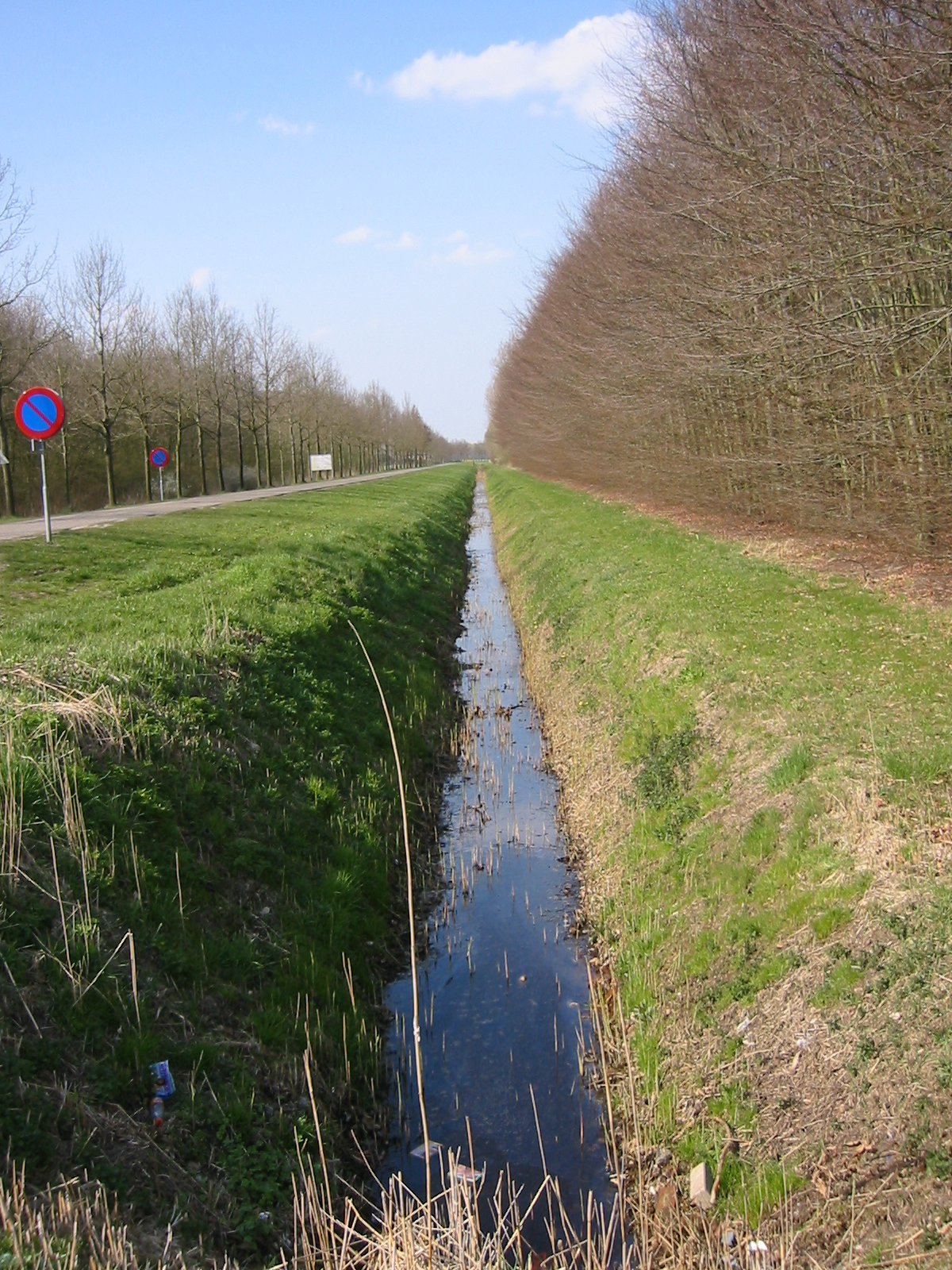
A ditch in the Netherlands

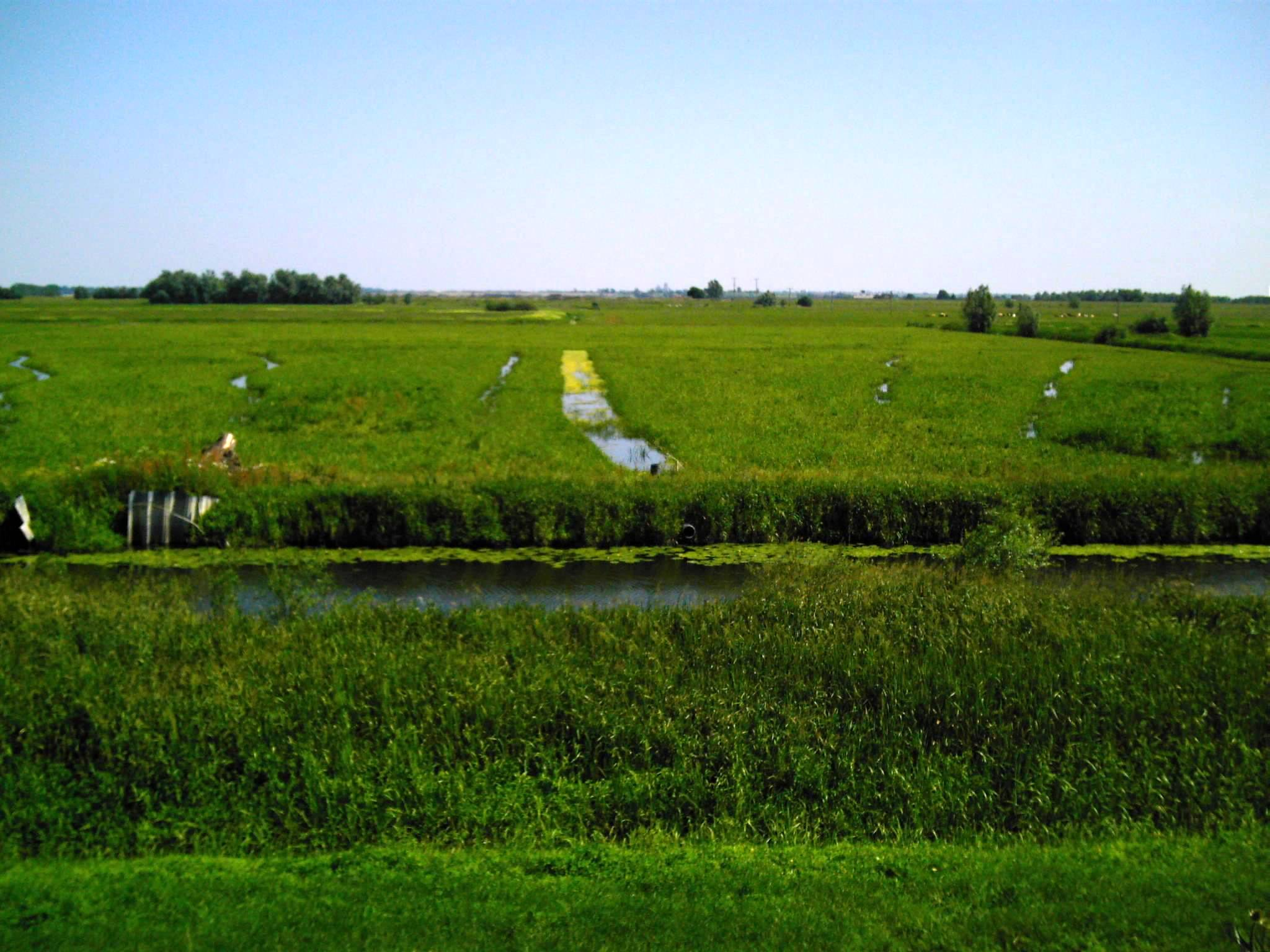
Ditches at the Ouse Washes nature reserve.

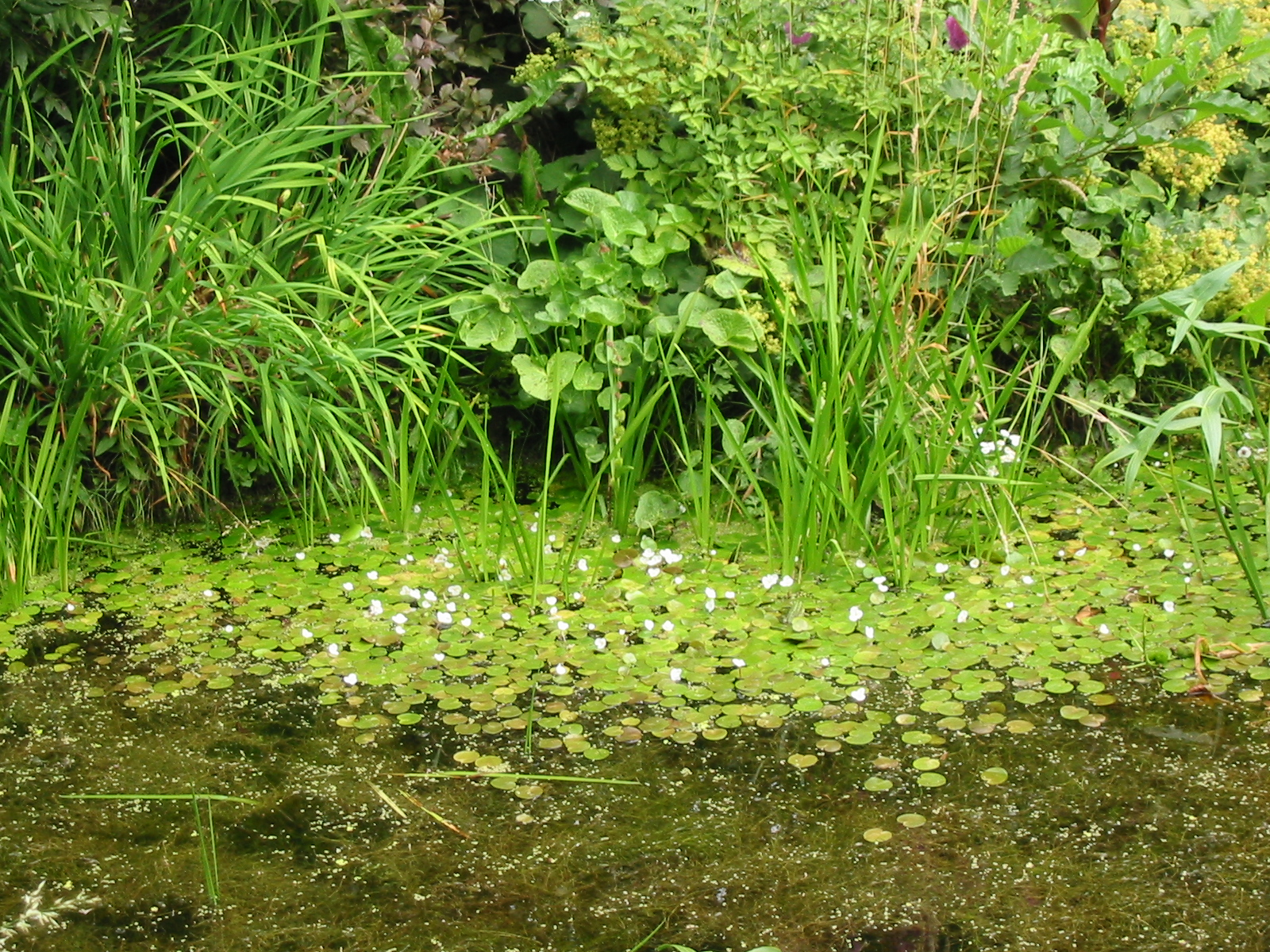
Waterplants growing in a ditch in the Netherlands, showing Sagittaria sagittifolia to the right.

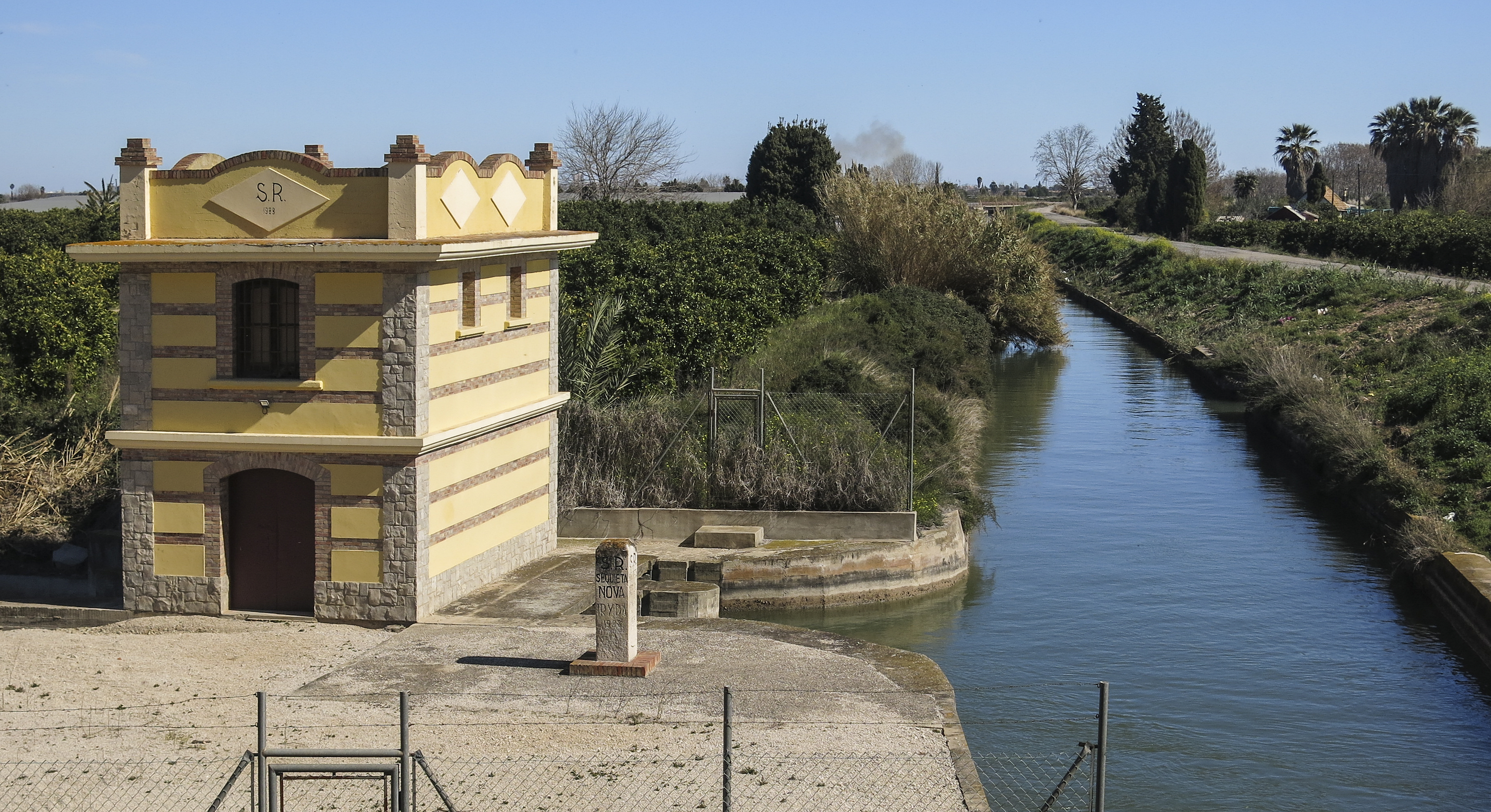
Major ditch of Sueca, Valencian Community

A ditch is a small-to-moderate size trench created to channel water. A ditch can be used for drainage, to drain water from low-lying areas, alongside roadways or fields, or to channel water from a more distant source for plant irrigation. Ditches are commonly seen around farmland, especially in areas that have required drainage, such as The Fens in eastern England and much of the Netherlands.

Roadside ditches may provide a hazard to motorists and cyclists, whose vehicles may crash into them and get damaged, flipped over, or stuck and cause major injury, especially in poor weather conditions and rural areas.

== Etymology ==
In Anglo-Saxon, the word dïc already existed and was pronounced [diːk] ("deek") in northern England and [diːtʃ] ("deetch") in the south. The origins of the word lie in digging a trench and forming the upcast soil into a bank alongside it. This practice has meant that the name dïc was given to either the excavation or the bank, and evolved to both the words "dike"/"dyke" and "ditch".

Thus Offa's Dyke is a combined structure and Car Dyke is a trench, though it once had raised banks as well. In the English Midlands and East Anglia, a dyke is what a ditch is in the south of England, a property-boundary marker or drainage channel. Where it carries a stream, it may be called a running dike as in Rippingale Running Dike, which leads water from the catchwater drain, Car Dyke, to the South Forty Foot Drain in Lincolnshire (TF1427). The Weir Dike is a soak dike in Bourne North Fen, near Twenty and alongside the River Glen.

== Sustainability of drainage ditches ==
Drainage ditches play major roles in agriculture throughout the world. Improper drainage systems accelerate water contamination, excessively desiccate soils during seasonal drought, and become a financial burden to maintain. Industrial earth-moving equipment facilitates maintenance of straight drainage trenches, but entrenchment results in increasing environmental and eventually profound economic costs over time.

Sustainable channel design can result in ditches that are largely self-maintaining due to natural geomorphological equilibrium. Slowed net siltation and erosion result in net reduction in sediment transport. Encouraging development of a natural stream sinuosity and a multi-terraced channel cross section appear to be key to maintain both peak ditch drainage capacity, and minimum net pollution and nutrient transport.

Flooding can be a major cause of recurring crop loss—particularly in heavy soils—and can severely disrupt urban economies as well. Subsurface drainage to ditches offers a way to remove excess water from agricultural fields, or vital urban spaces, without the erosion rates and pollution transport that results from direct surface runoff. However, excess drainage results in recurring drought induced crop yield losses and more severe urban heat island or desiccation issues.

Controlled subsurface drainage from sensitive areas to vegetated drainage ditches makes possible a better balance between water drainage and water retention needs. The initial investment allows a community to draw down local water tables when and where necessary without exacerbating drought problems at other times.

== Water diversion ditches ==
Particularly in Colorado, the term ditch is also applied to open aqueducts that traverse hillsides as part of transbasin diversion projects.

Examples include the Grand Ditch over La Poudre Pass, the Berthoud Pass Ditch, and the Boreas Pass Ditch.

== Herbicides ==
Herbicides may be used to maintain a ditch. Primarily this is done to deny refuge to weeds that would progress into the adjacent field, but may instead involve only broadleaf herbicides specifically to produce forage and/or hay.

== For forage and hay ==
Ditches can provide forage or be harvested for hay. If herbicides are used, however, the resulting manure cannot necessarily be used in crop fields, because in some cases herbicides will pass through and produce crop injury.

== See also ==
- Acequia
- Canal
- Culvert
- Drainage system (agriculture)
- Irrigation
- Nullah
- Rhyne
- Trench
- Watertable control
