= Paterson (surname) =

Origin
- Origin: Norwegian Petersen (son of Peter)
- Meaning: Fathers Son / Son of Patrick
- Region of origin: Scotland, Ireland

Other names
- Variant form: Patterson

Paterson is a Scottish and Irish surname meaning "Father's son" or "son of Patrick". In Connacht, and Ulster, the name is considered to be an Anglicised form of the Irish language surname Ó Casáin. Paterson is rarely used as a given name. There are other spellings, including Patterson. Notable people with the surname include:

- Adrian Paterson, South African-Australian nuclear scientist
- Aileen Paterson (1934–2018), Scottish children's writer
- Andrew Paterson (disambiguation), multiple people
- Alasdair Paterson, Scottish poet
- Alex Paterson (born 1959), English musician
- Alexander Paterson (1844–1908), Australian politician
- Sir Alexander Paterson (1884–1947), British prison reformer
- Algy Paterson (died 1995), Australian last speaker of the Martuthunira language
- Andrew J. Paterson (born 1952), Canadian artist
- Archie Paterson (1908–1995), Scottish footballer
- Banjo Paterson (1864–1941), Australian poet
- Barbara Paterson (born 1935), Canadian sculptor
- Basil A. Paterson (1926–2014), New York politician
- Bill Paterson (footballer, born 1897) (1897–1970), Scottish footballer
- Bill Paterson (footballer, born 1930) (1930–2002), Scottish footballer
- Bill Paterson (actor) (born 1945), Scottish actor
- Callum Paterson (born 1994), Scottish footballer
- Charles Paterson (cricketer) (1882–1973), Scottish cricketer
- Chris Paterson (born 1978), Scottish rugby union player
- Chris Paterson (rugby league) (born 1980), Australian rugby league player
- Craig Paterson (born 1959), Scottish footballer
- Colin Paterson (born 1974), Scottish journalist and broadcaster
- Cory Paterson (born 1987), Australian rugby league player
- David Paterson (born 1954), American politician, Governor of New York
- Don Paterson (born 1963), Scottish poet, writer and musician
- Emma Paterson (1848–1886), English feminist and trade unionist
- Fred Paterson (1897–1977), Australian politician
- Gil Paterson (born 1942), Scottish politician
- Helen Paterson, birth name of Helen Allingham (1848–1926), British painter
- Iain Paterson (born 1973), Scottish baritone
- Isabel Paterson (1886–1961), Canadian libertarian writer
- Jack Paterson (disambiguation), multiple people
- James Paterson (disambiguation), multiple people
- James Hamilton-Paterson (born 1941), British novelist and poet
- Jamie Paterson (disambiguation), several people
- Jennifer Paterson (1928–1999), British television chef
- Jodi Ann Paterson (born 1975), American model and actress
- John Paterson (disambiguation), multiple people
- Katherine Paterson (born 1932), American children's writer
- Keith Paterson (born 1931), British Internet celebrity
- Lee Paterson (born 1981), British rugby league footballer
- Lloyd H. Paterson (1925–1988), New York politician
- Marr Paterson (1887–?), Scottish footballer
- Markus Paterson (born 1998), British-Filipino actor, singer, television host, and footballer
- Martin Paterson (born 1987), British football player and coach
- Matthew C. Paterson (died 1846), American lawyer and politician from New York
- Meg Paterson, fictional character in British TV series Monarch of the Glen
- Mike Paterson (born 1942), British computer scientist
- Neil Paterson (disambiguation), multiple people
- Owen Paterson (born 1956), British politician
- Owen Paterson, Australian production designer on The Matrix films
- Rex Paterson (1902–1978), English agricultural pioneer
- Robert Paterson (disambiguation), multiple people
- Stan Paterson (1924–2013), British glaciologist
- Tania Paterson (born 1972), New Zealand competitive diver
- Thomas Paterson (disambiguation), multiple people
- Tim Paterson (born 1956), American computer programmer, author of MS-DOS
- Tom Paterson, Scottish comics artist
- Viola Paterson (1899–1981), Scottish painter, wood engraver and colour woodcut artist
- William Paterson (disambiguation), multiple people

== See also ==
- Paterson (given name)
- Patterson (surname)
