= Thomas Paterson (disambiguation) =

Thomas Paterson (1882–1952) was an Australian farmer and politician.

Thomas Paterson may also refer to:

- Thomas Macdonald-Paterson (1844–1906), Australian politician
- Thomas J. Paterson (1805–1885), United States politician
- Thomas Paterson (British Army officer) (1780–1856), Scottish military officer
- Thomas Wilson Paterson (1851–1921), Lieutenant Governor of British Columbia
- Tom Paterson, Scottish comic artist
- Thomas Paterson (footballer) (1874–?), Scottish association footballer
- Tom Paterson (footballer) (1874–1945), Australian rules footballer for Collingwood
- Tommy Paterson (born 1954), English former footballer
- T. T. Paterson (Thomas Thomson Paterson, 1909–1994), curator of the Museum of Archaeology and Anthropology, University of Cambridge
- Thomas G. Paterson (born 1941) American historian

== See also ==
- Thomas Patterson (disambiguation)
