= Daniel Patterson =

Daniel Patterson may refer to:

- Daniel Patterson (naval officer) (1786–1839), officer in the United States Navy
- Daniel Patterson (chef) (fl. 1980s–2020s), American chef, restaurateur, and food writer
- Daniel Patterson (volleyball) (born 1947), American former volleyball player
- Daniel J. Patterson (1857–?), American architect
- Dan Patterson (born 1960), British television producer and writer
- Daniel Patterson (politician) (born 1962), member of the Arizona House of Representatives
- Daniel Patterson (fl. 1850s–1870s), dentist and second husband of Mary Baker Eddy
- Danny Patterson (born 1971), American baseball player

== See also ==
- Daniel Paterson (1739–1825), British Army officer and cartographer
