= Paul Patterson =

Paul Patterson may refer to:

- Paul Patterson (neuroscientist) (1943–2014), American neuroscientist
- Paul L. Patterson (1900–1956), American politician
- Paul Patterson (footballer) (born 1965), Australian rules footballer
- Paul Patterson (American football) (1927–1982), American football player
- Paul Patterson (composer) (born 1947), British composer
- Paul Patterson (comics), comic book character

== See also ==
- Paul Patterson Timman (born 1972), American artist
- Paul L. Patterson Elementary School, an American elementary school
- Patterson (surname)
