= Patrick Patterson =

Patrick Patterson may refer to:

- Patrick Patterson (basketball) (born 1989), American professional basketball player
- Patrick Patterson (cricketer) (born 1961), retired Jamaican cricket player
- Paddy Patterson (born 1998), Irish rugby union player

== See also ==
- Pat Patterson (disambiguation)
