= Michael Paterson (disambiguation) =

Michael Paterson may refer to:

- Michael Paterson, New Zealand born rugby union player
- Mike Paterson, British computer scientist

== See also ==
- Michael Patterson (disambiguation)
