= Paterson (given name) =

- Gender: Male

Origin
- Meaning: "son of Patrick"
- Region of origin: Scotland

Paterson is a Scottish given name meaning "son of Patrick". It is more commonly used as a surname. People with the given name Paterson include:

- Paterson Ewen (1925 - 2002), Canadian painter
- Paterson Joseph (born 1964), British actor
- T. Paterson Ross (died 1957), American architect

== See also ==
- Paterson (surname)
