= Jerry Patterson =

Jerry Patterson may refer to:

- Jerry E. Patterson (born 1946), former Commissioner of the General Land Office of Texas
- Jerry L. Patterson (fl. 1970s–2000s), American author of five gambling related books
- Jerry M. Patterson (1934–2024), American politician from California

== See also ==
- Jeremy Patterson (born c. 1985), perpetrator of the 2017 Sandy, Utah attack
- Gerald Patterson (1895–1967), tennis player
