= Pat Patterson (disambiguation) =

Pat Patterson (1941–2020) was a Canadian-American wrestler.

Pat Patterson may also refer to:

- Pat Patterson (American football) (1889–1987), American college football player at Georgia Tech
- Pat Patterson (infielder, born 1897) (1897–1977), for the New York Giants
- Pat Patterson (infielder, born 1911) (1911–1984), American Negro league infielder
- Pat Patterson (coach) (1934–2007), Louisiana Tech University coach
- Pat Patterson (footballer) (born 1946), Australian rules footballer
- Pat Patterson (politician) (born 1948), Florida politician
- Chad Slivenski (born 1972), American professional wrestler formerly known as Pat Patterson Jr.
- Joseph H. Patterson (1912–1939), American hurdler who went by "Pat Patterson" while in the Navy

== See also ==
- Pat Paterson (1910–1978), actress
- Patrick Patterson (disambiguation)
- Patterson (surname)
