= Daniel Patterson (volleyball) =

American volleyball player (born 1947)

Medal record

Men's volleyball

Representing the United States

Pan American Games
Gold medal – first place	1967 Winnipeg	Team
Silver medal – second place	1971 Cali	Team

Daniel Edward Patterson (born January 21, 1947, in Pasadena, California) is a former American volleyball player who competed in the 1968 Summer Olympics.
