= Simon Patterson =

Simon Patterson may refer to:

- Simon Patterson (artist) (born 1967), English artist
- Simon Patterson (footballer) (1982–2006), English footballer
