= Twenty, Lincolnshire =

Village in Lincolnshire, England

Coordinates: 52.7711°N 0.2909°W

Twenty
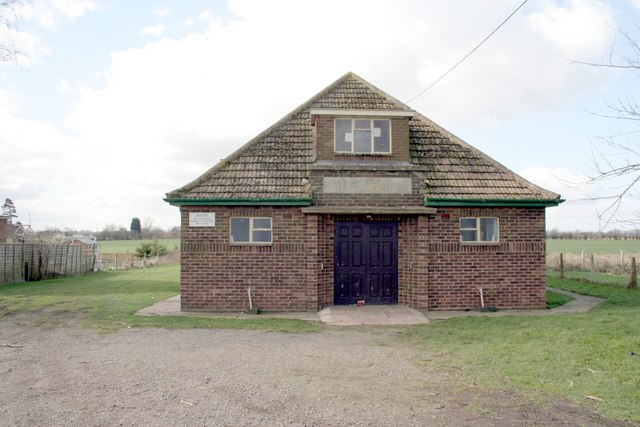
- The Village Hall, Twenty

- Location within Lincolnshire
- OS grid reference: TF153207
  - London: 90 mi (140 km) S
- District: South Kesteven
- Shire county: Lincolnshire
- Region: East Midlands
- Country: England
- Sovereign state: United Kingdom
- Post town: BOURNE
- Postcode district: PE10
- Dialling code: 01778
- Police: Lincolnshire
- Fire: Lincolnshire
- Ambulance: East Midlands
- UK Parliament: Grantham and Bourne

Twenty is a village in the South Kesteven district of Lincolnshire, England. It is situated approximately 3 miles (5 km) east of Bourne, and 5 miles (8 km) west of Spalding.

== Location ==
Twenty is situated on the A151 road, possibly originally a Roman road or Norman causeway, a road today notable for the very deep drainage dyke that runs alongside it. Nearby are Guthram Gowt and West Pinchbeck. Immediately to the south is the River Glen.

No separate population statistic is available for Twenty. The best available report lumps together Dyke, Twenty, South Fen and Spalding Road outside Bourne, with a total of 495, with Dyke being the largest.

== Modern drainage ==
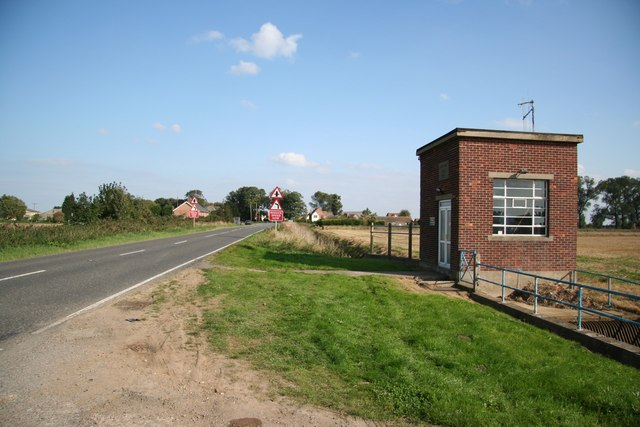
The pumping station with the village in the background

The area falls within the drainage area of the Black Sluice Internal Drainage Board. They maintain a small electric pumping station to the west of the crossroads, called Twenty Pumping Station

== See also ==
- List of places with numeric names
