= Thomas Paterson (British Army officer) =

Scottish lieutenant-general

- Born: 1780
- Died: 13 June 1856 (aged 75–76); Woolwich
- Occupation: Lieutenant-general

Thomas Paterson (1780 – 13 June 1856) was a Scottish lieutenant-general.

== Biography ==
Paterson was the son of Robert Paterson of Plewlands, Ayrshire. He entered the Royal Artillery as second lieutenant 1 December 1795. After serving in Canada and the West Indies from 1796 to 1804, and becoming second captain 19 July 1804, he took part in the expedition to Copenhagen under Lord Cathcart in 1807. He was attached to Baird's division, and after the army had landed it fell to him to keep the Danish gunboats in check with his 9-pounders, while batteries were being thrown up for the bombardment. He became captain 1 February 1808, and in the following year he served in the Walcheren expedition. He was given a brevet majority 4 June 1814, and became lieutenant-colonel in the regiment 6 November 1827, and colonel 10 January 1837. In 1836 he was made superintendent of the Royal Military Repository at Woolwich. He was promoted major-general 9 November 1846, and lieutenant-general 30 June 1854, having become a colonel-commandant of the Royal Artillery 15 August 1850. He died at Woolwich on 13 June 1856.
