= Thomas Paterson (footballer) =

Scottish footballer

Personal information
- Date of birth: 1874
- Place of birth: Quarter, Scotland
- Position: Outside right

Senior career*
Years	Team	Apps	(Gls)
- Motherwell
1895–1896	Burnley	7	(3)
1896–1897	Abercorn	3	(0)
- * Club domestic league appearances and goals

Thomas Paterson (born 1874, deceased) was a Scottish professional footballer who played as an outside right.
