= Idelle Patterson =

American singer

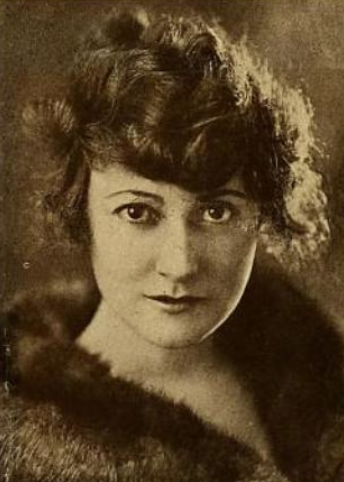
- Idelle Patterson, from a 1926 publication
- Born: Alma Idelle Sprague; September 26, 1880; Illinois, U.S.
- Died: February 29, 1968; New Fairfield, Connecticut, U.S.
- Other names: Idelle Baggs
- Occupation: Singer

Alma Idelle Sprague Patterson Baggs (September 26, 1880 – February 29, 1968) was an American soprano singer.

== Career ==
Patterson, who was born Alma Idelle Sprague in Illinois, was in the New York City cast of Adelaide with David Bispham in 1915. In 1919, she replaced Anna Fitziu as Nedda in Pagliacci on a day's notice, and she headlined at music festivals in Ohio, Maine, and Florida. She sang at Carnegie Hall in 1918, 1919 and 1920, and gave a recital at Aeolian Hall in 1922, accompanied by her husband. She toured the American West in 1925, and the Pacific Coast in the 1926–1927 season. She was a member of the Jolliffe Quartet.

Patterson made several recordings for the Columbia label between 1910 and 1913, and one recording for the Victor label, in 1921. She also sang on radio programs in the 1920s. She was considered a prospect for a film career, having "in addition to her musical talent much more than the average share of good looks and personality". An Oklahoma newspaper commented on her intelligence and sense of humor in 1924.

== Personal life ==
Sprague married singer and vocal teacher Alfred Russ Patterson in 1903. Her first husband died in May 1945, and she married Ralph Leonard Baggs in December 1945. Her second husband was a businessman who served in the Connecticut legislature. She died in 1968, at the age of 87, in New Fairfield, Connecticut.
