= Bourne Woods =

Woods near Bourne, Lincolnshire, England

Coordinates: 52°46′N 0°24′W

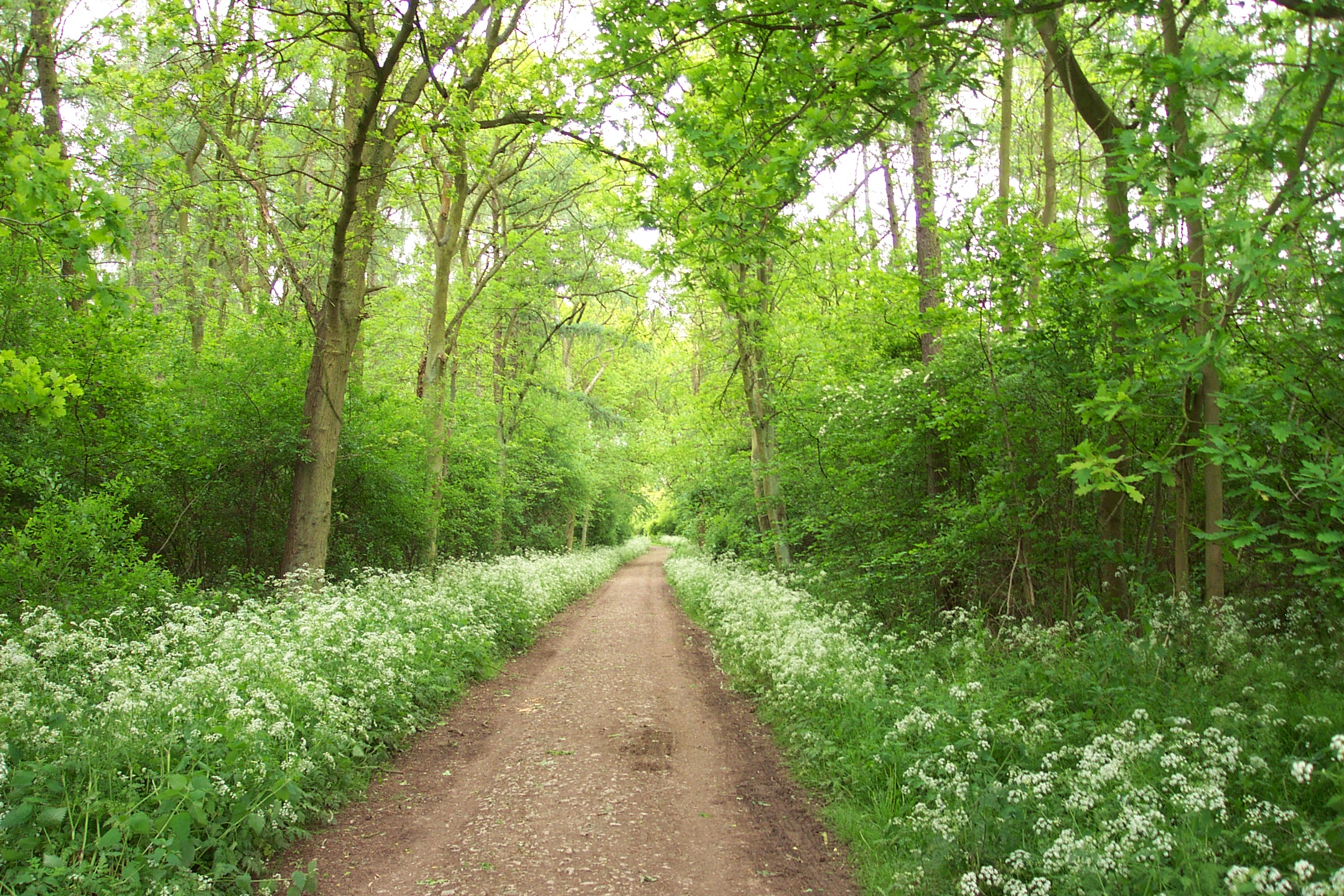
Path in Bourne Woods

Bourne Woods are situated near Bourne, Lincolnshire, England, and includes Bourne Wood and Fox Wood.

Bourne Wood (National Grid reference TF0821; Co-ordinates: O°24'W, 52°46'N) and Fox Wood are owned by The Forestry Commission and managed by Forest Enterprise (England) as part of Kesteven Forest.

There has been a tree coverage in this spot for at least 8000 years and Bourne Wood was mentioned in the Domesday Book in 1086. Whether this Bourne Wood is in the same location is up for debate.
