= Bruce Patterson =

Bruce Patterson may refer to:

- Bruce Patterson (cricketer) (born 1965), Scottish cricketer
- Bruce Patterson (politician) (born 1947), Republican member of the Michigan Senate
- Bruce Patterson (officer of arms) (born 1967), Canadian officer of arms at the Canadian Heraldic Authority
- Bruce D. Patterson (born 1952), American zoologist
