= Mike Patterson =

Mike Patterson may refer to:

- Mike Patterson (American football) (born 1983), American football defensive tackle
- Mike Patterson (baseball) (born 1958), former Major League Baseball outfielder
- Mike Patterson (footballer) (1941–2002), Australian rules footballer and coach
- Mike Patterson (transport director) (fl. 1970s–2010s), director of the Oklahoma Department of Transportation

== See also ==
- Mike Paterson (born 1942), computer scientist
- Michael Patterson (disambiguation)
