= Colin Patterson =

Colin Patterson may refer to:

- Colin Patterson (ice hockey) (born 1960), former ice hockey player in the National Hockey League
- Colin Patterson (rugby union) (born 1955), former Ireland international rugby union player
- Colin Patterson (biologist) (1933–1998), British palaeontologist
