= Richard Patterson =

Richard Patterson may refer to:

- Richard Cunningham Patterson Jr. (1886–1966), U.S. ambassador
- Richard Patterson (artist) (born 1963), English artist
- Richard H. Patterson (1931–2010), United States Coast Guard chief petty officer
- Richard North Patterson (born 1947), writer
- Richard Patterson, sailor on the whaleship Essex
- Richie Patterson (born 1983), New Zealand weightlifter
