= Thomas Patterson =

Thomas Patterson may refer to:

- Thomas Patterson (Pennsylvania politician) (1764–1841), United States congressman from Pennsylvania
- Thomas C. Patterson, American politician, member of the Arizona State Senate
- Thomas H. Patterson (1820–1889), U.S. naval officer during the American Civil War
- Thomas M. Patterson (1839–1916), United States representative and senator from Colorado
- Tom Patterson (theatre producer) (1920–2005), Canadian journalist and festival manager
- Tom Patterson (baseball) (1845–1900), Major League Baseball outfielder
- Thomas Patterson (cricketer) (1839–?), Australian cricketer
- Thomas Stewart Patterson (1872–1949), Scottish organic chemist
- Thomas E. Patterson, American political scientist
- Tom Patterson (basketball) (1948–1982), basketball forward
- Tom Patterson (entrepreneur) (born 1979), American entrepreneur
- Tom Patterson (Florida politician) (born 1943), American politician in the state of Florida
- Tom Patterson (Arrowverse), a character from The Flash

== See also ==
- Thomas Paterson (disambiguation)
