= Frances Taylor Patterson =

American writer

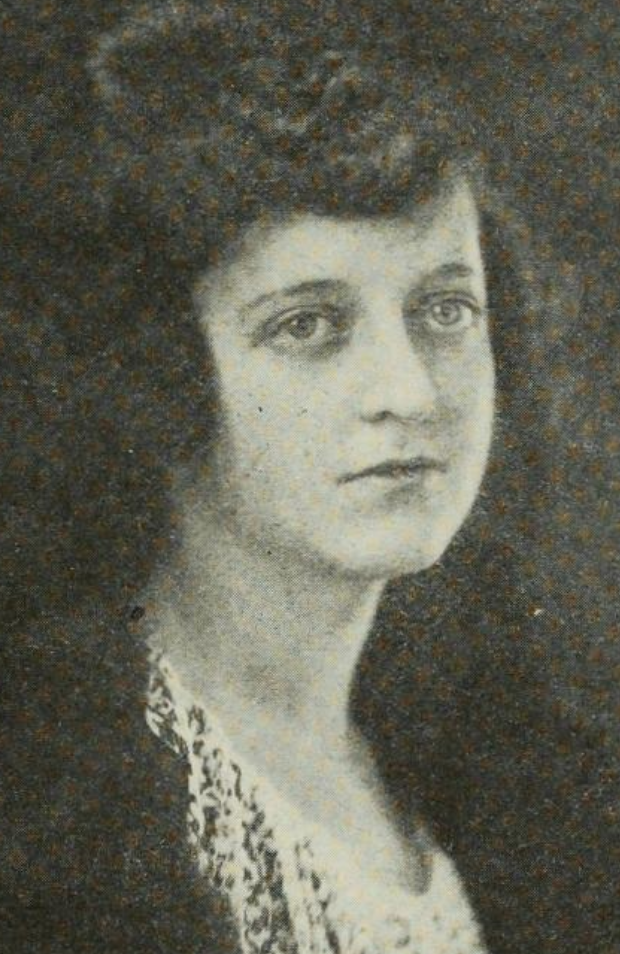
- Frances Taylor Patterson, from a 1920 publication
- Born: Frances Taylor; July 10, 1893; Dobbs Ferry, New York, U.S.
- Died: 1971 (aged 77–78)
- Occupations: Writer, lecturer

Frances Taylor Patterson (July 10, 1893 – 1971) was an American writer and lecturer. She taught an early screenwriting class at Columbia University, wrote two textbooks on screenwriting, and several other books. She published essays, fiction, criticism, and poetry in major national magazines, especially Commonweal.

== Early life and education ==
Frances Taylor was born in Dobbs Ferry, New York, one of the five children of James Leo Taylor and Rose Helena Dennen Taylor. Her father was a postmaster and newspaper editor. She graduated from Trinity College in Washington, D.C., in 1914.

== Career ==
In 1917, Patterson began teaching the Columbia University course titled "Photoplay Composition", when the original lecturer Victor Freeburg left for military service. She taught the course into the 1940s, for Columbia's Extension Program and as a home study course. She wrote two textbooks on the subject of screenwriting. She advocated for the value of original screenplays over adaptations from literary or theatrical texts, explaining that "the public will be enriched by seeing on the screen stories composed precisely for the camera, stories that take into consideration the mechanical aspect of talking pictures today."

Patterson wrote essays, fiction, poetry, and screenplays, but the only film produced from a Patterson screenplay was Broken Hearts (1926). "No matter what preconceived ideas you may have as to what Hollywood is like, when you get to that famous Mecca of the movies you are apt to find that it is quite otherwise," she wrote in 1931. "If you expect it to be fast, you will find that it is slow. If you expect fun, you will find plenty of hard work. The one constant among so many variables would seem to be the sun. You expect Hollywood to be sunny, and it is sunny."

Patterson was a member of the National Board of Review, and on the editorial staff of the board's magazine. She lectured at the Metropolitan Museum of Art, and in a radio address to the National Council of Catholic Women. She was a member of the Edward MacDowell Association, and the Friends of the Cardinal Hayes Library. In 1959, she addressed the Rosary Society at St. Brigid's Church in Westbury.

== Publications ==
=== Books ===
- Cinema Craftsmanship (1920)
- Scenario and Screen (1928)
- Motion Picture Continuities (1929, introduction and notes)
- White Wampum. The Story of Kateri Tekakwitha (1934, a biography)
- The Long Shadow (1957, a biography of John de Brébeuf, for young readers)

=== Poems, essays, and stories ===
- "Whom the Gods Destroy" and "Whiteface" (1917)
- "A New Art in an Old University" (1920, Photoplay)
- "Nanook of the North" (1922, The New Republic)
- "A Prize Paradox" (1925, The New York Times)
- "Metropolitan-Oats" (1926, Musical Courier)
- "Stall Talk" (1926, Musical Courier)
- "Ghostways" (1927, Scribner's Magazine)
- "The Sedulous Ape" (1927, The New Republic)
- "Music in the Movies" (1927, Commonweal)
- "On Being Young" (1928, Harper's Magazine)
- "Gesture" (1930, Scribner's Magazine)
- "Moth Dust" (1930, North American Review)
- "Will Hollywood Move to Broadway?" (1930, The New Republic)
- "The Hollywood Scene" (1931, The National Board of Review Magazine)
- "The End of Manhattan" (1933, Commonweal)
- "The Praying Castle" (1933, Commonweal)
- "Grace Before Thought" (1933, North American Review)
- "On Reading the Smart Magazines" (1933, The American Spectator)
- "Toward Morning" (1934, Commonweal)
- "The Ball and the Cross" (1934, The Catholic World)
- "Strange Slumbering" (1934, North American Review)
- "Song of the Rood" (1935, Commonweal)
- "I Have Waited" (1936, America: A Catholic Review of the Week)
- "A Guide to the Study of the Screen Version of Jules Verne's Michael Strogoff" (1937, Photoplay Studies)
- "End of Rural Manhattan" (1937, Commonweal)
- "Bridges" (1937, The Catholic World)
- "The Author and Hollywood" (1937, North American Review)
- "The Twenty-Fifth of March" (1938, The Catholic World)
- "Sketch in Charcoal" (1938, Commonweal)
- "Music is Yours" (1938, Commonweal)
- "Nourishment for Virtue" (1939, Commonweal)
- "Bread and Cinemas" (1939, North American Review)
- "Table for One" (1940, Harper's Magazine)
- "Cold Harvest" (1940, Commonweal)
- "Harbor View" (1941, The Yale Review)
- "Skyscraper Range" (1941, America: A Catholic Review of the Week)
- "Chanty for a Pilot of the Ocean-Air" (1944, Queen's Quarterly)
- "Mountain at Midnight" (1948, Queen's Quarterly)
- "Greenling" (1949, Queen's Quarterly)
- "Birds Above Niagara" (1950, Queen's Quarterly)
- "The Cloud of Witnesses" (1951, Queen's Quarterly)

== Personal life ==
Frances Taylor married educator Rowland A. Patterson in 1916. Her husband died in 1954. She lived in Brooklyn in her later years, and had a summer home in Mount Washington, Massachusetts. She died in 1971, in her late seventies. Her niece Maryrose Hanavan was the first woman to work as a traffic engineer in New York City.
