= Nick Patterson =

Nick Paterson may refer to:

- Nick Patterson (lacrosse) (born 1982), lacrosse goaltender
- Nick Patterson (scientist) (born 1947), mathematician and computational geneticist
