= Michael Patterson =

Michael Patterson may refer to:

- Michael Patterson (animator), American director and animator, creator of MC Skat Kat
- Michael Patterson (English footballer) (1905 – after 1931)
- Michael Patterson (Australian footballer) (1941–2002), AFL player
- Michael Patterson (producer), American record producer and mixer
- Michael Patterson (1956–2015), better known as Rex Ray, American visual artist, designer
- Michael Patterson, a character in For Better or For Worse

== See also ==
- Michael Paterson (disambiguation)
- Mike Patterson (disambiguation)
