= Soak dike =

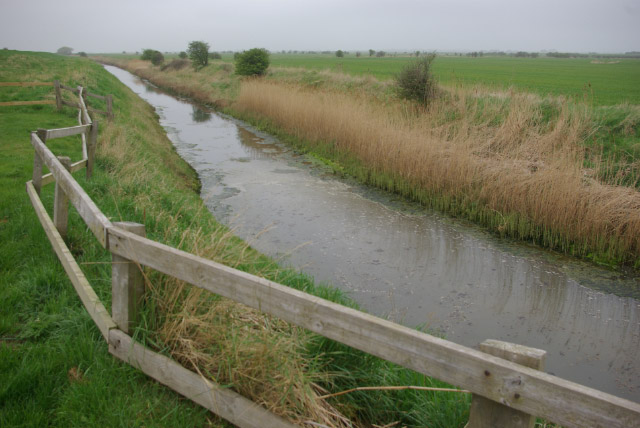
Soak Dike, Skeffling; the left bank protects the flat farmland between the Humber and Skeffling village

The term Soak dike is used in The Fens of eastern England to mean a ditch or drain running parallel with an embankment, for the purpose of taking any water that soaks through from the river or drain beyond the bank. In Lincolnshire, sock dyke was formerly a frequently found form of the expression.

In some parts of the world, the embankment would be called a levee.

The soak is the ground water in the peat or silt of the fenland, though the term is often used to mean water table.

In The Fens, water from the surrounding higher land is carried across the land which lies below high tide level, in embanked rivers. In this way, the need for pumping is reduced. However, the banks are never completely waterproof so that even in an otherwise thoroughly drained fen, the water table near the river bank would be high, reducing the value of the land and weakening the bank.

The leaky condition of the river embankments usually arose from a difficulty in finding good materials for their construction and from the piecemeal way in which the structures accumulated as the ground shrank or repairs were needed.

The difficulty is overcome by cutting a fairly small ditch, perhaps twenty or thirty metres from the bank, so that it collects the ground water and feeds it to a pump.

== Counter drain ==
Counter drain is another term for much the same thing though in this case, it may have been designed also to deal with water overflowing the river bank. The counter drain would therefore need to be bigger than the soak dike. Counter drain has tended to supersede the other term, particularly in its use as a proper name.

The Counter Drain in Deeping Fen is a good example, where the land between it and the bank of the River Glen was designed as a wash. In other words, the land between the river and the outer bank of the counter drain was originally intended to act as a reservoir in the event of an overflow from the river.
