= Paul Patterson (footballer) =

Australian rules footballer

Personal information
- Full name: Paul John Patterson
- Born: 28 September 1965 (age 61)
- Original team: West Adelaide (SANFL)
- Height: 189 cm (6 ft 2 in)
- Weight: 90 kg (14 st 2 lb; 198 lb)

Playing career^{1}
Years	Club	Games (Goals)
1984–99	West Adelaide (SANFL)	200 (?)
1991–93	Adelaide (AFL)	9 (2)
- ^{1} Playing statistics correct to the end of 1999.

Career highlights
- SANFL Player Life Member

Paul John Patterson (born 28 September 1965) is a former professional Australian rules footballer who played for the Adelaide Football Club in the Australian Football League (AFL), and for the West Adelaide Football Club in the South Australian National Football League (SANFL).

== Career ==
Patterson was already an experienced player for West Adelaide, having played in the SANFL since 1984, when he joined the newly formed Adelaide Crows for their first ever AFL league season in 1991. A key defender, he had to wait until round 22 to make his debut, against St Kilda at Football Park, and played just eight more games before being delisted in 1993.

Patterson, who had continued playing for West Adelaide while also a member of the Crows, remained at The Bloods until retiring in 1999, having brought up his 200th SANFL appearance in the final round of the season and in doing so earning himself player life membership with the SANFL.

== Personal ==
During his football career, Patterson was also a member of the Police Tactical Group, S.T.A.R. force with the South Australia Police. Patterson is currently an assistant coach of West Adelaide's league team.
