= Daniel Paterson =

Canadian politician

Daniel Paterson (c. 1739–1825) was a British Army officer and cartographer, known for his books of road maps.

== Life ==
Paterson was gazetted an ensign in the 30th (Cambridgeshire) Regiment of Foot on 13 December 1765, promoted to a lieutenant on 8 May 1772, and to a captaincy on 11 July 1783. He became a major in the army on 1 March 1794, and a lieutenant-colonel on 1 January 1798.

For many years Paterson was an assistant to the Quartermaster-General to the Forces, based at the Horse Guards, London. On 31 December 1812 he was made Lieutenant Governor of Quebec, a sinecure, and held the appointment for the rest of his life. He died at the residence of his friend, Colonel Dare, on Clewer Green, near Windsor, in April 1825, and was buried at Clewer on 21 April.

== Works ==
In 1771 Paterson published the first edition of his "Road Book". The work was dedicated to George Morrison, the Quartermaster-General to the Forces, and became well known in the British Army, for its official distances of military marches. The second edition was called Paterson's British Itinerary: being a new and accurate Delineation and Description of the Roads of Great Britain, 1776; the third edition reverted to the original title.

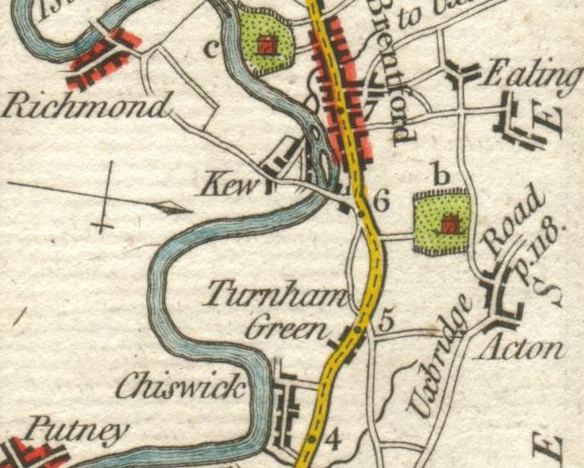
Detail from a Paterson road map of 1785. Main road west of London in the area of Kew Bridge.

Edward Mogg brought out a 16th edition of Paterson's "Roads" under the impression that the author was dead, in 1822. The 18th and last edition came out in 1829. Paterson also wrote:

- A Travelling Dictionary, or Alphabetical Tables of the Distances of all the Cities, Boroughs, Market Towns, and Seaports in Great Britain from each other, 1772, 2 vols.; 5th edit. 1787.
- Topographical Description of the Island of Grenada, 1780.
- A New and Accurate Description of all the Direct and Principal Cross Roads in Scotland, 5th edit. 1781.

== Notes ==
Attribution

This article incorporates text from a publication now in the public domain: Lee, Sidney, ed. (1895). "Paterson, Daniel". Dictionary of National Biography. Vol. 44. London: Smith, Elder & Co.
