= Jerry L. Patterson =

American writer

- Occupation: Writer
- Writing career
- Subject: gambling

Jerry L. Patterson is an American writer. He authored several gambling books as well as a gambling newspaper column.

== Bibliography ==
His first book, Blackjack: A Winner's Handbook, was published in 1977. Patterson wrote Casino Gambling: A Winner’s Guide to Blackjack, Craps, Roulette, Baccarat and Casino Poker in 1980. This book was revised in 2000 to reflect changing gaming rules, methods, and conditions.

He also wrote a gambling column in the late 1970s and 1980s, which was featured by several newspapers, including The New York Daily News, The San Francisco Chronicle, The Orange County Register, The Los Angeles Herald Examiner, and The Atlantic City Press

== Blackjack strategy ==
Besides his work as an author, Patterson has also conducted clinics in blackjack, and he collaborated with Will Cantey and Herb Maisel to build the first blackjack computer simulation model. This model was used to validate the card counting methods published by Ed Thorp and Julian Braun in Beat The Dealer. Patterson discussed this model on a panel with Ed Thorp, Julian Braun and other gambling notables at the 1964 Fall Joint Computer Conference.

In the late 1970s and early 1980s, Patterson developed and published a method for tracking favorable clumps of cards and cutting them into play and tracking unfavorable clumps of cards and cutting them out of play. This is known as "shuffle-tracking".

In 1982, a lawsuit initiated by Ken Uston prohibited the Atlantic City casinos from barring card counters but allowed the casinos to establish new blackjack rules making it much more difficult to attain an advantage in the multi-deck shoe game, except for players willing to play to the long-term. Since most of Patterson's clients and book readers are recreational, short-term players, he published a special report advising them of the potential impact of these new rules on their blackjack play.

Patterson also responded to these restrictive new blackjack rules by developing (with Eddie Olsen), a non-counting strategy called TARGET 21. This non-counting blackjack strategy caused the division of blackjack players into two groups which Patterson refers to as traditional players and new era players.

== Criticism ==
Patterson's later book editions contain assertions about the supposed effects of non-random shuffles and game biases. These ideas, as well as the TARGET system, are considered controversial and unsubstantiated by many blackjack experts.
