= Cussons =

Cussons is an English surname which may refer to:

== People ==
- Alexander Stockton Cussons (1914–1986), British soap manufacturer
- Alexander Tom Cussons (1875–1951), British soap manufacturer
- Eugene Cussons (1979–2026), South African primatologist
- Leslie Cussons (1907–1963), British soap manufacturer
- Sheila Cussons (1922–2004), South African poet
- Thomas Tomlinson Cussons (1838–1927), British chemist

== Other uses ==
- PZ Cussons, a British-based soap manufacturing company
  - PZ Cussons Ghana
  - PZ Cussons Nigeria Plc

== See also ==
- Cusson (disambiguation)
