= List of soap-makers =

This is a list of notable soap-makers. It lists notable soapmakers and soap ateliers.

- William Bell Allen (1812–1869), Irish-Australian soapmaker
- William Johnston Allen (1835–1915), Australian soap manufacturer, son of William Bell Allen
- Eberhard Anheuser (1806–1880), German-American soapmaker, father-in-law of Adolphus Busch
- Louis Honoré Arnavon (1786–1841), French soap manufacturer
- Samuel van den Bergh (1864–1941), Dutch soap manufacturer
- Emanuel Bronner (1908–1997), German-American soapmaker
- William Burford (1845–1925), Australian soapmaker, son of William Henville Burford
- William Henville Burford (1807–1895), Australian soapmaker, founder of W. H. Burford & Sons
- Samuel Colgate (1822–1897), American soapmaker, son of William Colgate
- William Colgate (1783–1857), British-American soapmaker, founder of Colgate
- Edward Rider Cook (1836–1898), English soapmaker
- Joseph Crompton (1840–1901), English-Australian soapmaker
- Arthur Crosfield (1865–1938), English soapmaker, son of Joseph Crosfield
- Joseph Crosfield (1792–1844), English soapmaker
- Alexander Stockton Cussons (1914–1986), English soap manufacturer, son of Alexander Tom Cussons
- Alexander Tom Cussons (1875–1951), English soapmaker, son of Thomas Tomlinson Cussons
- Leslie Cussons (1907–1963), English soap manufacturer, son of Alexander Tom Cussons
- Thomas Tomlinson Cussons (1838–1927), English soapmaker, founder and chairman of the soap manufacturing company Cussons & Son
- John Mills McCallum (1847–1920), Scottish soap manufacturer
- Arthur McKenzie Dodson (1819–1874), American soapmaker
- N. K. Fairbank (1829–1903), American soap manufacturer
- Joseph Fels (1853–1914), American soap manufacturer, developer of Fels-Naptha
- Peter Fenger (1719–1774), Danish soap manufacturer
- Else Fenger, Danish soap manufacturer
- Josiah Franklin (1657–1745), English-American soapmaker, father of Benjamin Franklin
- James Gamble (1803–1891), Irish-American soapmaker, co-founder of Procter & Gamble
- William Gossage (1799–1877), English soap manufacturer
- Alfred John Hampson (1864–1924), Australian soap manufacturer
- John Nelson Hinkle (1854–1905), American soapmaker
- Jacob Holm, Danish soap-maker
- Robert Spear Hudson (1812–1884), English soap manufacturer
- Robert William Hudson (1856–1937), English soap manufacturer, son of Robert Spear Hudson
- Antonius Johannes Jurgens (1867–1945), Dutch-English soap manufacturer
- Derreck Kayongo (born 1970), Ugandan American soapmaker
- William Hesketh Lever (1851–1925), English soapmaker, co-founder of Lever Brothers
- Andrew Pears (c. 1770–1845), English soapmaker, founder of Pears Soap
- Charles Upfold (1834–1919), English-Australian soapmaker
- Joseph Watson (1873–1922), English soap manufacturer
