= Zochonis =

Zochonis is a Greek surname. Notable people with the surname include:

- Constantine Zochonis (1894–1951), British industrialist, chairman of PZ Cussons
- George Zochonis (1852–1929), Greek businessman, founder of PZ Cussons
- John Zochonis (1929–2013), British industrialist, chairman of PZ Cussons
