= Alexander Cussons =

Alexander Cussons may refer to:

- Alexander Tom Cussons (1875–1951), chairman of Cussons Sons & Co
- Alexander Stockton Cussons (1914–1986), chairman of Cussons Group
