= George Patterson =

George Patterson may refer to:

- George Patterson (advertiser) (1890–1968), Australian advertising pioneer
  - George Patterson Y&R, an Australasian advertising agency
- George Patterson (baseball), outfielder during the 1884 Philadelphia Keystones season
- George Patterson (basketball) (1939–2003), basketball player
- George Patterson (cricketer) (1868–1943), Philadelphian cricketer
- George Patterson (football manager) (1887–1955), English football manager
- George Patterson (footballer, born 1934) (1934–2021), English professional footballer
- George Patterson (Scottish footballer) (1909–?), Scottish footballer
- George Patterson (ice hockey) (1906–1977), ice hockey player
- George Patterson (missionary) (1920–2012), Scottish missionary doctor
- Ben Patterson (politician) (George Benjamin Patterson, born 1939), Member of European Parliament
- George Robert Patterson (1863–1906), United States Representative from Pennsylvania
- George Sutton Patterson (1887–1953), Canadian representative on UNTCOK
- George W. Patterson (1799–1879), United States Representative from New York
- George W. Patterson (Oregon politician) (1857–1932), state senator from Oregon
- George Patterson (died 1984), founder of Georgian Wicca

== See also ==
- George Paterson (disambiguation)
