= George Paterson =

George Paterson may refer to:

- George Paterson (businessman) (1845–1939), founder of United Kingdom' soap manufacturers PZ Cussons
- George Paterson (footballer, born 1904) (1900–1949), Scottish footballer for Stoke City
- George Paterson (footballer, born 1914) (1914–1985), Scottish international footballer for Celtic
- George Paterson (footballer, born 1916) (1916–1996), Scottish football defender for Liverpool
- George Paterson (rower) (1940–2020), former New Zealand rower
- George C. Paterson (1891–1945), American football player and engineer
- George Paterson (rugby union), Scottish rugby union player

== See also ==
- George Patterson (disambiguation)
