= Gerard Bros. =

Personal healthcare brand

Gerard Bros. Ltd.
- Company type: Limited company
- Industry: Soaps
- Founded: 1876
- Headquarters: Nottingham, England
- Products: Ino toilet soap, Ino flakes

Edwardian brochure for Gerard Bros. Ltd.

Gerard Bros. Ltd. was a manufacturer of personal healthcare products. The business was founded in 1876 and incorporated in 1897, and Thomas Bruges Gerard was voted its first chairman. The company established a factory in Wilkinson Street, New Basford, Nottingham. The factory was built on a 14-acre (57,000 m^{2}) site and pumped water from the River Leen. In 1921 the factory was severely damaged by fire, but the subsequent rebuild afforded the opportunity to expand the factory.

In 1955 the company was acquired by Cussons Sons & Co., chaired by Leslie Cussons makers of the famous brand Cussons Imperial Leather soap. After the acquisition Cussons kept the Gerard Bros. factory in use.

In 1975 Cussons Sons & Co. were themselves acquired by Paterson Zochonis (recently renamed to PZ Cussons). In 2005 PZ Cussons finally closed the old Gerard Bros. factory, and manufacturing was moved to Pathumthani, Thailand.

== Brands ==
Gerard Bros.'s main brand was called 'Ino'. The brand was produced as a toilet soap with the tagline "The First Aid to Beauty". Washing flakes were also produced with the tagline 'Ino Flakes Wash Everything'. A set of playing cards were manufactured to advertise Ino Flakes.

Gerard Bros. also manufactured a range of soaps inspired by flowers. The range included Lily of the Valley, Rose and Lavender.

== Soap factory in the Edwardian era ==
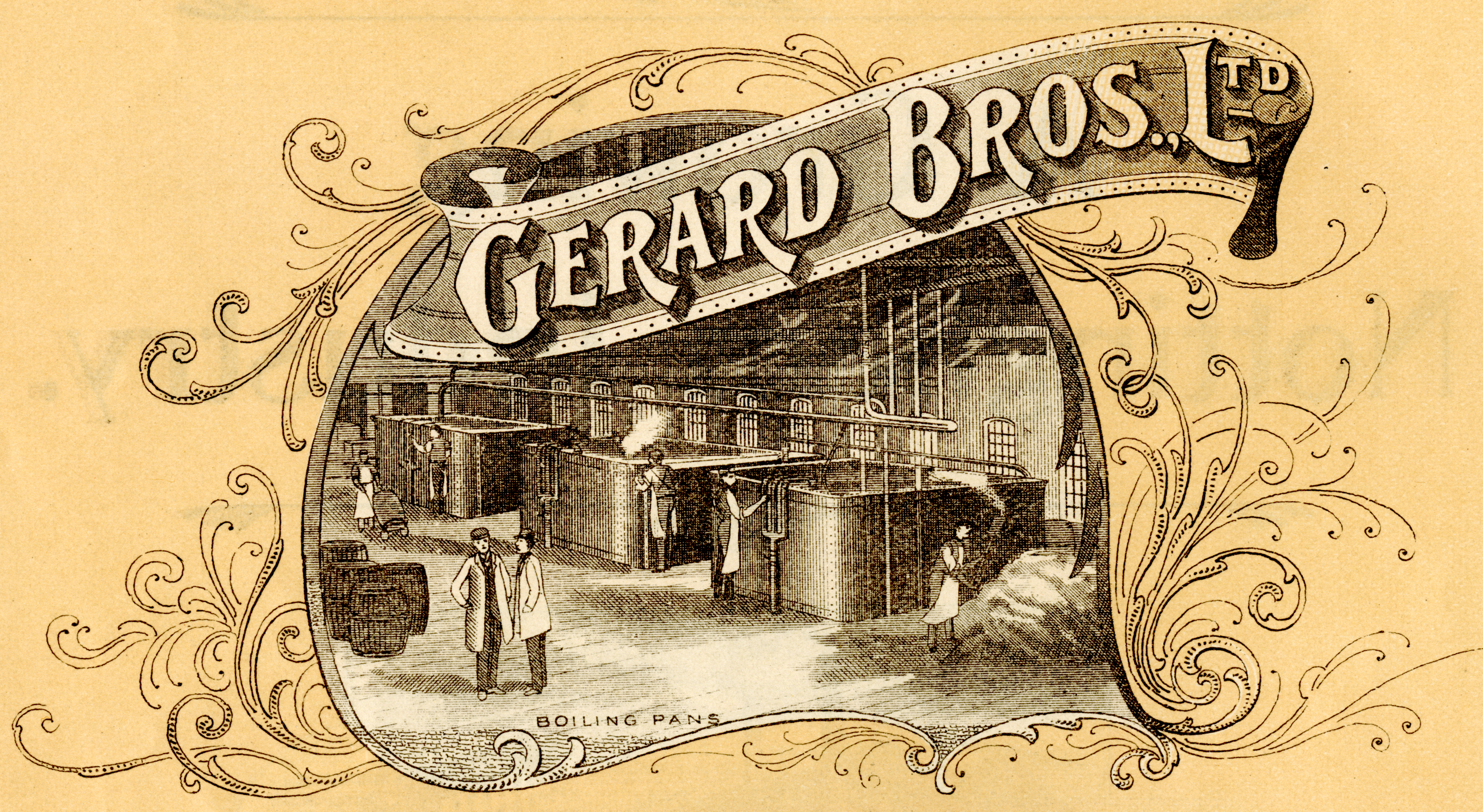
Engraving of the boiling pans at the Gerard Bros. Ltd. soap factory.

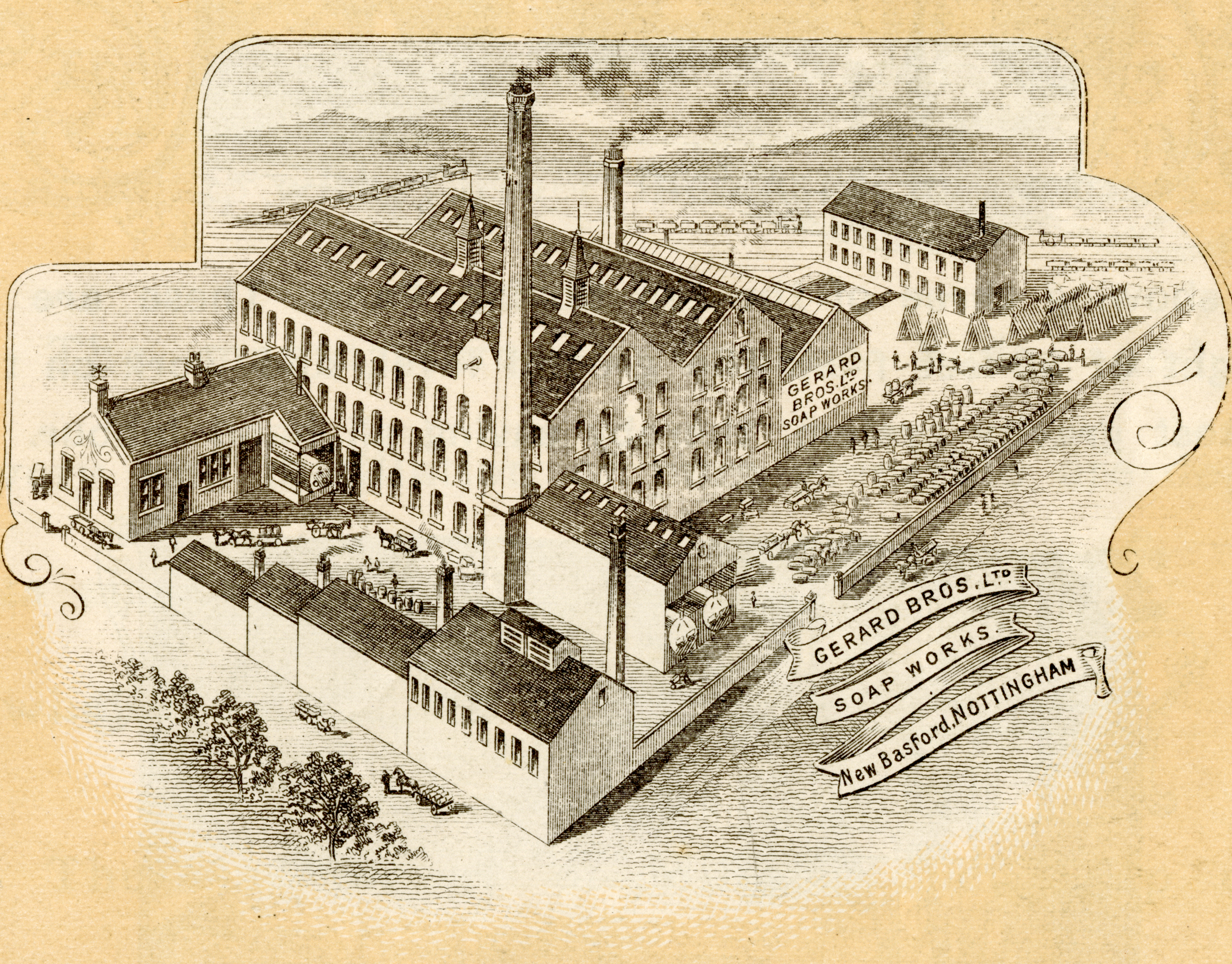
Engraving of the Gerard Bros. Ltd. soap factory.

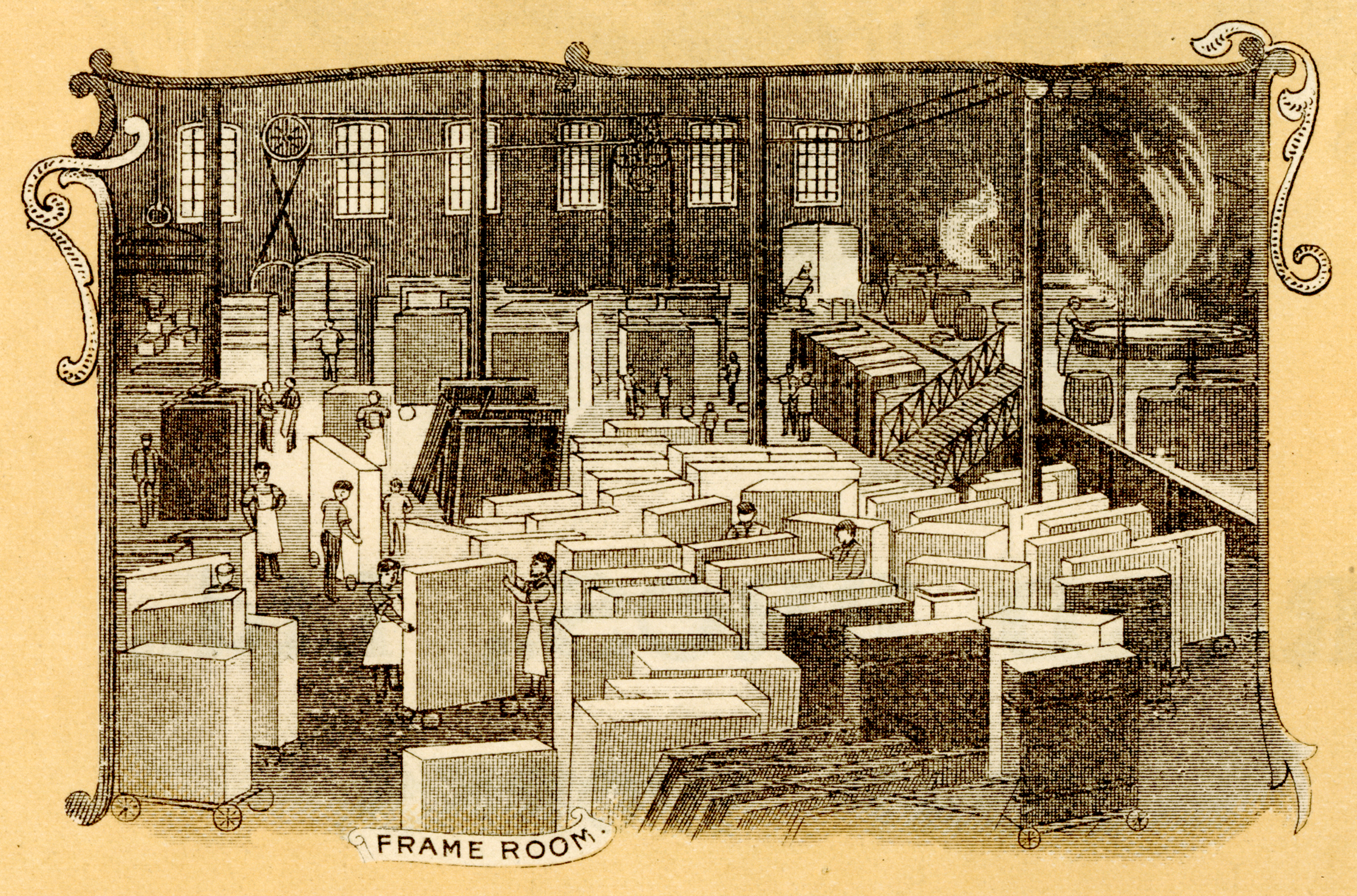
Engraving of the frame room used for cooling soap in steel frames.

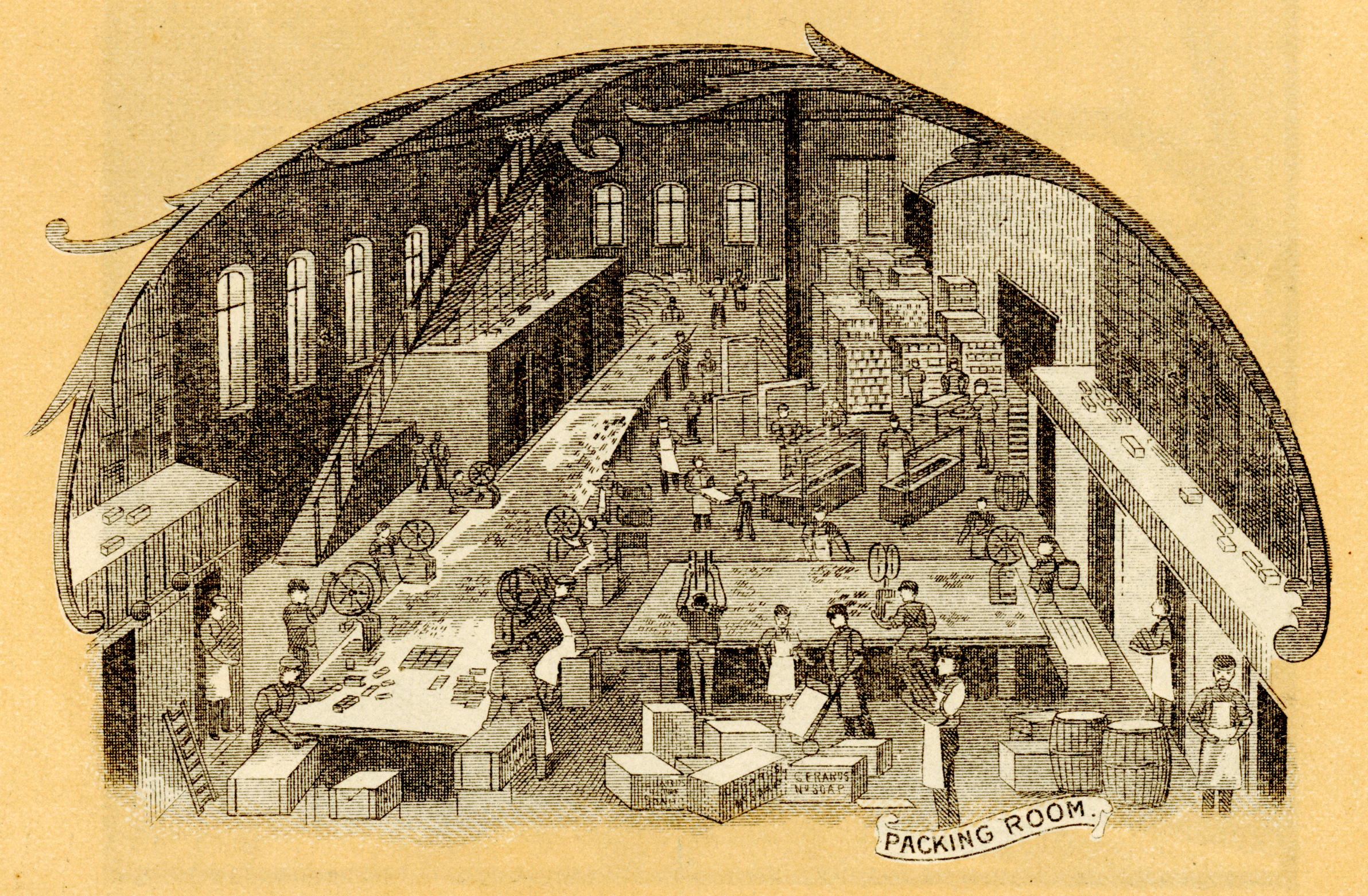
Engraving of the household soap packing room.
