= George William Septimus Piesse =

English chemist and perfumer

- Born: 30 May 1820
- Died: 23 October 1882 (aged 62); Grove Park, Chiswick, London, England, UK
- Other name: Septimus Piesse
- Education: University College London
- Occupation: Perfumer
- Notable work: The Art of Perfumery
- Spouses: Emma Chaplin (m. 1846; died 1871) Louisa Sadler (m. 1874)

George William Septimus Piesse (30 May 1820 – 23 October 1882), known as Septimus Piesse, was an English chemist and perfumer. Piesse was a leading author and innovator of modern perfume ideas, inventing the concept of notes in perfumery that are still used universally today. He was the co-owner of Piesse and Lubin, a perfume house that created some of the most popular scents of its day.

== Education ==
Piesse studied at University College London.

== The Art of Perfumery, and Method of Obtaining Odors from Plants ==
Piesse's The Art of Perfumery is an important early book about the methodology behind extraction methods and blending in perfumery. It is considered Piesse's "opus magnum". In the book, Piesse introduces the idea that olfaction can be described in ways that correlate to the musical notes on a diatonic scale. He is credited with creating an "odaphone," or a scale related to categorizing and ranking the notes by octave.

The Art of Perfumery is also notable in that, in an 1862 edition, Piesse introduced ideas relating to synesthesia and smound. He suggested that sounds and scents are linked in the brain: "Scents, like sounds, appear to influence the olfactory nerve in certain definite degrees."

One of The Art of Perfumery's most enduring legacies is Piesse's popularization of the use of synthetic materials.

== Mercutio Frangipani ==
According to an article titled "Making the Synthetic Epic" in the journal, The Senses and Society, Andrew Kettler recounted the story of how Piesse, in later editions of The Art of Perfumery, invented the character named Mercutio Frangipani. According to Piesse, Frangipani was a botanist who was on board one of Christopher Columbus' voyages to America, and even supposedly found land by smelling it. There was a 17th-century French botanist named Charles Plumier, who did travel to study the plants in American, and who Frangipani may be based on. The invention of Frangipani was meant to correlate Piesse's perfume practice, particularly a scent called "Frangipanni," to the "exotic encounters in the Atlantic World." However, the story of Frangipani has since been reprinted in several books on perfume history as fact.

== Piesse and Lubin ==
Piesse and Wilhelm Lubin, "an elite Paris manufacturer of perfumes," co-founded Piesse and Lubin in 1855. In "Making the Synthetic Epic," Kettler wrote, "Piesse...became the premier perfumer on the London scent scene in the 1860s after the publishing of numerous works on the use of flowers for creating perfumes." Piesse and Lubin's laboratory existed at Number 2, New Bond Street in London. Piesse and Lubin created a number of popular perfumes in the late 19th century, including Hungary Water (1873), Kiss Me Quick (1873), Frangipanni (1880), and Vashti (1900).

=== Mary Celestia ===
In 2011, anthropologist Philippe Rouja found several bottles of Piesse and Lubin's Bouquet Opoponax in the sand near the shipwreck of the Mary Celestia, a Civil War-era boat that crashed into a reef off of Bermuda in 1864. Rouja brought the bottles to Bermuda Perfumery, a local perfume house established in 1928. The owner, Isabelle Ramsay-Brackstone, had the perfumes analyzed by Osmothèque, a scent archive in Versailles. Based on the analysis, Bermuda Perfumery was able to re-create a version of Bouquet Opoponax
