= PZ Cussons Nigeria Plc =

Nigerian manufacturer and distributor of consumer products

PZ Cussons Nigeria plc
- Type: Public company
- Industry: Cosmetics, Soaps, Personal care, Dairy, Household chemicals, & Natural Oils
- Founder: George Paterson, George Zochonis
- Headquarters: Lagos, Nigeria
- Key people: Chris Giannopoulos, MD
- Products: Imperial Leather, Soaps, Milk, Powdered Milk, olive oil, Detergents & Healthcare Products.
- Revenue: Naira 79,630m (2017)
- Operating income: Naira 13,215m(2017)

PZ Cussons Nigeria Plc is a publicly listed Nigerian manufacturer and distributor of consumer products such as detergents, toiletries, soaps and home appliances. It is a subsidiary of the British company PZ Cussons Holdings, which owns controlling shares in the firm.

PZ trades home appliances products under the brand Haier Thermocool and manages Coolworld electrical stores. It has a joint venture with Wilmar International to produce and trade vegetable oil and palm oil.

== History ==
The company's operations can be traced to the Sierra Leone–based commodities and textile dealing partnership of George Paterson and George Zochonis. The partners who were of Scottish and Greek heritage established a West African trading post in Sierra Leone in 1879 which was later incorporated in Great Britain in February 1884 as Patterson Zochonis. In 1899, the partners opened a trading post in Nigeria and soon developed a merchandising network within the country. In the 1950s, the firm began producing soaps in Nigeria from a factory in Aba, incorporating it under a subsidiary called Alagbon Industries. In 1957, the group transferred assets not affiliated with its soap business to a newly incorporated company in Nigeria called Patterson Zochonis Nigeria Limited. Alagbon industries was later known as Associated Industries and then changed to Paterson Zochonis Industries Limited. It became publicly listed on the Nigerian Stock Exchange in 1972, selling 40% of its shares to the Nigerian public, additional 20% was sold in 1977.

To increase revenues, it expanded its product line to include Thermocool appliances. Within the group's structure, PZ industrial division concentrated on toiletries, soaps and detergents manufacturing while Thermocool focused on refrigerators.

PZ expanded its manufacturing business and commenced production of Elephant and Jet detergents in 1970s to challenge Omo produced by Lever Brothers. In 1973, Thermocool refrigerators were assembled in Nigeria and the company invested in pharmaceutical manufacturing. The firm reduced its trading activities during the 1970s to focus on manufacturing.

In 2003, the firm launched a joint venture with Glanbia group to produce evaporated milk and milk powder. This business was sold in 2019.

== Brands ==
The firm has interest in beauty and personal care, baby products, bath products, oral care, health care, fragrances and skin care.

- Ava
- Canoe
- Elephant
- Florish
- Joy
- Morning Fresh
- Nunu
- Premier
- Robb
- Stella
- Sweet 16
- Haier Thermocool
- Venus
- Venus de Milo
