= Constantine Zochonis =

British manufacturer and international merchant

- Born: Constantine Polychronis Zochonis; 26 July 1894; Sale, Cheshire, England
- Died: 17 May 1951, aged 56; Bucklow, Cheshire, England
- Occupation: industrialist
- Title: chairman of PZ Cussons
- Predecessor: George Basil Zochonis
- Successor: Alexander Loupos
- Children: Sir John Zochonis
- Relatives: George Zochonis (uncle)

Constantine Polychronis Zochonis (26 July 1894 – 17 May 1951) was a British manufacturer and international merchant. From 1929 to 1951 he was chief executive and primary shareholder of Paterson Zochonis (PZ), a company which then had a head office in Cheshire but was operating mainly in Africa. Under C.P. Zochonis' management, PZ expanded from Sierra Leone into the Gold Coast, invested in its host countries by opening factories and shops there, took over a Nigerian soap manufacturer. By the end of his career, he had expanded the company into three more African countries. Although the company provided employment in Africa, and profit for British trade, PZ's host countries were affected by the company's colonial attitudes under C.P. Zochonis' chairmanship. The company became PZ Cussons in 2002.

== Family ==
C.P. Zochonis was an active part of a dynastic and entrepreneurial business family. His father was Polychronis Basil Zochonis (Greece c. 1856 – Bowdon 26 February 1933) (Note: Polychronis Basil Zochronis (Greece c. 1856 – Bucklow 26 February 1933) Deaths Mar 1933 Zochonis Polychronis B. 76 Bucklow 8a 335) a buyer for an African merchant. His mother was Eleni or Elene Polychronis Zochonis (Greece c. 1870 – Altrincham 11 February 1943), (Note: Eleni Polychronis Zochonis (Greece c. 1870 – Bucklow 11 February 1943) Deaths Mar 1943 Zochonis Eleni 72 Bucklow 8a 289) and his sister was Alexandra P. Zochonis. (Note: Alexandra P. Zochonis (b. Bowdon 1900) Births Sep 1900 Zochonis Alexandra Bucklow 8a 180) Constantine (known as "Costi") was born on 26 July 1894 in Sale, Cheshire. (Note: England Census 1901, RG13/3321, p.11, schedule 144, "Newcroft", Hale Road, Altrincham, Cheshire. Births Sep 1894 Zochonis Constantine Altrincham 8a 180) He was the nephew of the founder of Paterson Zochonis (now PZ Cussons), George Zochonis, from whom he inherited control of the family business.

In 1908, when C.P. Zochonis was around 14 years old, he passed the entrance examination to the University of Oxford. The family holidayed together. The months of January and December 1914 find his father P.B. Zochonis, his mother E.P. Zochonis, his uncle G.B. Zochonis, his aunt, his sister Alexandra and C.P. Zochonis together at Colwyn Bay Hotel, Wales.

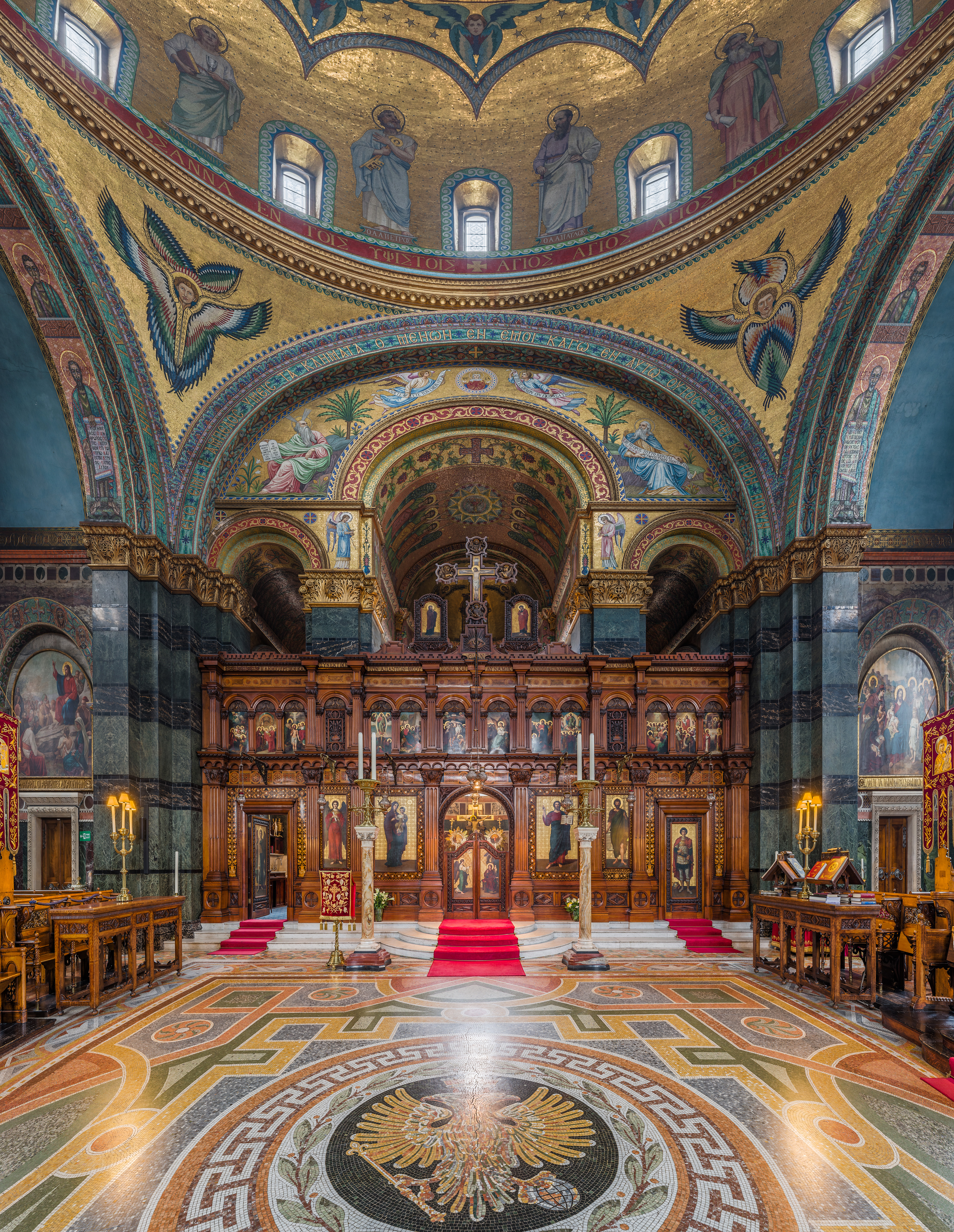
St Sophia Cathedral, London, where Zochonis was married

In 1921, C.P. Zochonis celebrated his engagement. At Saint Sophia Cathedral, London on 22 April 1922, he married Octavia Nitza (known as "Nitza"), née Stavridi (Kensington 22 October 1895 – Sumner 3 June 1981); her father was solicitor Sir John Stavridi (1867–1948), the Greek consul-general in London. (Note: Marriages Jun 1922 Zochonis Constantine P. and Stavridi Octavia N. Chelsea 1a 934) Among the wedding guests were the Serbian ambassador Mihailo Gavrilović and the Colombian minister. The other guests included Sir Gordon Nairne, Lady Mary Oppenheimer, wife of Ernest Oppenheimer, Lady Nevarte Gulbenkian, wife of Calouste Gulbenkian, Emile Mond, T. P. O'Connor, Pandeli Ralli, Harold Spender and George Eumorfopoulos. The couple honeymooned in Italy. Their son was Sir John Zochonis (2 October 1929 – 30 November 2013), who later inherited control of the company, in the form of chairmanship.

Zochonis' last address was "Westfield", St Margarets Road, Bowdon, Cheshire. He died on 17 May 1951, (Note: Deaths Jun 1951 Zochonis Constantine P. 56 Bucklow 10a 117) in Bucklow Rural District, Cheshire, England, and left £253,115 9s 11d (equivalent to £6,913,938 in 2025). He was buried on 22 May 1951 in Greater Manchester. (Note: C.P. Zochonis was possibly buried in Altrincham Cemetery, Greater Manchester, where other members of his family were already buried.)

== Career ==
=== Paterson Zochonis (PZ) ===
==== Business context of C.P. Zochonis ====
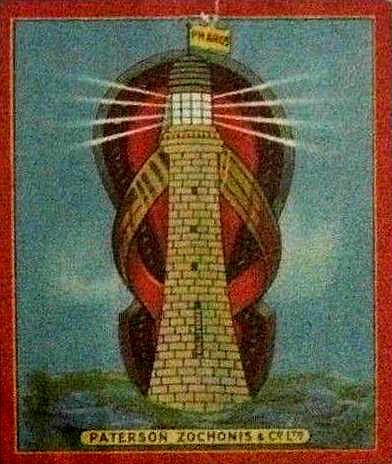
Paterson Zochonis crate label, c. 1940

Zochonis was involved in the family shipping merchant business Paterson Zochonis & Co., known as PZ (now PZ Cussons). The company was started in 1879 in Sierra Leone by a pair of trading company workers, Zochonis' uncle George Basil Zochonis (1852–1929) from Greece, and George Henry Paterson (c. 1845–1939) from Manchester. They set up a trading post, after working for Fisher & Randall of Freetown. The Dictionary of National Biography describes what happened next:

Incorporated in 1884, PZ grew from a trading merchant into a merchant-supported network of retail and wholesale stores across West Africa. Paterson had no issue and the firm passed to Constantine Polychronis Zochonis, nephew of the founder, in 1932. After 1945 African aspirations for self-sufficiency and industrial progress demanded changes from the half dozen or so European firms in the West African trading system. Constantine Zochonis, as chairman and managing director, chose to invest in African manufacturing. In 1948 PZ purchased a small soap factory at Aba in Nigeria.

Between 1923 and 1924, while C.P. Zochonis was a manager of PZ and before he was chairman, the company had to deal with an expensive court case in which shipping companies Elder Dempster, British and African Steam Navigation, and Griffiths Lewis Steam Navigation had allowed "damage to a part cargo of palm oil in casks carried from two West African ports to Kingston upon Hull on the steamship Grelwen". PZ sued them for "negligence in the stowage by stowing palm kernels above the casks of oil and by not erecting a temporary 'tween deck to protect the oil from the weight of the palm kernels and that by reason of this and the depths of her holds the vessel was unseaworthy for the carriage of the oil". PZ won the case, but it went to appeal in the House of Lords.

==== Contribution of C.P. Zochonis ====
Constantine Zochonis became chief executive and primary shareholder in 1929 when George Zochonis died. Because PZ required hands-on management, that made him directly responsible for all the company's affairs until his own death in 1951. He expanded the company into the Gold Coast, opening an office in Tema in 1934. Under C.P. Zochonis' direction, Paterson Zochonis "remained a British registered company managed by Greeks doing almost all of its business in Africa". By the end of his career, the company was "investing heavily in sub-Saharan Africa", it had bought the Nigerian soap-manufacturing firm Bayley's (incorporated in 1948 as a subsidiary, Alagbon Industries Ltd. of Aba).

Under C.P. Zochonis, PZ had its own shops in Africa, and Zochonis was beginning expansion plans into French Guinea, Liberia and Cameroon. C.P. Zochonis was pioneering new trading places; for example five years after his death, PZ was still the only British company operating in Liberia, where the trade was in US dollars. C.P. Zochonis survived in business, working alongside local traders. In Onitsha, Nigeria, Madam Onu Okwei had made her fortune by British-Igbo currency exchange, and in the 1930s Zochonis leased one of her 24 houses.

During C.P. Zochonis' management era, PZ was one of the group of Greek merchants which "dominated the Cameroonian trading space" directly after World War II. They were involved with local growers, and also sold imports in the area. In Yorubaland, Nigeria, during C.P. Zochonis' era of management, the local population increased due to expansion of the company and to local employment in palm and cocoa production in the hinterland of Osogbo; this was aided by the import of wheeled transport. "In 1948, when ... Constantine was at the helm – Paterson Zochonis acquired its first soap factory in Aba, Nigeria. "This proved to be a landmark in the company's history, as soap was to become a major part of its trade". As the original trading business declined, a new portfolio of toiletry and pharmaceutical interests flourished. The business continued to expand and diversify".

The Zochonis family remained in "key positions" in the firm throughout its history. Zochonis was also a member-shareholder in Martins Bank. During C.P. Zochonis' management era, PZ was one of the most successful companies in Sierra Leone, and in Nigeria where the firm had "branches in practically every inland river port". By 1949, C.P. Zochonis was running one of the largest multinational operations in Nigeria, those companies together accounting for "some 49% of all traded commodities in Nigeria". Not everything went well, though. During World War II the company was under pressure to supply rubber to the UK, but there were difficulties in supply, price and logistics—and there were rumours of corruption—so PZ received one shipment of rubber and then gave up that line of business.

==== Consequences for PZ of the C.P. Zochonis era ====
Constantine Zochonis died suddenly in 1951. He was the primary shareholder in the business, so his family was hit with death duties, and that is why the company went public in 1953—for the protection of the family, and to pay death taxes on C.P. Zochonis' company shares. Zochonis' cousin Alexander Loupos took charge until Zonchonis' son John became chairman in the 1970s. Zochonis' unexpected death, his son's promotion and political factors facilitated an increase in business. "Between 1974 and 1993 PZ's turnover rose from £75 million to £233 million, attaining over £450 million in the profitable 1970s and 1980s. Employee numbers varied between around 4000 and 5000 during [John] Zochonis's chairmanship". PZ purchased Cussons in 1975, and was renamed PZ Cussons plc in 2002. So, C.P. Zochonis functioned in the early days of what is now a market leader.

== Consequences for Africa of the C.P. Zochonis era ==
=== Colonial attitude of PZ as inherited by C.P. Zochonis ===
Although Paterson Zochonis profited, colonial attitudes caused problems in Africa where the company was flourishing. By the time C.P. Zochonis took charge, influenza and smallpox epidemics had followed the Europeans to Sierra Leone. This interrupted the trade, farm work and travel of local people, while colonial companies like PZ were still expecting people to work, produce food, and support the company shops. During C.P. Zochonis' childhood in Africa there were local riots, for example in the Sherbro people's district of Sierra Leone, where five local agents of PZ were killed, and the sub-factories at Bendu were burned. In 1919 when C.P. Zochonis was one of PZ's managers, the UK government offered a war bonus to African colonial employees to purchase rice, and companies such as PZ were supposed to sell it to them in Freetown at a controlled price. However PZ, among other European companies, was diverting rice to uncontrolled areas "up country" in Sierra Leone where more than double the price could be had. There were more riots, and some local people were dying of starvation. This was the company that C.P. Zochonis inherited as chairman and major shareholder in 1929.

=== Colonial attitude of PZ under C.P. Zochonis ===
In Africa in 1929, C.P. Zochonis inherited from his uncle a situation of fierce competition and rivalry between European and Lebanese merchants. Those merchants, headed by PZ and apparently with humanitarian intentions, had already banded together with local Africans to eject the projected plantation economy of the oil company Lever Brothers from Yonnibanna in Sierra Leone, and that had benefited Temne farmers who were already able to earn more by producing oil themselves, than by working for Lever. However, under pressure of the Great Depression, other rivalries between colonialists during the C.P. Zochonis era caused some African peoples to be alternately beneficiaries and casualties of that business competition which was now driven primarily for profit. Under C.P. Zochonis in the 1930s, PZ affected Ghana socially by continuing colonial attitudes in the north, using (and sometimes forcing) uneducated labour for production of goods, and promoting the advancement of southern Ghanaians by working with them as farmers, brokers and retailers in its commercial retail houses in the south. Thus a perception grew, of uneducated, proletarian northern locals who were disadvantaged by an emerging class of bourgeois traders in the south.

Through PZ, up to the 1940s, C.P. Zochonis continued the colonisation process initiated in around 1893 in Yorubaland, to control that area as the British Empire and sell European imports via local entrepreneurs through its company's wholesale merchant houses. However, in places like Ibadan, Nigeria, large market places grew up in association with European-initiated railways and the trading posts of large companies including PZ. Such market places benefited the populace, but also brought in petty criminals such as the Jaguda boys, whose behaviour could not be controlled by the locals.

Under the chairmanship of C.P. Zochonis on 16 November 1946, Paterson Zochonis co-founded Nigeria Brewery with a group of firms intending to brew and sell Star lager beer in Africa. The group was served by a brewery set up by Heineken in Iganmu, Nigeria. Their first brew was completed on 14 July 1949, although it was not the first western-style beer to enter Africa. Bishop Herbert Tugwell had already criticised beer imports to Africa as "a destructive force", saying "it is a very easy and cheap way of raising revenue". Under the management of C.P. Zochonis in the 1930s and 1940s, PZ was involved in the colonial hides and skin trade, through its office in Kano, Nigeria, and under the umbrella of the Hides and Skins Sub-Committee of the Kano Chamber of Commerce. The colonial trading system kept the pastoral workers and the middle men continually in debt, preventing them from exporting the hides themselves.

== Other activities ==
In 1932 C.P. Zochonis joined the Archbishop of Canterbury and other VIPs in a public appeal for help on behalf of those in need following the Macedonian earthquake of 26 September, in that year. Through PZ, he also supported the British appeal on behalf of victims of the Gold Coast earthquake of 22 June 1939, to the tune of £150 (equivalent to £8,477 in 2025). He belonged to the Nigerian and Gold Coast Dinner Clubs, which met at the Savoy Hotel, London. This was a gathering of aristocratic, military and other British people associated with governance and trading in West Africa. In 1943, on behalf of victims of World War II, C.P. Zochonis was a founder member of the Committee for the Adoption of Greek Towns and Villages Destroyed by the Common Enemy, under the auspices of the Greek Red Cross in Foreign Countries.

== Memorials ==
C.P. Zochonis is memorialised in the naming of the C.P. Zochonis Research Fellowship. This is a charitable bursary for young students of gastric medicine, offered by the British Digestive Foundation via the University of Manchester, Manchester being the home town of C.P. Zochonis. It is open to "younger research workers", and provides for "gastro-enterological research into the prevention and treatment of alimentary and liver disorders". The bursary was used, for example, to support the research of Robert W. Nicholson in his doctoral thesis, The Hida Scan in Hepatobiliary Disease (1980).
