= John Zochonis =

British industrialist

Sir John Zochonis
- Born: John Basil Zochonis; 2 October 1929
- Died: 30 November 2013 (aged 84)
- Education: Corpus Christi College, Oxford
- Occupation: industrialist
- Title: chairman of PZ Cussons
- Spouse: Brigid Demetriades (née Smyth)
- Parent: Constantine Zochonis
- Relatives: George Zochonis (great uncle)

Sir John Basil Zochonis DL (2 October 1929 – 30 November 2013) was a British industrialist and philanthropist, the chairman of PZ Cussons, and the great nephew of its founder, George Zochonis.

== Early life ==
John Zochonis was born in Cheshire. He attended Rugby School and studied at Corpus Christi College, Oxford.

== Career ==
He joined PZ Cussons in 1953.

== Philanthropy ==
He was well known for his charity, and has been called "possibly the largest giver in the North West". He gave to, inter alia, Chethams School of Music, the Clonter Opera, the Buxton Festival, the Manchester International Festival, Manchester Art Gallery, the Lowry Centre, Manchester Midday Concerts Society, Royal Exchange Theatre and the Northern Chamber Orchestra.

== Personal life ==
In 1990, he married Brigid Demetriades (née Smyth). Lady Zochonis died on 12 February 2026, aged 87.

Honorary titles
Preceded by	High Sheriff of Greater Manchester; 1994–5	Succeeded by Edmund Gartside
