= Piesse & Lubin =

Luxury perfumery in London

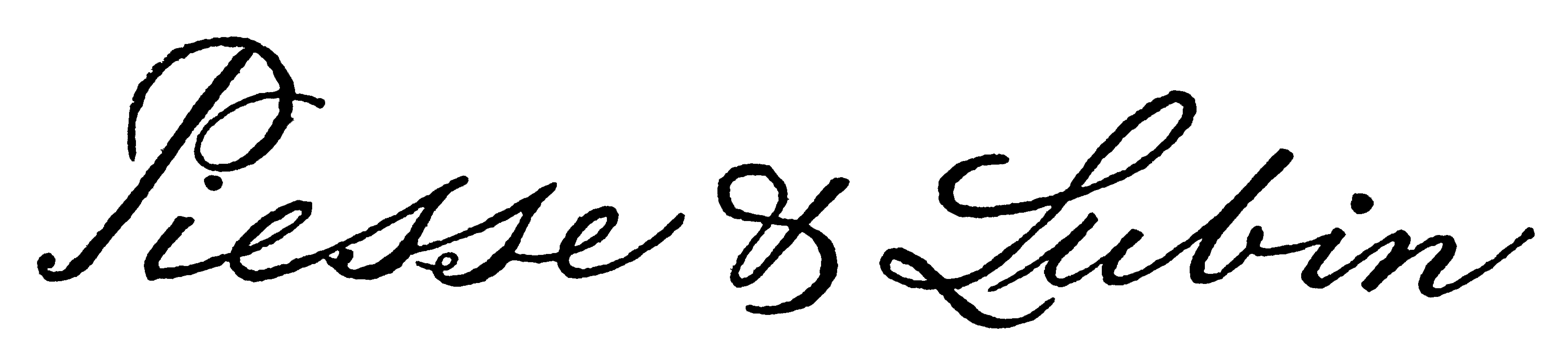
- Company type: private limited company
- Industry: perfume
- Founded: 8 September 1855
- Founders: G. W. Septimus Piesse; Wilhelm Lubin
- Defunct: 1950s
- Headquarters: London
- Brands: Hungary Water; Kiss Me Quick; Opoponax; Frangipanni; Ribon de Bruges

Piesse & Lubin was a luxury perfumery in London. Established in 1855, the company ceased operations in the 1950s.

The perfumery was co-owned by G. W. Septimus Piesse. Little is known about Piesse's partner, Lubin.

Piesse & Lubin created many perfumes, including: The Bath & County Club Perfume 1860, Ambergris 1873, Hungary Water 1873, Kiss Me Quick 1873, Bouquet Opoponax 1875, The Flower of the Day 1875, White Rose 1875, Frangipanni 1880, Kisses 1880, Myrtle 1880, Frolic 1894, Musk-Deer 1900, Ribon de Bruges 1900, Vashti 1900, Opusaya 1901. In an 1862 International exhibition, the company presented scents including 'Perfumes of Paradise', 'Flowers of Scotland' and 'Perfume of Arabia'.

In 1920, the company was purchased by Cussons Sons and Company Ltd Alexander Tom Cussons, the new owner, sent his daughter Marjorie Cussons to work in the company. She learnt about the art of perfumery and prepared the company for its move to Manchester. The company closed in the 1950s.

In 2011, two unopened Piesse & Lubin perfume bottles were discovered in the Mary Celestia, a ship wrecked in 1864 off Bermuda. The perfume was still inside the bottles, apparently uncontaminated by salt water. When researchers opened the bottles, they said that the fragrance still smelled fresh and floral. The fragrance was thought to be 'Bouquet Opoponax,' one of the company's popular products. The bottle contents were analyzed via a gas chromatograph and reproduced by the Bermuda Perfumery in 2014.

== Advertisements ==
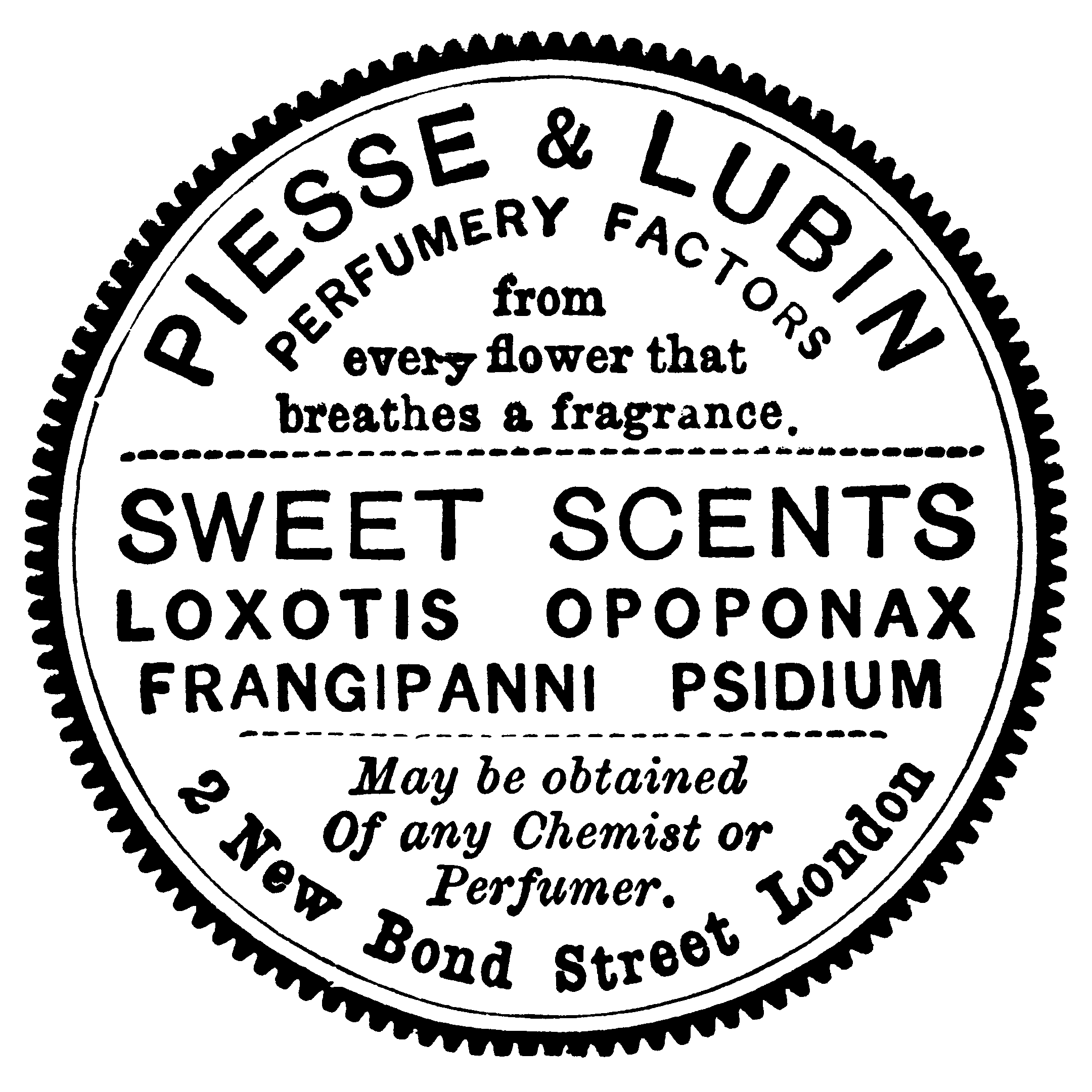
Piesse & Lubin Roundel Advertisement c.1890s

Piesse & Lubin Bath Herbs Crystals Advertisement 1896

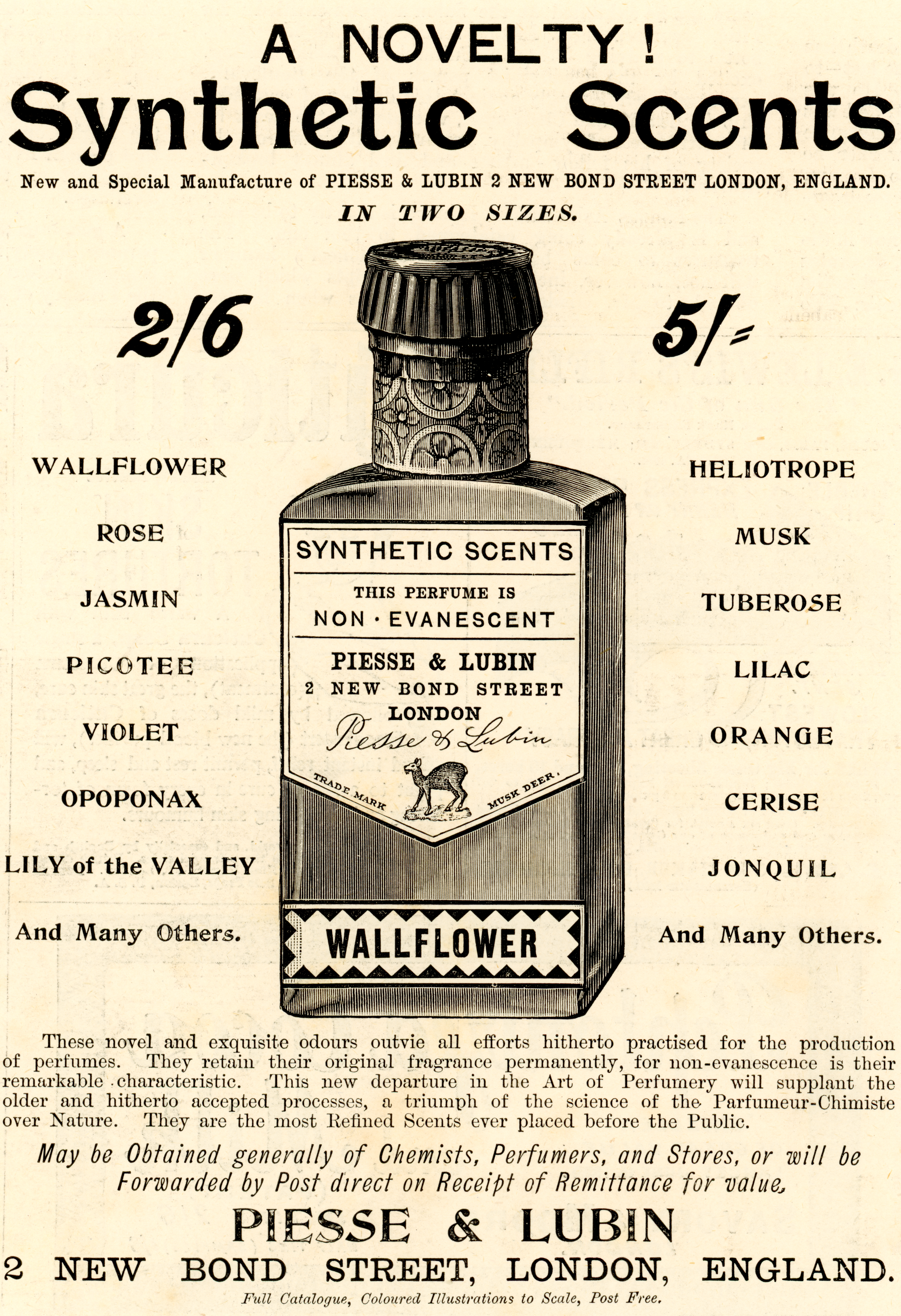
Piesse & Lubin Perfume Newspaper Advertisement 1897

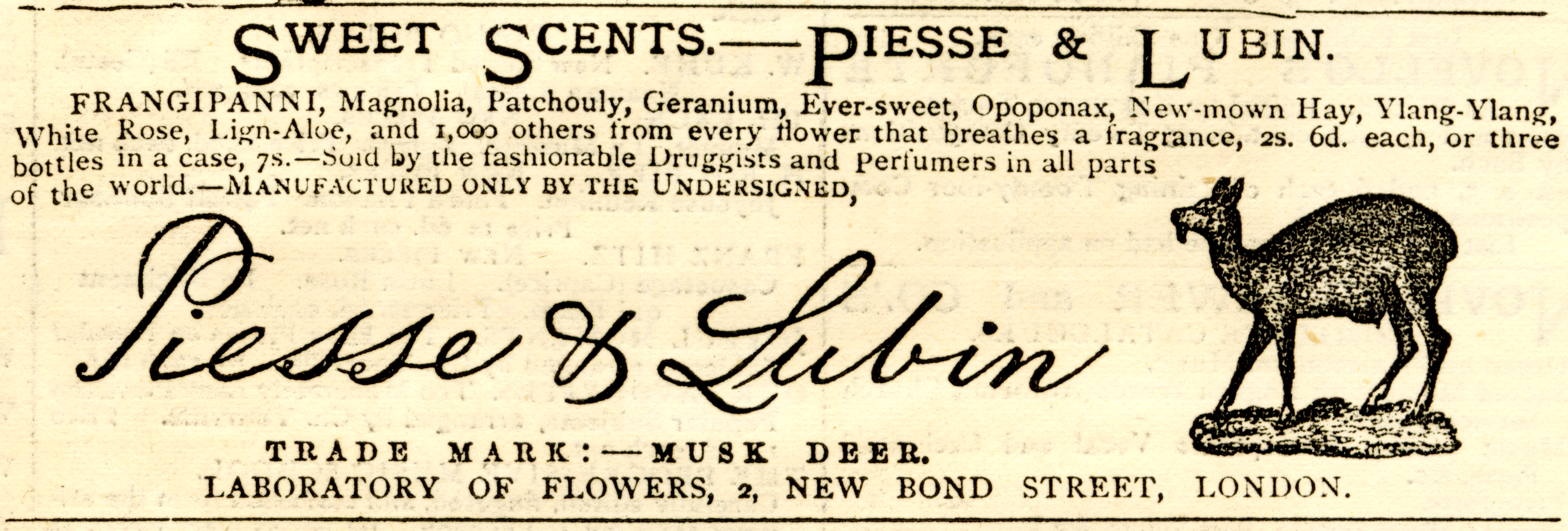
Piesse & Lubin Perfume Newspaper Advertisement 1881
