= George Paterson (businessman) =

George Henry Paterson (1845–1939) was a founder of PZ Cussons, one of the United Kingdom's largest personal health care and consumer goods manufacturing businesses.

== Career ==
Brought up in Scotland, George Paterson initially joined the trading house of Fisher & Randall in Freetown in Sierra Leone, West Africa. In 1879, together with George Zochonis, he founded Paterson Zochonis and built it into a large trading house. It imported West African goods (palm products, nuts, etc.) into the United Kingdom and then exported them to Europe. It also exported British goods (textiles etc.) to West Africa.

George Paterson retired from the Board in 1932 and gradually sold his shares to the Zochonis family. He died in 1939.
