= Cusson =

Cusson may refer to:

- Cusson, Minnesota, an unincorporated community in Leiding Township, Saint Louis County, Minnesota, United States
- Gabriel Cusson (1903–1972), Canadian composer and music educator
- Jean Cusson (born 1942), Canadian professional ice hockey player
- Matt Cusson (fl. 2000–2011), contemporary jazz artist
- Pierre Cusson (1727–1783), French botanist

== See also ==
- Cussons (disambiguation)
