= George Patterson (footballer, born 1934) =

English footballer (1934–2021)

Personal information
- Full name: George Thomas Patterson
- Date of birth: 15 September 1934 (age 92)
- Place of birth: Sunderland, County Durham, England
- Date of death: May 25, 2021 (aged 86)
- Place of death: York, England
- Height: 5 ft 9 in (1.75 m)
- Position: Half-back

Senior career*
Years	Team	Apps	(Gls)
–1952	Silksworth Juniors		
1952–1956	Hull City	7	(1)
1956	King's Lynn		
1956–1957	South Shields		
1957–1960	York City	57	(4)
1960–1961	Hartlepools United	18	(1)
1961–????	Gateshead		
1964–????	Goole Town		
Total		82	(6)
- * Club domestic league appearances and goals

George Thomas Patterson (15 September 1934 – 25 May 2021) was an English professional footballer. He played as a half-back in the Football League for Hull City, York City and Hartlepools United and in non-League football for Silksworth Juniors, King's Lynn, South Shields, Gateshead and Goole Town.

Patterson died on 25 May 2021 at the age of 86 at York Hospital.
