= George Zochonis =

Greek businessman

- Born: George Basil Zochonis c. 1852
- Died: 1929
- Occupation: businessman
- Known for: founder of PZ Cussons
- Relatives: Constantine Zochonis (nephew); Sir John Zochonis (great nephew)

George Basil Zochonis (c. 1852–1929) was a Greek businessman, who was a founder of PZ Cussons, one of the United Kingdom's largest personal health care and consumer goods manufacturing businesses.

== Career ==
Brought up in Greece, George Zochonis initially joined the trading house of Fisher & Randall in Freetown in Sierra Leone. In 1879, together with George Paterson, he founded Paterson Zochonis and built it into a large trading house. It imported West African goods (palm products, nuts etc.) into the United Kingdom and then exported them to Europe. It also exported British goods (textiles etc.) to West Africa.

He died in 1929. After his death control of the business passed to Constantine Zochonis, his nephew, and then more recently, to John Zochonis (Constantine's son).
