= Guts UK =

British health charity

Guts UK, formerly known as the Digestive Disorders Foundation, is the national charity for the digestive system in the UK. Initially set up as a British medical research charity dedicated to the research of digestive disorders, the charity now provides information and support on a range of digestive conditions and symptoms, including through a dedicated Helpline service. Guts UK continues to fund medical research and is the only UK charity funding research into the whole digestive system.

In 1970, the Council of the British Society of Gastroenterology first considered founding a charity to promote research in this speciality. A steering group, chaired by their President at the time, Dr Nelson Coghill, compiled facts and figures which established the importance of digestive disorders as a national health problem. Using this evidence as a basis for appeal, a Digestive Disorders Trust Fund was established.

Dr Thomas Hunt, a founder member of the British Society of Gastroenterology, agreed to launch the new charity. He succeeded in attracting prominent lay and professional support. By 1974 its funds were sufficient to award the first research fellowship and to inaugurate the charity as a Foundation with Hunt as its first President. On his death in 1980, Sir Francis Avery Jones took over the presidency for the next 12 years. Important landmarks during this time were the appointment of the first full-time director, expansion of research support and the development of the successful patient information programme.
