= Smound =

Convergence of scent and sound in the brain

Smound is a perception or sense experience created from the convergence of scents and sounds in the brain. The word is a portmanteau of smell and sound.

== Research by Wesson and Wilson ==
The smound concept is based on a study done by Daniel Wesson, PhD and Donald Wilson, PhD, researchers at the Nathan S. Kline Institute for Psychiatric Research (NKI) in New York City.

The study, which was published in The Journal of Neuroscience, traced extracellular recordings from the olfactory tubercles of anesthetized mice. They found that 65% of single tubercle units responded to odours and 19% responded to auditory tones. When the tubercles were subjected to both odour and tone, 29% displayed supraadditive or suppressive responses. The authors of the study have suggested that this shows some cross-modulation between the two senses.

== Applications ==
Scientific American has suggested that the results of this study could have a major impact on the study of synesthesia. The researchers plan to patent a device for sniffer dogs that would link inhaled scents with a sound, making the operations of these animals more efficient and effective.

== History of the concept ==
The idea that sounds and scents may be linked in the brain was suggested in 1862 by G. W. Septimus Piesse, who said, "Scents, like sounds, appear to influence the olfactory nerve in certain definite degrees." Piesse also suggested that there may be an octave of odour.
