= Manchester Mid-Day Concerts Society =

Musical Society and charity based in Manchester

- Formation: 1915; 111 years ago
- Type: Musical Society
- Registration no.: 224723
- Legal status: Charity
- Purpose: Concerts
- Headquarters: Manchester, UK
- Location: Bridgewater Hall, Manchester
- Activities: Concerts
- Collections: Archives
- Website: www.manchestermiddaymusic.org

The Manchester Mid-Day Concerts Society is a musical society and a registered charity which arranges annual programmes of lunchtime concerts held at the Bridgewater Hall, Manchester.

== History ==
During the First World War, the Committee for Music in Wartime, founded the Concert Series for the purpose of promoting the advancement of music in Manchester: encouraging those musicians whose livelihoods had suffered as a result of the War and boosting morale in local military hospitals. The Inaugural Concert - on 9 November 1915 - was held at the Houldsworth Hall (Church House, Deansgate, Manchester).

Continuing success ensured that the Concert Series continued after the War, and were later organised by the Tuesday Mid-Day Concerts Society (from 1922) to provide very high standard music (at low admission price) and to foster talented young musicians (selected at the Society’s annual auditions). It became a registered charity in 1964.

The Society’s Music Directors have included the Manchester-born pianist Edward Isaacs (1923–53) and violinist Laurance Turner (from 1953) amongst many others. Over the years, Concerts have been held at various locations, such as Manchester’s Houldsworth Hall, Albert Hall and Royal Exchange Theatre.

== Lunchtime Concerts ==
The Society organises a diverse programme of Concerts and, during its history, has programmed more than 2500 performances. In its Centenary Year (2015), the Society welcomed the World Premiere of Edward Gregson’s String Quartet and performances by Jennifer Pike, Mi Luna, Craig Ogden, The Navarra Quartet and Peter Donohoe.

Recent performers have included Sheku Kanneh-Mason, Jess Gillam, Hee-Young Lim, Dominic Degavino, Nathalia Milstein, Florian Mitrea, Jack McNeill, Giovanni Guzzo, Riyad Nicolas, Simon Parkin, Alexey Pudinov, Emily Nebel, Richard Uttley, Luke Jones, Leif Kaner-Lidstrom, Mats Lidstrom and Salih Can Gevrek.

Recent ensembles have included the Manchester Chamber Choir, Aurora Percussion Duo, Klezmer-ish, Trio Zadig, Apollo Saxophone Quartet, Gildas Quartet, K’antu Ensemble, Duo Bauhinia, Maraca2, Clouds Harps Quartet, and Souza Winds.

== Annual Auditions ==
Auditions for emerging musicians from across the United Kingdom and overseas are held in Manchester every year.
