= Leslie Cussons =

Soap manufacturer

- Born: 13 January 1907; Swinton, Lancashire, England, UK
- Died: 6 September 1963 (aged 56); Manchester, England, UK
- Occupation: Businessman
- Spouses: Winsome Wheal (m. 1936) Marie Derlich (m. 1946) Margaret Bevan (m. 1958)
- Parent(s): Alex T. Cussons (1875–1951); Emily Cussons (1875–1957)

Leslie Cussons (13 January 1907 – 6 September 1963) was the Chairman of Cussons Sons & Co, the largest independent soap manufacturer in Britain. Leslie continued manufacturing of the famous brand Cussons Imperial Leather.

== Family ==
Born in Swinton, near Salford, Lancashire, England to Alexander Tom Cussons (1875–1951) and his wife, Emily Jane Cussons (née Kidd; 1875–1957).

== Career ==
Leslie Cussons worked at the Cussons Company from 1924 until his death in 1963. In 1951, he succeeded his father to become chairman of the Cussons Company. He oversaw the acquisition of Gerard Bros. in 1955, and subsequently made extensive improvements to the Gerard Bros Nottingham factory. In 1957, he also acquired the 1001 Carpet Cleaner brand, and made it into Britain's leading carpet cleaner.

In 1963, he showed Prince Philip, Duke of Edinburgh around his factory in Kersal, Salford. Prince Philip was introduced to selected factory staff before unveiling a plaque in the entrance hall.

== Interests ==
Leslie Cussons was keenly interested in agriculture, and owned large farms in Derbyshire and the Isle of Man

He was a tennis enthusiast, having reached the early rounds of Wimbledon, and was president of the Lancashire County Tennis Association.

== Residence ==
He resided at Hale Bank Farm in Altrincham, Cheshire (now Greater Manchester) near Manchester Airport and Ballacotch Manor in the Isle of Man.

Preceded by Alexander Tom Cussons	Chairman of Cussons Sons & Co. 1951–1963	Succeeded by Alexander Stockton Cussons
