= George Patterson (Scottish footballer) =

Scottish footballer

Personal information
- Full name: George Weir Patterson
- Date of birth: 17 January 1909
- Place of birth: Shettleston, Scotland
- Position: Outside forward

Senior career*
Years	Team	Apps	(Gls)
1930–1932	Queen's Park	15	(2)
1935–1936	Romford		

International career
1932–1936	Scotland Amateurs	6	(0)
- * Club domestic league appearances and goals

George Patterson was a Scottish amateur football outside forward who played in the Scottish League for Queen's Park. He was capped by Scotland at amateur level.
