= Thomas Tomlinson Cussons =

Chemist

- Born: 24 November 1838; Hull, England
- Died: 18 March 1927 (aged 88); Matlock, Derbyshire, England
- Occupation: Businessman
- Spouse: Elizabeth Ashton (m. 1867; died 1905)
- Children: John W. Cussons (1867–1922); Alex T. Cussons (1875–1951)
- Parents: George Cussons (1804–1858); Jane Cussons (1804–1882)

Cussons, Son & Co., catalogue from 1898 when Thomas had moved to Swinton, Manchester

Thomas Tomlinson Cussons (24 November 1838 – 18 March 1927) was the head of the British soap manufacturing business Cussons & Son. He established the 'Cussons' brand which has become one of the largest personal care brands in Britain.

== Early life ==
Thomas Cussons was born in Kingston upon Hull, England to George Cussons (1804–1858) and his wife Jane Cussons (née Moss 1804–1882).

== Career ==
Cussons qualified as a member of the Pharmaceutical Society of Great Britain in 1869. After qualifying Cussons opened a chemist in Holbeck, Leeds. In 1879 he sold the Holbeck branch and acquired an existing chemist in Louth. In the early 1880s Cussons opened a chemist in the town of Ossett, where he also operated as a wine merchant. He enjoyed an exclusive right to distribute W & A Gilbey Wines in Ossett. In 1891 he opened a further chemist in Swinton, Salford.

Initially the Cussons brand was attached principally to medicine. In 1893 the Cussons range included the following:

- Cussons "Excelsior" Tic Mixture
- Cussons Compound Rhubarb Pills
- Cussons Antibilious Pills
- Cussons "Excelsior" Black Currant Cough Elixir
- Cussons Effervescing Saline

In 1897 Cussons acquired a glass blowing factory in Harpurhey, which marked the beginning of a great increase in business. Cussons' commercial activities laid the foundations for his son Alexander Tom Cussons, who would make Cussons into a multinational brand and manufacture the famous Cussons Imperial Leather soap.

== Published Letters of Recommendation ==
In 1892 Cussons published extracts from letters of people recommending the Cussons brand.

Below is an extract from a clergyman to Mr. Cussons dated 28 March 1888:

"DEAR SIR,—I have much pleasure in stating that I consider your MIXTURE a most efficacious remedy for Neuralgia or Tic. I have suffered very much and very frequently from this disorder, and have found MORE relief from your Medicine than any other. I can with confidence recommend it to any persons who are troubled with this pain."

Below is an extract from a Mr S. Smith dated 19 March 1888:

"Mr. Cussons—Dear Sir,—It affords me great pleasure to testify to the quality of your Tic Mixture. My wife suffered most excruciating agony in her face, forehead and eyes through Tic or Rheumatism, which gave her no rest. After trying all kinds of remedies which failed, she was induced by a friend, who had had one of your bottles and which had cured two members of her family, to purchase one of your bottles as a trial, which she did, and after taking four doses she felt herself completely cured of pain. I am perfectly satisfied that the Medicine deserves universal praise, and I shall recommend it to all who may be so affected."

Below is an extract from a woman in service, dated 17 March 1888:

"I now hasten to drop you a few lines in reference to the Medicine you sent the other week; well it completely cured me and I have some of it left yet. I suffered awfully you may be sure and could not attend to my household duties. Mistress had to get our charwomen to come and assist her while I was so bad. Please tell Mr. Cussons that through the merits of his Medicine I am quite a new made woman, and I shall always speak well of his Tic Medicine wherever I may be situated."

Preceded by N/A	Head of Cussons & Son Partnership; 1889–1908	Succeeded by Alexander Tom Cussons
