= Alexander Tom Cussons =

Soap manufacturer (1875 - 1951)

- Born: 14 July 1875; Holbeck, Leeds, England, UK
- Died: 20 August 1951 (aged 76); Ruthin Castle, Wales, UK
- Education: Ossett Grammar School, England
- Occupation: Businessman
- Spouse: Emily Jane Kidd (m. 1900)
- Children: Marjorie Cussons (1902–1983); Leslie Cussons (1907–1963); Alex S. Cussons (1914–1986)
- Parents: Thomas Cussons (1838–1927); Elizabeth Cussons (1843–1905)

Alexander Tom Cussons (14 July 1875 – 20 August 1951) was the Chairman of Cussons Sons & Co, the largest independent soap manufacturer in Britain and maker of the brand Cussons Imperial Leather and other personal care products. Cussons was born in Holbeck, Leeds, England to Thomas Tomlinson Cussons (1838–1927) and his wife Elizabeth Cussons (née Ashton, 1843–1905).

== Career ==
Tom Cussons was apprenticed in the town of Ossett. He then moved to Swinton, Salford with his parents. There Tom Cussons worked in partnership with Ernest Jonathan Lake in the firm of Lake, Cussons, and Company. The firm operated as a wholesale druggist until 25 January 1894 when the partnership was dissolved. Tom Cussons then continued in partnership with his father. The family partnership purchased a farm in Kersal in Manchester which was above an old bleach works at the foot of the hill. In 1907 the partnership bought this factory and began manufacturing soap, glass bottles and many other products.

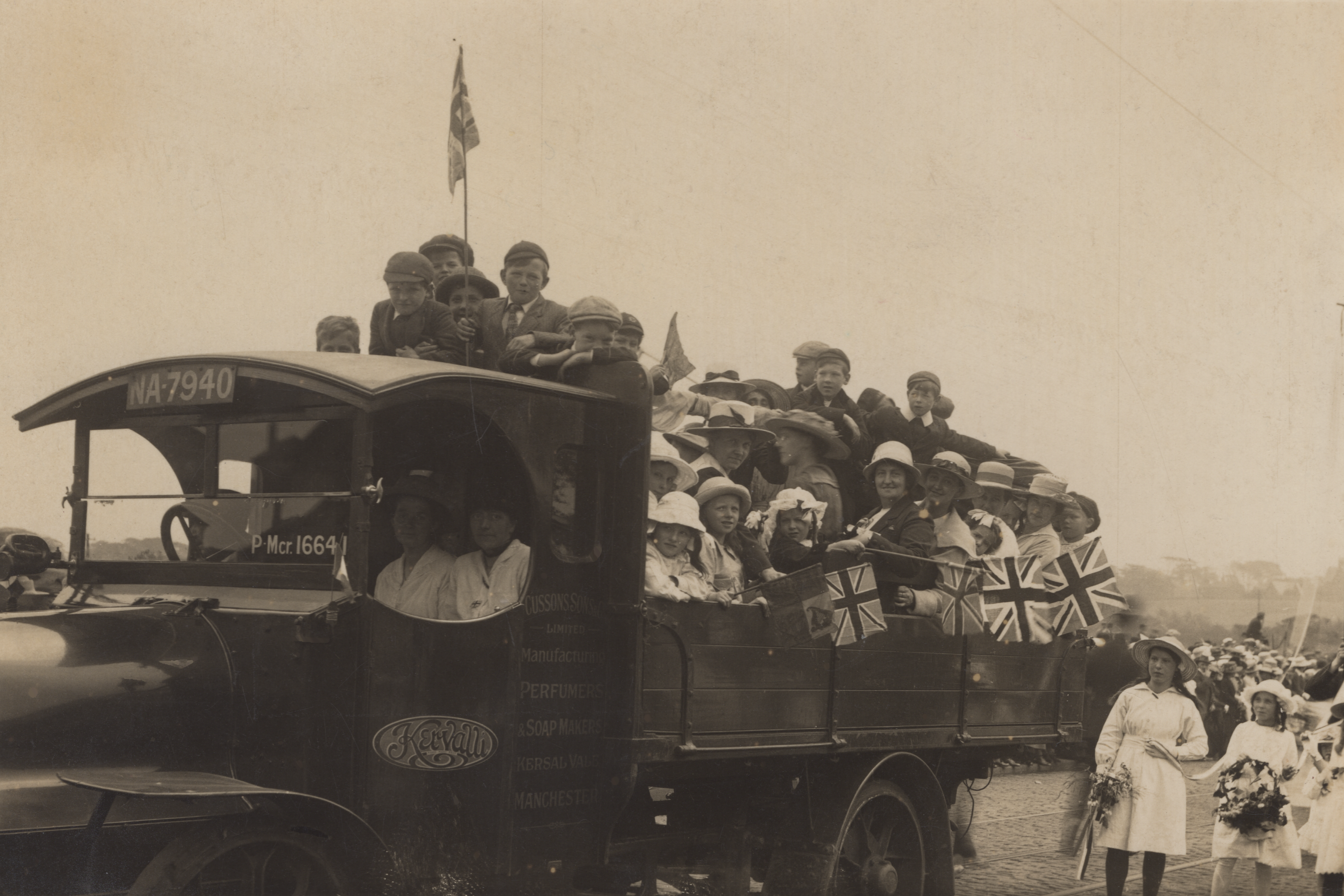
A lorry with the Cussons livery sent by Tom Cussons to join the Amistice Day celebrations 1918

On 31 October 1908 the business was incorporated and Tom Cussons became the first chairman. Under Tom Cussons the company grew. In 1917 Marks & Spencer penny bazaars began to stock Cussons products. In 1920 Cussons purchased an established perfumers named Piesse & Lubin based in London, which was eventually absorbed into the main business in Manchester and ceased to exist in the 1950s. In 1921 Cussons acquired Bayleys of Bond Street. In 1938 the firm began manufacturing the now flagship brand Imperial Leather. In 1947 Cussons Sons & Co became a public company. Cussons grew into a large multinational company, with sales and factories in many Commonwealth countries.

Tom Cussons established the company head office at 84 Brook Street, London in the district of Mayfair. Tom Cussons is best known for manufacturing Imperial Leather soap. However he also manufactured a number of soaps which have since been discontinued. These included Apple Blossom, Linden Blossom, Lilac Blossom and Blue Hyacinth.

== Family ==
Alexander Tom Cussons was the father of three children, with Emily Jane Kidd. The three children were Marjorie Cussons (1902–1983), Leslie Padison Cussons (1907–1963) and Alexander Stockton Cussons (1914–1986).

Marjorie Cussons, later Marjorie Goodwin, was an international hockey player, who played for England before joining Cussons as Marketing Director and developing the Imperial Leather brand throughout the 1940s, 50s and 60s becoming President of the Cussons Group in the 1970s. Marjorie referred to herself and was widely known as 'The Mother of Imperial Leather'. Marjorie married Leslie Goodwin (a Manchester Soap Maker and former managing director of Cussons Sons and Company Ltd). They had two children, Hugh Cussons Goodwin (later Marketing Director of Cussons) and Natalie Jane Goodwin (a qualified concert pianist and later a leading female racing driver in the 1960s becoming British Women's champion three times and the only woman to race professionally at Monaco). Hugh attended Uppingham School and Natalie attended Roedean School.

Leslie Padison Cussons married Winsome Wheal. Leslie soon became the chairman of Cussons Soap from the early 1950s until his death in 1963. Leslie and Winsome had three children, Barry Cussons, who died at about the age of ten, Leslie Nicholas Cussons and Simon Hamish Cussons. Leslie and Simon both attended Oundle School.

Alexander Stockton Cussons was born on 30 December 1914. Schooled near Montreux, in Switzerland, he became fluent in French and German. Whilst he was at school, he played in a jazz band as the drummer. After joining the family firm in Manchester at Cussons Sons and Company limited, his father sent him out to South Africa to run the factory that his sister Marjorie and her husband Leslie Goodwin had founded before the war. Alex served in the South African army during the war. Whilst in South Africa, he met and married Wendy Grace Johnston (born 1 October 1925), on 25 February 1947, Their son, Jeremy Alexander Cussons was born on 2 September 1950 in South Africa, followed by another son, Richard Stockton Cussons (born 1 October 1957). On the death of Leslie (above), Cussons soap was led by Alexander Stockton Cussons, who became chairman from 1963 to 1968, when ill health forced him to retire and move away from the smog and pollution of Manchester to the healthier climate of South Africa. He made a full recovery there and became a director of several companies, as well as owning a beautiful farm in the Natal Midlands, where he farmed Hereford cattle. He became well known and well respected in the business community in Durban and the midlands, and died in 1986 after a debilitating illness that left him bed bound for the last 9 months of his life. Jeremy attended Marlborough school, and was a successful county tennis player during his teens, before he contracted poliomyelitis in 1968 in Germany, where he was treated at Cologne hospital for many months. He recovered and after a brief sojourn in South Africa with his parents, went farming in the Isle of Man. He married Elizabeth and had two children, Leo Alexander, and Angela. The marriage did not last, and he remarried Rebecca, and they had two children, Sebastian and Francesca. Leo currently owns a DIY shop in Port Erin. Angela lives in Oxfordshire. Sebastian is a successful London lawyer. Francesca owns "My Adorable Friend", a business selling natural products for pets. Richard Cussons married Suzanne in 1979 and they have had four children: Julie,(1983) who died at the age of two, Hazel (1985) who lives in Knutsford, Elizabeth (1988) who works in the banking sector in Germany, and Alexandra (1990) who is studying for her M.A. in Psychology. Richard is a committed Christian who studied for his BTh (hons) at Liverpool University, followed by his M.A. in Religion and Theology at Manchester University. He became a lay minister in the Church of England in 1997, and a Local preacher in the Methodist church in 2007, roles he holds jointly, being one of the first to do so after special permission was obtained from the Bishop of Chester following the Anglican Methodist Covenant of 2000. Richard is on the Readers council in the Diocese of Chester, and is District Tutor in the Stockport and Manchester District of the Methodist Church of Great Britain. He has been in retail, when he was Chairman of the Knutsford Chamber of Commerce in the 1990s, and subsequently retrained to be a teacher of Theology and Philosophy at Secondary schools and a VIth form college in Cheshire, a successful change of career move, as he achieved outstanding results for his students. Richard currently runs a Property Management business in Cheshire. Suzanne is a highly qualified Psychotherapist (BSc, BA, MA) with a private practice in Cheshire.

Leslie Nicholas ("Nick") Cussons married Geraldine Mary Ellis in September 1962 in Toft Church, Knutsford, Cheshire. From 1959, Nick Cussons participated in Motorsport, becoming a Historic GT champion in 1992. Nick and Geraldine had two children, Emily Sara Cussons and Benjamin Piers Cussons.

Simon Hamish Cussons married Gillian Margaret Brooksbank in May 1968. Simon became Chairman of Cussons Soap in 1968 when Alex retired due to ill health, and remained Chairman until the business was bought in a takeover by Paterson Zochonis in the 1970s. Simon was Vice Chairman and Executive President of Manchester City Football Club whilst managing the family firm. Simon then went on to be a Cheshire County Councillor in 1981 and Leader of the Conservatives in Cheshire in 1986/7 for many years. After this Simon become the Chairman of NAHAT South Cheshire Health Authority whilst continuing his sporting interests Chairman of BASC, Umpire for Lancashire, golf at Hale and Northop and tennis in Great Budworth. He was a member of the Wine Society and was a keen racegoer at Chester and Bangor. Simon and Gill had two children Lindsay Charlotte Cussons (born 12 November 1968) and Georgia Louise Cussons (born 22 October 1971). Lindsay lives in Chester currently. Georgia married James Haydon Morris (Jim) on 3 July 1999 in Northop Church. Georgia and Jim had three children Amelie Daisy Morris (born 3 January 2004), James Alexander Morris (born 14 September 2005) and Isabella Beatrice Morris (Bella) (born 5 June 2007). Simon died 24 February 2017.

Hugh Cussons Goodwin married Linda Cardwell. They had two children, Alistair and Suzanna Goodwin. Hugh was a talented musician and played in his own jazz band, The Sunset Seven, in the 1950s and 60s with his sister Natalie. They played in the Cavern Club in Liverpool. Hugh and Linda subsequently divorced. Hugh remarried Carol and had many happy years with her, living in Bowdon near Manchester, before he died in 2004 aged 68. Carole, Hugh's second wife died in 2005. Alistair married Mandy Yates and lives in Cheshire and runs a recycling company. Suzanna, who married Charles Elliott, lives In Hale.

Natalie Goodwin married Nick Shrigley-Feigl, the son of Austrian Industrialist Franz Shrigley-Feigl, in 1975. They had two children, Francis Henry Shrigley-Feigl in 1976 and Tanya Jane Shrigley-Feigl in 1977. They lived in Kerfield House in Ollerton, near Knutsford, Cheshire.

== Interests ==
Alexander Tom Cussons was a collector of rare orchids. He was a founding member of the Manchester Orchid Society, since renamed the North of England Orchid Society (NEOS). He was also a founding member of 'The Orchid Club' in 1924, which has since been disbanded. Through his company he donated a trophy to The Orchid Club. Today the trophy is used by the North of England Orchid Society. Regrettably most of the collection was destroyed by a bomb that landed at the bottom of the garden in 1941 and exploded, splintering the glass houses the orchids were kept in and shredding the collection. Profoundly affected by the damage to the collection, he moved away from Salford to South Manchester, where he considered it safer. Tom Cussons put his restored collection up for sale on 24 February 1948. At that time the collection amounted to over 6,000 plants. The collection was kept at Vine Street in Kersal, Salford. Cussons' interest in orchids resulted in Cussons Sons & Co issuing adverts featuring the flower. The adverts showed a picture of Imperial Leather soap surrounded by orchids, with the tagline 'both equally exquisite'.

Tom Cussons was also a collector of tropical fish. They were kept within his orchid houses. His interest in tropical fish resulted in Cussons Sons & Co issuing a series of adverts; the adverts featured Imperial Leather soap surrounded by tropical fish. Later a book inspired by his collection was published.

Tom Cussons was also interested in rugby, and supported the Swinton.

== Residences ==
Tom Cussons owned a Victorian mansion called ‘Oaklands’ in Kersal, Salford. Oaklands had previously been the home of the famous Victorian chemist Edward Schunck (1820-1903). Oaklands was within walking distance of Cussons' factory. However Oaklands was severely damaged in The Blitz of 1941. The property lay in ruins for many years, and over 40 years later was pulled down to build a modern housing estate. Cussons factory at Kersal was demolished in the 2010s to await a similar fate. Tom Cussons later moved to Whitefriars, a house he owned next to the cricket club in Hale Manchester, and not far from the then small Manchester airport, called Ringway, converted after the war into civilian use.

== See also ==
- PZ Cussons

Preceded by Thomas Tomlinson Cussons	Chairman of Cussons Sons & Co. 1908–1951	Succeeded by Leslie Cussons
