= Alexander Stockton Cussons =

Soap manufacturer

- Born: 30 December 1914; Salford, England, UK
- Died: 1986 (aged 71); South Africa
- Education: Chillon College, Villeneuve, Vaud, Switzerland
- Occupations: Businessman, Conservationist
- Spouse: Wendy Grace Johnston (m. 1948)
- Children: 2
- Parent(s): Alex T. Cussons (1875–1951); Emily Cussons (1875–1957)

Alexander Stockton Cussons (1914–1986) was the Chairman of Cussons Group, the largest independent soap manufacturer in Britain. Alexander continued manufacturing of the famous brand Cussons Imperial Leather, and many other products under the Cussons label, including 1001 Carpet Cleaner.

== Family ==
Born in Salford, England to Alexander Tom Cussons (1875–1951) and his wife Emily Jane Cussons (née Kidd; 1875–1957).

== Career ==
Alexander Cussons worked at the Cussons Company from 1931 until his retirement in 1968. Before becoming chairman of the main Cussons Company, he was chairman of the South African subsidiary. South Africa was the first overseas market for the Cussons brand. In 1963, Alexander succeeded his elder brother, Leslie (1907-1963), to become chairman of the Cussons Company. As chairman, Alexander established new factories in Jamaica and Ethiopia. He continued the manufacture of the flagship brand Cussons Imperial Leather and other Cussons branded products. He obtained the rights to manufacture and distribute the German brand Badedas in Britain. Badedas is a bath additive containing extract of horse chestnuts. The launch party was held at the Savoy Hotel. The Badedas brand remains popular in Britain today and has since been acquired by Unilever.

In 1968, he suffered a heart attack which he survived. Subsequently he retired as Chairman of Cussons and moved to Durban, South Africa. This marked the end of a line of family chairmen which went back for over sixty years. Cussons chose as his successor Michael Bucks. Bucks was well qualified for the position. He had extensive experience in company finance, having served as a director for the Rothschild family business. He became a director of several companies following his retirement from Cussons, including the Sylko Paper Company, manufacturing cards, paper and table products.

== Conservation Work ==
Cussons supported conservation efforts and donated land in Shetland, including Ronas Hill (the highest point in Shetland), to become a national nature reserve. He was also a member of the World Wildlife Fund and knew the leading conservationist Sir Peter Scott. He wished to preserve vulnerable and endangered species and considered starting a breeding program in South Africa to help against the threat of extinction.

== Cussons Roses ==
The popular 'Wendy Cussons' Rose was named after Alexander's wife, Wendy. The rose was bred by C. Gregory & Son. Ltd. of Nottingham and released in 1956. The Wendy Cussons rose was globally very successful over many years, winning awards, and is still available in 2023, over 60 years after its introduction. The rose has been depicted on national postage stamps for Hungary, Mongolia and Bhutan. Another rose, Julie Cussons, a salmon-coloured floribunda bred by Gareth Fryer of Knutsford, was named after Alexander's grandchild, Julie, who died at the age of two in 1985.

== Other interests ==
Cussons had many interests, one of which was maritime history and he commissioned a collection of ship models by Donald McNarry. McNarry took eight years to build the collection which featured ships that had sailed round the South African Cape. The collection was temporarily exhibited in London in 1968 before moving to South Africa. The collection was put on public display in the Maritime Museum, Cape Town, South Africa, but can now be found in the City Museum, Durban, South Africa.

He had a large collection of Chinese snuff bottles from the Qing dynasty, which were featured in a number of publications.

Cussons was interested in Roman history, and was involved in campaigning and fundraising for reconstruction efforts on Hadrian's Wall, located at Housesteads. The original plan was to rebuild a 200 yards long section of the wall.

== Residence ==
As Chairman of Cussons, Alexander Cussons resided at Parkdale, Altrincham, Cheshire (now Greater Manchester), which became the head office of the Vegetarian Society. Following his retirement, Alexander moved to Dalcrue Farm, Natal, South Africa. He died in South Africa at age 71.

Preceded by Leslie Cussons	Chairman of Cussons Group; 1963–1968	Succeeded by Michael Bucks
