= Imperial Leather =

British soap and toiletries brand

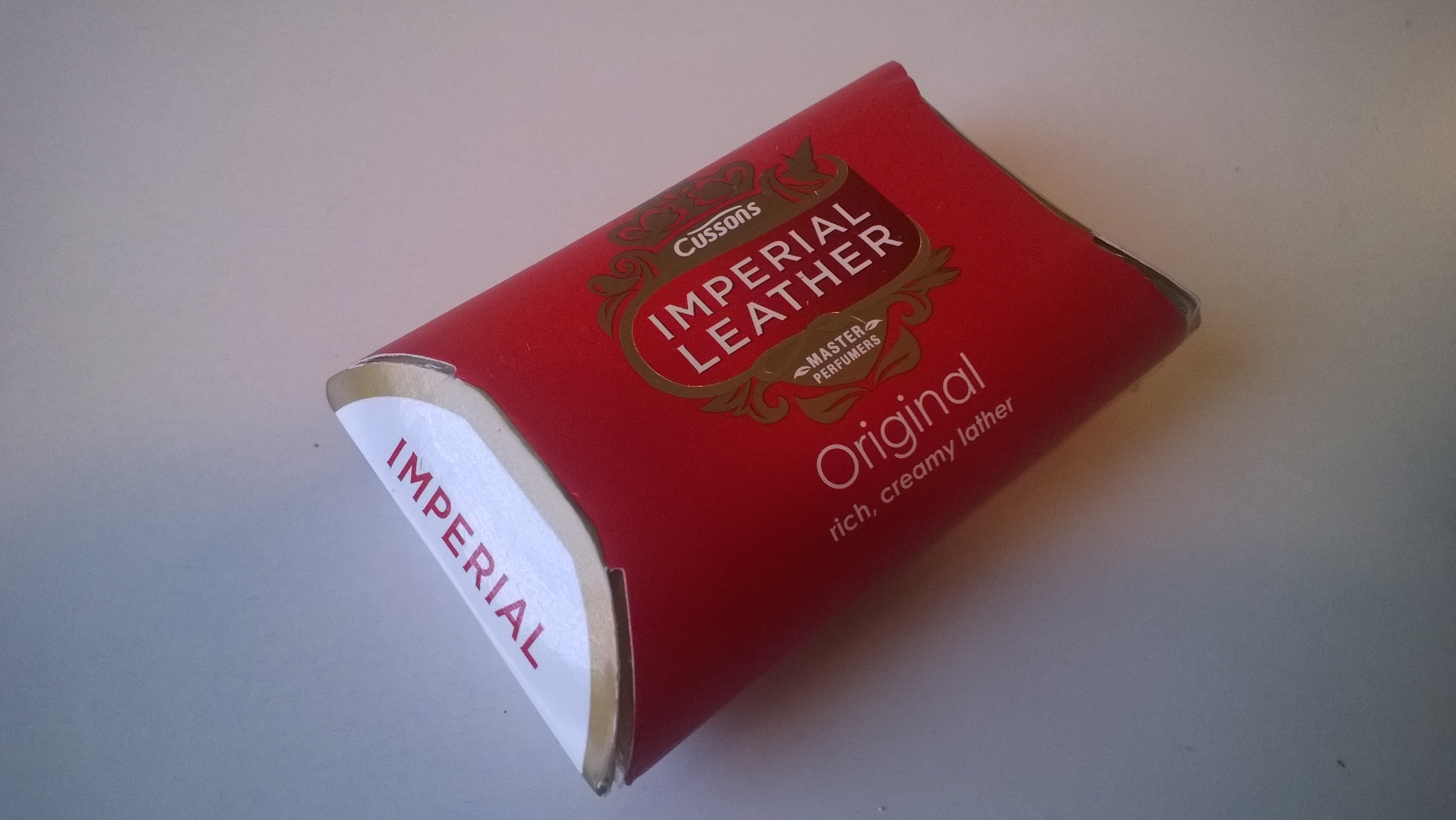
A bar of Imperial Leather soap

Imperial Leather is a British brand of soaps, toiletries, and healthcare products manufactured by PZ Cussons. Its distinctive aroma is inspired by Russia leather.

== Origins ==
The brand name had its origin in 1768 when Russian nobleman Count Grigory Orlov commissioned a brand of perfume from Bayleys of Bond Street in London. The perfume was called 'Eau de Cologne Imperiale Russe'. Russia leather was a high-quality leather exported widely from Russia and recognisable by a distinctive aroma from its birch oil tanning process. In 1921 Bayleys was acquired by Cussons Sons & Co, owned by Alexander Tom Cussons. It was not until some years later in 1938 that, using a version of the original perfume, the soap 'Imperial Leather' was created by Cussons. The soap was initially called 'Russian Leather' but was soon renamed 'Imperial Leather'. In 1975 the Cussons Group was itself acquired by Paterson Zochonis, and renamed PZ Cussons in 2002.

== Advertising ==
=== World War II ===
In 1942 due to World War II all soaps were rationed in Britain. Imperial Leather soap was therefore marketed as being the best choice because it lasted longer than other soaps. The following is an extract from a World War II advertisement:

"Imperial Leather Toilet Soap is one of the few luxuries still available to the discriminating. Supplies are obviously limited, but if only because Imperial Leather lasts longer and increases the purchasing power of your coupons, you should buy it wherever and whenever you can."

=== Themed printed advertisements (1940s–1950s) ===
During the 1940s to late 1950s Cussons Sons and Company Ltd embarked upon a prolific printed advert campaign with a new theme for the advertising of Imperial Leather released every year. The advertising campaign was under the direction of Alexander Tom Cussons' daughter Marjorie Goodwin (née Cussons). The adverts have become collectable as vintage adverts. Below is a table of some of the advertising themes:

Date	Advertising Theme	Artist
1948	Orchids	Cedric Chater
1950	Tropical Fish	Cedric Chater
1951	Butterflies	Cedric Chater
1952	Treasure Exquisite	
1953	Miniature Gardens	Cedric Chater
1954	The Language of the Fan	J. Duvelleroy
1955	Exotic Beauty (Cactuses)	Norman Weaver
1956	A Garden of Birds	Charles Tunnicliffe
1957	Roses	Cedric Chater
1958	Zodiac and Birthstones	

=== Print (1980s to present) ===
In 1988, Cussons selected French model Estelle Lefébure for their printed Imperial Leather advertisements.

In 2013, Cussons ran a series of printed adverts for the Imperial Leather Foamburst range with a genie theme and the tagline "release the lather, feel the magic".

=== Television ===
Television has been an important part of Imperial Leather advertising for decades. Amongst the most popular Imperial Leather adverts were the ‘triple bath’ series. This series of adverts began in the 1970s and continued into the 1980s. The adverts featured a family of three, each in three separate baths, using Imperial Leather whilst travelling to an exotic location by train, plane or spacecraft.

Imperial Leather adverts have previously featured Richard Stapley, Paolo Di Canio, Ralph Ineson, Julie Walters and Paul Merton. The Julie Walters advert featured her singing, with the final line "Imperial Leather: our only comfort in life." The Paul Merton series of adverts included a commercial where he attempts to interview an unsuspecting man in the shower and a further commercial where he wears a lab coat and conducts an experiment on identical twins.

More recent Imperial Leather television adverts include the rose tattoo (1999), the firemen fantasy (2002), the footballer fantasy (2002), the dancing duck (2002) and the secret shower advert (2005).

== Sponsoring ==
Cussons Imperial Leather sponsored the XIX World Modern Pentathlon Championships, held in London in 1973.

Cussons Imperial Leather sponsored the XVII Commonwealth Games, held in Manchester in 2002. In 2004 Imperial Leather sponsored the TV show Ant & Dec's Saturday Night Takeaway. In 2004 Imperial Leather also sponsored a model cow called Imperial Heifer. The cow was on public display in Manchester. The model was later sold at auction with money donated to the Manchester Kids charity.

In 2004, Imperial Leather sponsored a theme park ride called The Flume which opened at Alton Towers. Also, in 2006, Bubbleworks was opened at Chessington World of Adventures sponsored by the company. Both rides had the same 'bath time with attitude' theme with many rubber ducks. Original Source, another PZ Cussons product sponsored a ride called Tidal Wave at Thorpe Park. The contract with the rides ended in 2009, the rides had all of the Imperial Leather logos removed.

Imperial Leather was a sponsor of the 2011 Australian Open tennis tournament in Melbourne. The Imperial Leather logo was depicted on the players' chairs.

== Discontinued and revived products ==
In the 1950s a number of Imperial Leather products were manufactured which have since been discontinued, although some have later returned. The discontinued products include Imperial Leather Cologne (Cussons branded version of the original product), Imperial Leather Brilliantine (solid and as lotion), Imperial Leather After Shave Lotion, Imperial Leather Bath Cubes, Imperial Leather Shaving Stick, Imperial Leather Shaving Bowl and Imperial Leather Shaving Cream. Below is an extract from a 1957 advert for Imperial Leather Shaving Stick:

"Cussons’ Imperial Leather is the choice of men of fame and men of promise. It is the choice of men of good taste."

In Australia, two of these products have fairly recently returned in a new attempt to diversify the brand. The Imperial Leather Shaving Cream and the After Shave Lotion have returned to supermarkets in that country, in two varieties (Original Red and Vertigo Grey), and are joined by Imperial Leather Deodorant and a range of bodywash and handwash lotions. The bodywash and handwash lotions do not come in the original Imperial Leather scent, despite making use of the brand name, but instead come in various other exotic variations such as ‘Japanese Spa’.

== Toys ==
Die-cast toy vans have been manufactured with the Cussons Imperial Leather livery. There are two different types. Both have been discontinued and are collectable. They are an Austin A40 van made by Lledo (released in 1997) and a 30 cwt Bedford van also made by Lledo.

An Imperial Leather yellow duck beanie was produced as part of the promotion for a 2001 relaunch.
