= PZ Cussons =

Manufacturer of personal healthcare products and consumer goods

PZ Cussons plc
- Type: Public Company
- Traded as: LSE: PZC
- Industry: personal healthcare; consumer goods
- Founded: 20 February 1884; 142 years ago
- Founders: George Paterson; George Zochonis
- Headquarters: Manchester, England
- Key people: Caroline Silver (Chair); Jonathan Myers (CEO)
- Products: Imperial Leather; soaps; shampoos; shower gels; cosmetics; detergents
- Revenue: ▲£541.4 million (2026)
- Operating income: ▲£86.8 million (2026)
- Net income: ▲£28.4 million (2026)
- Number of employees: 2,000 (2026)
- Website: www.pzcussons.com

PZ Cussons plc is a major British manufacturer of personal healthcare products and consumer goods. It operates worldwide, especially in nations in Africa, and the Commonwealth. The company is listed on the London Stock Exchange.

== History ==
=== Paterson Zochonis (PZ) (1884–1929) ===
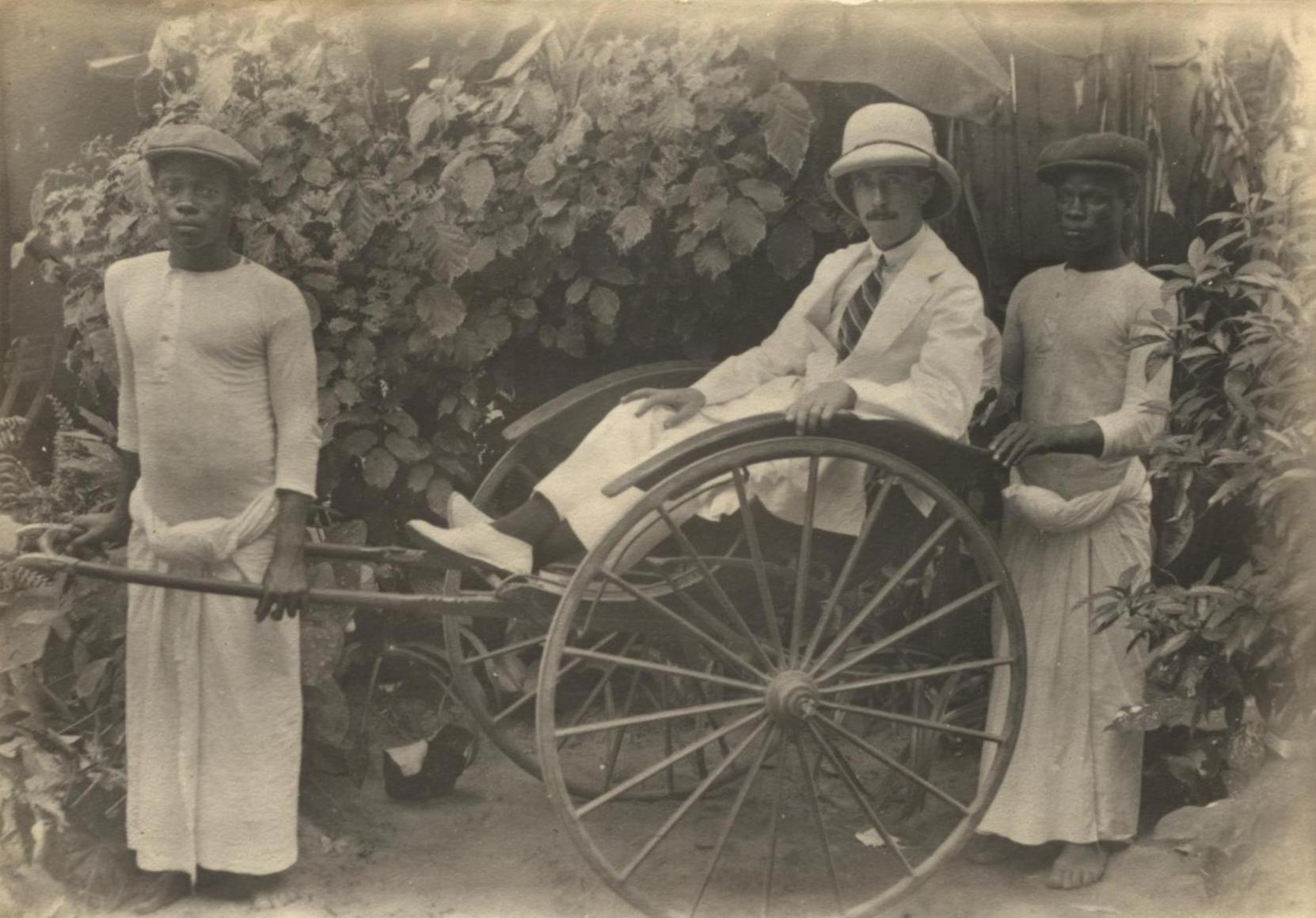
Representative of the Paterson Zochonis in a rickshaw with two boys, Nigeria, c. 1910

The company was formed by George Zochonis and George Paterson as a commodity trading business in the Sierra Leone Colony and Protectorate under the name Paterson Zochonis (PZ) in 1884. It expanded its operations into what is now Nigeria before the end of the nineteenth century.

=== PZ (1929–1951) ===
Paterson Zochonis expanded considerably under Constantine Zochonis between 1929 and 1951, when as chairman he acquired factories and established offices in Ghana and Kenya. Under the management of C.P. Zochonis, PZ invested in its host countries by opening factories and shops there. In 1948, PZ took over a Nigerian soap manufacturer. "This proved to be a landmark in the company's history, as soap was to become a major part of its trade". However, under the management of C.P. Zochonis, the company allowed colonial attitudes to affect local African peoples.

=== PZ and PZ Cussons (1951–2006) ===
From 1951, Alexander Loupos, cousin of Constantine Zochonis, took over PZ as chairman. John Zochonis became chairman in the 1970s. Paterson Zochonis continued to expand under John Zochonis, It was one of three or four firms which commercially dominated Guinea as a colony before 1958.

The company acquired Cussons Group (founded by Thomas Cussons) from the Cussons family in 1975. Offices and factories were established in Thailand and Indonesia in 1986 and 1988 respectively.

The company bought the state owned Pollena Wroclaw in Poland in 1993, followed in 1995 by Pollena Uroda, and in 2002, Paterson Zochonis plc was renamed PZ Cussons plc. PZ Cussons sold the brand 1001 Carpet Cleaner in February 2004 to the American WD40 Company for £6.2 million. PZ Cussons closed its factory in Nottingham in February 2005 (founded by Gerard Bros.) and relocated the operations to Thailand.

=== PZ (from 2006) ===
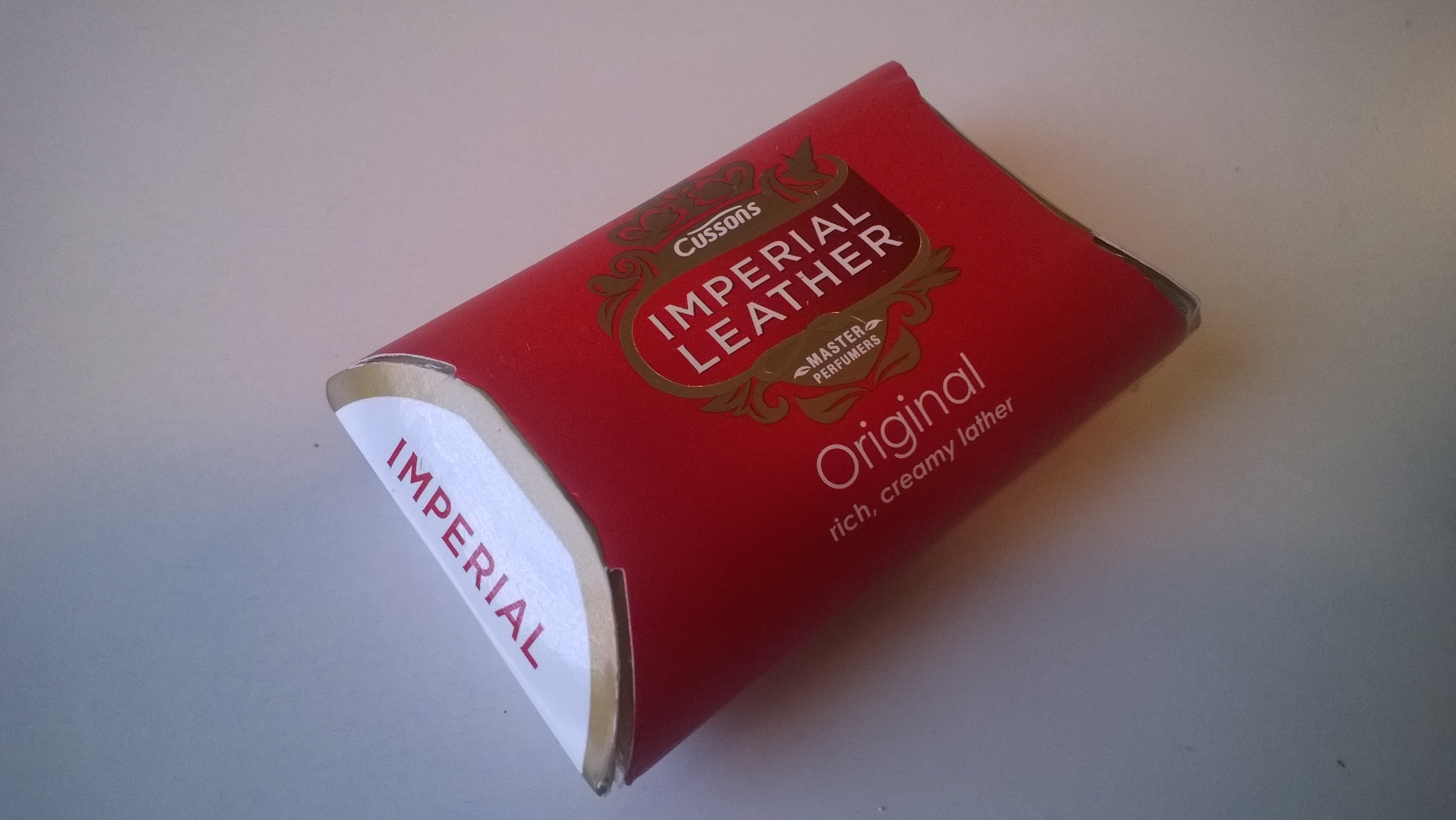
An Imperial Leather soap bar (2016)

PZ Cussons announced new plans in August 2006 to move its remaining factory in England from Kersal to Swinton, both in the City of Salford.

PZ Cussons acquired the Sanctuary Spa and Sanctuary products business in January 2008 for £75 million. Alex Kanellis, who had been chief executive officer since June 2006, stepped down from that position in December 2019. The company announced that Jonathan Myers would be the new chief executive officer effective from 1 May 2020.

== Operations ==
PZ Cussons Group has a marketing presence in Europe, Africa and Asia.

PZ Cussons until recently had factories in Salford, Nigeria, Thailand, Indonesia, Australia, Greece, Kenya, and Poland. The factories in Greece and Poland, together with local commercial operations were sold in the summer of 2012 as part of an initiative to focus on core business.

PZ Cussons' main brand is the Imperial Leather range of soaps, bath and shower and cosmetic products. PZ Cussons operates a joint venture electrical superstore, Haier Thermocool, in Lagos, Nigeria and also operates in Ghana. The largest single market for PZ Cussons is Nigeria. This is served by the subsidiary company PZ Cussons Nigeria Plc, which employs over 3,500 people and is listed on the Nigerian Stock Exchange.
