= Nankin, Queensland =

Nankin
- Suburb
- Interactive map of Nankin
- Coordinates: 23.4283°S 150.6902°E
- Country: Australia
- State: Queensland
- LGA: Livingstone Shire
- Location: 15.0 km (9.3 mi) E of Rockhampton CBD; 35.6 km (22.1 mi) SW of Yeppoon; 656 km (408 mi) NNW of Brisbane

Government
  - State electorate: Keppel
  - Federal division: Capricornia

Area
  - Total: 194.6 km^{2} (75.1 sq mi)

Population
  - Total: 176 (2021 census)
  - Density: 0.9044/km^{2} (2.342/sq mi)
- Time zone: UTC+10:00 (AEST)
- Postcode: 4701
Suburbs around Nankin
Mount Archer; Lakes Creek	Mount Chalmers	Tungamull
Nerimbera	Nankin	Joskeleigh
Midgee	Port Alma	Thompson Point

Nankin is a rural locality in the Livingstone Shire, Queensland, Australia. In the 2021 census, Nankin had a population of 176 people.

== Geography ==
The now-closed Emu Park railway line entered the locality from the west (Nerimbera) and exits to the north. Four now-abandoned stations served the locality:

- Nankin Junction railway station (23.3886°S 150.6307°E)
- Leaholme railway station (23.3652°S 150.6474°E)
- Coolcorra railway station (23.3566°S 150.6554°E)
- Sleipner Junction railway station (23.3468°S 150.6614°E)

The now-closed branch line to Broadmount separated from the Emu Park railway line at Nankin Junction and travelled to the south-west (now Thompson Point) through the following abandoned railway stations within the locality (from west to east):

- Crescent View railway station (approx 23.4246°S 150.6792°E)
- Meadows railway station (approx 23.4311°S 150.6929°E)
- Balnagowan railway station (approx 23.4574°S 150.7214°E)

The Rockhampton–Emu Park Road runs through from south-west to north-west.

== History ==
Nankin Junction Provisional School opened in 1899. On 1 January 1909, it became Nankin Junction State School. It closed circa 1940. The school was on the north-eastern corner of the railway line and Thompsons Point Road, approx 71 Thompson Point Road (23.38675°S 150.63224°E).

== Demographics ==
In the 2016 census, Nankin had a population of 170 people.

In the 2021 census, Nankin had a population of 176 people.

== Education ==
There are no schools in Nankin. The nearest government primary schools are Lakes Creek State School in neighbouring Lakes Creek, Rockhampton, to the north-west, Coowonga State School in Coowonga to the north, and Keppel Sands State School in Keppell Sands to the north-east. The nearest government secondary schools are North Rockhampton State High School in Frenchville, Rockhampton, to the north-west and Yeppoon State High School in Yeppoon to the north.
