= Thompson Point, Queensland =

Thompson Point
- Suburb
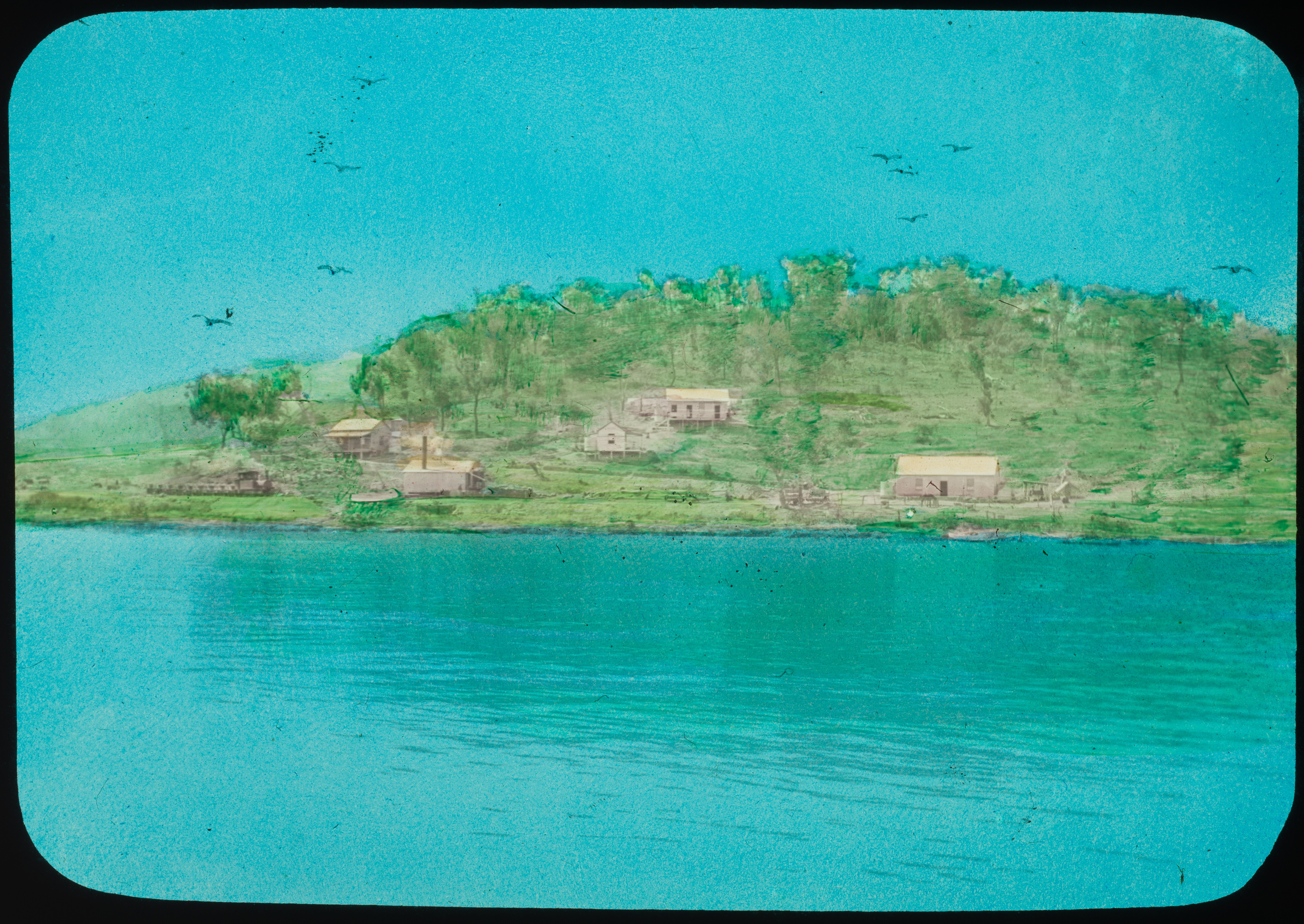
- Houses on Thompson Point (probably the Broadmount area), circa 1910

- Interactive map of Thompson Point
- Coordinates: 23.4747°S 150.8402°E
- Country: Australia
- State: Queensland
- LGA: Livingstone Shire
- Location: 41.1 km (25.5 mi) SE of Rockhampton CBD; 48.0 km (29.8 mi) S of Keppel Sands; 52.7 km (32.7 mi) SSW of Emu Park; 58.6 km (36.4 mi) S of Yeppoon; 655 km (407 mi) NNW of Brisbane

Government
  - State electorate: Keppel
  - Federal divisions: Capricornia; Flynn

Area
  - Total: 251.2 km^{2} (97.0 sq mi)

Population
  - Total: 0 (2021 census)
  - Density: 0.0000/km^{2} (0.000/sq mi)
- Time zone: UTC+10:00 (AEST)
- Postcode: 4702
Suburbs around Thompson Point
Joskeleigh	Joskeleigh	Coral Sea
Nankin	Thompson Point	Curtis Island
Nankin	Port Alma	The Narrows

Thompson Point is a coastal locality in the Livingstone Shire, Queensland, Australia. It was the site of a short-lived town and port called Broadmount. In the 2021 census, Thompson Point had "no people or a very low population".

== Geography ==
The locality is bounded to the east by the Coral Sea and to the south by the Fitzroy River which enters the Coral Sea at the south-east of the locality.

There are also two neighbourhoods in the locality:

- Gridiron (23.5°S 150.7833°E)
- Eureka Flat (23.4833°S 150.7833°E)

The undeveloped town of Broadmount is within the locality on the northern bank of the Fitzroy River (23.4986°S 150.7946°E).

The locality contains the following mountains (from west to east):

- Mount Kilner (23.4727°S 150.7546°E) 355 metres (1,165 ft)
- Broadmount (23.4699°S 150.7662°E) 405 metres (1,329 ft)
- West Arm Hill (23.4956°S 150.8092°E) 166 metres (545 ft)
- Red Hill (23.4438°S 150.8164°E) 50 metres (160 ft)

Thompson Point has the following ranges:

- Flat Top Range extending from Nankin into the north-west of the locality (23.4043°S 150.7105°E)
- Ross Range extending from Nankin/Joskeleigh into the north-east of the locality through to Red Hill (23.4094°S 150.7780°E)

A number of creeks flow through the locality (from west to east by mouth):

- Back Creek, a tributary of the Fitzroy River (23.4939°S 150.7496°E)
- Barramundi Creek, a tributary of the Fitzroy River (23.5036°S 150.8244°E)

Balnagowan Dam is a reservoir (23.4477°S 150.7616°E), originally built to support the town of Broadmount and to provide water for the steam trains operating on the line.

The locality has the following headlands (from west to east):

- Thompson Point, along the Fitzroy River (23.4916°S 150.7377°E)
- Botany Point, along the river (23.4999°S 150.7624°E)
- Ledge Point, along the river (23.5023°S 150.7867°E)
- West Arm Point, along the river (23.5035°S 150.8210°E)
- Datum Point, along the river (23.5068°S 150.8492°E)
- Cattle Point, along the Coast Sea (23.4784°S 150.8700°E)

Rundle Beach is between Datum Point and Cattle Point (23.5012°S 150.8591°E).

The mouth of the Fitzroy River contains three named islands (from west to east):

- Egg Island, a 65.2-hectare (161-acre) marine island (23.5219°S 150.8306°E).
- Mud Island, a 2.8-square-kilometre (1.1 sq mi) marine island (23.5272°S 150.8517°E).
- Mackenzie Island, a 1.8-square-kilometre (0.69 sq mi) marine island (23.5112°S 150.8621°E).

Rocky Point Reach is the reach of the Fitzroy River to the south of Egg and Mud Islands (23.5291°S 150.8347°E).

== History ==
The town of Broadmount was originally named Herbert, but was renamed after the mountain Broadmount, which was named by Matthew Flinders on 10 August 1802 during his explorations on HM Sloop Investigator.

On 30 January 1866, the Queensland Government began to sell town lots in the town of Herbert (as the town of Broadmount was then called). In 1874 it was noted that none of the land sold at Herbert had been developed due to its inaccessibility overland to Rockhampton.

Although Rockhampton (further upstream on the Fitzroy River) was a major port, as ships became larger, the river was not deep enough to accommodate them, resulting in Rockhampton being bypassed by ships or by the inefficient practice of ships being unloaded into small lighters in Keppel Bay for the remainder of the journey to Rockhampton. As the Fitzroy River at Broadmount had 4 fathoms (24 ft; 7.3 m) of water even at low tide, it was sufficient for even the largest ships of that time, but Broadmount was not accessible by rail. However, the construction of North Rockhampton to Emu Park railway line in 1888 brought the railway closer to Broadmount.

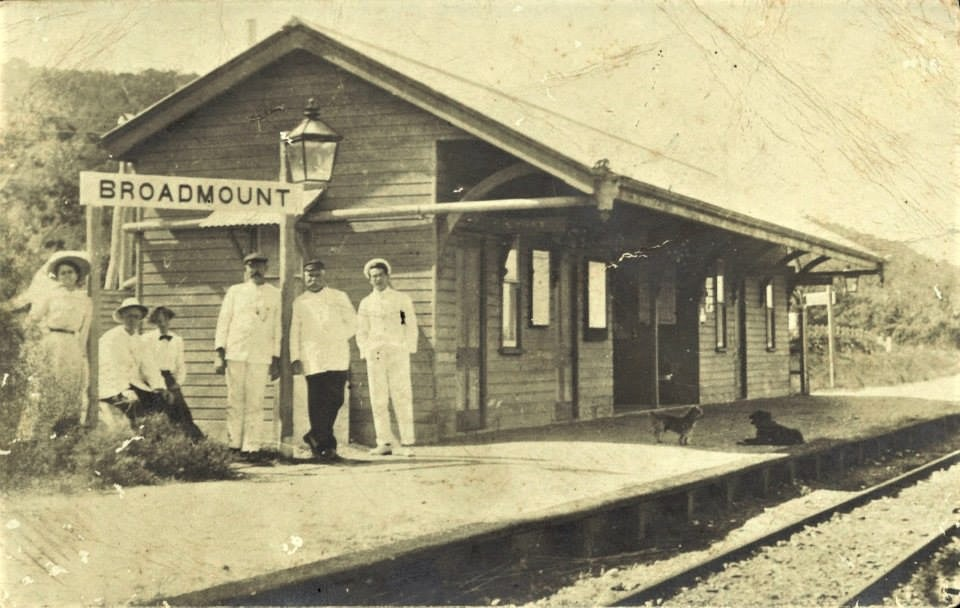
Broadmount Railway Station, circa 1910

On 26 September 1895, the Queensland Government announced that it would build a new section railway line to Herbert/Broadmount, branching off the Emu Park line at a new Nankin Junction railway station. By November 1895 work had commenced on building a wharf at Broadmount and on the detailed survey of the railway route. In January 1896 a provisional hotel licence was issued to Joseph Cunningham who was constructing a hotel on the corner of Wharf and Carl Streets in Broadmount. The railway was complete and able to be used by October 1897 but the wharf was not yet complete. The Balnagowan Dam was built on the Balnagowan pastoral run in 1898 to supply Broadmount and the railway with water. On 1 January 1898, railway services commenced on the new branch railway, which opened without any ceremony and despite the wharf still being 10 weeks from completion. The journey between North Rockhampton railway station and Broadmount railway station took one and a quarter hours. However, there were delays on completing the wharf and disagreements over the dredging of a channel to the wharf. In February 1899, the coastal steamer Premier was forced to use Broadmount wharf during the flooding in Rockhampton, becoming a regular arrangement. In June 1899, the Alexandria Bridge rail bridge over the Fitzroy River in Rockhampton was opened, enabling cargo landed at the new port at Broadmount to travel throughout the Central Queensland railway network.

The locality was served by two railway stations (from west to east):

- Thompson's Point railway station (approx 23.4839°S 150.7376°E)
- Broadmount railway station

Broadmount Provisional School opened circa May 1901 and closed circa 1906 due to low student numbers.

In August 1905, the Queensland Government agreed to the establishment of a provisional school near Thompson's Point (the headland) as there were 31 children living in the area. Thompson's Point Provisional School opened on Monday 19 February 1906 with the opening celebrated with a concert and dance on Saturday 10 February 1906. By that time there were over 60 children enrolled. The school was built to be portable as it was believed that it might no longer be needed once all the harbour improvements were completed. On 1 January 1909, it became Thompson's Point State School It had some temporary closures due to low student numbers before it permanently closed in 1929. It was located near the Thompson's Point railway station on Broadmount Road (approx 23.4836°S 150.7378°E).

Broadmount's role as a port was soon in doubt due to ongoing issues with dredging which prevented it from accommodating the largest ships. In December 1903 the North Coast railway line between Rockhampton and Gladstone was opened and Gladstone's excellent harbour become the preferred port for Central Queensland. Attempting to protect their investment in Broadmount, the government introduced a system of higher freight charges on that line to discourage its use in favour of using Broadmount port. In 1912, a railway line was built to Port Alma which had better deepwater facilities than Broadmount and the port at Broadmount became a "white elephant". The Broadmount railway line was closed on 19 August 1929, effectively closing the port. In September 1930, the wharf at the port was damaged in a fire.

== Demographics ==
In the 2016 census, Thompson Point had a population of 10 people.

In the 2021 census, Thompson Point had "no people or a very low population".

== Education ==
There are no schools in Thompson Point. The nearest government primary schools are Lakes Creek State School in Lakes Creek to the north-west and Keppel Sands State School in Keppel Sands to the north. The nearest government secondary schools are North Rockhampton State High School in Frenchville to the north-west and Yeppoon State High School in Yeppoon to the north.

== Amenities ==
There is a boat ramp and floating walkway at the southern end of Thompson Point Road (23.4884°S 150.7361°E) providing access to the Fitzroy River. It is managed by the Livingstone Shire Council.
