= Rockhampton–Emu Park Road =

Road in Queensland, Australia

Rockhampton–Emu Park Road Queensland

General information
- Type: Road
- Length: 44.1 km (27 mi)
- Route number(s): (Berserker - Emu Park)

Major junctions
- South-west end: Rockhampton–Yeppoon Road Berserker
- Keppel Sands Road; Tanby Road
- North-east end: Scenic Highway, Emu Park

Location(s)
- Major suburbs: Lakes Creek, Nerimbera, Tungamull

Rockhampton–Emu Park Road is a continuous 44.1 kilometres (27.4 mi) road route in the Rockhampton and Livingstone local government areas of Queensland, Australia. The route is designated as State Route 4 (Regional) and Tourist Drive 10. It is a state-controlled regional road (number 194).

== Route description ==
Rockhampton–Emu Park Road commences at an intersection with the Rockhampton–Yeppoon Road in Berserker, a suburb of Rockhampton. Starting as Bridge Street it runs south-east and then turns east as Lakes Creek Road, running along the boundary between Berserker and The Common. It runs through the southern part of Koongal and then turns south-east, following the Fitzroy River through Lakes Creek. It enters Nerimbera and continues south-east for a short distance before turning north-east. It continues north-east through Nankin to Tungamull, where it passes the exit to Keppel Sands Road (see below) to the southeast. It then passes through Coowonga and Coorooman before turning east through the southern tip of Tanby and entering Emu Park.

Land use along the road is mainly rural, but with business and residential developments at each end.

== Road condition ==
The road is fully sealed, with almost no dual carriageway. The following projects aim to improve the condition of sections of this road.

=== Road train access to Rockhampton ===
The project for upgrading between Gracemere saleyards and the Rockhampton abattoirs to provide access for Type 1 Road Trains, funded by the Northern Australia Beef Roads Program, was completed by early 2021 at a total cost of $30 million. It involved about 29 kilometres (18 mi) of road improvements on four roads:

- Capricorn Highway – from Saleyards Road at Gracemere to the Bruce Highway roundabout at Rochhampton (7.7 kilometres (4.8 mi)).
- Bruce Highway – from the Capricorn Highway roundabout to the Yaamba Road intersection (8.3 kilometres (5.2 mi)).
- Rockhampton–Yeppoon Road – from the Bruce Highway intersection south-west to the Emu Park Road intersection (2.4 kilometres (1.5 mi).
- Rockhampton–Emu Park Road – from the Rockhampton–Yeppoon Road intersection to St Christophers Chapel Road at Nerimbera (10.2 kilometres (6.3 mi)).

=== Overtaking lanes and safety improvements ===
A project to provide overtaking lanes and priority safety and capacity improvements, at a cost of $19 million, is planned for construction from late 2022 to mid-2024.

== History ==
The Archer brothers established the Gracemere pastoral run in 1855, on land that included the present site of Rockhampton. They made use of the Fitzroy River for shipping supplies and produce, and built a woolshed on the river bank. They also played a role in coining the name "Rockhampton" for their riverside worksite. Permanent settlement at the town site began in 1856, and the town was proclaimed and surveyed in 1858. The region expanded quickly due to good available land and water. Land to the north of the river was opened for settlement in the late 1850s, and became the location of both large holdings and small farms.

A large pastoral run was established along the length of the Capricorn Coast in 1865, extending from the Yeppoon area south towards what is now Emu Park.

European settlement in the Emu Park district began in the 1860s when John Jardine established a cattle grazing property to the south, at Zilzie. Emu Park township was established in the 1870s when several Rockhampton families built seaside holiday houses on the hills overlooking the two beaches that are a feature of the town. The first road to the district was established at this time, and small farms were set up along it. This road was the only access to the district until 1888, when the railway arrived.

The first bridge across the Fitzroy River was opened in 1881, replacing a steam ferry and increasing road usage to Emu Park.

== Current usage ==
The first 10.2 kilometres (6.3 mi) from Berserker is used by road trains carrying cattle to the Rockhampton abattoirs. In conjunction with Rockhampton-Yeppoon Road and the Scenic Highway, it is a popular tourist drive.

== Keppel Sands Road ==
Keppel Sands Road
- Location: Rockhampton–Emu Park Road, Tungamull to Schofield Parade, Keppel Sands
- Length: 14.1 km (8.8 mi)

Keppel Sands Road is a state-controlled district road (number 193) rated as a local road of regional significance (LRRS). It runs from Rockhampton–Emu Park Road in Tungamull to Schofield Parade in Keppel Sands, a distance of 14.1 kilometres (8.8 mi). This road has no major intersections.

== Major intersections ==
All distances are from Google Maps.

| LGA | Location | km | mi | Destinations | Notes |
|---|---|---|---|---|---|
| Rockhampton | Berserker | 0 | 0.0 | Rockhampton–Yeppoon Road (Queen Elizabeth Drive) – north-east – Park Avenue, Norman Gardens; Toft Street – south-west – Rockhampton CBD; Glenmore Road – north-west – Park Avenue | South-western end of Rockhampton–Emu Park Road. Road runs south-east as Bridge Street. |
| Livingstone | Tungamull | 24.9– 25.0 | 15.5– 15.5 | Keppel Sands Road – south-east – Keppel Sands; Cawarral Road – north – Cawarral | Road continues north-east. |
| Livingstone | Coorooman | 33.6 | 20.9 | Coorooman Creek Road – north-west – Cawarral | Road continues north-east. |
| Livingstone | Coorooman / Tanby midpoint | 35.9 | 22.3 | Tanby Road – north – Tanby | Road turns south-east. |
| Livingstone | Emu Park | 44.1 | 27.4 | Scenic Highway – north-west – Kinka Beach, Yeppoon; Hill Street – north-east – Emu Park jetty Pattison Street – south-east – Emu Park main beach | North-eastern end of Rockhampton–Emu Park Road. |
1.000 mi = 1.609 km; 1.000 km = 0.621 mi

== See also ==
- List of road routes in Queensland
- List of numbered roads in Queensland
- List of tourist drives in Queensland
