= Mount Chalmers, Queensland =

Mount Chalmers
- Town
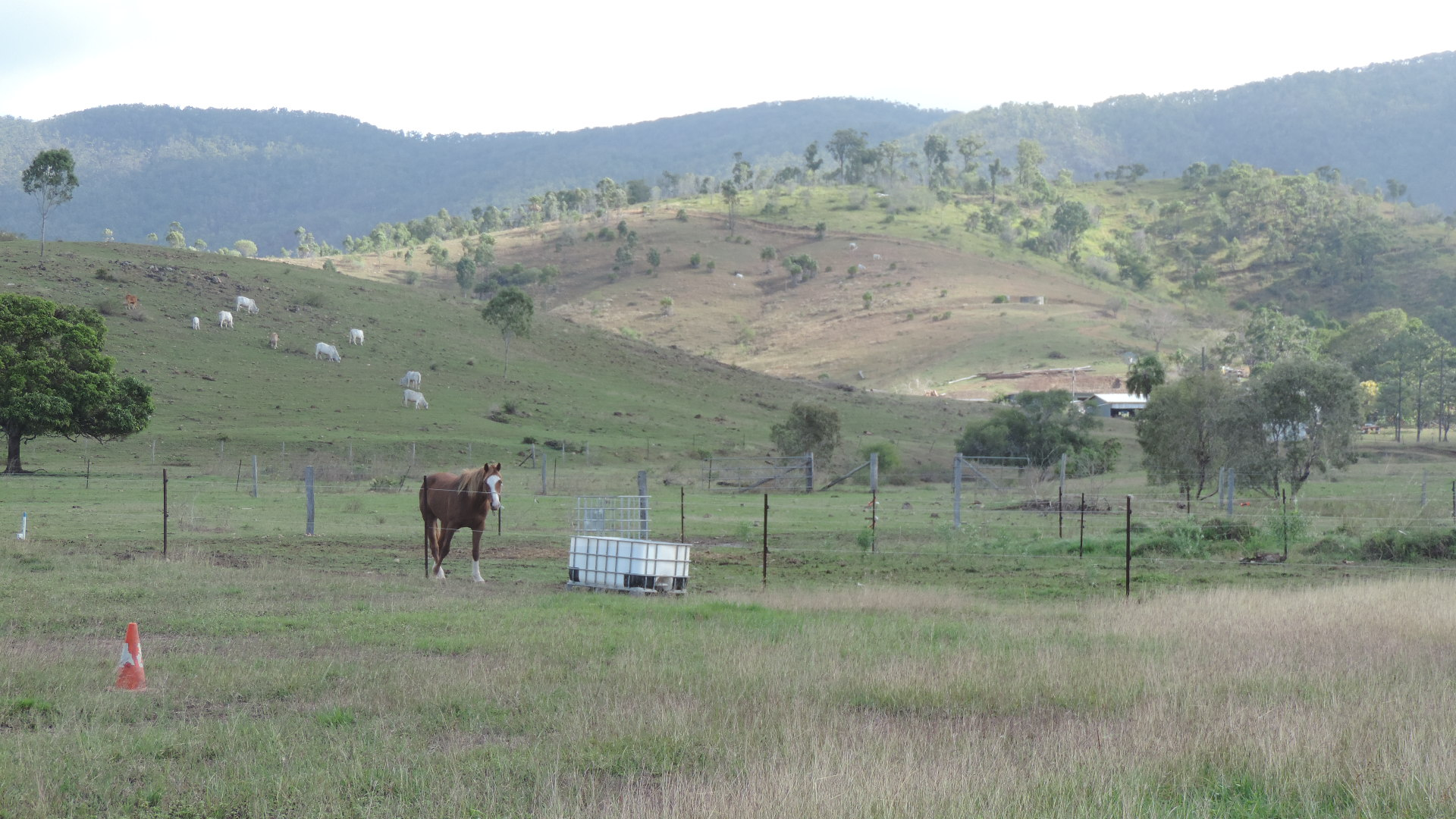
- Rural landscape, Mount Chalmers, 2016

- Interactive map of Mount Chalmers
- Coordinates: 23.2975°S 150.6402°E
- Country: Australia
- State: Queensland
- LGA: Shire of Livingstone
- Location: 29.45 km (18.30 mi) SW of Yeppoon; 30.0 km (18.6 mi) NE of Frenchville; 32.6 km (20.3 mi) NE of Rockhampton; 652 km (405 mi) NNW of Brisbane

Government
  - State electorate: Keppel
  - Federal division: Capricornia

Area
  - Total: 34.8 km^{2} (13.4 sq mi)

Population
  - Total: 226 (2021 census)
  - Density: 6.494/km^{2} (16.82/sq mi)
- Time zone: UTC+10:00 (AEST)
- Postcode: 4702
Localities around Mount Chalmers
Ironpot	Cawarral	Cawarral
Mount Archer	Mount Chalmers	Tungamull
Mount Archer	Nankin	Nankin

Mount Chalmers is a rural town and locality in the Livingstone Shire, Queensland, Australia. In the 2021 census, the locality of Mount Chalmers had a population of 226 people.

== Geography ==
The town of Mount Chalmers is in the north of the locality with Mount Nicholson being a neighbourhood within the south of the locality (23.3166°S 150.65°E).

The locality contains the following named peaks:

- Cabbage Tree Hill (23.3037°S 150.6088°E) 543 metres (1,781 ft)
- Mount Chalmers (23.3029°S 150.65698°E) 146 metres (479 ft)
- Mount Standish (23.3197°S 150.6162°E) 423 metres (1,388 ft)

Mount Chalmers lies approximately 25 kilometres north-east of Rockhampton.

== History ==
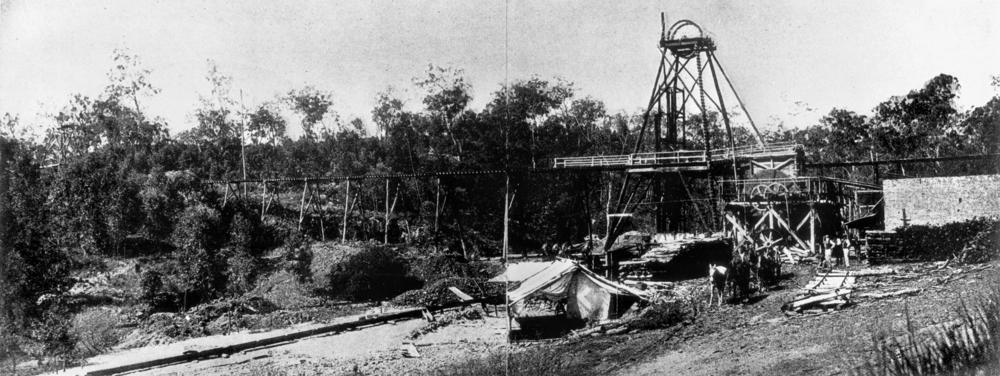
Fitzroy Copper Mine, Mount Chalmers, 1907

Gold was found in Mount Chalmers in 1860 but gold mining did not commence in the area until 1869. It was named after Mr Chambers who established a battery. In 1899 copper mining commenced.

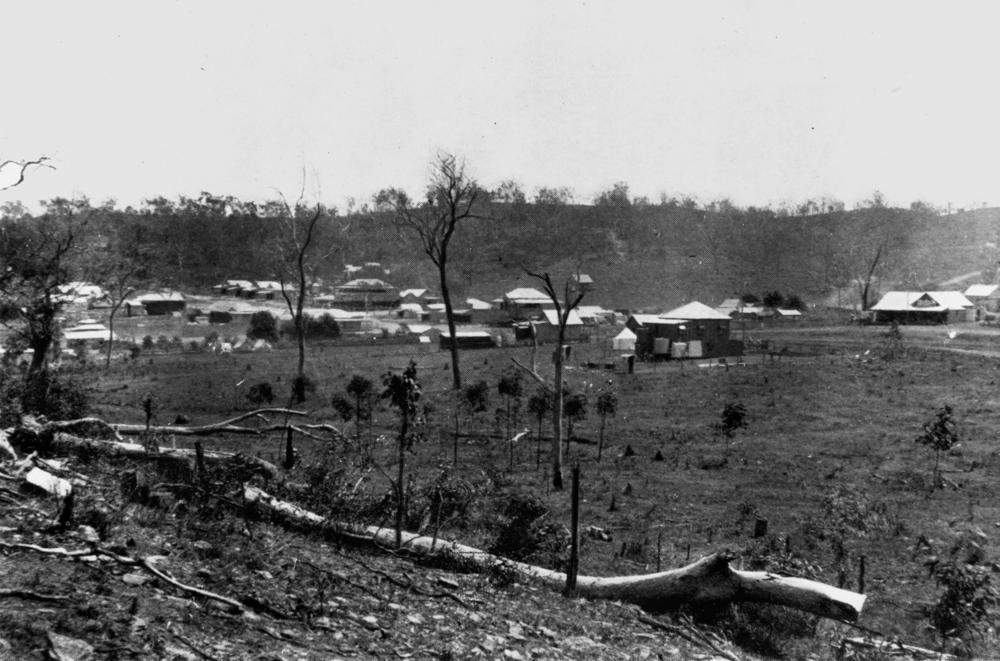
Panoramic view of Mount Chalmers, circa 1909

Mount Chalmers Provisional School opened on 23 January 1901. On 1 January 1909 it became Mount Chalmers State School. The school was mothballed on 31 December 2005 and its closure finalised on 31 December 2006. In 2014 the Livingstone Shire Council purchased the site for $230,000 for use by the local community. It is located at 16 School Street (23.2989°S 150.6409°E).

In 1908, the Yeppoon railway line was established from Sleipners Junction on the North Rockhampton to Emu Park railway line and then through to Yeppoon railway station. Mount Chalmers railway station (23°18′04″S 150°38′28″E) served the town, and Mount Nicholson railway station (23.3175°S 150.6440°E) served the south of the locality.

In 1911, the census recorded a population of 1,181.

The Sisters of St Joseph of the Sacred Heart opened St Joseph's Catholic primary school in 1913. It closed in 1914.

Mining ended in 1914 and people moved away; the 1921 census showed the population had fallen to 95 people.

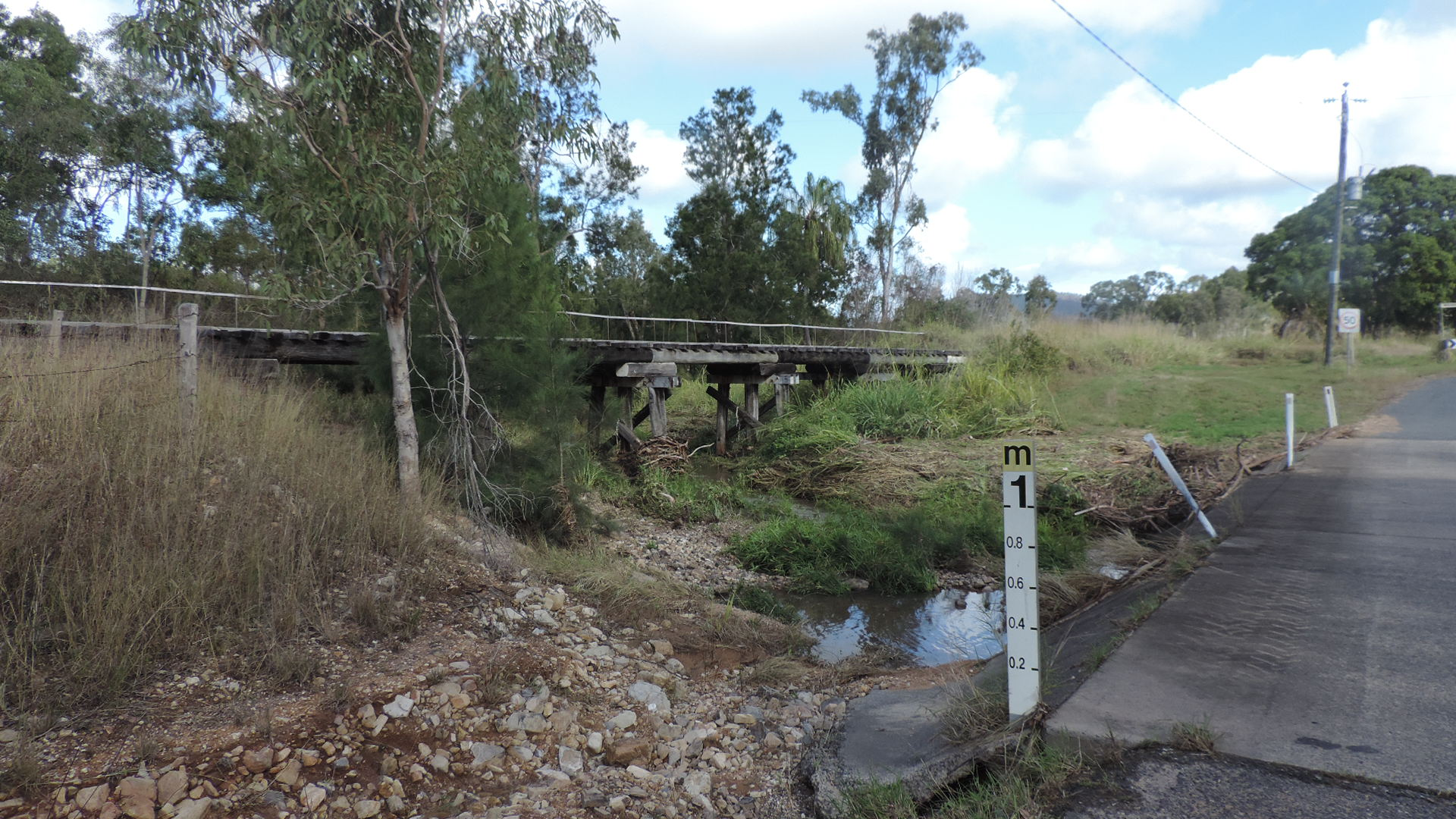
Railway bridge on the Yeppoon railway line, Mount Chalmers, 2016

The Yeppoon railway line ceased passenger services in 1978 and closed completely in 2004.

In January 2023, Carinity Education Rockhampton opened a campus in Mount Chalmers in former Mount Chalmers State School to provide special education services.

== Mining ==
Mount Chalmers developed as a mining settlement in the late 19th century following the discovery of copper and gold in the area. The Mount Chalmers mine was worked intermittently between 1899 and 1982, producing approximately 1.2 million tonnes of ore at average grades of 2.0% copper, 3.6 grams per tonne gold, and 19 grams per tonne silver.

The mine was originally operated by the Mount Chalmers Copper Mining Company in the early 1900s, later passing through a number of owners including Mount Morgan Limited and other operators during the mid-20th century. Mining ceased in 1982 when operations were closed due to falling metal prices and depletion of easily accessible ore.

The site has since attracted renewed interest from exploration companies. In the 2000s, Ausmelt Limited and Polymetals Mining undertook studies of the remaining resource. Since 2021, QMines Limited (ASX:QML) has held 100% ownership of the project and has reported updated resource estimates and feasibility studies as part of its evaluation of recommencing mining.

== Demographics ==
In the 2011 census, Mount Chalmers had a population of 216 people.

In the 2016 census, the population had increased to 235 people.

In the 2021 census, the population remained steady at 235 people.

== Education ==
Carinity Education Rockhampton is a special secondary co-educational school (Years 7 to 9) at 18 School Street (23.29844°S 150.64081°E). It is operated by the Baptist Union of Queensland and provides education for children who are not succeeding in a mainstream school by providing individualised support in a Christian setting. Students will then transfer to the school's Glenlee campus for later years of schooling. In 2023, the Mount Chalmers campus had 40 students.

There are no government schools in Mount Chalmers. The nearest government primary school is Cawarral State School in neighbouring Cawaral to the north-east. The nearest government secondary schools are North Rockhampton State High School in Frenchville, Rockhampton, to the south-west and Yeppoon State High School in Yeppoon to the north-east.

== Amenities ==
The Mount Chalmers Community History Centre operates from the old school site. The old school also has a library run by volunteers and supported by the Livingstone Shire Council.

== See also ==
- Mining in Australia
