= Tungamull =

- Suburb
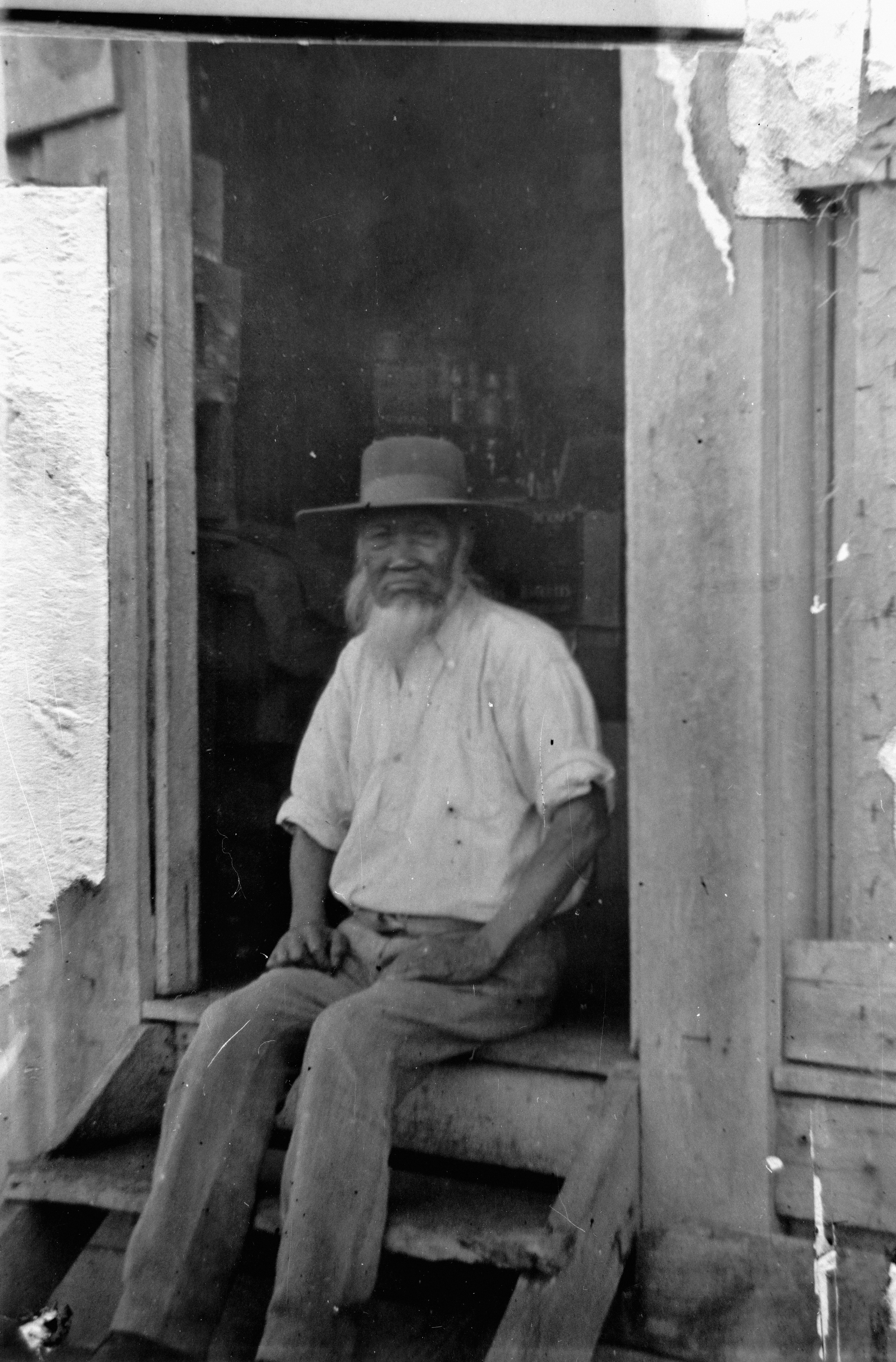
- Daniel Hawke, Tungamull storekeeper, circa 1920

- Interactive map of Tungamull
- Coordinates: 23.3325°S 150.6969°E
- Country: Australia
- State: Queensland
- LGA: Livingstone Shire
- Location: 18.6 km (11.6 mi) SW of Emu Park; 24.5 km (15.2 mi) WSW of Yeppoon; 26.7 km (16.6 mi) NE of Rockhampton CBD; 665 km (413 mi) NNW of Brisbane

Government
  - State electorate: Keppel
  - Federal division: Capricornia

Area
  - Total: 55.2 km^{2} (21.3 sq mi)

Population
  - Total: 429 (2021 census)
  - Density: 7.772/km^{2} (20.13/sq mi)
- Time zone: UTC+10:00 (AEST)
- Postcode: 4702
Suburbs around Tungamull
Mount Chalmers	Cawarral	Coowonga
Mount Chalmers	Tungamull	Coowonga
Nankin	Nankin	Joskeleigh

Tungamull is a rural locality in the Livingstone Shire, Queensland, Australia. In the 2021 census, Tungamull had a population of 429 people.

== Geography ==
The north of the locality has rural residential properties with some other pockets of rural residential properties in the south-east of the locality. Most of the locality is used for grazing on native vegetation.

The Rockhampton–Emu Park Road runs through from south to north.

== Demographics ==
In the 2016 census, Tungamull had a population of 443 people.

In the 2021 census, Tungamull had a population of 429 people.

== Education ==
There are no schools in Tungamull. The nearest government primary schools are Cawarral State School in neighbouring Cawarral to the north, Coowonga State School in neighbouring Coowonga to the north-east, and Keppel Sands State School in Keppel Sands to the east. The nearest government secondary schools are Yeppoon State High School in Yeppoon to the north and North Rockhampton State High School in Frenchville, Rockhampton, to the west.
