= Thompson Point =

Thompson Point or Thompson's Point may refer to:

- Thompson Point (Antarctica)
- Thompson Point, Queensland, a locality in the Rockhampton Region, Queensland, Australia
- Thompson's Point, Maine, a promontory in Portland, Maine, United States
