= Yeppoon railway station =

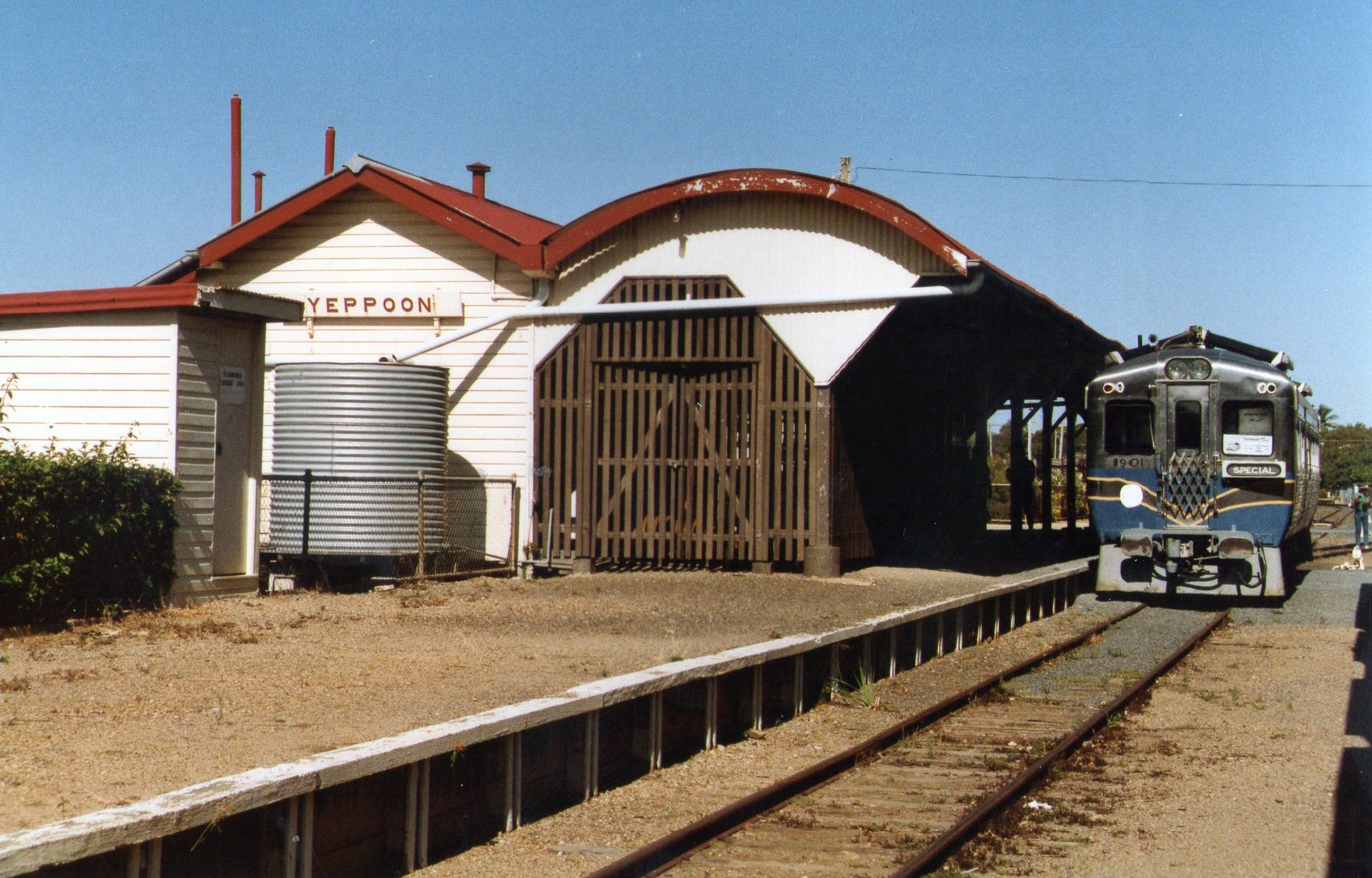
- Yeppoon Station, circa 1991

- Location within Queensland Location within Australia
- 23.1283°S 150.7429°E
- Location: James Street, Yeppoon, Shire of Livingstone, Queensland, Australia

Queensland Heritage Register
- Official name: Yeppoon Station Building
- Type: state heritage (built)
- Designated: 18 April 2008
- Reference no.: 602563
- Significant period: 1900s

Yeppoon railway station is a heritage-listed railway station at James Street, Yeppoon, Shire of Livingstone, Queensland, Australia. It was added to the Queensland Heritage Register on 18 April 2008.

== History ==
In 1867, residents of Rockhampton signed a petition asking the Surveyor-General to mark out a town at the nearest point on the central Queensland coast where they might be able to enjoy a day at the beach. Although Yeppoon, then known as "Bald Hills", was proclaimed as a Town Reserve, as a watering place for Rockhampton on 30 April 1868, for many years access to it was difficult, the first road with culverts being built in 1878. It suffered in its rivalry with Emu Park (declared a Town Reserve on 9 January 1869), where land was taken up by influential Rockhampton businessmen and squatters from further west who built holiday houses there. These two resort towns were among the first in Queensland and the first on the Great Barrier Reef lagoon.

Pastoralists and selectors were the first to settle and develop the Yeppoon area. The first land sale was held on 4 August 1873 when P. F. McDonald, the pastoralist and investor bought 15 of the 17 blocks sold, and local selectors two. Yeppoon town site lay in a hollow between steep hills, below the line of dunes, and in wet weather it was swampy. The only large enterprise was the Yeppoon Sugar Plantation, which in its twenty years of existence was handicapped by the lack of roads and rail. Yeppoon with a higher rainfall than Rockhampton or Emu Park, and fertile soil, became an agricultural area with land near the town occupied by selectors within 10 years of its proclamation and surrounding areas being used for grazing.

The beginning of the 1880s brought changes to the district as people began to take more of an interest in the town. Between 1881 and 1884, it was predominantly residents of the area who purchased the remaining 30 town lots. These lots had not sold at the first land sales in 1873. When an additional town area was surveyed in 1881, however, these lots had all sold out by 1885.

The first length of rail line in the region was opened to Westwood some thirty miles (fifty kilometres) from Rockhampton in 1867. The line was extended beyond the coastal ranges in 1872, reaching Emerald in 1879. The Central Western railway was progressively extended further west reaching Longreach in 1892, and remained an isolated railway system, with no connection to railways in southern Queensland railways until 1903 when the North Coast railway line connected them.

In Brisbane a railway line to Sandgate was completed in May 1882, later extended to Shorncliffe, giving residents access to the beach. It is one of the few surviving seaside stations; others including Pialba, Urangan, Cleveland, Southport, Tweed Heads and Coolangatta have been demolished.

Following this southern success, the Rockhampton owners of holiday houses at Emu Park also wanted a railway. Their petitions were successful and a railway line was constructed from North Rockhampton railway station to Emu Park was approved in 1885 and opened in December 1888. Because of the cost of building a railway bridge across the Fitzroy River, the railway to Emu Park commenced at North Rockhampton and did not extend to the main Rockhampton railway station; thus it too was a disconnected railway line. In addition to seaside passengers, the railway also served the Lakes Creek Meatworks and gold mining at Cawarral and New Zealand Gully. It ensured that Emu Park gained the holiday traffic, and the township grew rapidly. In 1899, the Rockhampton Junction railway line would connect the Emu Park railway line to the Archer Park railway station (now the Archer Park Rail Museum) on the south side of the Fitzroy River via the Alexandra Railway Bridge.

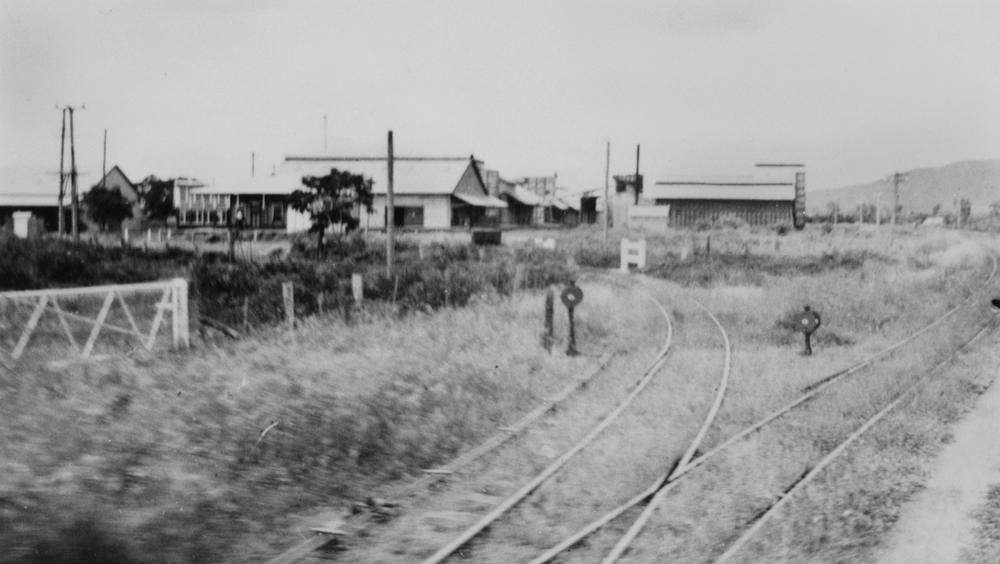
Railway tracks at Yeppoon, circa 1938

Yeppoon residents and the Sugar Plantation agitated for an extension to Yeppoon, for without it rail travellers continued to take the train to Tanby, then coach to Yeppoon. In 1890 a survey for a rail corridor to Yeppoon was undertaken and a second in 1900. The extension to Yeppoon was approved, and the first section of five kilometres from Sleipner (New Zealand Gully) to Mount Chalmers was opened in November 1908 to transport workers, supplies and metal. The next 27 kilometres (17 mi) to Yeppoon was opened on 20 December 1909, in time for the Christmas traffic. The official opening was by the Queensland Governor, Sir William MacGregor on 21 January 1910.

The passenger station, engine shed and a carriage shed were built in 1909. A parcels and luggage room were added in 1910. By 1943 the complex included a goods shed, station master's house, guards' quarters, drivers' quarters, forkline and loading ramp. The goods shed was relocated within the railyard in 1966.

Tourist services to Yeppoon and Emu Park departed from the passenger-only Archer Park railway station in Rockhampton. Also serving other passenger services to Mount Morgan, St Lawrence and Mackay, the station closed in February 1970.

On the first Rockhampton-Yeppoon train 128 passengers travelled, paying three shillings and ten pence for a second-class fare. On Boxing Day 1910, 700 people attended the traditional races on Yeppoon Beach. Large group picnics brought full trains to Yeppoon on weekends. An exceptionally large one was a Railway workers' picnic on the beach in 1924 which 3,500 people attended. The railway with fares much cheaper than the coach, opened Yeppoon to all classes and brought rapid progress. Betty Cosgrove has written: "very few working class people went to Yeppoon until the 20th century", but it became more popular than Emu Park with an ambience more tolerant and welcoming. The train to Yeppoon became the predominant means of travel to Yeppoon until after World War 2.

The siting of Yeppoon railway station one kilometre from the beach was not for the convenience of holiday makers, but for freight handling. On flat land on the edge of the town it allowed the loading of produce including cattle which could be yarded on the western end of the complex. Its position did not deter residents and visitors from "meeting the train", a practice continued from that of meeting the coach from Rockhampton. Passengers were the interest, and people "dressed" for the train's arrival.

Pineapples became a major crop in the district and the main freight carried. In 1953 a cannery opened at Koongal, Rockhampton, to which pineapples were railed. When it closed pineapples were railed to the cannery at Northgate in wagons adapted for bulk transport.

Boarding schools for girls were opened in Yeppoon in 1917 and 1923, allowing families on the Central Western railway line to send their daughters direct to Yeppoon. During the most fearful period of World War 2, when a Japanese invasion seemed imminent, St Faiths School was evacuated to Barcaldine in February 1942, with girls, beds, desks, pianos and boxes of books sent west by rail. The boarders from St Ursula's college were similarly evacuated to Our Ladies' College at Longreach.

With approximately 70,000 American troops in the Rockhampton district, troop movements within the district were by road, but soldiers on leave patronised the train. On Sunday 20 September 1942 all seaside trains out of Rockhampton were cancelled, as lines and rolling stock had to be available for transport of the troops who were then moving out to New Guinea. The camp sites were quiet until March 1943.

Peak passenger numbers were in 1950 with 40,083 passengers. After World War 2 car ownership became widespread, the Rockhampton-Yeppoon road improved and passenger travel on the railway fell. In 1964 the service to Emu Park closed and the station building has been demolished. Also in 1964 the weekday service to Yeppoon was provided by rail car and passenger services withdrawn in the 1970s. Up until the 1970s the lack of an all weather sealed road over the Drummond Range to ensured that the railway line remained the best method of holiday transport from the west to Yeppoon which had gained the unofficial title of "rouseabout's Bondi". The line has been used sporadically for freight or tourist services since. Occasional special heritage trips were made in the early 1980s.

In 2004, Queensland Rail announced that pineapple traffic would be put onto road transport and the Yeppoon line would be closed and dismantled. Investigation found that a possible commuter/tourist service would not be viable. By mid 2007 work had commenced on removing rails, sleepers, signals and other infrastructure.

In March 2022, the Livingstone Shire Council announced it would be building an outdoor undercover area with landscaping and parkingin the railway precinct. It would be used as both a community recovery hub during disasters, and otherwise be available for markets, entertainment, and other community events. The proposed development does not involve the re-use of the railway station buildings.

== Description ==
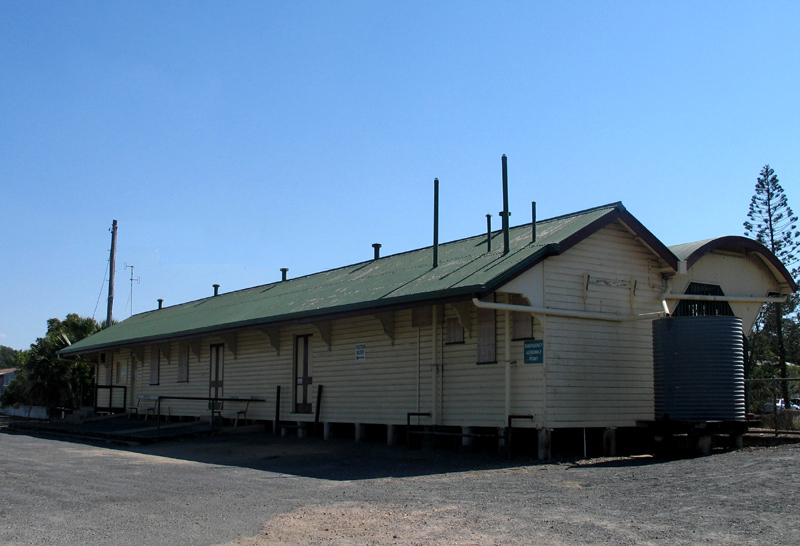
Yeppoon railway station, 2011

The station complex is located on the northern side of James Street at the western end of the main commercial precinct.

The passenger station is a long gable-roofed chamferboard building with a corrugated galvanised iron roof with square "fascia" gutters. On the street side, the roof extends to form a shade supported on timber posts by solid timber brackets. Large decorative brackets are spaced at regular intervals under the eaves. The lowset building is set on concrete stumps. Concrete steps lead up to doorways, a small timber landing is situated adjacent to a boarded up window of the ticket and freight office. Several metres from the building, two long sandstone block steps, topped with concrete run along half the length (western end) of the building. Some panelled doors remain, but the door to the ticket and freight office has been replaced with a flush sliding door. Windows are 4-pane colonial sash. The platform side has a curved shade supported on timber posts with plain struts and concrete bases. A section on the eastern end is enclosed with battens to form a storage area for a forklift. The platform on which the station building sits is concrete edged and is of compacted soil topped with blue metal gravel and is furnished with a single timber bench seat bearing the word "YEPPOON" in black letters. Two similar seats are placed on the street side of the building. On either end of the building a timber sign is mounted off the wall at an angle, painted dark green and with raised letters painted beige to match the building bearing the name "YEPPOON".

The ticket and freight office, located at the western end of the building is a large rectangular space with walls and ceiling lined with tongue and groove boards. A set of cupboards is built into the western end of the room to waist height. It has four doors and a safe located in the centre, below the window to the waiting room. Wall- mounted timber shelving is located to the right of the window. The room contains a mix of modern and original furnishings and fixtures. Two panelled timber doors with square fanlights above open to the platform. Two windows open to the platform and two to the street side.

The former waiting room is adjacent to the ticket and freight office and is enclosed to the platform side by timber battens with a door offset to the eastern end. It has a window opening to the ticket and freight office.

The parcels room is a large open space with centrally located double timber doors opening to the outside of the building on either side. The western wall is lined with four shelves. The roof and walls are lined with tongue and groove boards. The floor is of timber boards. The wall to the platform side has exposed framing.

At the eastern end of the building are male and female toilets with doors opening to the platform side.

== Heritage listing ==
Yeppoon Station Building was listed on the Queensland Heritage Register on 18 April 2008 having satisfied the following criteria.

The place is important in demonstrating the evolution or pattern of Queensland's history.

Yeppoon Railway Station is important in demonstrating the pattern of Queensland's history. The terminal of branch line opened in 1909, it is important surviving evidence of a rail service to a seaside resort. Passengers from Rockhampton and throughout Central West Queensland used the service to Yeppoon. The line also contributed to coastal development serving mining, agricultural, educational and pastoral interests in the area. In particular it was important in the establishment of Yeppoon as a centre for boarding schools to service Central Queensland. It recalls an era when the railway played an important role in conveying day trippers to the seaside and complements Archer Park (Archer Park Rail Museum), the principal point of departure for passengers on this railway.

The place demonstrates rare, uncommon or endangered aspects of Queensland's cultural heritage.

The Yeppoon station building is important as a rare surviving and substantially intact seaside resort station, comparing with Shorncliffe and Pialba and others including Urangan, Cleveland, Southport, Tweeds Heads and Coolangatta since demolished. The extant earth platform is also rare in Queensland.
