= Nerimbera =

- Suburb
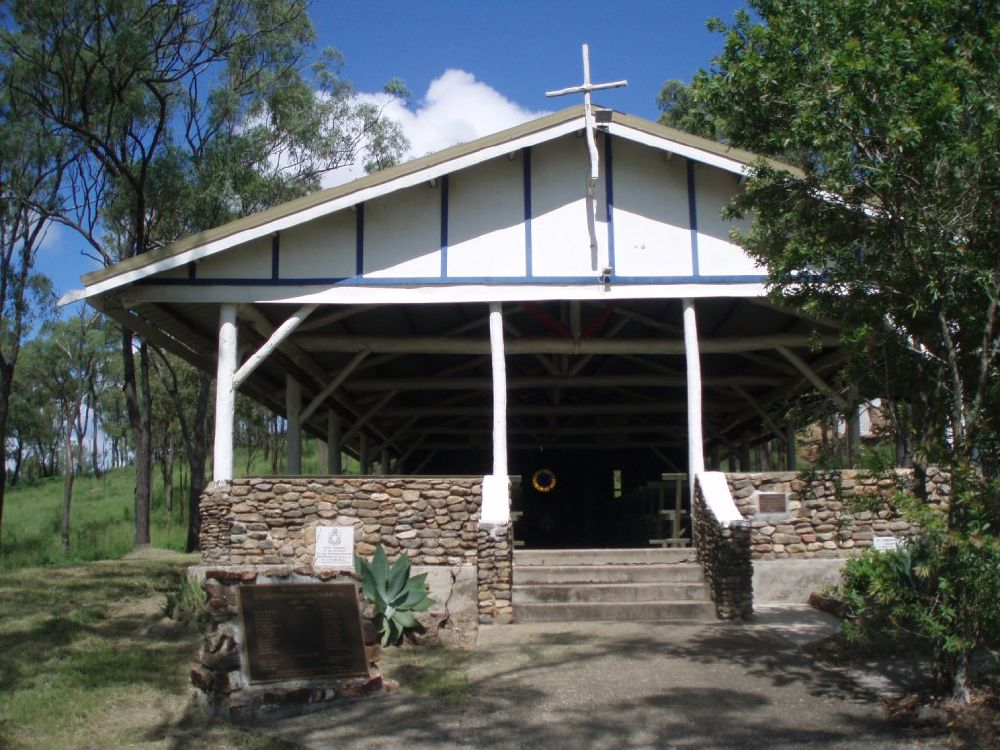
- St Christophers Chapel, 2009

- Interactive map of Nerimbera
- Coordinates: 23.4136°S 150.595°E
- Country: Australia
- State: Queensland
- LGA: Shire of Livingstone
- Location: 10.3 km (6.4 mi) SE of Frenchville; 11.4 km (7.1 mi) SE of Rockhampton CBD; 42.6 km (26.5 mi) SW of Yeppoon; 635 km (395 mi) NNW of Brisbane

Government
  - State electorate: Keppel
  - Federal division: Capricornia

Area
  - Total: 46.2 km^{2} (17.8 sq mi)

Population
  - Total: 285 (2021 census)
  - Density: 6.169/km^{2} (15.98/sq mi)
- Time zone: UTC+10:00 (AEST)
- Postcode: 4701
Suburbs around Nerimbera
Lakes Creek	Mount Archer	Nankin
Port Curtis	Nerimbera	Nankin
Midgee	Midgee	Nankin

Nerimbera is a rural locality in the Livingstone Shire, Queensland, Australia. In the 2021 census, Nerimbera had a population of 285 people.

== Geography ==
The northern part of Nerimbera comprises the Black Creek valley running up into the Berserker Range; this land is mountainous and undeveloped. Mount Berserker, also known as Mount Nerimbera (23.365°S 150.5844°E) is 468 metres (1,535 ft) above sea level.

The southern part of Nerimbera is bounded to the west by the Fitzroy River and is mostly flatter land (apart from some mountain spurs). Most of the land use in Nerimbera occurs in these low-lying flatter areas and is mostly used for grazing.

The Rockhampton–Emu Park Road runs through from west to east.

== History ==
The Berserker Range and Mount Berserker takes their name from the Norse Berserker warriors. The name was used in 1853 by pastoralist Charles Archer whose family lived in Scotland and Norway.

In 1911 a Baptist church opened in Nerimbera. A stump-capping ceremony was held on Saturday 19 August 1911. It opened on Sunday 1 October 1911.

Nerimbera State School opened on 16 August 1921. It was mothballed on 31 December 2008 and closed on 31 December 2009. The school was located at 4 Graff Road (corner Nerimbera School Road, 23.4006°S 150.5888°E).

== Demographics ==
In the 2012 census, Nerimbera had a population of 265 people.

In the 2016 census, Nerimbera had a population of 293 people.

In the 2021 census, Nerimbera had a population of 285 people.

== Heritage listings ==
Nerimbera has the following heritage listings:

- St Christophers Chapel Road: St Christophers Chapel

== Economy ==
Employing more than 500 staff, the JBS Meat Processing facility on St Christopher's Chapel Road has a daily processing capacity of 696 cattle. Holcim Australia operate an aggregate quarry at Arnold Drive.

== Education ==
There are no schools in Nerimbera. The nearest government primary school is Lakes Creek State School in neighbouring Lakes Creek to the north-west. The nearest government secondary school is North Rockhampton State High School in Frenchville to the north-west.
