= North Rockhampton to Emu Park railway line =

Australian branch line of the North Coast railway line

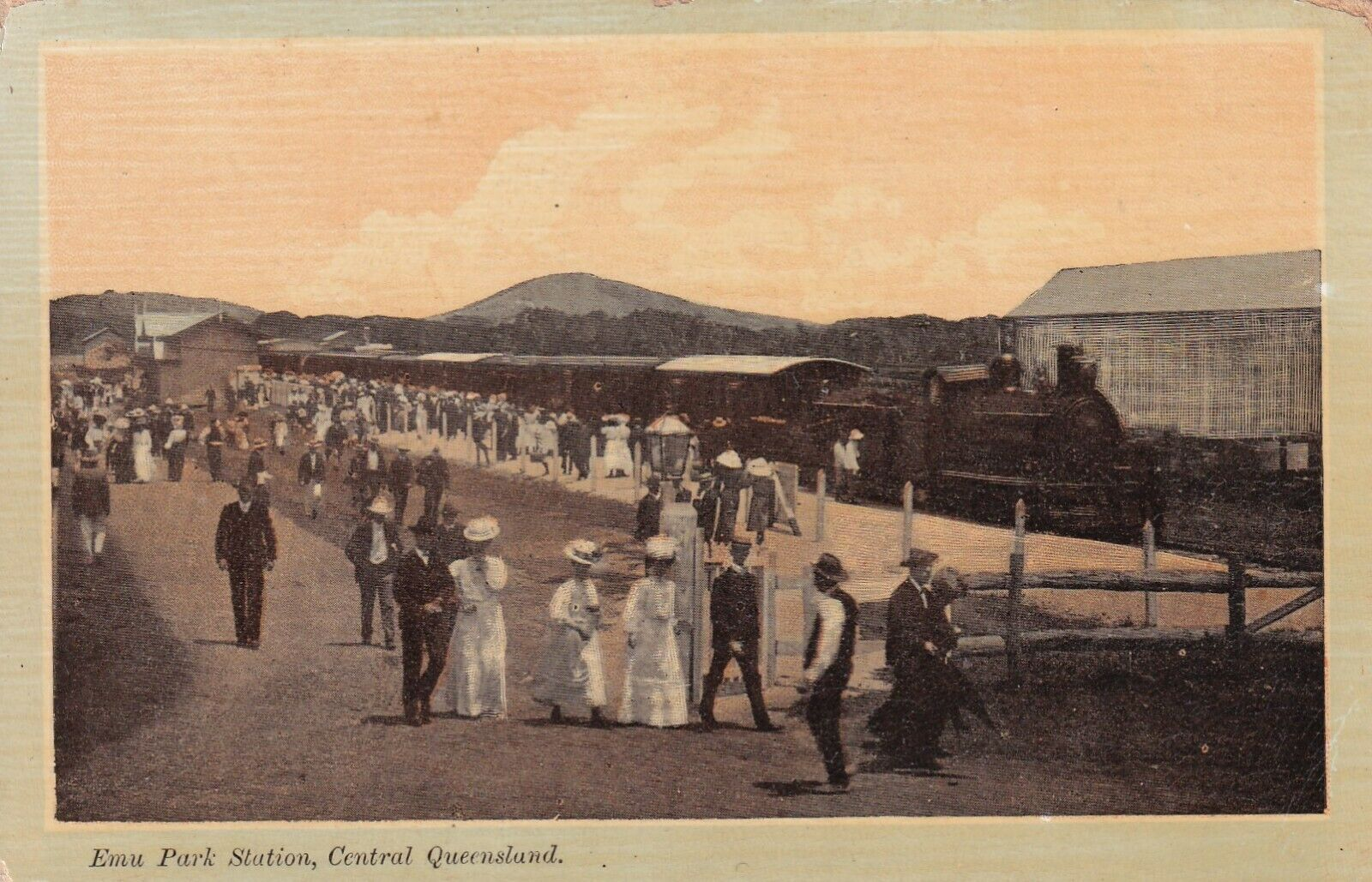
Passengers alight at the Emu Park railway station, circa 1908

The North Rockhampton to Emu Park railway line was a branch line of the North Coast railway line in Central Queensland. Australia. It connected Rockhampton to Emu Park (from the North Rockhampton railway station to Emu Park railway station).

== History ==
The railway line was officially opened on Saturday 22 December 1888 by Archibald Archer, the local member of the Queensland Legislative Assembly for Rockhampton.

The line was 47 kilometres (29 mi) long and provided access to the seaside for Rockhampton, with subsequent lines opening from Nankin Junction to Broadmount (24 km) in 1898 and Sleipner Junction via Mount Chalmers and Cawarral to Yeppoon railway station (32 km) in 1909.

The line cost £149,829 19s 7d.

The Broadmount line closed in 1929, being the first branch line closed by Queensland Rail. The Emu Park – Sleipner Junction section closed in 1964, and the Yeppoon line beyond Lakes Creek in about 2007. Suburban frequency (14/day) services were provided between Rockhampton and the abattoir at Lakes Creek for workers between 1913 and 1930.
