= Mount Archer, Queensland (Rockhampton Region) =

Suburb and mountain in Queensland, Australia

Mount Archer
- Suburb
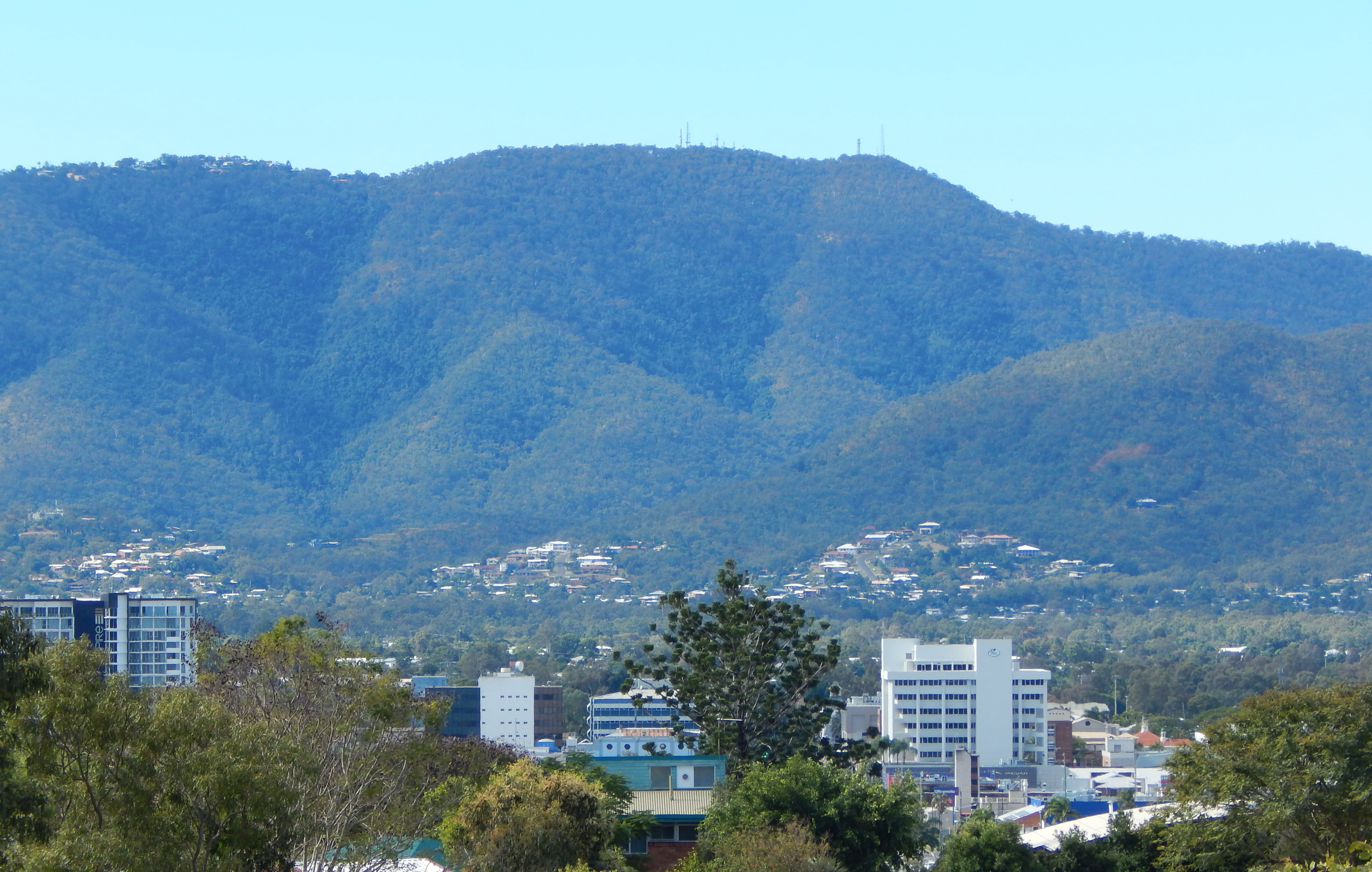
- Mount Archer, 2022

- Interactive map of Mount Archer
- Coordinates: 23.33°S 150.5802°E
- Country: Australia
- State: Queensland
- LGA: Rockhampton Region
- Location: 14.3 km (8.9 mi) NE of Rockhampton CBD; 644 km (400 mi) NNW of Brisbane

Government
  - State electorate: Keppel
  - Federal division: Capricornia

Area
  - Total: 23.6 km^{2} (9.1 sq mi)

Population
  - Total: 77 (2021 census)
  - Density: 3.263/km^{2} (8.45/sq mi)
- Time zone: UTC+10:00 (AEST)
- Postcode: 4701
Suburbs around Mount Archer
Limestone Creek	Limestone Creek	Limestone Creek
Norman Gardens	Mount Archer	Mount Chalmers
Frenchville	Lakes Creek; Nerimbera	Nankin

Mount Archer
- Location within Queensland

Highest point
- Elevation: 604 m (1,982 ft)
- Coordinates: 23°20′00″S 150°34′58″E

Geography
- Location: Queensland, Australia
- Parent range: Berserker Range

Climbing
- Easiest route: Road

Mount Archer is a suburb of Rockhampton and a mountain in the Rockhampton Region, Queensland, Australia. In the 2021 census, Mount Archer had a population of 77 people.

== Geography ==
The mountain is 604 metres (1,982 ft) high, and forms part of the Berserker Range. The Mount Archer National Park surrounds the mountain. Mount Archer is located within the boundaries of the city of Rockhampton. The summit is accessible by a sealed road, Pilbeam Drive, which leads to the upmarket small suburb of Mount Archer, located just below the summit. Lookouts and picnic areas are located on the summit of the mountain, as well as a number of communications towers.

== History ==
The mountain was named in 1859 by surveyor Clarendon Stuart after the Archer brothers who established a pastoral property at Gracemere in 1854.

== Demographics ==
In the 2016 census, Mount Archer had a population of 85 people.

In the 2021 census, Mount Archer had a population of 77 people.

== Education ==
There are no schools in Mount Archer. The nearest government primary school is Frenchville State School in neighbouring Frenchville to the south-west. The nearest government secondary school is North Rockhampton State High School, also in neighbouring Frenchville.

Despite the name, Mount Archer State School is not located on the mountain, but in the suburb of Koongal.

== See also ==
- List of mountains in Australia
