= Midgee, Queensland =

Midgee
- Suburb
- Interactive map of Midgee
- Coordinates: 23.4994°S 150.5858°E
- Country: Australia
- State: Queensland
- LGA: Rockhampton Region
- Location: 16.9 km (10.5 mi) S of Rockhampton CBD; 622 km (386 mi) NNW of Brisbane

Government
  - State electorate: Mirani
  - Federal division: Flynn

Area
  - Total: 142.0 km^{2} (54.8 sq mi)

Population
  - Total: 90 (2021 census)
  - Density: 0.63/km^{2} (1.64/sq mi)
- Time zone: UTC+10:00 (AEST)
- Postcode: 4702
Suburbs around Midgee
Port Curtis	Nerimbera	Nankin
Bouldercombe	Midgee	Nankin
Bouldercombe	Bajool	Port Alma

Midgee is a rural locality in the Rockhampton Region, Queensland, Australia. In the 2021 census, Midgee had a population of 90 people.

== Geography ==
The locality is bounded to north-west by the Fitzroy River.

The Bruce Highway enters the locality from the south (Bajool) and exits to the north-west (Port Curtis).

The North Coast railway line also enters the locality from the south (Bajool) and exits to the north-west (Port Curtis), running immediately parallel and east of the highway, with the locality served by:

- Gavial railway station, now abandoned (23.4757°S 150.5385°E)
- Midgee railway station (23.5086°S 150.5507°E)

The land use is grazing on native vegetation.

== History ==
Midgee Provisional School opened on 21 January 1907 under head teacher Eliza Annie Thompson. On 1 January 1909, it became Midgee State School. It closed on 15 June 1942. It was at 48 Roope Road (23.50770°S 150.54905°E) beside the Midgee railway station.

== Demographics ==
In the 2016 census, Midgee had a population of 44 people.

In the 2021 census, Midgee had a population of 90 people.

== Education ==
There are no schools in Midgee. The nearest government primary schools are Port Curtis Road State School in neighbouring Port Curtis to the north-west, Bouldercombe State School in neighbouring Bouldercombe to the south-west, and Waraburra State School in Gracemere to the west. The nearest government secondary school is Rockhampton State High School in Wandal.
