= Joskeleigh, Queensland =

Joskeleigh
- Town
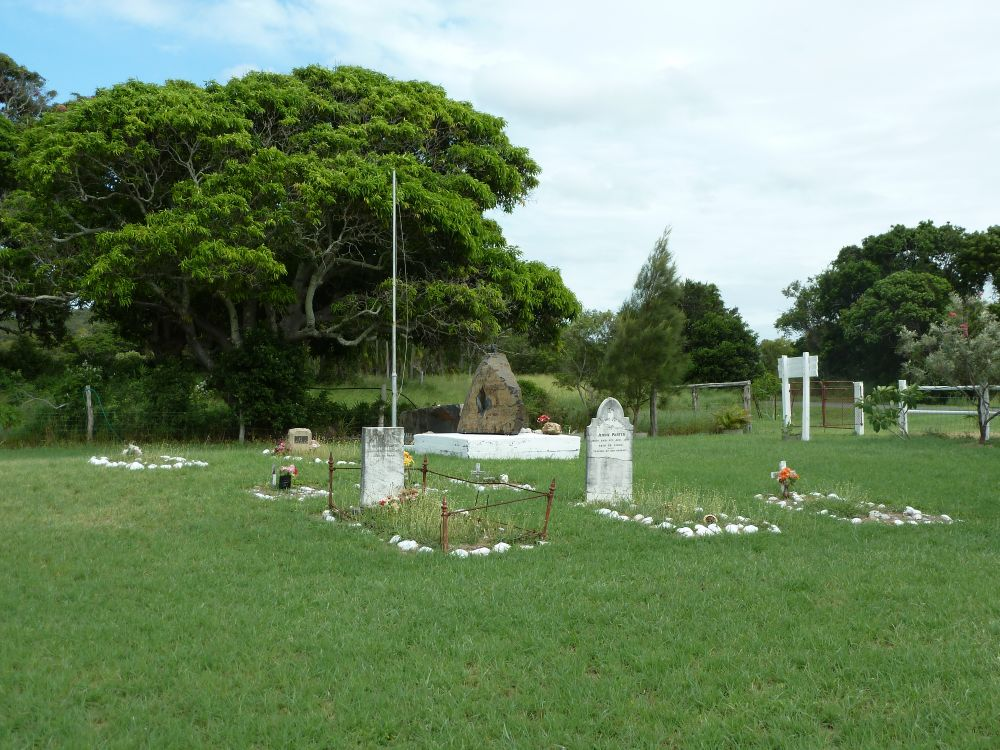
- Joskeleigh Cemetery, 2001

- Interactive map of Joskeleigh
- Coordinates: 23.3811°S 150.8°E
- Country: Australia
- State: Queensland
- LGA: Livingstone Shire
- Location: 34.9 km (21.7 mi) S of Yeppoon; 40.5 km (25.2 mi) E of Rockhampton CBD; 670 km (420 mi) NNW of Brisbane

Government
  - State electorate: Keppel
  - Federal division: Capricornia

Area
  - Total: 51.3 km^{2} (19.8 sq mi)

Population
  - Total: 60 (2021 census)
  - Density: 1.17/km^{2} (3.03/sq mi)
- Time zone: UTC+10:00 (AEST)
- Postcode: 4702
Localities around Joskeleigh
Coowonga	Keppel Sands	Coral Sea
Tungamull	Joskeleigh	Coral Sea
Nankin	Thompson Point	Coral Sea

Joskeleigh is a coastal rural locality in the Livingstone Shire, Queensland, Australia. In the 2021 census, the locality of Joskeleigh had a population of 60 people.

== Geography ==
The waters of the Coral Sea form the eastern boundary.

== History ==
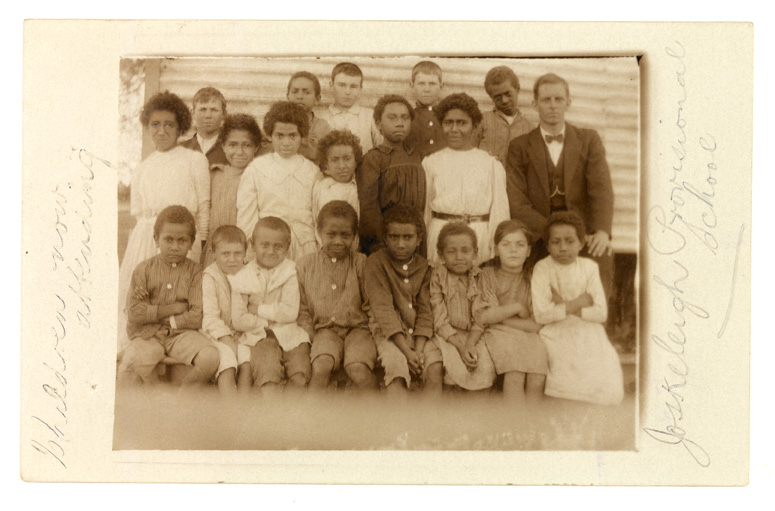
Children attending Joskeleigh Provisional School, circa 1915

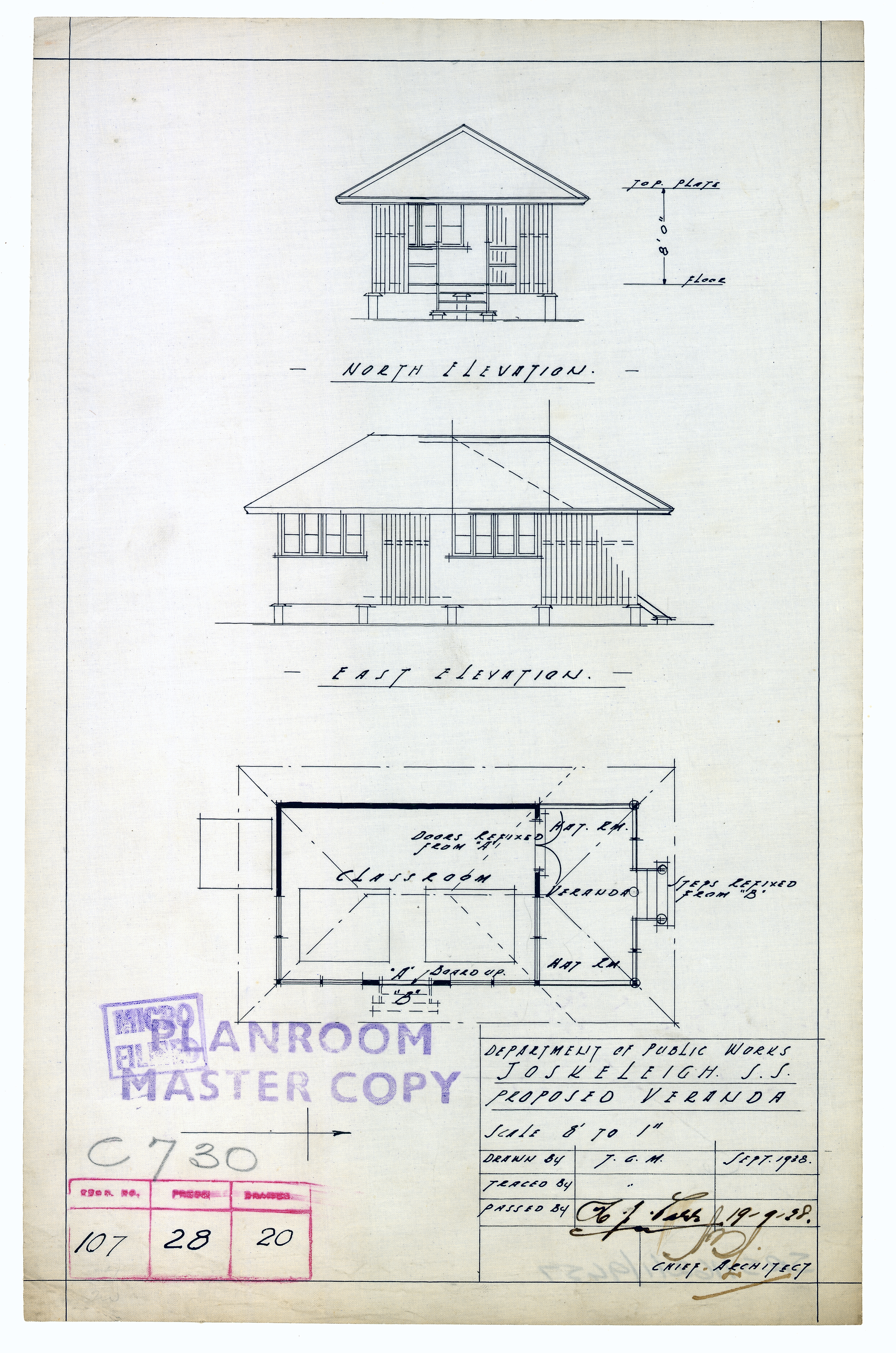
Architectural plan of Joskeleigh State School, Proposed Verandah, 19 September 1928

Joskeleigh which was home to a large South Sea Islander community, imported as indentured labourers from various islands in Melanesia and Polynesia in the 1890s.

Joskeleigh Provisional School opened on 28 October 1913 in a church building, pending the erection of a school building, under head teacher Frederick Vespermann. There was an average of 21 students in 1913. In 1915, a tender was accepted for the construction of an "open-air school" (a simple structure with canvas walls). In 1918, it became Joskeleigh State School. It closed on 29 April 1985 due to falling enrolments. It was at 356 Joskeleigh Road (23.3676°S 150.7829°E).

Sandhills Post Office opened on 24 December 1923 (a receiving office had been open from 1898, named Fishergate until 1908) and closed in 1937.

Joskeleigh Post Office opened on 1 September 1947 and closed in 1971.

Between 2008 and 2013, the locality was within the Rockhampton Region.

== Demographics ==
In the 2016 census, the locality of Joskeleigh had a population of 70 people.

In the 2021 census, the locality of Joskeleigh had a population of 60 people.

== Heritage listings ==
Joskeleigh has a number of heritage-listed sites, including:

- Joskeleigh Cemetery: Joskeleigh Road (23.3678°S 150.7791°E)

== Education ==
There are no schools in Joskeleigh. The nearest government primary school is Keppel Sands State School in neighbouring Keppel Sands to the north. The nearest government secondary school is Yeppoon State High School in Yeppoon to the north.

== Facilities ==
Joskeleigh Cemetery is an operational cemetery operated by the Livingstone Shire Council.
