= Coowonga, Queensland =

Coowonga
- Town
- Interactive map of Coowonga
- Coordinates: 23.3116°S 150.7247°E
- Country: Australia
- State: Queensland
- LGA: Shire of Livingstone
- Location: 14.9 km (9.3 mi) WSW of Emu Park; 20.8 km (12.9 mi) SSW of Yeppoon; 40.8 km (25.4 mi) NE of Rockhampton; 675 km (419 mi) NNW of Brisbane

Government
  - State electorate: Keppel
  - Federal division: Capricornia

Area
  - Total: 25.3 km^{2} (9.8 sq mi)

Population
  - Total: 255 (2021 census)
  - Density: 10.08/km^{2} (26.10/sq mi)
- Time zone: UTC+10:00 (AEST)
- Postcode: 4702
Localities around Coowonga
Cawarral	Coorooman	Coorooman
Tungamull	Coowonga	Keppel Sands
Tungamull	Tungamull	Joskeleigh

Coowonga is a rural locality in the Shire of Livingstone, Central Queensland, Australia. In the 2021 census, the locality of Coowonga had a population of 255 people.

== Geography ==
Coowonga is located in coastal hills at the southern end of the Capricorn Coast. It is six kilometres from the Pacific Ocean and the nearest township of Keppel Sands.

Much of the district south of Coowonga Road is grazing and fruit-growing land, while to the north lie tidal salt flats that back onto Coorooman Creek.

The Rockhampton–Emu Park Road runs through from west to north.

== History ==
Coowonga is the traditional land of the Darumbal Aboriginal tribe, as is all of the Capricornia region.

Coowonga Provision School opened on 9 August 1897. It became Coowonga State School on 1 January 1909.

Prior to local government amalgamations in 2008, the Capricorn Coast was administered by Livingstone Shire Council but became part of Rockhampton Region in 2008. In 2014, following a deamalgamation vote, the Shire of Livingstone was re-established.

== Demographics ==
In the 2006 census, the locality of Coowonga had a population of 558 people.

In the 2011 census, the locality of Coowonga had a population of 260 people.

In the 2016 census, the locality of Coowonga had a population of 254 people.

In the 2021 census, the locality of Coowonga had a population of 255 people.

== Economy ==
Coowonga is a rural community with a focus on primary production.

The Koorana Crocodile Farm, on the banks of Coorooman Creek, opened in November 1981 as the first commercial crocodile farm in Queensland. It also operates as a tourist attraction. At 2014, it had 3,000 crocodiles and supplies crocodile leather and crocodile meat.

== Education ==
Coowonga State School is a government primary (Prep-6) school for boys and girls at 269 Coowonga Road (23.3026°S 150.7311°E). In 2015, it had an enrolment of 19 students with 3 teachers (2 equivalent full-time). In 2018, the school had an enrolment of 17 students with 4 teachers (2 full-time equivalent) and 5 non-teaching staff (2 full-time equivalent).

There are no secondary schools in Coowonga. The nearest government secondary school is Yeppoon State High School in Yeppoon to the north.
