= Mount Archer National Park =

National park in Australia

- IUCN category II (national park)
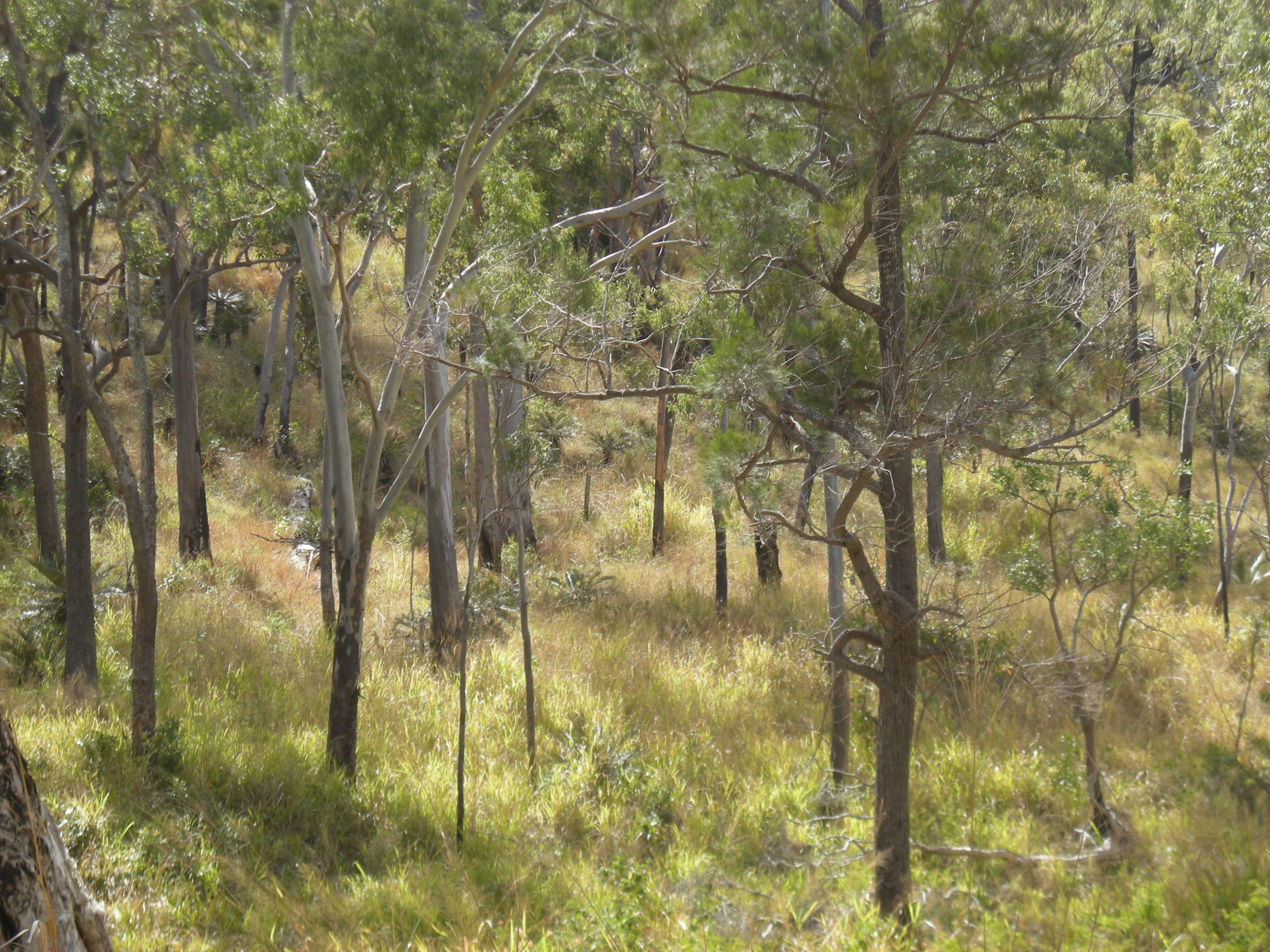
- Eucalypt woodland, Mount Archer National Park

- Location within Queensland
- Location: Queensland
- Nearest city: Rockhampton
- Coordinates: 23°19′31″S 150°34′55″E
- Area: 36.1 km^{2} (13.9 sq mi)
- Established: 1994
- Governing body: Queensland Parks and Wildlife Service
- Website: Official website

Mount Archer National Park is a national park in Central Queensland, Australia, 522 kilometres (324 mi) northwest of Brisbane. It makes up the backdrop to the city of Rockhampton which marks the start of Tropical Queensland.

It comprises 4,250 hectares (10,500 acres) of open forests and woodland and its highest peak is Mount Archer which stands at 604 m (1,982 ft) above sea level. The Darumbal tribe Raki-warra clan considers the park as a part of its traditional country. It was explored by the Archer brothers in 1853 and was later named after them. In 1898, the site of the park was set aside as a water reserve and a timber reserve in 1940. The grazing went on until 1985 and later the area came under the supervision of the Queensland Parks and Wildlife Service. It became an environmental park in 1987 and was declared a national park in 1994.

The vegetation is mostly open eucalypt woodland with patches of vine scrub. The rufous shrikethrush, white-browed scrubwren, powerful owl and glossy black cockatoo are some of the bird species found in the park.

A road leads to the summit of Mount Archer, where there are a few bushwalking and rock climbing opportunities.

== See also ==
- Protected areas of Queensland
