= Keppel Sands, Queensland =

Keppel Sands
- Town
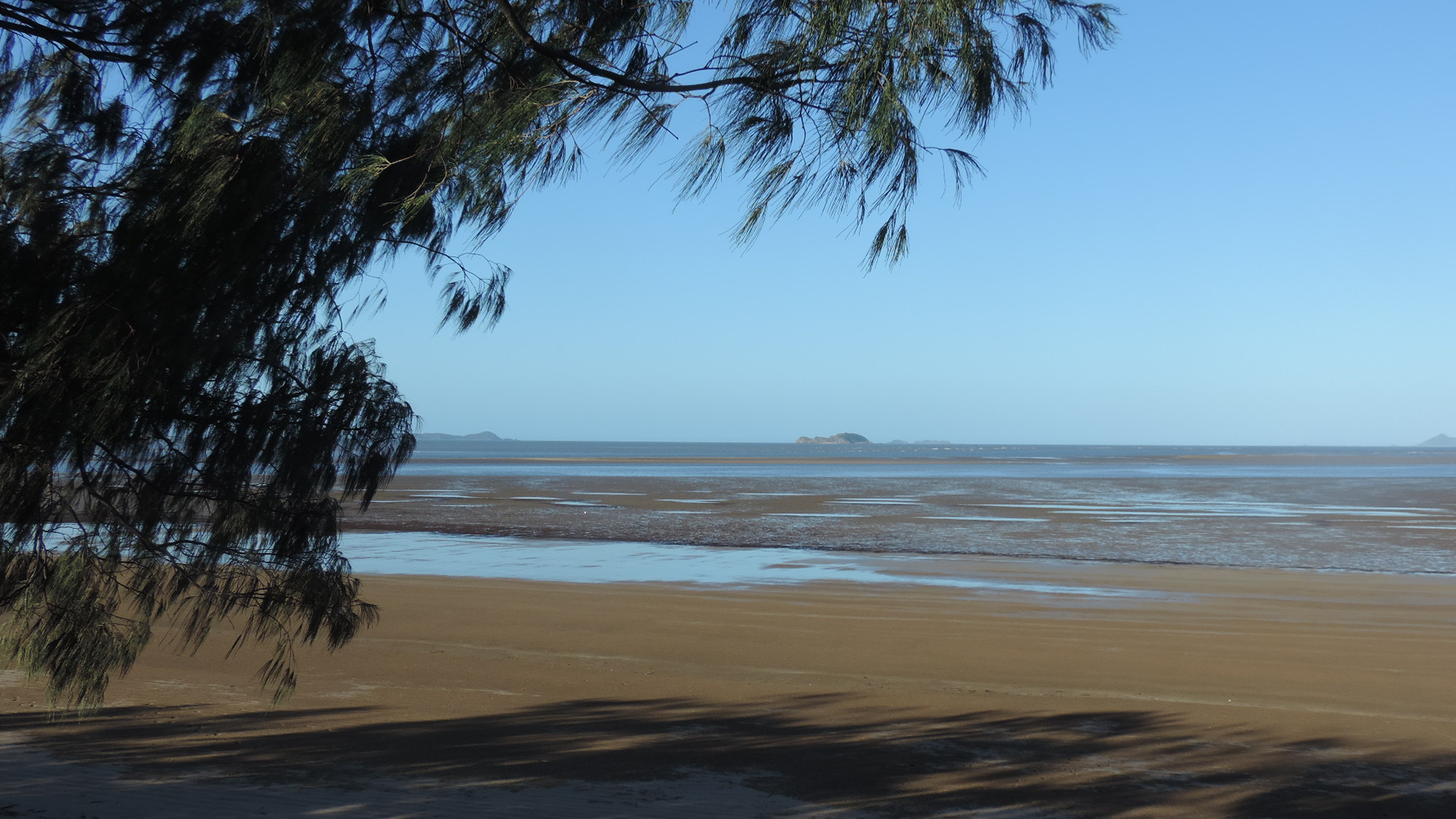
- Beach at Keppel Sands (low tide), 2016

- Interactive map of Keppel Sands
- Coordinates: 23.3297°S 150.7933°E
- Country: Australia
- State: Queensland
- LGA: Shire of Livingstone
- Location: 29.0 km (18.0 mi) SW of Emu Park; 34.9 km (21.7 mi) S of Yeppoon; 40.6 km (25.2 mi) ENE of Rockhampton; 670 km (420 mi) NNW of Brisbane

Government
  - State electorate: Keppel
  - Federal division: Capricornia

Area
  - Total: 34.3 km^{2} (13.2 sq mi)

Population
  - Total: 374 (2021 census)
  - Density: 10.904/km^{2} (28.24/sq mi)
- Time zone: UTC+10:00 (AEST)
- Postcode: 4702
Localities around Keppel Sands
Coorooman	Zilzie	The Keppels
Coowonga	Keppel Sands	The Keppels
Tungamull	Joskeleigh	Coral Sea

Keppel Sands is a coastal rural town and locality in the Livingstone Shire, Queensland, Australia. In the 2021 census, the locality of Keppel Sands had a population of 374 people.

== Geography ==
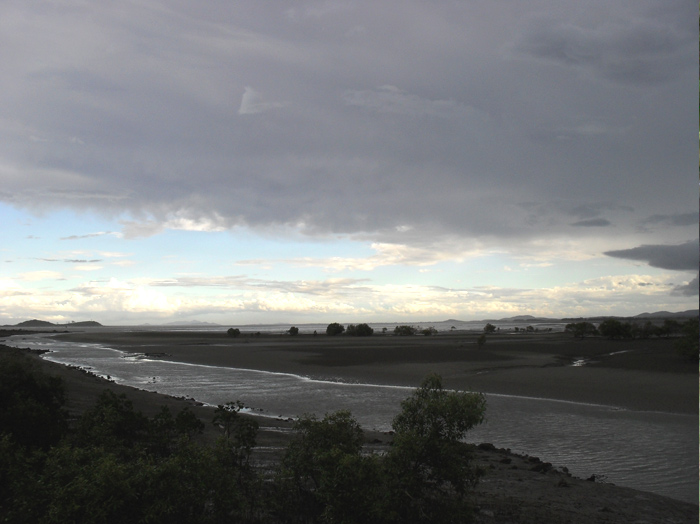
Pumpkin Creek

Keppel Sands is the southernmost town on the Capricorn Coast. The town is located on the north-eastern tip of the locality along the coast in the Livingstone Shire Council local government area, 670 kilometres (416 mi) north of the state capital, Brisbane. The mouth of Pumpkin Creek is the southern extent of the town (23.3367°S 150.7938°E).

Keppel Sands is separated by Carrawal Creek and its tributary Coorooman Creek from the larger towns of Emu Park and Yeppoon to the north. Road access is via Keppel Sands Road which enters the locality from the south-west (Tungamull).

Keppel Bay is offshore from Keppel Sands (23.389°S 150.897°E). Like other coastal localities in the Shire of Livingstone, the locality's boundary extends into Keppell Bay.

Girt Island is a 24.2-hectare (60-acre) offshore marine island (23.3569°S 150.8141°E) in the bay with the north of the island within the locality of Keppel Sands and the south of the island within Joskeleigh.

The Keppel Sands Conservation Park is in the north and centre of the locality (23.338°S 150.780°E). Apart from this protected area, the land use is residential within the town and predominantly grazing on native vegetation outside of the town.

Keppel Sands is home to many retirees who enjoy fishing and crabbing.

== History ==
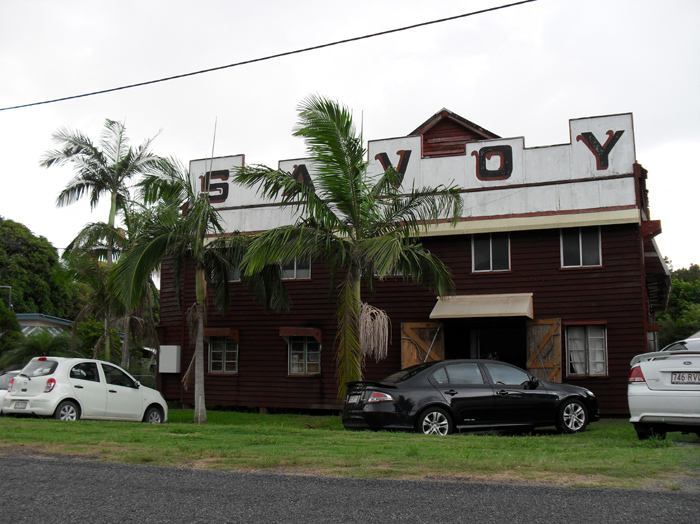
Savoy Theatre, 2011

Originally known as Sandhills, the town takes its current name from Keppel Bay, which in turn was named on 27 May 1770 by Lieutenant James Cook, commander of HMS Endeavour, after Admiral Augustus Keppel, the First Lord of the Admiralty.

The Savoy Theatre was built in 1947 by Roy Savage. It was used as a cinema and for dances. It closed in 1961. It could accommodate up to 600 people.

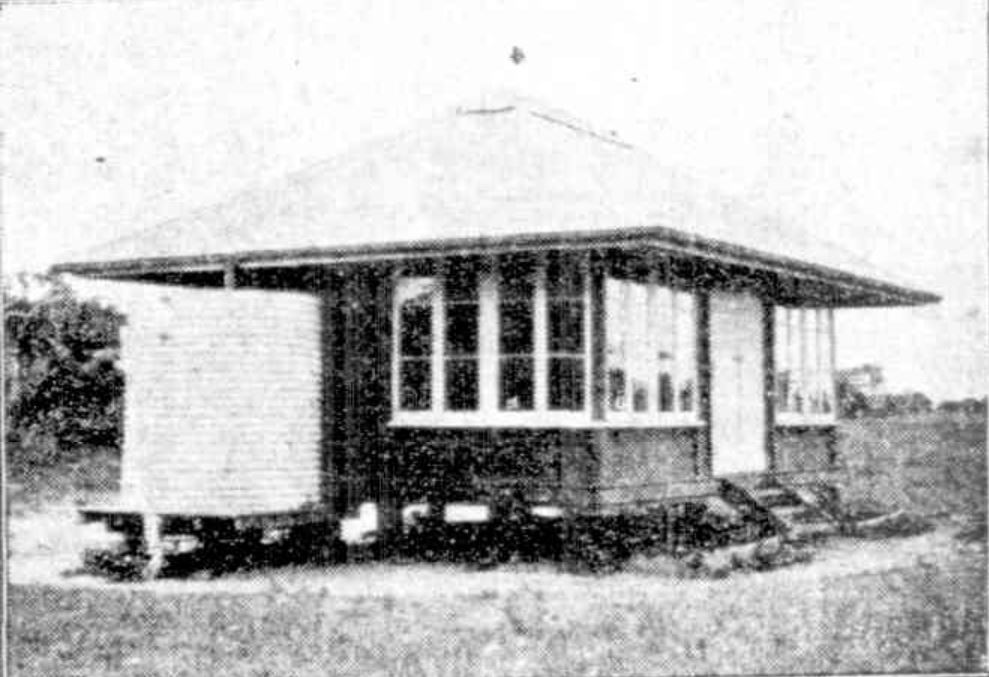
Sandhills State School, 1928

Mount Barlow Provisional School opened in 1903 and became Mount Barlow State School on 1 January 1909. It was renamed Sandhills State School about 1930 and then renamed Keppel Sands State School about 1938.

Keppel Sands Post Office opened on 1 September 1927.

Between 2008 and 2013, Keppel Sands and the rest of Shire of Livingstone was within the Rockhampton Region.

== Demographics ==
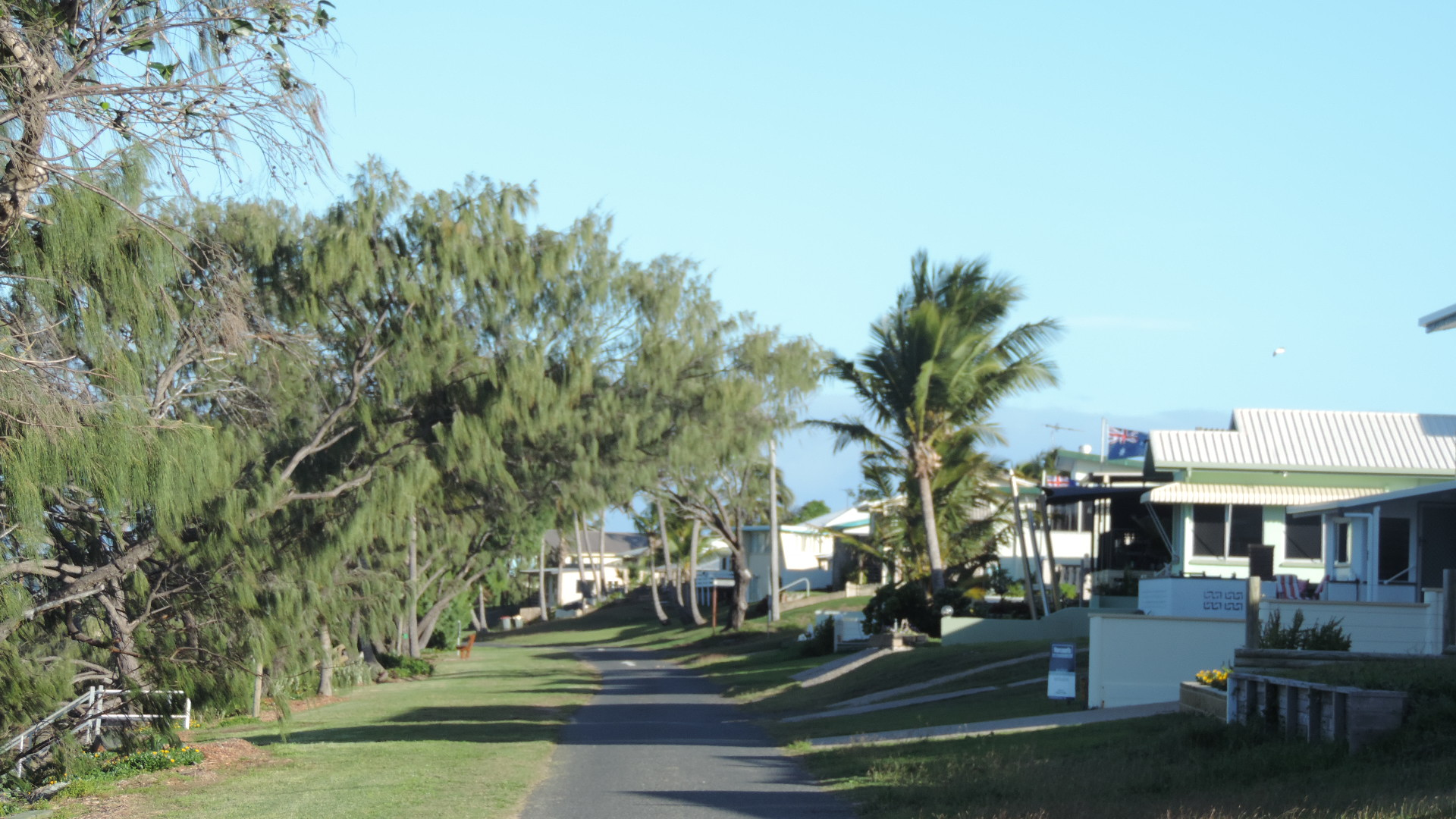
Housing along Schofield Parade (esplanade), 2016

In the 2006 census, the locality of Keppel Sands had a population of 332 people.

In the 2011 census, the locality of Keppel Sands had a population of 302 people.

In the 2016 census, the locality of Keppel Sands had a population of 360 people.

In the 2021 census, the locality of Keppel Sands had a population of 374 people.

== Education ==
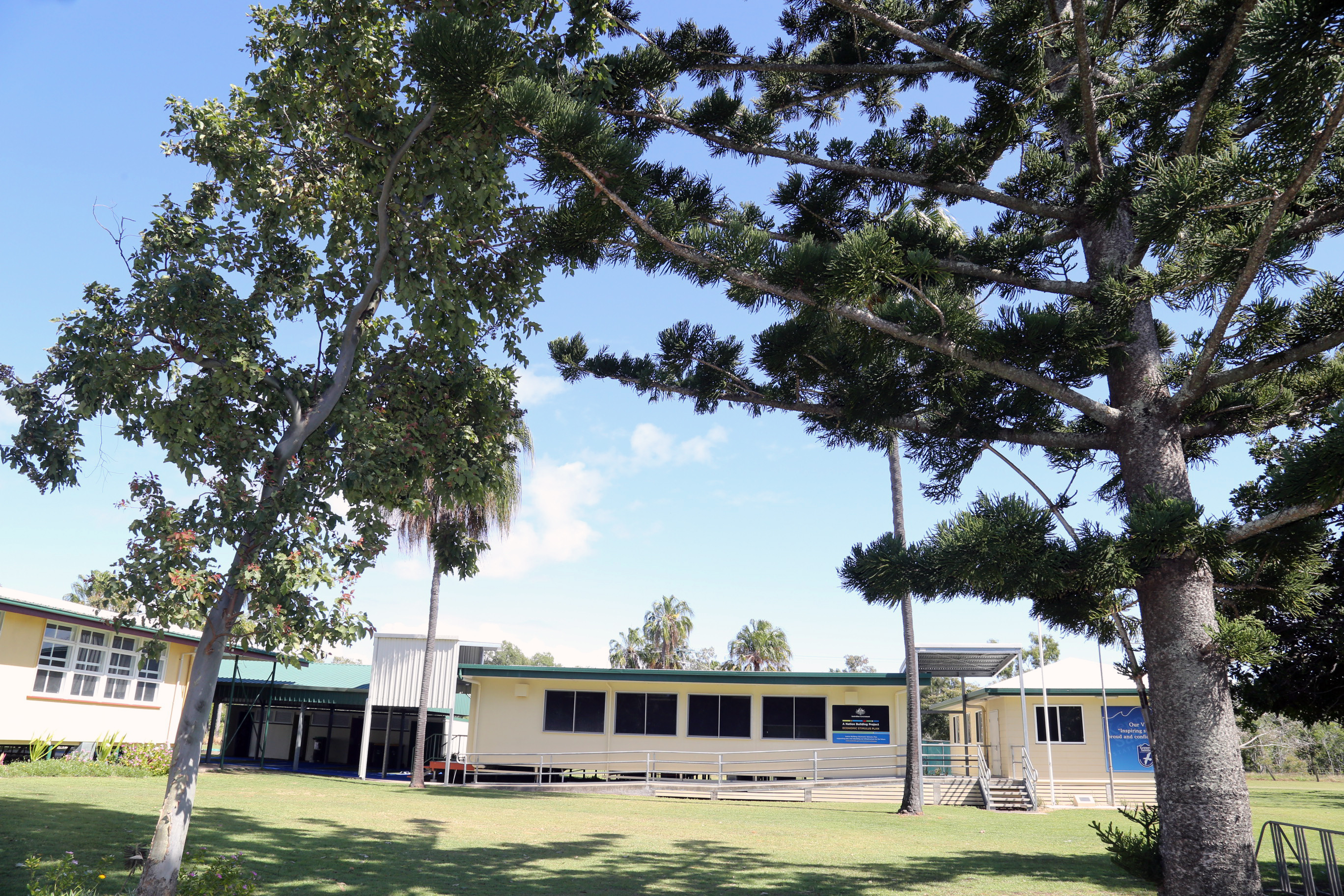
Keppel Sands State School, 2024

Keppel Sands State School is a government primary (Prep–6) school for boys and girls at 1325 Keppel Sands Road (23.3276°S 150.7863°E). In 2017, the school had an enrolment of 27 students with 3 teachers and 5 non-teaching staff (2 full-time equivalent). In 2018, the school had an enrolment of 28 students with 3 teachers and 5 non-teaching staff (2 full-time equivalent).

There are no secondary schools in Keppel Sands. The nearest government secondary school is Yeppoon State High School in Yeppoon to the north.

== Amenities ==
There are a number of parks in the area:

- Mabel Edmund Park (23.3384°S 150.7769°E)
- Schofield Park (23.3372°S 150.7972°E)

There are two boat ramps off Limpus Avenue on the north bank of Pumpkin Creek (23.3352°S 150.7933°E). They are managed by the Livingstone Shire Council.

Keppel Sands SES Facility is at 3 Musa Drive (23.3242°S 150.7910°E).

The Volunteer Coast Guard are located in Schofield Park at southern edge of the town.
