= Lakes Creek, Queensland =

Lakes Creek
- Suburb
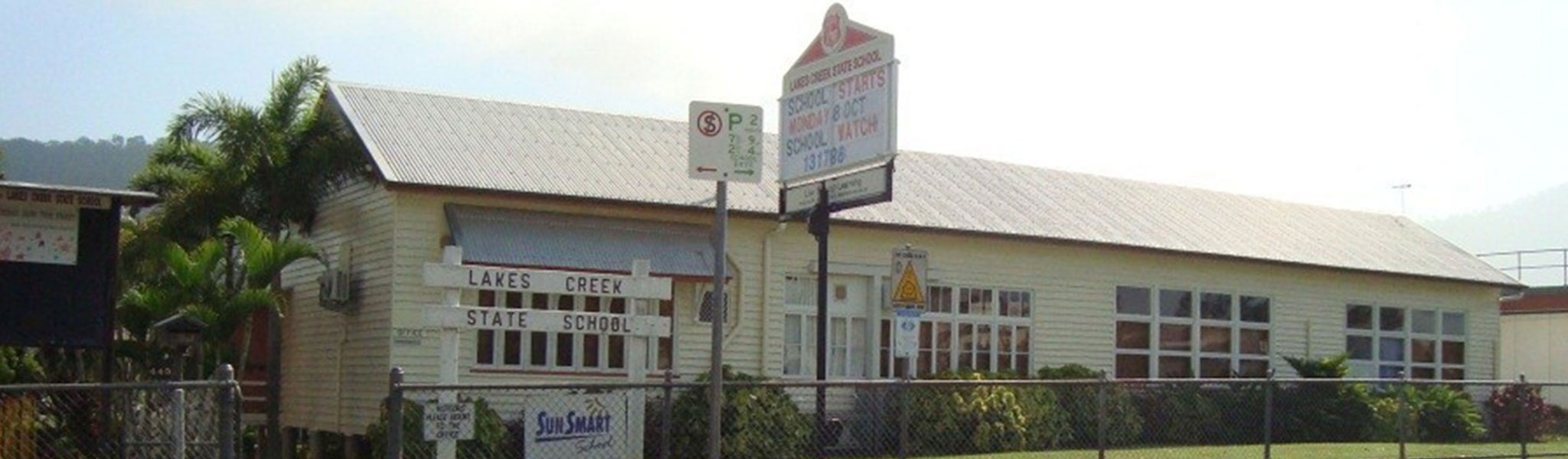
- Lakes Creek State School, 2025

- Interactive map of Lakes Creek
- Coordinates: 23.3741°S 150.5713°E
- Country: Australia
- State: Queensland
- LGAs: Rockhampton Region; Shire of Livingstone
- Location: 8.1 km (5.0 mi) ESE of Rockhampton CBD; 43.5 km (27.0 mi) SW of Yeppoon; 646 km (401 mi) NNW of Brisbane

Government
  - State electorates: Keppel; Rockhampton
  - Federal division: Capricornia

Area
  - Total: 10.8 km^{2} (4.2 sq mi)

Population
  - Total: 633 (2021 census)
  - Density: 58.6/km^{2} (151.8/sq mi)
- Postcode: 4701
Suburbs around Lakes Creek
Frenchville	Mount Archer	Nerimbera
Koongal	Lakes Creek	Nerimbera
Port Curtis	Port Curtis	Nerimbera

Lakes Creek is a suburb split between Rockhampton Region and Shire of Livingstone, Queensland, Australia. In the 2021 census, Lakes Creek had a population of 633 people.

== Geography ==
Lakes Creek is predominantly in Rockhampton Region with 10.4 square kilometres (4.0 sq mi) compared to Shire of Livingstone with 0.4 square kilometres (0.15 sq mi). The suburb is bordered to the south-west by the Fitzroy River. The developed land in the suburb is predominantly near the river approx 10 to 20 metres (33 to 66 ft) above sea level (and is entirely within the Rockhampton Region). The bulk of the land is mountainous and undeveloped rising to peaks such as:

- Mount Birkbeck (23.3539°S 150.5816°E) at 410 metres (1,350 ft) above sea level

Much of this undeveloped mountainous land in the north-east of the locality is within the Mount Archer National Park.

The developed land use is a mix of residential and industrial. Teys Australia operate a large abattoir and feedlot in Lakes Creek. In 2013 it was the largest employer in Rockhampton with a staff of over 1000 people.

The Rockhampton–Emu Park Road enters the locality from the west (Koongal) and exits to south-east (Nerimbera).

== History ==
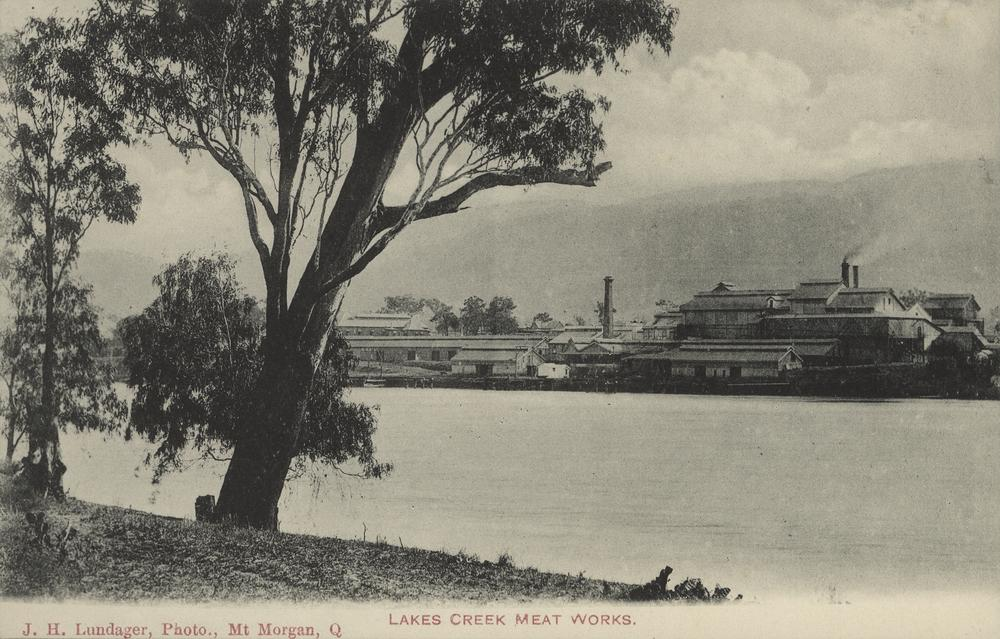
Lakes Creek Meat Works

On 14 September 1871, residents of the area who were mostly employees of the Central Queensland Meat Preserving Company held a meeting to establish a school in the area at which it was estimated that 25 children would attend the school if established. Although the building was completed in January 1872, Lakes Creek Provisional School did not open until 1 October 1872 but closed in 1874, reopening on 21 May 1877. In July 1894, the Queensland Government decided that the numbers of students in the area warranted a state school. In January 1895, Lakes Creek State School opened on the present site. The growth of the school over the years has resulted in increased land and buildings.

Lakes Creek Baptist Church opened on Tuesday 3 March 1914.

== Demographics ==
In the 2016 census, Lakes Creek had a population of 552 people.

In the 2021 census, Lakes Creek had a population of 633 people.

== Education ==
Lakes Creek State School is a government primary (Prep-6) school for boys and girls at 445 Paterson Street (23.3759°S 150.5600°E). In 2016, the school had an enrolment of 127 students with 8 teachers (7 full-time equivalent) and 9 non-teaching staff (5 full-time equivalent). In 2018, the school had an enrolment of 102 students with 8 teachers (7 full-time equivalent) and 12 non-teaching staff (7 full-time equivalent).

There are no secondary schools in Lakes Creek. The nearest government secondary school is North Rockhampton State High School in neighbouring Frenchville to the north-west.

There are numerous non-government schools in Rockhampton's suburbs.

== Amenities ==
Rocky Wesleyan Church is at 446 Paterson Drive (23.3762°S 150.5600°E). It is part of the Wesleyan Methodist Church.
