= Cawarral =

- Town
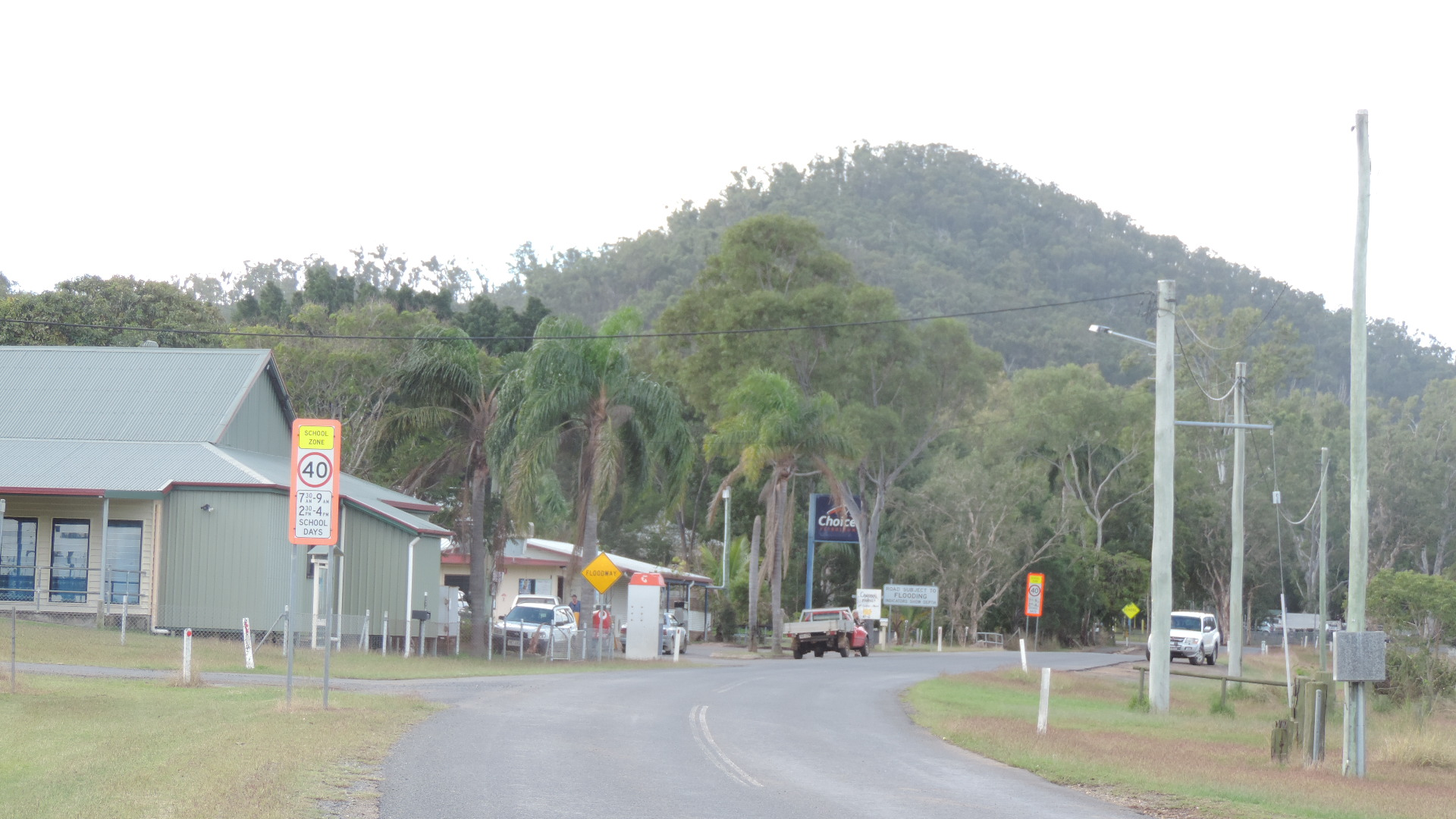
- Cawarral, 2016

- Interactive map of Cawarral
- Coordinates: 23.2562°S 150.6735°E
- Country: Australia
- State: Queensland
- LGA: Shire of Livingstone
- Location: 24.1 km (15.0 mi) SW of Yeppoon; 28.4 km (17.6 mi) NE of Rockhampton; 644 km (400 mi) NNW of Brisbane

Government
  - State electorate: Keppel
  - Federal division: Capricornia

Area
  - Total: 51.8 km^{2} (20.0 sq mi)

Population
  - Total: 831 (2021 census)
  - Density: 16.042/km^{2} (41.55/sq mi)
- Time zone: UTC+10:00 (AEST)
- Postcode: 4702
Localities around Cawarral
Mulara	Bondoola	Tanby
Ironpot	Cawarral	Coorooman
Mount Chalmers	Tungamull	Coowonga

Cawarral is a rural town and locality in the Livingstone Shire, Queensland, Australia. In the 2021 census, the locality of Cawarral had a population of 831 people.

== History ==
Cawarral State School opened on 13 July 1874.

== Demographics ==
In the 2011 census, the locality of Cawarral had a population of 726 people.

In the 2016 census, the locality of Cawarral had a population of 831 people.

In the 2021 census, the locality of Cawarral had a population of 831 people.

== Education ==
Cawarral State School is a government primary (Prep–6) school for boys and girls at 125 Annie Drive (23.2539°S 150.6756°E). In 2015, Cawarral State School had an enrolment of 87 students with 6 teachers (5 full-time equivalent). In 2018, the school had an enrolment of 85 students with 7 teachers (6 full-time equivalent) and 9 non-teaching staff (5 full-time equivalent).

There are no secondary schools in Cawarral. The nearest government secondary schools are Yeppoon State High School in Yeppoon to the north-east and Glenmore State High School in Kawana in Rockhampton to the south-west.

== Facilities ==
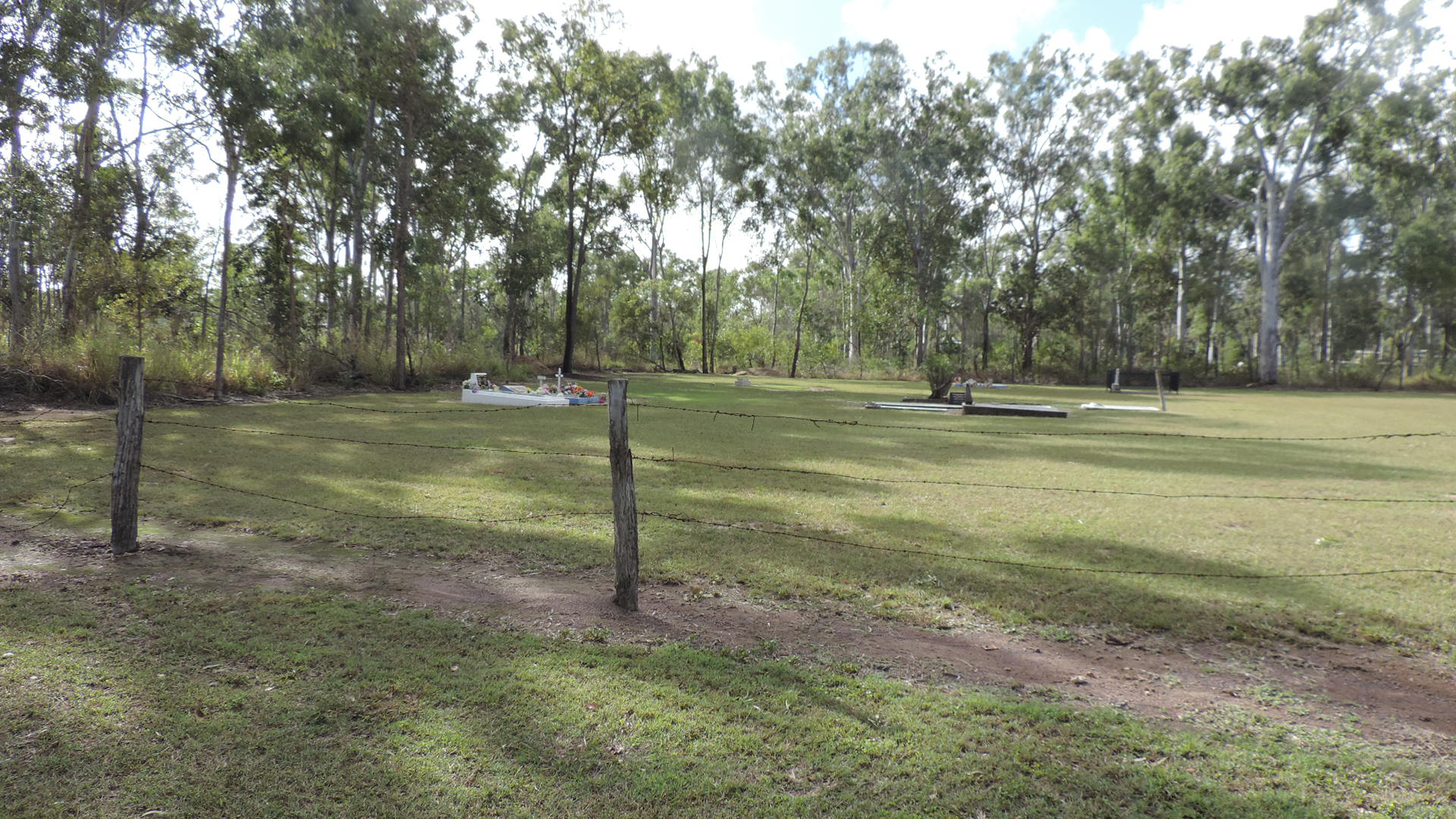
Cawarral cemetery, 2016

The Cawarral Cemetery is on the corner of Cemetery Road and Helena Lane (23.2630°S 150.6645°E) and is managed by the Livingstone Shire Council.
