= Frenchville, Queensland =

Frenchville
- Suburb
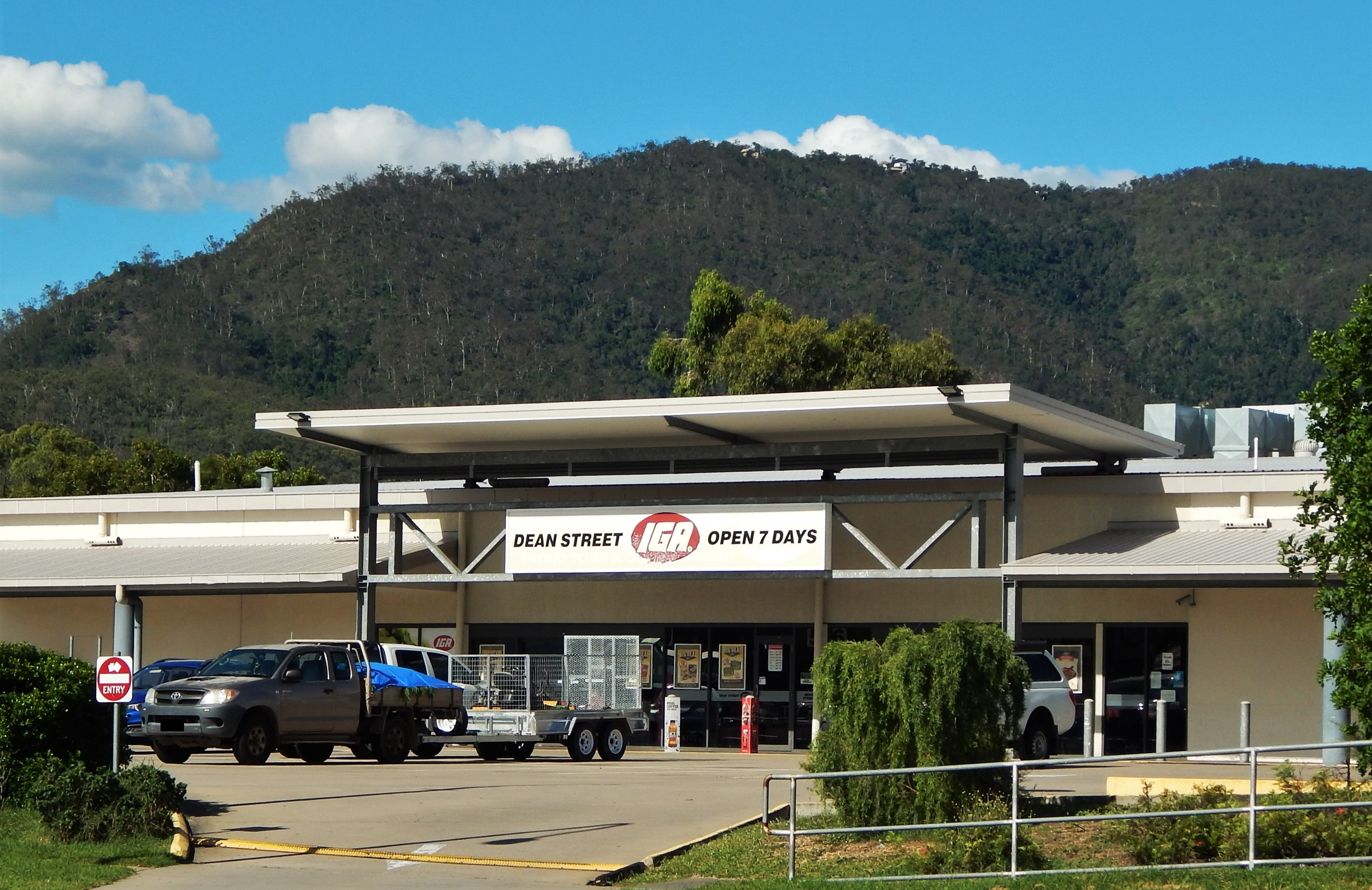
- Frenchville IGA with the Mount Archer in the background, 2020

- Interactive map of Frenchville
- Coordinates: 23.3491°S 150.5488°E
- Country: Australia
- State: Queensland
- City: Rockhampton
- LGA: Rockhampton Region
- Location: 6.1 km (3.8 mi) NE of Rockhampton CBD; 636 km (395 mi) NNW of Brisbane

Government
  - State electorates: Rockhampton; Keppel
  - Federal division: Capricornia

Area
  - Total: 8.6 km^{2} (3.3 sq mi)

Population
  - Total: 8,982 (2021 census)
  - Density: 1,044/km^{2} (2,705/sq mi)
- Time zone: UTC+10:00 (AEST)
- Postcode: 4701
Suburbs around Frenchville
Norman Gardens	Norman Gardens	Mount Archer
Norman Gardens	Frenchville	Lakes Creek
Park Avenue	Berserker	Koongal

Frenchville is a suburb of Rockhampton in the Rockhampton Region, Queensland, Australia. In the 2021 census, Frenchville had a population of 8,982 people.

== Geography ==
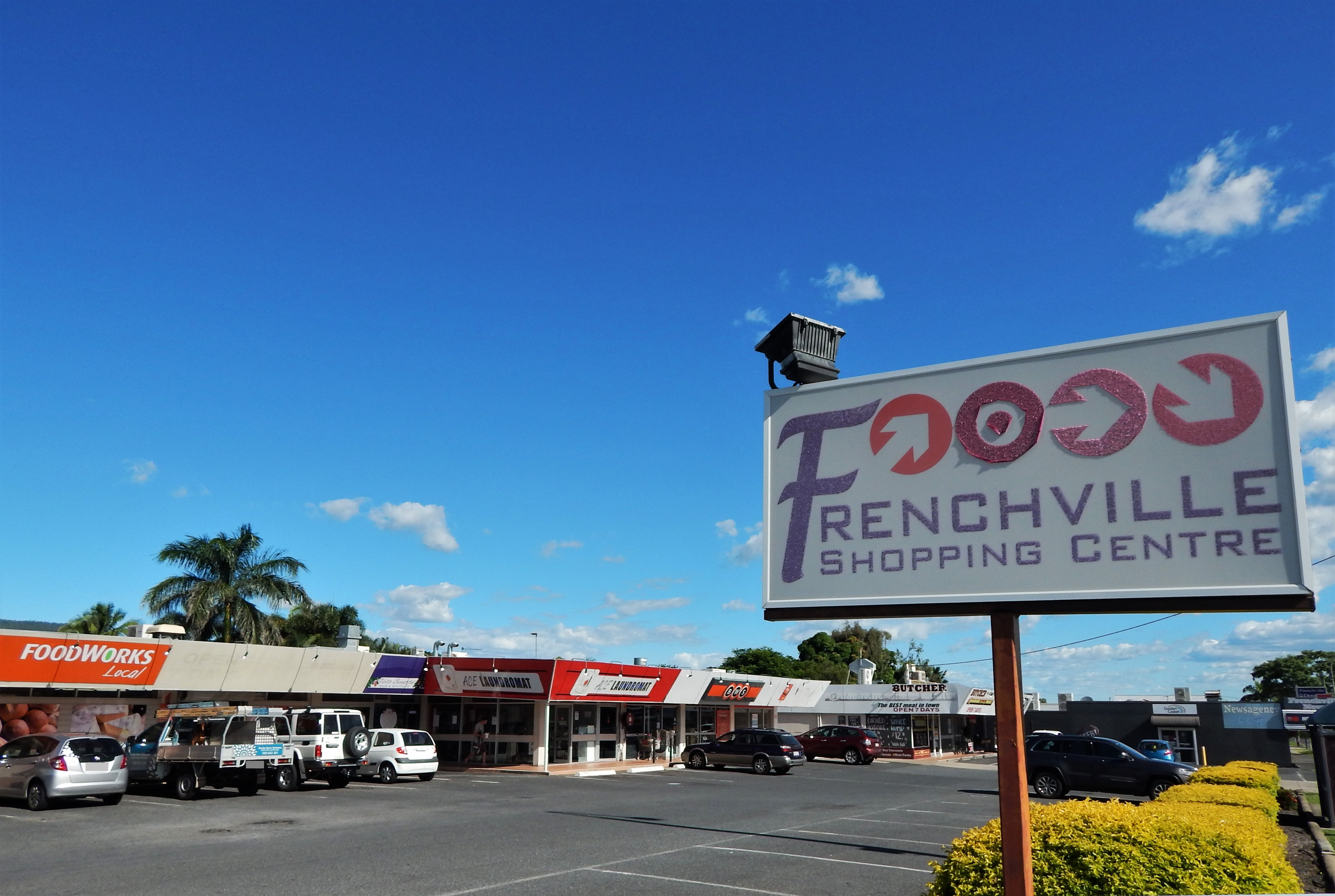
Dean Street shopping precinct, 2020

Situated at the base of Mount Archer in the Berserker Range about seven kilometres to the north of the Fitzroy River, the district was named for French botanist Anthelme Thozet, first director of the Rockhampton Botanic Gardens in the 1860s. Thozet established the second hotel in Rockhampton, the Alliance, but driven by a never failing professional interest in botany he commenced researching native Australian plants used by indigenous people of Northern Queensland, Australia including the Darumbal clans around Rockhampton. Thozet established his own plant nursery in North Rockhampton on 70 acres (280,000 m^{2}) which are today bounded by Thozet Creek, Thozet Road, Rockonia Road and the Fitzroy River (present day Koongal).

Frenchmans Creek which runs through the area was also named for Thozet. It enters the Fitzroy River at 23.3803°S 150.5458°E.

There is a shopping strip along Dean Street between Kerrigan Street and Gair Street (23.3471°S 150.537°E).

== History ==
Frenchman's Creek Provisional School opened on 22 November 1900. On 1 January 1909, it became Frenchman's Creek State School. In 1924, it was renamed Frenchville State School.

Frenchville Sports Club was established in 1948. Despite the name, it is now located at 105 Clifton Street, in neighbouring Berserker (23.3568°S 150.5295°E).

North Rockhampton State High School opened on 31 January 1956.

The area was completely rural in character until the late 1960s, with small holdings and dairy farms predominating. In the late 1960s suburban development rapidly took place and the small school rapidly grew to an enrolment of well over 1,000 in the late 1970s.

North Rockhampton Methodist Church opened in 1965. Following the amalgamation of the Methodist Church into the Uniting Church in Australia in 1977, it became the North Rockhampton Uniting Church. On 27 October 1989 a new church was officially opened beside the 1965 church, which was then re-purposed as a church hall.

Rockhampton North Special School opened on 24 January 1977.

== Demographics ==
In the 2011 census, Frenchville had a population of 9,159 people.

In the 2016 census, Frenchville had a population of 9,028 people.

In the 2021 census, Frenchville had a population of 8,982 people.

== Education ==
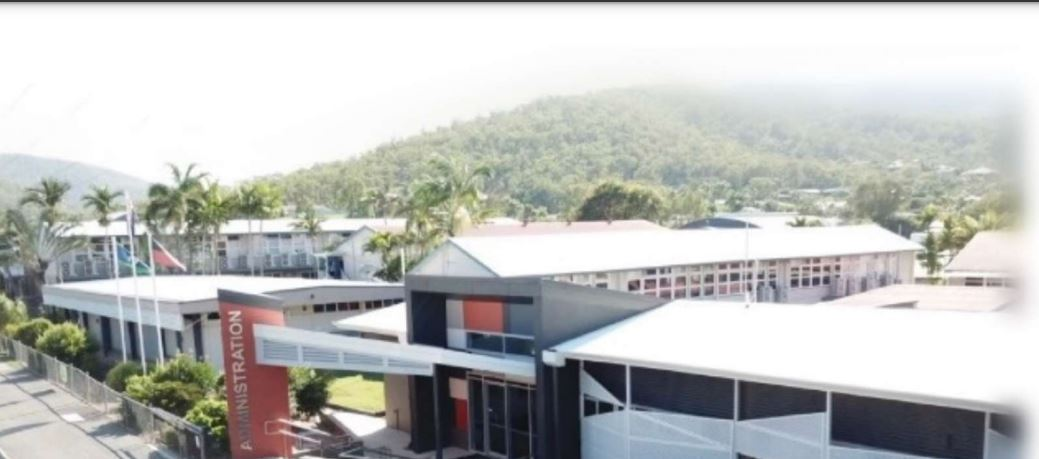
Frenchville State School, 2022

Frenchville State School is a government primary (Prep-6) school for boys and girls at Frenchville Road (23.3418°S 150.5438°E). In 2017, the school had an enrolment of 1,023 students with 70 teachers (62 full-time equivalent) and 34 non-teaching staff (24 full-time equivalent). It includes a special education program.

North Rockhampton State High School is a government secondary (7-12) school for boys and girls at 302-328 Berserker Street (23.3521°S 150.5316°E). It includes a special education program. In 2015, the school had an enrolment of 966 students with 82 teachers (77 full-time equivalent). In 2017, the school had an enrolment of 911 students with 81 teachers (77 full-time equivalent) and 43 non-teaching staff (32 full-time equivalent).

Rockhampton North Special School is a special primary and secondary (Prep-12) school for boys and girls at 353-359 Dean Street (23.3494°S 150.5368°E). In 2017, the school had an enrolment of 102 students with 23 teachers and 29 non-teaching staff (19 full-time equivalent).

== Amenities ==
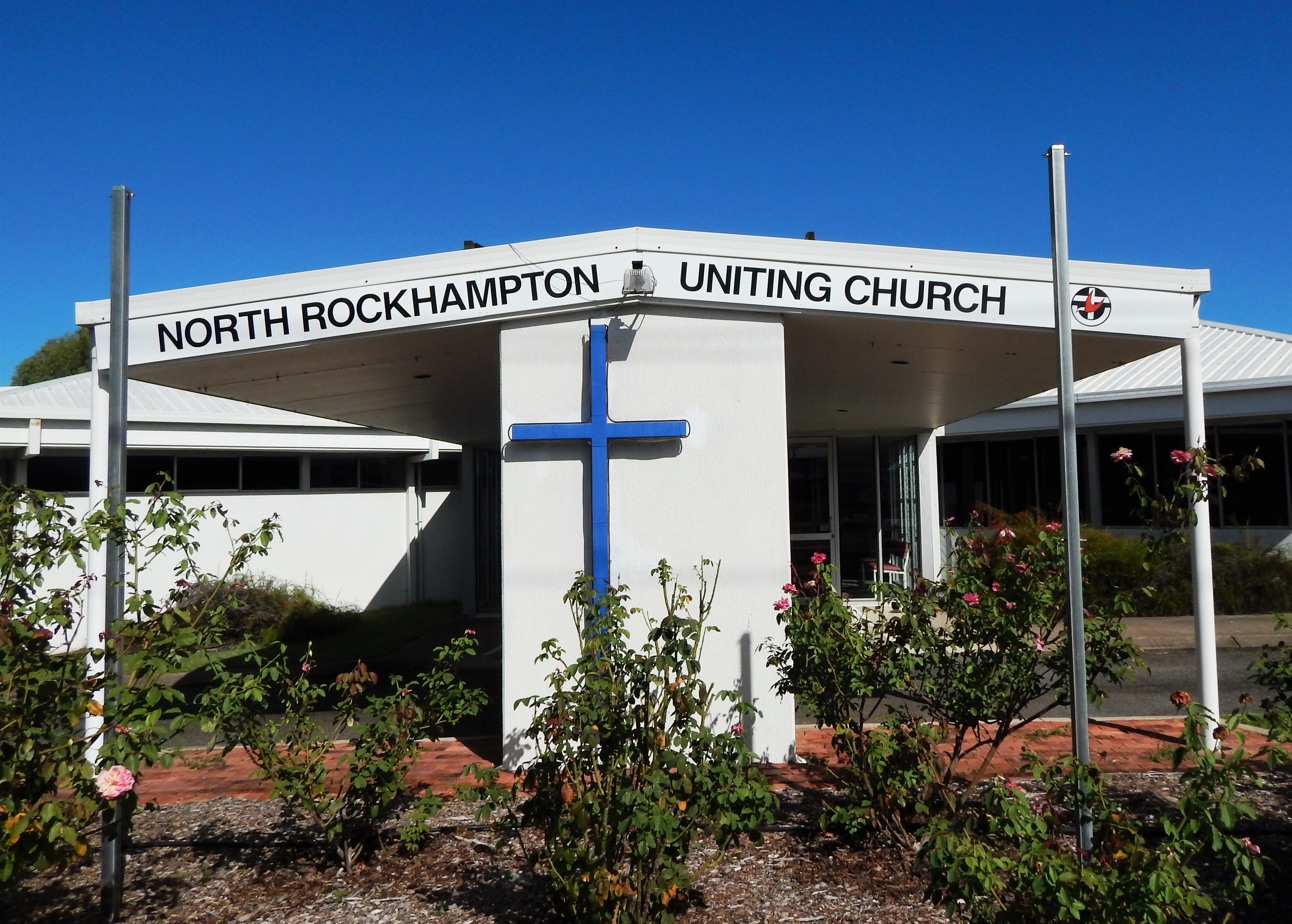
North Rockhampton Uniting Church, 2020

Frenchville Post Office is at 378 Dean Street (23.3475°S 150.5375°E).

North Rockhampton Police Station is 171 Dean Street (corner of Robinson Street, 23.3520°S 150.5360°E).

St David's Anglican Church is at 134 Simpson Street (23.3542°S 150.5322°E). It is part of the Parish of North Rockhampton (also known as the All Saints Anglican Community) within the Anglican Church of Central Queensland.

North Rockhampton Uniting Church is at 321 Berserker Street (23.3523°S 150.5312°E); it is within the Fitzroy Parish of the Uniting Church in Australia.

The Rockpool Water Park at 330 Berserker Street (23.3508°S 150.5324°E) is operated by the Rockhampton Regional Council. It includes the 42nd Battalion Memorial Pool, waterslides and minigolf. The memorial pool commemorates those who served in the Capricornia Regiment of the 42nd Battalion during World War II.
