= Capricorn Coast =

- Region
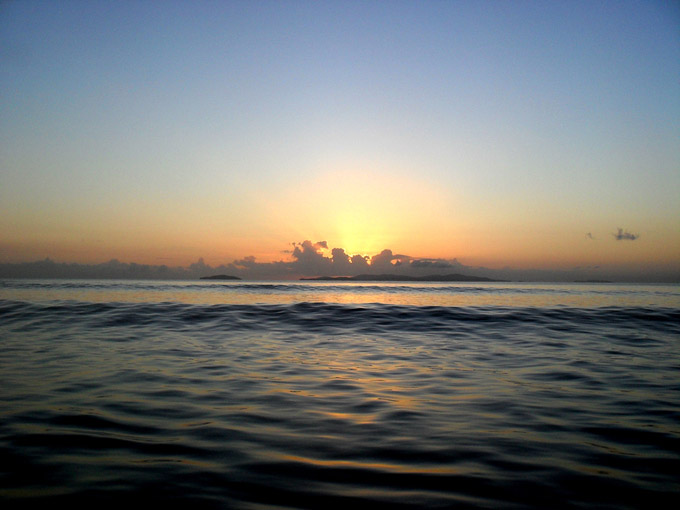
- Sunrise over Great Keppel Island

- Coordinates: 23.2667°S 150.8167°E
- Country: Australia
- State: Queensland
- LGA: Rockhampton Region
- Location: 39 km (24 mi) E of Rockhampton; 676 km (420 mi) NW of Brisbane

Government
  - State electorate: Keppel
  - Federal division: Capricornia
- Postcode: 4702, 4703, 4710

The Capricorn Coast is a stretch of coastline in Central Queensland, Australia and is part of the Shire of Livingstone (formerly part of Rockhampton Region).

== Geography ==
The Capricorn Coasts takes its name from Cape Capricorn (23.4856°S 151.2356°E) on Curtis Island, which in turn takes its name from the Tropic of Capricorn (approx 23.4364°S 150.83036°E) which passes through roughly through the cape. The Tropic also passes through Capricorn Coast.

The Capricorn Coast is officially defined as "the coastal area between the mouth of Water Park Creek and the mouth of the Fitzroy River", which establishes its boundaries as 22°56′41″S 150°47′11″E and 23°32′07″S 150°52′35″E, i.e. from Farnborough to Thompson Point. The Capricorn Coast is approximately 75 km (47 mi) from end to end with dozens of towns and islands scattered along its length.

== Governance ==
In 1879, the Gogango Divisional Board was established as one of 74 divisions in Queensland under the Divisional Boards Act 1879. The Gogango Divisional Board's scope of authority comprised a large area north and east of Rockhampton. While the Division was administered in Rockhampton, a locally appointed body, the Yeppoon Progress Association met once a month to look after the minor requirements of the town.

The discovery of gold brought a huge influx of people to the region, and the various Boards broke up into smaller administrative bodies to better service the growing population. In 1903, the Gogango Divisional Board was renamed Shire of Livingstone.

The boundaries of the new shire remained largely unchanged until 1984, when outlying districts including the suburbs of Nerimbera and Parkhurst were ceded to Livingstone's larger neighbour, City of Rockhampton. Continued growth in both Local Government Authorities became a contentious subject from then on, which caused much political tension, until finally in 2007, the conflict gained new pace with the tabling before the Parliament of Queensland of the proposed Local Government (Reform Implementation) Act 2007.

The Act passed, and on 15 March 2008, Livingstone Shire merged with Fitzroy Shire, Mount Morgan Shire, and City of Rockhampton to form the new LGA Rockhampton Region. This forced amalgamation caused political tension. In 2012, a proposal was made to de-amalgamate the Shire of Livingstone from the Rockhampton Region. On 9 March 2013, the citizens of the former Livingstone shire voted in a referendum to de-amalgamate. The Shire of Livingstone was re-established on 1 January 2014. Nerimbera was returned to the Shire of Livingstone but Parkhurst remains within the Rockhampton Region.

== Towns and localities ==
The following is a list of coastal towns and localities of the Capricorn Coast (from north to south):

- Farnborough including Bangalee
- Yeppoon
- Cooee Bay
- Lammermoor
- Rosslyn
- Mulambin
- Causeway Lake
- Kinka Beach
- Emu Park
- Zilzie
- Keppel Sands
- Joskeleigh
- Thompson Point

== Geography ==
The Capricorn Coast features long sweeping beaches with shallow seas, dotted with rocky outcrops, the remnants of long-extinct volcanoes. The soil inland is red which is well suited to the many fruit crops growing in the area, while pockets of darker soils and clays are more suitable for grazing. In the north, the hills rise to form the Byfield Range which is home to stands of virgin rainforest.

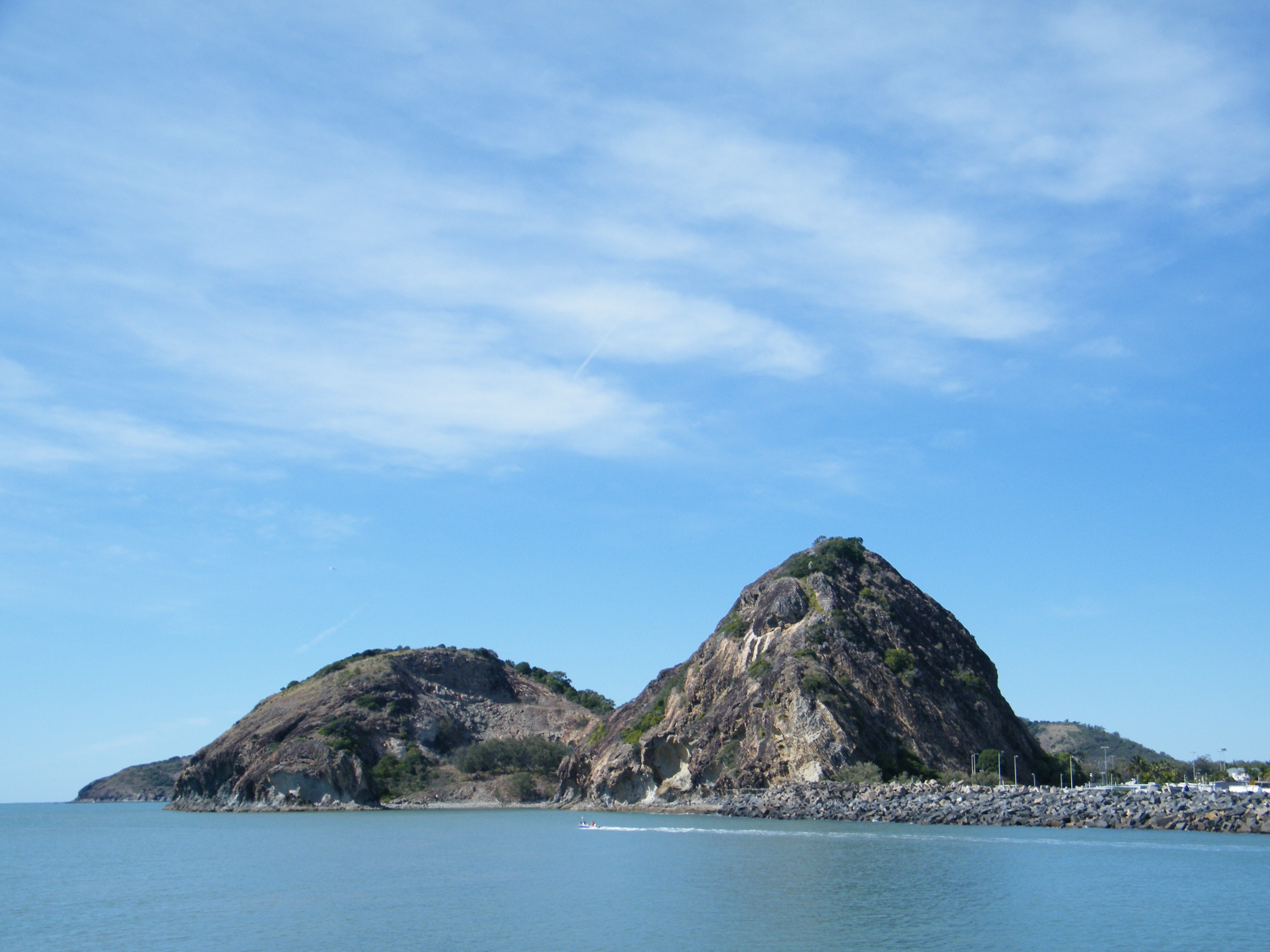
Double Head volcanic plug near Rosslyn Bay Marina.

Most of the population of the Capricorn Coast is centred in and around Yeppoon and Emu Park. The two towns are joined by the coastal Scenic Highway The two towns are also linked by Tanby Road which is an inland route.

=== Sub-regions ===
Due to the size of the Capricorn Coast, its geography and demographics are diverse, however the region has four distinct sections within it:

- Northern – From Stanage Bay to Bungundarra; very low population, areas of wetlands, rainforests, and large swathes of protected areas;
- Central – South of Bungundarra to Zilzie; major population areas, beaches, urban, and semi-rural;
- Southern – South and inland from Zilzie to the Fitzroy River; low population, beaches, tidal flats, rural, village-type communities;
- Offshore – Islands beyond the mainland coves in Keppel and Shoalwater Bays; very low population, tourist and conservation areas.

=== Northern section ===
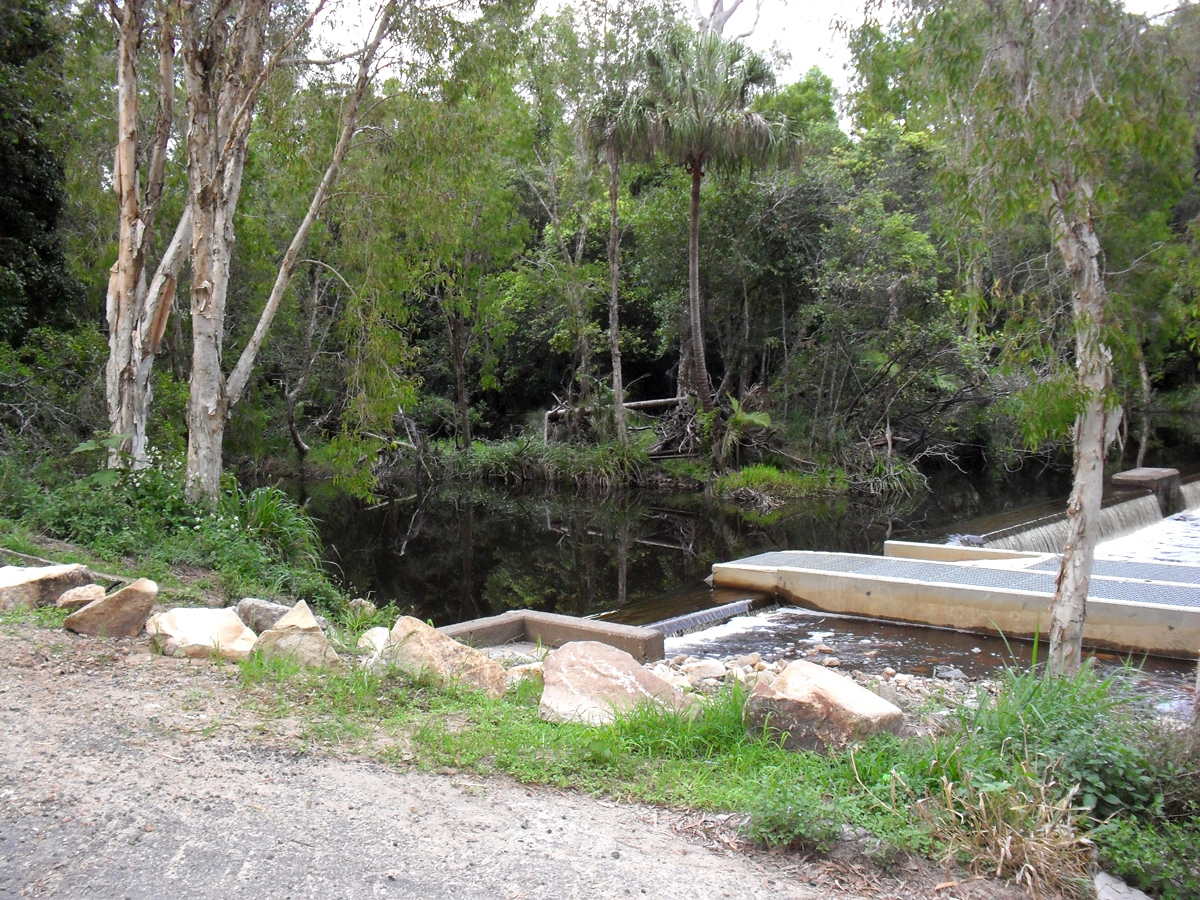
Waterpark Creek Byfield

Towns, suburbs, and localities in the northern section of the Capricorn Coast are: Barmaryee, Byfield, Byfield National Park, Cooberie, Corio Bay, Farnborough, Five Rocks, Inverness, Red Rock Forest, Shoalwater Bay, Stanage Bay, Stockyard, Upper Stoney Creek, Waterpark Creek.

Just north of Yeppoon, the geography subtly begins to change. Beyond the beaches and bays, flat pastures give way to rolling hillocks, mountains, ranges and the streams of the Byfield township and Byfield National Park.

Red Rock, Waterpark Creek, and Upper Stoney Creek are popular camping grounds. Byfield also features Fern's Hideaway, a holiday retreat and restaurant set on the forested banks of Waterpark Creek. On the coast, sweeping beaches interspersed with coral cays back onto the world-heritage Iwasaki and Shoalwater Wetlands. Regardless of the risks, Stockyard, Corbett's Landing, and Sandfly Creek are popular fishing locations.

Further north, and despite its remoteness, Five Rocks is a popular camping and 4WD destinations. Beyond are the areas of Shoalwater Bay, Townshend Island, and Stanage.

=== Central section ===
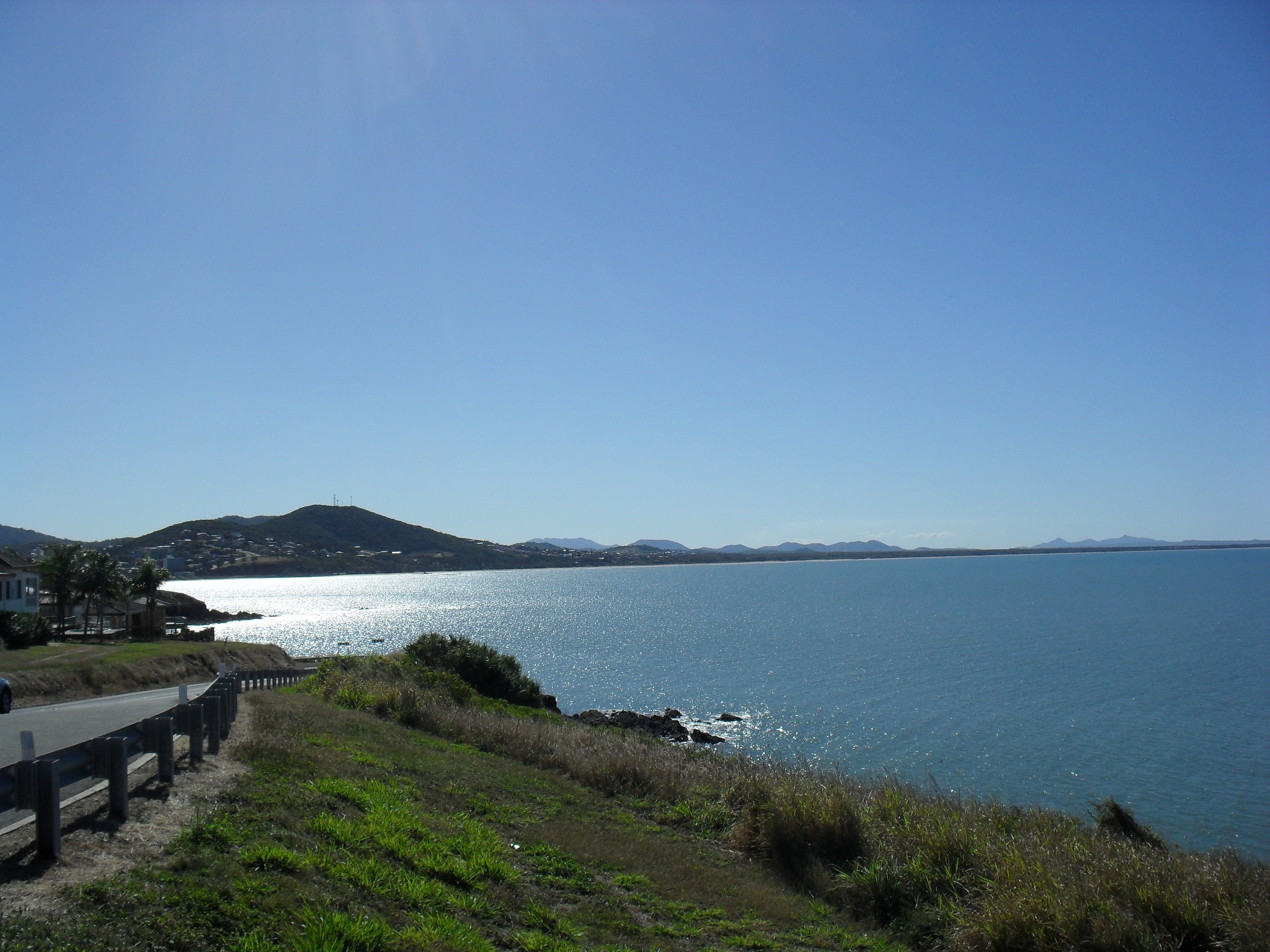
Looking north from Wreck Point across Yeppoon to the Byfield Ranges

Towns, suburbs, and localities in the central section of the Capricorn Coast are: Adelaide Park, Bangalee, Barlows Hill, Bluff Rock, Capricorn Coast National Park, Causeway Lake, Cooee Bay, Creek Rock, Emu Park, Kemp Beach, Keppel Bay Estate, Kinka Beach, Lammermoor, Meikleville Hill, Mulambin, Mulambin Waters, Ocean View, Pacific Heights, Rosslyn, Statue Bay, Taranganba, Yeppoon, Wreck Point, Zilzie.

Forty kilometres of long beaches and shallow coves grace the Central Capricorn Coast from Farnborough in the north to Zilzie in the south. Dotted along the way are a dozen seaside communities, and the major towns of Yeppoon and Emu Park. Clearly visible from every beach along the way is Great Keppel Island, thirty minutes away by boat.

Yeppoon and Emu Park are connected by the Scenic Highway. Adjoining Yeppoon to the south are the seaside communities of Cooee Bay and Taranganba, and then the tourist beach, Lammermoor, popular for its clean sands and beach rock formations. Continuing on southward is the fishing beach, Statue Bay, and then the Keppel Bay Marina, a 400 berth marina at Rosslyn Bay. Around the corner, the long stretch of shallow coves continue; Kemp Beach with Bluff Rock just a ten-minute kayak offshore, and then Mulambin Beach. A few minutes further is Causeway Lake with hire boats and stores. Across the bridge, is Kinka Beach, and then Emu Park and Zilzie.

=== Southern section ===
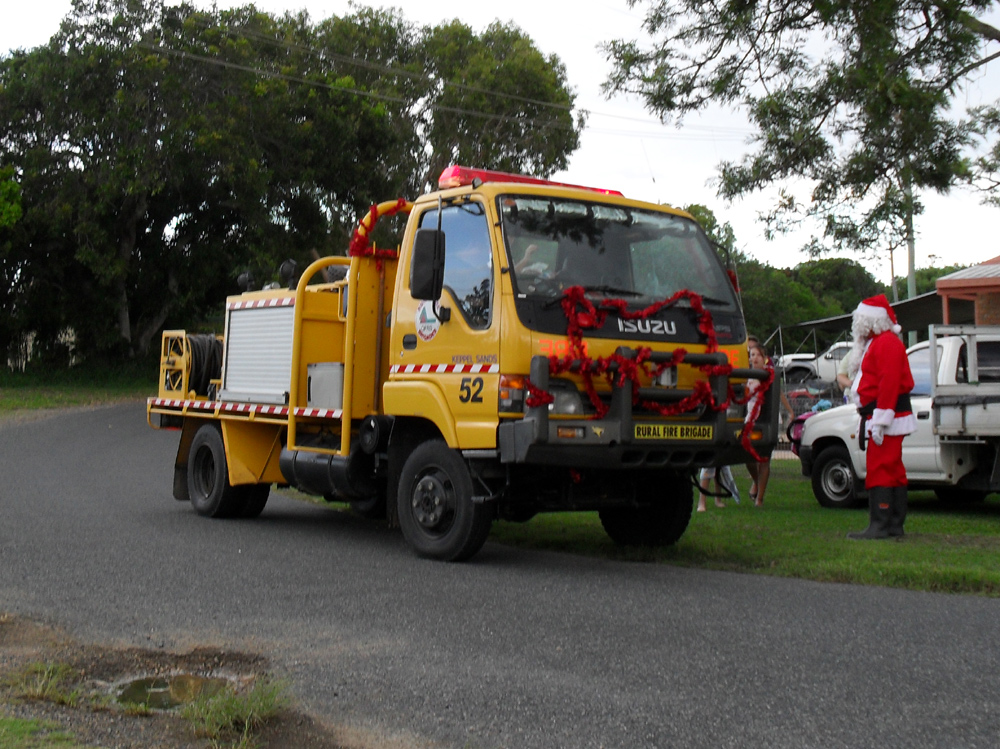
The Keppel Sands Rural Fire Brigade helping Santa hand out lollies at Christmas

Towns, suburbs, and localities in the southern section of the Capricorn Coast are Coowonga, Girt Island, Joskeleigh, Keppel Sands, Long Beach (or Joskeleigh Beach), Quartz Rock, Thompson's Point.

Often referred to as the "forgotten" end of the Capricorn Coast, the rural and seaside communities south of the major population centres have two principal commons; they are centred on the life-giving waterways in the area, such as Coorooman Creek and the Fitzroy River.

Fishing and boating are popular pursuits, with community festivals well frequented, and local support groups such as the Rural Fire Brigade well attended.

=== Offshore islands ===
Islands, atolls, and localities in the bays of the Capricorn Coast are: Arch Rock, Conical Rocks, Corroberee Island, Entrance Rocks, Flat Rock, Great Keppel Island, Half Tide Rocks, Keppel Bay Islands National Park including Pelican Island, Divided Island, Conical Island, Halfway Island, Humpy Island, Miall Island, North Keppel Island, Middle Island, Peak Island, Man and Wife Rocks, Mother Macgregor Island, Outer Rocks, Pelican Rock, Pumpkin Island, Round Rock, Sloping Island, Split Rock, Square Rocks, Wedge Island.

== Climate ==
The Capricorn Coast experiences a humid subtropical climate (Köppen climate classification Cfa/Cwa).

Due to its location in the southern tropics, the Capricorn Coast experiences hot summers without the extreme humidity of Far North Queensland, and mild winters without the freezing temperatures of the south. The year round temperate climate lends itself well to a relaxed lifestyle, which has proven popular with new families moving to the Capricorn Coast on the back of the mining boom.

Climate data for Yeppoon The Esplanade
Month	Jan	Feb	Mar	Apr	May	Jun	Jul	Aug	Sep	Oct	Nov	Dec	Year
Mean daily maximum °C (°F)	29.3 (84.7)	29.3 (84.7)	28.4 (83.1)	26.6 (79.9)	24.2 (75.6)	21.9 (71.4)	21.4 (70.5)	22.1 (71.8)	24.3 (75.7)	26.1 (79.0)	27.4 (81.3)	28.8 (83.8)	25.8 (78.4)
Mean daily minimum °C (°F)	23.7 (74.7)	23.7 (74.7)	22.4 (72.3)	19.7 (67.5)	15.6 (60.1)	13.3 (55.9)	11.7 (53.1)	12.7 (54.9)	15.6 (60.1)	19.1 (66.4)	21.3 (70.3)	22.8 (73.0)	18.5 (65.3)
Average precipitation mm (inches)	123.5 (4.86)	170.4 (6.71)	90.1 (3.55)	70.4 (2.77)	74.4 (2.93)	59.1 (2.33)	25.6 (1.01)	40.3 (1.59)	36.8 (1.45)	48.8 (1.92)	74.5 (2.93)	131.0 (5.16)	928.8 (36.57)
Source: Australian Bureau of Meteorology

== History ==
=== Indigenous history ===
The Capricorn Coast and indeed the area that comprises most of the Rockhampton Region is the traditional land of the Darumbal Aboriginal peoples. Offshore, the Keppel Bay Islands National Park is home to the Kanomi-Woppaburra people (The Keppel Islanders).

On the coast, alliances existed between tribes, and clans within tribes. The Kuinmurrburra nation had six allied tribes within it; the Kutuburra, Ristebura, Wanuburra, Wuruburra, Pukanburra, and Muinburra, which existed in relative harmony to allow for nature's swinging moods. The island natives did not interact with the mainland Darumbals, for they feared each other and spoke a much different dialect. With the settlement of Yeppoon in the late 1860s, the principal landholder on the Capricorn Coast, Robert Ross, removed the Kanomi population from North Keppel because they were disturbing his cattle.

The last of the Keppel Islanders were forcibly removed by the Queensland Government in 1912. The Darumbal Dreamtime Centre in Rockhampton, adjacent to the Yeppoon turnoff, is the largest Aboriginal cultural centre in Australia.

=== European settlement ===
==== Discovery and exploration ====
The Capricorn Coast was first explored by James Cook in 1770. He did not make landing in the area however he named several islands and land forms; Cape Capricorn, Keppel Isles, Keppel Bay, Cape Many Fold (later Cape Manifold), and Shoal Water Bay (later Shoalwater Bay).

Matthew Flinders explored the Capricorn Coast in great detail in 1804. Flinders spent the best part of a month in the shallow bays, making landings at Curtis Island, Port Clinton, Shoalwater Bay and Percy Island. Matthew Flinders Drive, a scenic cliffside road that winds through Cooee Bay and up over the top of Wreck Point, is named in his honour.

Phillip Parker King followed in 1820 but encountered difficulties when his ship, the Mermaid, ran aground. In 1843, an extensive survey was carried out by Captain Francis Price Blackwood on HMS Fly and Captain Charles Yule who commanded HMS Bramble.

In 1844 and 1846, Ludwig Leichhardt and Thomas Mitchell explored what would later become Rockhampton, noting the quality of grazing lands in the district.

In 1853, brothers William and Charles Archer followed in the footsteps of Leichhardt and Mitchell. They settled in Gracemere, twelve kilometres west of the present day City of Rockhampton. By 1858, the town of Rockhampton was officially proclaimed, and settlement began in earnest.

==== Settlement ====
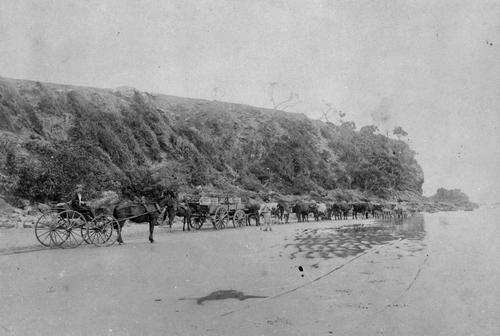
Bullock train on the beach, Yeppoon 1887

In 1867, the town reserve was surveyed then proclaimed as suitable for settlement. The Government Surveyor reported the site as "Yapoon, a spot northward of Emu Park about nine miles, was most suitable as a watering place." The name, especially given its definition, is believed to have come from the Darumbal people, the indigenous tribe local to the region. Indeed, on the western fringe of Rockhampton, an expansive wetlands system was named Yeppen-Yeppen Lagoon. On that basis, the etymology of the two districts is believed to be the same.

Initial settlement was slow however. Though intended to become a township, the region's rich soils attracted farmers rather than townspeople. This changed the following year with the commencement of regular stagecoach services from Rockhampton, and the continued mining of copper and gold in the coastal hinterlands around Cawarral and Mount Chalmers.

By 1889, the town was growing steadily, and boasted several hotels and boarding houses, a sugar mill, a telegraph service, a Methodist-Presbyterian church, and Yeppoon's first state school which is today a heritage listed building.

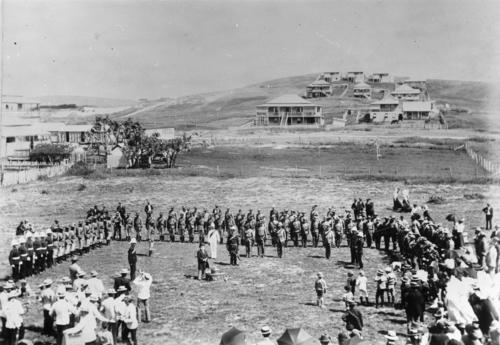
Soldiers at assembly, Emu Park 1898

With primary production the lifeblood of the town, better transportation was needed, not only to Rockhampton but along the coast as well.

Steam wagons followed and the north of Yeppoon opened up to new commerce and communities. Pastoral Lands and settlements now filled the landscape from Woodbury and Byfield in the north, inland through Bungundarra, Lake Mary, Tanby, Mount Chalmers, and Cawarral. South of Yeppoon, all arable lands through Taranganba, Lammermoor, and Mulambin were also claimed as far as to present day Causeway Lake.

South of the lake, progress was also running full steam. The new town of Emu Park was taking form with the completion of the first coastal railway from Rockhampton in 1889. Even at this early stage of Capricorn Coast history, Emu Park and Yeppoon shared an odd rivalry, with Emu Park attracting the more elite section of Rockhampton and Mount Morgan society, while the "common man", especially gold miners from Cawarral and Mount Chalmers gravitated towards Yeppoon.

With Emu Park separated from Yeppoon by the expansive Causeway Lake and the shifting dunes of Kinka, that sense of separateness between the two seaside towns continued for another fifty years until a permanent tide-proof causeway was finally constructed to join the two ends of the coast.

That separate history however, allowed Emu Park and Yeppoon to develop distinct personalities that are still apparent today.

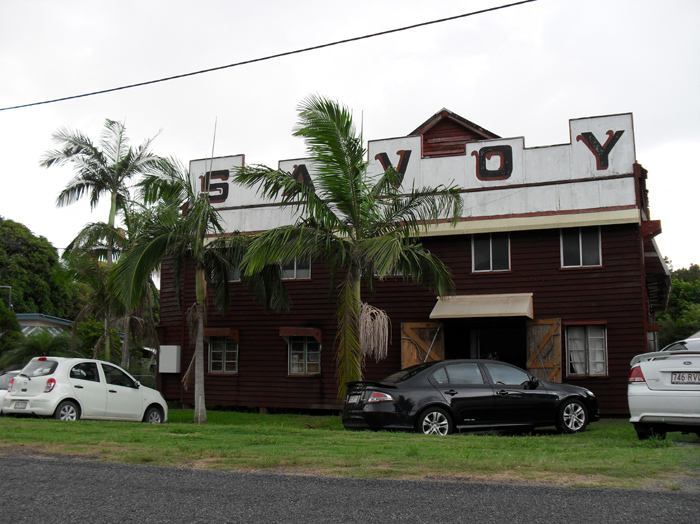
The historic Savoy Theatre at Keppel Sands

The rail line also made access easier to Keppel Sands, at least for half of the journey, with a siding located at Tungamull. From there, the fifteen kilometre trek to Sand Hills as the township was then named, was fraught with peril, not least of which was the permanent wetlands that effectively made the town an island. Monsoonal rains could isolate Keppel Sands for several weeks.

It was because of this inaccessibility that Keppel Sands failed to grow at the same pace as its sister towns across Coorooman Creek, but nonetheless a pioneering spirit from local residents saw the township prevail. In 1893, the Sand Hills State School opened.

Joskeleigh is home to a South Sea Islander community, descendants of people brought to Australia as indentured labourers to work on sugar and tobacco plantations.

==== The railway ====
From its early years, Emu Park was a seaside resort visited by residents of Rockhampton and by gold miners from Mount Morgan, who lobbied the Queensland Government for a rail link to the town. In late 1888, the Rockhampton–Emu Park railway line opened. New settlements developed along the railway, and new stations and sidings were established at Nerimbera, Nankin, Sleipner, Tungamull, Coowonga, Coorooman, and Tanby.

Heritage listed Yeppoon Railway Station in 2011.

In 1908, a branch line was opened at Sleipner Junction to service the gold towns of Mount Chalmer.

During the 1960s, the Emu Park rail line was progressively decommissioned, however the original building at Nankin still stands. At Tungamull directly before the Keppel Sands Road turnoff, pylons that supported the rail bridge are also clearly visible beside the floodway crossing. The Emu Park Museum also houses many historical relics of the rail line that helped make the remote southern communities of the Capricorn Coast more accessible to the public.

Passenger trains ceased running to Mount Chalmers, Cawarral, and Yeppoon in 2000 with the advent much-improved roads to Rockhampton. Viability of the line was further limited due to downsizing of local pineapple production, and an increased use of road freight. In 2004, the trains stopped running and over the next four years the tracks were removed. In 2008, the Yeppoon Railway Station was placed on the permanent heritage register by the Queensland Heritage Council. It is one of the very few railway terminal stations remaining on the Queensland coast, and the building is still in excellent condition.

In 2012, dialogue began between community groups and Rockhampton Regional Council to convert the track formerly occupied by the Yeppoon line into a cycling and hiking trail.

==== Yeppoon Sugar Company ====
The history of the sugar industry on the Capricorn Coast was a short one, commencing in 1883 and ending twenty years later, but its effects still linger today.

The Yeppoon Sugar Company was the brainchild of William Broome who had property a few kilometres north of Yeppoon. Needing investors, he floated the company in 1883, and a crushing mill was subsequently built at Farnborough. The mill relied on other people to do the growing, but sugar was a premium commodity of the day, and landowners followed Broome's lead. Soon there were sugar cane plantations at Farnborough, Cawarral, and Joskeleigh.

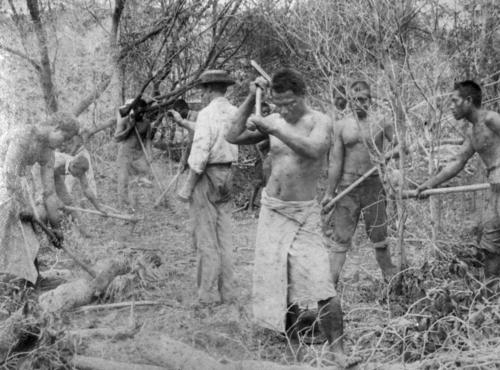
South Sea Island indentured labourers clearing scrub at Farnborough in 1895

Broome's vision collapsed in 1883 due largely to late summer rains. The banks foreclosed, and the business was taken over by the company's Rockhampton backers. They auctioned it promptly at a significant loss to two of the mill's former shareholders. Rutherford Armstrong took the reins of the new venture, renamed the Farnborough Sugar Plantation. He trebled production and several good seasons followed.

In 1896, twenty properties were growing cane at a rate of 21 tons per acre, which was considered good for the industry. However the Depression combined with a low world sugar price and changes to the Pacific Islanders Protection Act, brought the mill to its knees once more. It finally closed its doors in 1903.

As late at 1911, attempts were made by various parties to resurrect the sugar industry with proposals for central mills at Rockhampton and Yeppoon, however people's memories were long, and financier's did not come forth. With no financial guarantorship for a local industry, the Sugar Commission concentrated on building mills in the north of the state, where arguably the climate is more suited to sugar cane.

==== Plight of the Kanakas ====
In the aftermath of the failed Yeppoon sugar industry, the indentured labourers who had worked the cane fields found themselves facing new fears. Freed from service, they were not free in the eyes of the state. Some of the Islanders had been in Australia for decades, and during that time, their rights had dwindled away.

Plantation owners on the Capricorn Coast were not unique in sourcing South Sea Islanders for indentured labour. Indeed, it was the norm, and Yeppoon had a better track record than most, providing adequate food and shelter for the workers, even if they were substantially underpaid. The issue, however was not so much the conditions of employment, as the manner in which the labour was procured.

The idea of using Pacific Islanders in the cane fields was not a random act. Some Islanders had come willingly as early as 1847, and landholders viewed them as more intelligent and better suited to the task than Chinese or Indian labourers. With Queensland's rapid growth however, demand began to outstrip supply, so enterprising ship owners developed new methods for sourcing workers from the Pacific.

From 1863 to 1904, over 62,000 South Sea Islanders were 'blackbirded' to serve as cheap or free labour on Queensland's vast agricultural holdings. Blackbirding meant the recruitment of people through manipulation or simply kidnapping. Essentially it was enslavement. In some instances, entire villages were taken onto ships to work the sugar fields. Conditions aboard ship were notoriously poor with little sanitation or food, and frequent brutality. Many islanders died during their voyages to Australia.

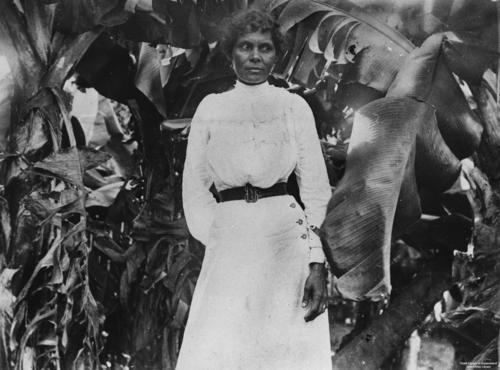
Kanaka woman at Farnborough 1895

The Queensland Government made some attempts to limit the effects of the practice, notably the Polynesian Labourers Act 1868, but the provisions were frequently evaded by unscrupulous ship owners who were paid per head of cargo. The British Navy also patrolled for blackbirding ships, but with little effect. In Queensland, the government faced an uncomfortably quandary; Slavery was illegal but the state needed cheap labour. Hence, in 1880, the British Government implemented the Pacific Islanders' Protection Act 1880 which outlined the minimum standards for importing "indentured labourers". The Act may or may not have helped improve standards aboard ship, as its principal purpose was to license operators and their human cargo.

Later revisions of the Act focused on making it more difficult for the trade to continue rather than the plight of the Islanders themselves. In 1890, the Act was amended for the third time so that no more licences would be issued, however plummeting profits in the sugar industry saw the amendment retracted so the trade in cheap labour could continue. Finally in 1901, the Pacific Island Labourers' Act 1901 was passed. Its purpose was to deport the vast majority of Pacific Islanders working in Australia. A week earlier, the Immigration Restriction Act 1901 was also passed.

Combined, the two Acts prohibited Pacific Islanders from entering the country after 1904, and those who had arrived beforehand had to be licensed. The Acts also provided that from 1906, any Pacific Islander still in Australia could be instantly deported. Further it was illegal to work for pay, which meant that anyone who slipped through the net would not have the means to provide for themselves.

Around ten thousand Islanders were deported, many to the wrong islands. Others however, managed to stay on technicalities. Islanders who had lived in Australia for twenty years were classified as Australian citizens, as were any children born since their arrival. Many whites were sympathetic to the Islanders' plight. In Farnborough, Robert Armstrong, the former manager of the mill, gave employment to some of his former workers to tend his farms, and in the south, Paul Joske and other landholders leased them blocks to grow crops and raise their families. Many Islanders moved onto these blocks, and after Joske's death, the area was renamed Joskeleigh.

The Islanders formed a close-knit community there. They lived in traditional thatched huts and survived by growing vegetables and selling them. Conditions improved, and in 1913, a school was opened in Joskeleigh. The old headmaster's house is now the Joskeleigh Museum, and around thirty Islander families still live in the community. There is also a substantial Islander community in North Rockhampton and throughout the Capricorn Coast.

The term Kanaka (from the French Canaque, and Hawaiian Kanak meaning man), perhaps once derogatory is nowadays worn as a badge of honour. Perhaps for their tenacity and perseverance, the Australian South Sea Islanders achieved an untouchable status, which unfortunately was not afforded to the native Aboriginals of the time. While some Islanders and Aborigines inter-bred at Joskeleigh, the last of the indigenous Darumbals living there were removed by the State in 1930.

As an interesting point of closure to the history of the mill, the manager of Farnborough Sugar Plantation, Rutherford Armstrong, died in 1958 at age 97. In accordance with his expressed wish, his ashes were scattered on the old mill site.

=== Recent history ===
==== World War II ====
During World War 2, around 30,000 US Soldiers were stationed on the Capricorn Coast, most notably at Thompson's Point where efforts by the Capricorn Coast Historical Society are underway to ensure the survival of this piece of history. At nearby Nerimbera is St Christopher's Chapel which was built by US Soldiers during the war, and has been restored to its original condition.

==== Shoalwater Bay ====
With Australia's entry into the Vietnam War, the Australian Army took control of Shoalwater Bay, Townshend Island, and a large tract abutting Byfield for use as a military training facility. This area was named the Shoalwater Bay Military Training Area. In 1966, the last civilians vacated their holdings there. While the "military invasion" of the pristine wilderness area was unpopular with many, some humanitarian observers saw the eviction of white landowners as ironic justice for their ancestors' eviction of the Aboriginal population a century before.

==== Iwasaki resort ====
In 1971, a Japanese syndicate headed by Yohachiro Iwasaki acquired hundreds of thousands of hectares of beachfront land including wetlands in Farnborough to build a resort. The acquisition caused widespread outrage, given that Australian citizens and developers had been refused to buy the land on several occasions prior, and also due to the belief that the deal was corrupted by kickbacks at the Queensland Government level.

Anti-Japanese sentiment ran rife including the printing of fake money featuring Mr Iwasaki's caricatured face with a currency value of 4 Grabs, a play on the term "up for grabs". When construction began, the Yeppoon RSL club posted an anti-Japanese display on their lawns. Local discontent reached its climax on 29 November 1980, the day of the Queensland Election, when a bomb was set off at Iwasaki Resort. Two men were charged but acquitted.

The project continued regardless. Originally known as the Iwasaki Resort, it later became the Capricorn International Resort. Rydges managed the resort until 2011, when the lease was taken over by Mercure.

Closed in 2016, the resort currently only operates one of its two golf courses. A skeleton admin staff are still in place, however all accommodation and resort facilities are unavailable to the public.

Looking for redevelopment approval, a draft EIS being prepared by proponent for a:

- 300-room, five-star resort, including a golf course
- caravan and recreational vehicle park
- Wagyu cattle farm - for farm stays, cattle and sheep farming and educational activities
- residential community of 8000 dwellings and village centre
- conservation precinct
- airstrip - for tourism, charter flights and a potential fly-in, fly-out hub
- refurbishment of the existing 331-room Mercure Capricorn Resort (independent of EIS process).

The redevelopment is expected to create 8500 during the construction phase over approximately 20 years and 2160 when operational.

== Facilities and infrastructure ==
One marked distinction from other regions along the tropical Queensland coast is that the Capricorn Coast community is more focused on quality of lifestyle rather than tourism.

The impact of mining aside, the economy and industry of the Capricorn Coast is diverse, ranging from crops, fishing, and grazing to manufacturing and resources.

Notably, on the northern fringe of the Capricorn Coast, 454,000 hectares (1,120,000 acres) at Shoalwater Bay is managed and utilised by the Australian Army for military training. The Shoalwater Bay Military Training Area (SBMTA) frequently sees deployments of in excess of 30,000 troops, plus annual training exercises with the Singapore Armed Forces and bi-annual Talisman Sabre exercises with the US Military.

In addition, many of the islands along the coast are used for scientific research in marine biology as well as environmental studies. These fields of research bring people from all around the world.

=== Health services ===
The Capricorn Coast is currently served by local general practices, Capricorn Coast Hospital (formerly Yeppoon Hospital) and Mater Yeppoon.

The Capricorn Coast Hospital is Located on 8 Hoskyn Drive Yeppoon QLD 4703. The Capricorn Coast Is also Accompanied by Capricorn Coast Community Dental Clinic.

Child and Adolescent Oral Health Service and Yeppoon Alcohol and Other Drugs Services.

=== Emergency and disaster response ===
Capricorn Coast is well supported by a number of emergency services groups and government agencies. The Coastguard has three bases on the Capricorn Coast at Keppel Sands, Yeppoon, and Stanage Bay (Thirsty Sound). The Capricorn Helicopter Rescue is based in Rockhampton and has an operational range extending from Maryborough to Mackay. The Queensland Ambulance Service has staffed stations in Emu Park and Yeppoon.

The Queensland Police Service have stations that service the Capricorn Coast at Emu Park, Yeppoon, and Lakes Creek (suburb of North Rockhampton). Queensland Fire and Rescue has permanently staffed stations in Emu Park and Yeppoon. The Royal Flying Doctor Service is based at Rockhampton Airport and services all of Central Queensland.

The Rural Fire Service has Wardens based in Adelaide Park, Barmoya, Bondoola, Bowenia, Bungundarra, Byfield, Canal Creek, Cawarral, Cooberie, Coowonga, Emu Park, Great Keppel Island, Hidden Valley, Keppel Sands, Maryvale, Nankin, Nerimbera, Stockyard Point, Tanby, Woodbury, Yeppoon. The State Emergency Service responds in time of emergency and disaster. The SES has groups based in Emu Park, Great Keppel Island, Keppel Sands, Yeppoon, and Stanage. Yeppoon Water Police is based at Rosslyn Bay. They patrol Keppel Bay and respond to emergencies in the region.

=== Education ===
Capricorn Coast has a number of primary and secondary schools, both private and public.

State primary schools

- Byfield State School
- Cawarral State School
- Emu Park State School State School
- Farnborough State School
- Keppel Sands State School State School
- Taranganba State School
- Yeppoon State School

State secondary schools

- Yeppoon State High School
- North Rockhampton State High School (students living approximately south of Coowonga)

Private schools

- Sacred Heart School, Yeppoon (Years Prep to 7)
- St Benedict's School, Pacific Heights (Years Prep to 7)
- St Brendan's College, Yeppoon (Years 8 to 12)
- St Ursula's College, Yeppoon (Years 8 to 12)

Tertiary colleges

- CQ University, Yeppoon campus (formerly CQ Tafe)

== Environment ==
=== Environmental protests and concerns ===
- 1994 Shoalwater Bay: Shoalwater Bay was the site for a conservation battle over sand mining in near-pristine wilderness, which was won by environmentalists, including Peter Garrett. The federal government followed an inquiry's finding against the proposal and blocked the development in September 1994.
- 2009 Shoalwater Bay: In June and July 2009, organised protests began throughout Queensland against the Talisman Saber exercises to be conducted at Shoalwater Bay.
- 2011 Shoalwater Bay: In 2011, three protesters were charged for trespassing in the Shoalwater Bay Military Training Area, while another man attacked a Tiger helicopter at Rockhampton Airport with an axe.
- 2011 Balaclava Island: The proposed coal terminal on Balaclava Island and subsequent dredging near the mouth of the Fitzroy River is causing new concerns for conservation groups for fear of its effects on marine life and the health of the Great Barrier Reef.

== Tourism and activities ==
After a ten-year downturn in tourism the Capricorn Coast has seen a number of its large resorts close. Although, there are still many other accommodation options to choose from. A recent foreshore redevelopment maybe the saving grace of what's been a serious struggle to attract tourists to the coast. The recently constructed Yeppoon Lagoon is a 2,500-square-metre (27,000 sq ft) Bali style pool, includes a shallow children's play area, an informal lap swimming area and a swim-up infinity edge with panoramic views. Free for public use, it features day facilities including BBQ's.

A short walk north along the main beach foreshore is the Keppel Kracken, a free-to-access water play feature on the Yeppoon foreshore, with sea creature sculptures in the zero-depth wet area. Featuring interactive elements including water cannons, jets and an umbrella bucket, the Keppel Kraken is a popular vacation destination for families with young kids.

In the heart of Yeppoon is Bayview Towers.

At the southern end of the Capricorn Coast is Zilzie Bay Great Barrier Reef Resort, a sprawling complex located south of Emu Park (closed as at 2016). Boasting a waterless golf course, provided no accommodation in its first stage. Recent news reports have suggested that a Chinese investor has purchased the building, golf course and surrounding land.

Central to the Capricorn Coast and the 27 islands offshore is Keppel Bay Marina at Rosslyn Bay, a popular port of call for "yachties" with 400 floating marina berths catering for vessels up to 35 metres in length. Rosslyn Bay also offers fine dining, maintained parklands, and short-and-longterm accommodation.

The main resort on Great Keppel Island has been closed for ten years, and has been long awaiting redevelopment. Currently the old resort shell is being demolished and taken away as per the lease conditions because the 162-hectare land holding has been listed for sale. The adjoining 600-hectare land on the island has environmental approvals for freehold villas.

Alternative accommodation and camping is still available. Fast-Cats depart regularly from Rosslyn Bay, and day-trippers are welcome on the island.

At the southern end of the Great Barrier Reef, beyond the traditional scope of the region are Heron Island and Lady Elliot Island, which provide snorkelling and diving opportunities and are accessible from Gladstone. Lady Musgrave Island is uninhabited but overnight camping is permitted.

The community based tourism website Yeppoon, Capricorn Coast, features all the Capricorn Coast has to offer and is growing every day. After a ten-year downturn in tourism the town was lacking the publicity needed to get the coast back on the map for travellers. After a public scolding on social media from those disappointed by a lack of support the tax/ratepayer funded local tourism body offered coastal businesses (by only focusing on paid members) a small group of community members took matters into their own hands and created a comprehensive site about the coast. The site also has a growing social media presence (Facebook & Instagram).

== See also ==
- Regions of Queensland
