= Lammermoor, Queensland =

Lammermoor
- Suburb
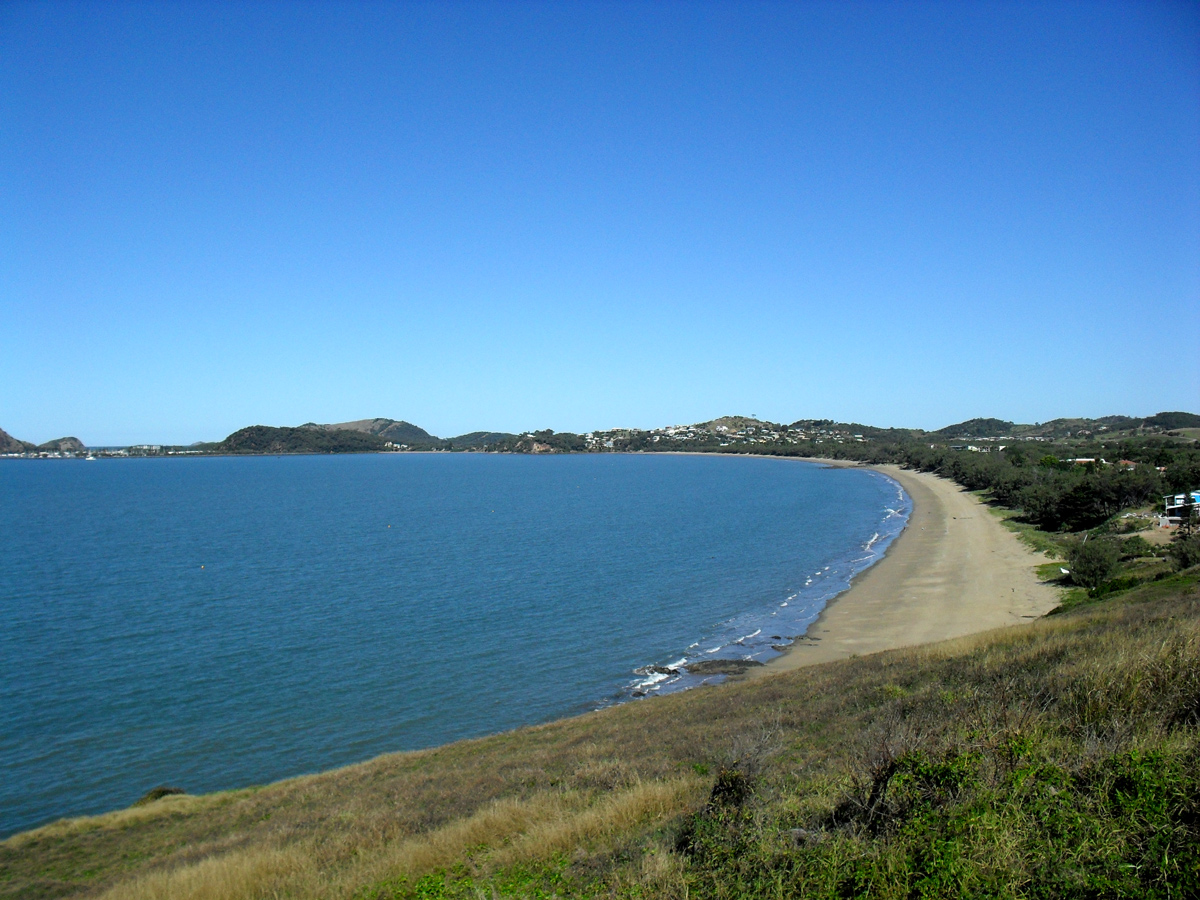
- Lammermoor Beach, looking south from Wreck Point, 2011

- Interactive map of Lammermoor
- Coordinates: 23.1561°S 150.7725°E
- Country: Australia
- State: Queensland
- Region: Central Queensland
- LGA: Shire of Livingstone
- Location: 6.5 km (4.0 mi) SE of Yeppoon; 17.2 km (10.7 mi) NNW of Emu Park; 45.7 km (28.4 mi) NE of Rockhampton; 660 km (410 mi) NNW of Brisbane

Government
  - State electorate: Keppel
  - Federal division: Capricornia

Area
  - Total: 10.7 km^{2} (4.1 sq mi)

Population
  - Total: 2,551 (2021 census)
  - Density: 238.4/km^{2} (617.5/sq mi)
- Time zone: UTC+10:00 (AEST)
- Postcode: 4703
Suburbs around Lammermoor
Taranganba	Cooee Bay	Coral Sea
Taroomball	Lammermoor	Rosslyn
Taroomball	Taroomball	Causeway Lake

Lammermoor is a coastal locality on the Capricorn Coast in the Livingstone Shire, Queensland, Australia. In the 2021 census, Lammermoor had a population of 2,551 people.

== Geography ==
Lammermoor is beside the Coral Sea overlooking Keppel Bay, and is centrally located on the Capricorn Coast, 6.5 kilometres (4.0 mi) by road south-east of Yeppoon and 17.2 kilometres (10.7 mi) by road north-north-west of Emu Park. Unusually, the suburb is not bounded by the coastline but extends over 5 kilometres (3.1 mi) offshore; this is also the case for a number of other coastal suburbs.

Lammermoor Beach is a long sandy beach (23.1559°S 150.7677°E).

Statue Rock (23.1641°S 150.7777°E) and Statue Bay (23.1646°S 150.7813°E) are offshore at the southern end of the beach.

The Scenic Highway is the main drive for locals and tourists which passes by the beach of Lammermoor.

Lammermoor is a steadily growing community. Several major land developments in Tarranganba and the neighbouring localities of Lammermoor and Taroombal are filling quickly with demand from the mining boom.

Many residents of Lammermoor work in Rockhampton City and live on the coast.

== History ==
Lammermoor is part of the traditional lands of the Darumbal peoples.

Sacred Heart Catholic Primary School opened in 1958.

Prior to local government amalgamations in 2008, the Capricorn Coast was administered by Livingstone Shire Council. From 2008 to 2013, it was part of Rockhampton Region. In 2014, the Shire of Livingstone was re-established and now administers Lammermoor.

== Demographics ==
In the 2011 census, Lammermoor had a population of 1,316 people.

In the 2016 census, Lammermoor had a population of 2,167 people.

In the 2021 census, Lammermoor had a population of 2,551 people.

== Education ==
Sacred Heart Catholic Primary School is a Catholic primary (Prep-6) school for boys and girls at 14 Barracuda Crescent (23.1584°S 150.7662°E). In 2018, the school had an enrolment of 388 students with 29 teachers (24 full-time equivalent) and 17 non-teaching staff (8 full-time equivalent).

There are no government schools in Lammermoor. The nearest government primary school is Taranganba State School in neighbouring Taranganba to the north-west. The nearest government secondary school is Yeppoon State High School in Yeppoon to the north-west.
