= Causeway Lake, Queensland =

Causeway Lake
- Suburb
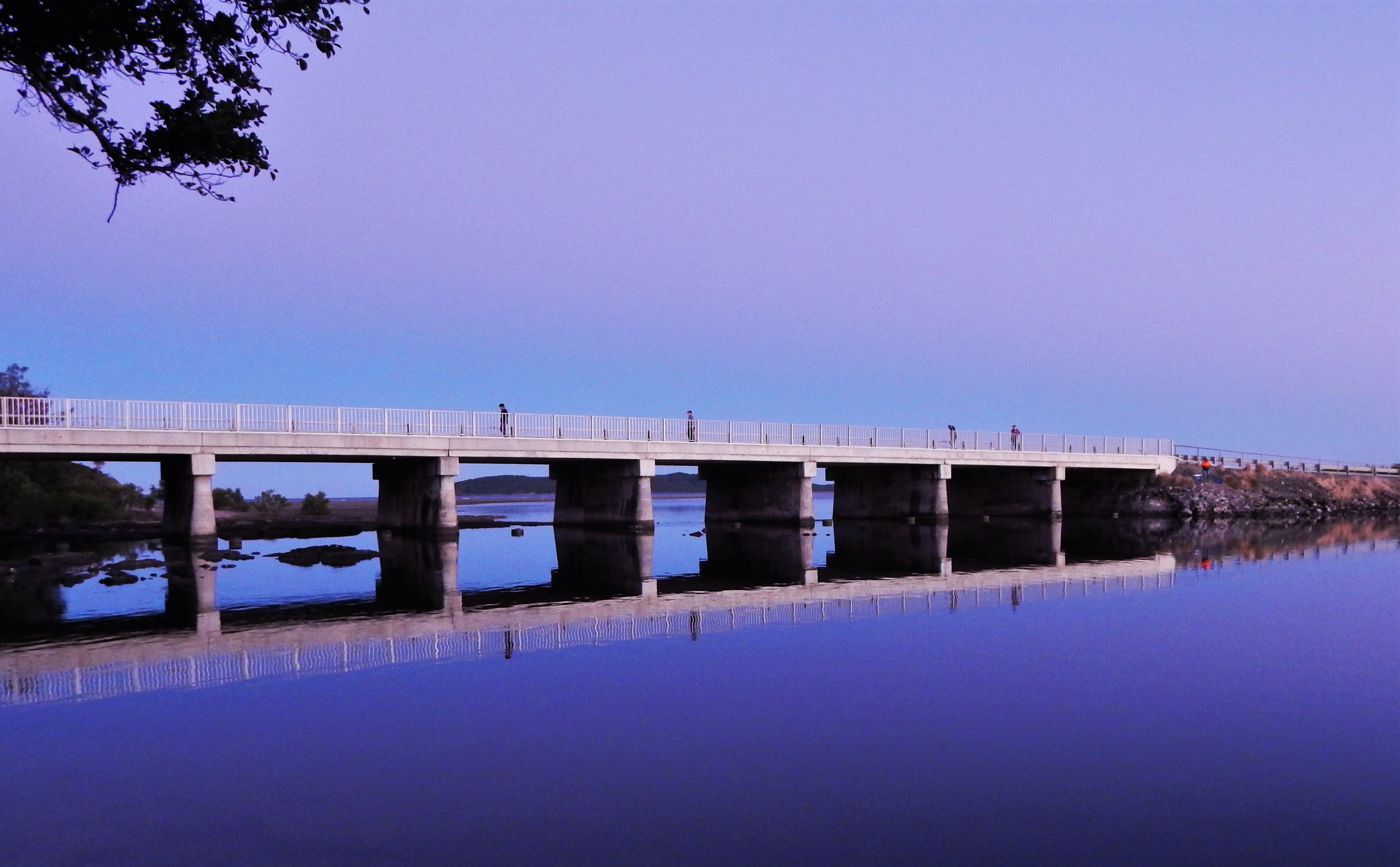
- Causeway Lake crossing, 2014

- Interactive map of Causeway Lake
- Coordinates: 23.1994°S 150.7961°E
- Country: Australia
- State: Queensland
- LGA: Shire of Livingstone
- Location: 9.4 km (5.8 mi) NNW of Emu Park; 11.6 km (7.2 mi) SE of Yeppoon; 49.5 km (30.8 mi) NW of Rockhampton; 681 km (423 mi) N of Brisbane

Government
  - State electorate: Keppel
  - Federal division: Capricornia

Area
  - Total: 10.2 km^{2} (3.9 sq mi)

Population
  - Total: 121 (2021 census)
  - Density: 11.86/km^{2} (30.72/sq mi)
- Time zone: UTC+10:00 (AEST)
- Postcode: 4703
Suburbs around Causeway Lake
Taroomball	Rosslyn	Mulambin
Tanby	Causeway Lake	Coral Sea
Tanby	Tanby	Kinka Beach

Causeway Lake is a coastal locality on the Capricorn Coast in the Livingstone Shire, Queensland, Australia. In the 2021 census, Causeway Lake had a population of 121 people.

== Geography ==
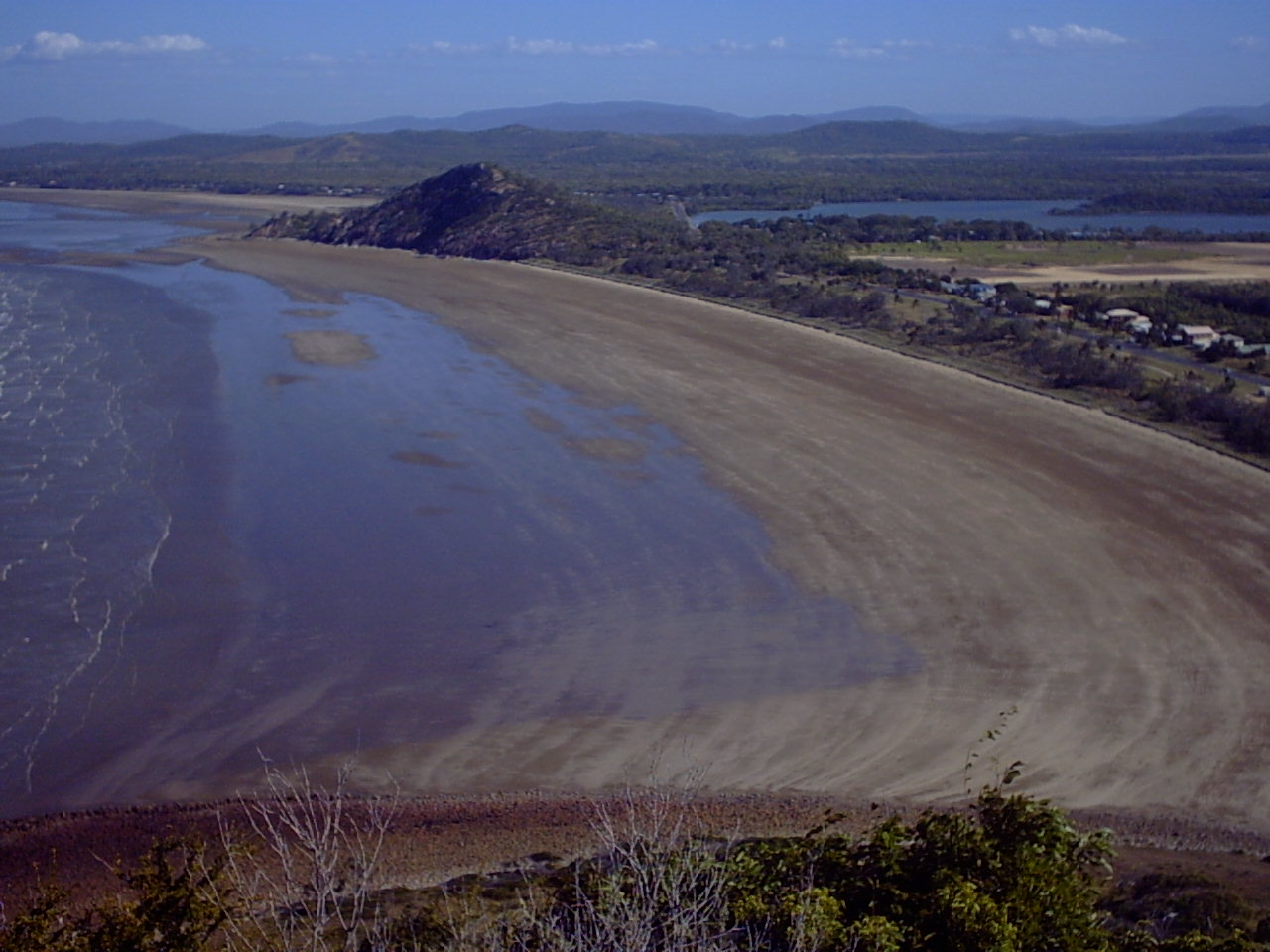
Looking along Mulambin Beach with Causeway lake in the background, 2009

The locality takes its name from the lake of the same name which lies within the locality, both of which take their name from the causeway (and smallbridge) which allows the Scenic Highway to cross the lake's narrow entrance to the Coral Sea.

There is very little development within the locality except for a small residential area on the north-eastern shore of the lake where there is also public parkland access to the lake for recreation. Apart from that, most of the locality is undeveloped being taken up with the lakes and the associated palustrine wetland surrounding the numerous creeks which flow into the lake.

The northern mouth of the lake is part of the Capricorn Coast National Park. The southern part of the locality is within the Causeway Lake Conservation Park.

== History ==
The Scenic Highway crossing over Causeway Lake was constructed in 1939, allowing motorists to travel between Yeppoon and Emu Park.

After a near-drowning of an 8-year-old girl at Causeway Lake in June 1951, Livingstone Shire Council erected warning signs the following month advising of the potential dangers associated with the lake.

A 15-year-old boy drowned in the lake in January 1952 after his clothes became entangled in the propeller shaft of the outboard motor aboard his boat.

A five-year-old boy drowned in the lake in February 1954. After noticing him disappear, a 15-year-old girl retrieved him from the water prior to an honorary ambulance officer attempting resuscitation without success.

Despite it having been a much-discussed topic in the local community, the issue of potentially dredging Causeway Lake remains an ongoing concern for local residents, recreational users of the lake and environmental agencies.

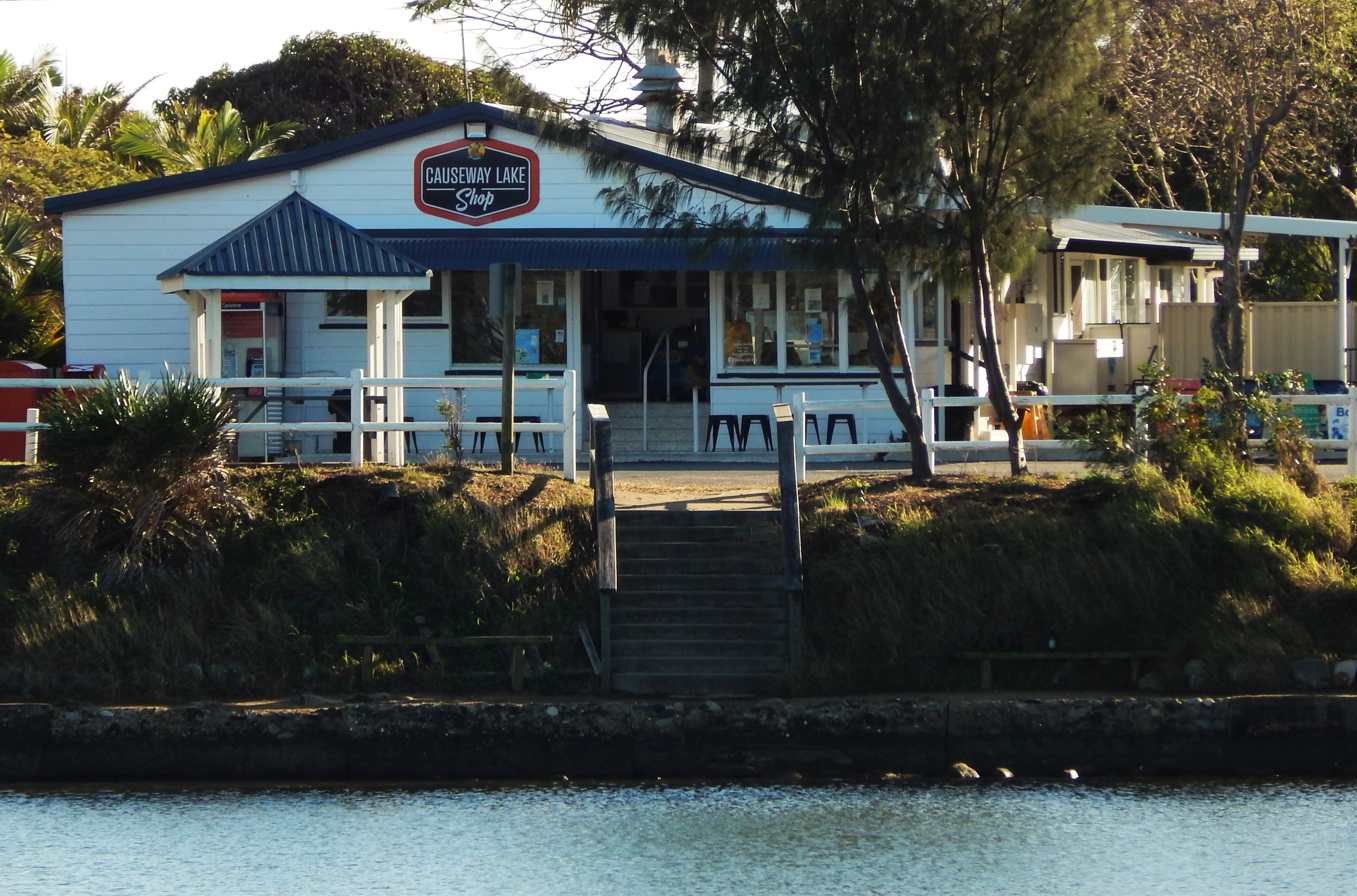
Causeway Lake Shop (formerly Causeway Lake Kiosk), 2022

A local fish and chip shop which fronts the lake, the Causeway Lake Kiosk, received some publicity in 2017 following a visit by One Nation leader Pauline Hanson who worked in the shop for a day, in an attempt to bring attention to the issue of high electricity prices. Hanson denied it was a ploy to win votes prior to the state election.

A house fire which occurred in August 2018 caused structural damage to the neighbouring Causeway Lake Kiosk. However, the business re-opened the following day and began accepting donations for the family whose home was destroyed by the fire.

== Demographics ==
In the 2016 census, Causeway Lake had a population of 121 people.

In the 2021 census, Causeway Lake had a population of 121 people.

== Education ==
There are no schools in Causeway Lake. The nearest government primary school is Taranganba State School in Taranganba to the north. The nearest government secondary school is Yeppoon State High School in Yeppoon to the north.

== Amenities ==
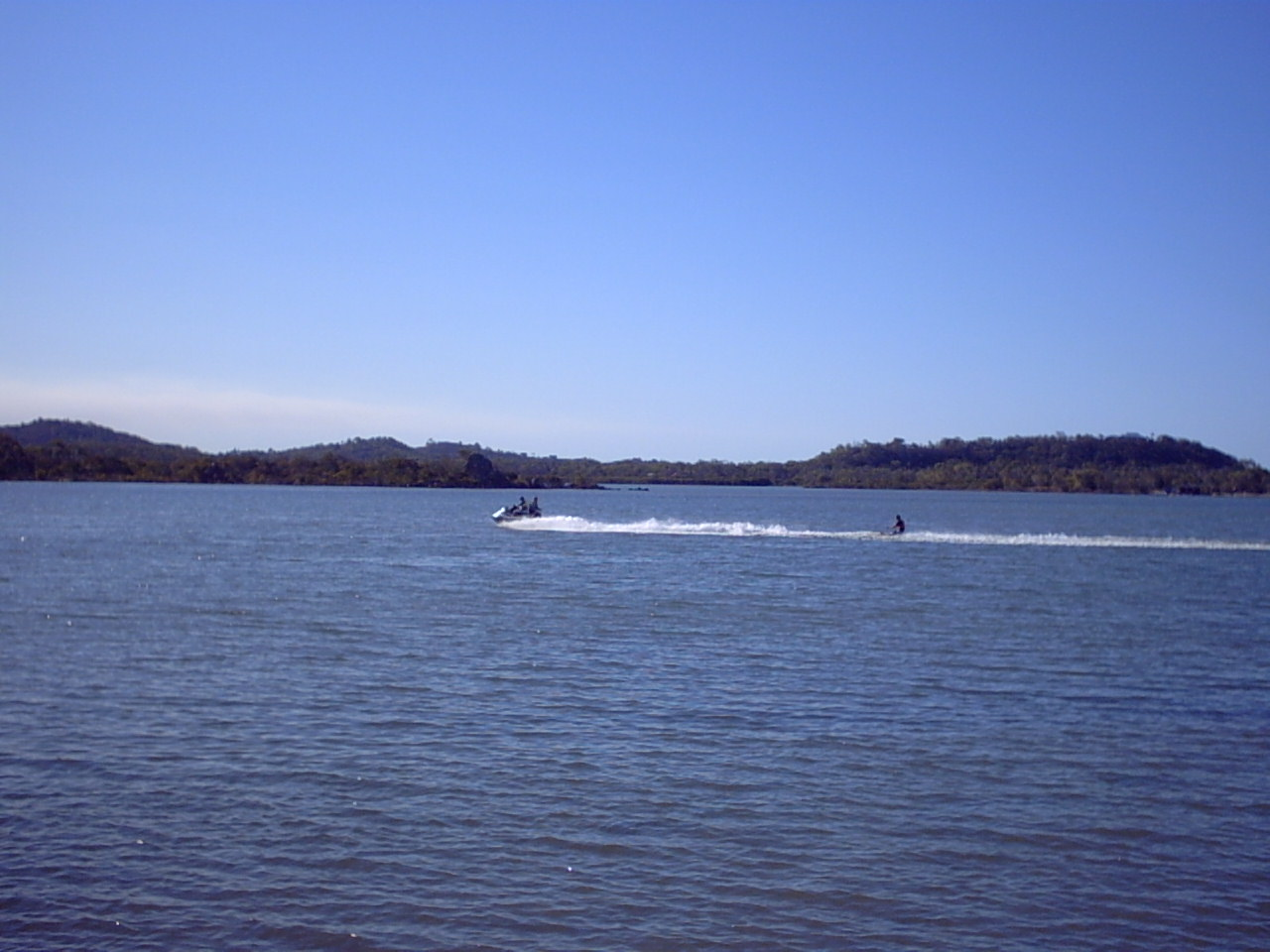
Watersports on the lake, 2009

The lake is popular for fishing and watersports. There are picnic and barbeque facilities, as well as a shop.
