= Cooee Bay =

- Suburb
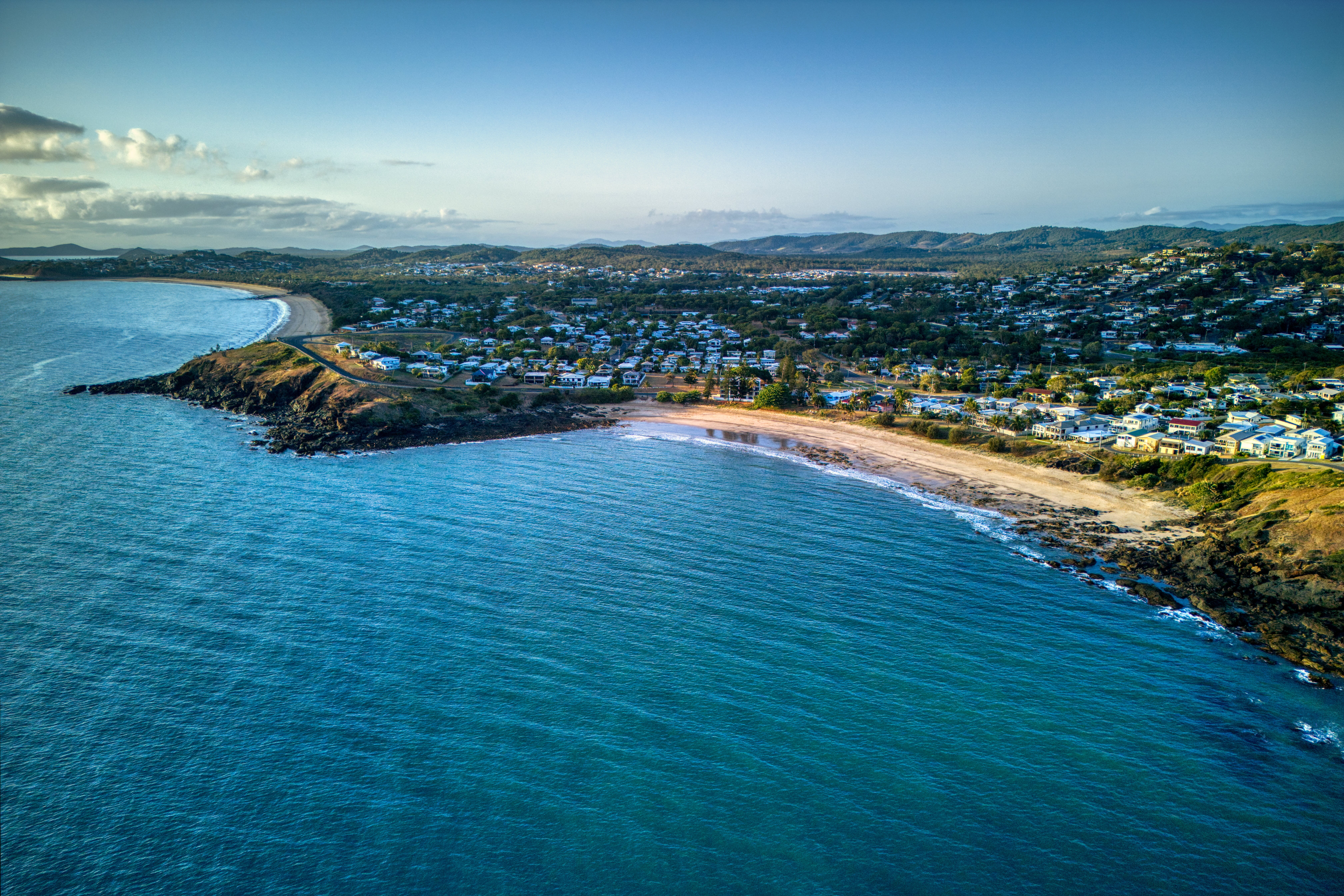
- Beach at Cooee Bay, 2024

- Interactive map of Cooee Bay
- Coordinates: 23.1422°S 150.7594°E
- Country: Australia
- State: Queensland
- LGA: Shire of Livingstone
- Location: 3.2 km (2.0 mi) SE of Yeppoon; 42.5 km (26.4 mi) NE of Rockhampton; 683 km (424 mi) NNW of Brisbane

Government
  - State electorate: Keppel
  - Federal division: Capricornia

Area
  - Total: 8.4 km^{2} (3.2 sq mi)

Population
  - Total: 942 (2021 census)
  - Density: 112.1/km^{2} (290.4/sq mi)
- Time zone: UTC+10:00 (AEST)
- Postcode: 4703
Suburbs around Cooee Bay
Yeppoon	Coral Sea	Coral Sea
Taranganba	Cooee Bay	Coral Sea
Taranganba	Taranganba	Lammermoor

Cooee Bay is a coastal locality in the Livingstone Shire, Queensland, Australia. In the 2021 census, Cooee Bay had a population of 942 people.

== Geography ==
Cooee Bay is bounded to the east by the Coral Sea. It is centrally located on the Capricorn Coast, two kilometres south of Yeppoon, and 17 kilometres (11 mi) north of Emu Park.

Like its neighbouring suburb Taranganba, Cooee Bay is separated from Yeppoon by Ross Creek, a popular fishing location.

Cooee Bay has the following headlands (from north to south):

- Wave Point (23.1387°S 150.7578°E)
- Keppel Outlook (23.1390°S 150.7590°E)
- Wreck Point (23.1440°S 150.7643°E)

These headlands create a number of small bays (from north to south):

- Yeppoon Inlet at the mouth of Ross Creek (23.1362°S 150.7515°E)
- Fishermans Bay (23.1375°S 150.7533°E) south of the mount of Ross Creek
- Brumms Cove (23.1388°S 150.7583°E) between Wave Point and Keppel Outlook
- Cooee Bay (23.1409°S 150.7605°E) south of Keppel Outlook

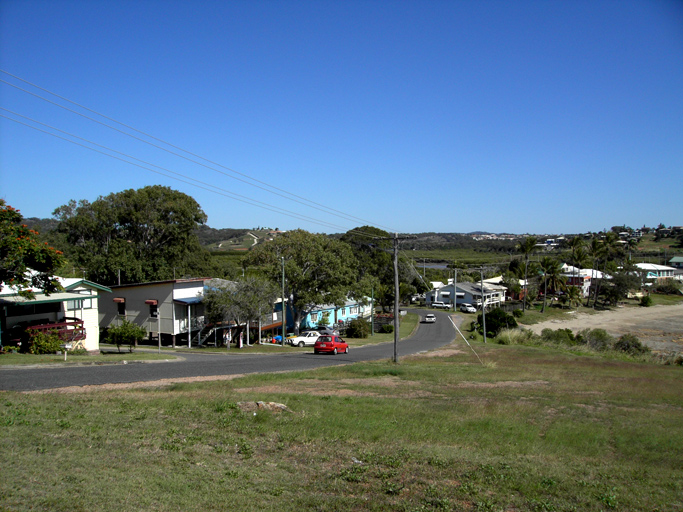
Housing at Cooee Bay, 2011

Matthew Flinders Drive is an alternative tourist deviation from the Scenic Highway, which travels up to Wreck Point. From the lookout, the visitor can enjoy views to Byfield, Great Keppel Island, and Rosslyn.

Offshore to the east is the locality of The Keppels which contain the Great Keppel Islands and a number of other islands.

== History ==
Cooee Bay Post Office opened on 18 September 1961 by Don and Edna Schabe who had previously owned the Cooee Bay General Store. There is a memorial to Don Schabe in the park for his contribution to the Cooee Bay Progress Association. Prior to the opening of the post office, a receiving office had been open from 1894. The post office closed in 1977.

During World War 2, Cooee Bay was heavily occupied by the US Army.

Prior to local government amalgamations in 2008, the Capricorn Coast was administered by Livingstone Shire Council. From 2008 to 2013 it was administered by Rockhampton Region. From 1 January 2014, the Shire of Livingstone was restored and now administers Cooee Bay.

== Demographics ==
In the 2006 census, Cooee Bay had a population of 1,275 people.

In the 2016 census, Cooee Bay had a population of 913 people.

In the 2021 census, Cooee Bay had a population of 942 people.

== Education ==
There are no schools in Cooee Bay. The nearest government primary school is Taranganba State School in neighbouring Taranganba to the south. The nearest government secondary school is Yeppoon State High School in neighbouring Yeppoon to the north-west.

== See also ==
- Capricorn Coast
