= Mulambin, Queensland =

Mulambin
- Town
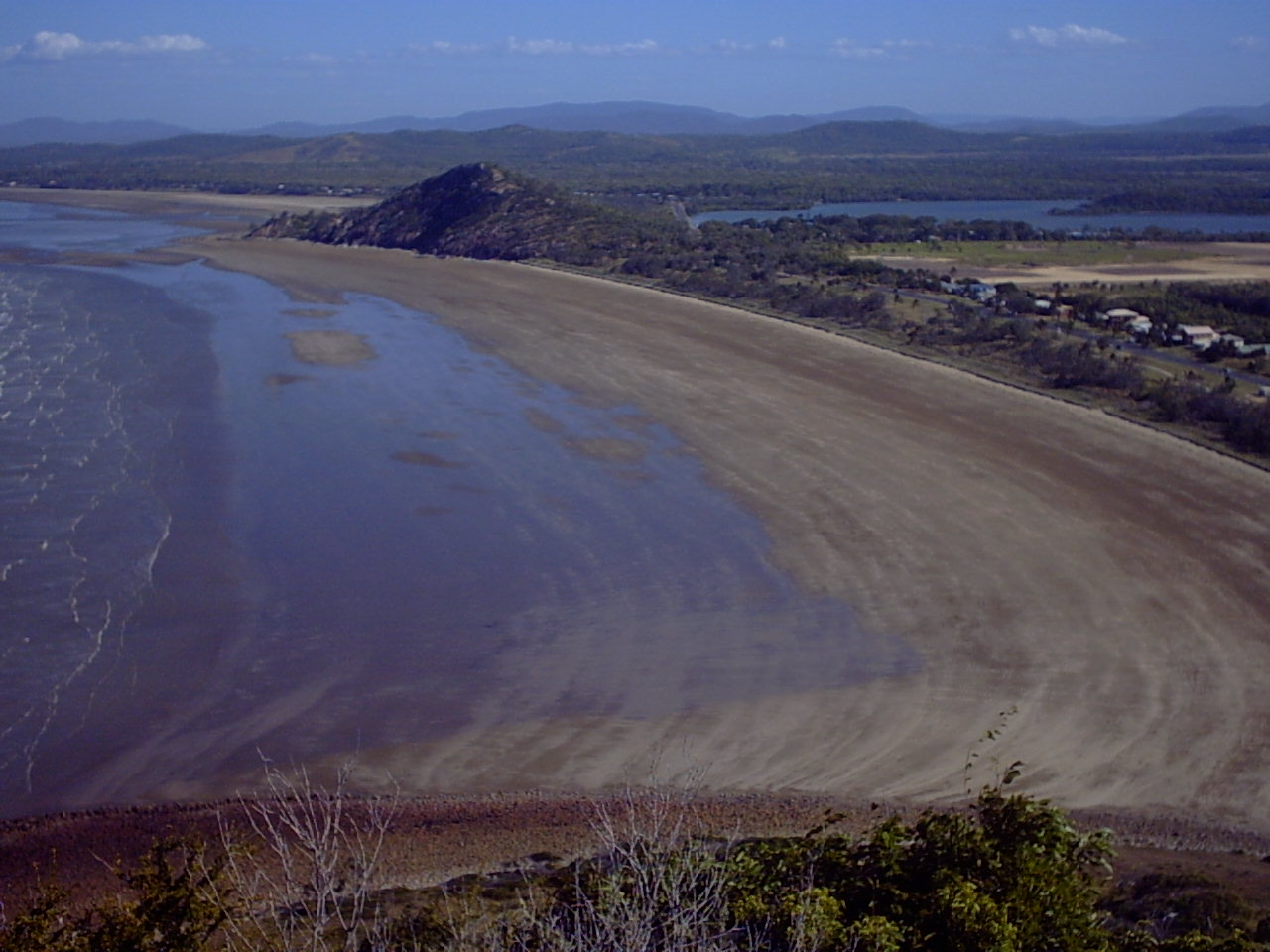
- Mulambin Beach with Causeway Lake in the background, 2009

- Interactive map of Mulambin
- Coordinates: 23.1977°S 150.7886°E
- Country: Australia
- State: Queensland
- LGA: Shire of Livingstone
- Location: 10.2 km (6.3 mi) NNW of Emu Park; 11.1 km (6.9 mi) SE of Yeppoon; 50.0 km (31.1 mi) NE of Rockhampton; 690 km (430 mi) NNW of Brisbane

Government
  - State electorate: Keppel
  - Federal division: Capricornia

Area
  - Total: 5.7 km^{2} (2.2 sq mi)

Population
  - Total: 917 (2021 census)
  - Density: 160.9/km^{2} (417/sq mi)
- Time zone: UTC+10:00 (AEST)
- Postcode: 4703
Localities around Mulambin
Rosslyn	Rosslyn	Rosslyn
Causeway Lake	Mulambin	Coral Sea
Causeway Lake	Causeway Lake	Causeway Lake

Mulambin is a coastal town and locality in the Livingstone Shire, Queensland, Australia. In the 2021 census, the locality of Mulambin had a population of 917 people.

== Geography ==
The eastern boundary of Mulambin is the beach fronting onto the Coral Sea. The Scenic Highway runs from the north to the south as an esplanade between the beach and the residential area. The western boundary is loosely aligned to Mulambin Creek which flows from the north to the south into Causeway Lake. The western part of the locality is largely undeveloped freehold land.

== Demographics ==
In the 2016 census, the locality of Mulambin had a population of 921 people.

In the 2021 census, the locality of Mulambin had a population of 917 people.

== Education ==
There are no schools in the locality of Mulambin. The nearest government primary school is Taranganba State School in Taranganba to the north-west. The nearest government secondary school is Yeppoon State High School in Yeppoon to the north-west.
