= Capricorn Coast Hospital =

- Queensland Health
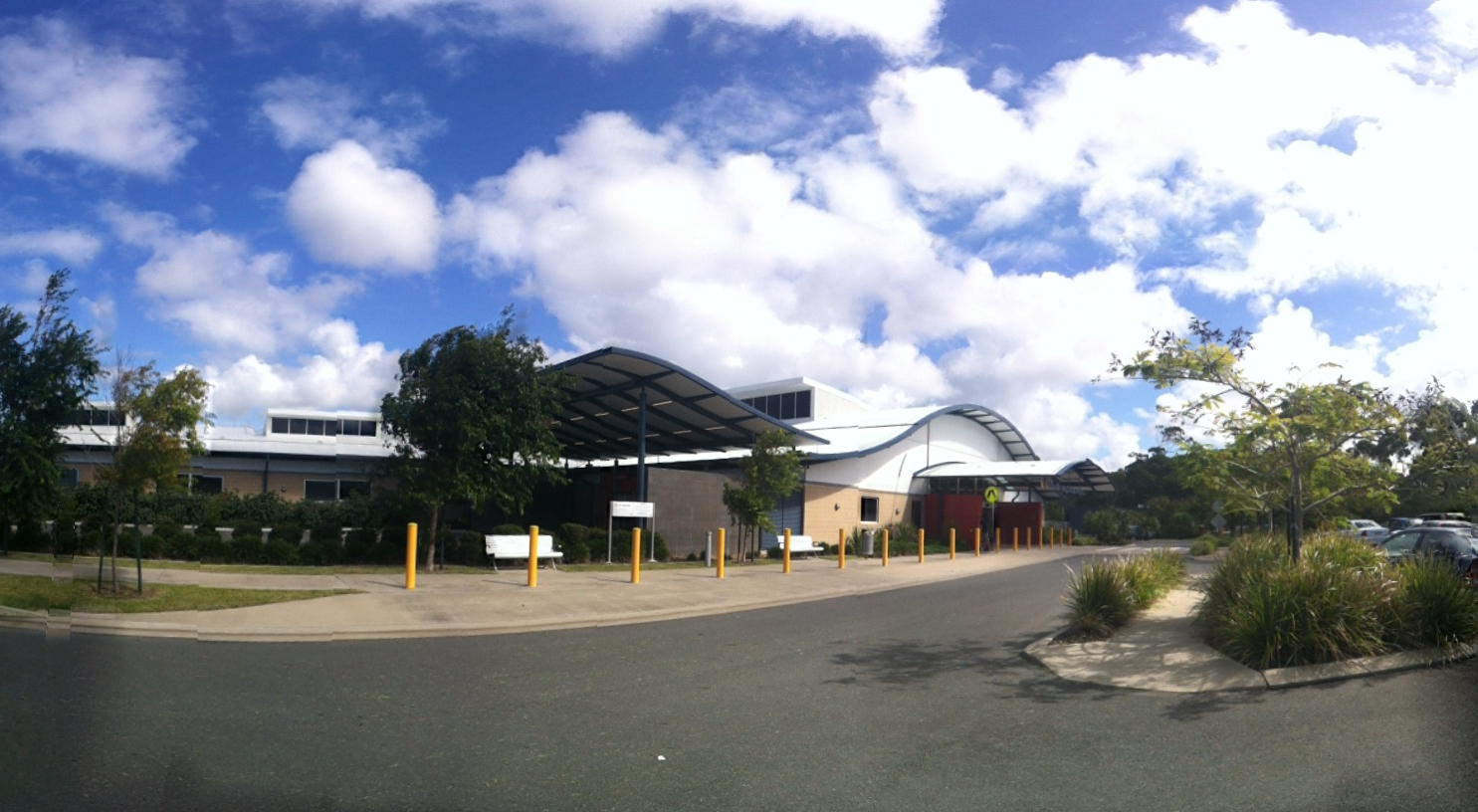

Geography
- Location: Yeppoon, Central Queensland, Queensland, Australia
- Coordinates: 23°8′39.44″S 150°44′1.07″E

Organisation
- Care system: Public Medicare (AU)
- Type: District

Services
- Emergency department: Yes (6 Beds, 2 Recovery Beds)
- Beds: 22

Helipads
- Helipad: No

History
- Founded: 8 February 2010

Links
- Website: www.health.qld.gov.au/services/central-queensland/cap-coast
- Lists: Hospitals in Australia

The Capricorn Coast Hospital and Health Service (CCH&HS) is a public hospital in Yeppoon, Queensland, Australia which serves the Capricorn Coast district spanning 150 kilometres from end to end.

== History ==
The hospital was opened on the 8 February 2010 and cost $21.5 million to build. It houses 22 inpatient beds and two full-time doctors.

In August 2023, concerns were raised by the Nurses' Professional Association of Queensland over the decision to withdraw services from the hospital such as blood collection and wound dressing in an attempt by the Central Queensland Hospital and Health Service District to reduce its budget by $2 million.

According to the NPAQ, the Capricorn Coast Hospital in 2023 was treating up to 20,000 cases per annum in its emergency department with an occupancy rate of 95% but there continued to be no designated triage nurse at the hospital which was contributing to lengthy wait times and ambulance ramping. They also raised concerns about the need to transfer patients to Rockhampton and a lack of security.

However, according to the Central Queensland Hospital and Health Service, several tools were being used to determine priorities and the best allocation of available resources.

== Services ==
Capricorn Coast Hospital is considered to be in an Inner Regional Area (RA2) as per the ASGC Remoteness Areas. The Capricorn Coast Health service provides;

- emergency,
- acute inpatient services,
- rehabilitation,
- palliative care,
- residential aged care,
- women and family health programs,
- adult health programs,
- mental health programs and
- oral health services to the community.

== See also ==
- Capricorn Coast
