= Scenic Highway (Queensland) =

Road in Queensland, Australia

Scenic Highway (Queensland) Queensland
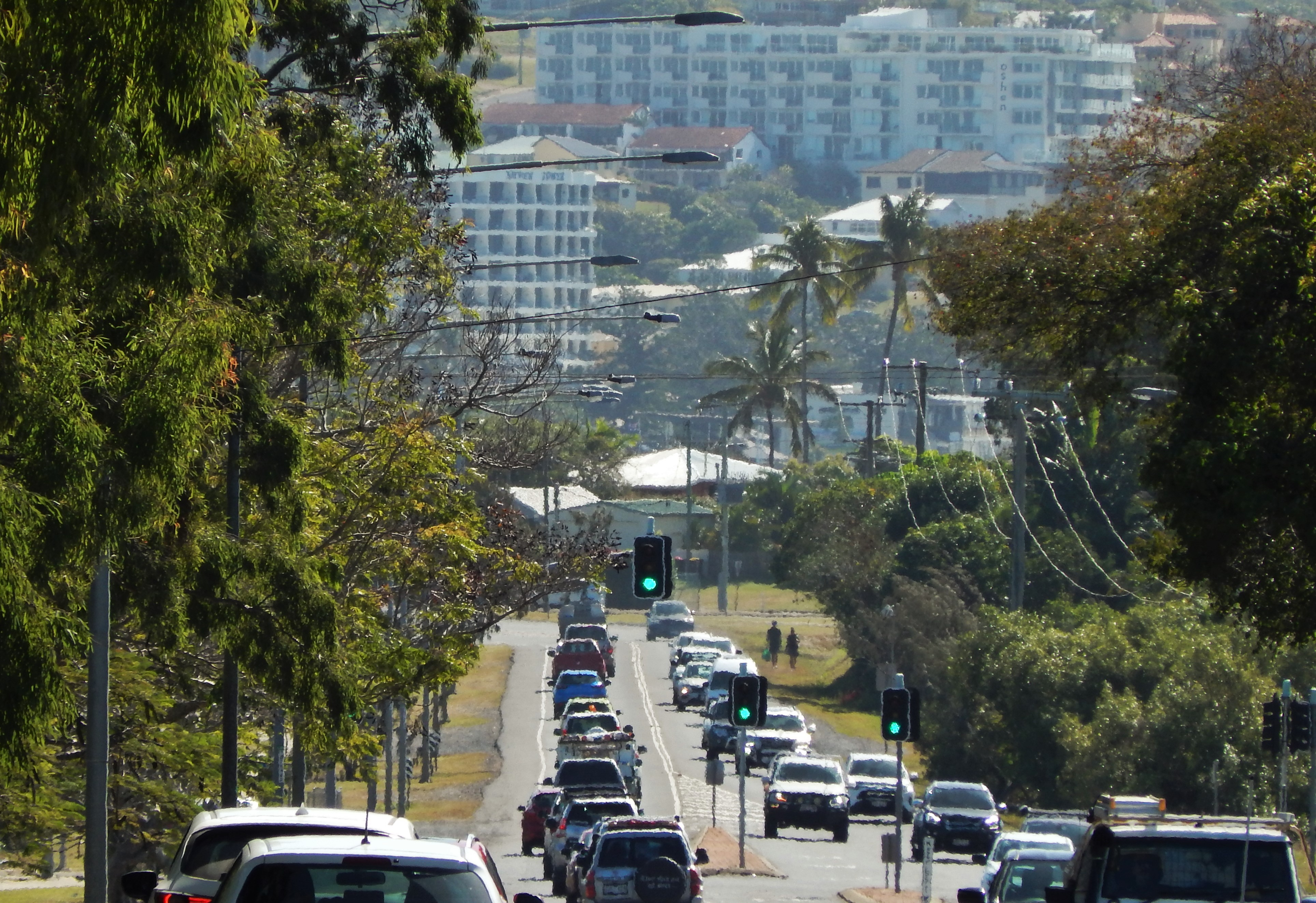
- Scenic Highway near Yeppoon, 2022

General information
- Type: Highway
- Length: 20 km (12 mi)
- Route number(s): State Route 4 / Tourist Route 10

Major junctions
- North end: Yeppoon Road (State Route 4 / Tourist Route 10), Yeppoon
- South end: Hill Street (State Route 4 / Tourist Route 10), Emu Park

Location(s)
- Major settlements: Cooee Bay, Taranganba, Lammermoor, Rosslyn, Kinka Beach

Highway system
- Highways in Australia; National Highway • Freeways in Australia; Highways in Queensland

The Scenic Highway is a coastal highway from Yeppoon to Emu Park, both on the Capricorn Coast in the Shire of Livingstone, Queensland, Australia.

== Route ==
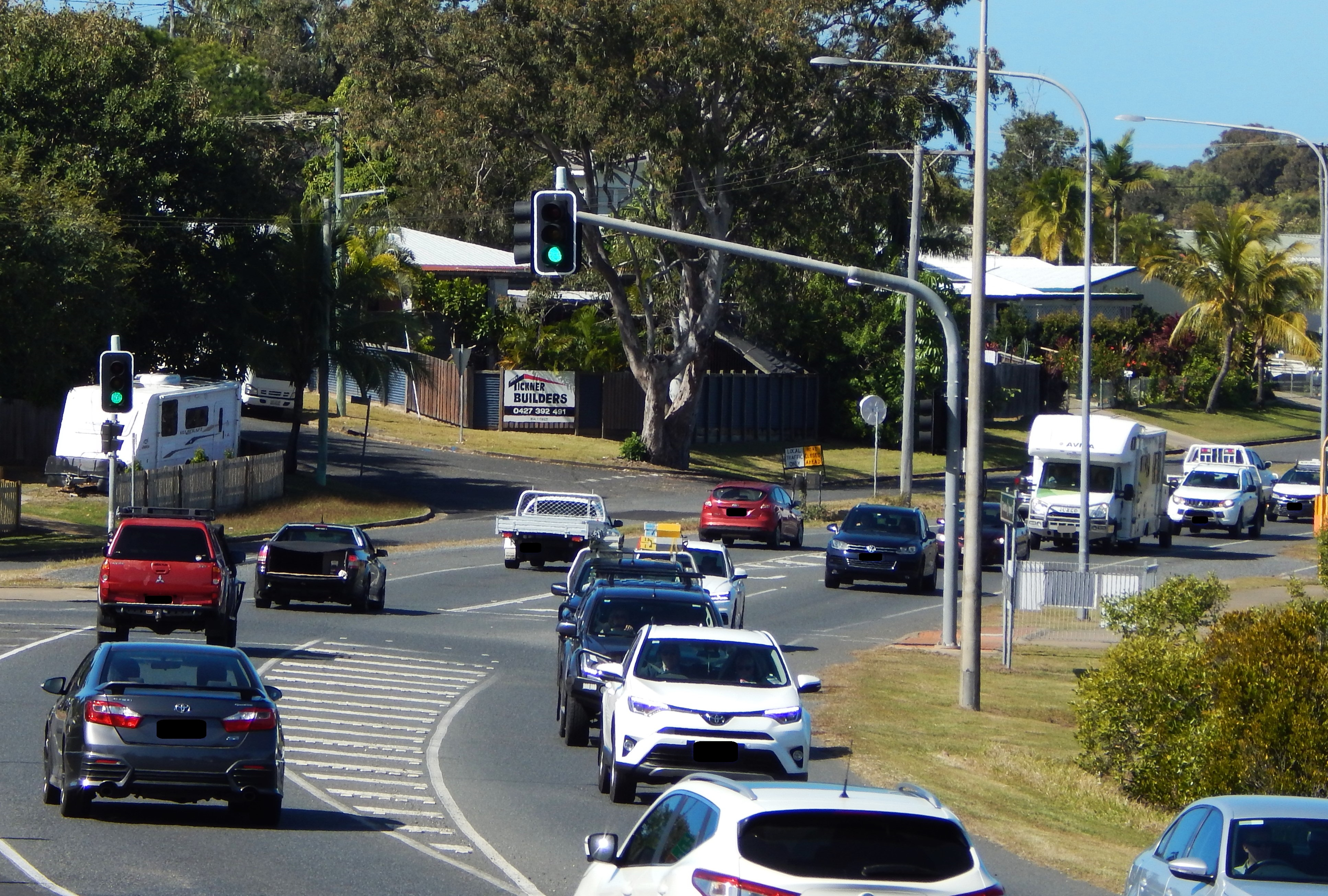
Scenic Highway as it passes through Cooee Bay, 2022

The highway commences at a roundabout near the southern boundary of Yeppoon, which connects to the (northern) main road from Rockhampton (Yeppoon Road) and the coastal road to the northern part of Yeppoon (Appleton Drive) It passes from Yeppoon through Cooee Bay, Lammermoor, Rosslyn, Mulambin, Causeway Lake and Kinka Beach to Emu Park.

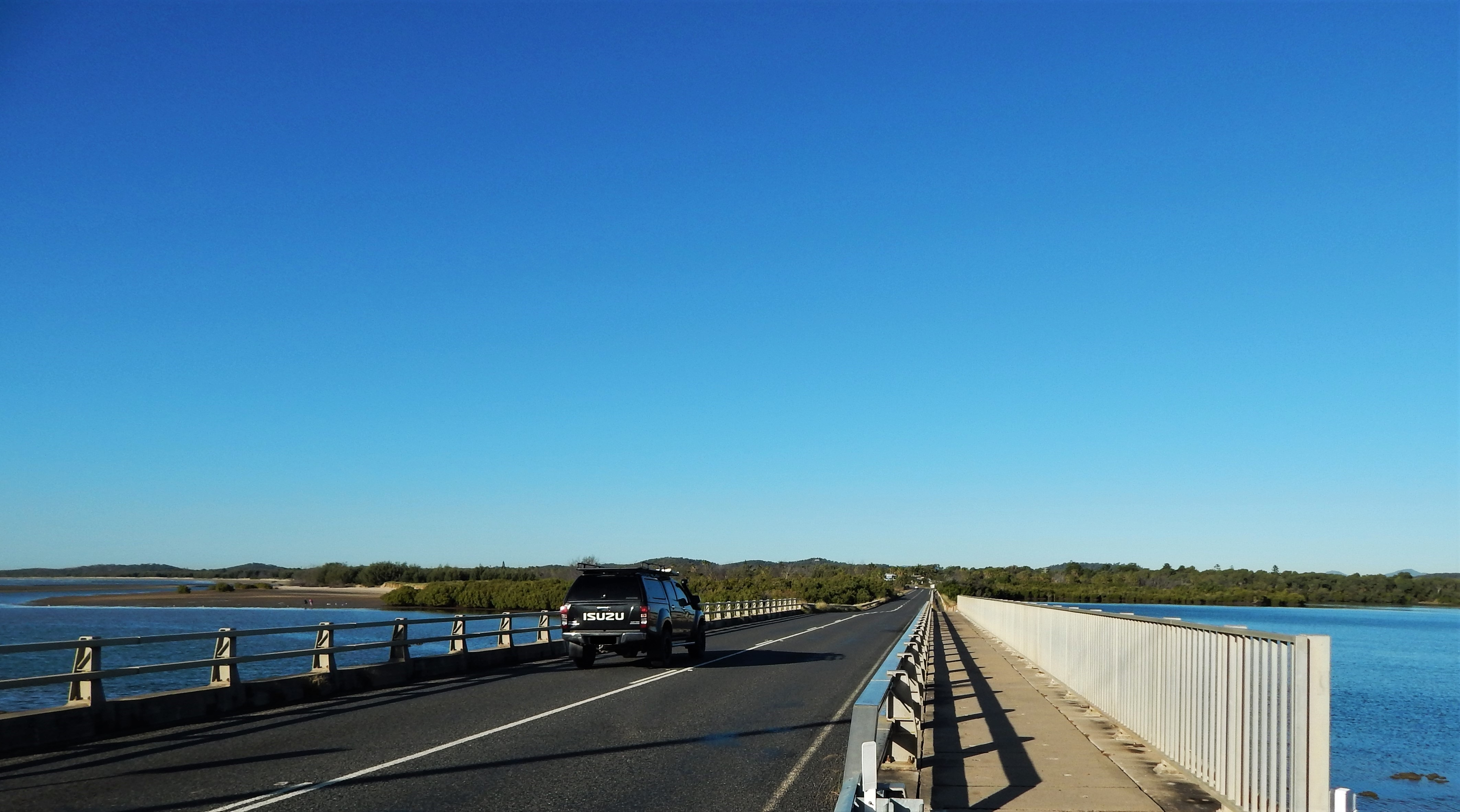
Scenic Highway at Causeway Lake, 2022

After proceeding south-east for about 350 metres it crosses Ross Creek and passes between Cooee Bay (to the east) and Taranganba (to the west) It then proceeds through Lammermoor, running beside the beach for about 1 km before reaching Rosslyn. Where it enters Rosslyn the road is cut into an ocean-front cliff-face near Statue Bay. This section of road was closed from 20 February 2015 until 26 July 2018 due to a landslip caused by Cyclone Marcia. A temporary detour through suburban streets was in use throughout the closure.

The road continues south along the coast, crossing Mulambin Creek at Causeway Lake and running the length of Kinka Beach. It then proceeds slightly inland to cross Shoalwater Creek and enter the locality of Emu Park. In Emu Park it terminates at a roundabout which connects to the (southern) main road to Rockhampton (Hill Street, which becomes Emu Park Road), the Emu Park Jetty (to the north-east) and the southern part of Emu Park.

== Major intersections ==
The entire road is in the Shire of Livingstone local government area.

| Location | km | mi | Destinations | Notes |
|---|---|---|---|---|
| Yeppoon | 0 | 0.0 | Yeppoon Road (State Route 4 / Tourist Drive 10) – south–west – Rockhampton; Appleton Drive – north – Yeppoon | Roundabout. State Route 4 / Tourist Drive 10 continues south-east as Scenic Highway. |
| Ross Creek | 0.35 | 0.22 | Henry Beak Bridge | |
| Cooee Bay / Taranganba midpoint | 0.65 | 0.40 | Matthew Flinders Drive – south–east – Cooee Bay | Access to Wreck Point Lookout |
| Cooee Bay / Taranganba midpoint | 1.8 | 1.1 | Taranganba Road – south–west – Taranganba | |
| Cooee Bay / Taranganba / Lammermoor tripoint | 2.2 | 1.4 | Matthew Flinders Drive – north–east – Cooee Bay / Robinson Street – south–west – Taranganba | |
| Rosslyn | 8.1 | 5.0 | Vin E Jones Memorial Drive – north – Rosslyn | Access to Rosslyn Bay Marina |
| Mulambin Creek | 11.6 | 7.2 | No known name | |
| Kinka Beach | 15.1 | 9.4 | Kinka Beach Road – north–west – Tanby | |
| Emu Park | 20.0 | 12.4 | Hill Street (State Route 4 / Tourist Drive 10) – south–west – Rockhampton / Pattison Street – south–east – Emu Park / Hill Street – north–east – Emu Park | Roundabout. Southern end of Scenic Highway. Hill Street (north–east) provides access to Emu Park Jetty and the Singing Ship Monument. |
1.000 mi = 1.609 km; 1.000 km = 0.621 mi
