= Rosslyn, Queensland =

Rosslyn
- Town
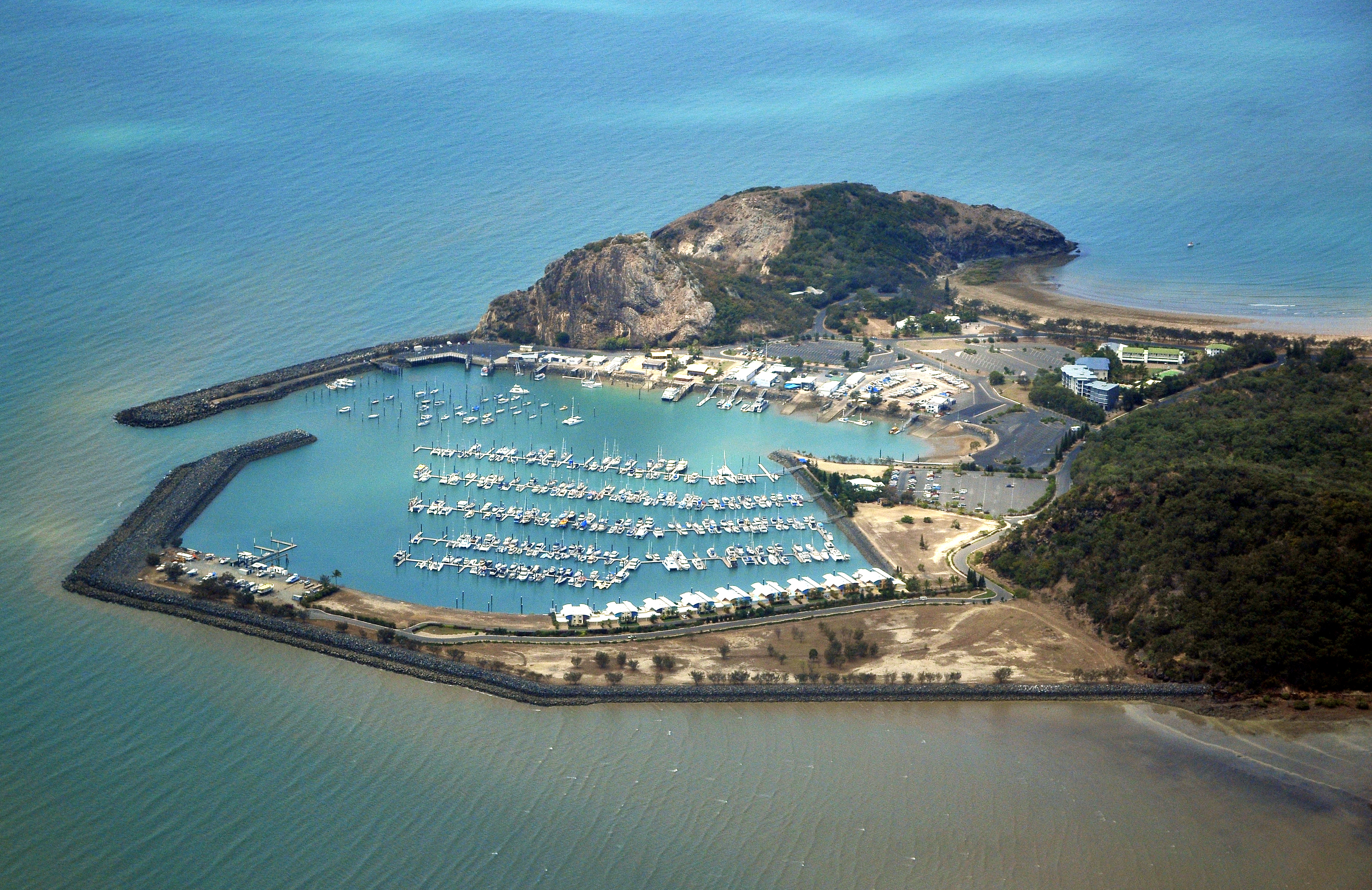
- Rosslyn Bay with marina, 2009

- Interactive map of Rosslyn
- Coordinates: 23.1661°S 150.7763°E
- Country: Australia
- State: Queensland
- LGA: Shire of Livingstone
- Location: 7.1 km (4.4 mi) SE of Yeppoon; 46.3 km (28.8 mi) NE of Rockhampton CBD; 737 km (458 mi) NNW of Brisbane

Government
  - State electorate: Keppel
  - Federal division: Capricornia

Area
  - Total: 18.6 km^{2} (7.2 sq mi)

Population
  - Total: 613 (2021 census)
  - Density: 32.96/km^{2} (85.36/sq mi)
- Time zone: UTC+10:00 (AEST)
- Postcode: 4703
Localities around Rosslyn
Lammermore	Coral Sea	Coral Sea
Lammermore	Rosslyn	Coral Sea
Taroomball	Causeway Lake	Mulambin

Rosslyn is a coastal town and locality in the Livingstone Shire, Queensland, Australia. In the 2021 census, the locality of Rosslyn had a population of 613 people.

== Geography ==
Historically, the town of Rosslyn developed along the beaches on either side of Statue Rock, a headland into the Coral Sea. However, when locality boundaries were formalised, Statue Rock was placed on the boundary of the locality of Lammermoor to the west and the locality of Rosslyn to the east.

The northern boundary of the locality is coastal commencing at Statue Rock along the beach at Statue Bay (where the residential development is located) to Rosslyn Head (where the Rosslyn Bay Boat Harbour has been developed). The eastern boundary of the locality is also coastal, commencing at Rosslyn Head, along Kemp Beach to Bluff Point.

The Scenic Highway runs from south to north-west through the locality.

Most of the land in the locality is undeveloped. The Rosslyn Head area is mostly reserved as the Capricorn Coast National Park (23.1814°S 150.7953°E), apart from the marina and a resort. Bluff Point is also part of the national park. Most of the inland parts of the locality remain Crown land under the control of the Queensland Government.

== Demographics ==
In the 2016 census, the locality of Rosslyn had a population of 574 people.

In the 2021 census, the locality of Rosslyn had a population of 613 people.

== Education ==
There are no schools in Rosslyn. The nearest government primary school is Taranganba State School in Taranganba to the north-west. The nearest government secondary school is Yeppoon State High School in Yeppoon to the north-west.

== Amenities ==
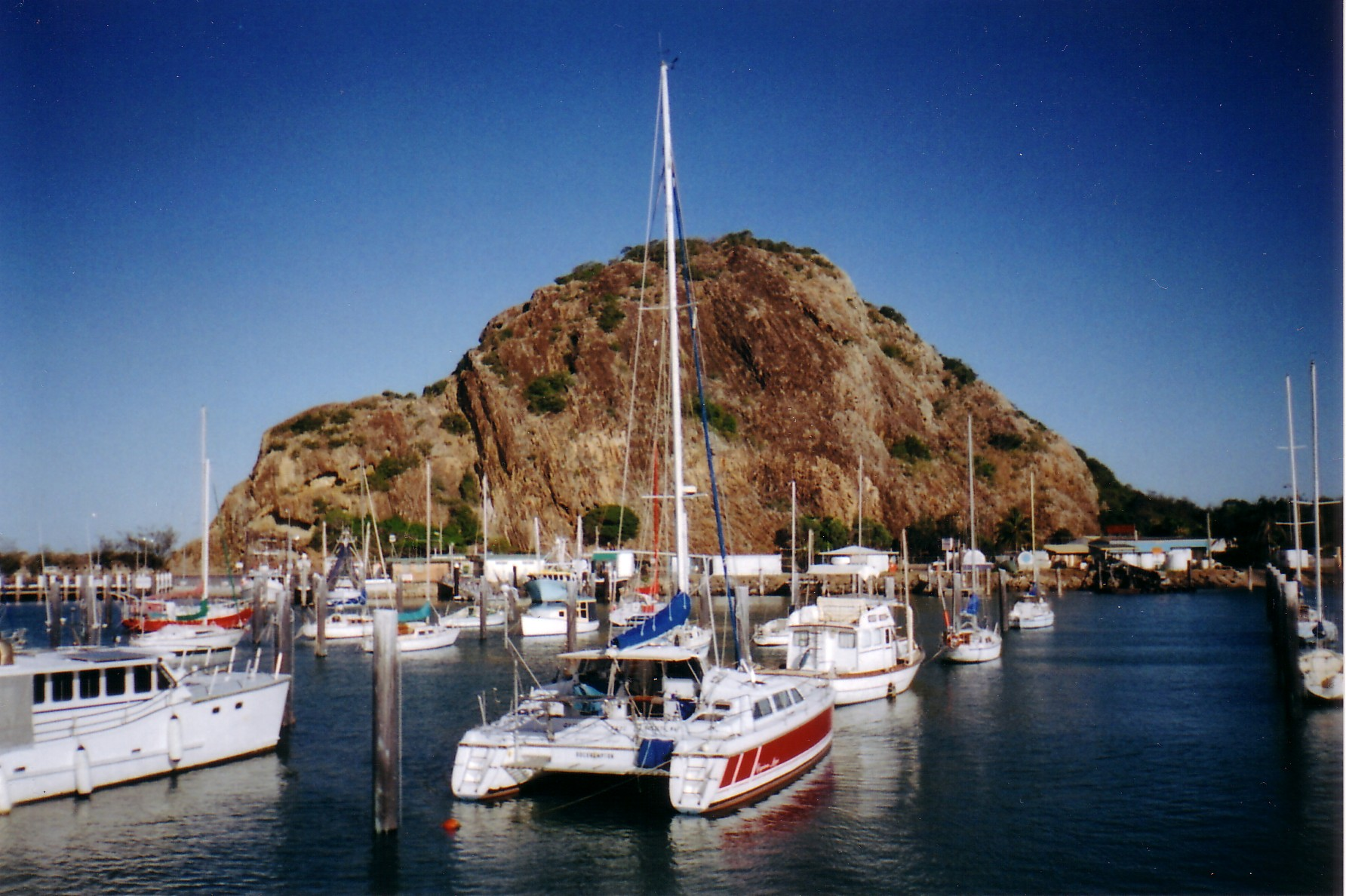
Marina, 2004

There are a number of parks in the area:

- Discovery Crescent Park (23.1664°S 150.7779°E)
- Mulambin Beach Nature Park (23.1857°S 150.7931°E)
- Kemp Beach Park (23.1761°S 150.7922°E)

Keppel Bay Marina is a 13.9-hectare (34-acre) marina (23.1613°S 150.7866°E).

There are a number of boat ramps in the locality, all managed by the Department of Transport and Main Roads:

- Anchor Drive (eastern) into Rosslyn Bay State Boat Harbour (23.1640°S 150.7890°E)
- Breakwater Drive (western) into Rosslyn Bay State Boat Harbour (23.1641°S 150.7879°E)

There are a number of jetties in the locality, all managed by the Department of Transport and Main Roads:

- Vin. E. Jones Drive in the north-east corner of Rosslyn Bay State Boat Harbour (23.1607°S 150.7905°E)
- Rosslyn Bay Commercial Jetty #1 in the north-east corner of the harbour (23.1610°S 150.7904°E)
- Rosslyn Bay Commercial Jetty #2 in the north-east corner of the harbour (23.1609°S 150.7905°E)
- Rosslyn Bay Lay-up Maintenance Jetty in the north-east corner of the harbour, near wall moorings (23.1602°S 150.7902°E)

== Extinction ==
Paspalum batianoffii, an extinct grass species which was only known from one preserved herbarium specimen collected by Australian Botanists (Batianoff, G.N and Mcdonald, T.J) in 1977 and later identified in 1991. It was collected from the fore dunes of Statue Bay beach near the Rosslyn Head Section of the Capricorn Coast National Park which was the only known site where this species lived. Paspalum batianoffii is listed as "extinct in the wild" under the Queensland Nature Conservation Act 1992, and listed as "Extinct" under the Australian Government Environment Protection and Biodiversity Conservation Act 1999. The reason for the species decline and extinction remains unknown.
