= Taroomball, Queensland =

Taroomball
- Suburb
- Interactive map of Taroomball
- Coordinates: 23.1705°S 150.7508°E
- Country: Australia
- State: Queensland
- LGA: Livingstone Shire
- Location: 2.8 km (1.7 mi) S of Yeppoon; 42.0 km (26.1 mi) NE of Rockhampton CBD; 672 km (418 mi) NNW of Brisbane

Government
  - State electorate: Keppel
  - Federal division: Capricornia

Area
  - Total: 13.1 km^{2} (5.1 sq mi)

Population
  - Total: 1,136 (2021 census)
  - Density: 86.7/km^{2} (224.6/sq mi)
- Time zone: UTC+10:00 (AEST)
- Postcode: 4703
Suburbs around Taroomball
Hidden Valley	Yeppoon	Taranganba
Hidden Valley	Taroomball	Lammermoor
Hidden Valley	Tanby	Causeway Lake; Rosslyn

Taroomball is a rural locality in the Livingstone Shire, Queensland, Australia. In the 2021 census, Taroomball had a population of 1,136 people.

== Geography ==
Ross Creek rises in the south of the locality and flows to the north before exiting.

== Demographics ==
In the 2016 census, Taroomball had a population of 845 people.

In the 2021 census, Taroomball had a population of 1,136 people.

== Education ==
There are no schools in Taroomball. The nearest government primary schools are Taranganba State School in neighbouring Taranganba to the north-east and Yeppoon State School in neighbouring Yeppoon to the north. The nearest government secondary school is Yeppoon State High School, also in Yeppoon. There are also non-government schools in Yeppoon and its suburbs.

== Amenities ==
There are a number of parks in the area, including:

- Jorden Ave Park (23.1571°S 150.7560°E)
- Naomi Drive Park (23.1460°S 150.7402°E)
