= Ross Creek (Central Queensland) =

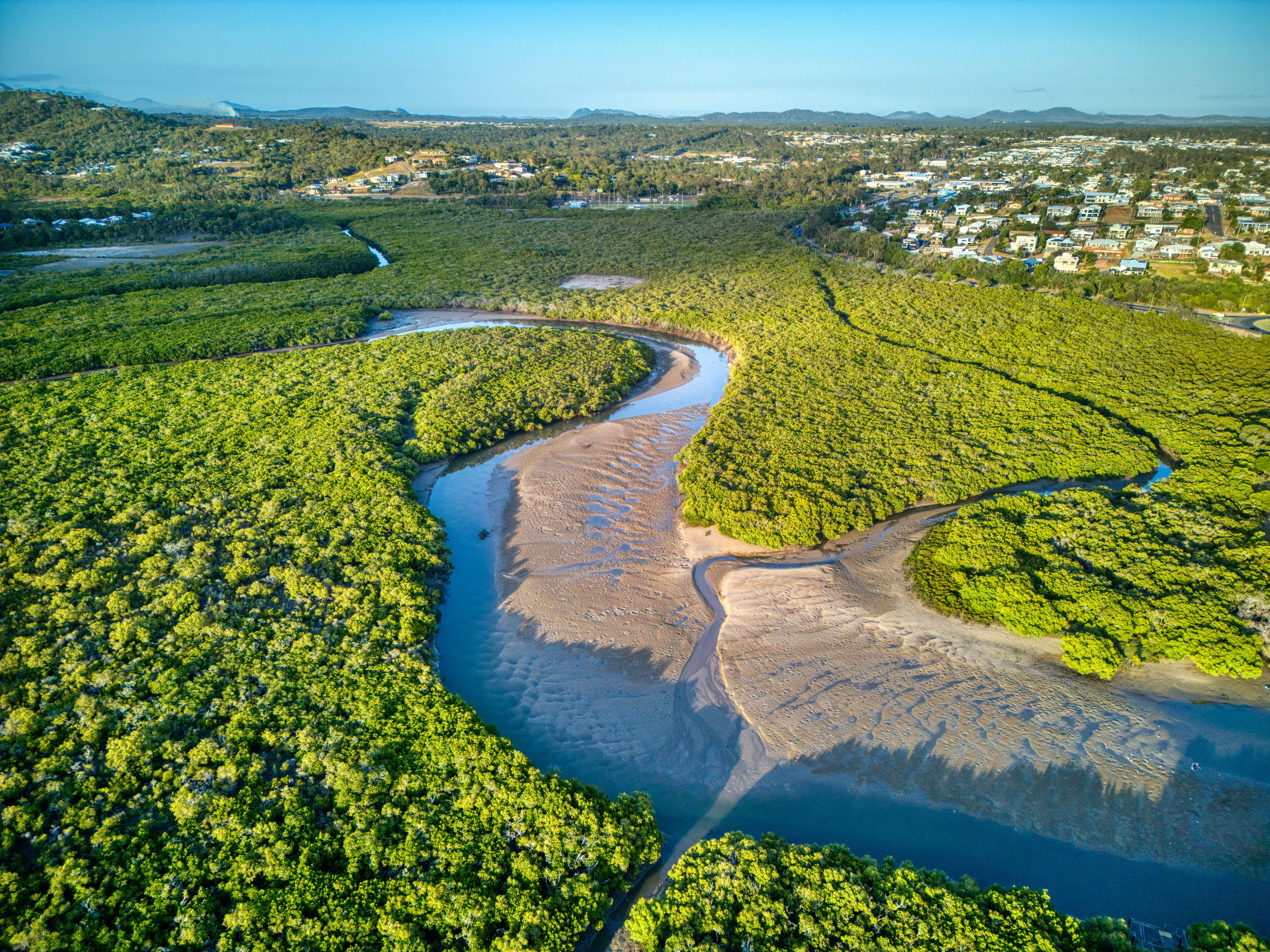

Physical characteristics
- Source
  - location: Taroomball
  - coordinates: 23.17699°S 150.74583°E
  - elevation: 22 metres (72 ft)
- Mouth
  - location: Yeppoon / Cooee Bay
  - coordinates: 23.13673°S 150.75155°E
  - elevation: 0 metres (0 ft)

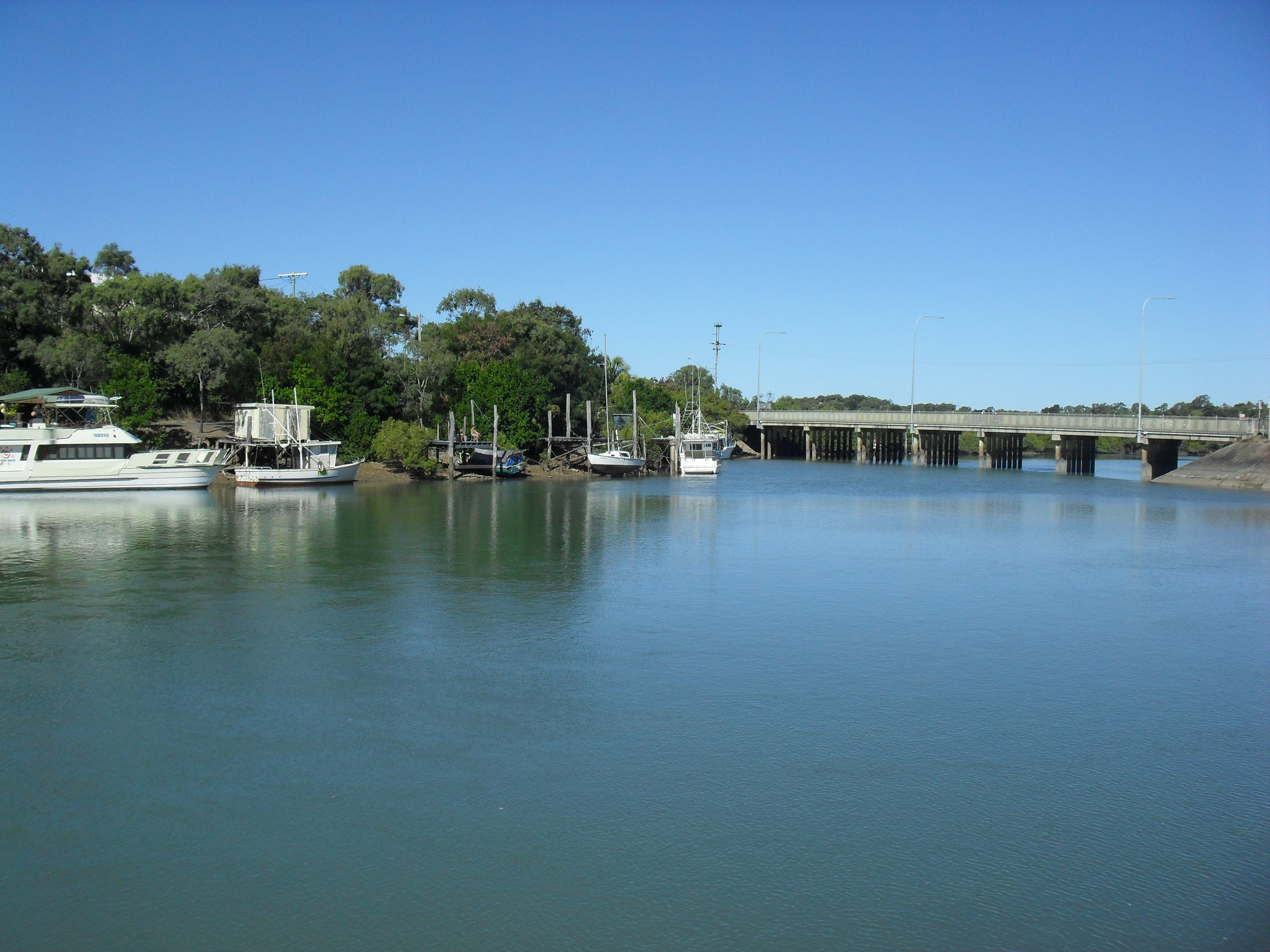
Henry Beak Bridge over Ross Creek

Ross Creek is a creek in the Shire of Livingstone in Central Queensland, Australia. It rises in the locality of Taroomball and flows into the Coral Sea between the localities of Yeppoon to the north and Cooee Bay to the south.

== Geography ==
The Scenic Highway connects Yeppoon with Cooee Bay and other southern towns; it crosses Ross Creek via the Henry Beak Bridge (23.13856°S 150.75194°E).

== Amenities ==
There is a park, boat ramp, and public barbecues at the mouth of the creek. Markets are held every month.

Ross Creek is known for its fishing. On the incoming tide, the creek fills to near capacity. Man-made stone walls on either side of the creek, plus a sandy beach at the mouth provide plentiful fishing spots. Whiting, flathead, and silver bream are common catches.

On the low tide, muddy sandbars on the southern side of the bridge are revealed and are a popular place for pumping for yabbies.

== Flora and fauna ==
Sandy at its mouth, Ross Creek becomes muddier on the other side of the bridge and is popular for mud crabs. Hectares of low-lying land either side of Ross Creek fills at high tide, providing the perfect environment for mangroves to grow. In turn, the mangroves give shelter to crustaceans, prawns, and fish. Queensland Government studies have identified ten different species of mangrove in the Ross Creek-Fig Tree Creek system.

Ross Creek is also famous as a breeding ground for colonies of flying foxes. The mangroves provide a permanent home for approximately 2,000 black flying foxes (Pteropus alecto), as well as a seasonal camp for several hundred thousand little red flying foxes (Pteropus scapulatus).

== History ==
The Livingstone Bridge was built across Ross Creek in 1926 to facilitate land development in Cooee Bay. It was replaced in 1972 by the Henry Beak Bridge, named after former Livingstone Shire Council Chairman Henry Beak.

Several trawlers still berth in Ross Creek, the remnants of an intensive sea scallop fishing industry based at Ross Creek up until Rosslyn Bay took shape in the 1970s.

Also visible on the eastern wall by the creek mouth are the remains of a concrete-and-stone saltwater pool that was built in the 1950s as a safe swimming place for children.

== See also ==
- List of rivers of Australia
