= Taranganba =

- Town
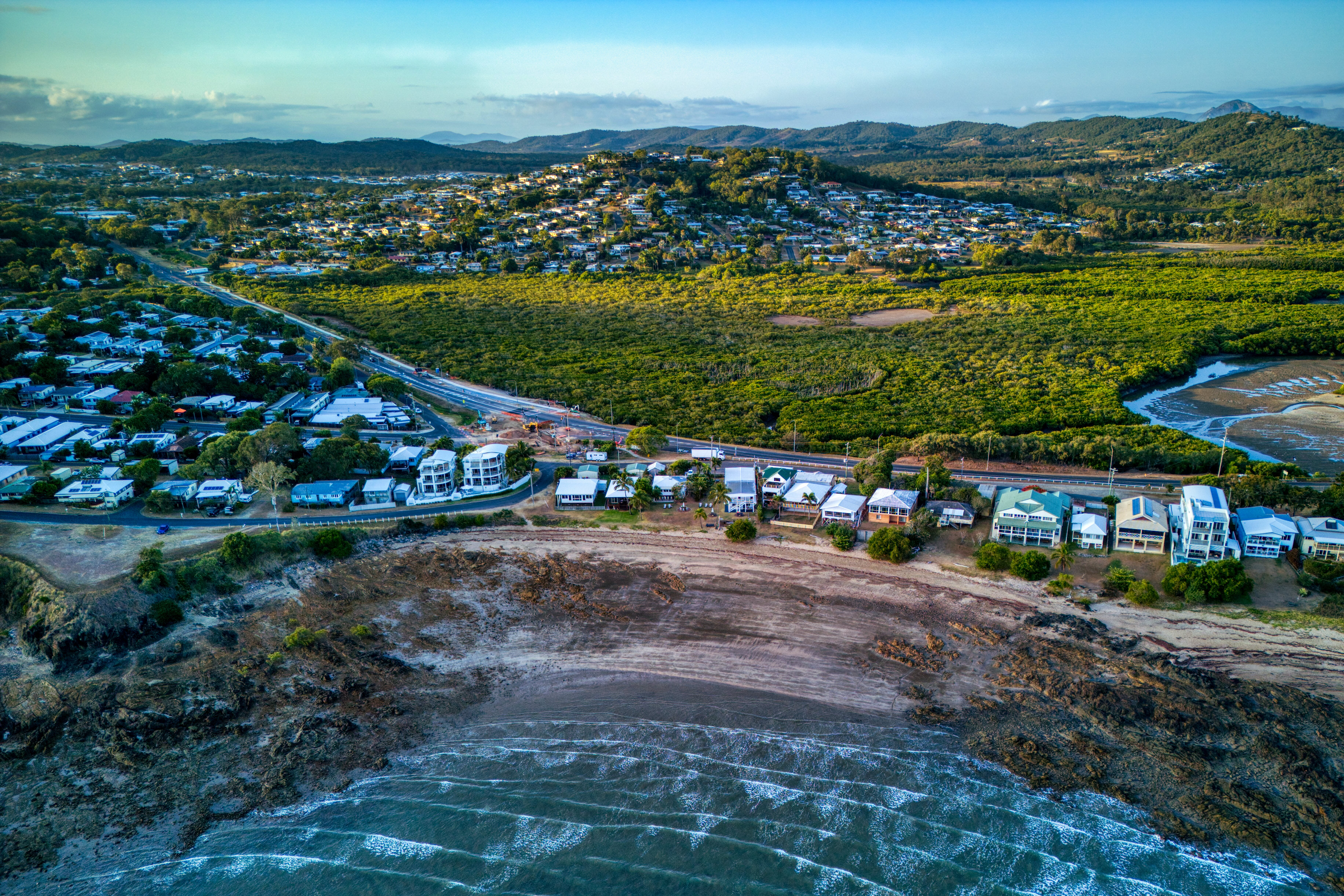
- The hill of Taranganba

- Interactive map of Taranganba
- Coordinates: 23.1497°S 150.7522°E
- Country: Australia
- State: Queensland
- Region: Central Queensland
- LGA: Shire of Livingstone
- Location: 3.5 km (2.2 mi) SE of Yeppoon; 42.9 km (26.7 mi) NE of Rockhampton; 681 km (423 mi) NNW of Brisbane

Government
  - State electorate: Keppel
  - Federal division: Capricornia

Area
  - Total: 2.1 km^{2} (0.81 sq mi)

Population
  - Total: 2,275 (2021 census)
  - Density: 1,083/km^{2} (2,810/sq mi)
- Time zone: UTC+10:00 (AEST)
- Postcode: 4703
Localities around Taranganba
Yeppoon	Yeppoon	Cooee Bay
Taroomball	Taranganba	Cooee Bay
Taroomball	Taroomball	Lammermoor

Taranganba is a town and locality in the Shire of Livingstone, Queensland, Australia. In the 2021 census, the locality of Taranganba had a population of 2,275 people.

== Geography ==
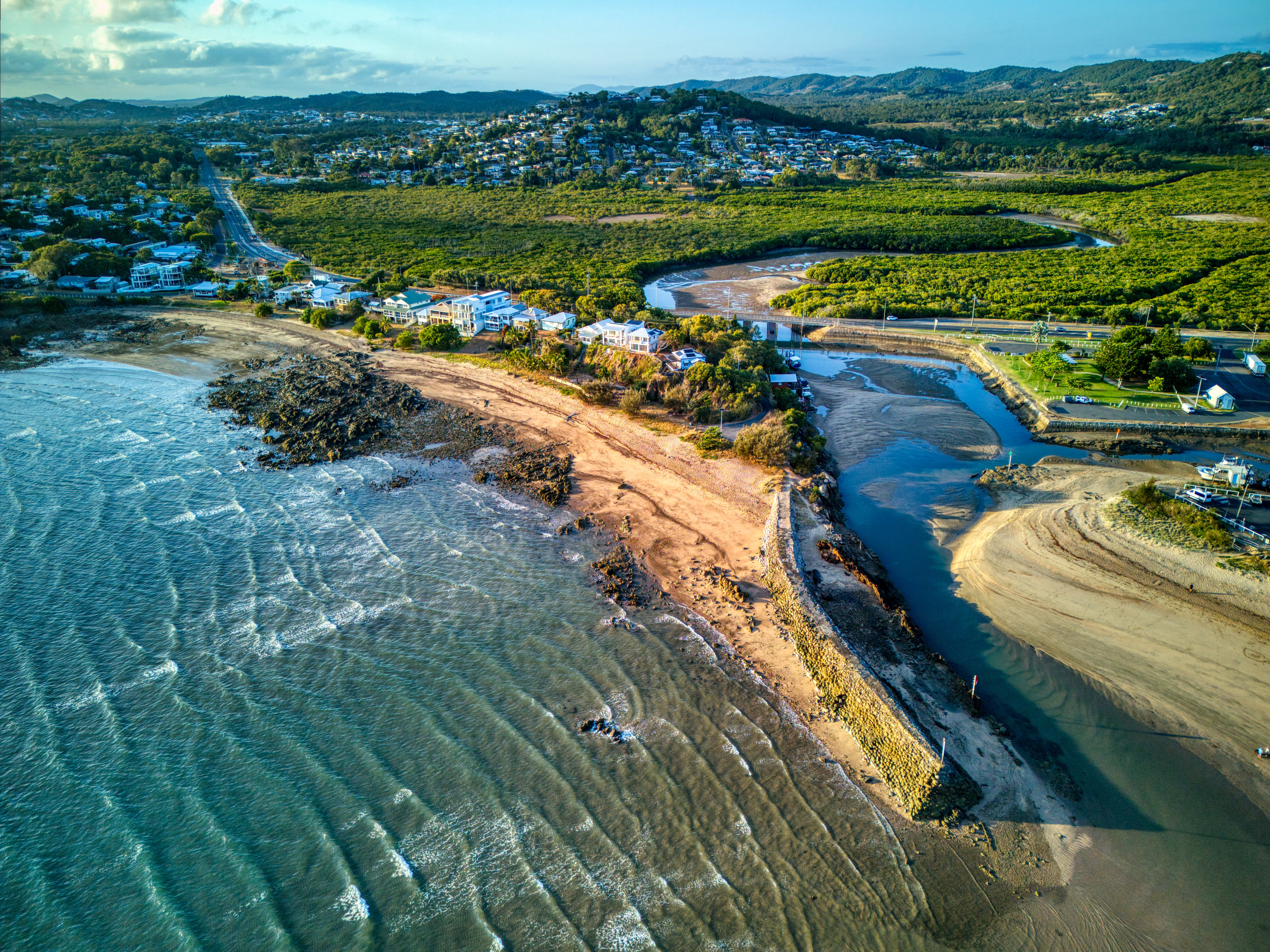
Taranganba and the RossCreek

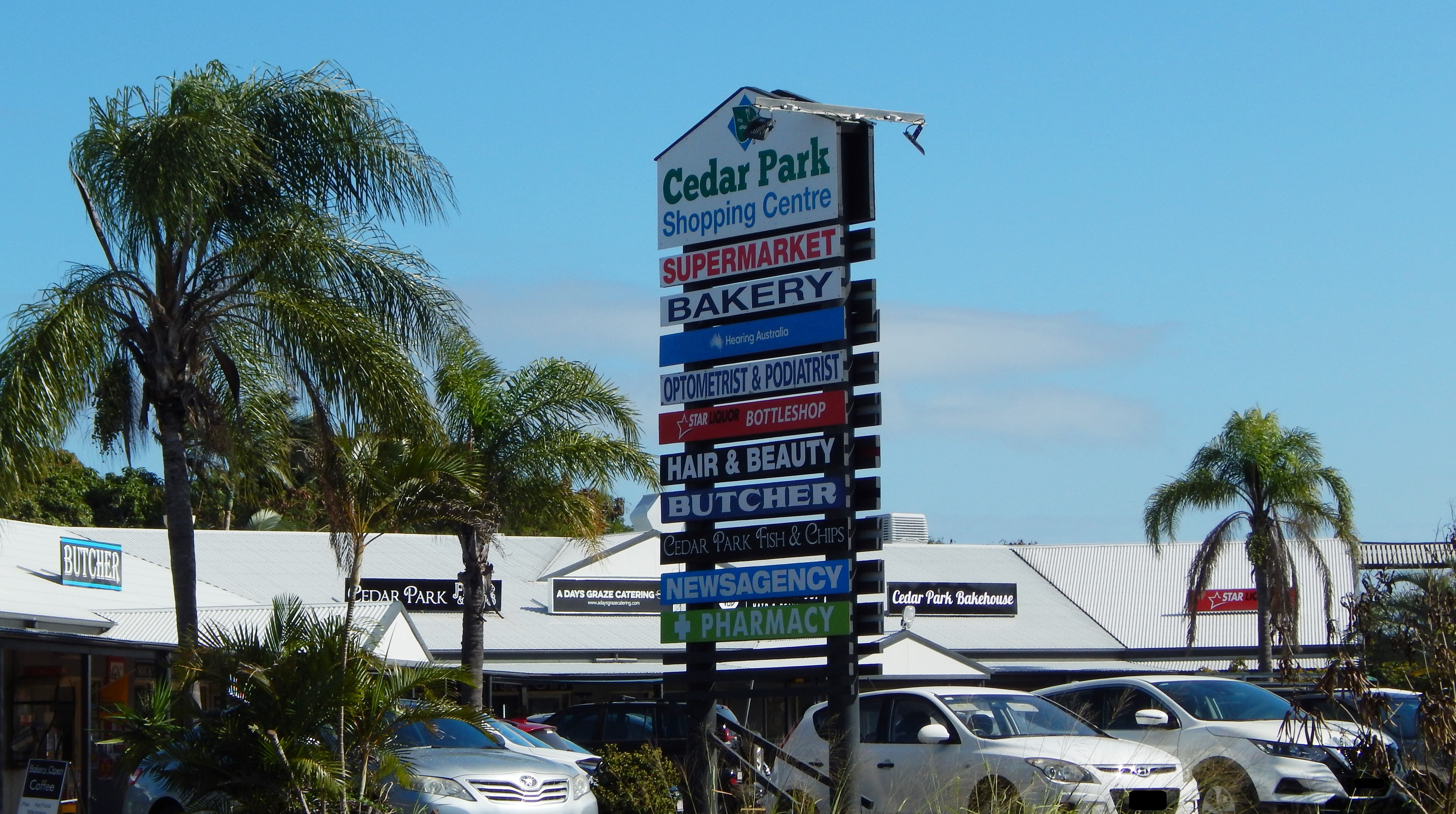
Cedar Park shopping centre at Taranganba, 2022

Taranganba is set back from Keppel Bay on a low broad hill that overlooks Cooee Bay and Yeppoon. It is centrally located on the Capricorn Coast, 3 km (1.9 mi) south of Yeppoon, and 16 km (9.9 mi) north of Emu Park.

Taranganba is often regarded as a suburb of the town of Yeppoon. Like its neighbouring suburb Cooee Bay, Taranganba is separated from Yeppoon by Ross Creek.

The Scenic Highway (State Route 4) runs along the eastern boundary.

Taranganba is largely residential with most homes being built since the 1970s. Cedar Park at Taranganba is the central shopping district for the area, and travelling from Yeppoon, it is the last significant shopping precinct until Emu Park.

== History ==
Taranganba State School opened on 1 February 1993.

Prior to the 2008 local government amalgamations, the Capricorn Coast was within the Shire of Livingstone. From 2008 to 2013, it was part of Rockhampton Region. The Shire of Livingstone was re-established in the 2014 local government de-amalgamations.

== Demographics ==
In the 2006 census, the locality of Taranganba had a population of 1,882 people.

In the 2011 census, the locality of Taranganba had a population of 2,430 people.

In the 2016 census, the locality of Taranganba had a population of 2,276 people.

In the 2021 census, the locality of Taranganba had a population of 2,275 people.

== Education ==
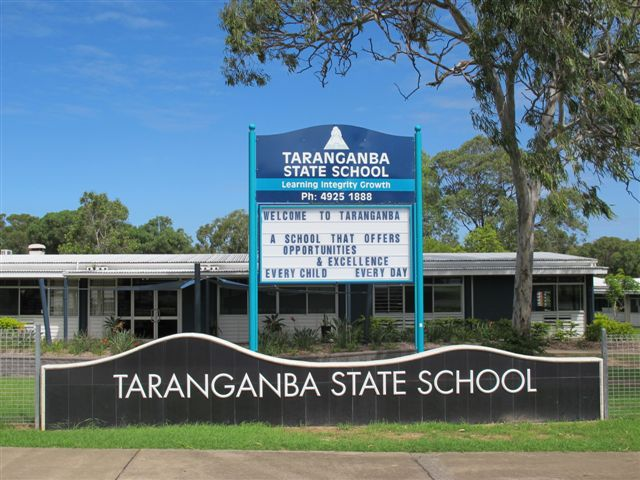
Taranganba State School, 2013

Taranganba State School is a government primary (Prep-6) school for boys and girls at Taranganba Road (23.1546°S 150.7542°E). In 2015, the school had an enrolment of 670 students. In 2018, the school had an enrolment of 694 students with 47 teachers (41 full-time equivalent) and 37 non-teaching staff (22 full-time equivalent). It includes a special education program.

There are no secondary schools in Taranganba. The nearest government secondary school is Yeppoon State High School in neighbouring Yeppoon to the north.

== Community ==
Taranganba is a steadily growing community. Several major land developments in Tarranganba and the neighbouring localities of Lammermoor and Taroomball are filling quickly with demand from the mining boom.

Many residents of Taranganba work in Rockhampton and live on the coast.
