= Capricorn Coast National Park =

National park in Australia

- IUCN category II (national park)
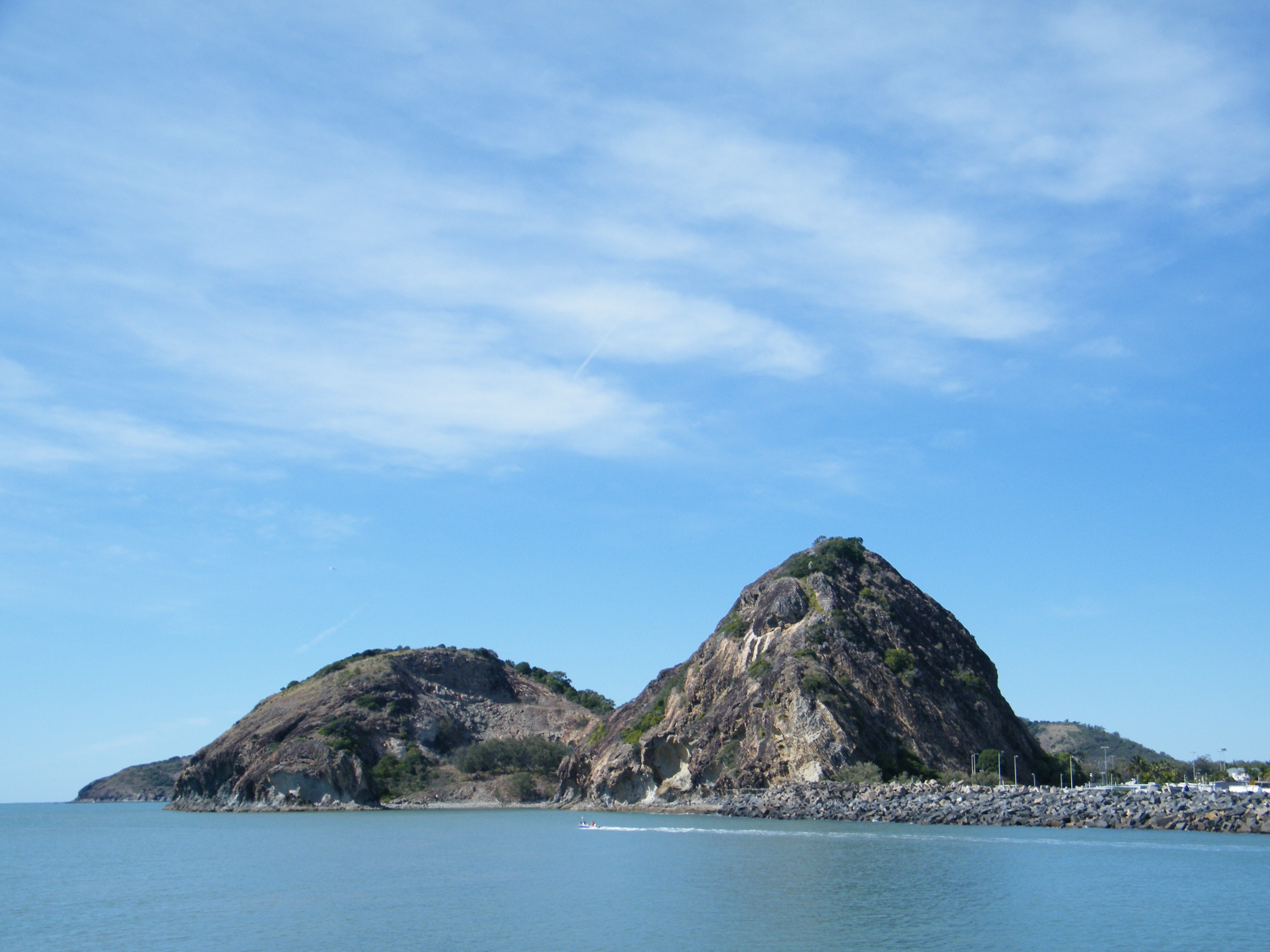
- The Double Head section of Capricorn Coast National Park.

- Location within Queensland
- Location: Queensland
- Coordinates: 23°07′20″S 150°44′38″E
- Area: 1.14 km^{2} (0.44 sq mi)
- Established: 1992
- Governing body: Queensland Parks and Wildlife Service
- Website: https://parks.qld.gov.au/parks/capricorn-coast

Capricorn Coast is a national park in the Shire of Livingstone, Queensland, Australia.

== Geography ==
The park is 535 km northwest of Brisbane.

It covers about 114 hectares, and is divided into five sections: Vallis Park, Rosslyn Head, Double Head, Bluff Point, Cocoanut Point, and Pinnacle Point. The five sections were amalgamated into a single national park in 1994. The average elevation of the terrain is 34 metres.

== Wildlife ==
The park is home to 402 different species of animals, of which 24 species are rare or endangered.

== Location ==
Sections	Longitude (DMS)	Latitude (DMS)	Latitude (Decimal)	Longitude (Decimal)	Coordinates
Double Head	-23°9'49.5" E	150°47'32.6" S	-23.163764°	150.792378°	23.163764°S 150.792378°E
Rosslyn Head	-23°10'1.2" E	150°47'13.7" S	-23.167014°	150.787131°	23.167014°S 150.787131°E
Bluff Point	-23°10'44.3" E	150°47'36.9" S	-23.178978°	150.793596°	23.178978°S 150.793596°E
Pinnacle Point	-23°11'53.7" E	150°47'29.4" S	-23.198259°	150.791496°	23.198259°S 150.791496°E
Cocoanut Point	-23°17'14.6" E	150°48'44.7" S	-23.287388°	150.812426°	23.287388°S 150.812426°E
Vallus Park	-23°7'14.4" E	150°44'42.6" S	-23.120679°	150.745167°	23.120679°S 150.745167°E

== See also ==
- Protected areas of Queensland
