= Maryvale, Queensland (Livingstone) =

Maryvale
- Suburb
- Interactive map of Maryvale
- Coordinates: 22.9852°S 150.6233°E
- Country: Australia
- State: Queensland
- LGA: Livingstone Shire
- Location: 38.7 km (24.0 mi) NNW of Yeppoon; 69.6 km (43.2 mi) NNE of Rockhampton; 693 km (431 mi) NNW of Brisbane

Government
  - State electorate: Keppel
  - Federal division: Capricornia

Area
  - Total: 84.7 km^{2} (32.7 sq mi)

Population
  - Total: 48 (2021 census)
  - Density: 0.567/km^{2} (1.468/sq mi)
- Time zone: UTC+10:00 (AEST)
- Postcode: 4703
Suburbs around Maryvale
Canal Creek	Byfield	Byfield
Greenlake	Maryvale	Woodbury
Greenlake	Bungundarra	Bungundarra

Maryvale is a rural locality in the Livingstone Shire, Queensland, Australia. In the 2021 census, Maryvale had a population of 48 people.

== Demographics ==
In the 2016 census, Maryvale had a population of 29 people.

In the 2021 census, Maryvale had a population of 48 people.

== Education ==
There are no schools in Maryvale. The nearest government primary schools are Byfield State School in neighbouring Byfield to the north, Farnborough State School in Farnborough to the south-east, and Milman State School in Milman to the south-west. The nearest government secondary school is Yeppoon State High School in Yeppoon to the south-west.
