= Barlows Hill, Queensland =

Barlows Hill
- Suburb
- Interactive map of Barlows Hill
- Coordinates: 23.1094°S 150.7405°E
- Country: Australia
- State: Queensland
- City: Yeppoon
- LGA: Livingstone Shire
- Location: 4.5 km (2.8 mi) N of Yeppoon; 45 km (28 mi) NE of Rockhampton; 686 km (426 mi) NNW of Brisbane

Government
  - State electorate: Keppel
  - Federal division: Capricornia

Area
  - Total: 0.9 km^{2} (0.35 sq mi)
- Elevation: 7–147 m (23–482 ft)

Population
  - Total: 834 (2021 census)
  - Density: 930/km^{2} (2,400/sq mi)
- Time zone: UTC+10:00 (AEST)
- Postcode: 4703
Suburbs around Barlows Hill
Pacific Heights	Pacific Heights	Yeppoon
Inverness	Barlows Hill	Yeppoon
Inverness	Yeppoon	Meikleville Hill

Barlows Hill is a residential locality in the Livingstone Shire, Queensland, Australia. In the 2021 census, Barlows Hill had a population of 834 people.

== Geography ==
The locality is north of the town of Yeppoon. Although very close to the Coral Sea, a narrow strip of beachside housing which is part of the locality of Yeppoon separates the Barlows Hill locality from the ocean with Farnborough Road forming the eastern boundary of the locality. Jarman Street which runs west from Farnborough Road is the main road through the locality with most other streets radiating from Jarman Street. From east to west, Jarman Street rises from 7 to 47 metres (23 to 154 ft) above sea level with the highest parts of the locality further west rising to 144 metres (472 ft) above sea level.

The land use is suburban housing with some undeveloped land in the west and south-west of the locality.

== History ==
The locality was officially named and bounded on 18 February 2000.

== Demographics ==
In the 2016 census Barlows Hill had a population of 777 people.

In the 2021 census, Barlows Hill had a population of 834 people.

== Education ==
There are no schools in Barlows Hill. The nearest government primary schools are Yeppoon State School in neighbouring Yeppoon to the south and Farnborough State School in Farnborough to the north. The nearest government secondary school is Yeppoon State High School, also in Yeppoon to the south.

== Amenities ==
There are a number of parks in the area:

- Barnes Street Park (23.1048°S 150.7452°E)
- Bradford Park (23.1054°S 150.7416°E)
