= Bondoola, Queensland =

Bondoola
- Suburb
- Interactive map of Bondoola
- Coordinates: 23.1861°S 150.6855°E
- Country: Australia
- State: Queensland
- LGA: Livingstone Shire
- Location: 8.0 km (5.0 mi) SW of Yeppoon; 34.2 km (21.3 mi) NE of Rockhampton; 675 km (419 mi) NNW of Brisbane

Government
  - State electorate: Keppel
  - Federal division: Capricornia

Area
  - Total: 38.9 km^{2} (15.0 sq mi)

Population
  - Total: 551 (2021 census)
  - Density: 14.165/km^{2} (36.69/sq mi)
- Time zone: UTC+10:00 (AEST)
- Postcode: 4703
Suburbs around Bondoola
Lake Mary	Barmaryee	Barmaryee
Cobraball	Bondoola	Hidden Valley
Mulara	Cawarral	Tanby

Bondoola is a rural locality in the Livingstone Shire, Queensland, Australia. In the 2021 census, Bondoola had a population of 551 people.

== Geography ==
The Rockhampton-Yeppoon Road (as Yeppoon Road) runs through from south-west to north-east.

Bondoola railway station is an abandoned railway station on the now-dismantled North Rockhampton to Emu Park railway line (23.1741°S 150.6890°E).

== History ==
Kington Provisional School opened on 21 February 1887 under teacher Mr Redstone with nine students. It closed on 31 March 1893. It reopened on 6 July 1896 and renamed Bondoola Provisional School in 1897. In 1910, it became Bondoola State School. As at 1921, it was north of Cobraball Road (approx 23.1746°S 150.6880°E). It relocated to a new site in 1933. The school celebrated its golden jubilee (50th anniversary) in November 1937. As at 1942, it was located immediately south of the railway station at 54 Bondoola Road (23.17460°S 150.68795°E). It closed in 1945.

== Demographics ==
In the 2016 census, Bondoola had a population of 530 people.

In the 2021 census, Bondoola had a population of 551 people.

== Education ==
There are no schools in Bondoola. The nearest government primary schools are Yeppoon State School in Yeppoon to the north-east and Cawarral State School in neighbouring Cawarral to the south. The nearest government secondary school is Yeppoon State High School in Yeppoon.
