= Greenlake, Queensland =

Greenlake
- Suburb
- Interactive map of Greenlake
- Coordinates: 23.0355°S 150.555°E
- Country: Australia
- State: Queensland
- LGA: Livingstone Shire
- Location: 21.4 km (13.3 mi) NE of Milman; 27.7 km (17.2 mi) WNW of Farnborough; 28.8 km (17.9 mi) NW of Yeppoon; 47.2 km (29.3 mi) N of Rockhampton; 691 km (429 mi) NNW of Brisbane

Government
  - State electorate: Keppel
  - Federal division: Capricornia

Area
  - Total: 68.1 km^{2} (26.3 sq mi)
- Elevation: 20–159 m (66–522 ft)

Population
  - Total: 0 (2021 census)
  - Density: 0.000/km^{2} (0.000/sq mi)
- Time zone: UTC+10:00 (AEST)
- Postcode: 4701
Suburbs around Greenlake
Canal Creek	Canal Creek	Maryvale
Rossmoya	Greenlake	Bungundarra
Rossmoya	Barmoya	Lake Mary

Greenlake is a rural locality in the Livingstone Shire, Queensland, Australia. In the 2021 census, Greenlake had "no people or a very low population".

== Geography ==
Greenlake is north-west of Yeppoon and north of Rockhampton.

The northern part of the locality is relatively flat at 20 metres (66 ft) above sea level. It is used for plantation forestry.

The rest of the locality varies in elevation from 20 to 159 metres (66 to 522 ft) and is predominantly used for grazing on native vegetation.

Mount Atherton is in the south-west of the locality (23.0484°S 150.5456°E) and at 159 metres (522 ft) above sea level is the highest point in the locality.

== History ==
The locality presumably takes its name from Green Lake, a lake in the west of the locality (23.0167°S 150.5333°E).

== Demographics ==
In the 2016 census, Greenlake had "no people or a very low population".

In the 2021 census, Greenlake had "no people or a very low population".

== Education ==
There are no schools in Greenlake. The nearest government primary schools are Milman State School in Milman to the south-west, Yeppoon State School in Yeppoon to the south-east, and Farnborough State School in Farnborough to the east. The nearest government secondary school is Yeppoon State High School in Yeppoon.
