= Bungundarra =

- Suburb
- Interactive map of Bungundarra
- Coordinates: 23.0458°S 150.6402°E
- Country: Australia
- State: Queensland
- LGA: Livingstone Shire
- Location: 18 km (11 mi) NW of Yeppoon; 54.4 km (33.8 mi) NNE of Rockhampton; 672 km (418 mi) NNW of Brisbane

Government
  - State electorate: Keppel
  - Federal division: Capricornia

Area
  - Total: 69.1 km^{2} (26.7 sq mi)

Population
  - Total: 667 (2021 census)
  - Density: 9.653/km^{2} (25.00/sq mi)
- Time zone: UTC+10:00 (AEST)
- Postcode: 4703
Suburbs around Bungundarra
Maryvale	Maryvale	Woodbury
Greenlake	Bungundarra	Farnborough
Lake Mary	Lake Mary	Adelaide Park

Bungundarra is a rural locality in the Livingstone Shire, Queensland, Australia. In the 2021 census, Bungundarra had a population of 667 people.

== Geography ==
Mount Lizard is in the north of the locality (23.0147°S 150.6411°E) at a height of 230 metres (750 ft) above sea level.

== History ==
Bungundarra Provisional School opened in July 1912 as a half-time provisional school in conjunction with Barmoya Provisional School (meaning they shared a single teacher). From the start of 1913, it became a full-time provisional school and became Bungundarra State School on 1 June 1913. It closed on 10 July 1950. It was on the western side of Bungundarra Road (approx 23.06011°S 150.65378°E).

== Demographics ==
In the 2016 census, Bungundarra had a population of 536 people.

In the 2021 census, Bungundarra had a population of 667 people.

== Education ==
There are no schools in the locality. The nearest government primary schools are Farnborough State School in neighbouring Farnborough to the east and Yeppoon State School in Yeppoon to the south-east. The nearest government secondary school is Yeppoon State High School in Yeppoon.
