= Adelaide Park, Queensland =

Adelaide Park
- Suburb
- Interactive map of Adelaide Park
- Coordinates: 23.0980°S 150.695°E
- Country: Australia
- State: Queensland
- LGA: Shire of Livingstone
- Location: 8.4 km (5.2 mi) NW of Yeppoon; 45.2 km (28.1 mi) NE of Rockhampton; 686 km (426 mi) NNW of Brisbane

Government
  - State electorate: Keppel
  - Federal division: Capricornia

Area
  - Total: 24.1 km^{2} (9.3 sq mi)

Population
  - Total: 449 (2021 census)
  - Density: 18.63/km^{2} (48.25/sq mi)
- Time zone: UTC+10:00 (AEST)
- Postcode: 4703
Suburbs around Adelaide Park
Bungundarra	Bungundarra	Farnborough
Lake Mary	Adelaide Park	Pacific Heights
Lake Mary	Barmaryee	Inverness

Adelaide Park is a rural locality in the Livingstone Shire, Queensland, Australia. In the 2021 census, Adelaide Park had a population of 449 people.

== Geography ==
Adelaide Park is in the hinterland of the Capricorn Coast. It is bounded to the west by Limestone Creek and to the north by a line of hills approx 200 metres above sea level. Another line of hills runs from the north-west to the south-east of the locality from about 130 metres to 340 metres at Mount Barmoya (23.1055°S 150.71°E).

== History ==
The locality takes its name from the Adelaide Park pastoral station that roughly occupied the land of the present day Adelaide Park locality. The land was purchased in 1868 by James and Mary Atherton who moved there in 1870. The Atherton family established the first road to Rockhampton and then extended it to Yeppoon.

== Demographics ==
In the 2016 census, Adelaide Park had a population of 424 people.

In the 2021 census, Adelaide Park had a population of 449 people.

== Education ==
There are no schools in Adelaide Park. The nearest government primary school is Yeppoon State School in Yeppoon to the south-east and Farnborough State School in neighbouring Farnborough to the north-east. The nearest government secondary school is Yeppoon State High School in Yeppoon.
