= Cobraball, Queensland =

Cobraball
- Suburb
- Interactive map of Cobraball
- Coordinates: 23.1502°S 150.6127°E
- Country: Australia
- State: Queensland
- LGA: Livingstone Shire
- Location: 12.1 km (7.5 mi) WSW of Yeppoon; 35.9 km (22.3 mi) NE of Rockhampton; 674 km (419 mi) NNW of Brisbane

Government
  - State electorate: Keppel
  - Federal division: Capricornia

Area
  - Total: 43.6 km^{2} (16.8 sq mi)

Population
  - Total: 81 (2021 census)
  - Density: 1.858/km^{2} (4.81/sq mi)
- Time zone: UTC+10:00 (AEST)
- Postcode: 4703
Suburbs around Cobraball
Lake Mary	Lake Mary	Lake Mary
Barmoya	Cobraball	Bondoola
Sandringham	Mulara	Bondoola

Cobraball is a rural locality in the Livingstone Shire, Queensland, Australia. In the 2021 census, Cobraball had a population of 81 people.

== Geography ==
Cobraball has the following mountains (from north to south):

- Mount Cobberra (23.1485°S 150.6152°E), 211 metres (692 ft)
- Black Mountain (23.1713°S 150.5750°E), rising to 212 metres (696 ft) above sea level
- Camp Hill Rock (23.1741°S 150.5899°E), 212 metres (696 ft)

The predominant land use is grazing on native vegetation.

== History ==
On 9 November 2019, a bushfire broke out on Old Byfield Road. It spread quickly and unpredictably, putting lives and property at risk with many people being evacuated over the following days. Up to 11,500 hectares (28,000 acres) were burned with homes and other structures destroyed, as the fire spread to other localities. Livestock and native animals were also killed.

== Demographics ==
In the 2016 census, Cobraball had a population of 70 people.

In the 2021 census, Cobraball had a population of 81 people.

== Education ==
There are no schools in Cobraball. The nearest government primary schools are Yeppoon State School in Yeppoon to the east and Parkhurst State School in Parkhurst, Rockhampton, to the south-west. The nearest government secondary schools are Yeppoon State High School, also in Yeppoon, and Glenmore State High School in Kawana, Rockhampton.
