= Acacia capillosa =

Scientific classification
- Kingdom: Plantae
- Clade: Tracheophytes
- Clade: Angiosperms
- Clade: Eudicots
- Clade: Rosids
- Order: Fabales
- Family: Fabaceae
- Subfamily: Caesalpinioideae
- Clade: Mimosoid clade
- Genus: Acacia
- Species: A. capillosa

Binomial name
- Acacia capillosa Pedley

Species of legume

Acacia capillosa is a species of flowering plant in the family Fabaceae and is endemic to Queensland, Australia. It is a spreading shrub or tree with many stems, very narrowly elliptic to narrowly egg-shaped phyllodes, spikes of bright yellow flowers, and linear, papery to thinly leathery pods up to 70 mm (2.8 in) long.

== Description ==
Acacia capillosa is a spreading shrub 1–4 m (3 ft 3 in – 13 ft 1 in) high that matures to a tree 5 m (16 ft) high, and has many stems. Its mature branchlets are usually covered with soft, dense, spreading hairs. The phyllodes are very narrowly elliptic to narrowly egg-shaped, 25–55 mm (0.98–2.17 in) long and 8–14 mm (0.31–0.55 in) wide with many longitudinal veins, usually two somewhat more obvious than the rest. The flowers are bright yellow and borne in one or two spikes 25–50 mm (0.98–1.97 in) long on a peduncle 2–6 mm (0.079–0.236 in) long, in racemes 1–3 mm (0.039–0.118 in) long. Flowering has been observed between April and November and the pods are linear, papery to thinly leathery, 3.5–4.5 mm (0.14–0.18 in) wide.

== Taxonomy ==
Acacia capillosa was first formally described in 1964 by Leslie Pedley in Proceedings of the Royal Society of Queensland from specimens collected near Irvinebank in 1962. The specific epithet (capillosa) means 'abounding in head hairs'.

== Distribution and habitat ==
This species of wattle is found in north-east Queensland between Hidden Valley, Mount Carbine and Ravenshoe where it grows in soils derived from granite and rhyolite in woodlands and thickets.

== See also ==
- List of Acacia species
