= Bangalee, Queensland (Livingstone Shire) =

Bangalee
- Suburb
- Interactive map of Bangalee
- Coordinates: 23.0783°S 150.7836°E
- Country: Australia
- State: Queensland
- LGA: Livingstone Shire
- Location: 10.4 km (6.5 mi) NNE of Yeppoon; 50.6 km (31.4 mi) NW of Rockhampton; 695 km (432 mi) NNW of Brisbane

Government
  - State electorate: Keppel
  - Federal division: Capricornia

Area
  - Total: 2.7 km^{2} (1.0 sq mi)

Population
  - Total: 225 (2021 census)
  - Density: 83.3/km^{2} (216/sq mi)
- Time zone: UTC+10:00 (AEST)
- Postcode: 4702
Suburbs around Bangalee
Farnborough	Farnborough	Coral Sea
Farnborough	Bangalee	The Keppels
Farnborough	Farnborough	Coral Sea

Bangalee is a rural locality in the Livingstone Shire, Queensland, Australia. In the 2021 census, Bangalee had a population of 225 people.

== Geography ==
Bangalee is a tiny strip of coastline on the Capricorn Coast comprising two streets of residential housing beside the beach. It is surrounded by the locality of Farnborough.

== History ==
Between 2008 and 2013 Bangalee (and all of Shire of Livingstone) was within Rockhampton Region. In 2014, Shire of Livingstone was re-established.

== Demographics ==
In the 2016 census, Bangalee had a population of 186 people.

In the 2021 census, Bangalee had a population of 225 people.

== Education ==
There are no schools in Bangalee. The nearest government primary school is Farnborough State School in neighbouring Farnborough to the south-west. The nearest government secondary school is Yeppoon State High School in Yeppoon to the south.
