= William Beak =

Australian cattle breeder and politician (1878–1966)

William Beak MBE
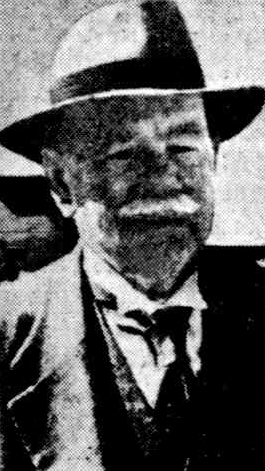

Chairman of Livingstone Shire Council
- In office 1921–1927
- Preceded by: Samuel Thomasson
- Succeeded by: Thomas Smith

Councillor at Broadsound Shire Council
- In office 1911–1919

Councillor at Livingstone Shire Council
- In office 1919–1921

Councillor at Livingstone Shire Council
- In office 1933–1936

Personal details
- Born: 15 January 1878; Mount Hedlow, Queensland, Australia
- Died: 5 June 1966 (aged 88); Rockhampton, Queensland, Australia
- Occupation: grazier; local government politician
- Known for: Helping establish the Poll Hereford breed of cattle in Australia

William Beak MBE (15 January 1878 – 5 June 1966) was an Australian cattle breeder and local government politician.

He is best known for introducing the Poll Hereford breed of cattle into Australia.

== Early life ==
Beak was born on the family property "Pennard" at Mount Hedlow in 1878, and was the sixth child to his parents, Henry Beak and Essie Beak (née Matchett).

He attended Mount Hedlow State School, a local primary school which opened in 1880 and closed in 1920.

After finishing primary school, Beak learnt cattle husbandry from his father, who founded the Henry Beak & Sons pastoral company in 1905 after acquiring a number of Central Queensland cattle stations following a severe drought. This included May Downs Station near Clermont which Beak managed in 1904.

In July 1908, Beak's father and mother both succumbed to influenza within a week of each other.

Beak settled on a property called "The Meadows" between Nerimbera and Nankin.

== Career ==
=== Cattle breeding ===
In 1913, Beak purchased two "freak" hornless Herford bulls in an attempt to produce polled progeny.

In 1919, Henry Beak & Sons became the first Australian company to import Hereford cattle from the United States of America. One of the imported Herfords, Polled Gemnation, was mated with progeny from the "freak" hornless bulls which established the Polled Hereford breed.

Beak is credited with helping establish the Australian Poll Hereford Breeders' Association in 1922 which later became the Australian Poll Hereford Society, becoming its patron in 1932.

In recognition of his work establishing the breed in Australia, Beak was elected as a life member of the American Polled Hereford Association.

In 1930, Beak's shipment of Poll Hereford beef to the Smithfield Markets in London received high praise, and was described as a "serious competitor to Argentine chilled meat" by the Corporation of London's chief meat inspector.

In 1936, Beak sold his property "The Meadows" situated between Nerimbera and Nankin to the Central Queensland Meat Export Company. Beak and his wife then relocated into Rockhampton where they moved to a house on the corner of Denham Street and Agnes Street in the suburb of The Range.

With an interest in stud cattle breeding and carcass judging, Beak published The Key to Divine Designs and their Guidance for the Improvement of Beef Quality in 1956, in which he endorsed the controversial theory of telegony. This was followed by 1957's Passing on more discoveries by a layman in which Beak claimed a person could judge the internal features of fat steers by tapping them with their fingers and listening for sounds.

=== Local government and public office ===
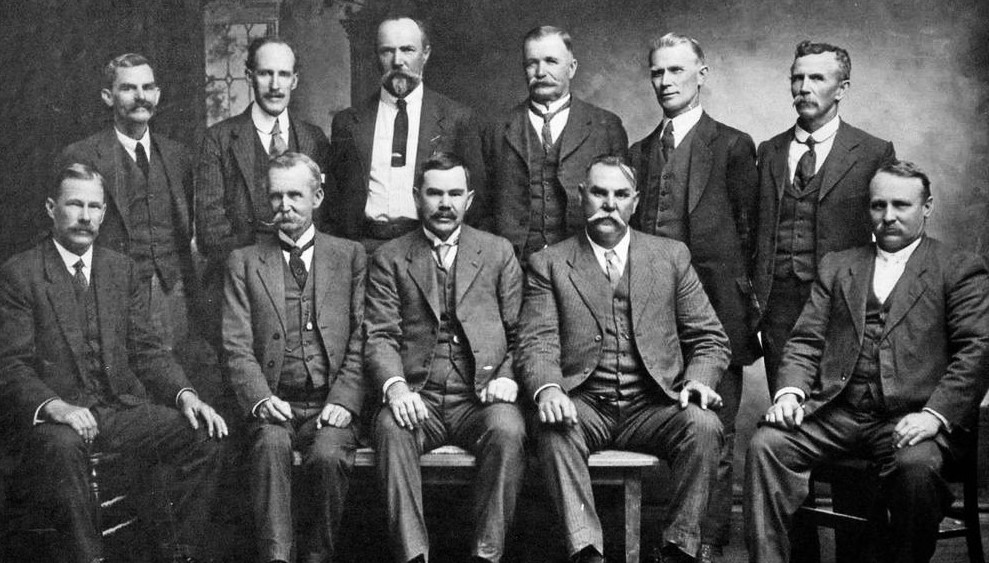
William Beak (front row, centre) after his election as Livingstone Shire Council chairman, 1921

Beak served as a councillor on Livingstone Shire Council from 1904 to 1905, before serving on the Broadsound Shire Council from 1911 to 1919.

He returned to Livingstone Shire in 1919 where he again served as a councillor until 1927, six of those as the shire chairman after he was elected unopposed in 1921. He served as chairman until his defeat in 1927.

He again returned to Livingstone Shire Council in 1933, seeing out his last three years as a councillor, finishing up upon his defeat at the 1936 local elections.

In addition to his local government duties, Beak was also a chairman of the Rockhampton Harbour Board from 1924 to 1926. He also served as chairman of the Central Queensland Racing Association and as a member of the local hospital board.

== Personal life and death ==
Beak married Flora McKenzie on 6 March 1913 at the homestead on Calioran Station at South Yaamba.

Beak's wife Flora died on 26 September 1941, and was buried in the North Rockhampton Cemetery on 27 September 1941.

Beak died in Rockhampton on 5 June 1966 and was buried in the North Rockhampton Cemetery on 7 June 1966.

Just five days after his death, Beak was honoured in the 1966 Birthday Honours with an MBE in recognition to his service to the beef industry.
