= Barmaryee, Queensland =

Barmaryee
- Suburb
- Interactive map of Barmaryee
- Coordinates: 23.145°S 150.7080°E
- Country: Australia
- State: Queensland
- LGA: Shire of Livingstone
- Location: 2.5 km (1.6 mi) W of Yeppoon; 40.7 km (25.3 mi) NE of Rockhampton CBD; 655 km (407 mi) NNW of Brisbane

Government
  - State electorate: Keppel
  - Federal division: Capricornia

Area
  - Total: 12.7 km^{2} (4.9 sq mi)

Population
  - Total: 925 (2021 census)
  - Density: 72.8/km^{2} (188.6/sq mi)
- Time zone: UTC+10:00 (AEST)
- Postcode: 4703
Suburbs around Barmaryee
Lake Mary	Adelaide Park	Inverness
Lake Mary	Barmaryee	Yeppoon
Lake Mary	Bondoola	Hidden Valley

Barmaryee is a rural locality in the Livingstone Shire, Queensland, Australia. In the 2021 census, Barmaryee had a population of 925 people.

== Geography ==
The land use is a mix of rural residential and grazing land in the west of the locality, suburban residential development in the east of the locality, with the south of the locality containing the racecourse and the landfill.

The Rockhampton-Yeppoon Road (as Yeppoon Road) runs along part of the southern boundary.

== Demographics ==
In the 2016 census, Barmaryee had a population of 878 people. 86.9% of people were born in Australia and 93.7% of people only spoke English at home. The most common responses for religion were Catholic 32.9%, Anglican 20.2% and No Religion 18.6%.

In the 2021 census, Barmaryee had a population of 925 people.

== Education ==
There are no schools in Barmaryee. The nearest government primary school is Yeppoon State School in neighbouring Yeppoon to the east. The nearest government secondary school is Yeppoon State High School, also in Yeppoon.

== Facilities ==
Yeppoon Landfill is at 2745 Yeppoon Road (23.1564°S 150.7067°E). It is operated by Livingstone Shire Council.

== Amenities ==
There are a number of parks in the locality, including:

- Kingston Park (23.1438°S 150.7131°E)
- Racecourse Road Park (23.1382°S 150.7068°E)
- Stanley Ave Park (23.1413°S 150.7122°E)

== Attractions ==
Yeppoon Turf Club operates Keppel Park Racecourse is at 65 Racecourse Road (23.1449°S 150.7051°E).
