= Lake Mary, Queensland =

Lake Mary
- Suburb
- Interactive map of Lake Mary
- Coordinates: 23.1163°S 150.6225°E
- Country: Australia
- State: Queensland
- LGA: Livingstone Shire
- Location: 18.7 km (11.6 mi) W of Yeppoon; 41.0 km (25.5 mi) NNE of Rockhampton CBD; 681 km (423 mi) NNW of Brisbane

Government
  - State electorate: Keppel
  - Federal division: Capricornia

Area
  - Total: 47.1 km^{2} (18.2 sq mi)

Population
  - Total: 96 (2021 census)
  - Density: 2.038/km^{2} (5.28/sq mi)
- Time zone: UTC+10:00 (AEST)
- Postcode: 4703
Suburbs around Lake Mary
Greenlake	Bungundarra	Adelaide Park
Barmoya	Lake Mary	Barmaryee
Cobraball	Cobraball	Bondoola

Lake Mary is a rural locality in the Livingstone Shire, Queensland, Australia. In the 2021 census, Lake Mary had a population of 96 people.

== Geography ==
The locality is bounded to the south-west by Hedlow Creek and to the north and east by Limestone Creek.

The locality is presumably named after the lake which is in the western part of the locality (23.1167°S 150.5833°E).

Lake Mary has the following mountains:

- Mount Hedlow (23.1238°S 150.5811°E) 217 metres (712 ft)
- Rocky Cone Mountain (23.1494°S 150.5919°E) 172 metres (564 ft)

The land use is predominantly grazing on native vegetation with some crop growing.

== Demographics ==
In the 2016 census, Lake Mary had a population of 96 people.

In the 2021 census, Lake Mary had a population of 96 people.

== Education ==
There are no schools in Lake Mary. The nearest government primary and secondary schools are Yeppoon State School and Yeppoon State High School in Yeppoon to the east.
