= Inverness, Queensland =

Inverness
- Suburb
- Interactive map of Inverness
- Coordinates: 23.1175°S 150.7244°E
- Country: Australia
- State: Queensland
- LGA: Livingstone Shire
- Location: 3.3 km (2.1 mi) NNW of Yeppoon; 43.2 km (26.8 mi) NE of Rockhampton; 675 km (419 mi) N of Brisbane

Government
  - State electorate: Keppel
  - Federal division: Capricornia

Area
  - Total: 5.7 km^{2} (2.2 sq mi)

Population
  - Total: 460 (2021 census)
  - Density: 80.7/km^{2} (209/sq mi)
- Time zone: UTC+10:00 (AEST)
- Postcode: 4703
Suburbs around Inverness
Adelaide Park	Adelaide Park	Pacific Heights; Barlows Hill
Adelaide Park	Inverness	Yeppoon
Barmaryee	Barmaryee	Yeppoon

Inverness is a rural locality in the Livingstone Shire, Queensland, Australia. In the 2021 census, Inverness had a population of 460 people.

== Geography ==
The locality is loosely bounded to the north and north-east by the Coast Range rising to elevations of 165 metres (541 ft) above sea level. The north-west of the locality is on the slopes of Mount Barmoya (in the neighbouring locality of Adelaide Park) rising to elevations of 247 metres (810 ft). The land use in the locality is predominantly rural residential housing with some grazing on native vegetation.

== Demographics ==
In the 2016 census, Inverness had a population of 496 people.

In the 2021 census, Inverness had a population of 460 people.

== Education ==
There are no schools in Inverness. The nearest government primary and secondary schools are Yeppoon State School and Yeppoon State High School, both in neighbouring Yeppoon to the south-east. There are also non-government schools in Yeppoon and nearby localities.

== Amenities ==
Springdale Park is at 43 Springdale Avenue (23.1181°S 150.7216°E).
