= Rockhampton–Yeppoon Road =

Road in Queensland, Australia

Rockhampton–Yeppoon Road Queensland

General information
- Type: Road
- Length: 39.8 km (25 mi)
- Route number(s): no shield (Rockhampton – Berserker) (Berserker – Yeppoon)

Major junctions
- South-west end: Bruce Highway Rockhampton
- Rockhampton–Emu Park Road; Bruce Highway
- North-east end: Yeppoon Road, Western Yeppoon–Emu Park Road Yeppoon

Location(s)
- Major suburbs: Berserker, Parkhurst, Hidden Valley

Rockhampton–Yeppoon Road is a non-continuous 39.8 kilometres (24.7 mi) road route in the Rockhampton and Livingstone local government areas of Queensland, Australia. Most of the route is designated as State Route 4 (Regional) and Tourist Drive 10. It is a state-controlled regional road (number 196).

== Route description ==
Rockhampton–Yeppoon Road commences at an intersection with the Bruce Highway in Rockhampton. Starting as Fitzroy Street it runs north-east through the CBD and crosses the Fitzroy Bridge over the Fitzroy River. It enters Berserker as Toft Street and reaches an intersection with Bridge Street (part of Rockhampton–Emu Park Road) where it joins State Route 4 and Tourist Drive 10. From there it continues north-east as Queen Elizabeth Drive and Musgrave Street before entering Park Avenue as Yaamba Road.

The road reaches an intersection with the Bruce Highway at the mid-point of Park Avenue (locality) and Norman Gardens, where it turns north-west concurrent with the highway. It runs between Park Avenue and Norman Gardens, then between Norman Gardens and Kawana, then between Norman Gardens and Parkhurst. At an intersection it leaves the highway, turning north-east as Yeppoon Road and running between the same two localities.

It passes through the localities of Limestone Creek, Ironpot, Mulara and Bondoola before running between Hidden Valley and Barmaryee. It then runs between Hidden Valley and Yeppoon until it reaches a roundabout intersection with Western Yeppoon–Emu Park Road (see below) where it ends. Yeppoon Road continues east as State Route 4 and Tourist Drive 10.

Land use along the road is mainly rural, but with business and residential developments at each end.

== Road condition ==
The road is fully sealed, with a small section of dual carriageway. The following projects aim to improve the condition of sections of this road.

=== Road train access to Rockhampton ===
The project for upgrading between Gracemere saleyards and the Rockhampton abattoirs to provide access for Type 1 Road Trains, funded by the Northern Australia Beef Roads Program, was completed by early 2021 at a total cost of $30 million. It involved about 29 kilometres (18 mi) of road improvements on four roads:

- Capricorn Highway – from Saleyards Road at Gracemere to the Bruce Highway roundabout at Rochhampton (7.7 kilometres (4.8 mi)).
- Bruce Highway – from the Capricorn Highway roundabout to the Yaamba Road intersection (8.3 kilometres (5.2 mi)).
- Rockhampton–Yeppoon Road – from the Bruce Highway intersection south-west to the Emu Park Road intersection (2.4 kilometres (1.5 mi).
- Rockhampton–Emu Park Road – from the Rockhampton–Yeppoon Road intersection to St Christophers Chapel Road at Nerimbera (10.2 kilometres (6.3 mi)).

=== Road duplication ===
In 2019 an $80 million program funded by the Roads of Strategic Importance (ROSI) program was announced as in the planning stage. The proposed work was duplication of a section of the road in Ironpot and Mulara.

=== Pavement strengthening ===
In 2021 a $5 million project funded from various sources was announced. The proposed work was pavement strengthening and resilience upgrades to a 3.7 kilometres (2.3 mi) section of road.

== History ==
The Archer brothers established the Gracemere pastoral run in 1855, on land that included the present site of Rockhampton. They made use of the Fitzroy River for shipping supplies and produce, and built a woolshed on the river bank. They also played a role in coining the name "Rockhampton" for their riverside worksite. Permanent settlement at the town site began in 1856, and the town was proclaimed and surveyed in 1858. The region expanded quickly due to good available land and water. Land to the north of the river was opened for settlement in the late 1850s, and became the location of both large holdings and small farms. The locality of Parkhurst was the site of a large holding named Glenmore.

The first bridge across the Fitzroy River was opened in 1881, replacing a steam ferry.

A large pastoral run was established along the length of the Capricorn Coast in 1865. The town that is now Yeppoon was surveyed in 1872. It grew to support smaller farms that were set up in the district, producing fruit, cattle and wool. Sugar cane was also grown from 1893 to 1903. The road from Rockhampton was completed in the 1870s.

== Western Yeppoon–Emu Park Road ==
Western Yeppoon–Emu Park Road (Tanby Road)
- Location: Rockhampton–Yeppoon Road, Yeppoon to Rockhampton–Emu Park Road, Emu Park
- Length: 18.8 km (11.7 mi)

Western Yeppoon–Emu Park Road, known locally as Tanby Road, is a state-controlled district road (number 197) rated as a local road of regional significance (LRRS). It runs from an intersection with Rockhampton–Yeppoon Road and Yeppoon Road on the Hidden Valley / Yeppoon midpoint, to Rockhampton–Emu Park Road in Emu Park, a distance of 18.8 kilometres (11.7 mi). This road intersects with Taranganba Street in Taroomball. At its southern end it leaves Tanby Road, becomes Kinka Beach Road and then part of the Scenic Highway.

== Major intersections ==
All distances are from Google Maps.

| LGA | Location | km | mi | Destinations | Notes |
|---|---|---|---|---|---|
| Rockhampton | Rockhampton | 0 | 0.0 | Bruce Highway – northwest, then northeast – Park Avenue – southeast, then south – Allenstown; Fitzroy Street – southwest – Allenstown | South western end of Rockhampton–Yeppoon Road. Road runs northeast as Fitzroy Street. |
| Rockhampton | Berserker | 1.6 | 0.99 | Rockhampton–Emu Park Road (Bridge Street) – southeast – Lakes Creek, Emu Park; Bridge Street – northwest – Park Avenue | Road continues north-east as Queen Elizabeth Drive. |
| Rockhampton | Park Avenue / Norman Gardens midpoint | 4.0 | 2.5 | Bruce Highway – southwest – Rockhampton – north – Parkhurst; Moores Creek Road – northeast – Norman Gardens | Southern concurrency terminus with Bruce Highway. Road continues north. |
| Rockhampton | Norman Gardens / Parkhurst midpoint | 8.3 | 5.2 | Bruce Highway – north – Etna Creek | Northern concurrency terminus with Bruce Highway. Road turns northeast as Yeppoon Road. |
| Livingstone | Hidden Valley / Yeppoon midpoint | 39.8 | 24.7 | Western Yeppoon–Emu Park Road (Tanby Road) – southeast – Emu Park – north – Yeppoon; Yeppoon Road – east – Cooee Bay | North eastern end of Rockhampton–Yeppoon Road. Yeppoon Road continues east. |
1.000 mi = 1.609 km; 1.000 km = 0.621 mi: Route transition

== See also ==
- List of road routes in Queensland
- List of numbered roads in Queensland
- List of tourist drives in Queensland
