= Pacific Heights (disambiguation) =

Pacific Heights is a neighborhood of San Francisco.

Pacific Heights may also refer to:

- Pacific Heights, Queensland, a locality in the Shire of Livingstone, Australia
- Pacific Heights, Saskatoon, Saskatchewan
- Pacific Heights (film), a 1990 American psychological thriller directed by John Schlesinger
