= Meikleville Hill, Queensland =

Meikleville Hill
- Suburb
- Interactive map of Meikleville Hill
- Coordinates: 23.1163°S 150.7444°E
- Country: Australia
- State: Queensland
- LGA: Livingstone Shire
- Location: 4.0 km (2.5 mi) NNE of Yeppoon; 45 km (28 mi) NE of Rockhampton; 685 km (426 mi) NNW of Brisbane

Government
  - State electorate: Keppel
  - Federal division: Capricornia

Area
  - Total: 0.5 km^{2} (0.19 sq mi)

Population
  - Total: 450 (2021 census)
  - Density: 900/km^{2} (2,330/sq mi)
- Time zone: UTC+10:00 (AEST)
- Postcode: 4703
Suburbs around Meikleville Hill
Barlows Hill	Barlows Hill	Yeppoon
Yeppoon	Meikleville Hill	Yeppoon
Yeppoon	Yeppoon	Yeppoon

Meikleville Hill is a rural locality in the Livingstone Shire, Queensland, Australia. In the 2021 census, Meikleville Hill had a population of 450 people.

== History ==
The locality takes its name from a land parcel held by leaseholder Alexander Meikle in the 1880s and 1890s under the name Meikleville.

== Demographics ==
In the 2016 census, Meikleville Hill had a population of 464 people.

In the 2021 census, Meikleville Hill had a population of 450 people.

== Education ==
There are no schools in Meikleville Hill. The nearest government primary and secondary schools are Yeppoon State School and Yeppoon State High School, both in neighbouring Yeppoon to the south.

== Amenities ==
Meikleville Park (also known as Meikleville Bushland Corridor) is at 37-41 Meikleville Street (23.1132°S 150.7447°E). It has a children's playground.
