= Hidden Valley, Queensland =

Hidden Valley
- Suburb
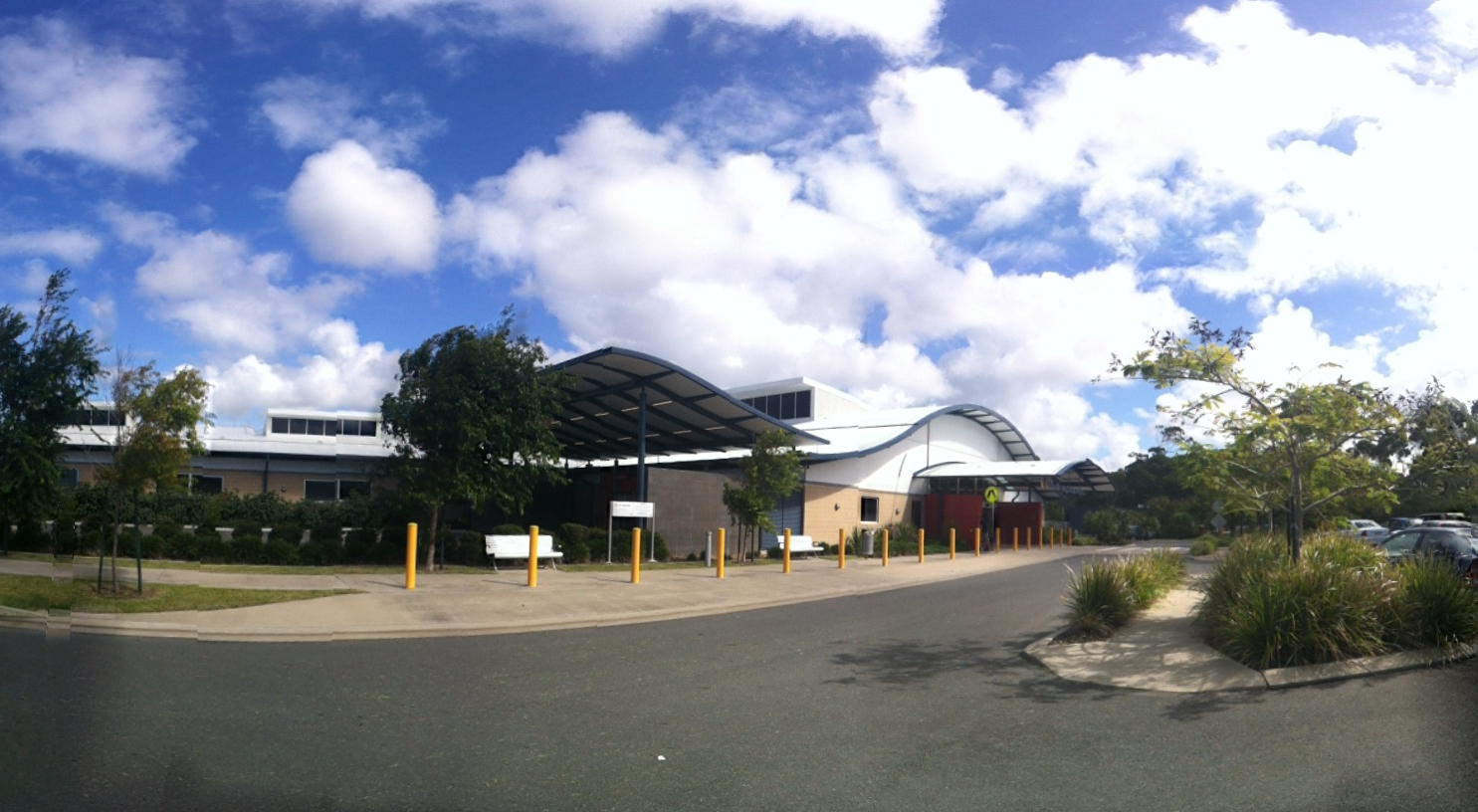
- Capricorn Coast Hospital, 2012

- Interactive map of Hidden Valley
- Coordinates: 23.1680°S 150.7188°E
- Country: Australia
- State: Queensland
- LGA: Livingstone Shire
- Location: 4.9 km (3.0 mi) SW of Yeppoon; 36.4 km (22.6 mi) NW of Rockhampton CBD; 681 km (423 mi) NNW of Brisbane

Government
  - State electorate: Keppel
  - Federal division: Capricornia

Area
  - Total: 13.2 km^{2} (5.1 sq mi)
- Elevation: 10–160 m (33–525 ft)

Population
  - Total: 879 (2021 census)
  - Density: 66.59/km^{2} (172.5/sq mi)
- Time zone: UTC+10:00 (AEST)
- Postcode: 4703
Suburbs around Hidden Valley
Barmaryee	Yeppoon	Yeppoon
Bondoola	Hidden Valley	Taroomball
Bondoola	Tanby	Tanby

Hidden Valley is a mixed-use locality in the Livingstone Shire, Queensland, Australia. In the 2021 census, Hidden Valley had a population of 879 people.

== Geography ==
The Rockhampton-Yeppoon Road (as Yeppoon Road) runs along the northern boundary.

The land use is a mixture of grazing on native vegetation, horticulture, housing and undeveloped land. Historical, the housing was rural residential in the north-east of the locality, but the increasing population reflects the recent development of suburban land parcels in the west of the locality.

== History ==
Jangga, also known as Yangga, is an Indigenous language of Central Queensland.

== Demographics ==
In the 2016 census, Hidden Valley had a population of 421 people.

In the 2021 census, Hidden Valley had a population of 879 people.

== Education ==
There are no schools in Hidden Valley. The nearest government primary schools are Yeppoon State School in neighbouring Yeppoon to the north and Taranganba State School in Taranganba to the east. The nearest government secondary school is Yeppoon State High School in Yeppoon.

== Facilities ==
Capricorn Coast Hospital & Health Service is a public hospital at 8 Hoskyn Drive (23.1437°S 150.7337°E). It includes dental services, an 24-hour emergency department, and an ambulance station.

== Amenities ==
There is a park on Naomi Drive Park (23.1460°S 150.7402°E).
