= Pacific Heights, Queensland =

Pacific Heights
- Suburb
- Interactive map of Pacific Heights
- Coordinates: 23.1002°S 150.7330°E
- Country: Australia
- State: Queensland
- LGA: Livingstone Shire
- Location: 6.3 km (3.9 mi) N of Yeppoon; 47.1 km (29.3 mi) NE of Rockhampton; 686 km (426 mi) NNW of Brisbane

Government
  - State electorate: Keppel
  - Federal division: Capricornia

Area
  - Total: 2.6 km^{2} (1.0 sq mi)

Population
  - Total: 1,111 (2021 census)
  - Density: 427/km^{2} (1,107/sq mi)
- Time zone: UTC+10:00 (AEST)
- Postcode: 4703
Suburbs around Pacific Heights
Farnborough	Farnborough	Farnborough
Adelaide Park	Pacific Heights	Farnborough
Inverness	Barlows Hill	Yeppoon

Pacific Heights is a semi-rural locality in the Livingstone Shire, Queensland, Australia. In the 2021 census, Pacific Heights had a population of 1,111 people.

== Geography ==
Pacific Heights is in the hinterland of the Capricorn Coast.

Farnborough Road is the eastern border of the locality with suburban development connecting via that road. Behind the suburban development, there is a land corridor for Panorama Drive to be developed through to the Farnborough Road roundabout.

There is some farmland and some undeveloped bushland in Pacific Heights.

== History ==
St Benedict's Catholic Primary School opened in 2009.

== Demographics ==
In the 2016 census, Pacific Heights had a population of 926 people.

In the 2021 census, Pacific Heights had a population of 1,111 people.

== Education ==
St Benedict's Catholic Primary School is a Catholic primary (Prep-6) school for boys and girls at 1 Laceys Road (23.0955°S 150.7411°E). In 2018, the school had an enrolment of 272 students with 23 teachers (18 full-time equivalent) and 13 non-teaching staff (7 full-time equivalent).

There are no government schools in Pacific Heights. The nearest government primary schools are Farnborough State School in neighbouring Farnborough to the north and Yeppoon State School in Yeppoon to the south. The nearest government secondary school is Yeppoon State High School in Yeppoon to the south.

== Amenities ==
There are a number of parks in Pacific Heights, including:

- Barnes Street Park (23.1048°S 150.7452°E)
- Bradford Park (23.1054°S 150.7416°E)
- Pacific Panorama Park (23.1015°S 150.7445°E)
- Pacific Parklands (23.1003°S 150.7413°E)
