= Yeppoon State School building =

Yeppoon State School
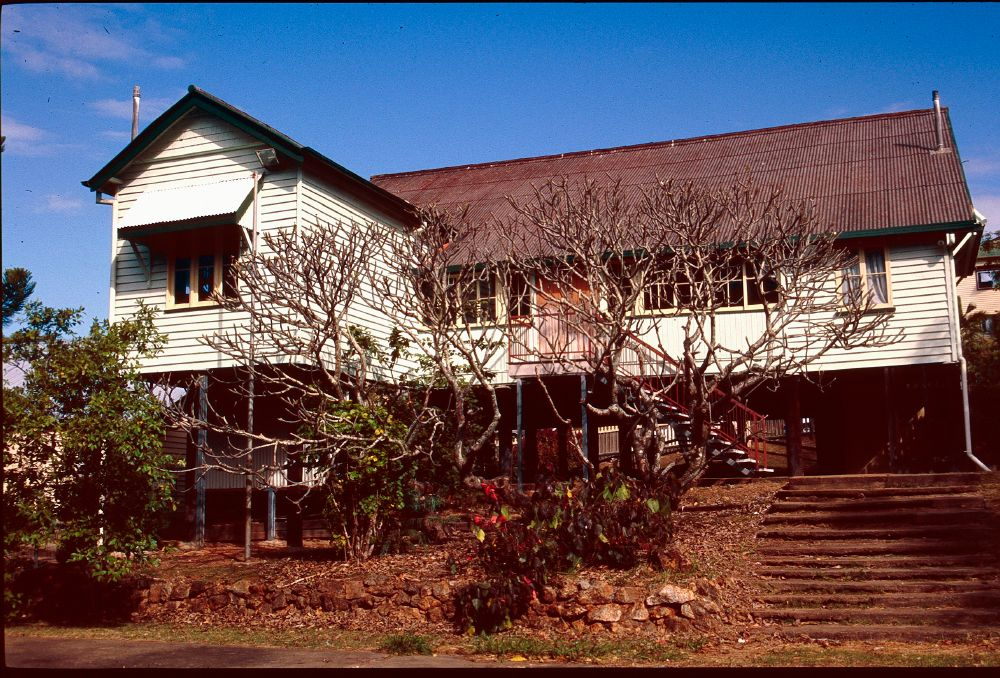
- Yeppoon State School

- Location within Queensland Location within Australia
- 23.1298°S 150.7461°E
- Location: 29 Queen Street, Yeppoon, Shire of Livingstone, Queensland, Australia

History
- Design period: 1870s–1890s (late 19th century)
- Built: 1889–1929

Site notes
- Architect: Department of Public Works (Queensland)
- Architectural style: Classicism

Queensland Heritage Register
- Official name: Yeppoon State School (former), Queen Street Community Hall
- Type: state heritage (built)
- Designated: 3 December 2003
- Reference no.: 602404
- Significant period: 1880s (historical); 1889–1920s (fabric); 1889–1971 (social)
- Significant components: school/school room

The Yeppoon State School building is a heritage-listed former state school building and now the Queen Street Community Hall at 29 Queen Street, Yeppoon, Shire of Livingstone, Queensland, Australia. It was designed by Department of Public Works (Queensland) and built from 1889 to 1929. It is also known as Queen Street Community Hall. It was added to the Queensland Heritage Register on 3 December 2003.

== History ==
The former Yeppoon State School building was constructed in 1889, following the establishment of the Yeppoon Provisional School in 1885.

In 1867, residents of Rockhampton signed a petition asking the Surveyor-General to mark out a town at the nearest point on the central Queensland coast where they might be able to enjoy a day at the beach. An area known as Bald Hills (later Yeppoon) was proclaimed a Town Reserve on 30 April 1868. Rockhampton residents also demanded that the government proclaim a second site, Emu Park, around 35 kilometres (22 mi) from Rockhampton, as a Town Reserve. It was considered by the residents that it would be necessary to cater for the future needs of the expanding town of Rockhampton. Emu Park was declared a Town Reserve on 9 January 1869.

Following its gazettal as a town, Yeppoon remained comparatively unpopular with Rockhampton residents, who preferred Emu Park, consequently, it was pastoralists and selectors who were the first to settle and develop the Yeppoon area. The land in the area was very fertile, with a yearly average rainfall higher that than of either Rockhampton or Emu Park, and by 1878, the immediate Yeppoon hinterland had been largely developed for agriculture, with the surrounding area used for grazing.

The beginning of the 1880s brought changes to the district as people began to take more of an interest in the town. Between 1881 and 1884, it was predominantly residents of the area who purchased the remaining 30 town lots. These lots had not sold at the first land sales in 1873. When an additional town area was surveyed in 1881, however, these lots had all sold out by 1885.

The first school opened in Yeppoon was a provisional school which opened in 1885 with 25 pupils. At the time, it was necessary to show that there were at least 30 pupils ready to be enrolled before a state school could be provided. By January 1889, enrolments had grown, with 60 children at the school. At this time, a new building was constructed to accommodate the larger number of children. As the first school was a provisional school, the existing building is the first state school in Yeppoon.

In January 1884, James Atherton, on behalf of the community requested that the Department of Public Instruction for a teacher to be appointed to teach the Yeppoon children. Along with the request, Atherton offered his house for the purpose.

On 7 June 1884, the application to have a provisional school established at Yeppoon was sent to the Department explaining why a school was needed. The current site was chosen (although the area was not set aside as a Reserve for School until March 1888). On 18 June 1884, the Minister for Public Instruction, Sir Samuel Griffiths, approved the application, and finally, on 4 May 1885, Provisional School number 442 opened at Yeppoon.

By September 1888, the Yeppoon community again wrote to the Department of Public Instruction, on this occasions requesting an application form for the establishment of a state school. The formal application was sent on 31 October 1888.

On 21 March 1889, a tender in the Queensland Government Gazette called for the construction of new state school buildings at Yeppoon. The new school was opened in August the same year. At this time, the old provisional school building was added to the teacher's residence in order to enlarge it.

Several extensions and additions to the school were added over the years, including a fifteen foot extension in July 1900 (possibly the extension to the north-east side of the building); other additions in January 1901; repairs in July 1911; commencement of the planting of gardens in April 1917 and new school buildings in 1918. In June 1930, tenders were called for the purchase and removal of the teacher's residence. By July 1929, tenders were invited for the construction of additions to the school, following which, an eastern wing, with two classrooms was opened.

On 10 June 1945, a public meeting was held to discuss the urgent need for representations to be made to the Minister for Education requesting that a new school on a new site be provided as both the existing school and site had become overcrowded. It was to take some time before the Department a new school site, and once again, three more classrooms were added to the eastern wing - two in 1950 and one in 1953.

Finally, in August 1955, the Department of Education acquired an area of 42 acres in Jeffries Street and the site was set aside as a school reserve. The Queen Street school became the Infants' School consisting of the 1889 building, including offices and staff rooms. The remaining buildings were moved to the Jeffries Street site to form part of the new state school. The site remained the site of the Infants' School until 1971, when it became a Reserve for Recreation Purposes and the school building became a fitness centre. The adjacent land, now a freehold block, remains as offices of the Yeppoon and District Kindergarten Association.

In July 1993, the Reserve for Recreation Purposes was rescinded and the site became a Reserve for Local Government Purposes, with a sub- purpose as a local hall. Since that time, the former Yeppoon State School building has been used as a community hall, and continues to be used regularly by various community groups.

== Description ==
The former Yeppoon State School is a single storey timber building clad with weatherboards, set on high timber stumps set into a concrete base. The building has a gabled roof running east-west, clad with asbestos cement sheeting. The building appears to have been extended on the north-east side. This section also has a gable roof clad with asbestos cement sheeting.

The building has a centrally located porch, on the southern side, with a gable roof. Timber steps, lead to a concrete landing. The central gable is infilled with timber shingles, below which is a rounded lintel with dentils. The central gable and end gables have plain bargeboards. Similar to the central gable, the end gables at the western and eastern sides of the building are infilled with timber shingles. Timber, louvred ventilation openings are located high in the western and eastern elevations. The building has verandahs to the north and south sides.

The southern elevation, the main entrance to the building, has two double timber doors leading to the main internal room. Located above the two doors are timber framed rectangular window openings with each holding three square panes of glass. The front (southern) verandah has been enclosed on the western side with two, two-pane early casement windows still in-situ. The verandah has timber balustrading with timber posts and heavy, curved timber brackets.

The western elevation has a large feature window with eight rectangular timber framed openings, divided into three levels by different types of windows. The bottom level has casements; the second level has pivoting windows and the top level has fixed windows which slope in an easterly direction toward the main room of the building. At the top of the windows, between them and on the outer wall is a panel of mesh. The window is surmounted by a timber framed hood clad with corrugated iron.

The rear (northern) verandah has been enclosed with weatherboards and louvres at the eastern end and with vertically joined timbers on the western side. The enclosed area at the western end has early timber framed, sliding glass windows in-situ. Along the eastern elevation, the later gabled extension to the building has two rectangular window openings with each holding three square panes of glass. The window is surmounted by a timber framed window hood. A similar window feature is located along the northern elevation of the later extension.

A steel and concrete staircase is located on the northern side of the building leading to concrete stairs, which in turn, lead to the rear of the site and a concrete court area.

Internally, the building is composed of one large room which was originally partitioned into two classroom. The room has two circular ceiling vents with lattice covers. Tie-rods run from the northern to southern walls at both the western and eastern ends. The ceiling is lined with timber boards and is level in the centre with the northern and southern sides sloping at an angle to the wall. The walls are also lined with timber boards.

Evidence remains of a folding partition across the centre of the building which would have divided the large room into two smaller classrooms. Hinge marks are located on vertical posts on each side along with reinforced brass holes in the floor for bolts. There are hinged flaps in the skirting boards. Some of these have their original hinges and bolts. There are four doors in the building-two on the southern side and two on the northern. The two on the southern side are original double doors, while only the door on the western end of the northern wall is an original double door. The door at the eastern end of the northern wall is a later addition.

There are two sets of four pivoting windows on the northern and southern sides. These are placed opposite each other above the doors. There are three mullions in each set of windows and each window has three panes. In each set the windows are paired and attached together with a bar so that opening one opens its partner.

Very high up on the walls there are some old hooks which may have been used to hang charts. There are four on the northern wall, one on the west and one on the east. Some of these only retain their base plate and the hook has been broken off.

Toilets, constructed of besser block, are located in the central western side of the undercroft area. The north-eastern corner of the undercroft has also been enclosed with timber flooring and a timber frame clad with corrugated iron. The site on which the hall is located slopes in a northerly direction away from Queen Street, with Queen Street sloping from east to west. The grounds are uneven with rocky outcrops and roughly grassed with remnant original plantings. Terraces have been constructed with dry-stone rubble walls. Mature plantings on the site include two large, frangipani trees as well as shrubs such as loquats.

A stone retaining wall has also been constructed on the southern side of the site with timber balustrading running east-west indicating the extent of the wall. A picket fence is located at the front of the building along the Queen Street frontage.

== Heritage listing ==
The former Yeppoon State School building was listed on the Queensland Heritage Register on 3 December 2003 having satisfied the following criteria.

The place is important in demonstrating the evolution or pattern of Queensland's history.

Constructed in 1889, the former Yeppoon State School is significant as the first state school established in Yeppoon, following the establishment of the provisional school in 1885. The former school building provides evidence of the growth of the Yeppoon and surrounding area during the 1880s due to the increasing attraction of coastal living. The former Yeppoon State School is further significant providing evidence of the development of the education system throughout Queensland.

The place is important in demonstrating the principal characteristics of a particular class of cultural places.

Largely intact, the former Yeppoon State School is significant as an example of a building type developed by the Department of Public Works for the Department of Public Instruction. The former Yeppoon State School building demonstrates the principal characteristics of a building of its type by its form and use of materials, reflecting the ways in which architects of the Works Department have addressed problems of light and ventilation in response to climatic conditions, particularly the use of large feature windows and hinged skirting boards to allow for cross ventilation.

The place is important because of its aesthetic significance.

Its simple form and materials contribute to the aesthetic significance of the place and the contribution of the building to the Queen Street streetscape.

The place has a strong or special association with a particular community or cultural group for social, cultural or spiritual reasons.

The former Yeppoon State School is important for its connection with the community in and around Yeppoon as a provider of public education for several generations. The former Yeppoon State School is further significant for its later use as community hall.
