= Woodbury, Queensland =

Woodbury
- Suburb
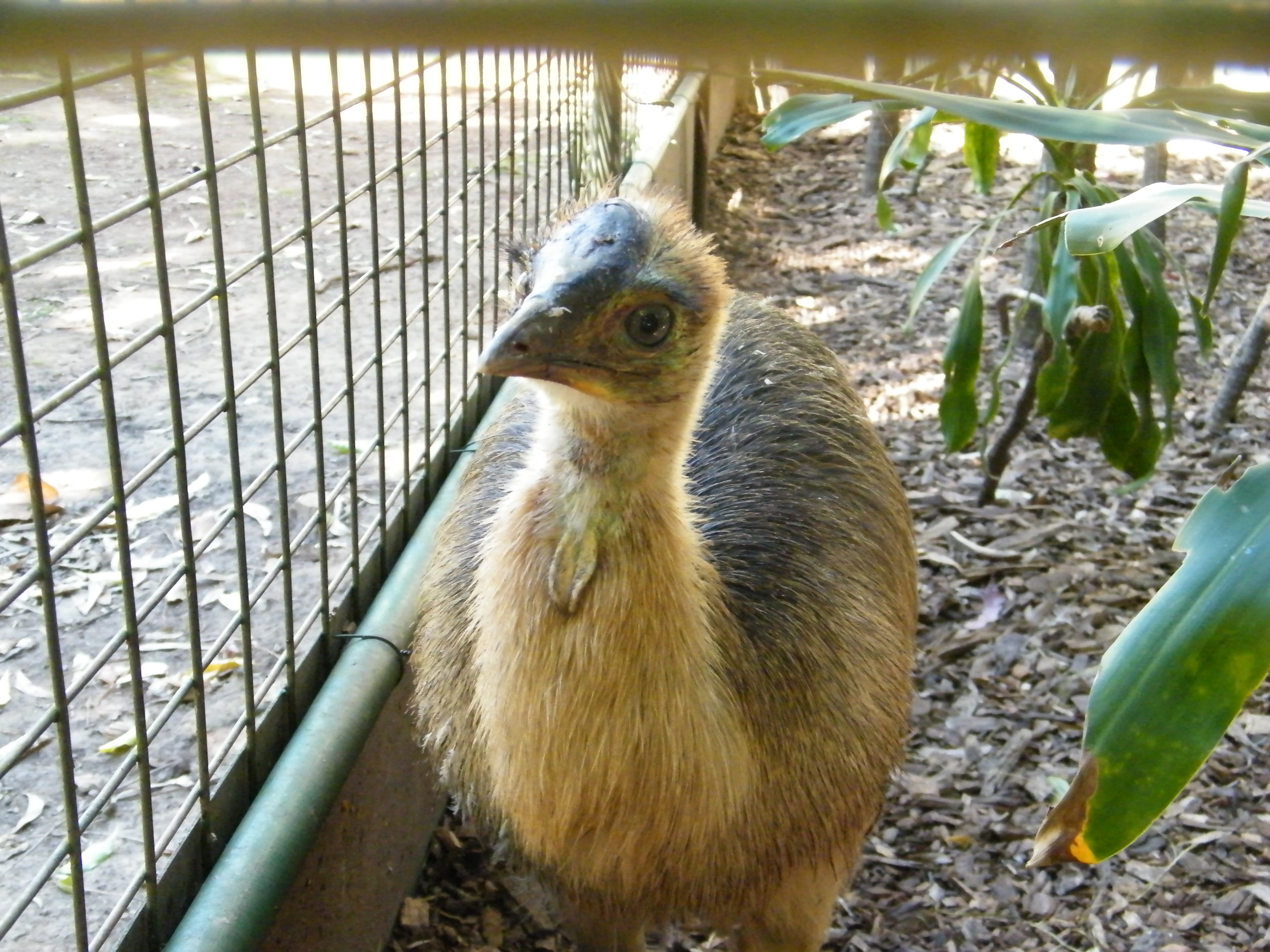
- Southern cassowary chick at the Cooberrie Park Wildlife Sanctuary, 2011

- Interactive map of Woodbury
- Coordinates: 22.9802°S 150.7172°E
- Country: Australia
- State: Queensland
- LGA: Livingstone Shire
- Location: 15.4 km (9.6 mi) N of Yeppoon; 52.3 km (32.5 mi) NE of Rockhampton; 691 km (429 mi) NNW of Brisbane

Government
  - State electorate: Keppel
  - Federal division: Capricornia

Area
  - Total: 105.3 km^{2} (40.7 sq mi)

Population
  - Total: 514 (2021 census)
  - Density: 4.881/km^{2} (12.642/sq mi)
- Time zone: UTC+10:00 (AEST)
- Postcode: 4703
Suburbs around Woodbury
Byfield	Stockyard	Coral Sea
Maryvale	Woodbury	Coral Sea
Bungundarra	Farnborough	Farnborough

Woodbury is a coastal locality in the Livingstone Shire, Queensland, Australia. In the 2021 census, Woodbury had a population of 514 people.

== History ==
Woodbury Provisional School opened in 1923. It closed in 1925.

== Demographics ==
In the 2016 census, Woodbury had a population of 434 people.

In the 2021 census, Woodbury had a population of 514 people.

== Education ==
There are no schools in Woodbury. The nearest government primary school is Farnborough State School in neighbouring Farnborough to the south. The nearest government secondary school is Yeppoon State High School in Yeppoon to the south. There are also non-government schools in Yeppoon and its suburbs.

== Attractions ==
Cooberrie Park Wildlife Sanctuary is at 9 Stones Road (23.0333°S 150.6875°E). It aims to rehabilitate sick, injured or orphaned native animals so they can be returned to the wild. If an animal cannot be returned to the wild, it remains at the sanctuary to educate visitors about that species. The animals include koalas, kangaroos, crocodiles, and cassowaries.

== Facilities ==
Woodbury Water Treatment Plant is 172 Byfield Road (23.0088°S 150.6863°E). It is one of two water treatment plants operated by the Livingstone Shire Council to provide a safe water supply to the shire.
