= Farnborough, Queensland =

Farnborough
- Suburb
- Interactive map of Farnborough
- Coordinates: 23.0269°S 150.7613°E
- Country: Australia
- State: Queensland
- LGA: Shire of Livingstone
- Location: 7.7 km (4.8 mi) N of Yeppoon; 48.6 km (30.2 mi) NE of Rockhampton CBD; 697 km (433 mi) NNW of Brisbane

Government
  - State electorate: Keppel
  - Federal division: Capricornia

Area
  - Total: 147.9 km^{2} (57.1 sq mi)

Population
  - Total: 469 (2021 census)
  - Density: 3.171/km^{2} (8.213/sq mi)
- Time zone: UTC+10:00 (AEST)
- Postcode: 4703
Suburbs around Farnborough
Woodbury	Stockyard	Coral Sea
Bungundarra	Farnborough	Bangalee
Adelaide Park	Pacific Heights	Coral Sea; Yeppoon

Farnborough is a coastal rural locality in the Livingstone Shire, Queensland, Australia. In the 2021 census, Farnborough had a population of 469 people.

== Geography ==
Farnborough is the northernmost extent of the Capricorn Coast.

Farnborough's eastern boundary is a 17 km long beachfront onto the Coral Sea. However, the principal access to the beach is via Bangalee, a small beachside locality within Farnborough. In the southern part of Farnborough, there are a number of large rural residential blocks. Most of the northern part of Farnborough is occupied by the Capricorn International Resort which includes a golf course. The northernmost tip of Farnborough is a mixture of Crown land and the Byfield National Park.

== History ==
The short-lived sugar industry on the Capricorn Coast commenced in Farnborough. William Broome who had property a few kilometres north of Yeppoon established the Yeppoon Sugar Company in 1883. Having attracted investors, he built a sugar crushing mill in Farnborough (23.0791°S 150.7368°E). Broome did not grow sugarcane himself and relied on others to grow it. As good prices were paid for sugar at that time, sugar cane plantations were developed at Farnborough and also at Cawarral and Joskeleigh.

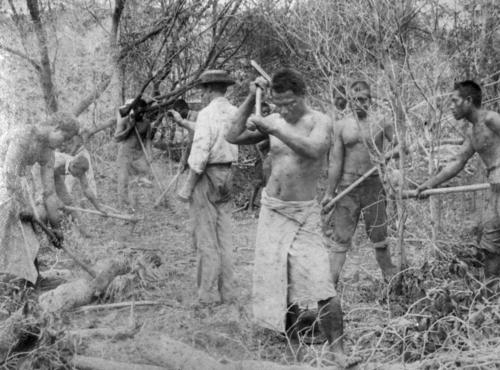
Kanaka indentured labourers clearing scrub at Farnborough in 1895

In 1889, there was a bad growing season and insufficient sugarcane was grown to make the mill profitable. The banks foreclosed, and the business was taken over by the company's Rockhampton backers. They auctioned it promptly at a significant loss to two of the mill's former shareholders. In 1891 Rutherford Armstrong became the manager and trebled production over several good seasons.

In 1902, a failure of the sugar crop led to no crushing occurring at the mill which closed in 1903.

Farnborough Provisional School opened on 9 June 1903. On 25 March 1913, it became Farnborough State School.

In 1971, a Japanese syndicate headed by Yohachiro Iwasaki acquired hundreds of thousands of hectares of beachfront land including wetlands in Farnborough to build a resort. The acquisition caused widespread outrage, given that Australian citizens and developers had been refused to buy the land on several occasions prior, and also due to the belief that the deal was corrupted by kickbacks at the Queensland Government level. Anti-Japanese sentiment ran rife including the printing of fake money featuring Mr Iwasaki's caricatured face with a currency value of 4 Grabs, a play on the term "up for grabs". When construction began, the Yeppoon RSL club posted an anti-Japanese display on their lawns. Local discontent reached its climax on 29 November 1980, the day of the Queensland Election, when a bomb was set off at Iwasaki Resort. Two men were charged but acquitted. The project continued regardless. Originally known as the Iwasaki Resort, it later became the Capricorn International Resort. Rydges managed the resort until 2011, when the lease was taken over by Mercure.

== Demographics ==
In the 2016 census, Farnborough had a population of 476 people. This decreased in the 2021 census, Farnborough had a population of 469 people.

== Education ==
Farnborough State School is a government primary (Prep-6) school for boys and girls at 8 Hinz Avenue (23.0763°S 150.7371°E). In 2018, the school had an enrolment of 310 students with 19 teachers (17 full-time equivalent) and 15 non-teaching staff (10 full-time equivalent).

There are no secondary schools in Farnborough. The nearest government secondary school is Yeppoon State High School in neighbouring Yeppoon to the south-east.

== See also ==
- List of sugar mills in Queensland
