= Shire of Livingstone =

- Local government area
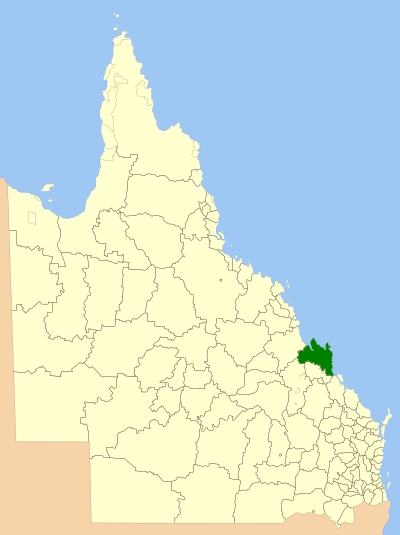
- Location within Queensland

- Interactive map of Shire of Livingstone
- Coordinates: 23.12°S 150.745°E
- Country: Australia
- State: Queensland
- Region: Central Queensland
- Established: 2014
- Council seat: Yeppoon

Government
  - Mayor: Andrew Darryl Ireland
  - State electorates: Keppel; Mirani
  - Federal division: Capricornia

Area
  - Total: 11,758 km^{2} (4,540 sq mi)

Population
  - Total: 39,398 (2021 census)
  - Density: 3.35074/km^{2} (8.6784/sq mi)
- Website: Shire of Livingstone
LGAs around Shire of Livingstone
Isaac	Pacific Ocean	Pacific Ocean
Isaac	Shire of Livingstone	Pacific Ocean
Central Highlands	Rockhampton	Rockhampton

The Shire of Livingstone is a local government area located in the Capricornia region of Central Queensland, Queensland, Australia, to the immediate north and east of the regional city of Rockhampton. The shire, administered from the coastal town of Yeppoon, covers an area of 11,758 square kilometres (4,539.8 sq mi), and existed as a local government entity from 1879 until 2008, when it amalgamated with several other councils to become the Rockhampton Region. The Shire was re-established on 1 January 2014 following a successful de-amalgamation referendum in 2013.

Industry within the shire is diverse. Timber is harvested from extensive pine plantations near Byfield in the north. Significant pineapple production takes place within the shire, as well as other agricultural crops. Tourism is increasingly becoming a mainstay of the area, with Keppel Bay and the nearby islands a major drawcard, and more than half of the Shire's population lives in the coastal area centred on Yeppoon and Emu Park. The coastal strip within the shire is known as the Capricorn Coast. The Shoalwater Bay Military Training Area is also located within the shire.

In the 2021 census, the Shire of Livingstone had a population of 39,398 people.

== History ==
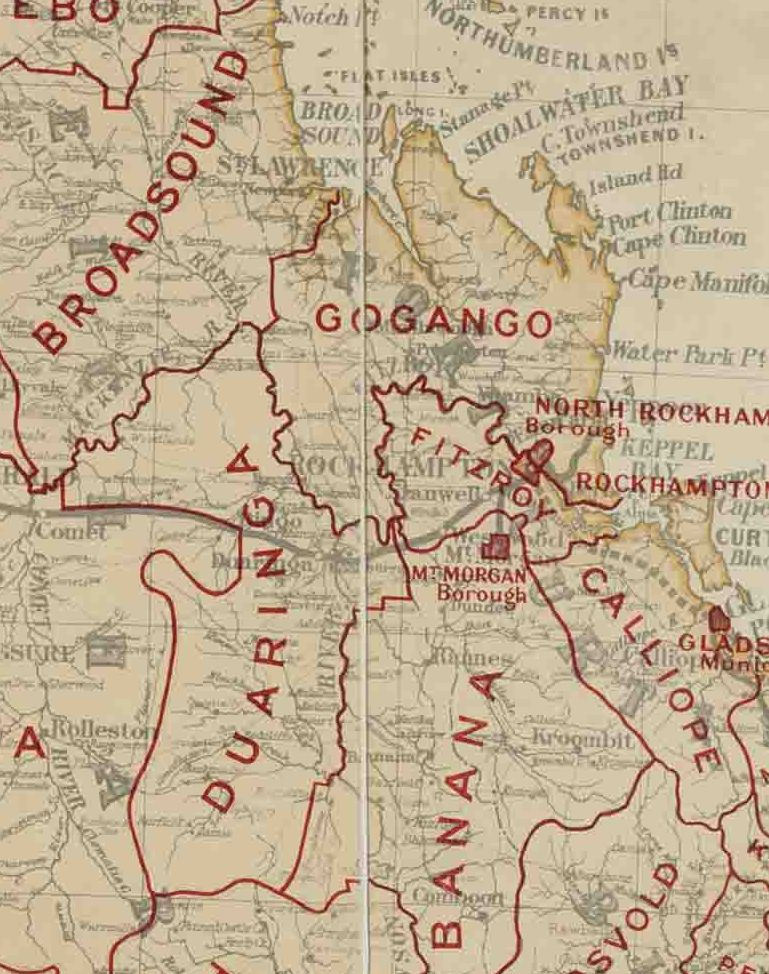
Map of Gogango Division and adjacent local government areas, March 1902

On 11 November 1879, the Gogango Division was established as one of 74 divisions around Queensland under the Divisional Boards Act 1879 with a population of 5023. It covered an area of 16,239 km^{2} (6,270 sq mi) surrounding but not including the town of Rockhampton—an area significantly greater than the modern Rockhampton Regional Council covers. Its administrative centre was in North Rockhampton.

Capital and people came to the area in greater numbers after the discovery of gold in 1882 at Mount Morgan, about 20 kilometres (12 mi) south of Rockhampton.

A bridge was built spanning the Fitzroy River in 1882, and a year later in September 1883, the Borough of North Rockhampton was proclaimed.

On 3 March 1892, part of subdivision 2 of the Broadsound Division was transferred to subdivision 3 of the Gogango Division, while another part of subdivision 2 of the Broadsound Division was transferred to the Duaringa Division.

On 6 April 1899, the part of the Gogango Division south of the Fitzroy River split away to form the Fitzroy Division.

With the passage of the Local Authorities Act 1902, Gogango Division became the Shire of Gogango on 31 March 1903, and on 8 August 1903 it was renamed Shire of Livingstone.

On 1 July 1984, the neighbouring City of Rockhampton grew to include Parkhurst (which had previously been within the Shire of Livingstone) to encompass the area where Rochampton's new water treatment facility was being constructed..

=== 2008 amalgamation ===
On 15 March 2008, under the Local Government (Reform Implementation) Act 2007 passed by the Parliament of Queensland on 10 August 2007, the Shire of Livingstone merged with the City of Rockhampton and the Shires of Mount Morgan and Fitzroy to form the Rockhampton Region.

In 2012, a proposal was made to de-amalgamate the Shire of Livingstone from the Rockhampton Region. On 9 March 2013, the citizens of the former Livingstone shire voted in a referendum to de-amalgamate. The Shire of Livingstone was re-established on 1 January 2014.

=== 2019 proposal to transfer three localities ===
In 2019, a proposal was put forward that the localities of Glenlee, Rockyview and Glendale (all within the Shire of Livingstone) should become part of the Rockhampton Region. The main rationales for the change were that these localities lay in the path of suburban growth to the north of Rockhampton and that the residents of these localities used the services and facilities within the Rockhampton Region rather than those of the Shire of Livingstone. The proposal highlighted the different planning priorities between the two local governments with Rockhampton Region wishing to develop more suburban housing and associated amenities with smaller land parcels, while the Shire of Livingstone preferred to have larger land parcels to retain its rural and rural residential character. Given the unpopularity of the forced 2008 amalgamation, there was suspicion among shire residents that the proposal was another attempt to achieve amalgamation through progressive loss of localities to the Rockhampton Region. Following a number of investigations and public consultations, it was decided in October 2022 not to change the local government boundaries.

=== Proposed name change ===
Since de-amalgamation from Rockhampton Regional Council, there have been regular proposals for the shire to change its name. The name of Livingstone is believed to have been derived from Livingstone County in New South Wales which was named after Scottish explorer David Livingstone. However, because of the name's lack of geographical context, it has been argued by local government leaders and local organisations that the shire suffers from poor name recognition.

In March 2023, Livingstone mayor Andy Ireland requested a report detailing the positives and negatives associated with a name change. He expressed frustration at regularly being asked to explain where the Shire of Livingstone was, including during meetings with senior Australian Defence Force personnel and cabinet ministers from the Federal Government. Former mayor Bill Ludwig had previously expressed a similar sentiment in 2018, stating: "In Brisbane, people would be flat out knowing where Livingstone is, but as Capricorn Coast Regional Council, they would know it's a coastal destination."

Ireland also said that a change to the Capricorn Coast Region would assist with tourism marketing, with local tourism operators and organisation already having expressed a preference for such a name. However, this proposal has already received opposition from residents of rural towns situated away from the coast such as The Caves, Marlborough and Ogmore. The associated costs with changing the name of Livingstone has also prompted concern from the community.

== Towns and localities ==
The Shire of Livingstone includes the following settlements:

Rockhampton area:

- Glendale
- Glenlee
- Ironpot
- Lakes Creek^{1}
- Mount Chalmers
- Nankin
- Nerimbera
- Rockyview

Yeppoon-Keppel area:

- Adelaide Park
- Bangalee^{2}
- Barlows Hill
- Barmaryee
- Causeway Lake
- Cooee Bay
- Coral Sea
- Emu Park
- Farnborough
- Hidden Valley
- Inverness
- Joskeleigh
- Keppel Sands
- Kinka Beach
- Lammermoor
- Meikleville Hill
- Mulambin
- Pacific Heights
- Rosslyn
- Taranganba
- Taroomball
- Yeppoon
- Zilzie

Other areas:

- Barmoya
- Bondoola
- Bungundarra
- Byfield
- Byfield NP
- Canal Creek
- Canoona
- Cawarral
- Cobraball
- Coorooman
- Coowonga
- Etna Creek
- Great Keppel Island
- Greenlake
- Jardine
- Kunwarara
- Lake Mary
- Marlborough
- Maryvale^{3}
- Milman
- Mount Gardiner
- Mulara
- Ogmore
- Princhester
- Rossmoya
- Sandringham
- Shoalwater
- Shoalwater Bay
- Stanage
- Stockyard
- Tanby
- The Caves
- The Keppels
- Thompson Point
- Tungamull
- Wattlebank
- Weerriba
- Woodbury
- Yaamba

^{1} - shared with Rockhampton Region
^{2} - not to be confused with Bangalee in the Gladstone Region
^{3} - not to be confused with Maryvale in the Southern Downs Region

== Climate ==
The city has a tropical savanna climate (Köppen: Aw), marking the southern boundary of this climatic zone, more precisely in the Byfield National Park.

== Libraries ==
The Livingstone Shire Council operates public libraries in Byfield, Marlborough, Emu Park, and Yeppoon. It also supports volunteer-operated libraries in Mount Chalmers and Stanage Bay.

== Demographics ==
Year	Population	Notes
1933	6,472	
1947	6,452	
1954	7,031	
1961	7,320	
1966	7,780	
1971	9,595	
1976	11,634	
1981	15,711	
1986	15,886	
1991	19,334	
1996	24,796	
2001 census	26,575	
2006 census	28,870	
2011		Shire of Livingstone did not exist as it was amalgamated into Rockhampton Region.
2016 census	36,272	
2021 census	39,398	

== Chairmen and mayors ==
Incorporating non-consecutive terms into the years of representation, the following were the chairmen and mayors of the Shire of Livingstone from its beginnings as the Gogango Divisional Board in 1879 to the end of its first incarnation in 2008:

- 1880 – 1898: Henry Jones
- 1882 – 1883: William Pattison
- 1883 – 1888: John Murray
- 1885 – 1886: Robert Lyons
- 1888 – 1902: James Atherton
- 1889 – 1891: John O'Shanesy
- 1891 – 1901: Henry Beak
- 1893 – 1895: Duncan McDonald
- 1900 – 1901: Jabez Wakefield
- 1902 – 1910: William Toft
- 1904 – 1909: Arthur Leslie Macdonald
- 1905 – 1908: Arthur Horatio Parnell
- 1910 – 1911: Thomas Henry John Atherton
- 1911 – 1913: Roderick Thomas Haylock
- 1913 – 1930: Thomas Smith
- 1915 – 1917: Samuel Thomasson
- 1921 – 1927: William Beak
- 1930 – 1933: William Francis Clayton
- 1933 – 1936: Owen Daniel
- 1936 – 1961: William Todd
- 1961 – 1982: Henry Robert Beak
- 1964 – 1970: John Barrett Hinz
- 1976 – 1985: Royston Warwick Wall
- 1985 – 1986: Lindsay Hartwig
- 1986 – 1991: Thomas Arthur John Bowen
- 1991 – 2000: Barbara Ann Wildin
- 2000 – 2008: Bill Ludwig

The following were the mayors of Shire of Livingstone from the beginning of its second incarnation in 2014 to the present day:

- 2014 – 2020 : Bill Ludwig
- 2020 – 2024: Andrew Darryl Ireland
- 2024 – present : Adam John Belot

== Election results ==
=== 2024 ===
2024 Queensland local elections: Livingstone
Party	Candidate	Votes	%	±%
Independent	Glenda Mather (elected)	12,635	9.07	
Independent	Pat Eastwood (elected)	11,975	8.59	
Independent	Lance Warcon (elected)	11,323	8.12	
Independent	Rhodes Watson (elected)	10,936	7.85	
Independent	Andrea Friend (elected)	10,816	7.76	
Independent	Wade Rothery (elected)	10,285	7.38	
Independent	Trish Bowman	10,283	7.38	
Independent	Bill Ludwig	10,246	7.35	
Independent	Helen Schweikert	9,629	6.91	
Independent	Jillian Neyland	7,300	5.24	
Independent	Kristan Casuscelli	6,977	5.01	
Independent	Clint Swadling	6,700	4.81	
Independent	Brett Svendsen	6,459	4.63	
Independent	Cameron Kinsey	4,874	3.50	
Independent	Paul Mitchell	4,840	3.47	
Independent	Mike Decman	4,096	2.94	
Total formal votes		139,374	100.0	
Total formal ballots		23,229	92.09	
Informal ballots		1,995	7.91	
Turnout		25,224		
