= Yeppoon =

- Town
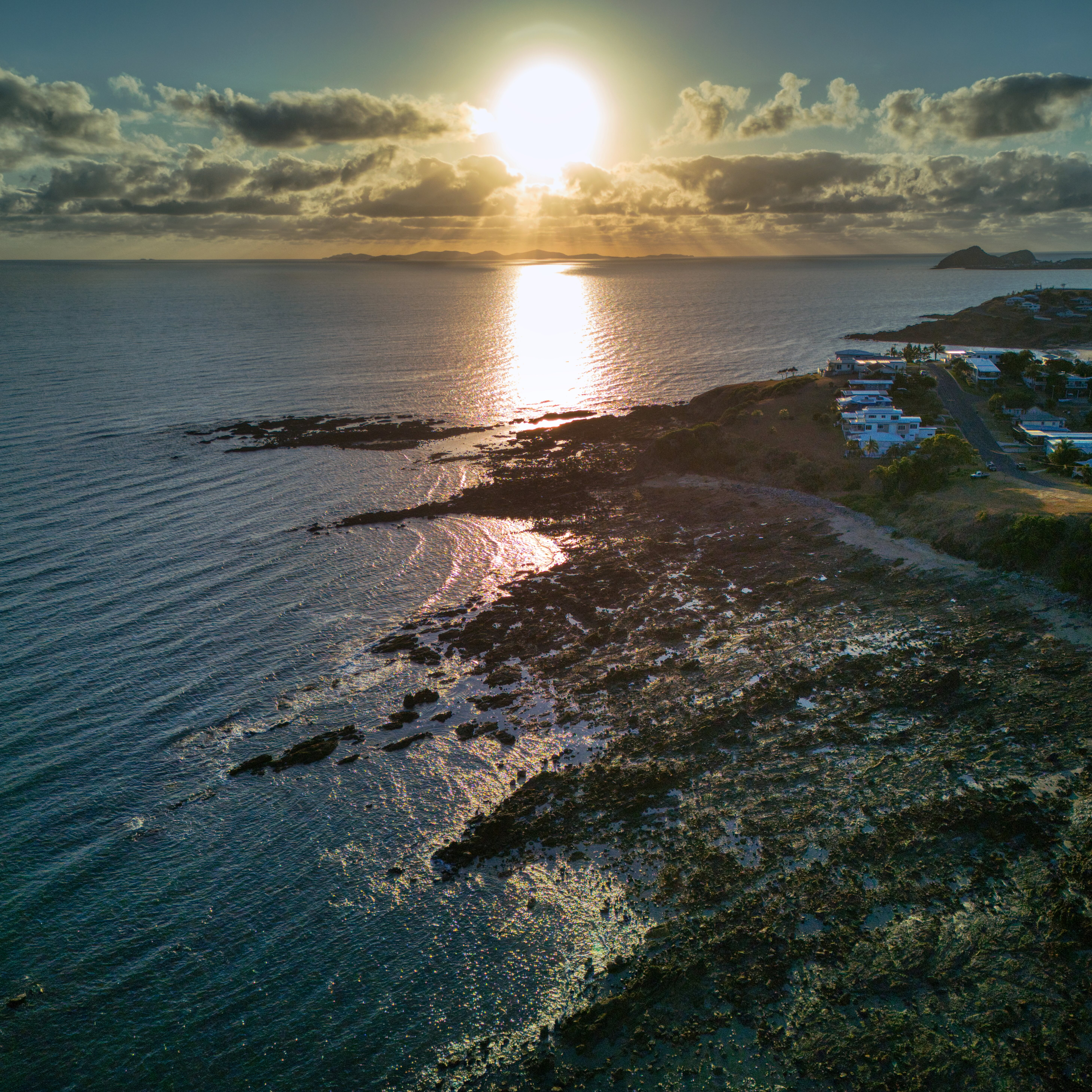
- Yeppoon beach

- Interactive map of Yeppoon
- Coordinates: 23.1288°S 150.7444°E
- Country: Australia
- State: Queensland
- LGA: Shire of Livingstone
- Location: 21.2 km (13.2 mi) NNW of Emu Park; 40.9 km (25.4 mi) NW of Rockhampton; 672 km (418 mi) NNW of Brisbane

Government
  - State electorate: Keppel
  - Federal division: Capricornia

Area
  - Total: 27.6 km^{2} (10.7 sq mi)
- Elevation: 6 m (20 ft)

Population
  - Total: 7,037 (2021 census)
  - Density: 255.0/km^{2} (660.4/sq mi)
- Time zone: UTC+10:00 (AEST)
- Postcode: 4703
- Mean max temp: 25.9 °C (78.6 °F)
- Mean min temp: 18.5 °C (65.3 °F)
- Annual rainfall: 824.9 mm (32.48 in)
Localities around Yeppoon
Pacific Heights; Inverness	Barlows Hill; Meikleville Hill	Farnborough
Barmaryee	Yeppoon	Coral Sea
Hidden Valley	Taroom Ball; Taranganba	Cooee Bay

Yeppoon (/jəˈpuːn/) is a coastal town and locality in the Shire of Livingstone, Queensland, Australia, situated on the traditional lands of the Darumbal people, who are the Indigenous custodians and Native Title holders of the Rockhampton and Capricorn Coast region. The town name "Yeppoon" derives from a Darumbal word yappun, meaning "place where the waters meet". Yeppoon is renowned for its beaches, tropical climate, and the islands out on the bay. Located 41 kilometres (25 mi) from the city of Rockhampton, Yeppoon is the seat of the Shire of Livingstone and the principal town on the Capricorn Coast, a string of seaside communities stretching more than 150 kilometres (93 mi) from north to south. The beaches and shallow coves provide a destination both for tourists and retirees settling down in Central Queensland. Offshore, there are 27 islands including Great Keppel Island which is 20 kilometres (12 mi) from Yeppoon. In the 2021 census, the locality of Yeppoon had a population of 7,037 people; this does not include any neighbouring suburbs.

== Geography ==
Yeppoon is located on Keppel Bay which opens to the Coral Sea, around 700 kilometres (430 mi) north of the state capital, Brisbane, and 40 kilometres (25 mi) from Rockhampton City. It is located within the local government area of Shire of Livingstone in Central Queensland. Between 2008 and 2013, it was within the Rockhampton Region).

The Rockhampton–Yeppoon Road (as Yeppoon Road) runs along part of the southern boundary.

== History ==
=== Indigenous people ===
In 1802, Darumbal people first made contact with Matthew Flinders as he sailed up the east coast of Queensland, but it wasn't until 1853 that the first Europeans - pastoralist brothers Charles and William Archer - ventured across land onto Darumbal Country. By 1854 and subsequently, Darumbal People had started being removed from their Traditional Country to government-run missions, such as 200km away at Woorabinda or 451km away at Cherbourg. They were violently "dispersed" and treated harshly, bringing in a period of great change for these people, yet in 1855, it was recorded that there were still 3,000 of them living on country, and by 1900 there were still 100 surviving in the local area, who became grandparents of subsequent Darumbal generations.

=== Schools ===
Yeppoon Provisional School opened on 4 May 1885 and became Yeppoon State School on 1 October 1889. Originally in Queen Street, it was relocated in 1957 to Tucker Street.

St Ursula's College, a Catholic day and boarding school for girls, was established on 12 March 1918 by the Presentation Sisters.

St Brendan's College, a Catholic day and boarding school for boys, was established on 8 October 1939 by the Christian Brothers.

Yeppoon Infants State School opened on 24 January 1955, but closed in 1968.

Yeppoon State High School opened on 28 January 1969.

=== Events in the town ===
The Bay View Tower motel and restaurant become Yeppoon first high-rise building in 1986.

In 1991, remains of 3 Darumbal men and 2 Darumbal women were repatriated to local traditional owners, and laid to rest on country. A Native Title claim was commenced in 1993, registered in 1997, and Darumbal Native Title was recognised by the Federal Court in 2016 and 2023, encompassing land in and around Rockhampton, Raglan, Yeppoon and Marlborough.

On 20 February 2015, severe tropical cyclone Marcia crossed the Capricorn Coast near Shoalwater Bay as a category 5 Cyclone. The storm damaged homes, uprooted trees, and brought down powerlines.

The Yeppoon Public Library was opened in 1990 and went through a major refurbishment in 2017.

Yeppoon is within the local government area of Shire of Livingstone (between 2008 and 2013, it was within the Rockhampton Region following a local government amalgamation that was reversed in 2014).

== Demographics ==
In the 2016 census, the locality of Yeppoon had a population of 6,334 people.

In the 2021 census, the locality of Yeppoon had a population of 7,037 people; this does not include any neighbouring suburbs.

Also in the 2021 census, the Livingstone local government area (LGA) had a total population of 39,398 persons, of whom 2,118 (5.38%) identified as Aboriginal.

== Heritage listings ==
Yeppoon has a number of heritage-listed buildings, including:

- Yeppoon railway station, James Street (23.1283°S 150.7429°E)
- Yeppoon War Memorial, Normanby Street (23.1299°S 150.7464°E)
- former Yeppoon State School building, 29 Queen Street (23.1298°S 150.7461°E)
- current Yeppoon State School, Tucker Street (23.1259°S 150.7371°E)

Aboriginal heritage sites include:

- Gai-i (mountain), formerly Mt Wheeler, and Gawula (surrounding land)

== Governance ==
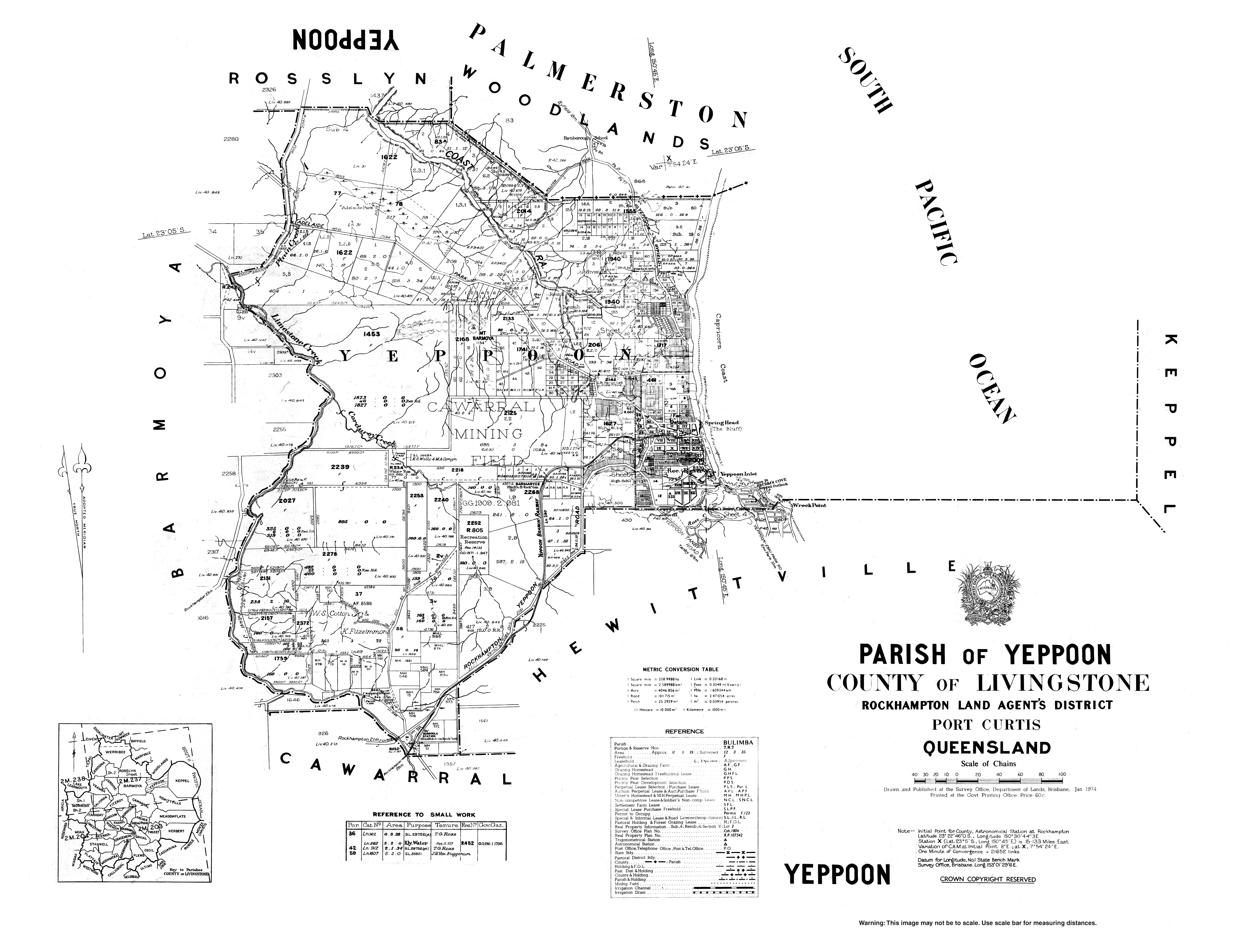
Cadastral map of the Parish of Yeppoon displaying real property information and Administrative Areas including Parish; County and Land Agents District

In 1879, the Gogango Division was established as one of 74 divisions in Queensland under the Divisional Boards Act 1879. The Gogango Divisional Board's scope of authority comprised a large area north and east of Rockhampton. While the Division was administered in Rockhampton, a locally appointed body, the Yeppoon Progress Association, met once a month to look after the minor requirements of the town.

The discovery of gold brought a huge influx of people to the region, and the various boards broke up into smaller administrative bodies to better service the growing population. In 1903, the Gogango Divisional Board was renamed Shire of Livingstone.

The boundaries of the new shire remained largely unchanged until 1984, when outlying districts including the suburbs of Nerimbera and Parkhurst were ceded to Livingstone's larger neighbour, City of Rockhampton. Continued growth in both Local Government Authorities became a contentious subject from then on, which caused much political tension, until finally in 2007, local conflicts came to a head with the tabling before the Parliament of Queensland of the proposed Local Government (Reform Implementation) Act 2007.

The Act passed, and on 15 March 2008, Livingstone Shire merged with Fitzroy Shire, Mount Morgan Shire, and Rockhampton City to form the new local government area, Rockhampton Region. This forced amalgamation caused political tension. Following a majority vote by residents to restore the Shire of Livingstone, on 1 January 2014, the Shire of Livingstone was re-established with its 2008 boundaries with its seat at Yeppoon.

== Education ==
Yeppoon State School is a government primary (Early Childhood to Year 6) school for boys and girls in 14–16 Tucker Street (23.1253°S 150.7379°E). In 2015, the school had an enrolment of 320 students with 30 teachers (24 full-time equivalent) and 23 non-teaching staff (14 full-time equivalent). In 2018, the school had an enrolment of 320 students with 28 teachers (24 full-time equivalent) and 16 non-teaching staff (12 full-time equivalent). It includes a special education program.

Yeppoon State High School is a government secondary (7–12) school for boys and girls at 30 Rawlings Street (23.1349°S 150.7355°E). In 2015, the school had an enrolment of 1,006 students with 84 teachers (81 full-time equivalent) and 44 non-teaching staff (32 full-time equivalent). In 2018, the school had an enrolment of 1,033 students with 88 teachers (86 full-time equivalent) and 41 non-teaching staff (31 full-time equivalent).

St Ursula's College is a Catholic secondary (7–12) school for girls at 42–62 Queen Street (23.1300°S 150.7434°E). In 2018, the school had an enrolment of 393 students with 36 teachers (32 full-time equivalent) and 30 non-teaching staff (18 full-time equivalent).

St Brendan's College is a Catholic secondary (7–12) school for boys at 139 Adelaide Park Road (23.1162°S 150.7300°E). In 2018, the school had an enrolment of 614 students with 53 teachers (52 full-time equivalent) and 44 non-teaching staff (34 full-time equivalent).

== Amenities ==
The Livingstone Shire Council operates the Yeppoon Library on 84 John Street, Yeppoon.

The Yeppoon branch of the Queensland Country Women's Association meets at the RSL Hall at 5 Normanby Street.

The Livingstone Shire council has also installed a waterpark on the foreshore called the Keppel Kraken, which features interactive water features and play areas for children. The shire also operates The Yeppoon Lagoon, a 2,500 square metres (27,000 sq ft) resort style lagoon pool located in the old council building site, right on the water front. The lagoon includes a shallow children's play area, and informal lap pool and an infinity edge with views over the Keppel islands.

Yeppoon Wesleyan Methodist Church is at 1 Fred Lawn Drive (23.1416°S 150.7337°E). It is part of the Wesleyan Methodist Church.

=== Shopping ===
Yeppoon has a number of shopping centres.

- Yeppoon Central
- Keppel Bay Plaza
- Yeppoon CBD
- Tanby Road District

=== Healthcare ===
- Capricorn Coast Hospital

== Media ==
Although mainly served by media from nearby Rockhampton, there is a small selection of local media based on the Capricorn Coast.

Until 2020, Yeppoon had its own weekly newspaper called The Capricorn Coast Mirror, which was started by locals John and Suzy Watson in 1983. The Capricorn Coast Mirror was an offshoot to the region's daily newspaper The Morning Bulletin, focusing on news and issues directly relevant to communities throughout Livingstone Shire and the Capricorn Coast. However, in 2020, The Mirror was one of 36 small newspapers in Australia which were closed entirely by News Corp Australia.

An independent news magazine called The Spectator is published locally on the Capricorn Coast and issued fortnightly. It was also established by Suzy and John Watson as an independent alternative for news in the Livingstone Shire.

Keppel FM (formerly 4NAG) is Yeppoon's local community radio station which has locally based on-air presenters hosting a variety of special interest programming each day from a studio in Yeppoon. The station was founded in 1998 and broadcasts to the Livingstone Shire on 91.3 FM.

== Sport ==
The local rugby league team is the Yeppoon Seagulls, established 1968. The club competes in the Rockhampton District Rugby League competition. Yeppoon is home to prominent Rugby league breeding ground St. Brendan's College. Professional players Paul Bowman, Casey Conway, Tom Hewitt, PJ Marsh, Shane Marteene, Julian O'Neill, Matthew Scott, Jake Granville, Corey Oates, Dave Taylor, Ben Hunt and Harry Grant are all St. Brendan's alumni.

The Capricorn Coast Football Club founded in 1972 competes in the local soccer competition. The Yepoon Swans, established in 1981 as Cap Coast, play out of Swan Park and compete in AFL Capricornia. The senior men's team set the record for the most consecutive wins in an Australian rules football competition, remaining undefeated for 8 years and 128 matches achieving 8 straight premierships.

== Climate ==
Yeppoon experiences a humid subtropical climate (Köppen: Cfa/Cwa), with hot, wet summers and very mild, relatively dry winters. Average annual rainfall is 977.0 millimetres (38.46 in), with a late summer maximum. Extreme temperatures have ranged from −0.1 °C (31.8 °F) on 25 July 1995 to 42.2 °C (108.0 °F) on 28 November 2018.

Climate data for Yeppoon (23º08'24"S, 150º45'00"E, 6 m AMSL) (1993-2024 normals and extremes)
Month	Jan	Feb	Mar	Apr	May	Jun	Jul	Aug	Sep	Oct	Nov	Dec	Year
Record high °C (°F)	38.6 (101.5)	38.4 (101.1)	39.1 (102.4)	35.0 (95.0)	33.0 (91.4)	29.2 (84.6)	29.4 (84.9)	31.5 (88.7)	34.4 (93.9)	36.6 (97.9)	42.2 (108.0)	40.5 (104.9)	42.2 (108.0)
Mean daily maximum °C (°F)	29.4 (84.9)	29.4 (84.9)	28.6 (83.5)	26.7 (80.1)	24.2 (75.6)	22.0 (71.6)	21.5 (70.7)	22.3 (72.1)	24.4 (75.9)	26.2 (79.2)	27.6 (81.7)	28.8 (83.8)	25.9 (78.7)
Mean daily minimum °C (°F)	24.0 (75.2)	23.8 (74.8)	22.8 (73.0)	19.9 (67.8)	16.0 (60.8)	13.6 (56.5)	12.2 (54.0)	12.8 (55.0)	15.9 (60.6)	19.3 (66.7)	21.5 (70.7)	23.0 (73.4)	18.7 (65.7)
Record low °C (°F)	16.9 (62.4)	16.8 (62.2)	14.5 (58.1)	10.2 (50.4)	4.9 (40.8)	2.7 (36.9)	−0.1 (31.8)	2.7 (36.9)	5.3 (41.5)	8.8 (47.8)	12.0 (53.6)	16.0 (60.8)	−0.1 (31.8)
Average precipitation mm (inches)	117.4 (4.62)	166.8 (6.57)	150.8 (5.94)	74.2 (2.92)	72.9 (2.87)	52.3 (2.06)	47.7 (1.88)	31.3 (1.23)	33.0 (1.30)	54.3 (2.14)	72.9 (2.87)	112.7 (4.44)	977.0 (38.46)
Average precipitation days (≥ 1.0 mm)	9.5	9.7	9.9	7.5	6.1	5.7	3.8	3.5	3.4	4.4	4.9	7.3	75.7
Average afternoon relative humidity (%)	71	71	68	67	64	65	62	66	69	68	69	71	68
Average dew point °C (°F)	22.5 (72.5)	22.4 (72.3)	20.9 (69.6)	18.8 (65.8)	15.7 (60.3)	13.6 (56.5)	12.3 (54.1)	13.7 (56.7)	16.7 (62.1)	18.1 (64.6)	19.5 (67.1)	21.4 (70.5)	18.0 (64.3)
Source: Bureau of Meteorology (1993–2024 normals and extremes)

== Gallery ==
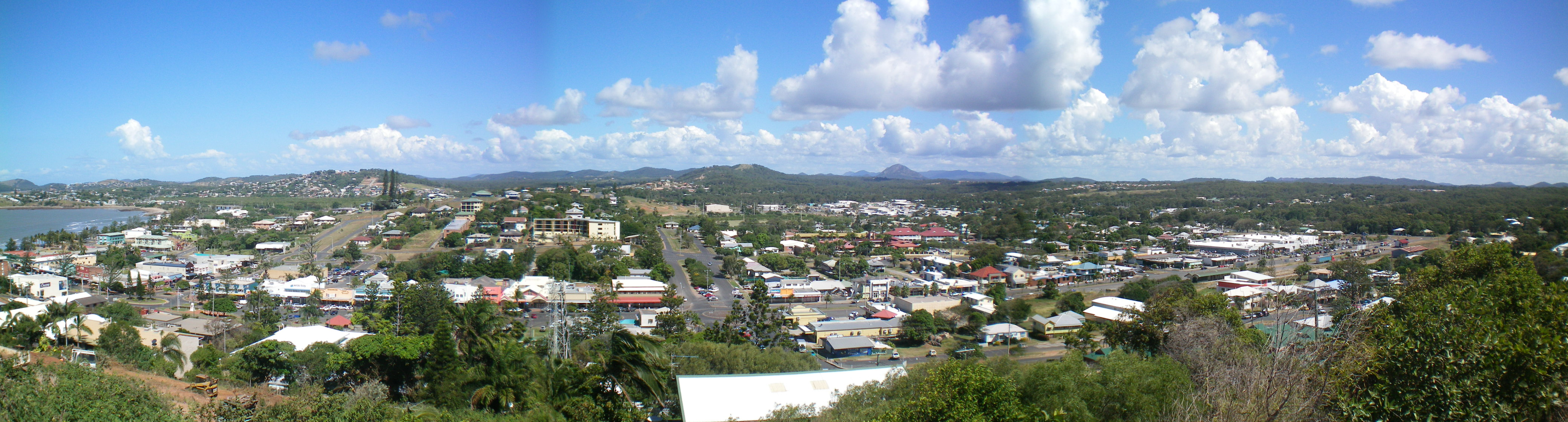
Panorama over the CBD

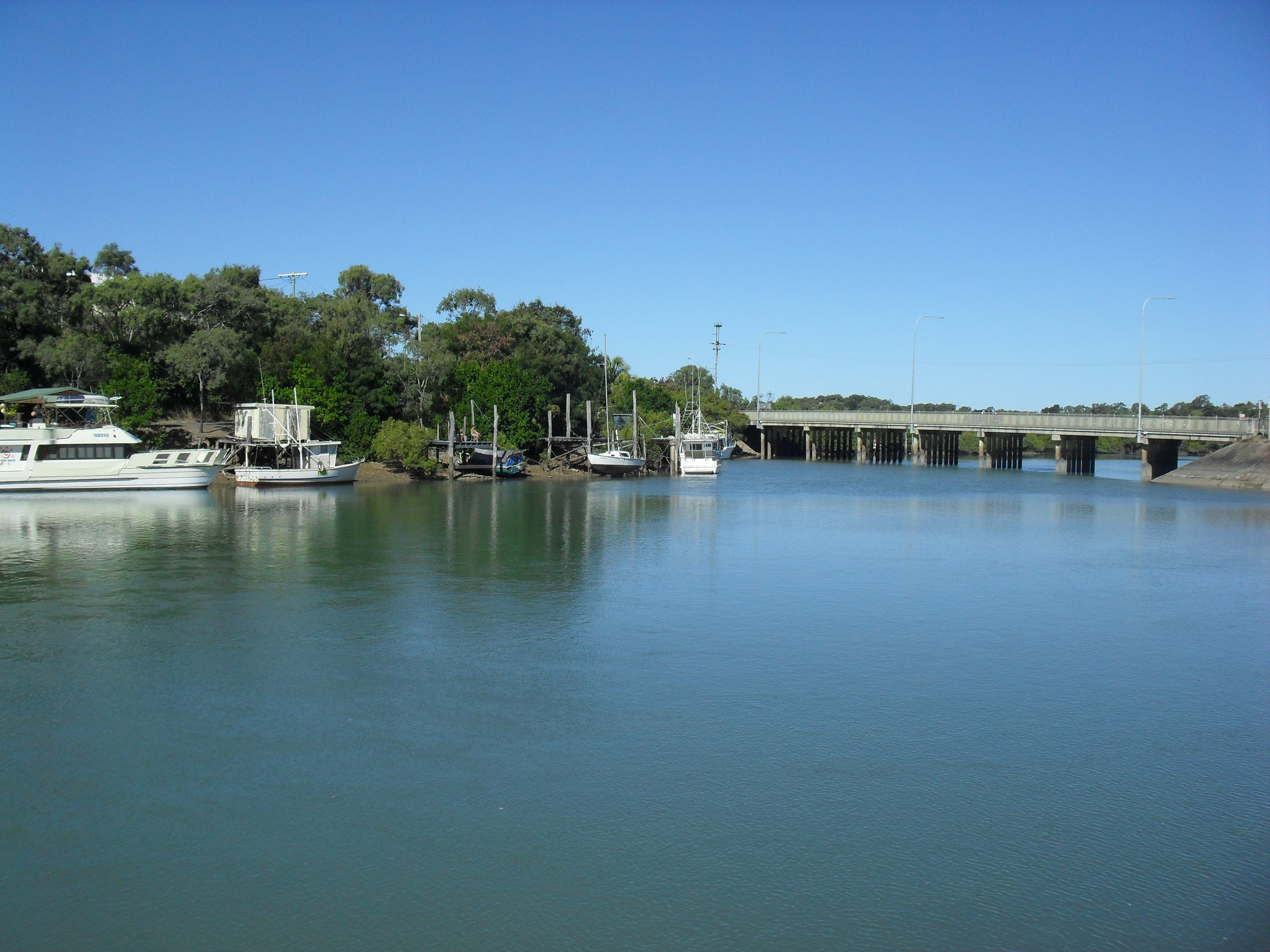
Beak Bridge over Ross Creek

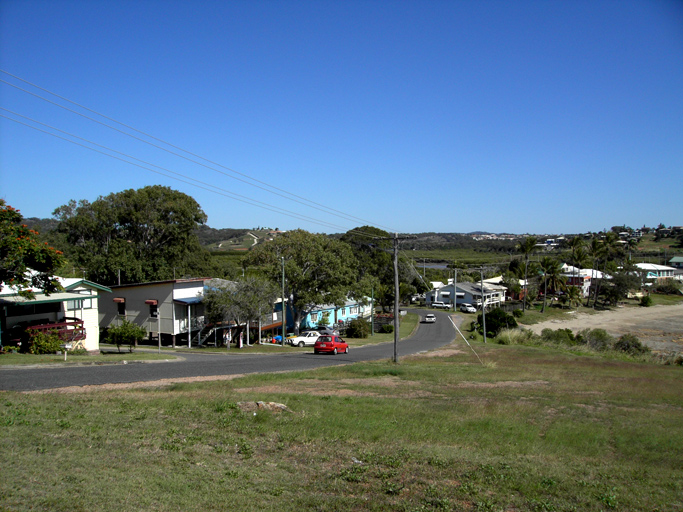
Cooee Bay

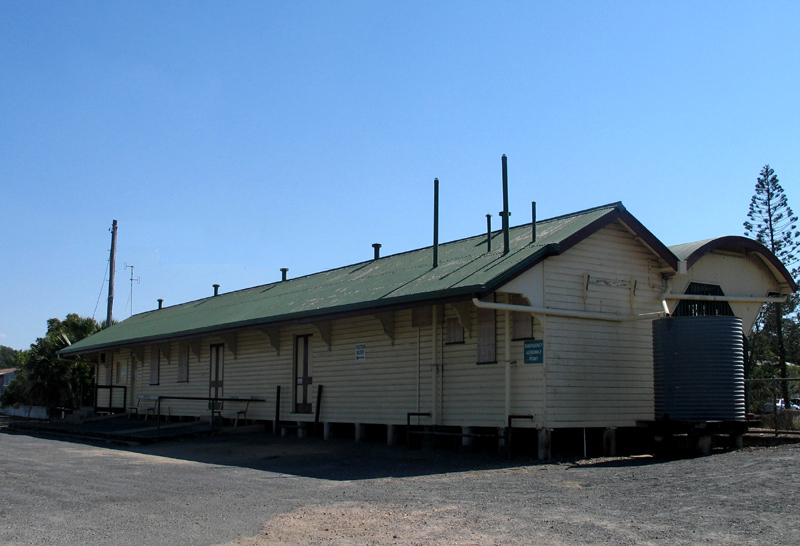
Yeppoon Railway Station (defunct) 2011

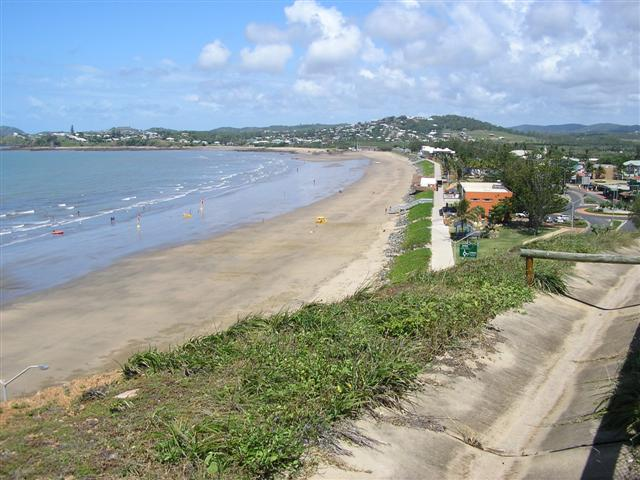
Yeppoon Main Beach

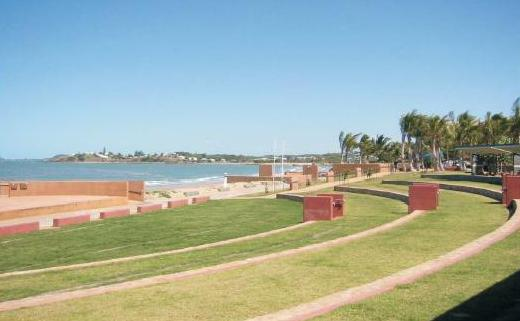
Yeppoon Main Beach amphitheatre

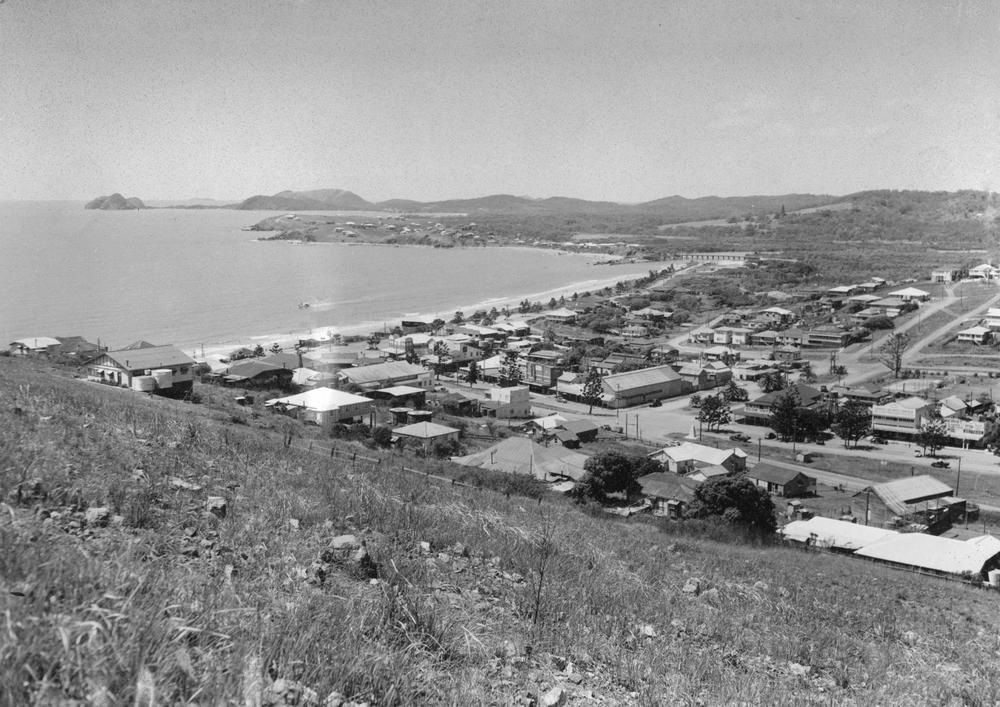
Yeppoon town, 1953

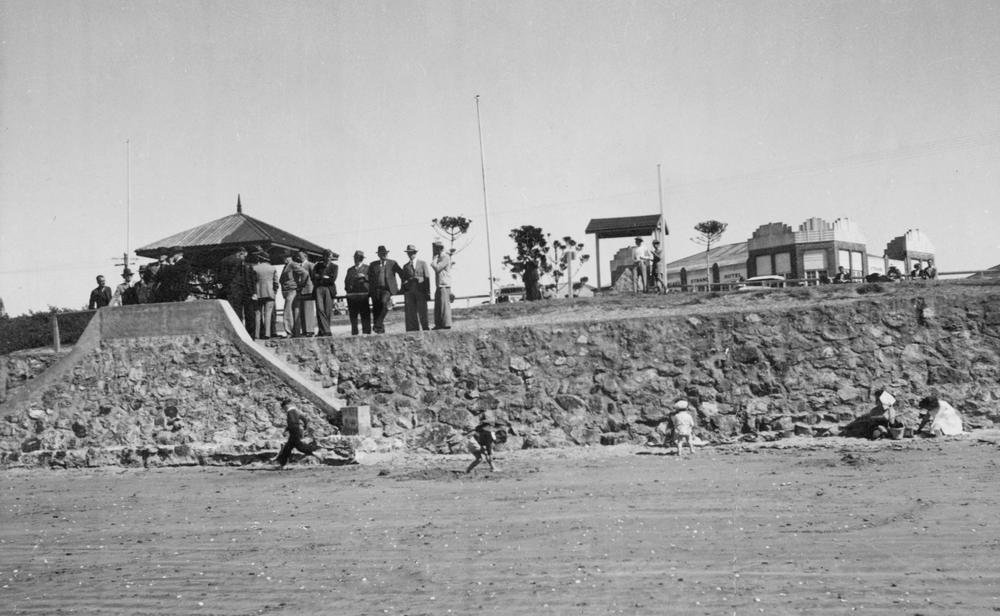
Yeppoon Main Beach, 1948

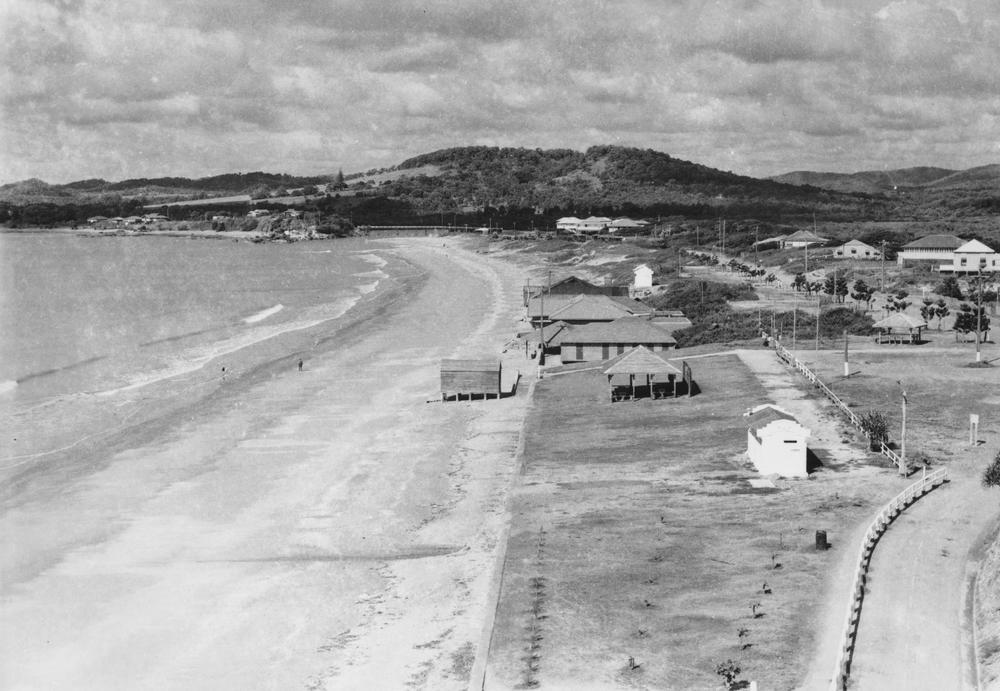
Yeppoon Main Beach, 1936

== See also ==
- Cooee Bay
- Taranganba
- Ross Creek
- Lammermoor
- Emu Park
