= Yeppoon State School =

- Location within Queensland
- 23.1259°S 150.7371°E
- Location: 14–16 Tucker Street, Yeppoon, Shire of Livingstone, Queensland, Australia

History
- Design period: 1940s–1960s (Post-WWII)
- Built: 1929–1957, Sectional School Building (1929) [D/T1], extended with Highset Timber School Building with semi–enclosed stair (1950, 1957–1959, 1957–1959, 1957–1959, 1957–1970, Landscape features: open space around significant buildings, concrete retaining walls (including stairs and garden beds), 1957, 1958, 1958, 1958, 1959

Site notes
- Architect: Department of Public Works (Queensland)

Queensland Heritage Register
- Official name: Yeppoon State School
- Type: state heritage
- Designated: 21 August 2019
- Reference no.: 650231
- Type: Education, Research, Scientific Facility: School – state (primary); Education, research, scientific facility: School-state
- Theme: Educating Queenslanders: Providing primary schooling

Yeppoon State School is a heritage-listed state school and state school at 14–16 Tucker Street, Yeppoon, Shire of Livingstone, Queensland, Australia. It was designed by Department of Public Works (Queensland) and built from 1929 to 1957. It was added to the Queensland Heritage Register on 21 August 2019.

== History ==
Yeppoon State School, established in 1885 as a provisional school, is located in the coastal town of Yeppoon, approximately 36 kilometres (22 mi) northeast of Rockhampton. Located on its current site from 1957, the school retains seven timber buildings arranged in a layout typical of 1950s site planning. The buildings are:

- Block E, a highset timber school building with semi-enclosed stair (built 1957)
- former administration wing (built 1957)
- Blocks A, B and F, three highset timber school buildings with open web steel floor trusses (built 1958, 1958, 1959 respectively)
- Block C, a lowset variation of a highset timber school building with timber floor trusses (built 1959)
- Block D, a sectional building extended with a highset timber school building with semi-enclosed stair extensions (built 1929, extended 1950, 1953, 1957)

which are connected by covered walkways and set in landscaped grounds with retaining walls, stairs and garden beds, and play and sporting areas. The school has a strong and ongoing association with the past and present school community.

Part of the traditional lands of the Darumbal people, a town reserve at Yeppoon (originally called Bald Hills) was proclaimed on 30 April 1868, in response to a petition by Rockhampton residents to the Queensland Surveyor-General for a coastal recreation town. Yeppoon was surveyed in 1872, and the first land sale held on 4 April 1873, but sales were slow as nearby Emu Park proved to be a more popular seaside resort. Nevertheless, pastoralists and selectors settled and developed the fertile and well-watered land around the township of Yeppoon. By 1878, the immediate Yeppoon hinterland had been largely developed for agriculture, with the surrounding area used for grazing.

In 1884, the Yeppoon Sugar Company commenced operations, with a large mill at Farnborough and 2000 acres (809.37ha) of land worked by South Sea Islanders. This industry boosted the town's development. Sawmills were established, and fishing and oystering commenced. The township's growth led to the opening of a provisional school at Yeppoon on 4 May 1885, with 15 pupils.

The establishment of schools was considered an essential step in the development of new communities and integral to their success. Locals often donated land and labour for a school's construction and the school community contributed to maintenance and development. Schools became a community focus, a symbol of progress, and a source of pride, with enduring connections formed with past pupils, parents, and teachers.

By January 1889, further population growth at Yeppoon had increased school enrolments to 60 children. Having surpassed the enrolment number required for establishment of a state school, Yeppoon State School was established. A new state school building replaced the provisional school building, on the same 1.75 acres (0.71 ha) at the eastern end of Queen Street, close to the town's centre.

Yeppoon and its district continued to develop in the decades leading up to World War II. As the result of lobbying, the government opened the Yeppoon railway line from Sleipner Junction railway station to Yeppoon railway station on 22 January 1910. This line connected the town to the Central Western railway line, which linked Rockhampton and Longreach, boosting Yeppoon's importance as a Central Queensland coastal resort. Its settled populated also rose, reaching over 600 by 1911. In August 1922, a hospital opened in Yeppoon and three boarding schools commenced in town between 1917 and 1940, serving the educational needs of Central Queensland. Yeppoon's population reached about 900 by 1933. In 1939, the Scenic Highway between Emu Park and Yeppoon opened, stimulating further growth.

Due to this development, student numbers at Yeppoon State School continued to increase, requiring further accommodation. In 1919, a second classroom building was added to the school site and in 1929 a two-classroom sectional school building was also erected. This highset timber school building, designed to enable the building to be extended in sections by detaching the western end wall, was a common standard plan building form constructed by the Department of Public Works (DPW) in this period.

In the immediate post-World War II period, the Yeppoon State School population increased from 348 in 1945 to 635 in 1955, seriously overcrowding both the school's Queen Street site and its classrooms. This reflected the enormous demand for state education between the late 1940s and the 1960s, which resulted from immigration and the unprecedented national population growth now termed the "baby boom". Queensland's Department of Public Instruction was largely unprepared for this demand. To cope, many new buildings were constructed and existing buildings were extended. For Yeppoon State School, the Department of Public Instruction responded by acquiring a 42-acre (17 ha) site in 1950, for future development. This was located on Tucker Street, about 1 kilometre (0.62 mi) northwest of the Queen Street site. Rather than immediately occupying the site, the Department extended the 1929 sectional school building by two classrooms in 1950 and by one classroom in 1953 of a highset timber school building with semi-enclosed stair building type.

Overcrowded conditions at the school continued and plans were approved in April and June 1956 for the new Yeppoon State School. In 1956, construction of two buildings (known as Blocks D and E) on the Tucker Street site commenced, with an estimated cost of £26,014, rising to £29,038 in the following year. These buildings were joined at their east ends by covered walkways and a timber administration wing comprising two staff rooms. Blocks D and E splayed out from the administration wing to form a wedge-shaped, open-ended courtyard, which was filled, graded and finished with bitumen to form a parade area.

Block D, the 1929 sectional school building (extended in the 1950s) was relocated from the Queen Street school site and erected on concrete piers on the Tucker Street site. A northeast verandah was used for circulation and a room was added to its east end for a library. The understorey featured bracing walls, built-in seating, and a western toilet enclosure.

Block E, a highset timber school building with semi-enclosed stair (the same type as the 1950s extensions to Block D), conformed to the new standard plans for school buildings introduced from 1950. This building type comprised a highset timber-framed structure with the understorey used as covered play space. It was a long and narrow building with a gable roof. A semi-enclosed stair connected the understorey to a north-facing verandah running the length of the building. Classrooms opened off the verandah and had extensive areas of windows; almost the entirety of the verandah wall and the opposite classroom wall were glazed, allowing abundant natural light and ventilation. This type was the most commonly constructed in the 1950s in Queensland. Block E comprised five classrooms with a store, a head teachers room at its east end, and a north-facing verandah. It was set on concrete piers, with the west end of the understorey enclosed for toilets, and the east end enclosed for a store and medical room.

Yeppoon State School opened on its new site in 1957, when grades 4–8 moved to the campus at the beginning of the school year. Grade 3 transferred during the year. The infant school (grades 1–2) remained at the Queen Street site.

The population of the new primary school continued to increase and more buildings were constructed. Blocks A and B, built in 1958, to the north and northeast of Block D, were a refinement of the standard highset timber school building type. Introduced in 1957, this type used an open-web steel joist that spanned further and removed more understorey stumps. This structural system was employed with reinforced concrete piers to support large loads at minimal costs. Block A had a northwest-facing verandah, and two classrooms with a western store room. Block B had a northeast-facing verandah and had three classrooms with a store room on the west side of the easternmost classroom. These buildings were connected to each other by a covered walkway, which ran roughly east-west and featured a glazed screen. This walkway connection linked to Block D via another covered walkway, which ran roughly north-south.

In 1958, a new secondary department ('High Top') opened at the Yeppoon State School, with Year 9 students. Additions for secondary classes were built in 1959 for an estimated cost of £6,101. In keeping with the Queensland Government's continued focus on vocational education during the 1950s and 1960s, a building that was a lowset variation of the highset timber school building with timber floor trusses standard type, used for domestic science (Block C), was erected in 1959 and featured clerestory lighting over its verandah wall and two classrooms with a small staff room and a fitting room. Block C was located east of Block D and connected to it by verandahs and a covered walkway on the north elevation. This building was a lowset version of the F/T5 building type, without a truss. At the same time, a timber school building with open web steel floor trusses (Block F) was erected to the south of Block E. This comprised two classrooms, with its northern verandah connected to the eastern end of Block E via a covered walkway. On 4 September 1962, the Yeppoon Secondary Department was officially opened by Vince Jones, Member of the Queensland Legislative Assembly for Callide.

The siting of the buildings on the new Yeppoon State School campus reflected master planning concepts developed by DPW architects in the 1950s. During a period of high demand for more classroom accommodation, DPW architects introduced school master planning, a concept to plan for controlled growth and change. During the period emphasis shifted away from grid-like layouts to nuclear layouts, centred on a nucleus of core facilities. The plans balanced the need for correct solar orientation and an appropriate response to contours and existing vegetation. Generous courtyard spaces between classroom wings were used for assembly and play areas. Yeppoon State School features open-ended courtyard spaces between Blocks E and D (parade ground), Blocks D and B, and Blocks C and A, and south of Block C.

There was also a focus on more appropriate siting of new schools within their neighbourhoods and ideal solar orientation. Educationalists argued that the ideal orientation of classroom buildings was ten degrees east of north, with verandahs protecting the northern side and classrooms facing south. This led to the construction of school buildings that were oriented in relation to the sun rather than the site boundaries.

The Yeppoon State School site slopes from north to south, necessitating cutting into the hillside to create building sites for the school buildings. Retaining walls dating from the 1950s, to the north of Blocks A and B, to the north of Blocks C and D, and to the north of Block E, were required and form part of the school's landscaping.

An important component of Queensland state schools was their grounds. The early and continuing commitment to play-based education, particularly in primary school, resulted in the provision of outdoor play space and sporting facilities, such as ovals and tennis courts. Yeppoon State School completed its two tennis courts and a basketball court by 1961, playing field with cricket pitch in 1963, and its swimming pool in 1968. In 1987, a second playing field was developed at the Ranger Street end of the school site and named after the school's longest serving principal, William (Doc) Noon.

The Yeppoon Secondary Department moved from the Yeppoon State School site to become a separate campus in Rawlings Street in 1969–70, freeing up classroom space for the primary school.

Alterations to the original buildings at Yeppoon State School have been made since the 1950s. Enclosure of Block F's understorey occurred c. 1962, and this space was converted for use as a tuckshop in 1972. Enclosure of the understorey of Block A for a janitor's room took place c. 1972, and Block C's verandah enclosure occurred c. 1980. In 1971, the first floor of the former administration wing's staff rooms was converted into an administration complex and the ground floor housed a storeroom. By 1998 the first floor was being used as reading resource rooms and by October 2018 the building had been extended.

Additional buildings were erected on the site as the school's population rose. The infant school moved to the southeast corner of the Tucker Street site in new buildings from 1971. Five demountables (Block M) were installed in the late 1970s. A new administration building was constructed in 1978. A preschool campus in Tucker Street commenced construction in February 1979 and was officially opened in July 1979. A special education unit at the school was officially opened in June 1985. Between 1991 and 1992, Block I (classrooms) was constructed. A federally-funded school hall and resource centre (library) was officially opened in 2010 as part of the Building the Education Revolution program.

Enrolments at the school peaked in 1992 with 855 pupils. Since then, pupil numbers have declined, resulting in two of the Block M demountables being removed.

Over Yeppoon State School's long history, it has had strong community involvement. An active Parents and Citizens organisation (P&C) raised funds for school improvements, and anniversaries of the school's commencement have been celebrated. In 1939, the school's 50th anniversary was celebrated with entertainments including a grand jubilee ball. In 1985, its centenary was recognised with a published school history. For Yeppoon State School's 125th anniversary in 2010, a history of the school in photographs was published by the P&C.

The school grounds have been reduced in size since the school's establishment, through alterations to its surrounding roads and subdivision of the site for residential properties. In 2018, the grounds comprised 10.9 hectares (27 acres) featuring an environmental studies area, two sporting fields, a swimming pool and a basketball court.

In 2019, Yeppoon State School continues to operate from its 1957 site and has an enrolment of about 320 pupils. The school retains seven buildings designed by the Department for Public Works and arranged in a manner reflecting 1950s master planning, in landscaped grounds including retaining walls, stairs and garden beds, and play and sporting areas. The school is important to Yeppoon and its district as a key social focus for the community.

== Description ==
Yeppoon State School occupies a 10.9-hectare (27-acre) steeply sloping site on the northwest edge of the coastal town of Yeppoon, approximately 35 kilometres (22 mi) northeast of Rockhampton. The school is primarily accessed from Tucker Street to the east, and is bounded to the south by the Yeppoon railway line (no longer in operation), to the north by Norton and Caroline streets, and to the east, north, and west by residential properties. The school features a complex of teaching and administration buildings, connected by covered walkways and located at the highest part (northeast corner) of the site. Sloping down toward the southern playing field, terraces defined by retaining walls form platforms on which buildings and courtyards stand.

The heritage boundary incorporates the eastern end of the school site, an area of 4.42 hectares (10.9 acres).

=== Site planning ===
The site planning is characteristic of master planned Queensland schools from the 1950s, with long, narrow buildings, linked by covered walkways and surrounded by open-ended, wedge-shaped courtyard play and assembly spaces. The buildings are in a north-facing alignment, arranged in a splayed formation with a central administration wing (now used for classrooms), and linked by a spine of covered walkways around courtyard spaces. The buildings and courtyard spaces follow the slope of the site, with terraces forming levelled building platforms. Of the significant buildings, Blocks A and B are at the highest level, with the terrain stepping down to Blocks C and D and the former administration wing, and then down to Blocks E and F.

=== Block A (1958); Block B (1958); Block F (1959) ===
Blocks A, B and F are highset timber school buildings ith open-web steel floor trusses. These teaching buildings have north-facing first floor verandahs with classrooms on the south sides. Blocks A and B are connected by a central raised walkway and stair, and have stairs at the east and west ends, respectively. Block F is accessed via an eastern stair and a raised walkway links north from the west end of Block F to Block E.

The first floor layouts are intact, retaining open verandahs with bagrack balustrades, and most original partitions, including the door between classrooms.

=== Block C (1958) ===
Block C is a lowset variation of the highset timber school building with semi-enclosed stair. It is a single storey teaching building with a ground level, north-facing verandah providing access to two southern classrooms. The verandah has a separate skillion roof, which allows light to enter the interior spaces from clerestory windows.

=== Block D (1929; extended 1950 and 1953, with 1957 understorey) ===
Block D is a sectional school building extended with a highset timber school building with semi-enclosed stair. The 1920s and 1950s phases of Block D's construction are evident in the building fabric, with the sectional school building segment at the west end of the building and the highset timber school building with semi-enclosed stair extension at the east. The highset teaching building has a north-facing (now partially-enclosed) verandah, and a series of south-facing classrooms. The understorey comprises open play space, original toilets and southern bracing walls.

Most classrooms have had dividing partitions removed to form one long room, and many wall and ceiling linings are not original.

=== Block E (1957) ===
Block E is a long highset timber school building with semi-enclosed stairs. It is a teaching building with a north-facing first floor verandah, accessing southern classrooms. Stairs are at the east and west ends of the verandah, with timber-framed glazed screens semi-enclosing the adjacent verandah spaces.

The first floor layout comprises five classrooms, with a former principal's office projecting from the east end, separated from the classrooms by a walkway leading south to Block F. The verandah has been mostly enclosed, with parts of the verandah wall removed (former window locations) to expand classroom sizes. Bulkheads indicate the original layout.

The understorey retains its original open play space, seating, bracing walls, enclosures for toilets, and former medical room.

=== Former administration wing (1957) ===
The former administration wing stands over a terrace, providing an understorey at its south end. It opens onto a covered walkway along its west side, which connects the understory of Block D with the first floor of Block E. An extension on its east side is identifiable by a change in roof form and wall cladding, and by internal wall nibs and bulkheads.

The first floor contains a classroom (formerly two classrooms) that has had its eastern wall removed to open into the extension. The understorey includes two store rooms.

=== Covered walkways (1957–59) ===
Covered walkways form a central spine connecting Blocks B and D; Blocks D, E and the former administration wing; and Blocks E and F. They have corrugated metalroofs and timber posts that follow footpaths of concrete and timber floor boards.

A highset covered walkway links Blocks A and B and features a timber stair; glazed, timber-framed screen (some panels have louvres); timber floor boards to first floor; and post-and-rail timber balustrades.

The covered walkway between Block D and E that forms part of the former administration wing has: a flat ceiling lined in flat sheets with square cover strips; square timber posts; a post-and-rail timber balustrade; and a timber floor to the highset sections and concrete floor to the lowset sections.

=== Courtyards (1957–59) ===
Open courtyards for play and assembly spaces, located between Blocks A and C; Blocks B and D; Blocks D and E; and south of Blocks C and E, are characteristic of the 1950s planning. They generally have a bitumen surface; and their open nature enables the significant buildings to have a direct visual relationship to, from and between each other.

=== Landscape features ===
The school grounds are well-established, and incorporate open space around the significant buildings, which facilitates natural light and ventilation of the interiors.

Concrete retaining walls (1957–59) provide level platforms for the school buildings and adjacent courtyard spaces. They are located: north of Blocks A and B; between Blocks A and B and Blocks D and C; and between Blocks D and C, and Block E. The walls have concrete spoon drains at their bases, and concrete stairs provide access between levels.

Concrete-edged and walled garden beds (1957–59) are formed between Blocks A and B, and are incorporated in the retaining wall to the north of Block E.

A large playing field (1963), featuring a cricket pitch, is located at the south end of the site and is defined on the north and west sides by a formed earth bank.

The main entrance (by 1970) into the school complex from Tucker Street is defined by a driveway with a bitumen surface.

== Heritage listing ==
Yeppoon State School was listed on the Queensland Heritage Register on 21 August 2019 having satisfied the following criteria.

The place is important in demonstrating the evolution or pattern of Queensland's history.

Yeppoon State School (established as Yeppoon Provisional School in 1885, and relocated to its current site in 1957) is important in demonstrating the evolution of state education and its associated architecture in Queensland. The place retains good, representative examples of standard government designs that were architectural responses to prevailing government educational philosophies; set in landscaped grounds with assembly and play areas, and sporting facilities.

It is also important as a demonstration of the Queensland Government's provision of schools on new, master planned sites in booming population centres across Queensland in the 1950s, a time of pronounced population growth.

The layout of the administration and classroom blocks, the covered links between them and associated open spaces, demonstrate the mid-1950s introduction of organic master planning at state schools, which responded to the existing contours of the site and provided for ordered growth from a nucleus.

The 1950s buildings at Yeppoon State School demonstrate the evolution of Department of Public Works (DPW) designs during this period. These buildings include the: highset timber school buildings with semi-enclosed stair (Block E, 1957; and extensions to Block D, 1950, 1953 and 1957); former administration wing (1957); lowset variation of the highset timber school building with timber floor trusses (Block C, 1959); three highset timber school buildings with open web steel floor trusses (Block A, 1958; Block B, 1958; and Block F, 1959).

The large site with provision of assembly and play areas, and sporting facilities, demonstrates the Queensland Government's recognition of importance of play and aesthetics in the education of children.

The place is important in demonstrating the principal characteristics of a particular class of cultural places.

Yeppoon State School is important in demonstrating the principal characteristics of a Queensland state school of the 1950s. These include its: site planning; range of highset and lowset timber-framed buildings of standard designs that incorporate understorey play areas, verandahs and classrooms with high levels of natural light and ventilation; and a generous, landscaped site with garden beds, retaining walls, stairs, and assembly, play and sports areas.

The site planning is intact and important in demonstrating the principal characteristics of 1950s Queensland state school master planning, which provided for ordered growth from a nucleus. The collection of buildings (Blocks A, B, C, D, E and F, and administration wing (former)) at Yeppoon State School contribute to the concept of long, narrow buildings, arranged in a splayed, north-facing formation with a central administration wing, and a spine of covered walkways linked around open-ended courtyard assembly and play spaces.

The highset timber school buildings with open web steel floor trusses (Blocks A, B and F) are good, intact examples of their type, demonstrating the incorporation of trusses into school designs to enable unimpeded play space under the classrooms. The buildings retain their: highset character with exposed trusses under; timber-framed construction; gable roof; north-facing verandahs for circulation; large banks of south-facing timber-framed awning windows, with centre-pivoting fanlights; and early classroom widths.

The Highset Timber Teaching Building with semi-enclosed stair (Block E) demonstrates the principal characteristics of its type. These include its: highset character with covered play space under; timber-framed construction; gable roof; north-facing verandah for circulation; timber-framed glazed screens semi-enclosing verandah ends; large banks of south-facing timber-framed awning windows, with fanlights; early classroom widths and its understorey bracing walls, concrete posts, toilet partitions, and timber seating.

Block C is an intact example of a highset timber school building with timber floor truss standard type, varied to be lowset. Block C demonstrates the principal characteristics of the type, including its: timber-framed construction; gable roof; north-facing verandah for circulation; large banks of south-facing timber-framed awning windows; north-facing clerestory windows; and early classroom widths.

The place has a strong or special association with a particular community or cultural group for social, cultural or spiritual reasons.

Yeppoon State School has a strong and ongoing association with past and present pupils, parents, staff members, and the surrounding community through sustained use since its establishment in 1885. With over 130 years of association with the Yeppoon community, and over 60 years of operation from its current site, the establishment of the school reflected the post-war population boom of the area, which resulted in a strong community demand for state-run education. The place is important for its contribution to the educational development of Yeppoon, with generations of children taught at the school, and has served as a prominent venue for social interaction and community focus. The strength of association is demonstrated through repeated local volunteer action, donations, and an active Parents and Citizens Association.
