= 1949 Central Queensland cyclone =

Tropical cyclone in Australia

The 1949 Central Queensland cyclone was an unnamed tropical cyclone that struck the Central Queensland coast in Australia on 2 March 1949.

The cyclone impacted the cities of Gladstone and Rockhampton and their surrounding towns and localities. There were a number of fatalities, and extensive damage was sustained to many homes and businesses and much of the local infrastructure, including the telecommunications, electricity and transport networks.

The Bureau of Meteorology lists the 1949 Central Queensland cyclone as one of the 15 major cyclones to strike the east coast of Queensland between 1890 and 2006.

== Formation ==
On 28 February 1949, reports emerged that a tropical cyclone had developed and was 100 miles east-south-east of Willis Island, moving in a south-south-westerly direction. On 1 March 1949, it was reported the cyclone had been maintaining a parabolic south-westerly to southerly track, and was 80 miles east of Cape Capricorn. By 2 March 1949, the cyclone had travelled further south to between Bundaberg and Gladstone, where the system deepened and crossed the coast just south of Gladstone.

The cyclone then almost immediately swung north, and travelled back up the coast to Rockhampton before eventually moving west through Capricornia dumping heavy amounts of rain throughout inland areas and ultimately weakening near Tambo.

The 1949 Central Queensland cyclone was the third to cross the coast in the space of three weeks. It followed the unnamed 1949 Far North Queensland cyclone which caused widespread damage to Cooktown on 10 February 1949. A weaker cyclone then crossed the coast north of Mackay on 16 February 1949, bringing heavy rain to the city but no significant damage.

== Impact ==
=== Gladstone ===
Gladstone was extensively damaged when the cyclone hit.

Winds were estimated to have gusted up to 120 miles per hour as the cyclone passed over Gladstone, with the peak estimated to have occurred at around 1 p.m.

Sixty homes in Gladstone were unroofed, and dozens of other buildings were damaged. The Roman Catholic Church's convent school and the Presbyterian Church were destroyed, while the Queen's Hotel and the Church of England were unroofed and the Gladstone meatworks badly damaged. School children were taken out of the convent school building two hours before it was demolished.

When the police station was unroofed, a local police sergeant was forced to move his family into the local watchhouse until that too was badly damaged, forcing the family to seek shelter in the court house.

Many marine vessels were destroyed or badly damaged including a local tourist boat Norwest which was washed up onto the banks of Auckland Creek.

Gladstone's communication and electricity network was badly damaged in the cyclone.

There was substantial crop losses in the surrounding area including pawpaw crops in the Yarwun-Targinnie district and peanut crops in the Mount Larcom district.

Due to the cyclone, a passenger train carrying 350 passengers was held at Raglan, between Gladstone and Rockhampton, for 26 hours. During the stopover, groups of passengers had to regularly walk to the local store and hotel to for food supplies. As floodwaters in Raglan Creek rose nearby, the passengers and crew assisted the hotelkeeper at Raglan to move furniture to higher ground.

During the extensive clean up, the Gladstone mayor criticised the condition of 30 tons of roofing iron which had been sent to Gladstone for cyclone repairs, describing the iron as "rusted and useless" as it had been exposed to the elements on inadequately-covered railway wagons.

=== Rockhampton ===
The city of Rockhampton and adjacent coastal areas were extensively damaged when the cyclone made an unexpected northern turn back up the coast, once it had crossed near Gladstone.

The estimated peak of the cyclone in Rockhampton was estimated to have been at 7 p.m. when winds of up to 100 miles per hour were recorded, and the barometric pressure reached 28.56 inches of mercury (967 hectopascals) - the lowest to ever have been recorded in Rockhampton.

Many homes, businesses and landmarks in Rockhampton suffered substantial damage.

Extensive damage was reported at the Rockhampton railway station where approximately 100 sheet of iron was dislodged above the railway platforms. After being severed during the cyclone, the rail link between Rockhampton and Yeppoon was closed until repairs could be made to the damaged tracks. Other parts of the local railway network to have been damaged during the cyclone included the line to Ridgelands, the line from Baralaba to Theodore, and the line from Rannes to Thangool.

There was an estimated £20,000 done to the Wintergarden Theatre while the picture theatre at Koongal was also extensively damaged.

The Rockhampton Botanic Gardens sustained damage.

Damage to the electricity network was extensive with flying iron and trees cutting down main power lines. Power supply began being progressively restored the day following the cyclone, with priority given to hospitals, water treatment plants and other essential services. With widespread power outages, volunteers were called for to manually operate an iron lung for a 16-year-old patient at Rockhampton General Hospital until power was restored. The lack of auxiliary power at the hospital and the necessity of requiring volunteers to manually operate the machine prompted a public debate in the local press.

Communities along the Capricorn Coast, including Yeppoon and Emu Park, also sustained extensive damage during the cyclone. Dead cattle began washing up on the beaches along Zilzie and Emu Park after the cyclone. Mass burials of the beasts took place at the end of each beach.

Damage was also sustained at Port Alma and the Rockhampton Harbour.

The mining town of Mount Morgan, south-west of Rockhampton, experienced strong winds and heavy rain, but the damage to the town was minimal compared to Rockhampton although some roofs were blown off buildings and some verandas were damaged, including at the Avoca Hotel and Allen's Hotel at Tipperary Point.

Many crops in the area were lost, including a substantial citrus crop from Byfield.

Kalapa also felt the effects of the cyclone as it moved inland. Further west, strong winds and heavy rain were recorded at Emerald and throughout the Central Highlands but no substantial damage was reported.

The publication of Rockhampton's daily newspaper was abandoned during the cyclone, and therefore there was no edition of The Morning Bulletin issued on 3 March 1949. The Rockhampton Newspaper Co Pty Ltd issued an apology in the following day's edition, explaining that the decision not to publish had been owing to "unsurmountable difficulties".

Local radio station 4RK remained on air during the cyclone but staff were forced to cover transmitting equipment with tents and had to tear up linoleum from the floor so it could be used to cover the generator when water began pouring through the roof.

Despite the widespread damage and the substantial clean up that occurred following the cyclone, several scheduled events went ahead as planned in the weeks following, including the visit to Rockhampton by Lord Rowallan, the Chief Scout of the Boy Scout Association, who attended several official events in the city, including a civic reception at City Hall and a Rotary Club luncheon.

The Communist Party of Australia also attempted to proceed with a scheduled open-air meeting in the city centre on 28 March 1949, which led to the infamous 1949 Rockhampton riot when around 1500 protestors gate-crashed the meeting and showered supporters with various projectiles including rotten eggs, rotten fruit, flour bombs and stink bombs before breaking through police cordons and assaulting party supporters.

=== Bundaberg/Maryborough ===
The cyclone's wind was not felt further south in centres such as Bundaberg and Maryborough, although some trees were uprooted, and some homes damaged, including one in East Bundaberg where a young boy was killed when a tree fell on a family home. Several vessels damaged at Hervey Bay due to rough seas. Damage was also reported at Burnett Heads. Flooding occurred in these areas brought about by the heavy rain associated with the cyclone.

== Casualties ==
=== Fatalities during cyclone ===
- John Fontaine - a 45-year-old man killed when he was blown from the roof of a Rockhampton property
- Charles William Inslay James - a 56-year-old man killed when hit by a falling tree branch in Rockhampton
- Alfred Edward Ramett - a four-year-old boy killed when a tree fell through his home in Bundaberg
- Jacob Worthington - a 68-year-old man killed when he was blown from the roof of a Gladstone property

=== Fatalities after cyclone ===
- George Coulson - a man killed when he likely fell from his horse and drowned while attempting to cross a creek near Jambin.
- Dennis James Hannifen - a 29-year-old man who was killed when he fell from his horse and drowned while attempting to cross Little Gin Creek near Longreach.
- Frank Hobson - a 15-year-old boy who drowned at Mount Morgan Company's upper dam while fishing with his brother. The dam along with the Dee River both flooded during the cyclone.
- John Warry - a man killed when he fell from his horse and drowned while attempting to drive cattle across Callide Creek near Goovigen.

=== Injuries ===
Many non-fatal injuries were reported during the cyclone. Many rescues also took place during and following the cyclone. A family of seven was rescued by police after sheltering under their demolished house at Gavial Siding for two days without food.

== Relief Fundraising ==
The Rockhampton Cyclone Relief Fund was established soon after the cyclone, to assist victims in the City of Rockhampton, Livingstone Shire and Fitzroy Shire areas. By 8 June 1949, a total of £3162 had been raised for the fund. A total of 79 applications totalling of £1466/5/10 in assistance had been authorised while another 225 applications from the relief fund were under consideration.

Gladstone also had a similar cyclone relief fund.

A variety show was held at the Palais Royal in Rockhampton on 6 April 1949 as a fundraising event, featuring well known Brisbane comedians Buster Fiddes and Mavis Monk. The show had a disappointing crowd with only 270 people attending the event.

== Legacy ==
Following the cyclone, discussions took place regarding how to improve warnings of an approaching cyclone. The Rockhampton Chamber of Commerce criticised the fact that no person in the city had been tasked with the responsibility of warning people of an incoming cyclone.

There were also calls in the press for homes, businesses and public property in northern and central areas of Queensland to be strengthened to better withstand tropical cyclones that crossed the coast into populated areas.

The 1949 Central Queensland cyclone is still remembered by many residents in Rockhampton and Gladstone. However, until Cyclone Marcia struck Rockhampton in 2015, there had been a growing sense of complacency amongst others who had a misguided belief that the city would never be seriously affected by a cyclone.

The Charlie James Memorial Trophy has been awarded to local Rockhampton tennis players since 1960. It is named after Charles James who was killed during the cyclone.
