= Alan Shinkfield =

Australian writer

- Born: Australia
- Occupations: Preacher, writer

Alan Shinkfield is a writer based in Emu Park, mainly covering the field of Christianity and Christian beliefs.

== Career ==
Alan Shinkfield was born in a middle-class family. Although the family was not practicing, Shinkfield found interest in religion through his primary education and co-curricular activities. Shinkfield spent most of his childhood studying and working on small jobs to cover his expenses. Shinkfield notably became interested in music and played various instruments, eventually learning from a voice production instructor based in Melbourne.

== Books ==
- A Layman's Understanding of Satan's Evil
- What Everyone Should Know but It Is Not Taught in School!
- Beulah
- The Book That No One Should Read!
- Christianity
- A Full Circle!
