= Tanby, Queensland =

Tanby
- Suburb
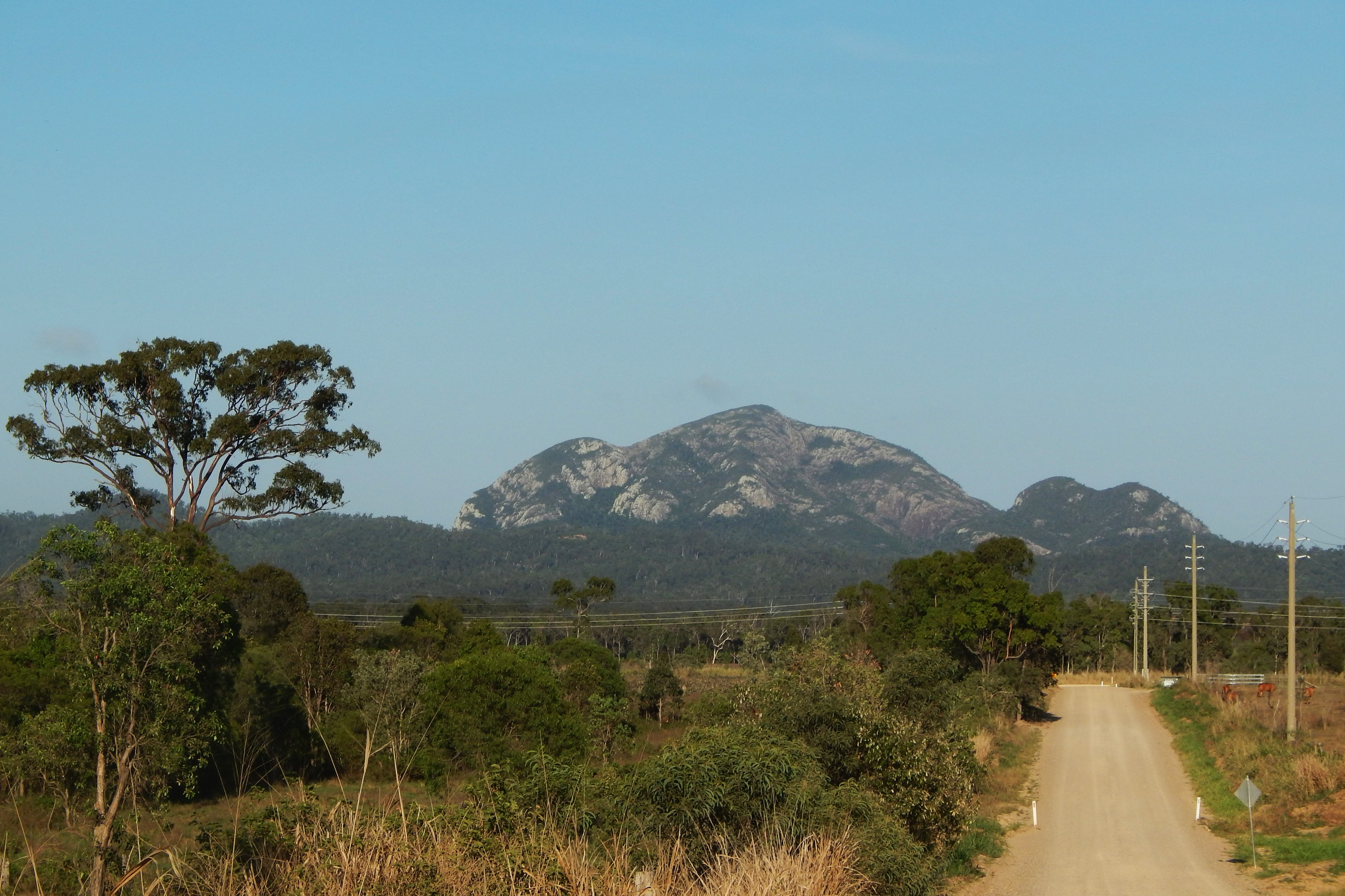
- Landscape along Tanby Post Office Road, 2018

- Interactive map of Tanby
- Coordinates: 23.2227°S 150.7344°E
- Country: Australia
- State: Queensland
- LGA: Livingstone Shire
- Location: 9.0 km (5.6 mi) NW of Emu Park; 11.6 km (7.2 mi) S of Yeppoon; 42.1 km (26.2 mi) NE of Rockhampton; 672 km (418 mi) NNW of Brisbane

Government
  - State electorate: Keppel
  - Federal division: Capricornia

Area
  - Total: 42.6 km^{2} (16.4 sq mi)

Population
  - Total: 577 (2021 census)
  - Density: 13.545/km^{2} (35.08/sq mi)
- Time zone: UTC+10:00 (AEST)
- Postcode: 4703
Suburbs around Tanby
Hidden Valley	Taroomball	Causeway Lake
Bondoola	Tanby	Kinka Beach
Cawarral	Coorooman	Emu Park

Tanby is a rural locality in the Livingstone Shire, Queensland, Australia. In the 2021 census, Tanby had a population of 577 people.

== Geography ==
The Rockhampton–Emu Park Road enters from the south (Coorooman) and exits to the south-east (Emu Park).

== Demographics ==
In the 2016 census, Tanby had a population of 539 people.

In the 2021 census, Tanby had a population of 577 people.

== Education ==
There are no schools in Tanby. The nearest government primary schools are:

- Emu Park State School in neighbouring Emu Park to the south-east
- Taranganba State School in Taranganba to the north
- Yeppoon State School in Yeppoon to the north
- Cawarral State School in neighbouring Cawarral to the south-west

The nearest government secondary school is Yeppoon State High School in Yeppoon.

There are also non-government schools in Yeppoon and its suburbs.

== Amenities ==
There is a Benedictine monastery for nuns at 40 Hannah Road (23.2125°S 150.7434°E). It is home to the Sophia Library which can be visited and from which books can be borrowed.
