= The Keppels, Queensland =

The Keppels
- Suburb
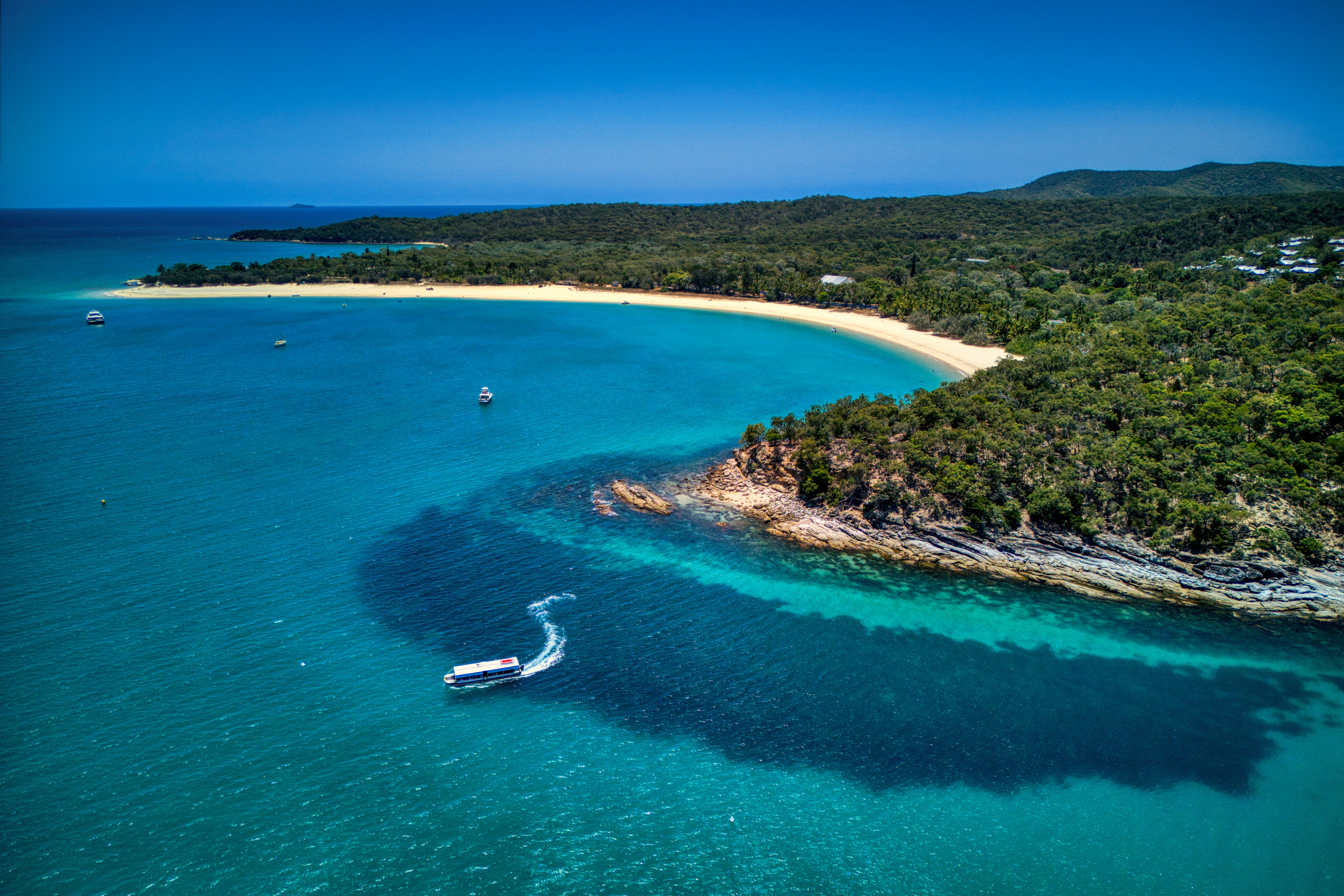
- The Great Keppel Island

- Interactive map of The Keppels
- Coordinates: 23.1977°S 150.9441°E
- Country: Australia
- State: Queensland
- LGA: Livingstone Shire

Government
  - State electorate: Keppel

Area
  - Total: 1,028.7 km^{2} (397.2 sq mi)

Population
  - Total: 60 (2021 census)
  - Density: 0.058/km^{2} (0.151/sq mi)
- Time zone: UTC+10:00 (AEST)
- Postcode: 4700
Suburbs around The Keppels
Farnborough; Bangalee; Yeppoon	Coral Sea	Coral Sea
Cooee Bay; Lammermoor; Rosslyn; Mulambin; Causeway Lake; Kinka Beach	The Keppels	Coral Sea
Emu Park; Zilzie; Keppel Sands; Joskeleigh	Coral Sea	Coral Sea

The Keppels is an off-shore locality for the Keppel Islands, an island group in the Coral Sea within the Livingstone Shire, Queensland, Australia. In the 2021 census, The Keppels had a population of 60.

== Geography ==
The largest islands are Great Keppel Island and North Keppel Island.

== Demographics ==
In the 2016 census, The Keppels had a population of 50 people.

In the 2021 census, The Keppels had a population of 60 people.

== Education ==
North Keppel Island Environmental Education Centre is an Outdoor and Environmental Education Centre at North Keppel Island (23.0764°S 150.8853°E).

There are no mainstream schools on The Keppels. The alternatives are distance education and boarding school.
