= Coorooman, Queensland =

Coorooman
- Suburb
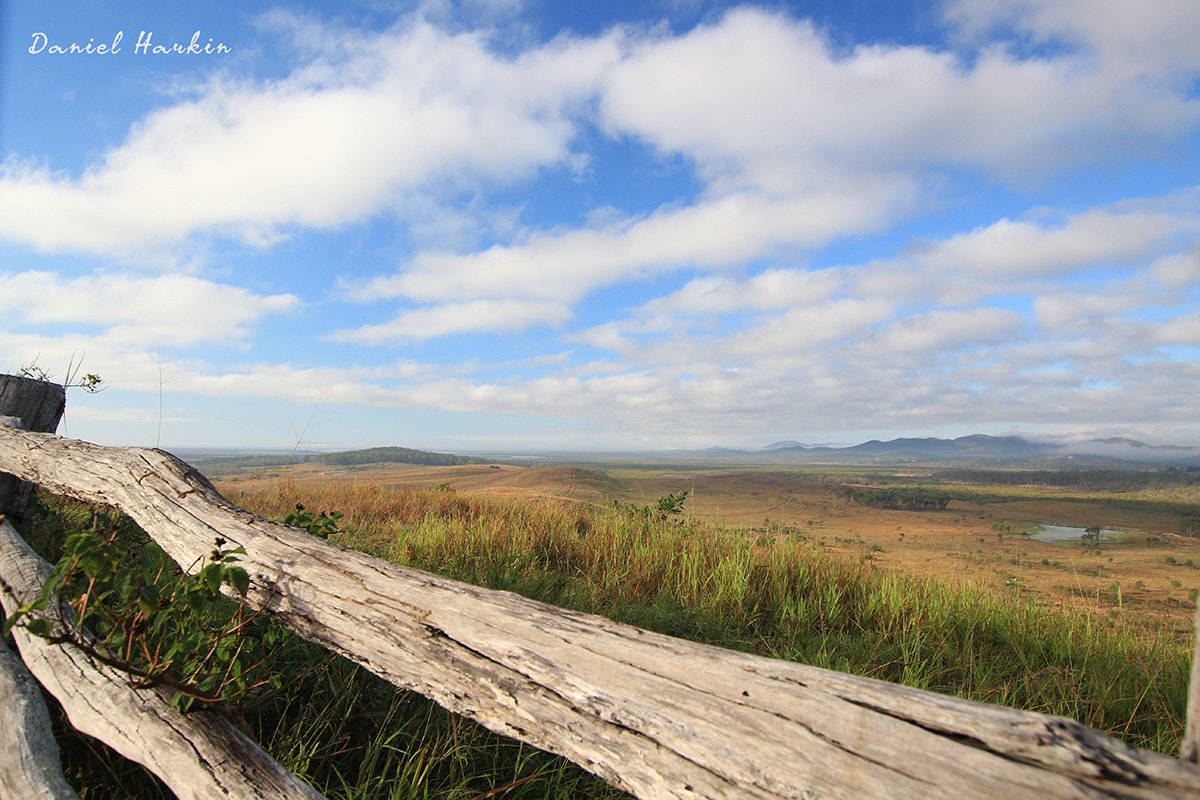
- The Coorooman Valley, 2015

- Interactive map of Coorooman
- Coordinates: 23.2858°S 150.7430°E
- Country: Australia
- State: Queensland
- LGA: Livingstone Shire
- Location: 10.9 km (6.8 mi) W of Emu Park; 16.8 km (10.4 mi) S of Yeppoon; 34.4 km (21.4 mi) NE of Rockhampton; 678 km (421 mi) NNW of Brisbane

Government
  - State electorate: Keppel
  - Federal division: Capricornia

Area
  - Total: 45.3 km^{2} (17.5 sq mi)

Population
  - Total: 97 (2021 census)
  - Density: 2.141/km^{2} (5.55/sq mi)
- Time zone: UTC+10:00 (AEST)
- Postcode: 4702
Suburbs around Coorooman
Tanby	Tanby	Emu Park
Cawarral	Coorooman	Zilzie
Coowonga	Coowonga	Keppel Sands

Coorooman is a rural coastal locality in the Livingstone Shire, Queensland, Australia. In the 2021 census, Coorooman had a population of 97 people.

== Geography ==
The many branches of Cawarral Creek permeate the locality, forming much of the southern boundary, part of the eastern, and draining the interior. Most of the area around the creek network is marshland with most land use occurring in the north and west, a mixture of rural residential housing and grazing on native vegetation.

Although a coastal locality, the only boundary with the Coral Sea is the mouth of Cawarral Creek, as the land on either side of the creek mouth is in the localities of Zilzie (north of the creek mouth) and Keppel Sands (south of the creek mouth).

The Rockhampton–Emu Park Road enters the locality from the south-west (Coowonga) and exits to the north (Tanby).

== History ==
The locality was named after its former railway station on the Emu Park branch line, which in turn took its name from the creek, which is believed to be an Aboriginal word coorawan meaning kangaroo.

== Demographics ==
In the 2016 census, Coorooman had a population of 87 people.

In the 2021 census, Coorooman had a population of 97 people.

== Education ==
There are no schools in Coorooman. The nearest government primary schools are Cawarral State School in neighbouring Cawarral to the west and Coowonga State School in neighbouring Coowonga to the south. The nearest government secondary school is Yeppoon State High School in Yeppoon to the north.

== Amenities ==
The mouth of the Coorooman Creek is good for fishing. Care must be taken around the creek as crocodiles have been spotted in the area. For boat access to the creek, there is a boat ramp and floating walkway on its north bank in Svendsen Road in Zilzie (23.2994°S 150.7692°E). It is managed by the Livingstone Shire Council.
