= Bell Park, Emu Park =

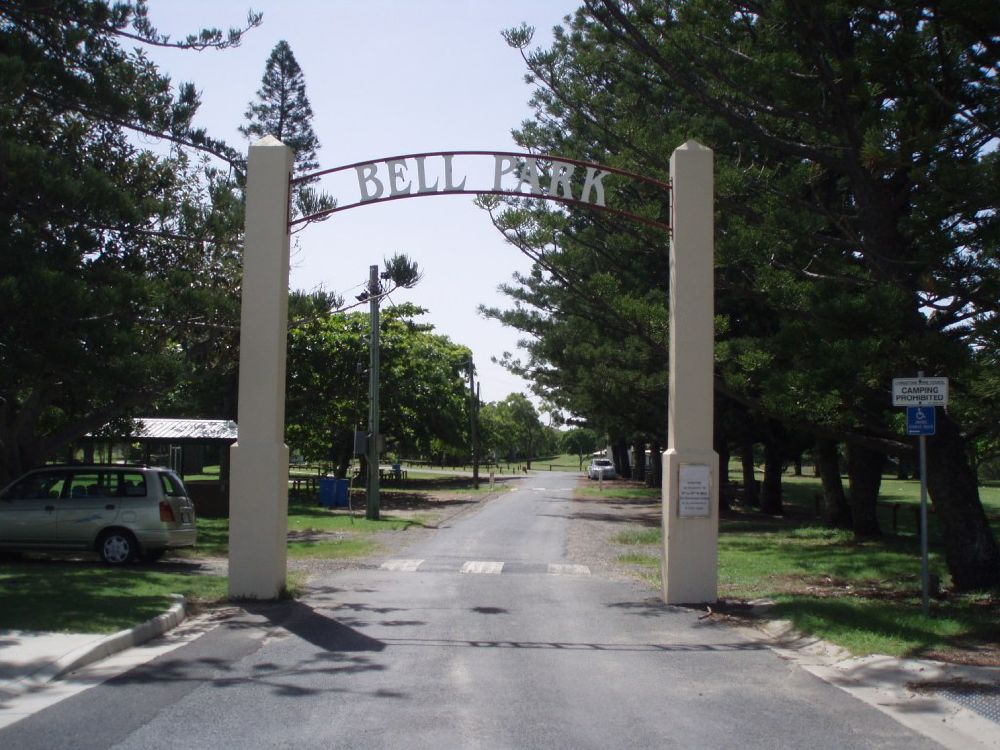
- Gateway to Bell Park

- Location within Queensland Location within Australia
- 23.2559°S 150.8273°E
- Location: Hill Street, Emu Park, Shire of Livingstone, Queensland, Australia

History
- Design period: 1870s–1890s (late 19th century)
- Built: 1910s–1940s

Queensland Heritage Register
- Official name: Bell Park, Botanic Gardens Reserve
- Type: state heritage (landscape, built)
- Designated: 29 April 2003
- Reference no.: 602326
- Significant period: 1910s–1940s (fabric); 1892, 1899, 1908, 1950 (historical); 1890s–ongoing (social)
- Significant components: running track, stalls – market, trees/plantings, bridge – foot/pedestrian, pathway/walkway, box/es, rotunda

Bell Park is a heritage-listed park at Hill Street, Emu Park, Shire of Livingstone, Queensland, Australia. It was built from 1910s to 1940s. It is also known as Botanic Gardens Reserve. It was added to the Queensland Heritage Register on 29 April 2003.

== History ==
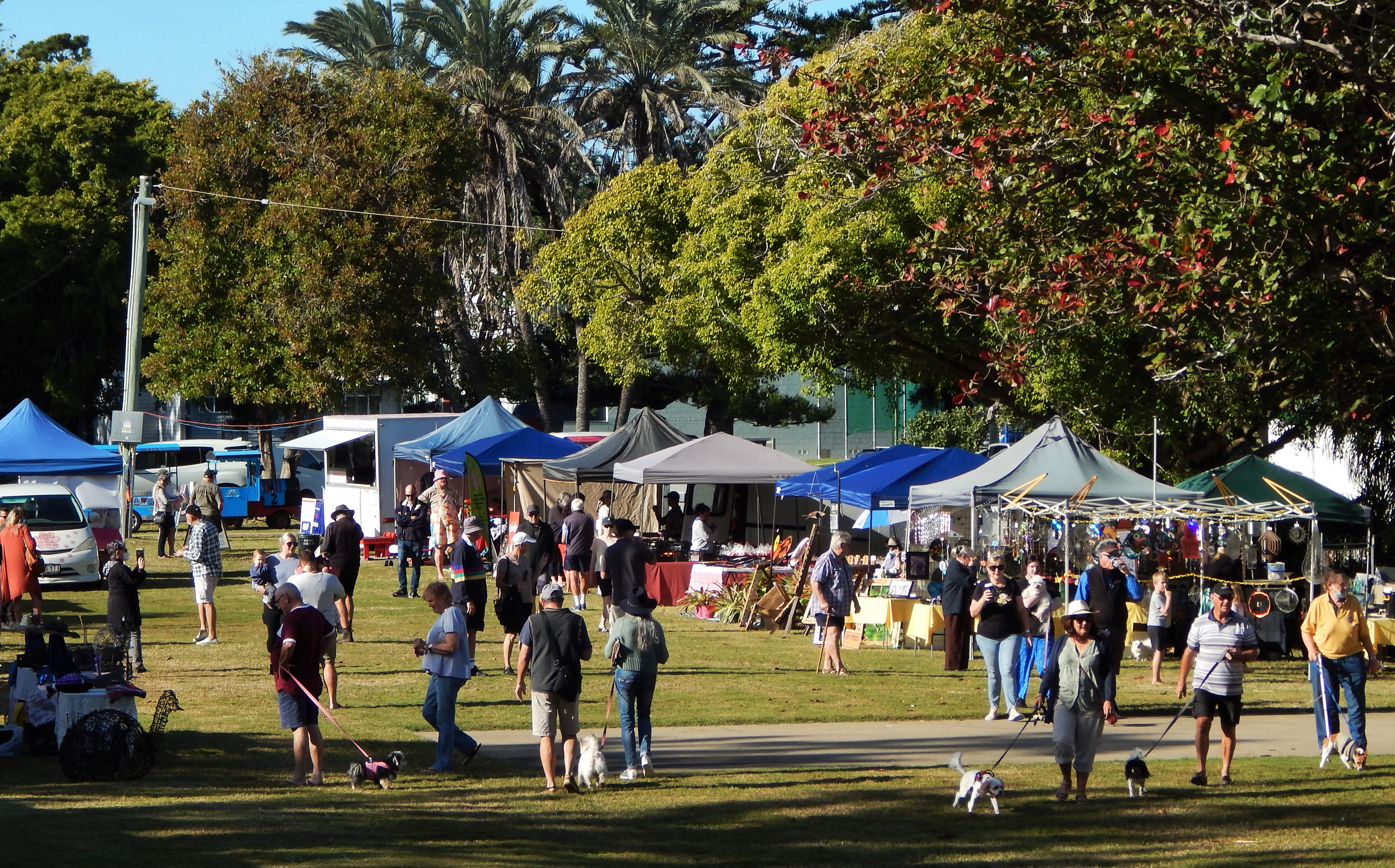
Market day at Bell Park, 2022

Bell Park was gazetted in 1899 as a Reserve for Botanic Gardens and Public Reserve, following an earlier gazettal in 1892 as a Reserve for Public Purposes. Following developments, particularly in the early 1910s with the establishment of pathways and seating by the Emu Park Ladies Improvement League, the Reserve became a popular venue. The popularity of the park was re-established during the 1940s when large company picnics were held there. Bell Park is still very much valued by the community and continues to be a focal point as a recreational destination for residents and visitors.

In 1867, residents of Rockhampton signed a petition asking the Surveyor-General to mark out a town at the nearest point on the central Queensland coast where they might be able to enjoy a day at the beach. The place selected was on the Cawarral cattle run, owned by Messrs Ross, Beddome and Palmer. By 9 January 1869, a proclamation appeared in the Queensland Government Gazette declaring Emu Park a Town Reserve.

One of the more important aspects of Emu Park's development occurred with the establishment of the Emu Park railway line from Rockhampton in 1888. The survey for the line was begun in 1885, and on 30 September of that year, Parliament approved a direct line via Lake's Creek. To save the expense of bridging the Fitzroy River, the line started from North Rockhampton, and as a result of this, was to be the creation of two separate railway systems for Rockhampton, similar to Bundaberg. The original survey by Robert Ballard called for a line traversing a mangrove swamp for a distance of six miles (eleven kilometres) for the run into Emu Park. The permanent survey for the line however showed that the Ballard route was situated below the high water mark. A cheaper (but longer) route was adopted instead. Fountain Brothers were awarded the contract on 27 October 1886. Heavy rain interrupted construction, however the line was opened on 22 December 1888, in time for the Christmas period. During its history, sometimes as many as five trains, with up to 13 carriages each, were handled by the turntable at the Emu Park railway station, especially on picnic days.

Whilst the Rockhampton to Emu Park line was predominantly a recreational line, within twenty years of its proclamation, Emu Park, with only a small local population and dependent on Rockhampton for support and assistance in almost every aspect of its development, had a railway line, new school, boarding houses and hotels to cater for visitors as well as other service facilities. Most significant however, were the number of private holiday homes being established in the town

Emu Park was made even more accessible when, in late 1899, the Rockhampton Junction Railway was completed, connecting Rockhampton railway station to North Rockhampton railway stations. As a result, people further afield, including Mount Morgan residents, could enjoy a break at the beach. From the outset, two trains ran each way daily including Sundays and three on Saturdays.

As the town of Emu Park developed, the Emu Park Progress Association, sought to preserve an area facing Fisherman's Beach close to the town. It was an area of greenery, that was considered to be unique in the area. Correspondence of 9 December 1889 requesting the improvement and proclamation of the area as a Park reserve was sent from the Gogango Divisional Board to the Under Secretary for Lands in Brisbane. This request, was initially rejected, but was however, successful later, when in 1892, an area was set aside as a Reserve for Public Purposes. The same area was re-established, in 1899, as a Reserve for Botanic Gardens and Public Purposes. This area was later to be renamed Bell Park.

Originally, the Botanic Gardens Reserve included an area of around 40 acres (16 ha) from Hill to Pybus Streets and from the coast to the railway yards. The gazettal was sought to preserve the "natural" garden space rather than any intention to create a formal botanic garden. Located on the sea front, the Botanic Gardens was considered to be an oasis of beauty and recreation for families and visitors, in the middle of the original Emu Park township. In 1906, the Livingstone Shire Council [The Livingstone Shire was formed by a change of name from Gogango Shire on 8 August 1903] requested the Deeds of the Botanic Gardens Reserve and the adjacent Fishermen's Reserve. This was granted and gazetted on 16 May 1908.

Whilst it was gazetted as a Reserve by 1892, the Botanic Gardens Reserve did not become easily accessible to the public until the early 1910s. By 1915, souvenir pamphlets on Emu Park advertised the assets that was the Botanic Gardens Reserve. At this point, Reserve was still predominantly dense brush and was described as breaking the "unvarying sweep of the shore." Also by this time, the care and maintenance of the Reserve was being undertaken by the Emu Park Ladies' Improvement League, headed by the President, Mrs Emily Jane Bell.

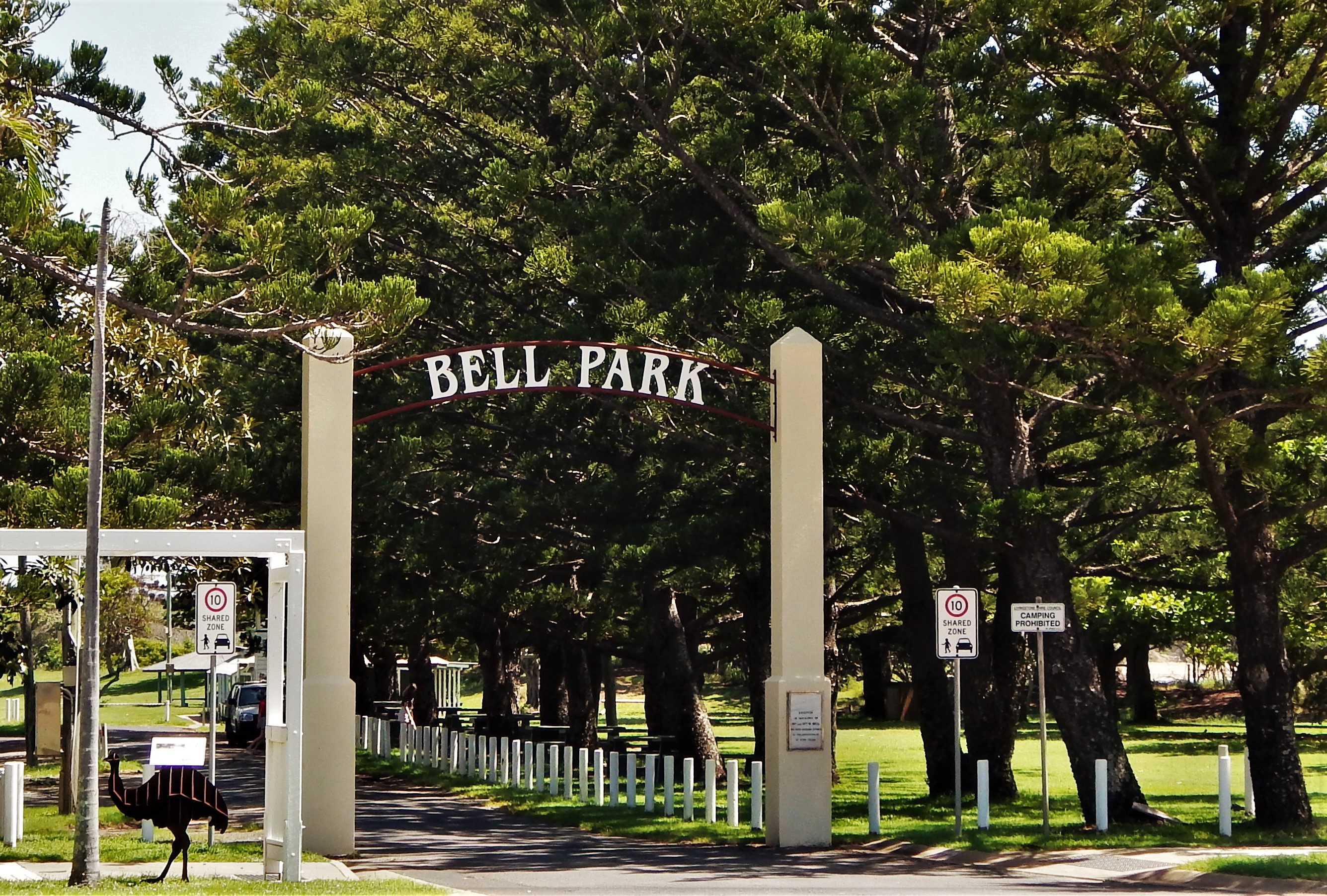
Entrance to Bell Park, 2020

The League had a small fund to carry out works such as the opening up of pathways and the provision of seats and tables. By c. 1920, the timber rotundas had been constructed in the Park. It was suggested at the time that, whatever is done in the direction of upkeep and maintenance should be done carefully and that the all too common error of opening up straight tracks of any sort to the beach, should be "most carefully avoided." The Botanic Gardens was renamed Bell Park in 1934, in recognition of Mrs Emily Jane Bell and her late husband Mr William Irving Bell and their role in organising the opening up and maintenance of the park.

By the end of the 1940s, the days of large, company and community picnics had become well established. The annual picnics of the Central Queensland Meat Export Company at Lakes Creek and the Railways Department at Rockhampton, developed into huge proportions. The Mount Morgan community, particularly those associated with the mine also showed much support for Emu Park as it was the only resort on the coast that was easily accessible by train.

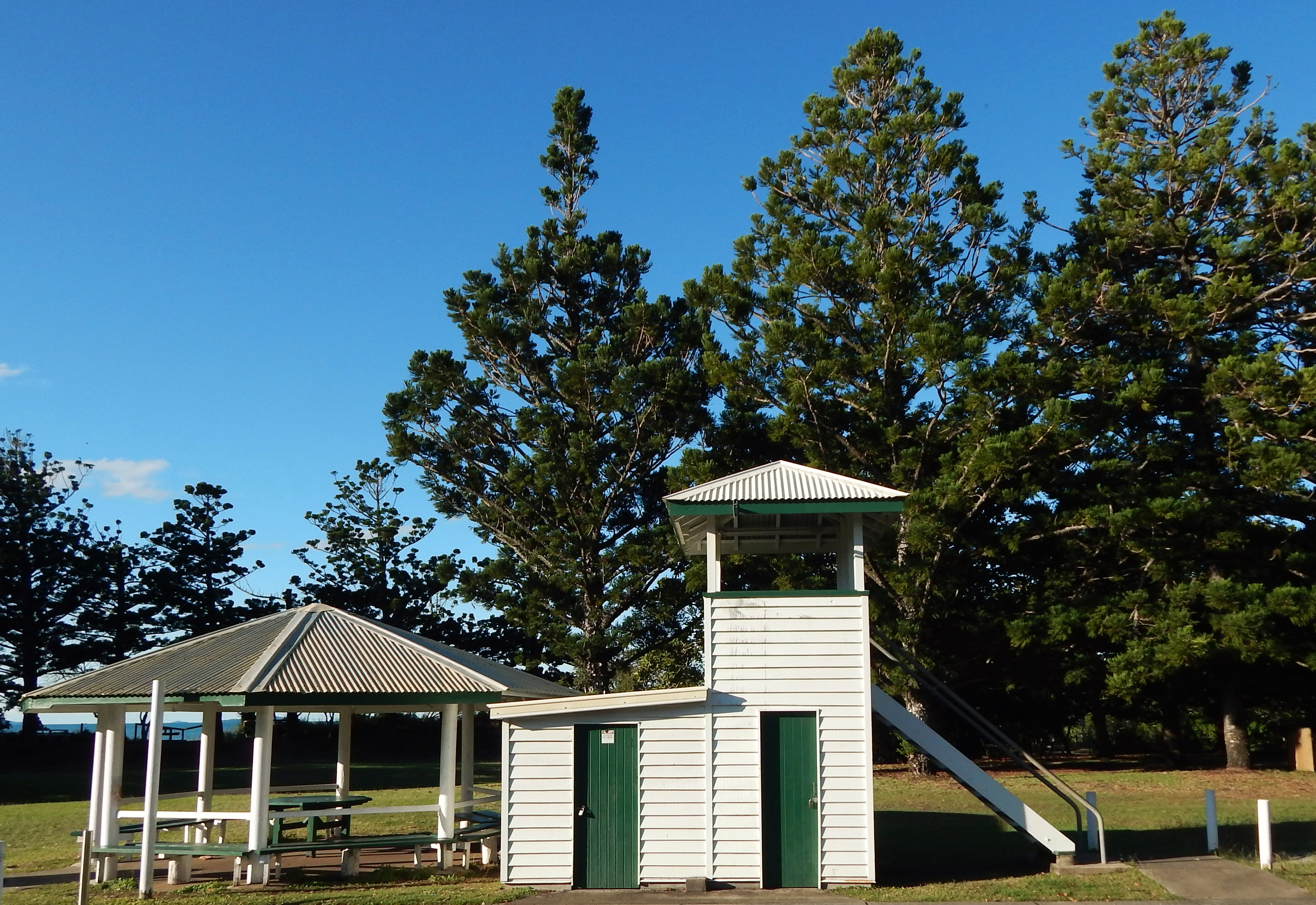
Timber tower at Bell Park, 2022

Earlier in Emu Park's history, Mount Morgan Limited had arranged for picnics for employees, however these ceased after 1927. By 1949, when a social club run by employees was established, picnics of the mine employees continued once again. The social club developed its annual picnic at Bell Park, often with 3000 or more people attending. An advance party of four would arrive at Emu Park three days before to prepare the ground and other necessary arrangements for marquees, races and catering. On the day of the picnic, which was generally near the May Day weekend, the first train left Mount Morgan at dawn, with the last train returning by midnight.

A section of Bell Park with a long, grassed area is suggested to be the area where races were held. The races were called by a person located in a nearby timber tower.

On 3 August 1950, the Botanic Gardens proclamation was rescinded in favour of a Park and Recreation Reserve (R666) and a Camping and Recreation Reserve in two parts (R665 - which now comprises Lots 31 and 92). A caravan park is now established on Lot 31 and controlled by Livingstone Shire Council as is a swimming pool complex.

Recently in a study on open spaces and recreation areas in the Livingstone Shire, it was recommended that areas of cultural significance and high scenic value be protected. As one of the most popular parks in the Livingstone Shire, Bell Park is included in this study.

== Description ==
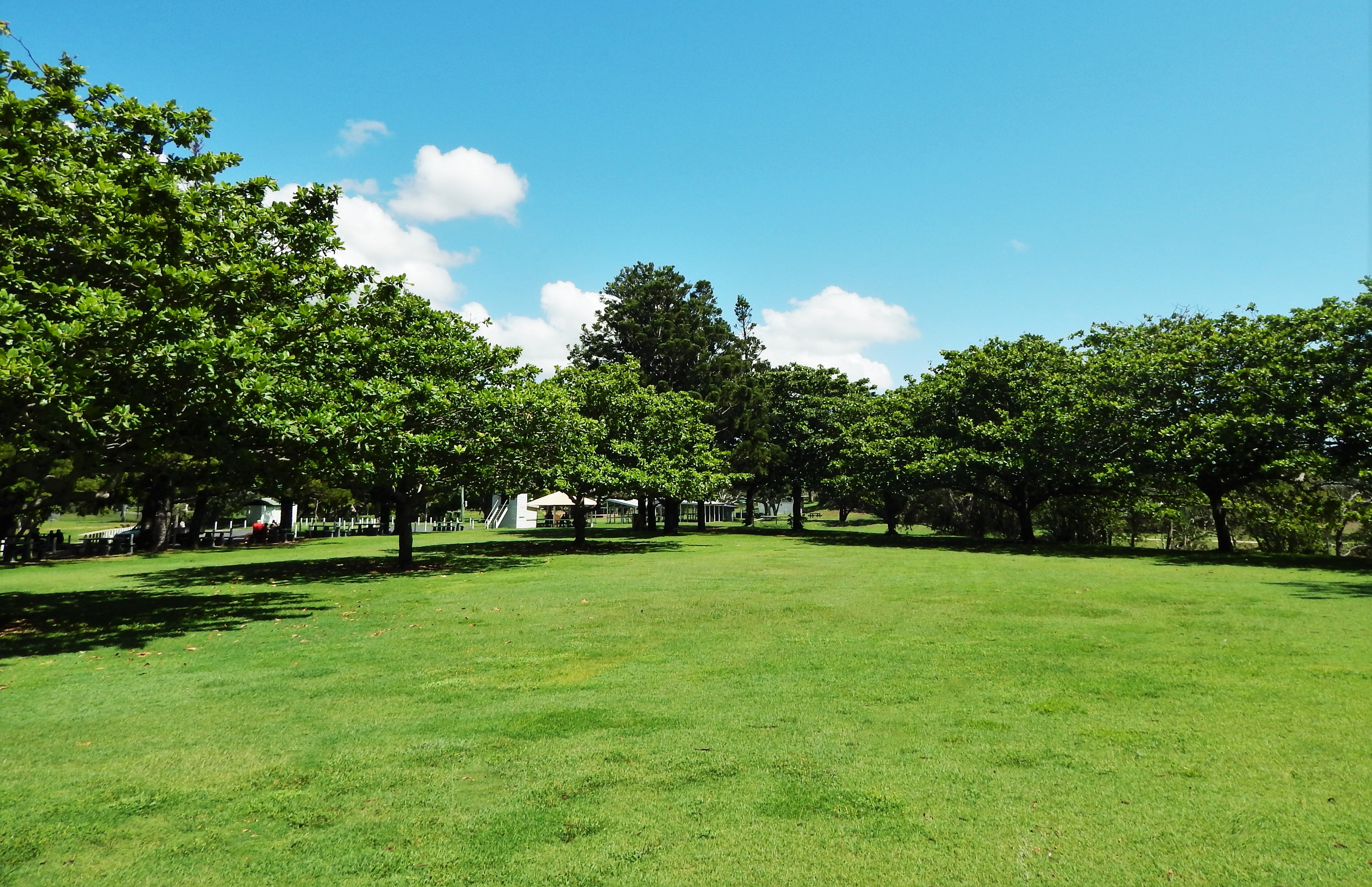
Bell Park, 2020

The Botanic Garden remnant known as Bell Park consists of Park and Recreation Reserve. The Park is an area of 11 hectares (27 acres) bounded on the south by Hill Street, to the west by the caravan park and swimming complex, to the north by Lions Park and to the east by the Pacific Ocean. No longer a densely vegetated area as it was described in the 1890s, Bell Park has large, open, grassed areas with some more formally planted rows of hoop pines, particularly in the southern section of the park.

Access to Bell Park is from Hill Street with low timber fencing marking the car park area from the remainder of the park. Bell Park contains a range of mature pines on the eastern border [sea side] and open grassed areas. Other areas of mature vegetation include hoop pines along the Hill Street entrance to the park; pines and coconut palms in the south-west corner; along the western boundary near the caravan park and particularly, in the northern end of the park, an area that generally, has less infrastructure than the remainder of the reserve.

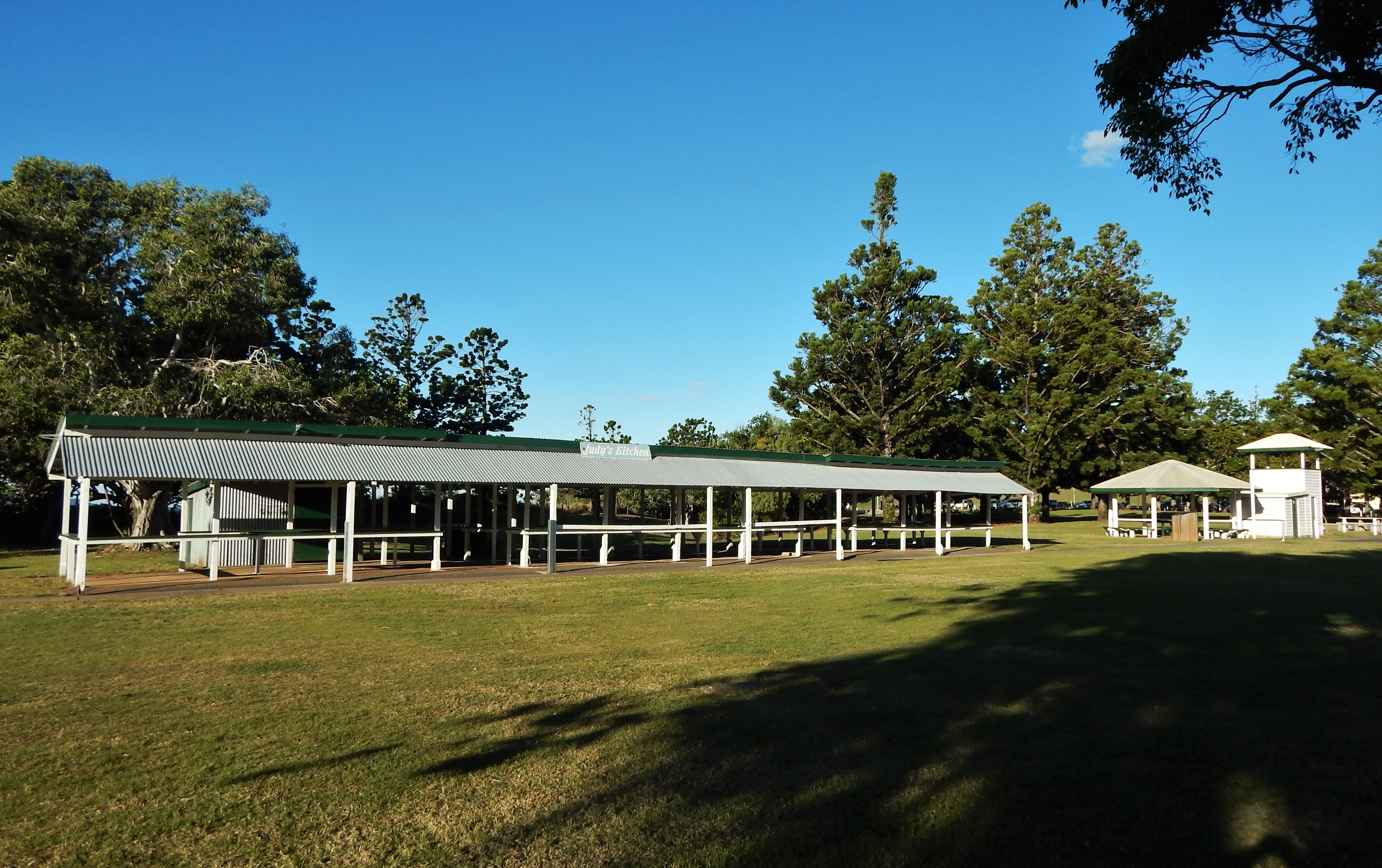
Infrastructure at Bell Park, 2022

Structures within Bell Park include a timber tower thought to be a judges box/starters box, near this structure is a large, open grassed area said to be a runners track; two timber rotundas, one constructed with tree trunks for uprights, while the second rotunda has uprights made from sawn timber. A timber stall is located to the north of the timber tower and located near this stall is a large, mature ficus sp.

Bell Park has other facilities available including toilets, play equipment, footbridges and concrete pathways for pedestrian access. A brick stage with a concreted area is also located in the park.

== Heritage listing ==
Bell Park was listed on the Queensland Heritage Register on 29 April 2003 having satisfied the following criteria.

The place is important in demonstrating the evolution or pattern of Queensland's history.

Bell Park is significant for its continued use as a cultural and recreational destination at Emu Park, which was established as a resort town for the people of Rockhampton and surrounding areas in the 1860s.

The place demonstrates rare, uncommon or endangered aspects of Queensland's cultural heritage.

Further, the judges box and the associated running track are particularly significant for their rarity.

The place is important because of its aesthetic significance.

With its mature vegetation and landscaped areas, built structures including timber rotundas and judges box, and its sweeping easterly views toward the Pacific Ocean, Bell Park is significant for its visual amenity and for the contribution it makes to the Emu Park townscape.

The place has a strong or special association with a particular community or cultural group for social, cultural or spiritual reasons.

Bell Park is especially important for its strong social significance. For over 100 years, the area has held a special association with the people of Emu Park and surrounding area, with the community actively involved in the gazettal of the original densely vegetated area in the early 1890s, through to the activities of the Emu Park Progress Association and Emu Park Ladies Improvement League and later, when large company and community picnics were held in the grounds of the park. Bell Park is generally held in high regard by the community and is a popular place for visitors to Emu Park.
