= Singing Ship =

Australian monument to James Cook

The Singing Ship
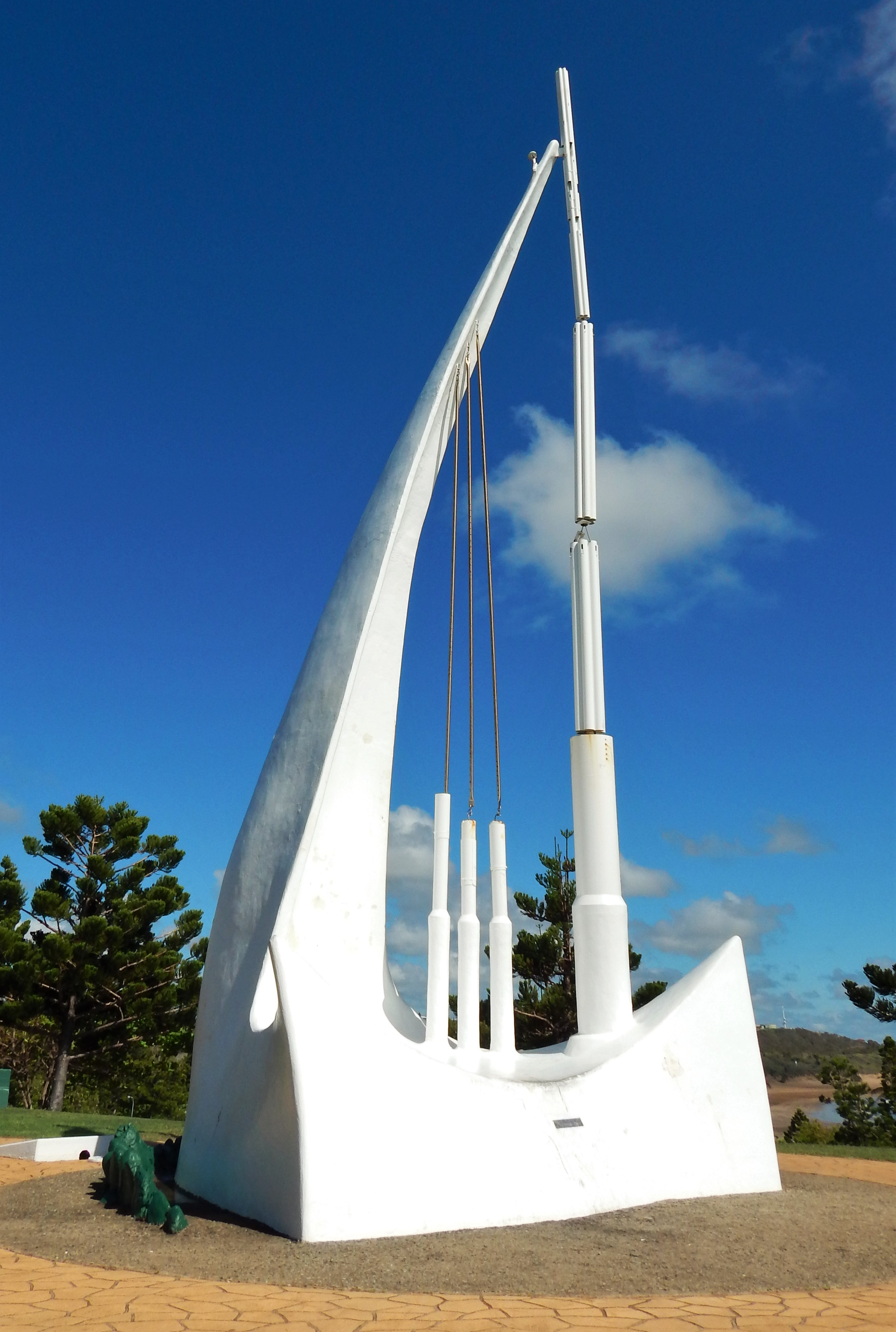
- Singing Ship, 2014
- Interactive map of The Singing Ship
- Location: Tennent Memorial Drive, Emu Park, Queensland
- Coordinates: 23.256214°S 150.829087°E
- Designer: Peggy Westmoreland
- Material: concrete and steel
- Height: 12 metres
- Beginning date: 1969
- Completion date: 1970
- Opening date: 30 May 1970
- Dedicated to: James Cook

The Singing Ship is a 12-metre tall concrete and steel monument located in Emu Park, Shire of Livingstone, Queensland, Australia.

The monument is notable for using wind to enable it to make a unique whistling sound, making it "sing".

Located at Churchill's Lookout on Constitution Hill, the monument commemorates James Cook's voyage through Keppel Bay in May 1770. It was officially unveiled by Minister for Shipping Ian Sinclair on 30 May 1970.

The monument was designed by Bajool art teacher Peggy Westmoreland who won a competition in 1969 held by the Captain Cook Bicentenary Celebrations Committee which sought possible ways to commemorate the 200th anniversary of Cook's voyage and his exploration of Keppel Bay in May 1770.

Westmoreland was the joint first winner of the competition along with the Lions Club of Yeppoon which had submitted a proposal to establish a youth holiday camp on Great Keppel Island. The winners received a prize of $100. The Singing Ship project was adopted in favour of the Lion Club's proposal due to time constraints.

Westmoreland originally abandoned her design and disposed of it. However, her husband retrieved it from a rubbish bin and encouraged her to complete it.

After the Bicentenary Celebrations Committee decided to use Westmoreland's design to construct a "singing ship", fundraising efforts commenced with a target of $5,000. Donations were received from Livingstone Shire Council, Rockhampton City Council, Fitzroy Shire Council and the Rockhampton & District Historical Society. The Lions Club of Yeppoon also donated their prize money to the project.

Churchill's Lookout on Constitution Hill was selected as the preferred site for the monument which was constructed by builders Steve and Isabel Kele, engineer David Thomas, and physics lecturer George Cain.

The design of the monument incorporated steel pipes, designed by Cain, for wind to pass through to make the ship "sing".

A plaque at the base of the monument states that the Singing Ship was erected to honour Captain James Cook who discovered and named Keppel Bay between 26 May 1770 and 28 May 1770.

Five years after its official unveiling, a time capsule was placed at the base of the monument which is scheduled to be opened in 2070.

The Singing Ship was repaired after sustaining damage from Cyclone Marcia in 2015.

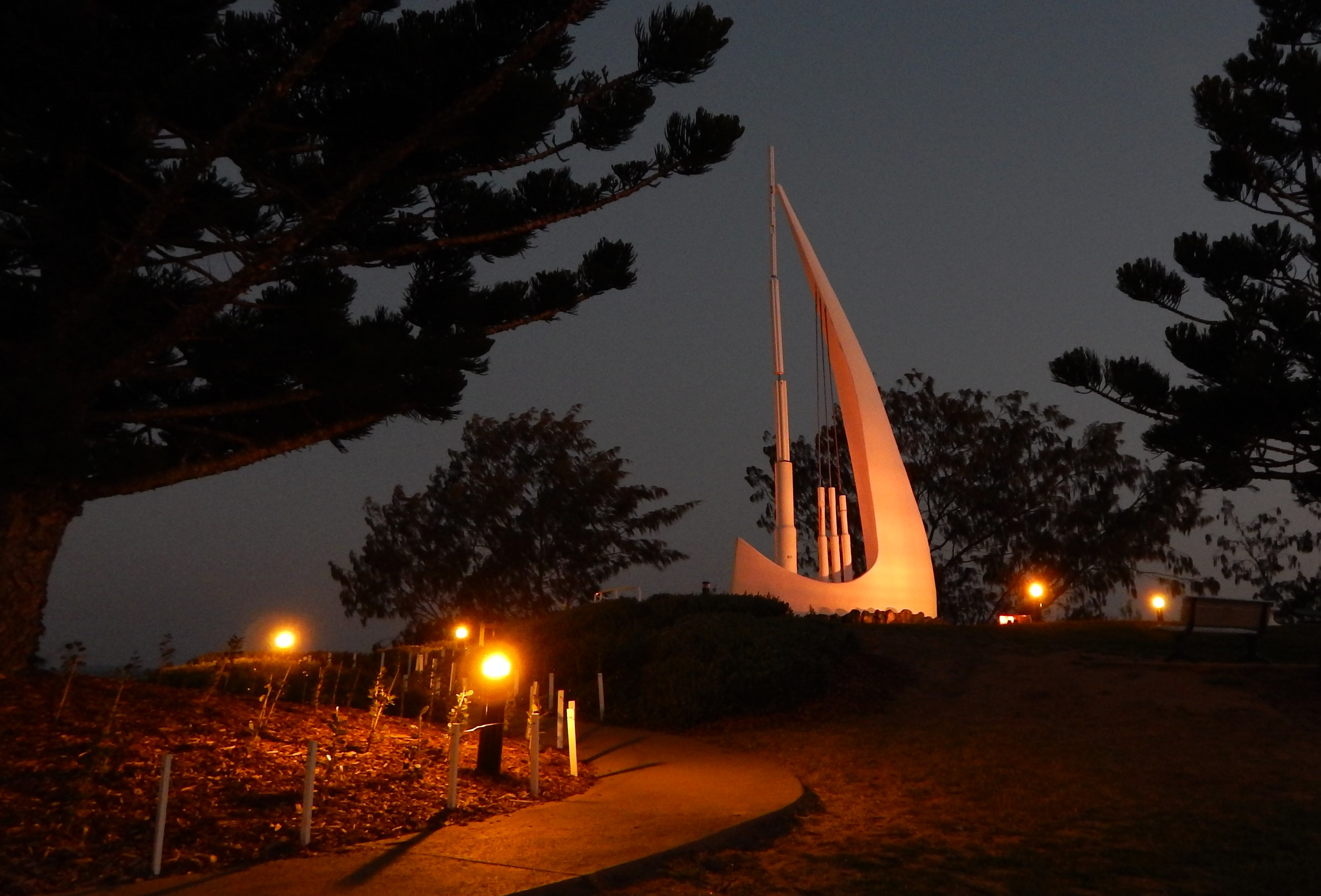
Singing Ship, 2019

In September 2015, it was reported that a pathway would be constructed up to the Singing Ship from the lookout which was constructed as part of the second stage of the Emu Park Anzac Memorial beachfront precinct.

In 2019, local resident Claire Ryan published a book about the monument's history entitled "The Singing Ship: Captain and Crew".

The monument's 50th anniversary was celebrated in 2020.

The Singing Ship is frequently promoted as one of the Capricorn Coast's premier tourist attractions. As such, the Singing Ship has become an iconic symbol of Emu Park and the surrounding district.

Depictions of the monument have been incorporated into a number of logos such as those belonging to Livingstone Shire Council, Emu Park State School and Club Emu Park.

A 3D graphics model render of the singing ship was included into an update for Australia in Microsoft Flight Simulator (2020) and Microsoft Flight Simulator (2024) in 2026.
