= Zilzie =

- Suburb
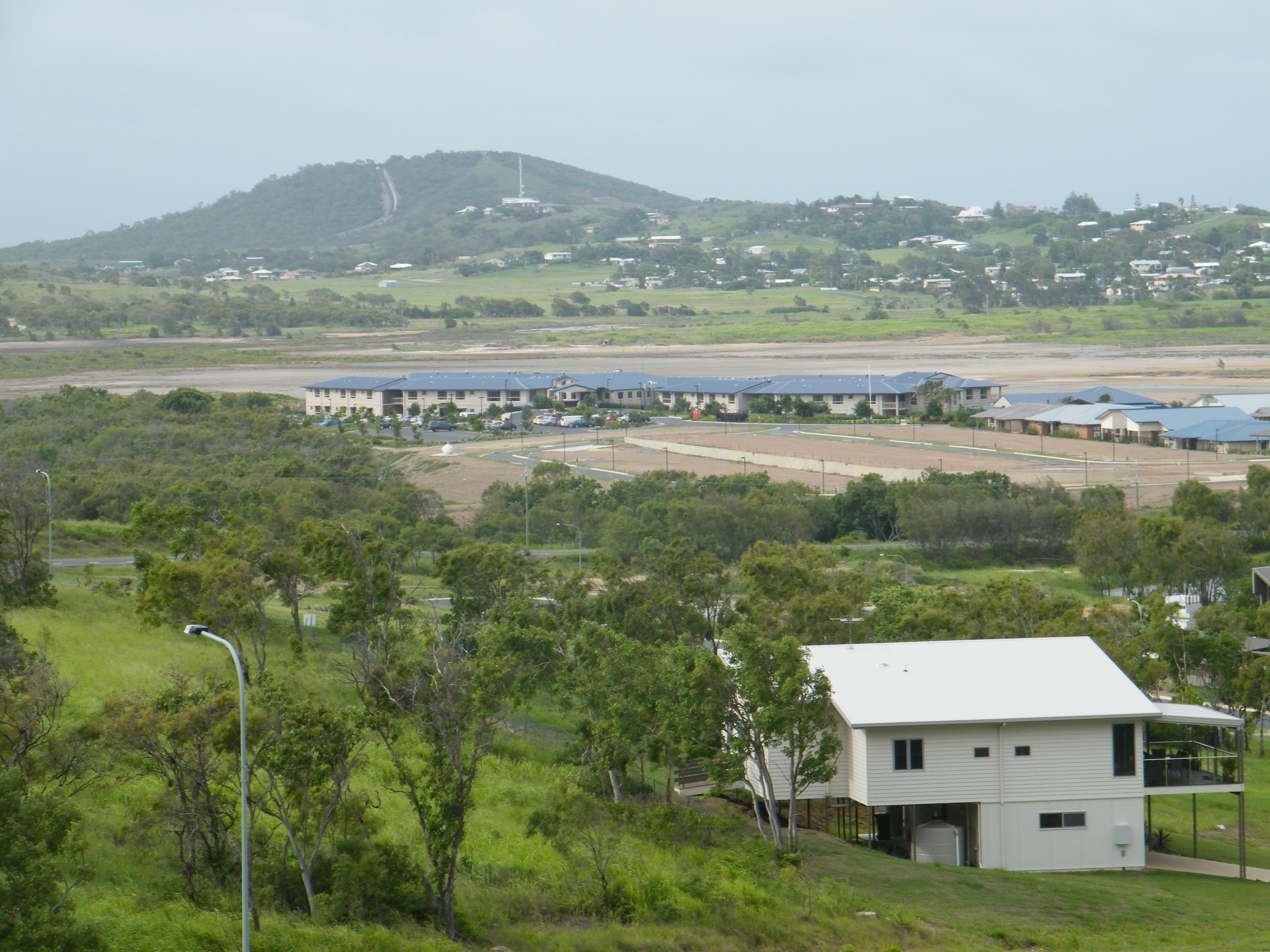
- Looking over the Seaspray estate in Zilzie

- Interactive map of Zilzie
- Coordinates: 23.2961°S 150.8097°E
- Country: Australia
- State: Queensland
- LGA: Shire of Livingstone
- Location: 1.8 km (1.1 mi) S of Emu Park; 22.4 km (13.9 mi) SSE of Yeppoon; 46.5 km (28.9 mi) ENE of Rockhampton; 682 km (424 mi) NNW of Brisbane

Government
  - State electorate: Keppel
  - Federal division: Capricornia

Area
  - Total: 34.0 km^{2} (13.1 sq mi)

Population
  - Total: 2,846 (2021 census)
  - Density: 83.71/km^{2} (216.8/sq mi)
- Time zone: UTC+10:00 (AEST)
- Postcode: 4710
Suburbs around Zilzie
Emu Park	Emu Park	Emu Park
Coorooman	Zilzie	The Keppels
Coorooman	Keppel Sands	Keppel Sands

Zilzie is a coastal locality in the Livingstone Shire, Queensland, Australia. In the 2021 census, Zilzie had a population of 2,846 people.

== Geography ==
Contiguous with Emu Park, the town is located on the Capricorn Coast, 685 kilometres (426 mi) north north west of the state capital, Brisbane 32 kilometres (20 mi) east of the city of Rockhampton and approx 23.3 kilometres (14.5 mi) south of Yeppoon.

Zilzie has the following headlands (from north to south):

- Rocky Point (23.2682°S 150.8285°E)
- Arthurs Point (23.2743°S 150.8257°E)
- Zilzie Point (23.2798°S 150.8245°E)
- Cocoanut Point (23.2885°S 150.8134°E)

The Cocoanut Point section of the Capricorn Coast National Park is located around Cocoanut Point between the Zilzie resort and Seaspray estate.

== History ==
Zilzie was named after Zilzie Point, the coastal northern end of the suburb, which was named after a property in the area which was owned by Arthur Bootle Wilbraham, who made an anagram of Lizzie (née Jardine), the name of his wife.

Between 2008 and 2013, Zilzie and the rest of the Shire of Livingstone were part of the Rockhampton Region.

== Demographics ==
In the 2006 census, Zilzie had a population of 1,153 people.

In the 2011 census, Zilzie had a population of 1,890 people.

In the 2016 census, Zilzie had a population of 2,713 people.

In the 2021 census, Zilzie had a population of 2,846 people.

== Education ==
There are no schools in Zilzie. The nearest government primary school is Emu Park State School in neighbouring Emu Park to the north. The nearest government secondary school is Yeppoon State High School in Yeppoon to the north.

== Amenities ==
There is a boat ramp and a floating walkway in Svendsen Road on the north bank of Coorooman Creek (23.2994°S 150.7692°E). They are managed by the Livingstone Shire Council.

== Facilities ==
Emu Park-Zilzie Sewage Treatment Plant is at 3620 Emu Park Road (23.2627°S 150.8103°E).
