= Emu Park, Queensland =

Emu Park
- Town
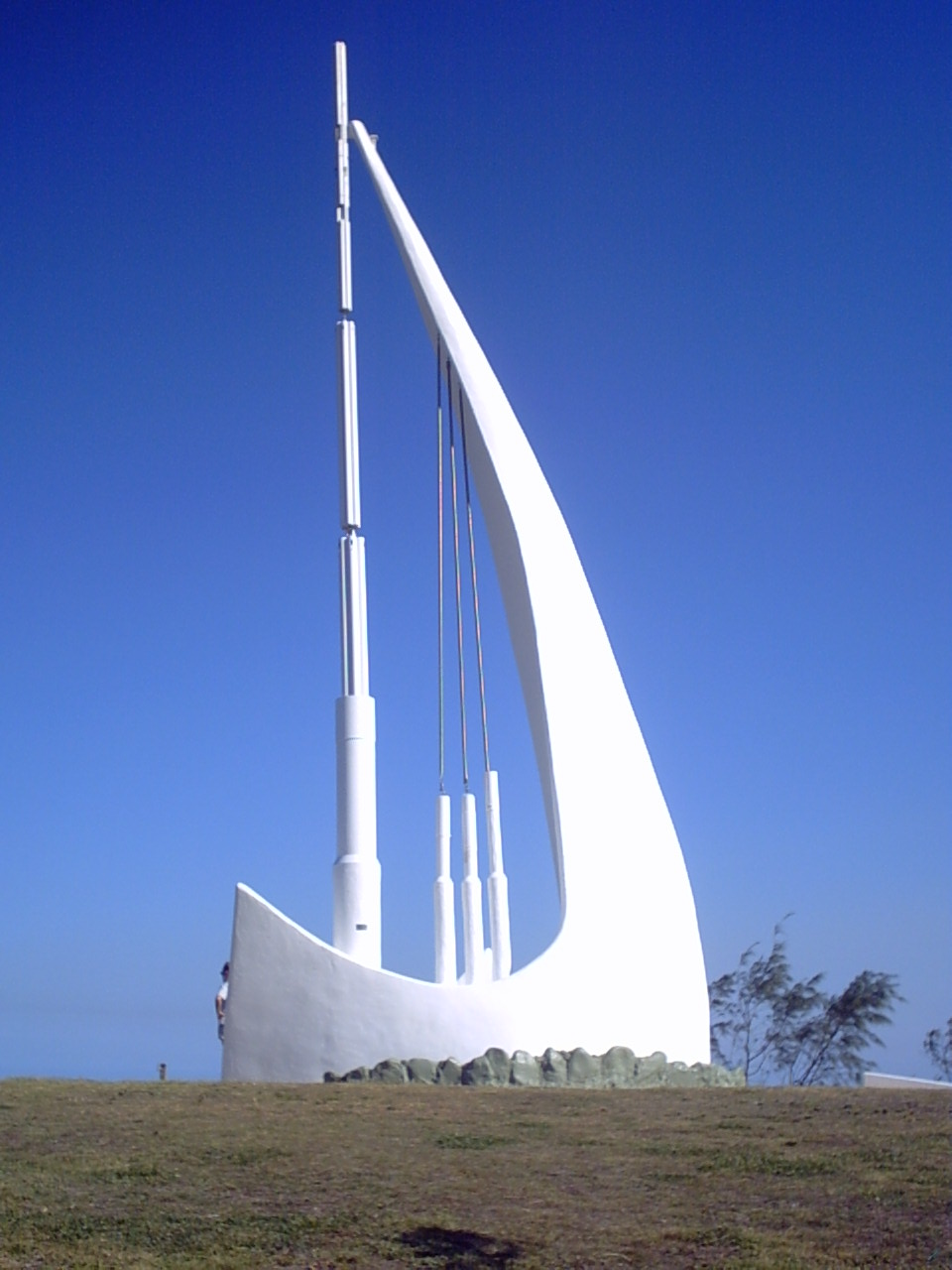
- The Singing Ship monument

- Interactive map of Emu Park
- Coordinates: 23.2592°S 150.8238°E
- Country: Australia
- State: Queensland
- LGA: Shire of Livingstone
- Location: 26 km (16 mi) SSE of Yeppoon; 50.2 km (31.2 mi) NE of Rockhampton; 668 km (415 mi) NNW of Brisbane
- Established: 1860s

Government
  - State electorate: Keppel
  - Federal division: Capricornia

Area
  - Total: 39.4 km^{2} (15.2 sq mi)

Population
  - Total: 2,281 (2021 census)
  - Density: 57.89/km^{2} (149.94/sq mi)
- Time zone: UTC+10:00 (AEST)
- Postcode: 4710
Localities around Emu Park
Kinka Beach	Kinka Beach	The Keppels
Tanby	Emu Park	The Keppels
Coorooman	Zilzie	Zilzie

Emu Park is a coastal town and locality on the Capricorn Coast located 21 kilometres (13 mi) south of Yeppoon in Queensland, Australia. It is within the local government area of Shire of Livingstone (between 2008 and 2013, it was within the Rockhampton Region). In the 2021 census, the locality of Emu Park had a population of 2,281 people.

The Emu Park land area was explored by Lieutenant James Cook in 1770; it is commemorated by the Singing Ship Monument. Emu Park overlooks the islands of Keppel Bay, including Great Keppel Island.

== Geography ==
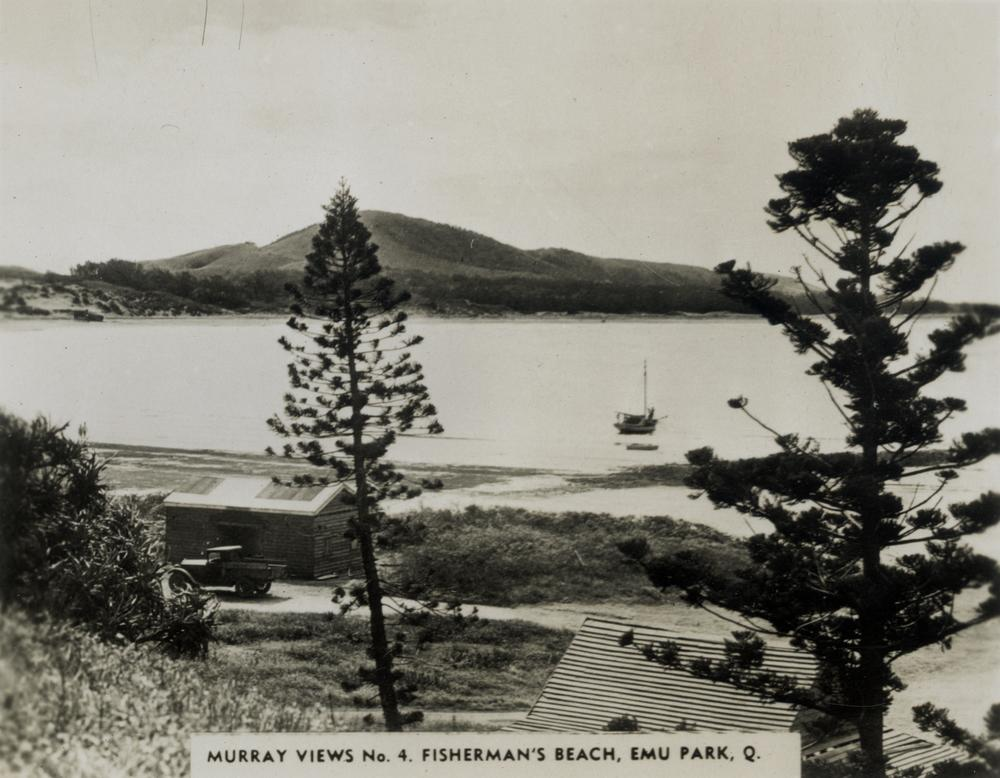
Fisherman's Beach at Emu Park, Queensland, circa 1940

Emu Park is part of the Capricorn Coast in Central Queensland.

Off-shore to the north is Shoal Bay (23.2185°S 150.8110°E).

Emu Park has the following coast features (from north to south):

- Tanby Point (23.2362°S 150.8280°E)
- Fishermans Beach (23.2485°S 150.8240°E)
- Emu Point (23.2552°S 150.8293°E)

The northern part of the locality is mostly undeveloped wetlands around Shoal Water Creek (23.2358°S 150.7977°E) which flows into Shoal Bay, while the southern part of the locality is undeveloped wetlands around an unnamed creek. The eastern strip of the locality near the coast is urban in character with housing and services. The centre and west of the locality is mostly used for grazing on native vegetation with some areas of rural residential housing.

Emu Park Airstrip is at the northern end of Henry Street (23.2550°S 150.8144°E).

== History ==
=== Early settlement ===
The Keppel Bay area was explored by Lieutenant James Cook on the HM Bark Endeavour in May 1770. He named the bay after Admiral Augustus Keppel of the Royal Navy.

British settlement began in the 1860s when John Jardine established a cattle grazing property south of the current town, at Zilzie, an anagram of Lizzie, the eldest of John Jardine's daughters.

Emu Park township was established in the 1870s when several Rockhampton families built seaside holiday houses on the hills overlooking the two beaches that are a feature of the town – Fisherman's Beach and Pine Beach.

Hewittville Post Office opened on 12 November 1883 (a receiving office had been open from 1876) and was renamed Emu Park in 1890.

Emu Park State School opened on 3 February 1890. The school was burned down on 26 July 1946 and all early records of the school were lost in the blaze. The hall was used as a temporary school. The new school building was designed with 2 classrooms for a total 60 students at a cost of £2315.

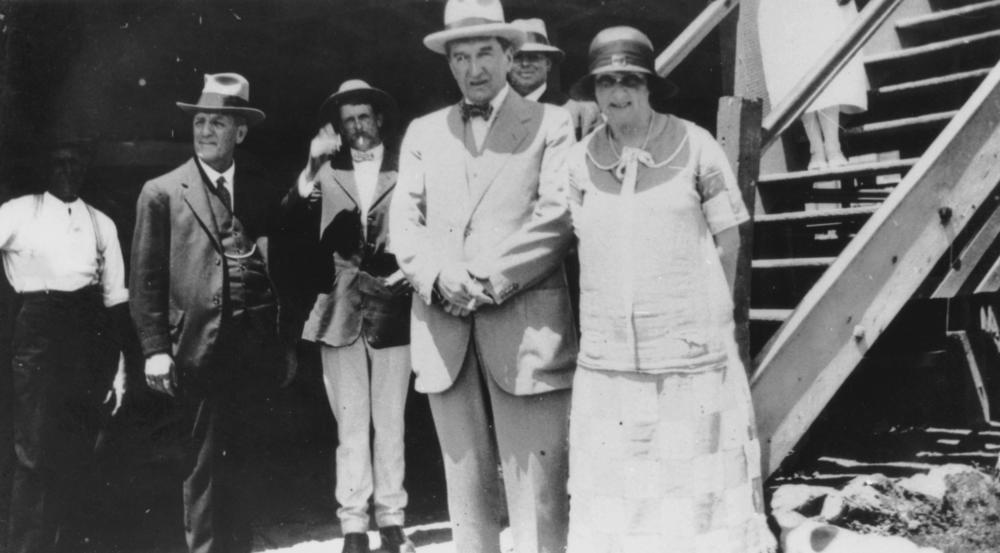
Prime Minister Stanley Bruce and Mrs Bruce at Emu Park, 1926

=== Central business district ===
Soon after the town was settled, a commercial area was established in and around Hill Street. Some of the early stores included a general store, a grocery store, butcher shop, bakery, and a combined sweet and haberdashery store.

By the 1920s the town had two large hotels, a cinema, court house, public library, shops and many guest houses for visitors. A small pier was opened by Ethel Bruce, wife of the Prime Minister, Stanley Bruce, in 1926 and Bell Park, a shady park on the shores of Fisherman's Beach was established in the 1930s.

The town's general store was owned by several families over the years including the Ryan, Mills and Bundesen families.

A haberdashery and sweet shop was owned by well known community stalwart Henny Power.

A grocery shop was owned by several families before being bought by the Notaras family who converted the shop into Seagulls Cafe. It was then bought by the Stouraitis family who ran a fish and chip shop from the building before it was destroyed in a fire in 1961.

The Large family leased the Central Cafe in 1934 where they established the Britanic Cafe selling meals while also offering a range of groceries. The shop remained in the family until 1982. It was later bought by the Charlesworth family who ran it as a local grocery store "Charlie's Corner" until 2012 when it closed after the opening of the town's first supermarket the previous year. In 2018, the Emu Park Post Office was relocated to the building.

A general merchant's shop was located in Archer Street next to the Catholic Church from the 1890s until its closure in 1940. Known as "The Village Store" when it was run by the Ryan family, it sold a large variety of grocery items including local produce traded with South Sea Islanders. The building was demolished in the 1980s.

The original butcher shop was built on the corner of Hill and Archer Street in 1912 and closed in 1996 before a new butcher shop was established. The first newsagency opened in a shop beside the Grand Central Hotel in 1938, beside a bakery.

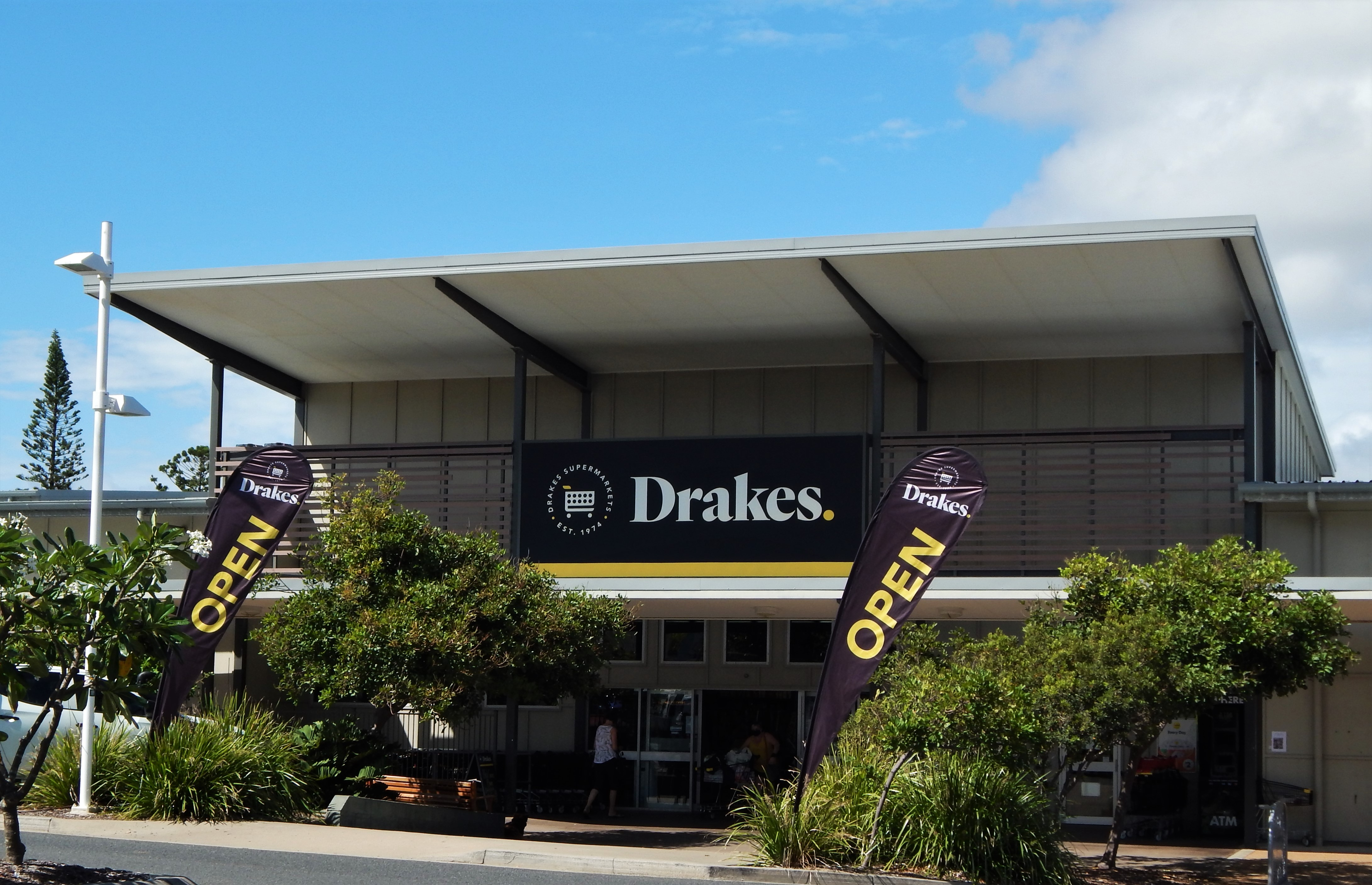
Drakes Supermarket, 2022

In 2011, the town's first supermarket was opened when the Emu Park Village Centre, anchored by a Super IGA-branded supermarket (owned by Drakes Supermarkets), was opened. The popularity of the new supermarket contributed to the closure of the town's firmly established general store, Charlie's Corner, which ceased trading on 30 November 2012. A compliance issue regarding Sunday trading forced Supa IGA to temporarily cease trading on Sundays in 2014, leaving the town without a grocery store for one day of the week which caused much angst and frustration in the community. The issue was resolved soon after. In line with the other 21 Drakes-owned stores in Queensland, the Supa IGA branding was completely dropped and the Emu Park supermarket was solely rebranded as a Drakes Supermarkets store in 2017.

As of 2022, a large variety of small businesses continue to trade in town's central business district, including two bakeries, several cafes and takeaway outlets, a newsagency, the post office, a chemist, a butcher shop, a petrol station, real estate agencies, a charity shop, a tobacco shop, a discount store, hair and beauty outlets and a community bank.

=== Railway ===
From 1888 to 1964, Emu Park was serviced by the North Rockhampton to Emu Park railway line. A branch to Yeppoon, further to the north was opened in 1910.

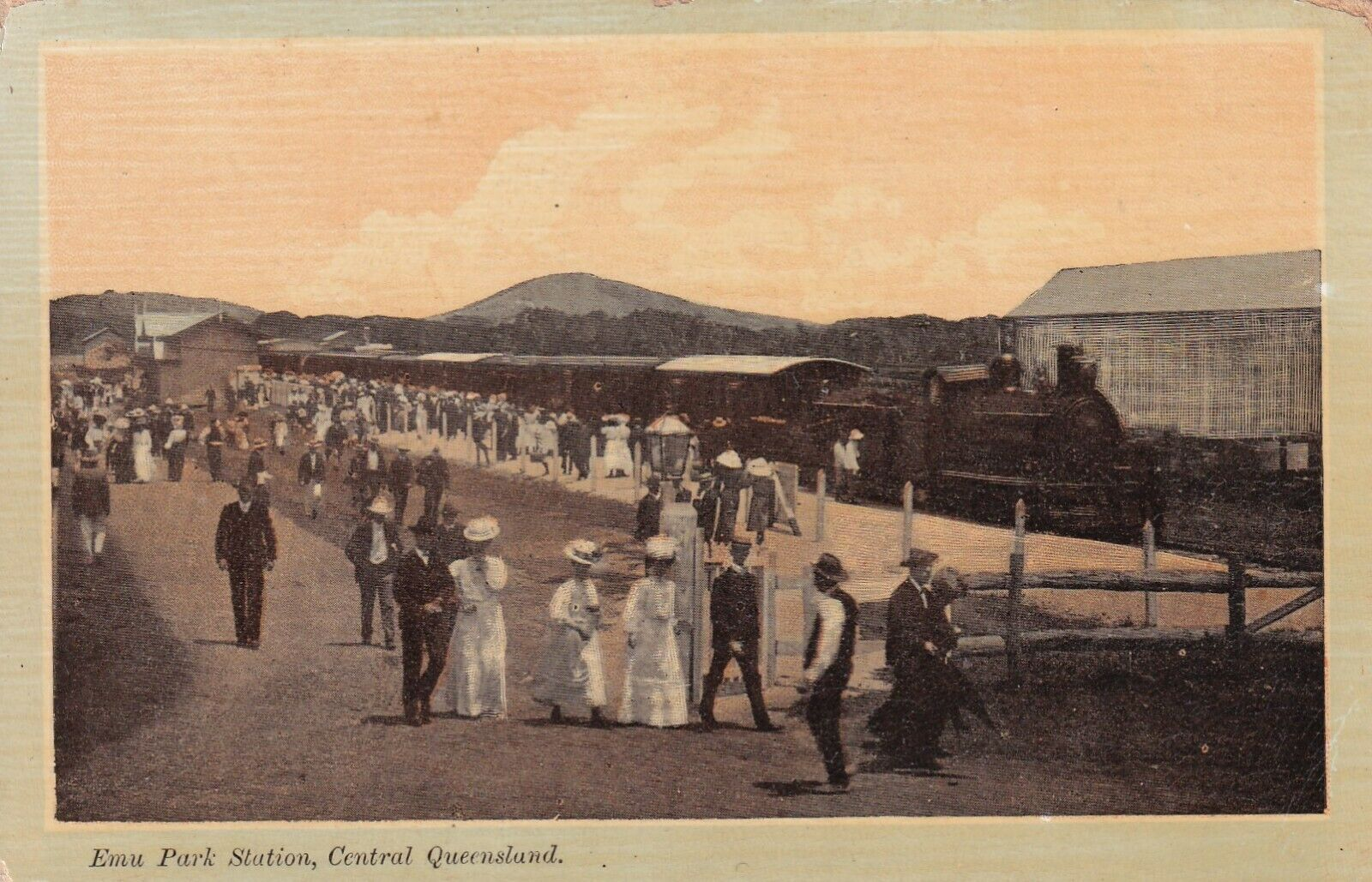
Emu Park railway station, circa 1908

The railway officially opened on 22 December 1888. The original trains that serviced Emu Park from Rockhampton ran from North Rockhampton railway station prior to the Alexandra Railway Bridge across the Fitzroy River being opened in 1899 connecting the line with the stations on the southern side of Rockhampton including Archer Park and the main Stanley Street station.

The original railway line was surveyed as a more direct route to Emu Park with the line coming into the town from the western side of Emu Park instead of the more indirect route which was eventually chosen through Tanby and into the town from the north which increased the length of the line to 29 miles from the original 20 mile line originally surveyed.

The commuter trains were established in 1914, which took workers and school students to Rockhampton each morning.

The Emu Park railway station and engine sheds received considerable damage from the 1949 Central Queensland cyclone. The carriage shed was completely destroyed while the other shed was demolished. The railway station was repaired.

Until a high school was built in Yeppoon, local secondary students used the train to travel to Rockhampton, departing at 6:55am each morning.

The Emu Park station master lived in a residence with a detached kitchen in Hill Street. After the line was closed, the house was demolished and the Emu Park Cultural Centre was built on the site.

There was a turntable for locomotives to be turned around installed in 1905, remnants of which are still visible outside the Don Ireland Swimming Complex. Before the line closed, an overhead bridge was built across the railway line near Albermarle Street.

The railway closed on 30 June 1964.

The railway goods shed built in 1888 remained in the railway precinct until 1992 when the Emu Park Lions Club successfully applied to have the building relocated with the intention for it to be used as a youth clubhouse. "The Shack" opened in 1994. It was extended in 2016 and continues to be used by the Lions Club as their clubhouse and for organised youth activities.

The former railway precinct is now the site of the Emu Park bus interchange and the Emu Park Community Arts Centre which was opened in 2020.

The railway line from North Rockhampton was officially opened on Saturday 22 December 1888 by Archibald Archer, the local Member of the Queensland Legislative Assembly for Rockhampton. Emu Park railway station was on the northern corner of Hill Street and Pattison Street (23.2567°S 150.8262°E).

=== Churches ===
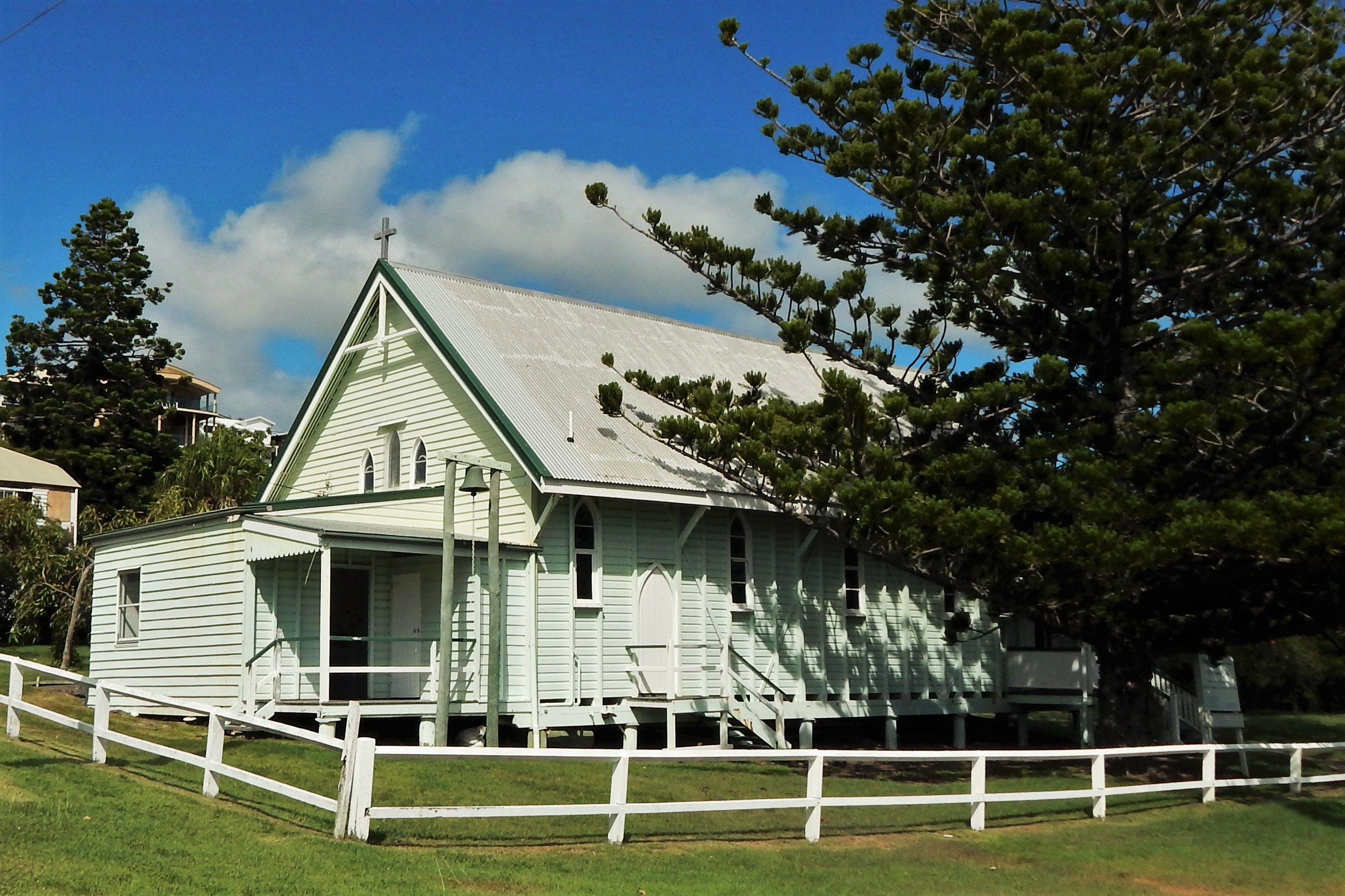
Anglican church, 2022

In November 1893, Emu Park's first church was the Christ Church (a Church of England church), a timber building constructed on the corner of Fountain Street and Hill Street opposite Emu Park State School. After access to the site proved difficult during wet weather, the church was relocated to its existing location on the corner of Archer Street and Hunter Street. The church was extended in 1919 to provide more comfort for the vicars who would travel down by buggy from Rockhampton. The church was restored in 1984 and continues to hold services.

The second church to be built in Emu Park was the original Mary Immaculate Catholic Church which was opened in Archer Street on 25 September 1904. A school room was opened under the presbytery at the back of the building in 1917. The school was moved into a neighbouring property in 1920 and became known as St Agnes' Convent School. The church was enlarged with two wings and a sacristy added to the building. The renovated church opened on 23 December 1923. The school was renovated in 1959 and remained in use until 1965. The original church was demolished in 1974 when it became unsafe. The vacant school building was transformed into a church and opened on 26 May 1974. By 1984, the former school building was struggling to accommodate the large congregation and funds were raised to build a brand new church building which was opened on 8 December 1984, close to where the original 1904 building once stood. The Mary Immaculate Catholic continues to hold services. The church's centenary was celebrated on 25 November 2004.

The existing Uniting Church building in Archer Street was originally built as a billiard saloon which was opened in December 1916 by Thomas Charles Lachlan. The saloon was forced to close when most of the young men who used the venue enlisted in the armed services during World War I. The Methodist Church purchased the building in November 1919. Following the amalgamation of the Methodist Church into the Uniting Church in Australia in 1977, it became the Emu Park Uniting Church. Although the building needed repairs after sustaining damage during Tropical Cyclone Marcia in 2015, weekly church services continue to be held from the building.

=== Hotels ===
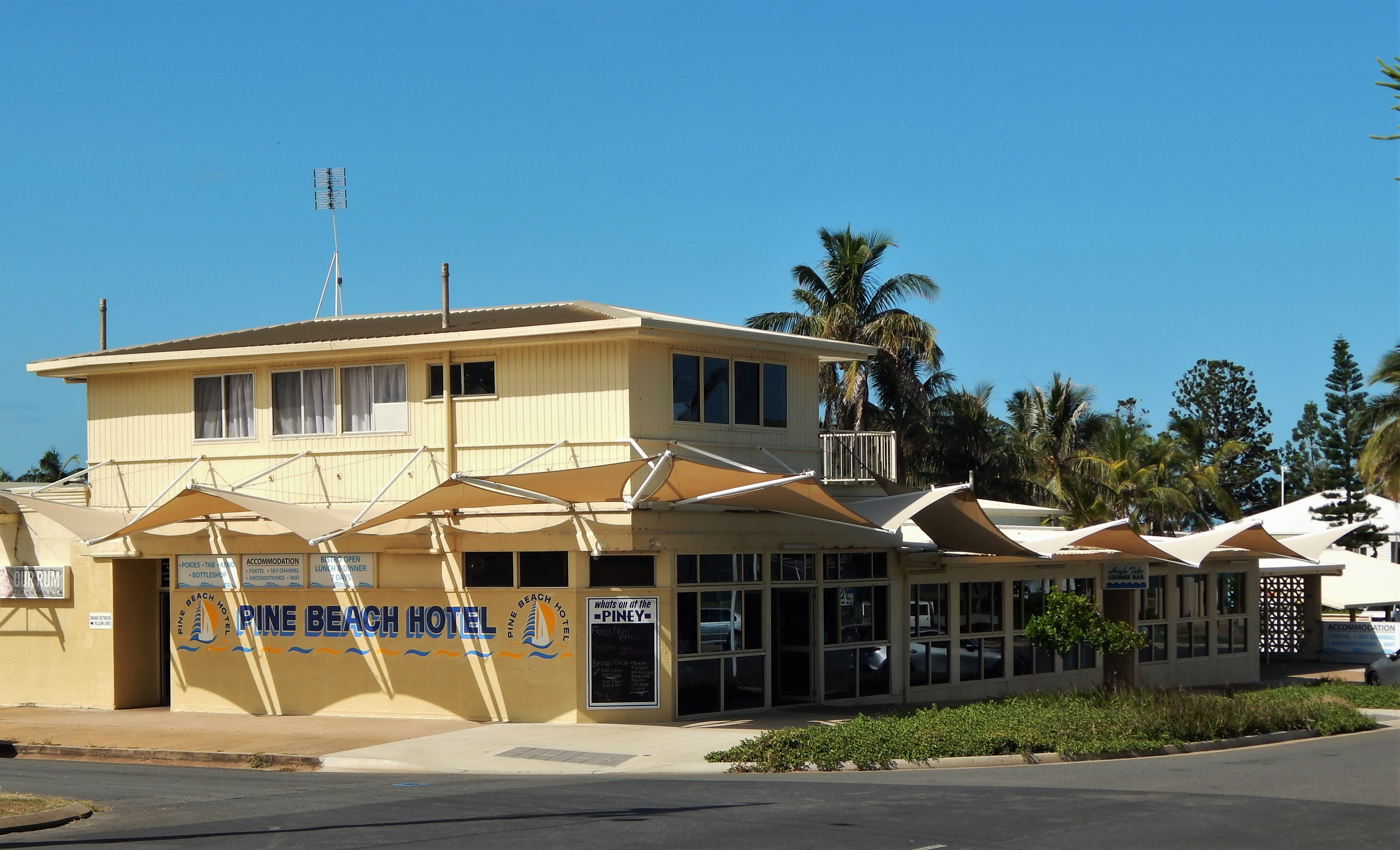
Pine Beach Hotel, 2022

The first hotel to be opened in Emu Park was The Brighton. It was built in 1871 and run by Eliza Pearson who was granted the license on 12 December 1871. After being refurbished, it was re-opened by Ferguson McHarg as the Blue Bell Hotel in November 1879. It was demolished and rebuilt in 1888 when it was re-opened by George Birch as the Grand Hotel in 1888. The Grand Hotel was destroyed in a fire on 20 November 1908 which killed district schools inspector Thomas Russell Brown. Rockhampton mayor Harry Medcraf who was also staying at the hotel managed to escape the fire. A palatial house was then built on the site and purchased by the Begg family who converted it into the Pine Beach Hotel which opened on 13 March 1926. The Pine Beach Hotel continues to trade from the site on the corner of Pattison Street and Granville Street.

The Emu Park Hotel became the town's second hotel in 1874 when Philip Downer was granted the license on 11 December 1874. After Fred Comley purchased the hotel in 1885, a hall was constructed next to the hotel which was opened on 8 March 1889. Prior to the school building being finished in Fountain Street, Emu Park State School was originally opened in the hall on 3 February 1890 with Benjamin Long becoming the school's first head teacher. When the school was destroyed in a fire on 26 July 1946, school students once again returned to Comley's Hall until the new school buildings were opened in 1948. After being renovated, the Emu Park Hotel was renamed Hotel Riviera in October 1927. The hall was destroyed in the Central Queensland cyclone on 2 March 1949 when it collapsed against the side of the hotel, which also sustained considerable damage. Later that same year, the hotel was destroyed in a fire on 27 September 1949.

In the late 1880s, the Imperial Hotel was built in Hill Street. The proposal for a third hotel in Emu Park was met with opposition from the existing licensees as they believed the community was not yet big enough to sustain three hotels. In July 1888, George Wickham applied for the hotel license but was refused. Several months later, William Toon managed to successfully apply for the license to run the Imperial Hotel and the business was opened soon after. The hotel was bought by the Begg family in 1911. The Imperial Hotel was destroyed by fire on 7 April 1925. A movie theatre was built on the site in 1950 which was bought by the Green family in 1969 who transformed the building into a hardware store. The building was demolished in 1992 to make way for a row of new retail outlets.

The Railway Hotel was opened by the Evans family in 1890. It was destroyed by fire on 19 June 1904. A boarding house was then built on the site which was purchased by the Begg family in 1912. The Begg's relocated the Mount Usher Hotel from near Mount Morgan to Emu Park and rebuilt it as the Grand Central Hotel which opened on 22 March 1913. The Begg family remained as licensees until 1926 when they leased it out before returning in 1945. There was a series of ownership changes before the licensing commission cancelled the hotel's license, after which it became a boarding house known as The Beachcomber. After the closure of the railway, The Beachcomber was sold but then remained vacant until it was demolished in 1977. In May 1987, the site was bought at auction and construction of a new building began on 7 September 1987. The Endeavour Inn was opened on the site by Denis Hinton on 26 February 1988 which continues to operate from the site.

=== School of Arts ===
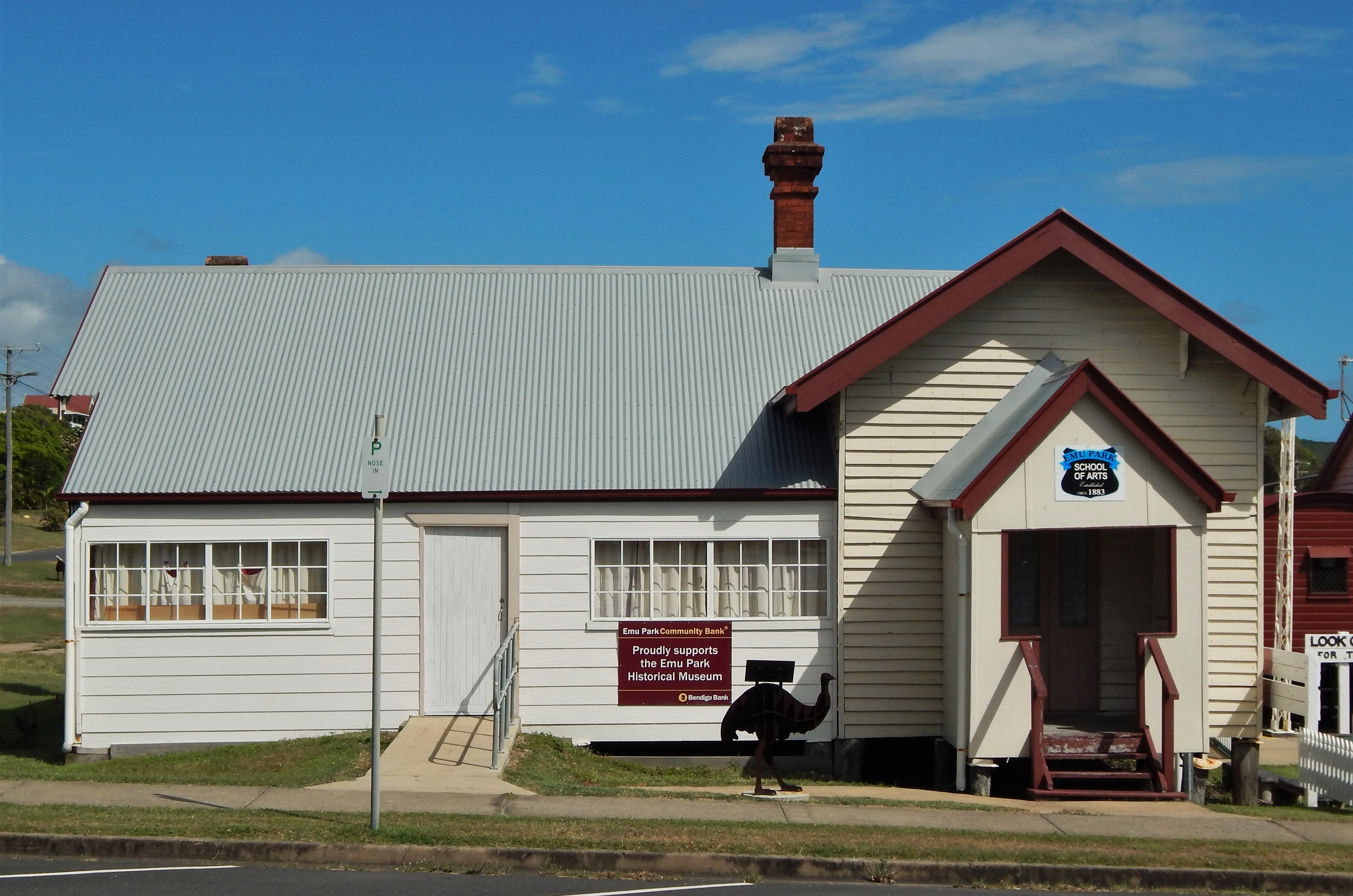
School of Arts, 2022

The building now known as the School of Arts was the town's first post and telegraph office which was built and opened in November 1883. Shortly after opening, the post office was relocated to the Emu Park Railway Station and the building became the School of Arts. Emu Park's first library was opened in the School of Arts in 1902 with Rose McLelland becoming the town's first librarian. Another librarian, Mary Morris, was credited with having a dance hall built on land beside the School of Arts in 1921 but it was destroyed in a fire on 27 December 1945. The current Emu Park Library opened in 1984 after the School of Arts became a medical centre in 1983, before eventually being donated to the Emu Park Museum in 2007.

=== Post office ===
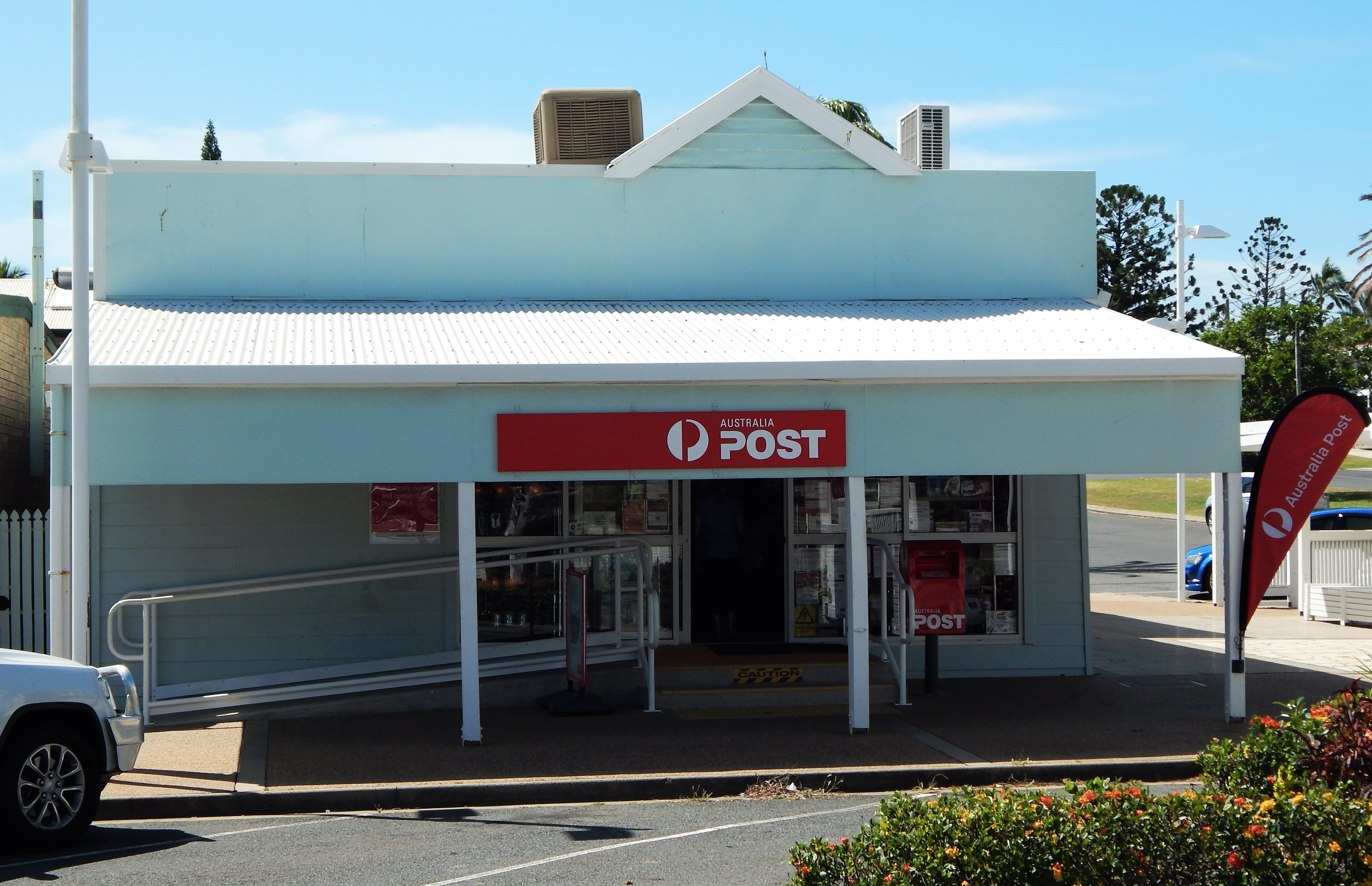
Emu Park post office, 2022

The Emu Park Post Office was eventually relocated from the railway station to Pattison Street where the Edmistone family ran it for 65 years. It was eventually relocated again to the Emu Park Arcade in Granville Street and taken over by Kerry Kay in 1997 who ran it until his retirement in 2021. The Emu Park Post Office was relocated again to its existing location in the former general store on the corner of Hill Street and Pattison Street in April 2018.

=== Community Arts Centre ===
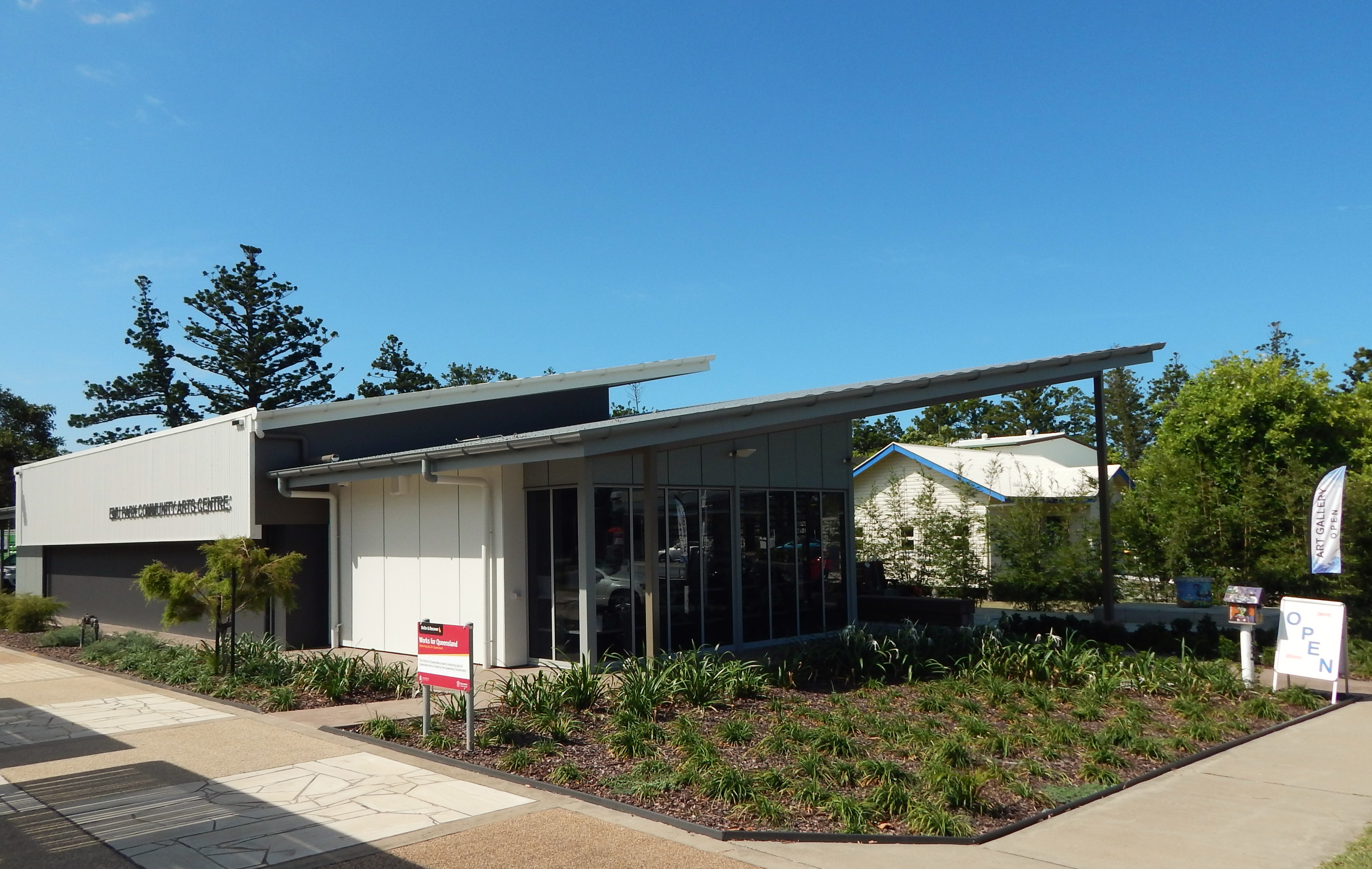
Community Arts Centre, 2022

The Emu Park Community Arts Centre was officially opened on 9 December 2021, with the first exhibition in the venue being held on 11 December 2021. Livingstone Shire Council obtained $1.1 million from the state government for the project with the council also allocating $200,000 to the facility. The new arts centre was built where the railway station once stood, after the former art gallery was closed in 2019 when the building it had been situated in for 15 years was sold.

== Demographics ==
Some of the descendants of the Woppaburra people evicted from their homeland in the Greater and South Keppel islands live in both Emu Park and Yeppoon.

In the 2011 census, the locality of Emu Park had a population of 2,021 people.

In the 2016 census, the locality of Emu Park had a population of 2,130 people.

In the 2021 census, the locality of Emu Park had a population of 2,281 people.

== Heritage listings ==
Emu Park has a number of heritage-listed sites, including:

- Bell Park, Hill Street (23.2559°S 150.8273°E)

== Education ==
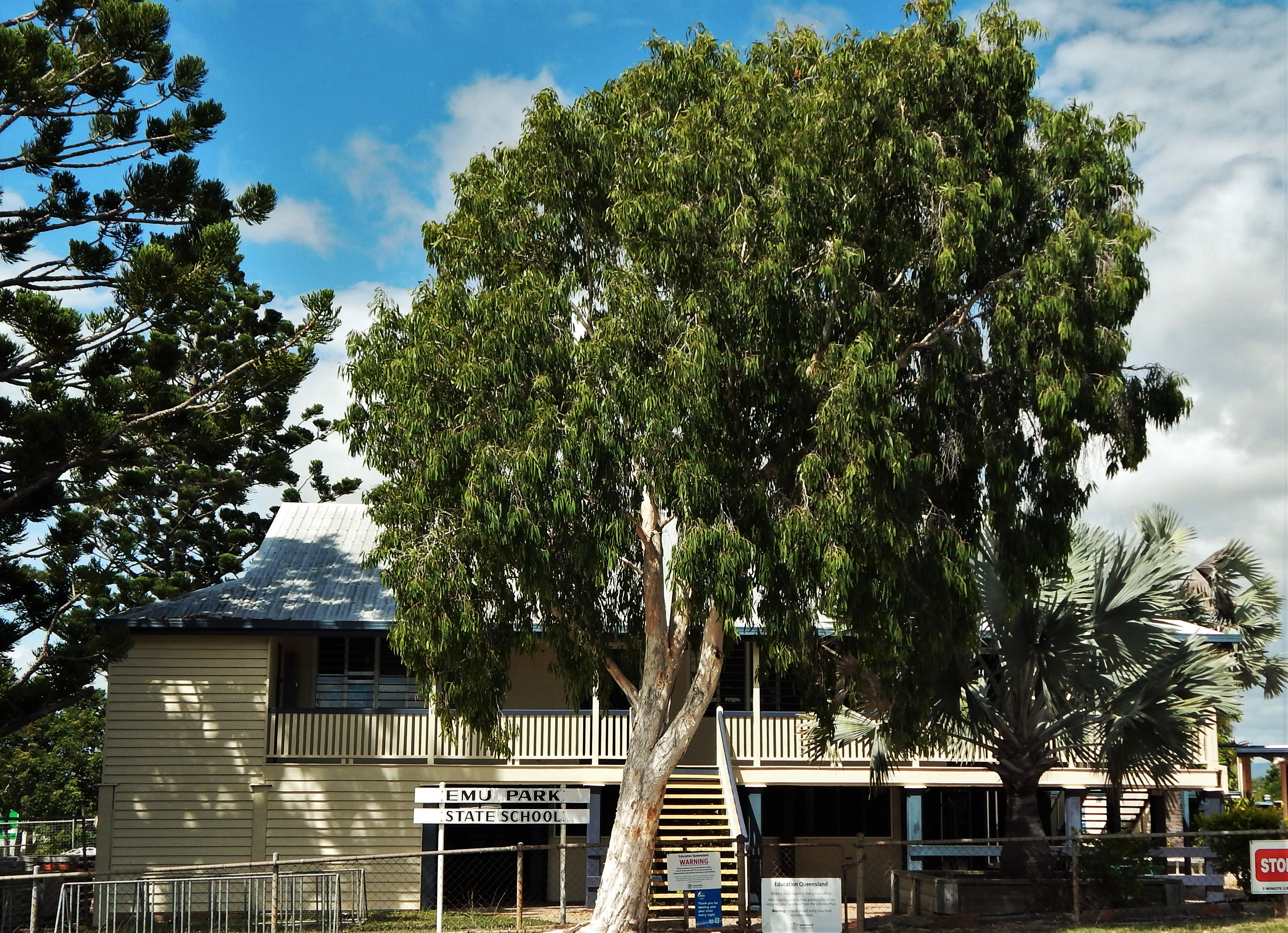
Emu Park State School, 2022

Emu Park State School is a government primary (Prep–6) school for boys and girls at 26 Fountain Street (23.2597°S 150.8207°E). In 2018, the school had an enrolment of 507 students with 37 teachers (33 full-time equivalent) and 25 non-teaching staff (17 full-time equivalent). It includes a special education program.

There are no secondary schools in Emu Park, despite lobbying and support from the local community to have a high school established in the town, which has at times become a contentious political issue. The nearest government secondary school is Yeppoon State High School in Yeppoon to the north.

== Facilities ==
Emu Park has facilities for a range of emergency services:

- Emu Park Police Station, 46 Pattison Street (23.2564°S 150.8252°E)
- Emu Park Ambulance Station, at 87 Hartley Street (23.2665°S 150.8202°E)
- Emu Park Fire Station, at 55 Conner Street (23.2669°S 150.8203°E)
- Emu Park SES Facility, at 53 Archer Street (23.2561°S 150.8246°E)

Emu Park Cemetery is on Emu Park Road (23.2608°S 150.8014°E).

Emu Park-Zilzie Sewage Treatment Plant is at 3620 Emu Park Road (23.2627°S 150.8103°E).

== Amenities ==
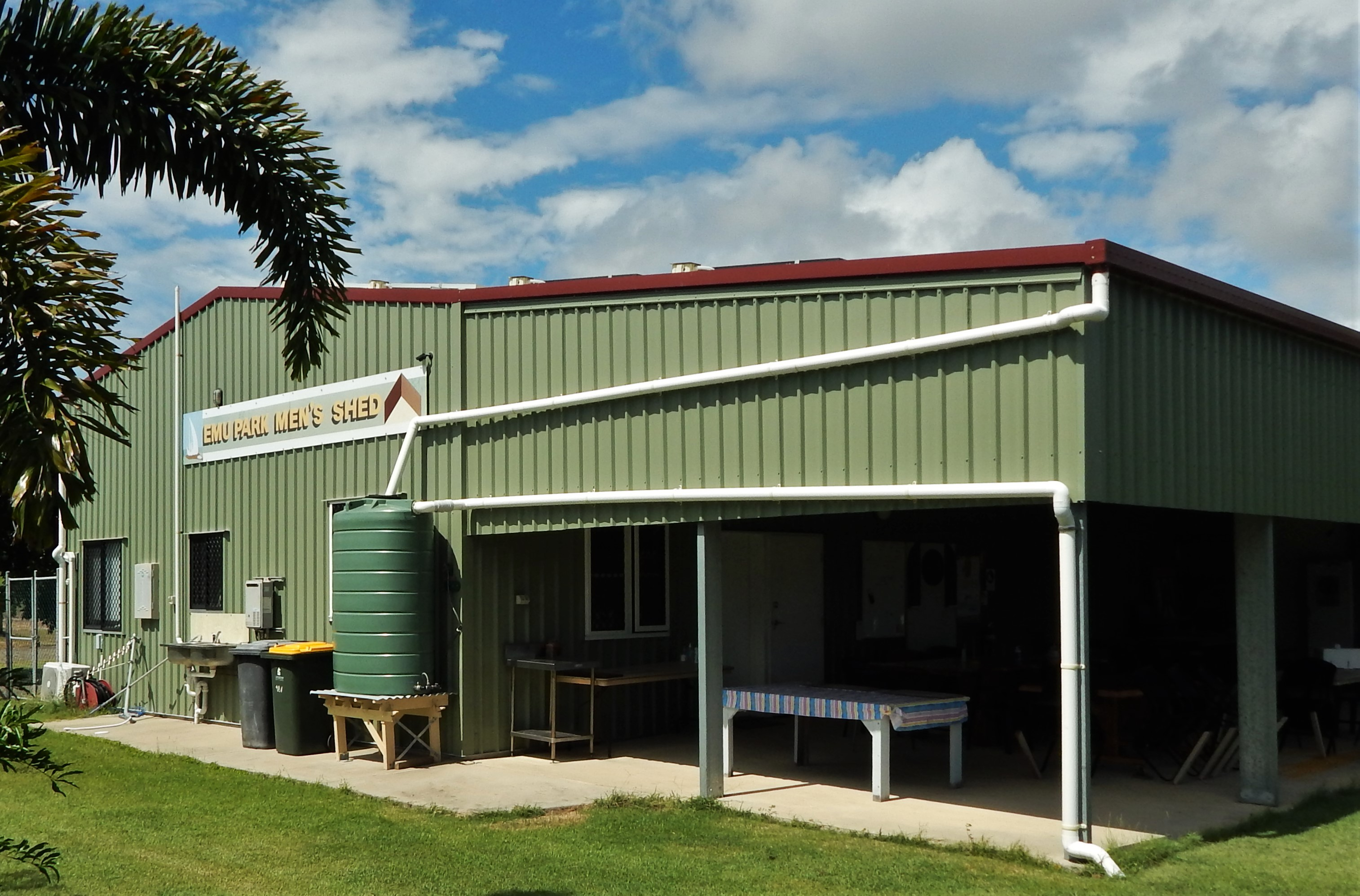
Emu Park Men's Shed, 2022

Livingstone Shire Council operates the Emu Park library (23.2564°S 150.8270°E) and Emu Park Cultural Hall (23.2565°S 150.8269°E) at 7-9 Hill Street.

The Emu Park branch of the Queensland Country Women's Association meets at CWA Hall at 11 Hill Street (23.2566°S 150.8266°E).

Churches in Emu Park include:

- Emu Park Uniting Church, 22 Archer Street (23.2584°S 150.8257°E).
- Mary Immaculate Catholic Church, 38 Archer Street (23.2572°S 150.8247°E)
- Christ Church Anglican, 9 Hunter Street (23.2560°S 150.8237°E)

There is a boat ramp at the eastern end of Hill Street at Emu Point (23.2550°S 150.8286°E). It is managed by the Livingstone Shire Council.

Following the establishment of a local Emu Park & District Men's Shed Association, a purpose-built men's shed was constructed on Hartley Street (23.26105°S 150.81952°E) which was officially opened in 2016.

== Sport ==
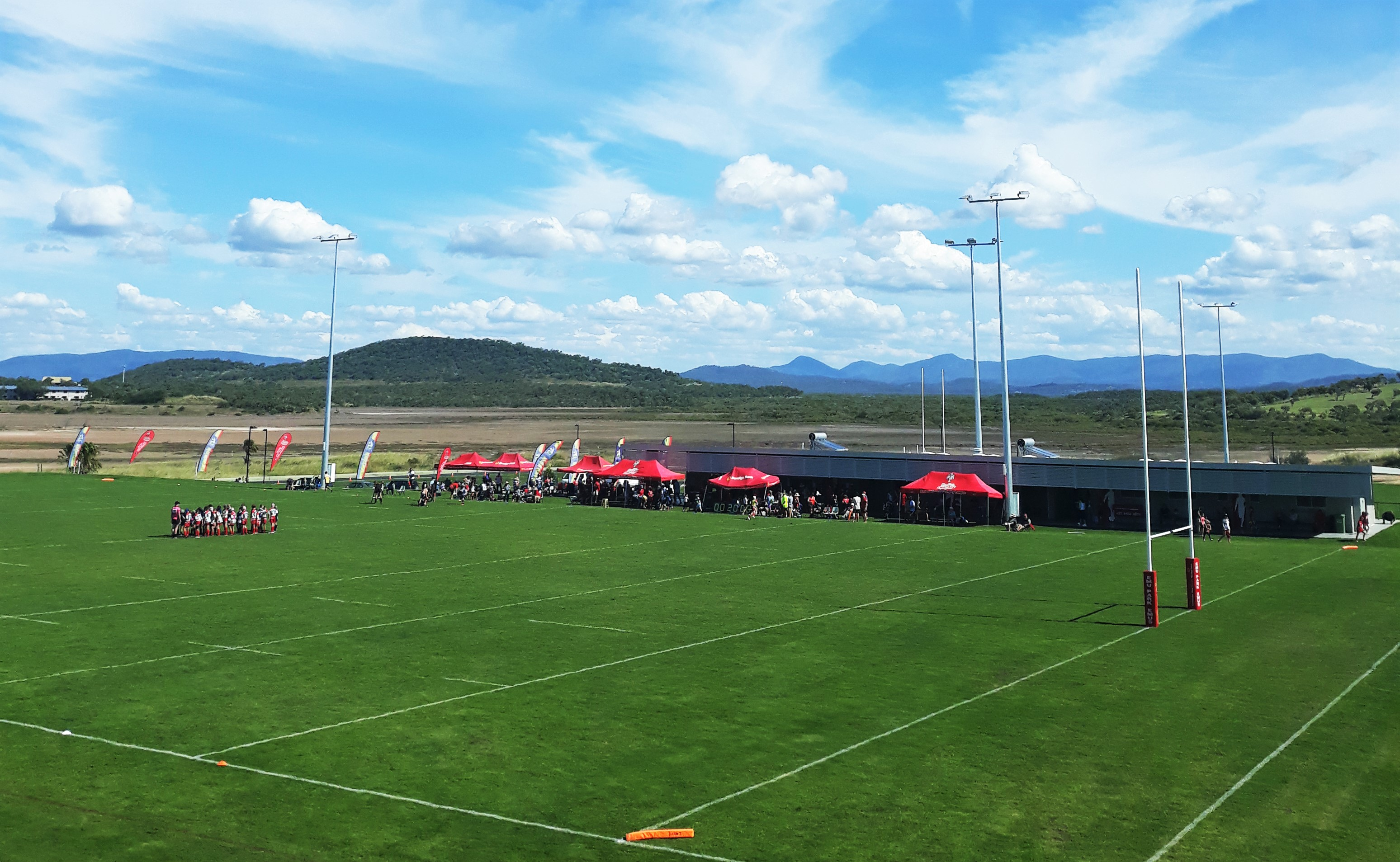
Opening day of Emu Park's new multi-sports facility, 2018

A variety of local sporting organisations can be found within Emu Park, incorporating sports such as rugby league, rugby union, touch football, lawn bowls, croquet, swimming, surf lifesaving, fishing and golf. A $5 million multi-sports facility on Hartley St, jointly funded by the Australian Government, Queensland Government, Livingstone Shire Council and Bendigo Community Bank was officially opened on 19 May 2018, with future plans to expand facilities.

Emu Park Golf Course is a community club (23.2610°S 150.8076°E).

In 2014, it was announced that Emu Park would be permitted to enter a team into Rockhampton Senior Rugby League's A-grade, reserve and Under 20's competitions for the 2015 season. Home games will be played at the Emu Park Sports Facility on Hartley Street in Emu Park. The club competes in the Rockhampton District Rugby League competition.

== Events ==
Emu Park hosts a variety of annual community events including:

- Festival of the Wind kite festival
- Classics By The Coast vintage car show
- Emu Park Lions Club Oktoberfest (now running over 30 years)

The town's popular market days are held on the third Sunday of each month in Bell Park.

In 2021 Woodford Folk Festival chose Emu Park Cultural Hall as a venue for their travelling Festival of Small Halls tours of regional Queensland.

== Geology and environment ==
=== Native flora ===
Emu Park is home to many types of remnant native vegetation types including heathland, grassland, dune, eucalypt woodland, mangroves, alluvial wetlands, coastal casuarina and acacia woodland, and semi-evergreen vine thickets and notophyll vine forests. Both semi-evergreen vine thickets and notophyll vine forests vegetation types are Of Concern under the Queensland Vegetation Management Act 1999 and also have a biodiversity status of Of concern under the same law. In both vegetation types, Araucaria cunninghamii is the dominant tree species. Remnants of these ecosystems can be seen behind Bell Park, between Fisherman's Lane and Golding Street, steep areas along Haven Beach, the Cocoanut Point section of Capricorn Coast National Park, and along the beach behind the resort located in the suburb of Zilzie, Queensland.

=== Native fauna ===
Although once common in the area, the local Emu population has been declining due to disturbance, land use change, and increased land development. Emu's can occasionally be seen in area's such as Hartley Park in the alluvial tidal wetland and in the Zilzie, Queensland Area. Many foot prints can be seen in this area.

== Attractions ==
Attractions in Emu Park include:

- the Singing Ship memorial
- the Centenary of ANZAC memorial
- Main Beach recreational area
- Lions Club heritage trail
- Hartley Park

=== Singing Ship memorial ===
The Singing Ship memorial is located on the headland accessed from Tennant Memorial Drive (23.2562°S 150.8291°E). It commemorates the voyage of James Cook on the HM Bark Endeavour in May 1770 during which he explored the bay. The memorial depicts the sail, mast and rigging of the ship, and the "singing" is created by the wind passing through organ pipes within the memorial.

=== Centenary of ANZAC memorial ===
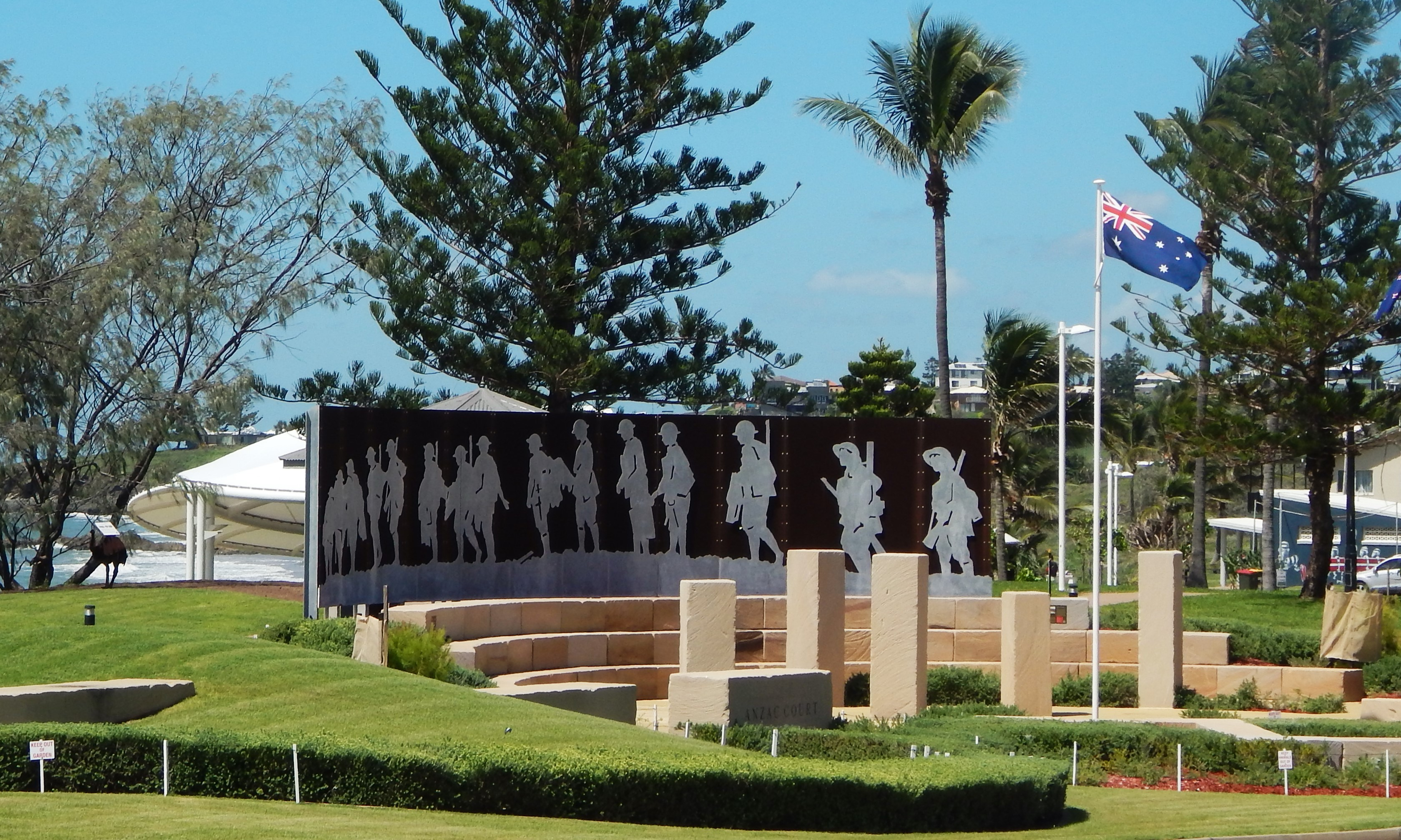
Anzac Memorial, 2020

A Centenary of ANZAC memorial is located along the beachfront at the southern end of Emu Street, opposite the Emu Park RSL Sub-Branch (23.2582°S 150.8289°E).

Since the first stage of the multi-faceted development opened in 2015, the memorial has become a landmark of cultural and historic significance for Central Queensland, while also serving as a tourist attraction for Emu Park itself. The memorial consists of several elements including ANZAC Court featuring a sandstone and sculpture cenotaph, a glass pane artwork, various sandstone plinths, The Gatehouse museum, battle markers, silhouettes of Australian soldiers, a boardwalk and a viewing platform.

In 2011, local artist and Vietnam veteran Ross Coulter proposed part of the Emu Park foreshore be developed to incorporate a commemorative Centenary of ANZAC memorial. Coulter's vision was for a new memorial called Anzac Plaza to be established, to complement the existing RSL precinct where the RSL Memorial Hall had been officially opened in 1949.

However, Coulter died on 5 November 2011, the same day the plans were publicly announced. Despite his death, the RSL vowed to progress with Coulter's vision to have a Centenary of ANZAC Memorial established in Emu Park.

A steering committee was formed in 2013 to move forward with the development which Livingstone Shire Council adopted in 2014, launching the project in partnership with the state government, Emu Park RSL, Bendigo Community Bank and Home Corp.

A symbolic groundbreaking ceremony was held in July 2014, with Coulter's widow Kate Coulter in attendance along with various dignitaries. The first sandstone blocks of the ANZAC Court memorial feature were installed in December 2014, with the first stage of the memorial completed and commissioned in time for Anzac Day commemorations in 2015.

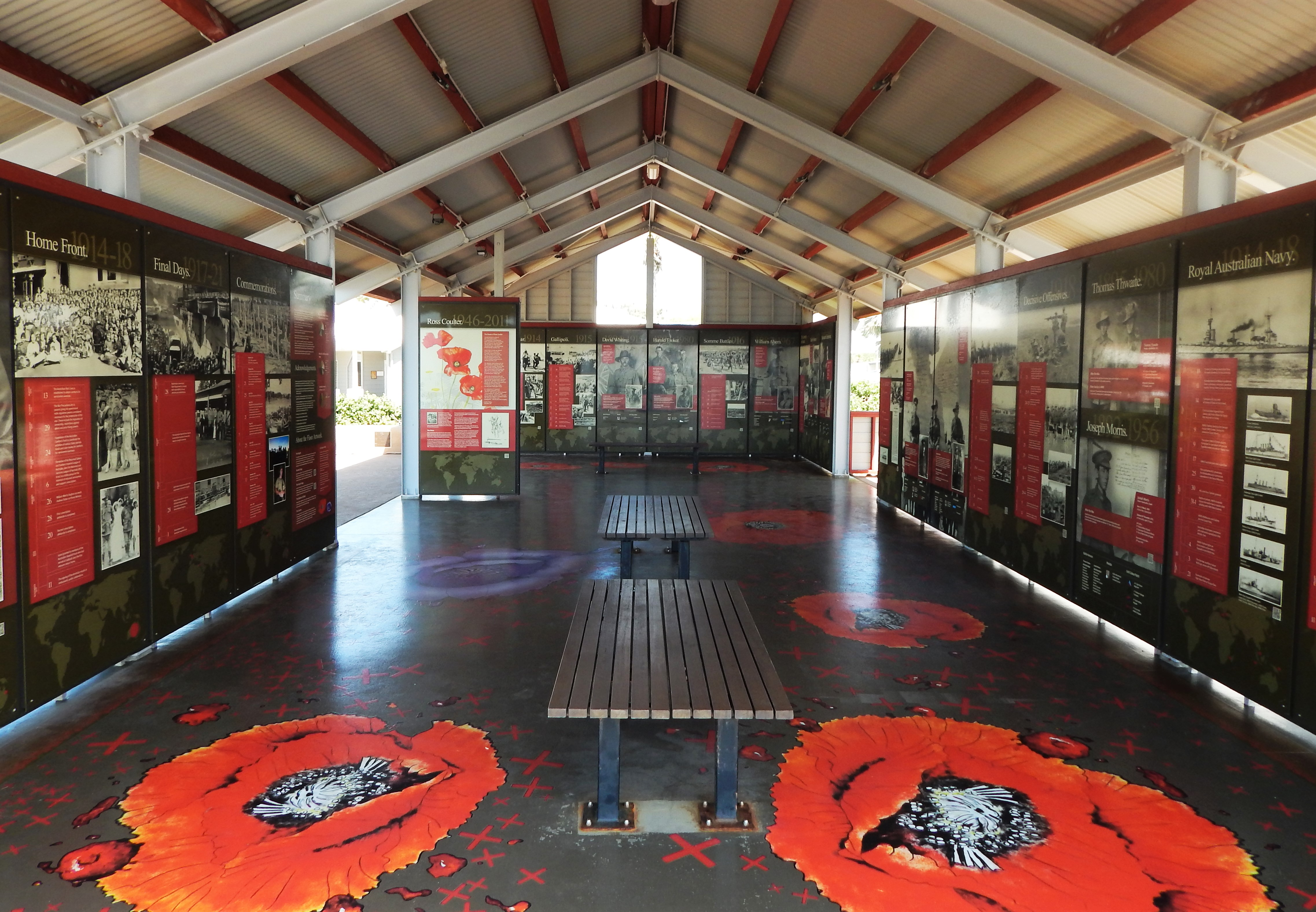
The Gatehouse, 2020

Prior to the 2016 Anzac Day commemorations, more than 200 people attended the official opening of The Gatehouse - a structure that houses 26 separate information panels telling the stories of local men and women from Emu Park who served during the World War I, as well as general information about the war. Later that year, three sandstone plinths were unveiled at the memorial to acknowledge the history of the RSL.

In 2017, more elements to the memorial were added including groups of silhouetted figures representing Australian soldiers, and more than forty battle markers.

Since it opened, the Centenary of ANZAC Memorial Precinct has been used for annual Anzac Day and Remembrance Day services, with more than 5000 people attending the dawn service on 25 April 2018. The landmark is popular with visitors to the town and many community groups often attend the memorial for educational purposes.

Queensland country musician Tony Cook filmed parts of the music video for his single "Country Recognised" at the memorial.

=== Main Beach foreshore ===
In 2016, it was announced the Emu Park foreshore at Main Beach would be extensively redeveloped in three stages of the Emu Park Village and Foreshore Revitalisation.

Works on the $4.62m project began in 2017 which included upgrading the Main Beach and surf club carparks, installing new barbeques, electrical works, street beautification, replacing the QCWA rotunda, and new play equipment.

Five colourful emu statues designed by local artist Bill Gannon were unveiled on 7 April 2021. However, soon after the statues were installed there were damaged in an act of vandalism which was described by Livingstone mayor Andy Ireland as "disgraceful".

=== Heritage trail ===
In 2019, a 2.5 kilometre heritage trail incorporating 20 separate historical locations was established in the town with steel emu sculptures identifying the sites with information boards which include QR codes linked to the trail's website.

The trail was jointly funded by the Lions Club of Emu Park, Livingstone Shire Council and the Australian Government.
