= List of Rockhampton suburbs =

Suburbs and localities in Rockhampton Region, Queensland, Australia

This is a list of the suburbs and localities of Rockhampton, Queensland, Australia. The Rockhampton Region includes both urban and rural localities governed by the Rockhampton Regional Council. Population figures are based on the 2021 Census conducted by the Australian Bureau of Statistics.

Suburb/locality	Location (approx. distance from CBD)	2021 Census population	Notes
Allenstown	3 km south-west	2,986	
Alton Downs	10 km west	1,267	
Berserker	6 km north-east	7,144	Named after the Berserker Range, inspired by Norse mythology by the Archer brothers who settled the area.
Depot Hill	1 km south	1,065	
Fairy Bower	5 km south-west	120	
Frenchville	7 km north-east	9,193	Named for botanist Anthelme Thozet, an early Rockhampton pioneer.
Kawana	8 km west	4,640	
Koongal	5 km east	4,705	
Lakes Creek	8 km east	334	
Norman Gardens	7 km north	8,460	
Park Avenue	4 km north	5,379	
Parkhurst	9 km north	2,580	
Port Curtis	3 km south	323	
Rockhampton City	Central Business District	2,251	The administrative and commercial centre of the Rockhampton Region.
The Range	3 km west	5,410	Includes the Rockhampton Botanic Gardens and Zoo.
Wandal	4 km north-west	4,250	Developed from large estates in the late 19th century.
West Rockhampton	6 km west	1,835	Contains Rockhampton Airport and the Rockhampton Base Hospital.
