= Port Curtis, Queensland =

Port Curtis
- Suburb
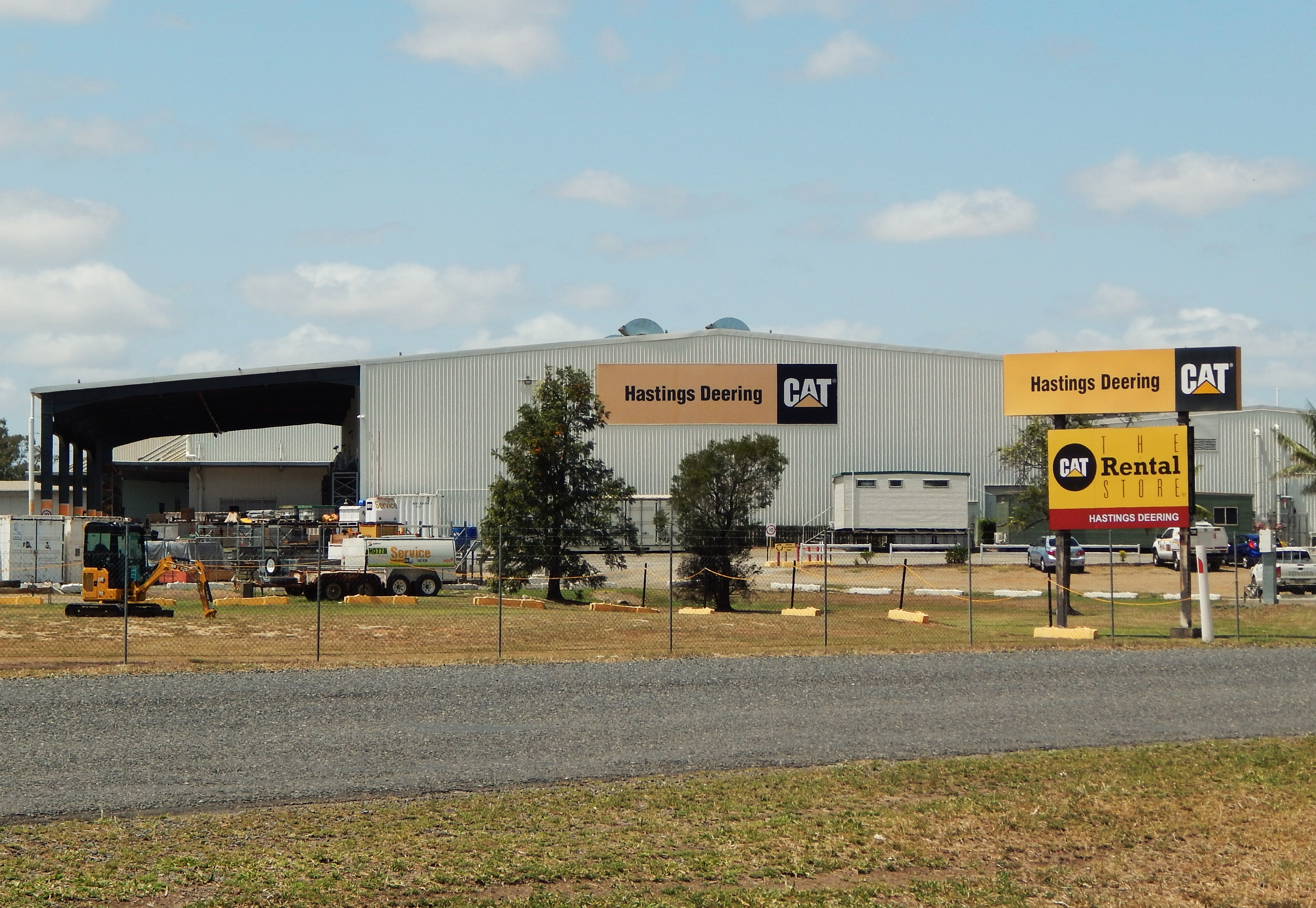
- Hastings Deering at Port Curtis, 2021

- Interactive map of Port Curtis
- Coordinates: 23.4197°S 150.5405°E
- Country: Australia
- State: Queensland
- City: Rockhampton
- LGA: Rockhampton Region
- Location: 4.2 km (2.6 mi) S of Rockhampton CBD; 627 km (390 mi) NNW of Brisbane

Government
  - State electorates: Mirani; Rockhampton
  - Federal divisions: Flynn; Capricornia

Area
  - Total: 45.9 km^{2} (17.7 sq mi)

Population
  - Total: 309 (2021 census)
  - Density: 6.732/km^{2} (17.44/sq mi)
- Time zone: UTC+10:00 (AEST)
- Postcode: 4700
Suburbs around Port Curtis
Depot Hill	The Common	Koongal
Fairy Bower; Allenstown	Port Curtis	Lakes Creek
Bouldercombe; Gracemere	Midgee	Nerimbera

Port Curtis is a suburb of Rockhampton in the Rockhampton Region, Queensland, Australia. In the 2021 census, Port Curtis had a population of 309 people.

== Geography ==
The Fitzroy River bounds the suburb to the north-east. Gavial Creek, a tributary of the Fitzroy River, flows through the locality with their confluence at the north of the suburb. The land is flat and low-lying (less than 10 metres above sea level).

The North Coast railway line passes along the western edge of the locality with the junction with the Central Western railway line at Rocklands railway station (23.4364°S 150.5203°E) within Port Curtis.

As at January 2021, very little of the land has been developed with only a few small pockets of residential and industrial use.

== History ==
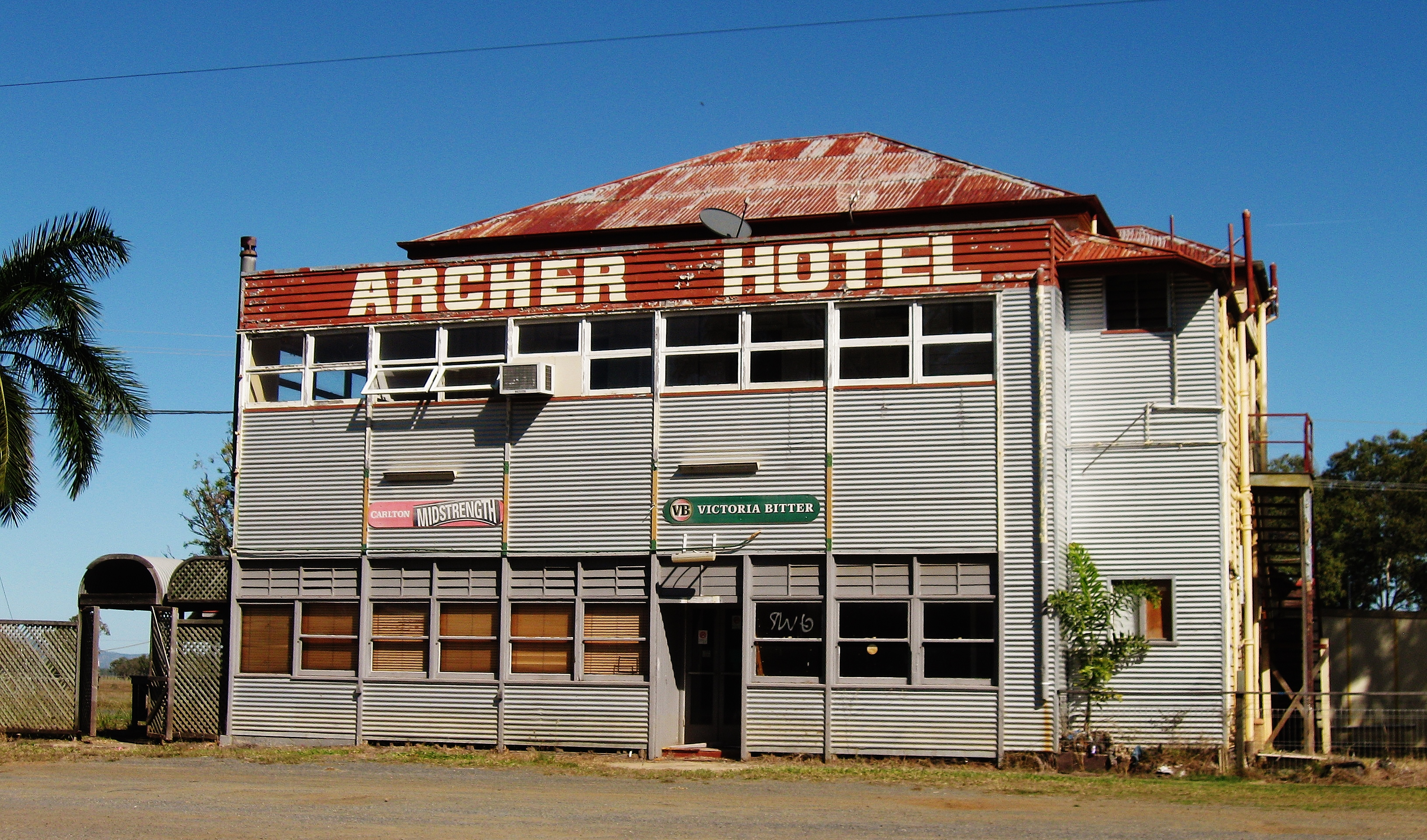
Archer Hotel at Port Curtis, 2012

Port Curtis Road State School opened on 23 March 1875.

In 1912, a Baptist church opened in Port Curtis Road close to the state school. It was a "rapid erection" with construction of pre-fabricated sections commencing at 3pm to be completed in time for an official opening service at around 6pm on Saturday 30 November 1912.

Apart from some land south of Baxter Street, Port Curtis was completely flooded by the Fitzroy River in early January 2011.

The Archer Hotel, formerly the Balmoral Hotel, was located at Port Curtis until a fire completely destroyed the pub on 1 January 2018. Built in the late 1800s, the hotel had been closed for four years before the fire. In 1983, a Ford Telstar sedan belonging to suspected murder victim Bradley Kerrisk was recovered from the Balmoral Hotel at Port Curtis after he went missing, having been last seen at Callaghan Park on 24 June 1983. A $250,000 reward is still on offer for information leading to the conviction of those responsible for Kerrisk's disappearance and suspected murder.

The Rockhampton site of mining and industrial equipment supplier Hastings Deering, one of Rockhampton's major employers, is located at Port Curtis.

== Demographics ==
In the 2016 census, Port Curtis had a population of 281 people.

In the 2021 census, Port Curtis had a population of 309 people.

== Education ==
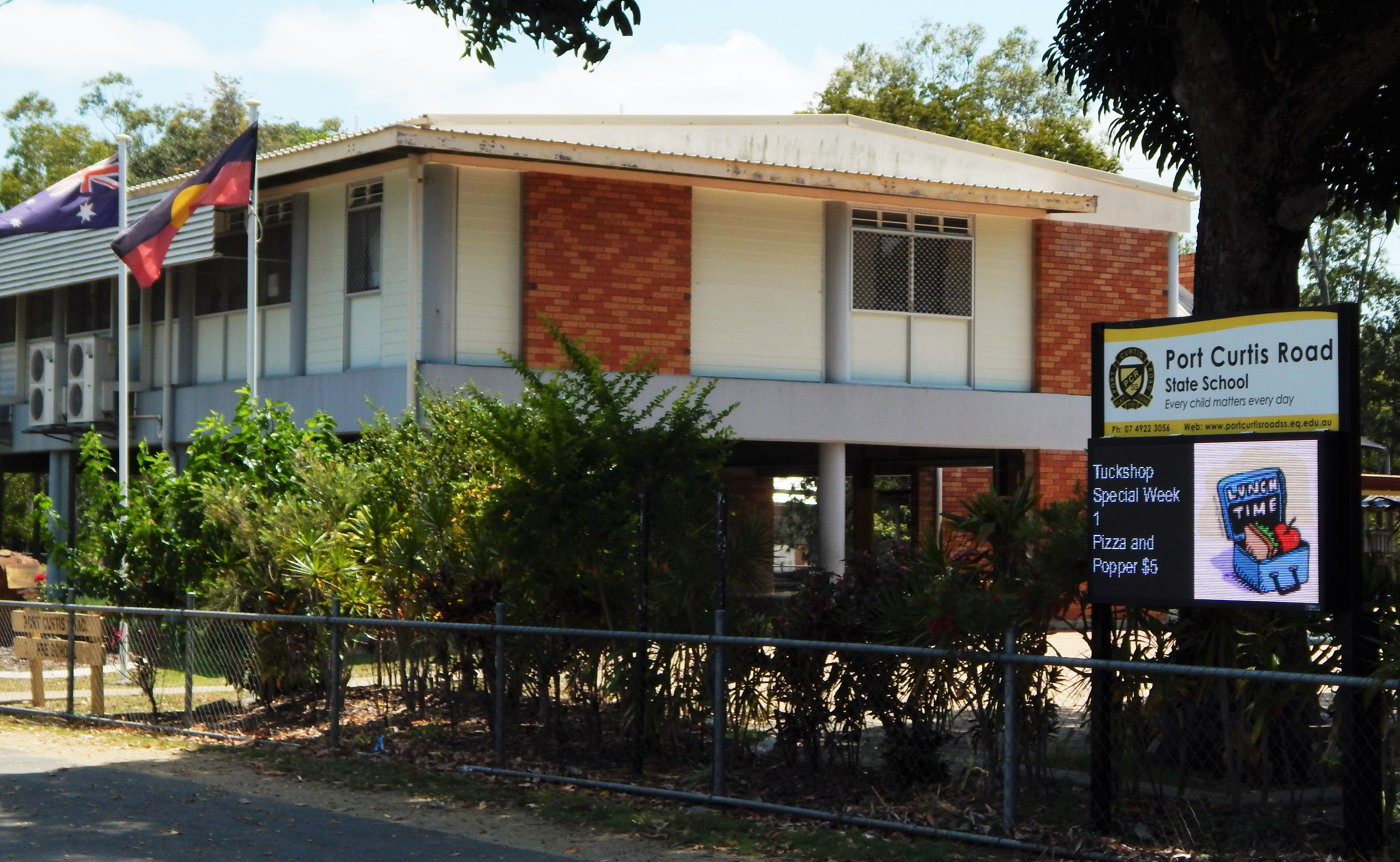
Port Curtis Road State School, 2021

Port Curtis Road State School is a government primary (Prep–6) school for boys and girls at Port Curtis Road (23.4134°S 150.5140°E).

In 2016, the school had an enrolment of 54 students with 5 teachers (4 full-time equivalent) and 6 non-teaching staff (4 full-time equivalent). In 2018, the school had an enrolment of 67 students with 5 teachers (4 full-time equivalent) and 7 non-teaching staff (4 full-time equivalent).

There are no secondary schools in Port Curtis. The nearest government secondary school is Rockhampton State High School in Wandal to the north.

== Attractions ==
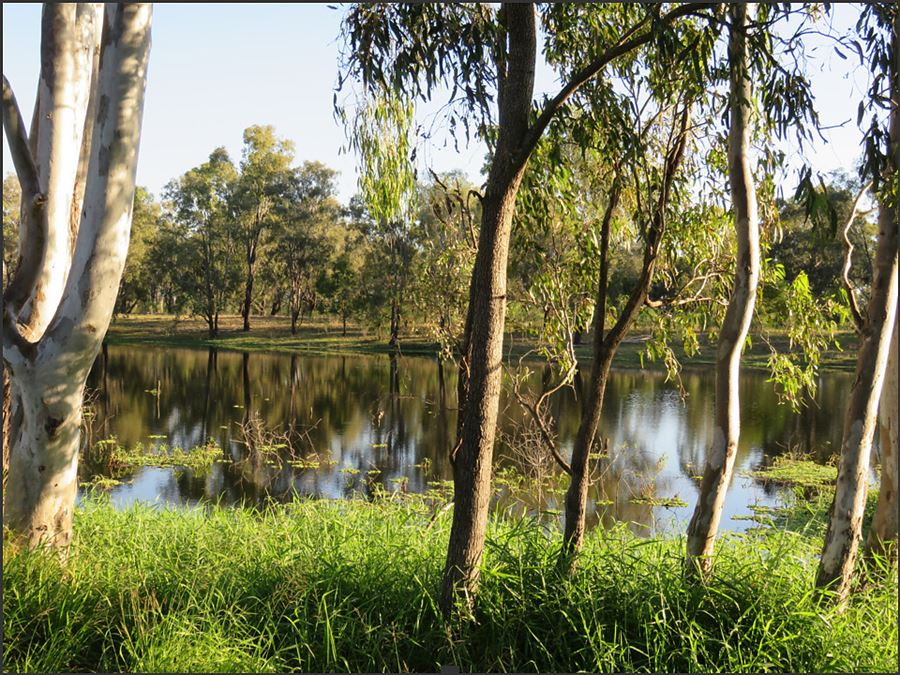
Billabong near the old Tropic of Capricorn marker, Port Curtis road, 2022

A pair of Tropic of Capricorn markers can be found beside the billabong on Port Curtis Road (23.4380°S 150.5338°E).
