= Fairy Bower, Queensland =

Suburb of Rockhampton, Queensland, Australia

Fairy Bower
- Suburb
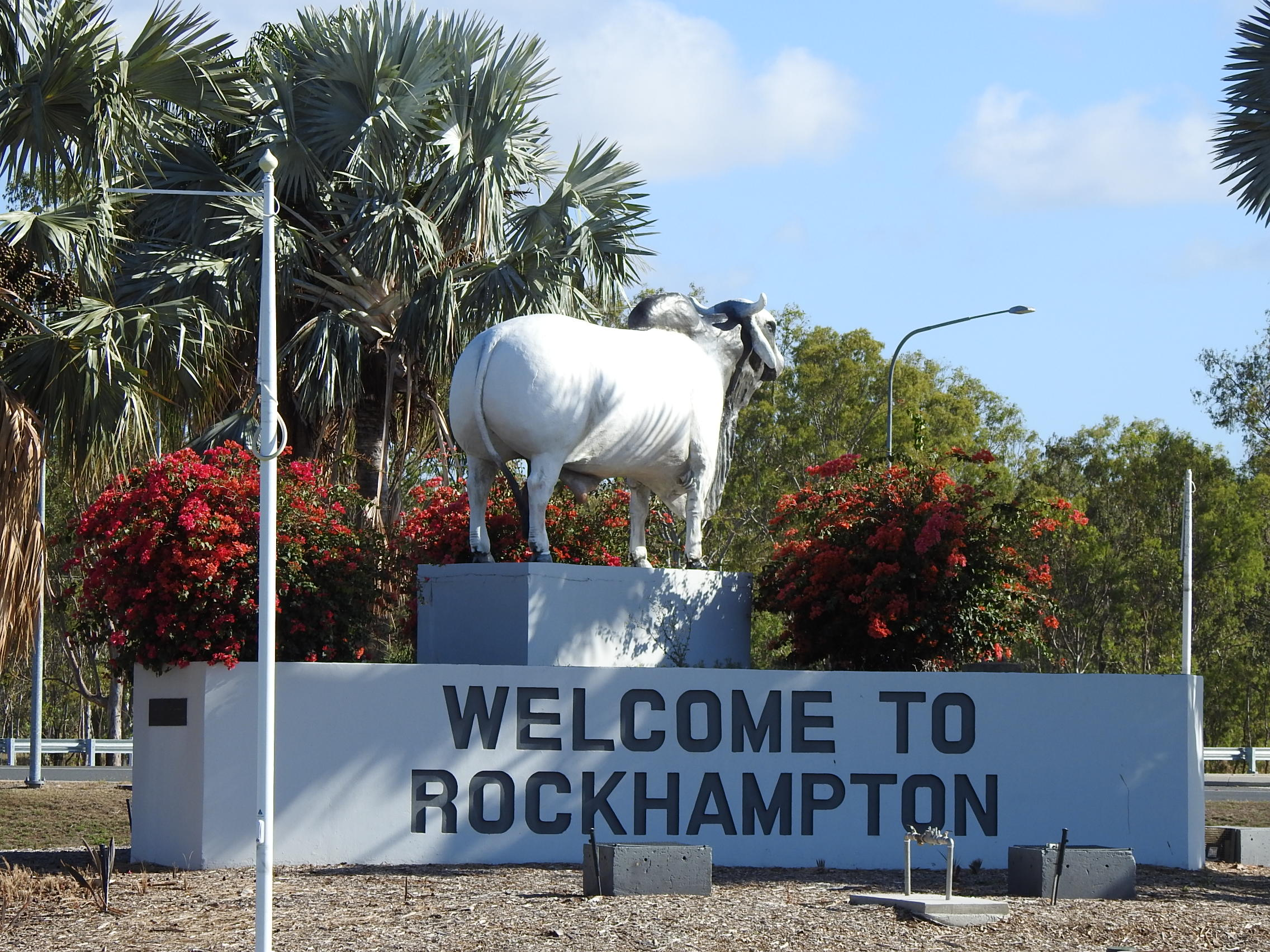
- The Brahman Big Bull welcomes people to Rockhampton at the Yeppen roundabout, 2019

- Interactive map of Fairy Bower
- Coordinates: 23.4047°S 150.4647°E
- Country: Australia
- State: Queensland
- City: Rockhampton
- LGA: Rockhampton Region
- Location: 8.4 km (5.2 mi) SW of Rockhampton CBD; 665 km (413 mi) NNW of Brisbane

Government
  - State electorate: Rockhampton
  - Federal division: Capricornia

Area
  - Total: 24.6 km^{2} (9.5 sq mi)

Population
  - Total: 99 (2021 census)
  - Density: 4.024/km^{2} (10.42/sq mi)
- Time zone: UTC+10:00 (AEST)
- Postcode: 4700
Suburbs around Fairy Bower
Pink Lily	West Rockhampton	The Range
Nine Mile	Fairy Bower	Allenstown
Gracemere	Gracemere	Port Curtis

Fairy Bower is an outer suburb of Rockhampton in the Rockhampton Region, Queensland, Australia. In the 2021 census, Fairy Bower had a population of 99 people.

== Geography ==
The Bruce Highway is the eastern boundary of the locality with the North Coast railway line immediately parallel to the east of the highway; however, there is no railway station in the suburb but Yeppen railway station is just north of the suburb in Allenstown/Port Curtis. The Capricorn Highway enters the suburb from the south and joins the Bruce Highway at a large roundabout on the north-east corner of the suburb and then proceed north into Allenstown. The proposed Rockhampton Ring Road will have its south-western entry on the Capricorn Highway in Fairy Bower.

Neerkol Creek is the south-western boundary of the suburb.

Fairy Bower is low-lying land, less than 10 metres above sea level, and contains a number of lagoons, including the Yeppen Yeppen Lagoon, the Crescent Lagoon, Nelson Lagoon and Deadmans Lagoon.

Despite its official designation as a suburb, as at 2024, the land use remains rural in character, being predominantly grazing on native vegetation with some crop growing and some rural residential housing.

== History ==
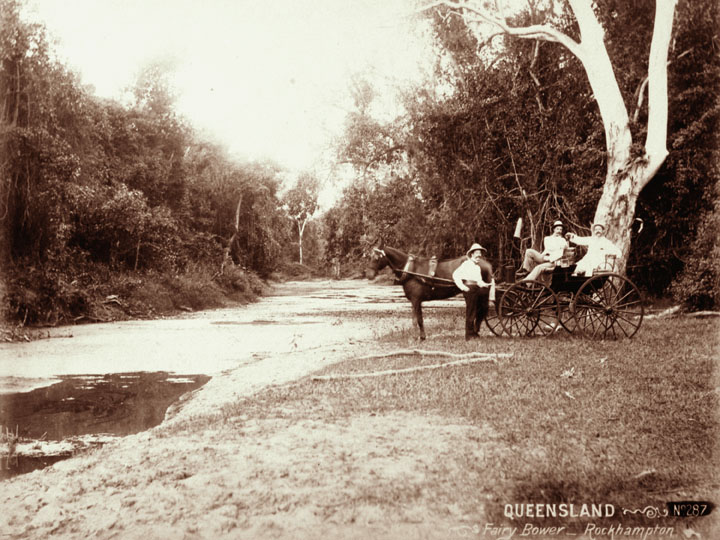
Three men and a buggy at Fairy Bower, circa 1897

A duplication project at Fairy Bower between 2019 and 2021 saw the Capricorn Highway between Gracemere and Rockhampton widened to a four lane separated highway to enable better traffic flow into the city, particularly during peak times. The project included the installation of new traffic signals on the highway at Fairy Bower, at the intersection of Fairy Bower Road, Old Gracemere Road and the Capricorn Highway. Construction commenced in October 2019 and was completed by July 2021.

Fairy Bower is destined to become the southern access to the new Rockhampton Ring Road which will take the Bruce Highway around the western outskirts of Rockhampton instead of through the city. A new roundabout and high-level slip lane is expected to be constructed at Fairy Bower as part of the Rockhampton Ring Road.

== Demographics ==
In the 2016 census, Fairy Bower had a population of 97 people.

In the 2021 census, Fairy Bower had a population of 99 people.

== Education ==
There are no schools in Fairy Bower. The nearest government primary schools are Gracemere State School in neighbouring Gracemere to the south and Port Curtis Road State School in Port Curtis to the south-east. The nearest government secondary school is Rockhampton State High School in Wandal to the north. There are numerous non-government school in neighbouring The Range to the north-east and in other Rockhampton suburbs.

== Big Bulls ==
The roundabout (often called the Yeppen roundabout presumably taking its name from the nearby Yeppen Yeppen Lagoon) where the highways meet is well known for the large statue of a Brahman bull that stands in the middle of the roundabout, being one of seven Big Bulls that decorate Rockhampton, which regards itself as the Beef Capital of Australia. The group of bull statues is listed as one of Australia's big things.

This particular bull attracts some criticism for facing towards the city so approaching motorists are welcomed to the city by a view of its rear end which includes its large testicles. The theft of the testicles from the bulls is a common prank and they frequently have to be replaced. Some residents also feel that the bull statues over-emphasise one aspect of the city and should be relocated to less prominent locations. However, there is strong public support for the retention of the bulls.
