= Big Bulls =

Set of statues in Queensland, Australia

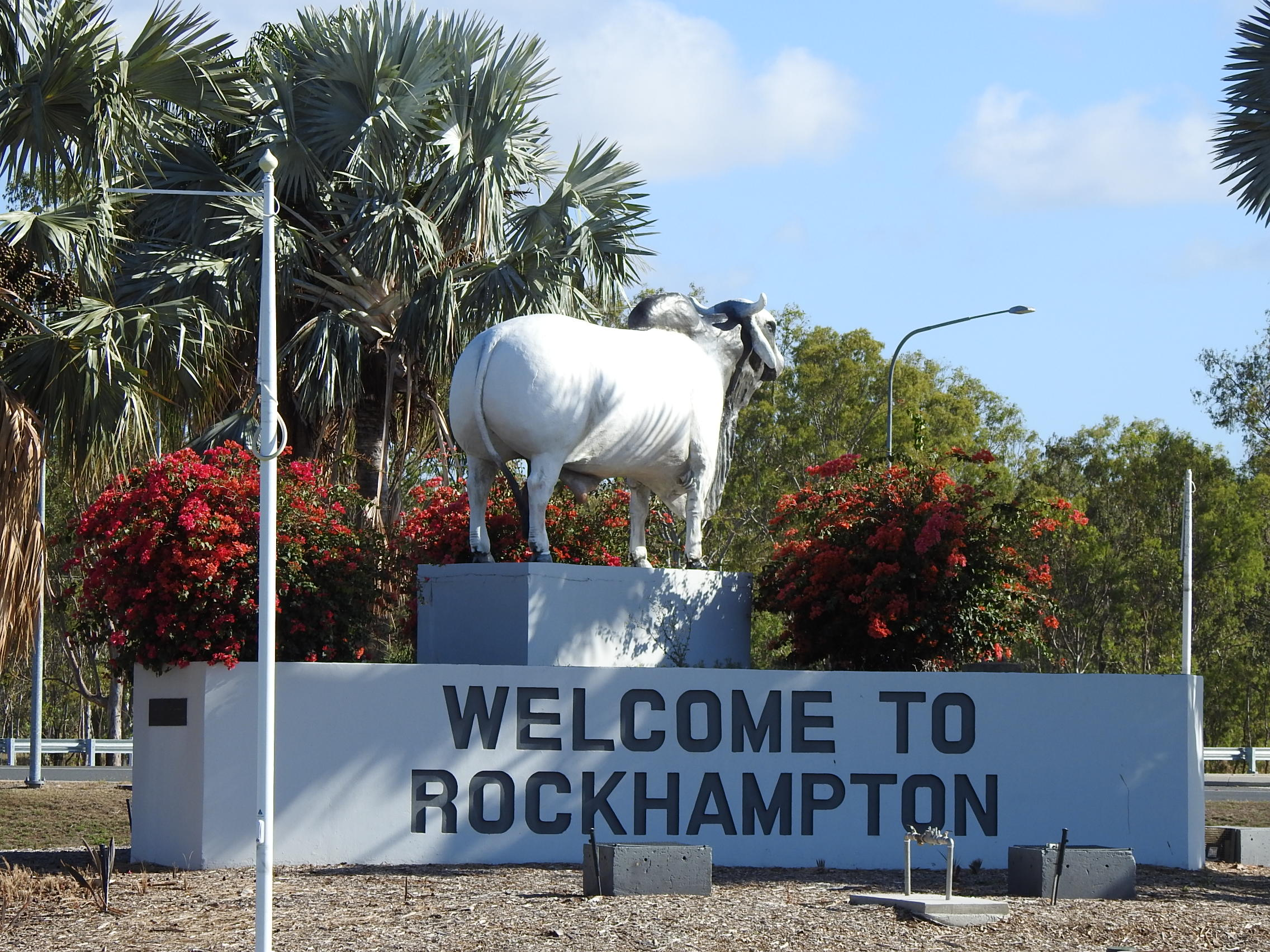
Brahman bull, Yeppen roundabout. "Welcome to Rockhampton"

The Big Bulls are a set of seven large statues of bulls that decorate the city of Rockhampton, Queensland, Australia. The set is regarded as one of Australia's big things and is intended to reinforce Rockhampton's claim to being the Beef Capital of Australia. Initially there were two bull statues but over time others were added reaching a total of seven. Five of the bulls were created by sculptor Hugh Anderson.

The theft of the testicles from the bulls is a common prank and they frequently have to be replaced. Some residents also feel that the bull statues overemphasise one aspect of the city and should be relocated to less prominent locations. However, there is strong public support for the retention of the bulls.

== Locations ==
The first six bull statues are located near highways and major roads and were built to be realistic depictions of breeds of cattle raised in the area; the seventh was constructed as an art work for display at the Rockhampton Art Gallery. The bull statues are:

Breed	Location	Notes	Photo
Brahman	Yeppen roundabout at Fairy Bower, the junction of the Bruce Highway and Capricorn Highway (23.414329°S 150.497414°E)	The bull is on a plinth indicating 'Welcome to Rockhampton', and 'Farewell from Rockhampton'.	
Santa Gertrudis	Frank Forde Park on the northern side of the intersection of the Bruce Highway (also known as Gladstone Road) and Upper Dawson Road in Allenstown (23.407593°S 150.500426°E)	Plaque listing (53 donors). In recognition of the contribution Santa Gertrudis have made to the beef industry. Arranged by Burnett Joyce. Opened by the mayor Ald. Jim Webber, 18 September 1985. 'Thanks to those who made it possible'	
Romagnola	O'Shanesy Park on the north-eastern side of the intersection of the Bruce Highway (also known as Gladstone Road) and Jellicoe Street in Allenstown (23.407657°S 150.501140°E)	Plaque: Romagnola Breeders' Society Ltd. has given this statue of a romagnola bull to the City of Rockhampton to commemorate the World Romagnola Congress. Unveiled by His Worship the Mayor Councillor James McRae on 13 April 1997	
Braford	Median strip on the Bruce Highway (also known as Gladstone Road) just north of the intersection with Stanley Street in Allenstown (23.3892867°S 150.5068485°E)	Plaque: Rockhampton. The Beef City. This sculpture financed by (29 donors). Dedicated by the Honourable V. B. Sullivan M.L.A., Minister for Primary Industries on 16th. November 1978	
Droughtmaster	roundabout on Hunter Street in front of the Rockhampton Airport in West Rockhampton (23.378917°S 150.479607°E)	Plaque: Droughtmaster Stud Breeders' Society Limited. Commemorates the Production by the University of Central Queensland of this replica of the Droughtmaster, Australia's Own Beef Cattle Breed Evolved in Queensland, unveiled by Mr Stan Jones Q.C., The Chancellor of the University of Central Queensland, On Tuesday, April 19, 1994.	
Brahman	Median strip of the Bruce Highway (also known as Yaamba Road) on the boundary of Park Avenue and Norman Gardens (opposite #411; 23.343126°S 150.520673°E)	Plaque: Rockhampton. The Beef City. This sculpture financed by (40 donors). Dedicated by the Honourable V. B. Sullivan M.L.A., Minister for Primary Industries on 16th. November 1978	
Art work	At the entrance to Rockhampton Art Gallery, 62 Victoria Parade in Rockhampton City beside the Fitzroy River (23.372636°S 150.509126°E)	'Under the Hammer', a sculpture by Daniel Clemmett made from car bonnet skins in 2011	

== Other bulls ==
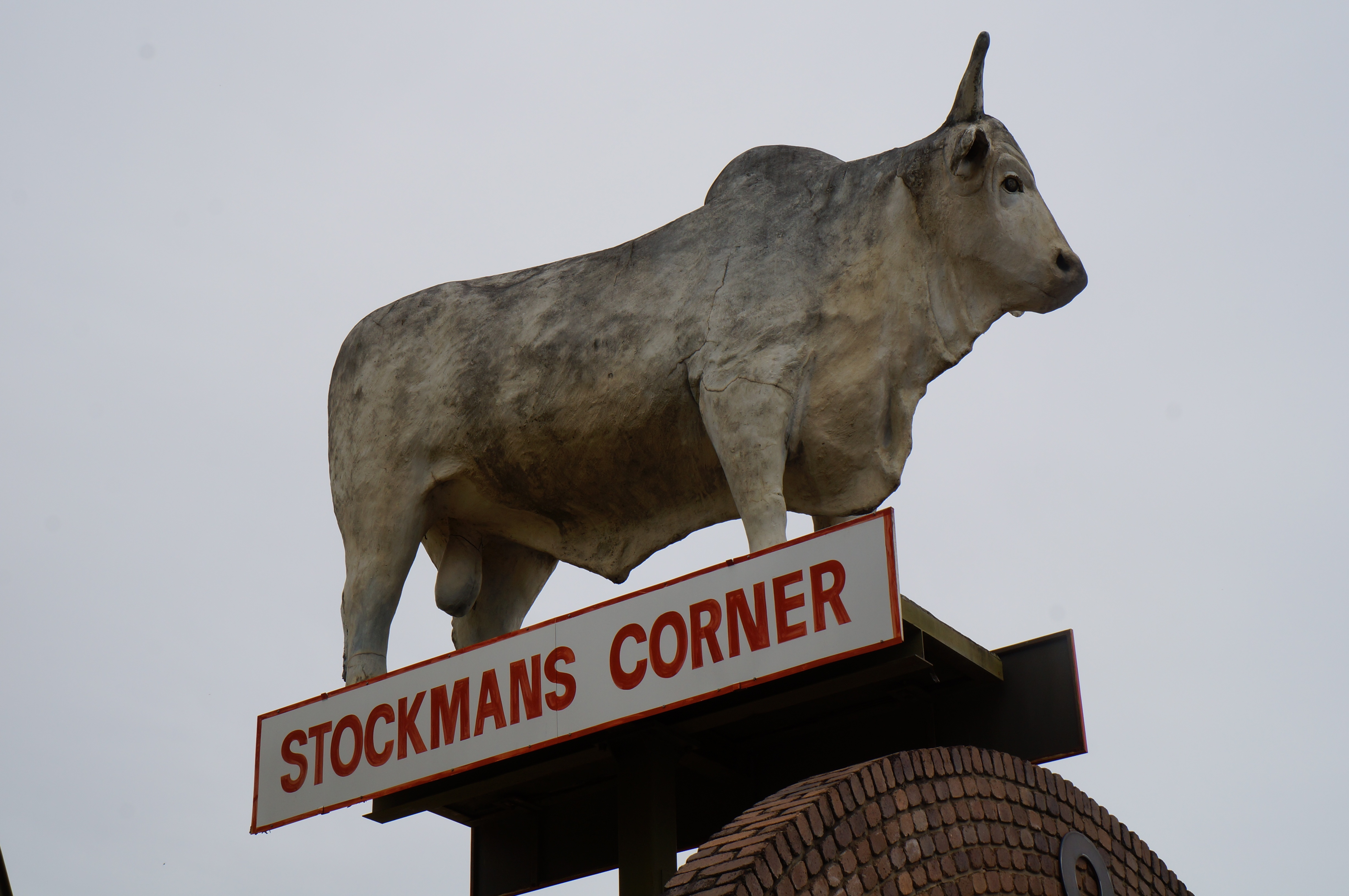
A Rockhampton big bull at 9 Gladstone Road, Allenstown (2012).

Within Rockhampton, there are other bull statues, including:

- Stockman's Corner clothing store, 9 Gladstone Road, Allenstown. A white bull is raised above the store awning;
- The Lionleigh Pub, 1 Wandal Road, Wandal. A brown bull stands atop the awning of the pub;
- 'Lease-A-Bull', 184 Musgrave Street, Berserker. A braford bull, on top of a building awning; and
- Korte's Resort, 984 Yaamba Road, Parkhurst. The entrance to the motel has three beige bulls together.

== Proposed bulls ==
In 2021, the Belmont Red Breed Society bemoaned the fact their breed was not yet represented in the series of statues despite it having been developed at the Belmont Research Station near Rockhampton. President of the Belmont Red Breed Society, Jeanne Seifert said a statue of a Belmont Red bull would not only be a good focal point for visitors to the city but also a tribute to the contribution which had been made by scientists and the CSIRO. Her father, Dr George Seifert, was a principal research scientist based at the Belmont Research Station, credited with helping develop the composition of the breed.
