= Park Avenue, Queensland =

Park Avenue
- Suburb
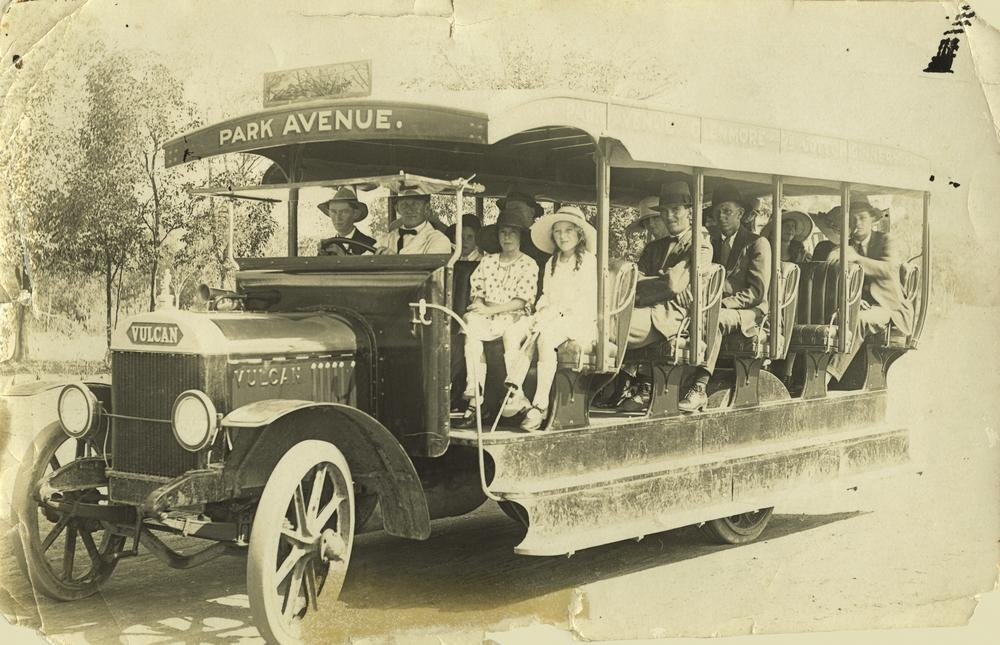
- Passengers on the Park Avenue route bus, 1930

- Interactive map of Park Avenue
- Coordinates: 23.3569°S 150.5113°E
- Country: Australia
- State: Queensland
- City: Rockhampton
- LGA: Rockhampton Region
- Location: 3.7 km (2.3 mi) NE of Rockhampton CBD; 620 km (390 mi) NNW of Brisbane

Government
  - State electorate: Rockhampton
  - Federal division: Capricornia

Area
  - Total: 4.6 km^{2} (1.8 sq mi)
- Elevation: 10 m (33 ft)

Population
  - Total: 5,292 (2021 census)
  - Density: 1,150/km^{2} (2,980/sq mi)
- Time zone: UTC+10:00 (AEST)
- Postcode: 4701
Suburbs around Park Avenue
Kawana	Kawana	Norman Gardens
Kawana	Park Avenue	Frenchville
Wandal	Rockhampton City	Berserker

Park Avenue is a suburb of Rockhampton in the Rockhampton Region, Queensland, Australia. In the 2021 census, Park Avenue had a population of 5,292 people.

== Geography ==
Park Avenue is bounded on the south-west by the Fitzroy River, which divides Rockhampton from North Rockhampton. The Neville Hewitt Bridge crosses the river from Rockhampton City to the south-west to Park Avenue, which carries the Bruce Highway through Rockhampton towards the north.

The Alexandra Railway Bridge also crosses from the CBD to Park Avenue, carrying the North Coast railway line from Rockhampton railway station south of the river to Park Avenue where it proceeds north through Park Avenue to Kawana. Park Avenue is served by two railway stations:

- Park Avenue railway stationi (now closed) in the centre of the suburb (23.3575°S 150.5113°E)
- Glenmore Junction railway station in the south of the suburb (23.3620°S 150.5122°E)

The Yeppoon railway line separates from the North Coast line immediately south of Glenmore Junction, travelling south-east into Berserker.

The suburb is predominantly residential with an industrial area in the south and another in the north-west. Stockland Rockhampton is a major shopping centre in the eastern corner of the suburb. There is also commercial strip along Yaamba Road, the north-eastern boundary of the suburb.

Kershaw Gardens and the Tom Nutley Field are along the south-western edge of the suburb with Queen's Park on the southern tip of the suburb, beside the Fitzroy River and the Neville Hewitt Bridge.

The Rockhampton-Yeppoon Road (as Yaamba Road) runs along the north-eastern boundary, concurrent with the Bruce Highway.

== History ==
Park Avenue State School opened on 7 October 1901.

St Joseph's Catholic Primary School opened on 28 January 1929.

St Matthew's Anglican Church opened in 1940. In 1968 it was demolished and a senior citizen's village established on the site called St Matthew's Cottages. It was at 54 Macalister Street.

St Stanislaus College, a Catholic boys secondary school, opened in 1958 and Marian College, a Catholic girls secondary school, opened in 1964. These schools merged to form Emmaus College, a co-educational Catholic secondary school, opening on 1 February 1983.

== Demographics ==
In the 2011 census, Park Avenue had a population of 5,366 people.

In the 2016 census, Park Avenue had a population of 5,094 people.

In the 2021 census, Park Avenue had a population of 5,292 people.

== Education ==
Park Avenue State School is a government primary (Early Childhood-6) school for boys and girls at 5-13 Main Street (23.3593°S 150.5071°E). In 2018, the school had an enrolment of 129 students with 20 teachers (16 full-time equivalent) and 28 non-teaching staff (19 full-time equivalent). It includes a special education program.

St Joseph's Catholic Primary School is a Catholic primary (Prep-6) school at Main Street (23.3575°S 150.5100°E).

Emmaus College is a Catholic secondary school for boys and girls in Rockhampton. It has its Years 10-12 campus at 185 Main Street (23.3502°S 150.5220°E). Its Years 7-9 campus is in Norman Gardens. In 2018, the school had an enrolment of 1,274 students with 102 teachers (95 full-time equivalent) and 69 non-teaching staff (54 full-time equivalent).

There are no government secondary schools in Park Avenue. The nearest government secondary schools are Glenmore State High School in neighbouring Kawana to the north-west, North Rockhampton State High School in neighbouring Frenchville to the east, and Rockhampton State High School in Wandal across the Fitzroy River to the south-west.

== Amenities ==
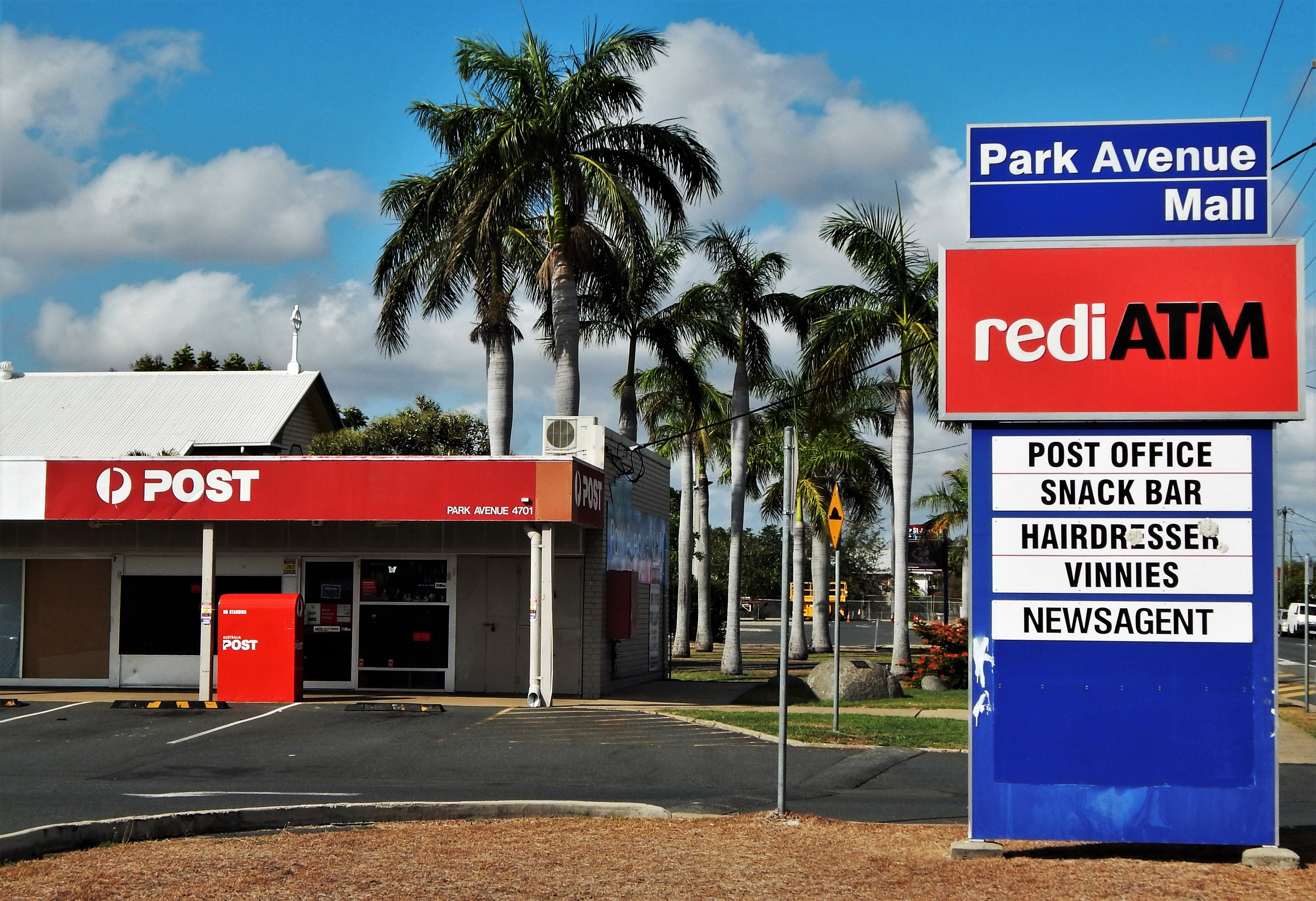
Park Avenue Licensed Post Office at the Park Avenue Mall in Main Street

Stockland Rockhampton (formerly Rockhampton Shopping Fair) is a shopping centre on the Bruce Highway extending into neighbouring Berserker (23.3541°S 150.5228°E).

Park Avenue Mall is a shopping center at 37 Main Street (23.3575°S 150.5108°E). It contains the Park Avenue Post Office.

Our Lady Help of Christians Catholic Church is at 33 Main Street (23.3575°S 150.5104°E) between the Park Avenue Mall and St Joseph's School.

== Big Bulls ==
On the median strip of the Bruce Highway on the border of Park Avenue and Norman Gardens (opposite #411; 23.343126°S 150.520673°E) is one of the seven Big Bulls statues that decorate Rockhampton, which regards itself as the Beef Capital of Australia. The Big Bulls are listed as one of Australia's big things.
