= Norman Gardens, Queensland =

Norman Gardens
- Suburb
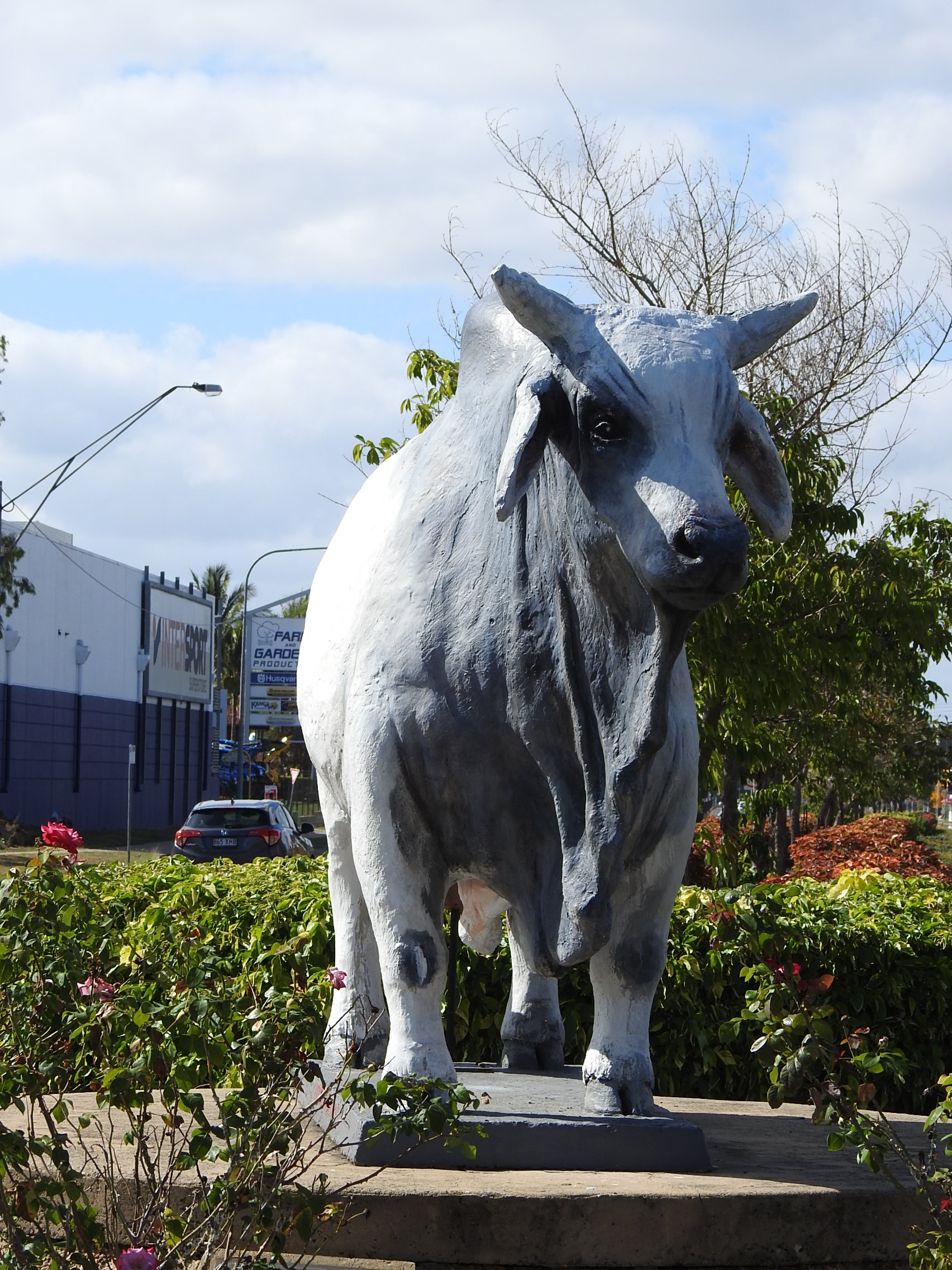
- Big Bull (Brahman) statue

- Interactive map of Norman Gardens
- Coordinates: 23.3275°S 150.5355°E
- Country: Australia
- State: Queensland
- City: Rockhampton
- LGA: Rockhampton Region
- Location: 7.4 km (4.6 mi) NE of Rockhampton CBD; 631 km (392 mi) NNW of Brisbane

Government
  - State electorate: Keppel
  - Federal division: Capricornia

Area
  - Total: 13.2 km^{2} (5.1 sq mi)

Population
  - Total: 10,534 (2021 census)
  - Density: 798.0/km^{2} (2,067/sq mi)
- Time zone: UTC+10:00 (AEST)
- Postcode: 4701
Suburbs around Norman Gardens
Parkhurst	Parkhurst	Limestone Creek
Kawana	Norman Gardens	Mount Archer
Park Avenue	Berserker	Frenchville

Norman Gardens is a suburb in the Rockhampton Region, Queensland, Australia. In the 2021 census, Norman Gardens had a population of 10,534 people.

== Geography ==
Norman Gardens is bounded by the Bruce Highway to the west, Yeppoon Road to the north and by Moores Creek (a tributary of the Fitzroy River) to the south. The main Rockhampton campus of the Central Queensland University is in the north-west corner of suburb on the corner of the Bruce Highway and the Yeppoon Road. The North Rockhampton Cemetery is located in the south-west of the suburb on the corner of the Bruce Highway and Moores Creek Road with the rest of area along the Bruce Highway being commercial premises with the residential areas behind them to the east.

The western side of the locality is relatively flat (30–50 metres above sea level) and is cleared and developed. However, in the east of the locality the land become more mountainous with Peak Hill, also known as Sugar Loaf Hill, (23.3116°S 150.5361°E) rising to 223 metres (732 ft) and an unnamed peak (280 metres). This land is mostly undeveloped apart from a quarry at Peak Hill.

== Road infrastructure ==
The Rockhampton-Yeppoon Road (as Yaamba Road) runs along the western boundary, concurrent with the Bruce Highway, and along the northern boundary (as Yeppoon Road).

== History ==
St Nicholas' Catholic Primary School was officially opened by Archbishop James Duhig on Sunday 22 November 1908 in Koongal. It was operated by the Sisters of Mercy. On 14 July 1981, the school relocated to Norman Gardens, where it was renamed St Anthony’s.

Norman Park Christian School opened in January 1994 with 25 students. It was an initiative of the Norman Park Baptist Church. In 2004 it was renamed Lighthouse Christian School.

St Stanislaus College, a Catholic boys secondary school, opened in 1958 and Marian College, a Catholic girls secondary school, opened in 1964. These schools merged to form Emmaus College, a co-educational Catholic secondary school, opening on 1 February 1983.

== Demographics ==
In the 2016 census, Norman Gardens had a population of 9,944 people.

In the 2021 census, Norman Gardens had a population of 10,534 people.

== Education ==
St Anthony's Catholic Primary School is a private primary (Prep-6) school at 390b Feez Street (23.3404°S 150.5273°E).

Lighthouse Christian School is a private primary and secondary (Prep-12) school for boys and girls at 480 Norman Road (23.3387°S 150.5375°E). In 2018, the school had an enrolment of 238 students with 20 teachers (18 full-time equivalent) and 21 non-teaching staff (15 full-time equivalent).

Emmaus College is a Catholic secondary school for boys and girls in Rockhampton. It has its Years 7-9 campus at 362 Yaamba Road (23.3465°S 150.5242°E). Its Years 7-9 campus is in Norman Gardens. In 2018, the school had an enrolment of 1,274 students with 102 teachers (95 full-time equivalent) and 69 non-teaching staff (54 full-time equivalent).

There are no government schools in Norman Gardens. The nearest government primary schools are Glenmore State School in neighbouring Kawana to the west, Frenchville State School in neighbouring Frenchville to the south-east, and Parkhurst State School in neighbouring Parkhurst to the north. The nearest government secondary school is Glenmore State High School in neighbouring Kawana to the west and North Rockhampton State High School in neighbouring Frenchville to the south-east.

Central Queensland University has its Rockhampton North Campus in the suburb (23.3241°S 150.5195°E).

== Facilities ==
North Rockhampton Cemetery is at 350-360 Yaamba Road in the south of the suburb (23.3488°S 150.5254°E).

A new park featuring a playground and ninja-themed obstacle course officially opened in Springfield Drive at Norman Gardens in July 2025. In September 2025, the park was officially named John Broad Park, as a posthumous tribute to community leader, AFL Queensland Hall of Fame inductee and former Rockhampton City Council councillor John Broad who died in 2016.

== Amenities ==
Churches in the suburb include:

- Holy Family Catholic Church, 390 Feez Street (23.3415°S 150.5269°E)
- Rockhampton Baptist Tabernacle, 650 Norman Road (23.3297°S 150.5331°E)
- Lighthouse Baptist Church, 480 Norman Road (23.3382°S 150.5384°E)

Bluebirds United Sports Club is a sports centre (23.3359°S 150.5284°E).

== Big Bulls ==
On the median strip of the Bruce Highway on the border of Park Avenue and Norman Gardens (opposite #411; 23.343126°S 150.520673°E) is one of the seven Big Bulls statues that decorate Rockhampton, which regards itself as the Beef Capital of Australia. The Park Avenue/Norman Gardens statue is of a Braham bull. The Big Bulls are listed as one of Australia's big things.
