= Allenstown, Queensland =

Allenstown Rockhampton, Queensland
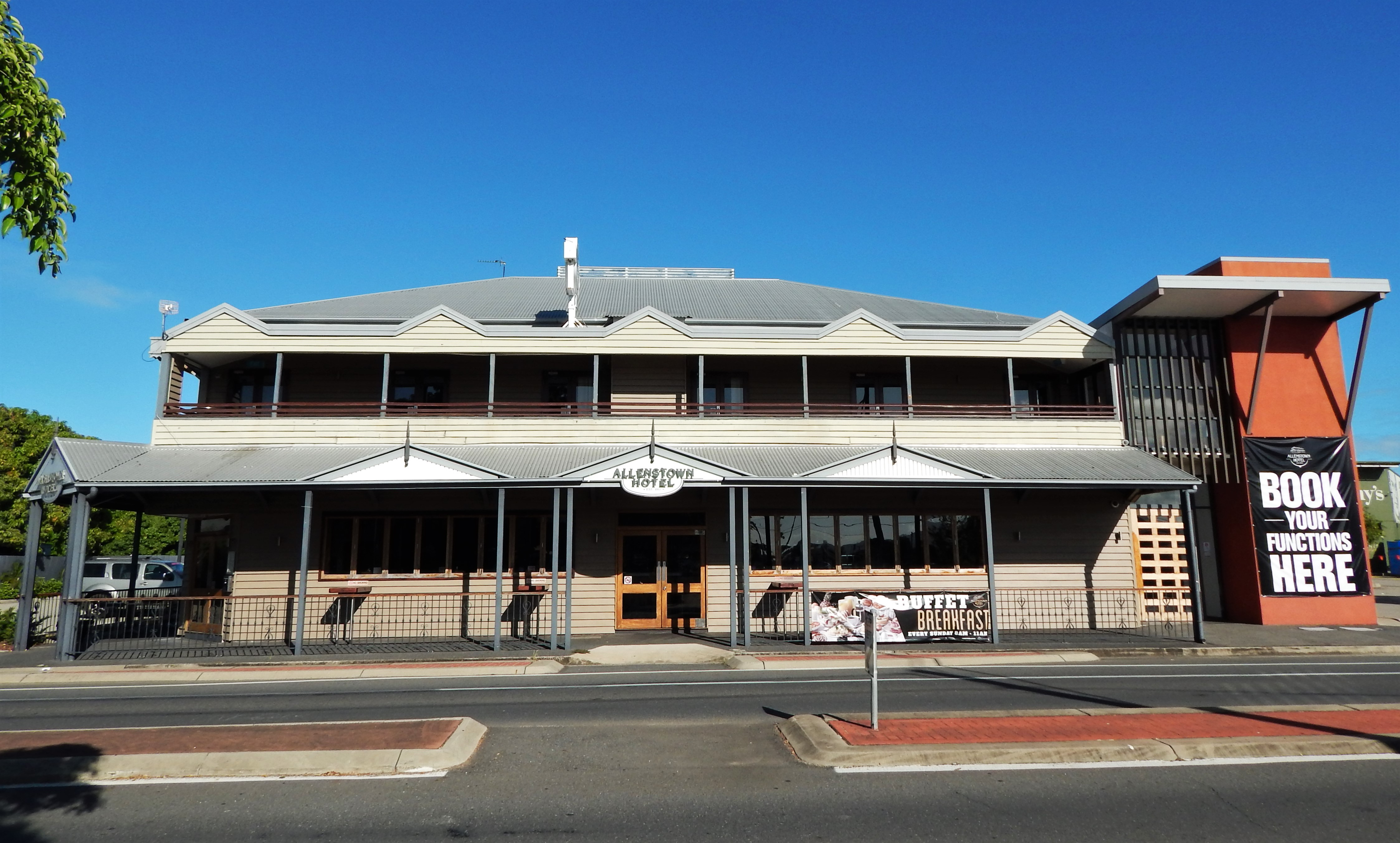
- Allenstown Hotel, 2020

- Coordinates: 23.3966°S 150.5041°E
- Population: 2,762 (2021 census)
  - Density: 1,255/km^{2} (3,250/sq mi)
- Postcode(s): 4700
- Area: 2.2 km^{2} (0.8 sq mi)
- Time zone: AEST (UTC+10:00)
- Location: 1.6 km (1 mi) SW of Rockhampton CBD; 630 km (391 mi) NNW of Brisbane
- LGA(s): Rockhampton Region
- State electorate(s): Rockhampton
- Federal division(s): Capricornia
Suburbs around Allenstown:
The Range	Rockhampton City	Rockhampton City
The Range	Allenstown	Depot Hill
Fairy Bower	Fairy Bower	Port Curtis

Allenstown is an inner southern suburb of Rockhampton, Rockhampton Region, Queensland, Australia. It is situated 1.6 kilometres (0.99 mi) by road south-west of the Rockhampton CBD. In the 2021 census, Allenstown had a population of 2,762 people.

== Geography ==
The main business precinct of Allenstown is anchored by local shopping centre Allenstown Square, which was previously known as Allenstown Plaza before undergoing a major refurbishment and extension which was completed in 2012.

== History ==
The suburb is named after William Allen, builder, around 1862. Allen's decision to sell blocks of land for thirty pounds following his return from the Canoona gold rush, which saw many new cottages being built, prompted the locals to dub the suburb "Allen's town".

In 1864, Patrick Egan established the Merry Jig Hotel.

Rockhampton Cemetery opened circa 1864 although the earliest headstones was dated as 1862. It replaced an earlier cemetery at Col Brown Park beside the Fitzroy River. Following the opening of the North Rockhampton Cemetery, it became known as South Rockhampton Cemetery. It closed in 1993 and is now heritage-listed. The cemetery is organised by religious denominations.

In December 1870, tenders were called from carpenters to erect a Wesleyan Methodist church in Allenstown. The church was opened on Sunday 16 April 1871. It was designed by architect Septimus Nash Spong and described as "handsome and commodious". It was 33 by 23 feet (10.1 by 7.0 m) and capable of seating 100 people. It was organised and paid for by the "munificence" of Andrew Ross of Balnagowan. In November 1880, it was agreed that a new "central and substantial" church would be erected at an expected cost of £650, which would be funded in part by the sale of the Allenstown Wesleyan church and the Kent Street Wesleyan Church in the Rockhampton CBD. The new church was opened in Campbell Street on Sunday 24 July 1881 with the Allenstown Wesleyan church building relocated to the rear of the new church at Campbell Street where it was used as a vestry and Sunday school.

Allenstown State School opened on 16 July 1877. The school celebrated its centenary in 1977.

On 15 October 1899, St Joseph's Catholic Cathedral was officially opened by Cardinal Patrick Francis Moran of the Sydney Archdiocese with a celebration of the Pontifical High Mass.

On Sunday 14 October 1900, the foundation stone was laid for St Mark's Anglican Church. Its opening service was held on Sunday 23 December 1900. The church was sold in 2021.

From 1909 until 1939, the city's tramway serviced Allenstown along Upper Dawson Road. In 2019, some of the original tram tracks were unearthed during local council roadworks.

The Cathedral College opened on 4 February 1991.

== Demographics ==
In the 2006 census, Allenstown had a population of 2,721 people.

In the 2011 census, Allenstown had a population of 2,911 people.

In the 2016 census, Allenstown had a population of 2,790 people.

In the 2021 census, Allenstown had a population of 2,762 people.

== Heritage listings ==
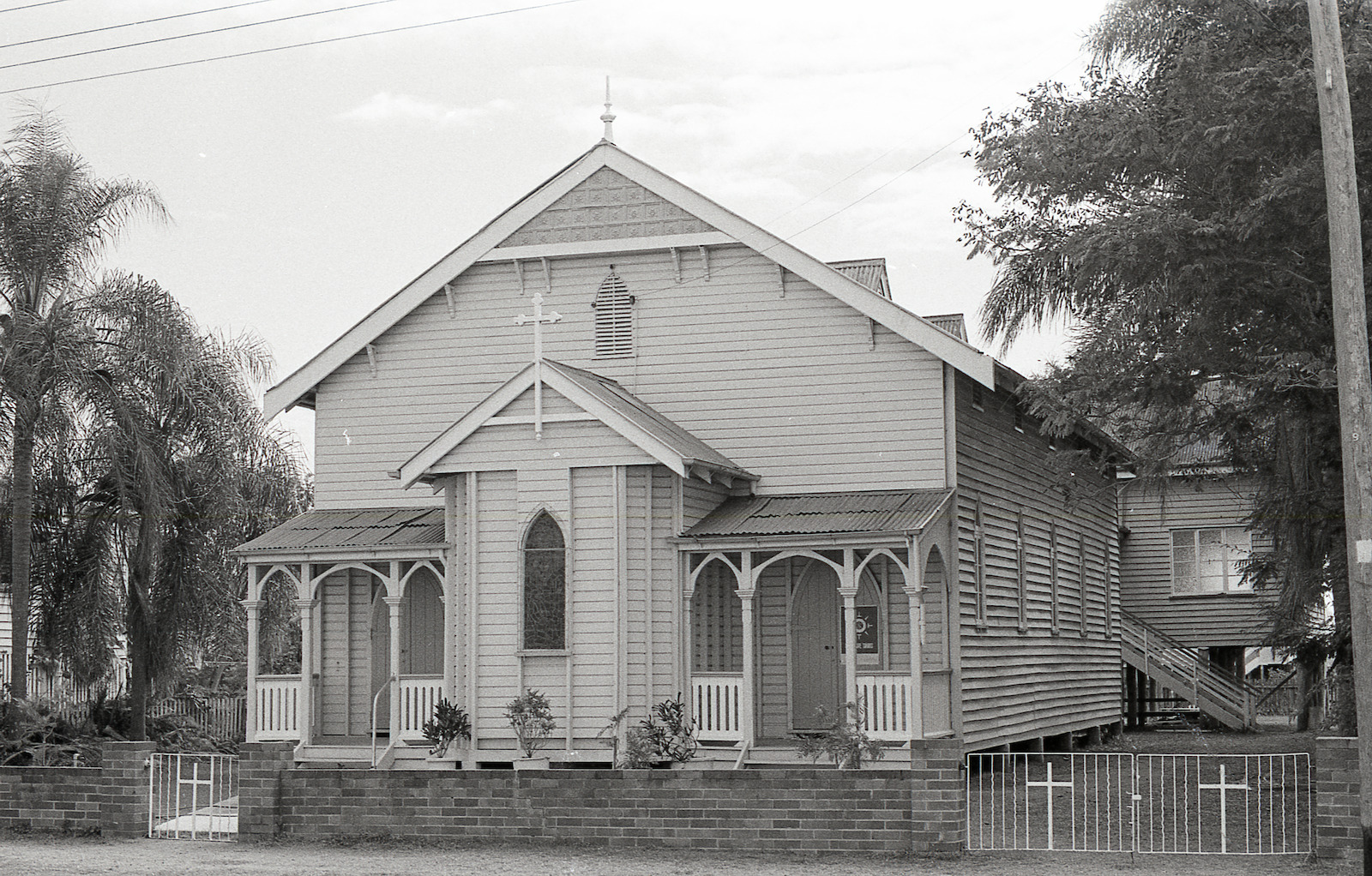
St Mark's Anglican Church, 1975

Allenstown has a number of heritage-listed sites, including:

- St Mark's Anglican Church, 36 Larnach Street
- South Rockhampton Cemetery, Upper Dawson Road
- Allenstown State School, 13–33 Upper Dawson Road
- St Josephs Catholic Cathedral, 170 William Street

== Education ==
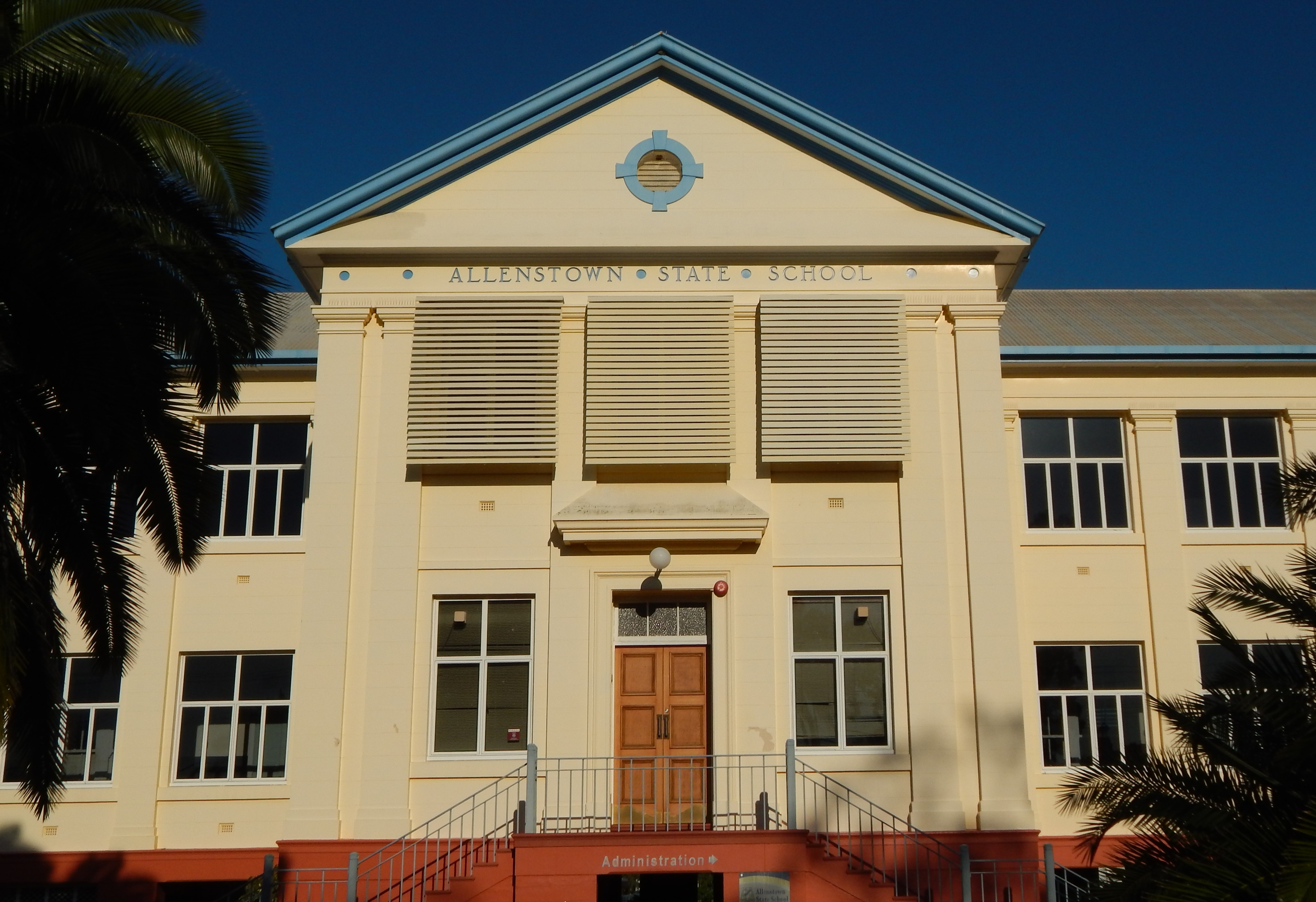
Allenstown State School, 2021

Allenstown State School is a government primary (Preparatory to Year 6) school for boys and girls at 13–33 Upper Dawson Road (23.3919°S 150.5026°E). In 2018, the school had an enrolment of 381 students with 31 teachers (29 full-time equivalent) and 27 non-teaching staff (17 full-time equivalent). It includes a special education program.

The Cathedral College is a Catholic secondary (7–12) school for boys and girls at 189 William Street (23.3861°S 150.5051°E). In 2018, the school had an enrolment of 1,178 students with 79 teachers (78 full-time equivalent) and 59 non-teaching staff (48 full-time equivalent).

There is no government secondary school in Allenstown. The nearest government secondary school is Rockhampton State High School in Wandal to the north.

== Amenities ==
St Josephs Catholic Cathedral is at 169 William Street (23.3862°S 150.5065°E).

There are a number of parks in the suburb:

- Bolton Park (23.3886°S 150.5062°E)
- Connolly Park (23.3895°S 150.5029°E)
- Frank Forde Park (23.4071°S 150.5005°E)
- Kettle Park (23.3966°S 150.5078°E)
- Musgrave Park (23.3929°S 150.5042°E)
- O'Shanesy Park (23.4059°S 150.5030°E)
- Saleyards Park (23.3937°S 150.5087°E)

Rockhampton Cemetery (also known as South Rockhampton Cemetery) is at 113-171 Upper Dawson Road (23.3988°S 150.5032°E).

== Attractions ==
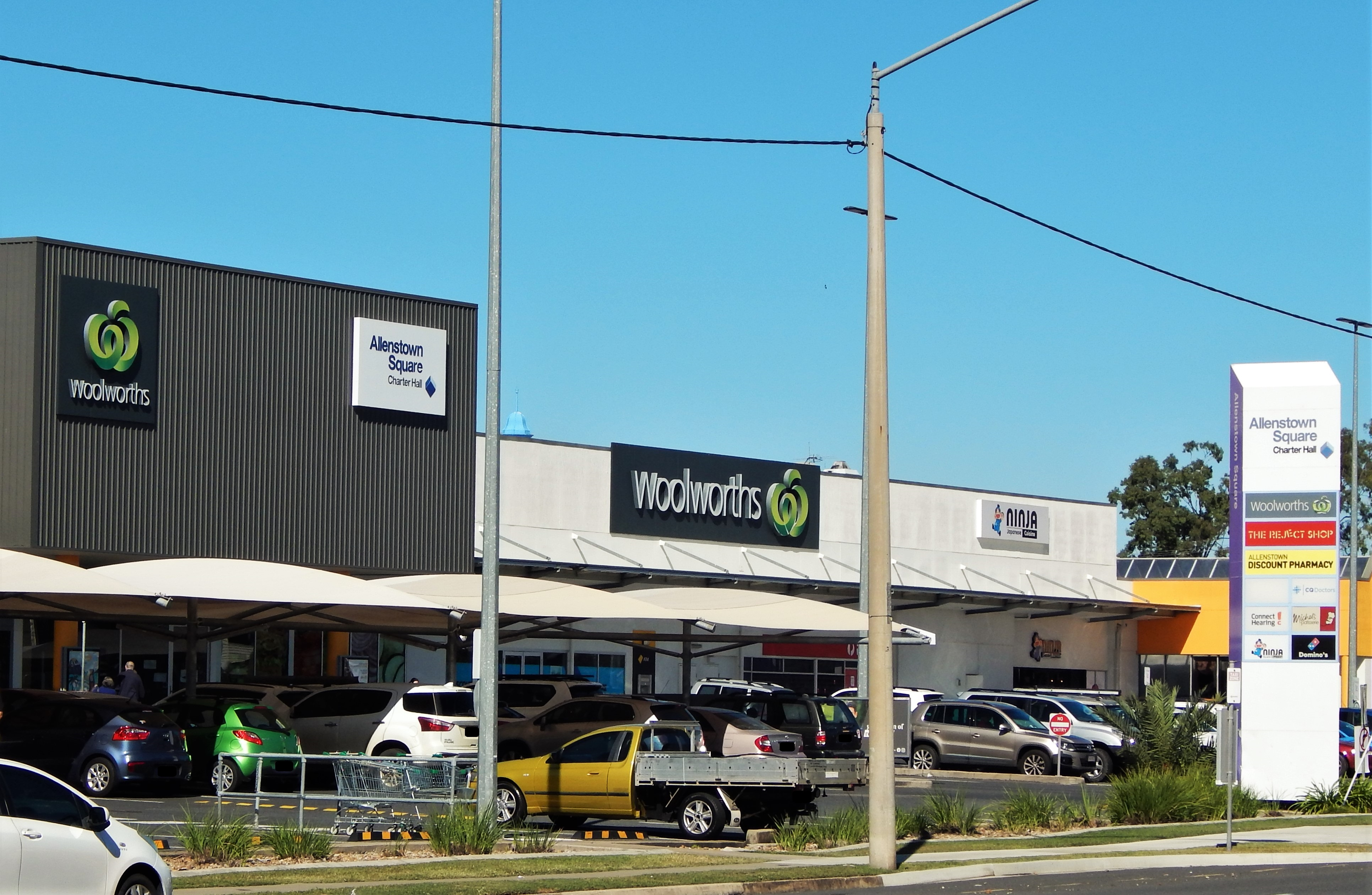
Allenstown Square shopping centre, 2020

Allenstown is home to three of the seven Big Bulls statues that decorate Rockhampton, which regards itself as the Beef Capital of Australia. The three bull statues are located along the Bruce Highway (also known as Gladstone Road) and depict three important cattle varieties raised in the area: Santa Gertrudis, Romagnola, and Braford. The Big Bulls are listed as one of "the big things of Australia".

The theft of the testicles from the bulls is a common prank and they frequently have to be replaced. Some residents also feel that the bull statues overemphasise one aspect of the city and should be relocated to less prominent locations. However, there is strong public support for the retention of the bulls.
