= West Rockhampton, Queensland =

West Rockhampton
- Suburb
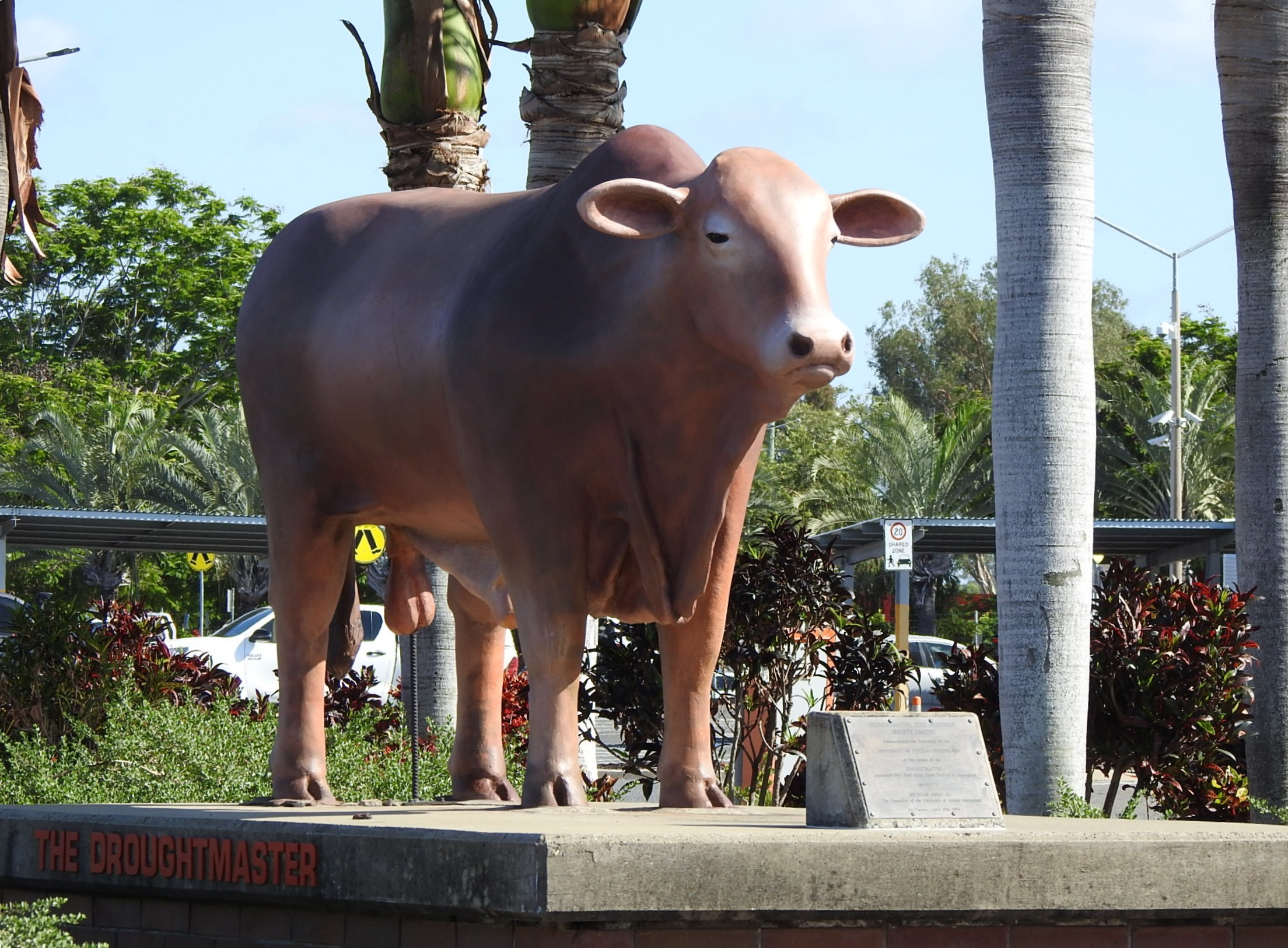
- Droughtmaster statue, one of Rockhampton's Big Bulls, 2019

- Interactive map of West Rockhampton
- Coordinates: 23.3875°S 150.4813°E
- Country: Australia
- State: Queensland
- City: Rockhampton
- LGA: Rockhampton Region
- Location: 3.1 km (1.9 mi) W of Rockhampton; 619 km (385 mi) NNW of Brisbane

Government
  - State electorate: Rockhampton
  - Federal division: Capricornia

Area
  - Total: 6.6 km^{2} (2.5 sq mi)

Population
  - Total: 1,848 (2021 census)
  - Density: 280.0/km^{2} (725/sq mi)
- Time zone: UTC+10:00 (AEST)
- Postcode: 4700
Suburbs around West Rockhampton
Pink Lily	Pink Lily	Wandal
Fairy Bower	West Rockhampton	The Range
Fairy Bower	Fairy Bower	The Range

West Rockhampton is a suburb of Rockhampton in the Rockhampton Region, Queensland, Australia. In the 2021 census, West Rockhampton had a population of 1,848 people.

== Geography ==
West Rockhampton is situated 3.6 kilometres (2.2 mi) by road west of the Rockhampton central business district.

The suburb is bounded to the west by Lion Creek. Murray Lagoon is in the southern corner of the suburb (23.3983°S 150.485°E).

The centre and west of the suburb is occupied by the Rockhampton Airport. The land use in the eastern part is residential.

== History ==
Crescent Lagoon State School opened on 8 July 1896. It moved to its current location in 1932.

In 1905, a Baptist Church opened in West Rockhampton. A stump-capping ceremony took place on Saturday 15 April 1905. The official opening was held over two days, Sunday 11 June 1905 and Sunday 18 June 1905.

== Demographics ==
In the 2006 census, West Rockhampton had a population of 1,457 people.

In the 2011 census, West Rockhampton had a population of 1,810 people.

In the 2016 census, West Rockhampton had a population of 1,825 people.

In the 2021 census, West Rockhampton had a population of 1,848 people.

== Heritage listings ==
West Rockhampton has the following heritage listings:

- St Aubins (house), Canoona Road

== Education ==
Crescent Lagoon State School is a government primary (Preparatory to Year 6) school for boys and girls at North Street Extended (23.3825°S 150.4884°E). In 2018, the school had an enrolment of 389 students with 29 teachers (28 full-time equivalent) and 17 non-teaching staff (12 full-time equivalent). It includes a special education program.

There are no secondary schools in West Rockhampton. The nearest government secondary school is Rockhampton State High School in neighbouring Wandal to the north-east.

== Amenities ==
The Rockhampton Regional Council operate a public library at the Rockhampton Airport called the "Anytime Library" (which, as at 2018, is open from 5am to 9:30pm every day).

The Rockhampton Golf Club lies between the Rockhampton Airport and the Rockhampton Botanic Gardens in the south-east of the locality, accessed via at Ann Street Extended (23.39679°S 150.49049°E). It has an 18 hole par 72 golf course designed by golf designer Al Howard.

West Rockhampton is also the location of the Rockhampton Airport, t and the Brothers Rockhampton Roos the local Australian Rules Football Club.

== Big Bulls ==
West Rockhampton is home to one of the seven Big Bulls statues that decorate Rockhampton, which regards itself as the Beef Capital of Australia. There is a statue of a Droughtmaster bull outside Rockhampton Airport. The Big Bulls are listed as one of Australia's big things.

The theft of the testicles from the bulls is a common prank and they frequently have to be replaced. Some residents also feel that the bull statues over-emphasise one aspect of the city and should be relocated to less prominent locations. However, there is strong public support for the retention of the bulls.
