= Rockhampton Airport =

Airport in Queensland, Australia

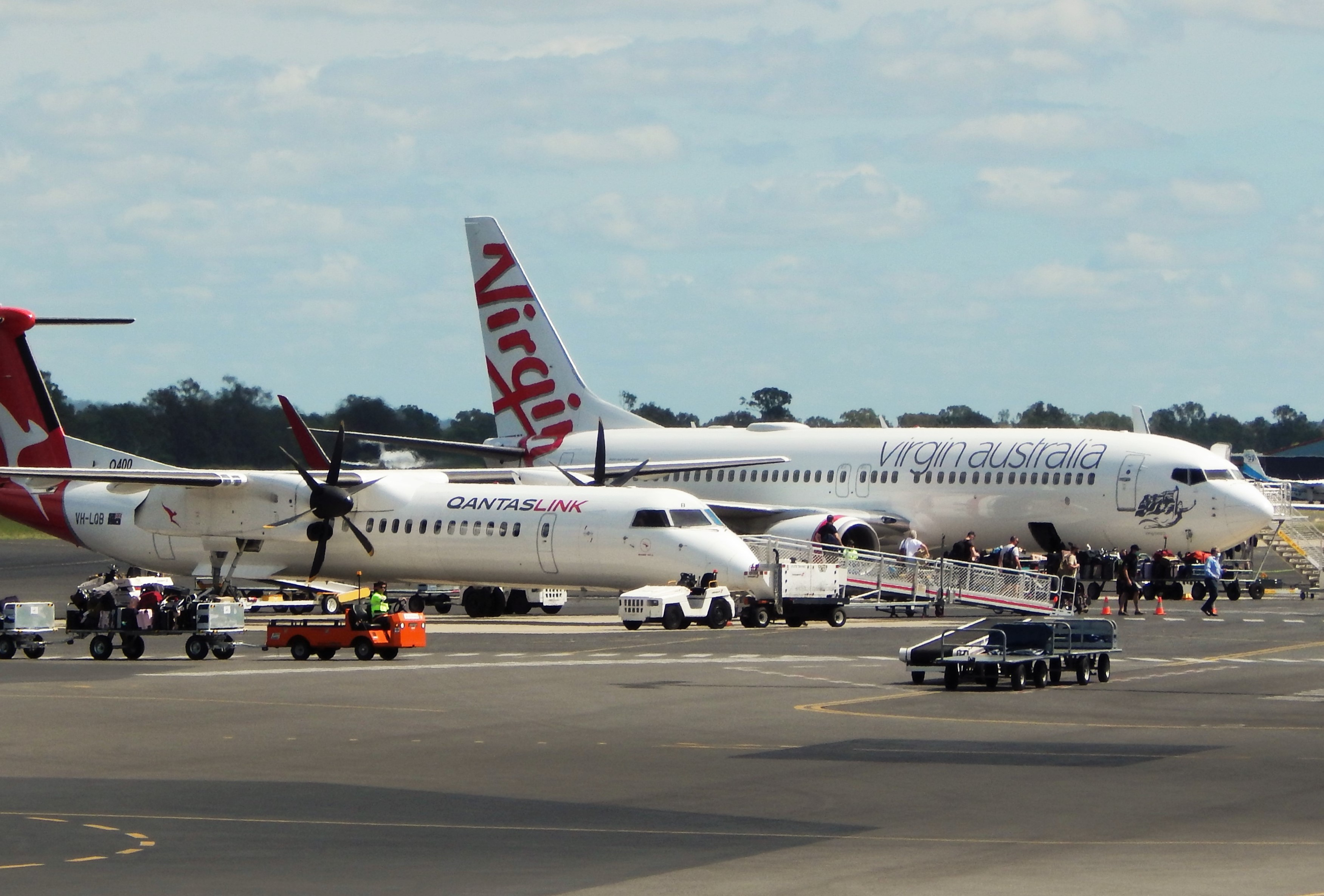
- QantasLink and Virgin Australia services at Rockhampton Airport, 2022
- IATA: ROK; ICAO: YBRK

Summary
- Airport type: Public
- Owner/Operator: Rockhampton Regional Council
- Elevation AMSL: 36 ft (11 m)
- Coordinates: 23.3817°S 150.4750°E
- Website: Rockhampton Airport

Map
- Location in Queensland

Runways
| Direction | Length | | Surface |
| Direction | m | ft | Surface |
|---|---|---|---|
| 04/22 | 1,200 | 3,937 | Asphalt |
| 15/33 | 2,628 | 8,622 | Asphalt |

Statistics (2016/2017)
- Passenger movements: ▼565,716
- Aircraft movements: ▼10,002
- Sources: AIP; Passenger and aircraftmovements from the Department of Infrastructure and Transport

Rockhampton Airport (IATA: ROK, ICAO: YBRK) is a major Australian regional airport in West Rockhampton, Queensland that services the city of Rockhampton, with direct flights to various major centres in Queensland. Services previously operated to New South Wales and Victoria. The airport runway has the capability to handle large aircraft such as the Airbus A380, Boeing 747 and Boeing 777. In 2023–24, it was the 16th busiest airport in Australia, handling 656,238 passengers.

The airport was formerly known as Connor Park Aerodrome, named after the racecourse that once occupied the site. The Royal Flying Doctor Service has one of its nine Queensland bases at Rockhampton Airport.

== History ==
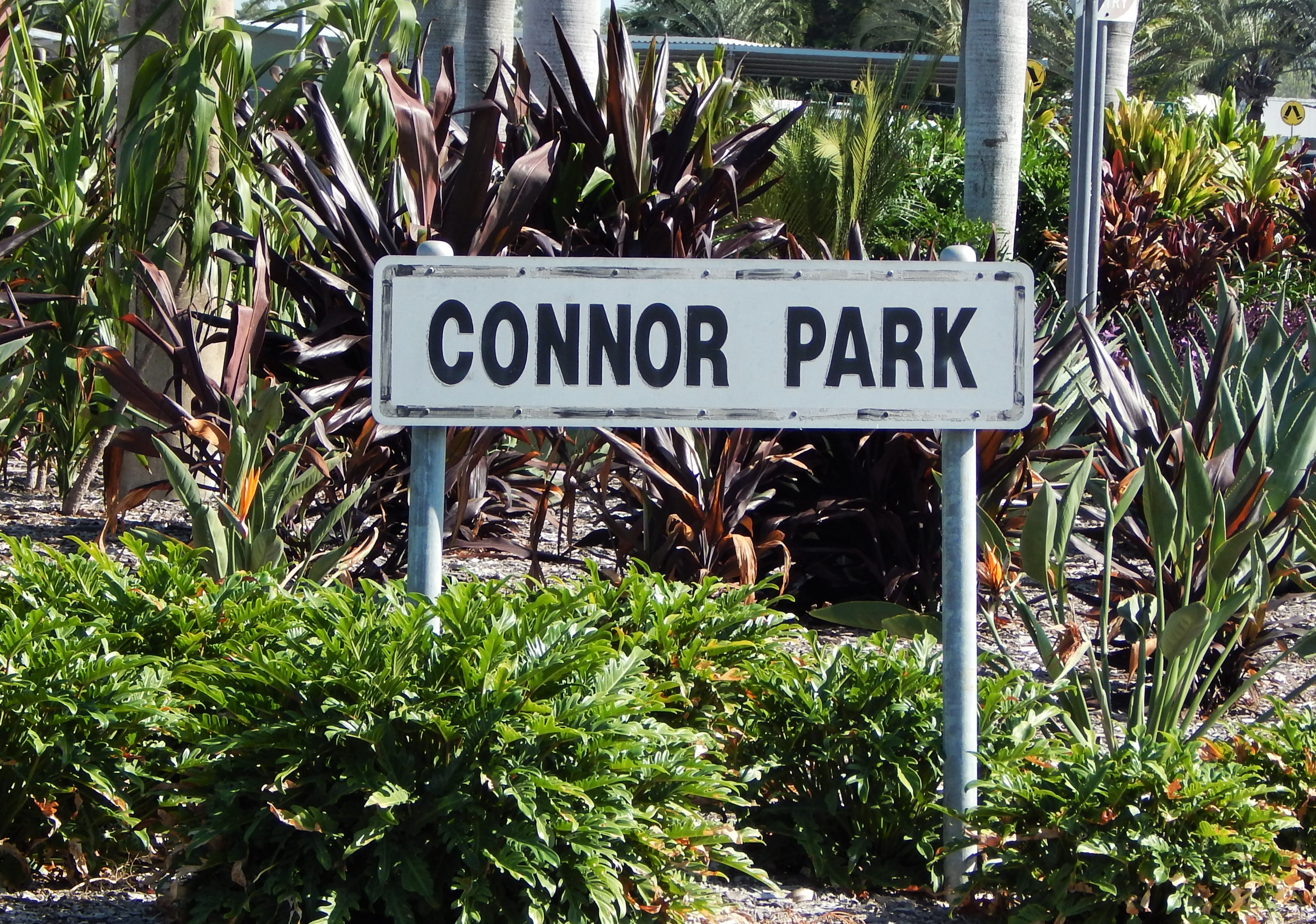
Connor Park sign at Rockhampton Airport, 2022

Efforts to locate a permanent aerodrome site in the city had been proceeding for a number of years in the 1920s. The Rockhampton City Council and the Australian Government, however, could not come to an arrangement as to a suitable site. Prior to 1930, a number of locations within the city had been used for the operation of aircraft, all on a non-official basis and none suitable for long term use.

In 1929, the lease to a former racecourse, Connor Park, was acquired by a number of aspiring aviators, and they set about making it suitable for aircraft. The Rockhampton Aero Club was formed on 9 February 1930, and announced that flying training would commence at the location. The Rockhampton Aero Club continues to operate today, providing flying training and air charter.

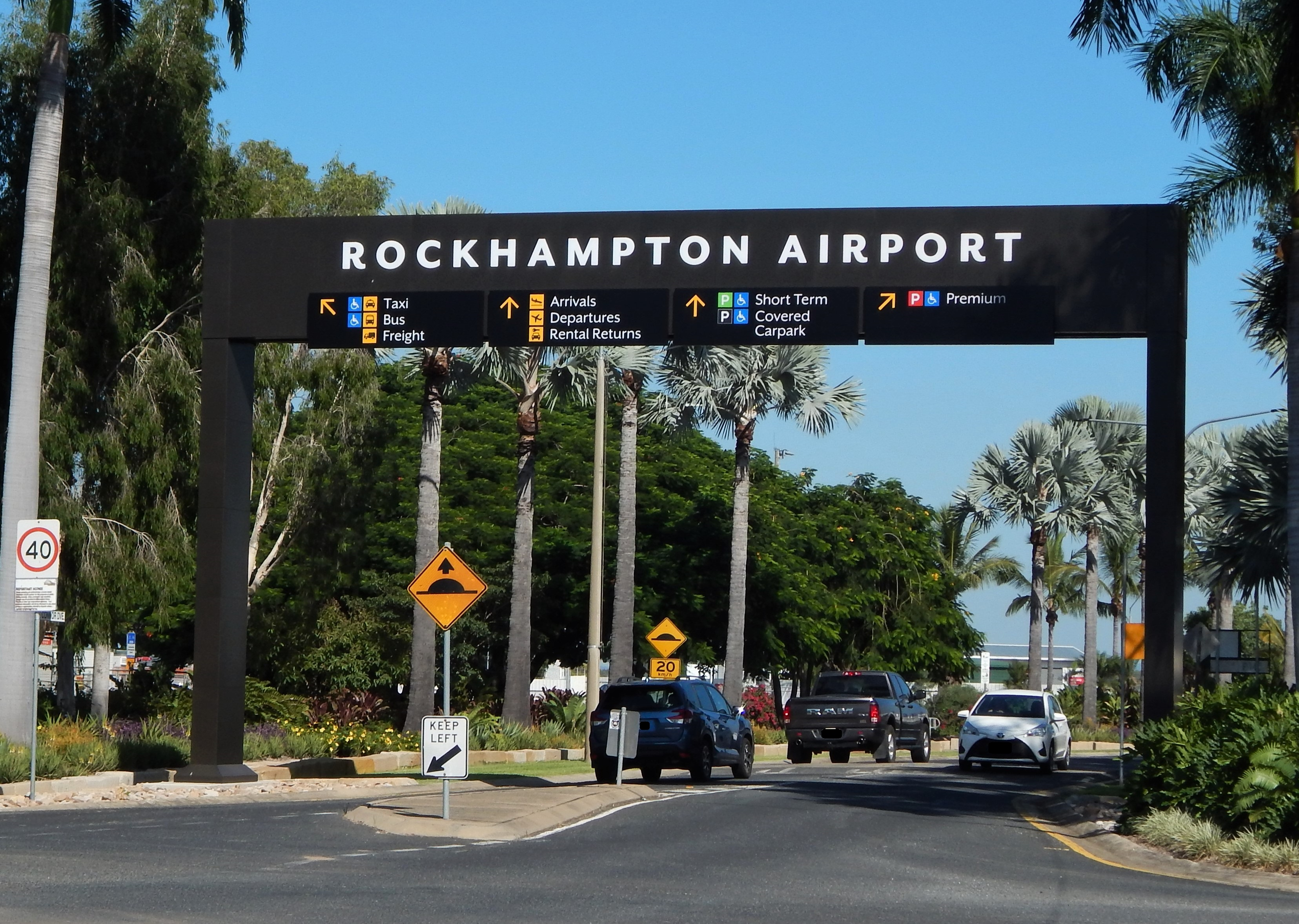
Main entrance to the Rockhampton Airport precinct, 2022

The Rockhampton Aero Club flying field was officially opened on 2 March 1930 by Rockhampton mayor Robert Cousins. The club was formed just three weeks prior with the aim of providing assistance with issues relating to aviation, including lobbying for a permanent landing ground for aircraft flying into the city. A few weeks later, on 15 March 1930 the Rockhampton Aerodrome was officially opened by Alderman Colonel David Day Dawson on behalf of Cousins who was unable to attend. It was only after the Rockhampton Aero Club had been established their flying field at Connor Park that Rockhampton City Council finally decided the same location would ideal for the city's aerodrome and contributed 100 pounds for land clearing. This came after many months of attempting to find a suitable location of an aerodrome with many locations considered including near the Red Hill quarry on Yaamba Road. The first passenger aircraft, a Fokker monoplane, Star of Cairns, landed at the Rockhampton Aerodrome during the official opening.

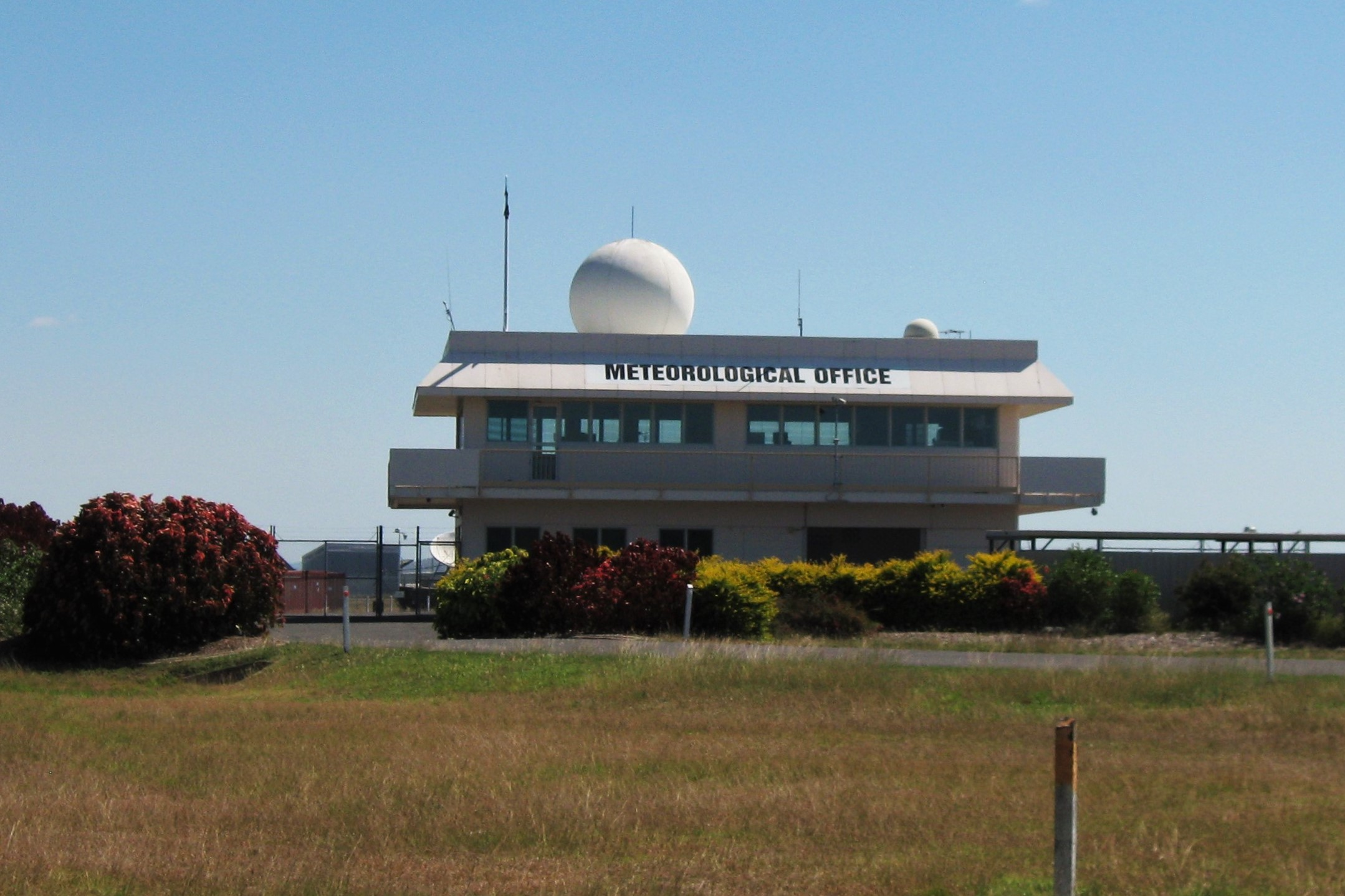
Bureau of Meteorology meteorological office at Rockhampton Airport, 2013

In late 1938, it was announced that a meteorological office would be established at the Connor Park Aerodrome to cater for the requirements of the planes flying in and out of Rockhampton as well as providing expert weather observations for general purposes. The presence of a meteorological office at Rockhampton Airport continued up until 2021 when it was announced it would soon be closed - a decision that has prompted much discussion.

During World War II, facilities at the airport were substantially upgraded. The size of the facility was doubled by the resumption and purchase of additional land. A new runway was constructed at a length of 1,250 yards and bitumen was laid in an attempt to reduce the dust which was being stirred up by propellers causing inconvenience to passengers and risking interference with the instruments at the meteorological office. The Commonwealth took over control of the airport, and the Royal Australian Air Force moved in. An Aeradio station was established to enable air ground communication, a facility that survived as a Flight Service Unit until 1992. Control Tower facilities were also established. At one stage, work was commenced to allow rapid demolition of the runways if required.

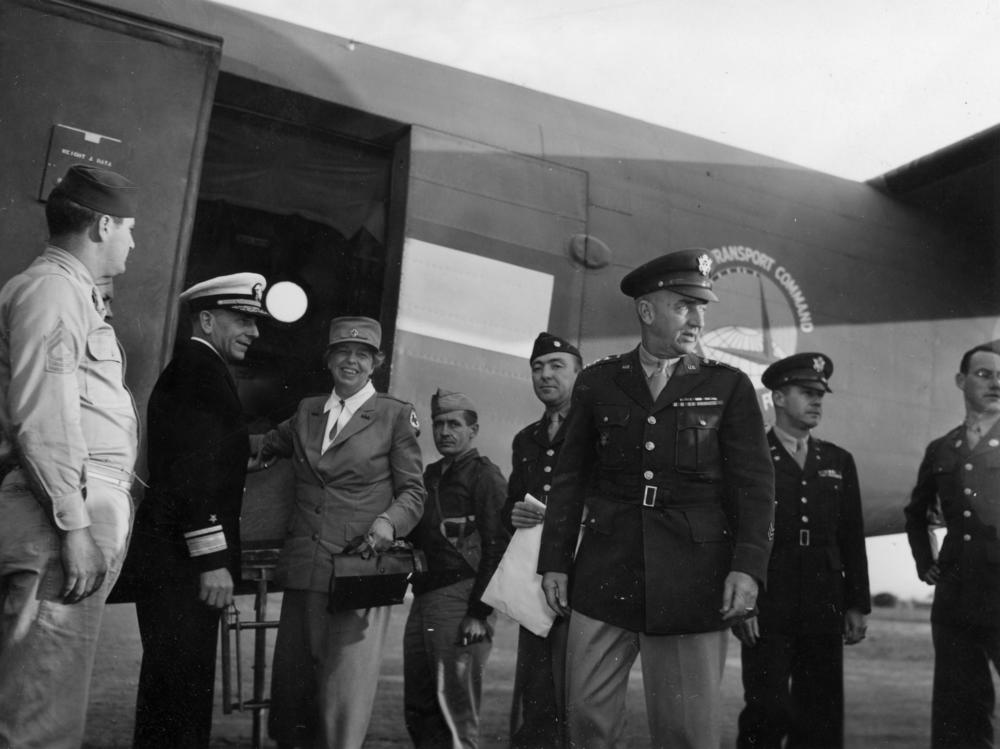
Eleanor Roosevelt arriving at Connor Park Aerodrome, 1943

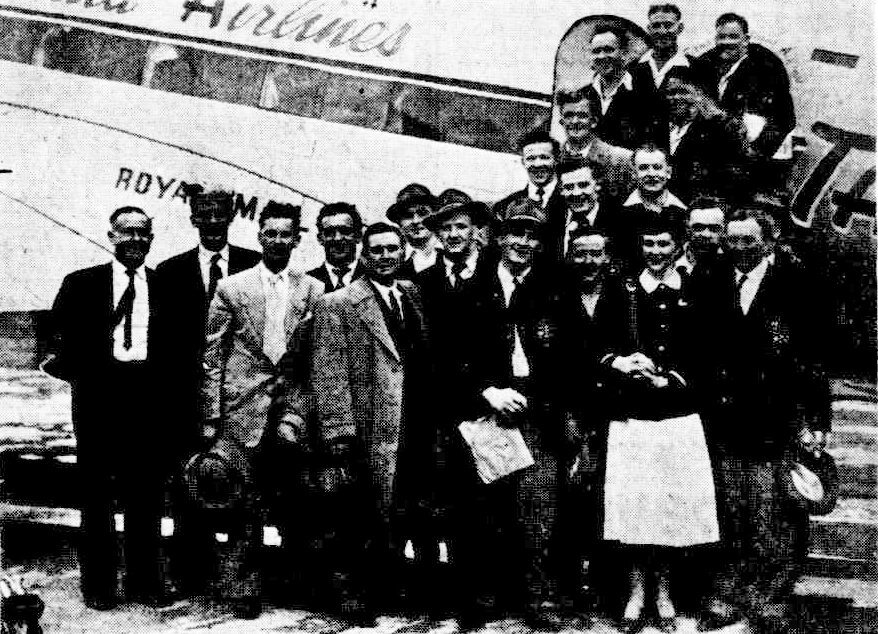
Great Britain Lions players at Connor Park, 1954

The opening of the Connor Park Aerodrome provided much easier access to Rockhampton not only for the general public but for many visiting dignitaries, prompting a steady stream of royalty, political leaders, sporting personalities, high-ranking military figures and well known aviators to visit the city. Those greeted at the Connor Park Aerodrome in its early years included Sir Charles Kingsford Smith, Eleanor Roosevelt, Prince Henry, Duke of Gloucester, Sir William McKell, Richard Casey, Baron Casey, Robert L. Eichelberger, Queen Elizabeth II, Prince Philip, Duke of Edinburgh and the Great Britain national rugby league team. Many other notable arrivals have landed at Rockhampton Airport, since including Johnny Cash in 1981. After visiting the city in 1954, Prince Philip returned to Rockhampton Airport in 1973 when he landed at the controls of a RAF Queen's Flight Andover on 9 October 1973. He was en route to New Zealand after a three-day camping tour near Alice Springs.

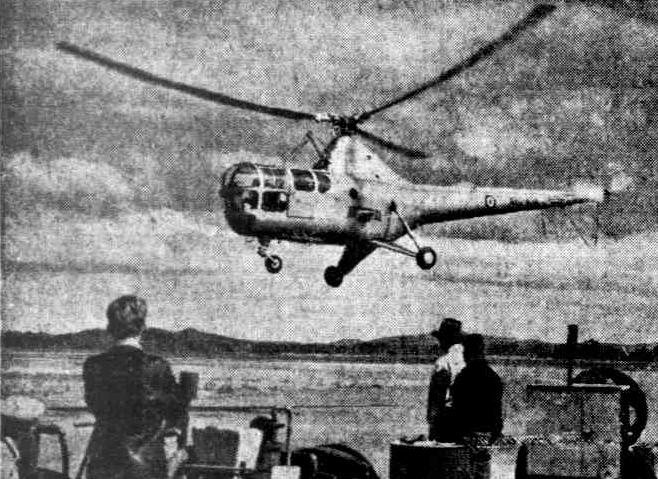
An RAAF Sikorsky S-51 becomes the first helicopter to land at Connor Park, 1952.

The first helicopter to land at Rockhampton Airport arrived unannounced on 9 July 1952 when a RAAF Sikorsky S-51 flew over the city before landing at the airport to refuel. It had flown from Brisbane via Bundaberg and was on its way north to Mackay and Townsville. The draft from the rotor blades whipped up a large cloud of dust which covered a freshly painted restroom building much to the frustration of the tradesmen who had just finished the job.

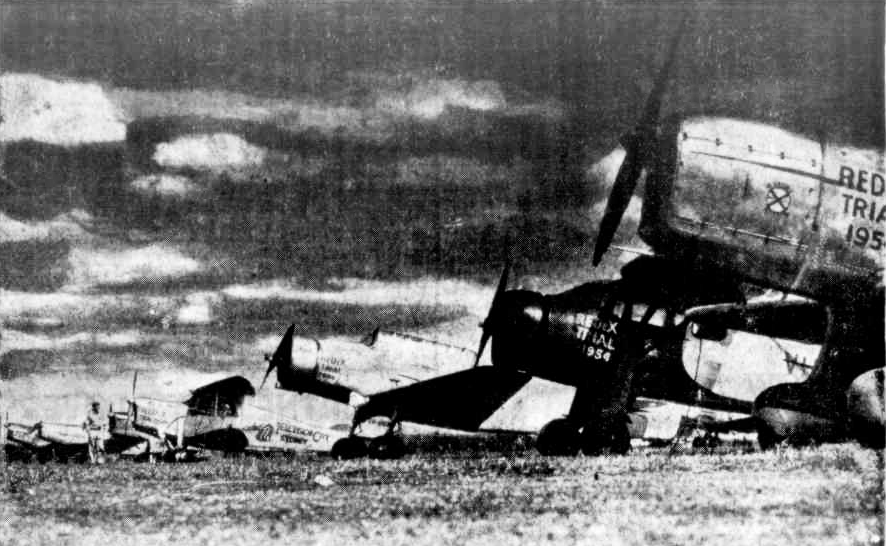
Planes competing in the Redex Air Reliability Trial at Connor Park, 1954

The Connor Park Aerodrome played host to 27 planes competing in the 1954 Redex Air Reliability Trial, an air version of the long-distance motorsport rally. The first section of planes competing in the trial arrived at Connor Park on 2 August 1954, with the second section arriving on 7 August 1954. The arrival of the planes attracted a considerable amount of sightseers to the airport, although fog delayed the arrival of the second section of competing aircraft.

In 1965, Ansett-ANA and TAA both introduced special tourist air fares to Rockhampton Airport, a decision which was met with criticism in Canberra after the two company's claimed tourist air fares to Canberra weren't viable despite Rockhampton Airport recording a total of 43,368 passengers in 1963 compared to the 236,255 passengers handled by Canberra Airport in the same period.

Porters at Rockhampton Airport foiled an elaborate plan by five men to steal $600,000 in cash from the Reserve Bank of Australia mid-flight from four separate planes across Queensland in what became known as "The Great Plane Robbery" during 1982. Just before 11am on 21 September 1982, the cargo section of a TAA aircraft was opened after it had landed at Rockhampton. Porters noticed a hand appear from behind one of the freight boxes, and the police were contacted. At first the man was thought to be a stowaway, but the freight box the man was found in contained $200,000 in $20 and $5 notes which were destined for local branches of the Commonwealth Bank. The man was Lance James Woolcock who had swapped the cash for phone books. Upon being discovered, Woolcock attempted to escape but after running down the runway, he was captured by a porter and a pilot. Although a small breathing tube had been installed in his box, Woolcock appeared to be suffering from air sickness and oxygen deprivation from being in the cargo hold of the aircraft. It was soon discovered, Woolcock was just one member of a team. Further men were found in freight boxes in Mount Isa, Townsville and Brisbane. Robert Davies and John Bower were found in Townsville (one in the box, the other found waiting near a cargo depot), John Stewart Anthony was found in a freight box in Brisbane (after his box destined for Cairns was accidentally left behind) while notorious criminal Robert "Bertie" Kidd was found in Mount Isa. All men were arrested and charged with conspiracy and theft. Kidd was thought to be the organiser and was sentenced to four years imprisonment. The other men received less severe punishments. According to police, all men were "well known identities" with links to the Painters and Dockers Union. Police believed the men had attempted the heist after receiving insider information from either the Reserve Bank, TAA or a security firm.

In 1984, with the construction underway of the new Iwasaki Sangyo international resort on the Capricorn Coast north of Yeppoon, the company pushed the Federal Government to grant "international" status to Rockhampton Airport or to allow international charter flights to land at the airport on a regular basis. The company wasn't successful in their bid to have the airport upgraded to international status.

In 1988 during upgrade work, the demolition tunnels installed in 1940 were located and filled in.

In February 1989, Rockhampton City Council was vested with ownership of the airport.

In 1995, the Royal Flying Doctor Service established a nice base at Rockhampton Airport. In 2015, the service egearly celebrated the 25th anniversary of the base which coincided with the opening of a new patient transfer facility which was unveiled by CEO of RFDS Queensland, Nino Di Marco. On 26 January1996, the Capricorn Helicopter Rescue Service commenced operations with their first hangar officially opened by Merri Rose on 20 February 1999.

In March 2010, it was announced Jetstar would be withdrawing services from Rockhampton on 9 May 2010. The company blamed Rockhampton Regional Council for not being able to secure a competitive and long-term pricing arrangement. As a result, QantasLink boosted their capacity with an extra 47 weekly return services between Brisbane and Rockhampton, while Tigerair Australia offered $28 fares on their services between the two cities.

Tigerair Australia established routes Rockhampton soon after the airline's launch. In 2008, a Tigerair flight suffered a bird strike while landing at Rockhampton. Whole the aircraft was not damaged, the airline had no local engineers available to inspect the plane and one would need to travel from Melbourne, prompting an almost 12-hour delay. A furore erupted when the aircraft took-off three hours prior to its amended departure time. Passengers were not advised of the earlier departure and 55 were left behind, despite the attempts of an airport staff member reportedly attempting to physically prevent the plane taking off on the tarmac. The airline said that they were required to depart at that time to prevent a staff member on board from going over her monthly working limit and that they had attempted to contact all passengers. Rockhampton Regional Council mayor Brad Carter criticised the airline for the incident and said the way that they had handled it was "totally unacceptable." Tigerair said that they would refund all affected customers. They also said they would pay for alternate flights where possible and gifted all affected passengers with a $200 voucher. In 2011, Tigerair Australia suspended flights during the 2010–2011 floods which temporarily closed Rockhampton Airport. They resumed services on 29 March 2011 with the company celebrating a milestone of having the 100,000th customer to go through Rockhampton Airport. However, several months later, the company said that they would be cutting flights to both Rockhampton and Mackay from 1 August 2011. The airline said that despite the routes being very popular, they would only return once the company had achieved more reliability in its other operations.

A new twin-bay hangar for the Capricorn Helicopter Rescue Service was officially opened by federal MP Michelle Landry and state MP Barry O'Rourke on 14 March 2018. The executive director of the service Mark Fewtrell said the new facility was much needed as the service had long outgrown their previous hangar. He said the new complex would meet the needs of a growing population and projected industry demands while finally allowing all staff to work under the same roof after some were forced to temporarily work from an office in the CBD.

JetGo flights to and from Rockhampton Airport were suspended on 1 June 2018 when the company went into voluntary administration. Rockhampton Regional Council described the announcement as "incredibly disappointing to Rockhampton." Jetgo's first flight from Rockhampton Airport was made on 28 September 2015 on its newly introduced Townsville to Gold Coast (via Rockhampton) service. In December 2015, the company stated that their expansion to Rockhampton had proved successful with the Townsville to Rockhampton section of the route particularly well patronised.

After experiencing a gradual downward trend from a peak of over 700,000 passengers each year during the mining boom between 2010 and 2012, passenger numbers using Rockhampton Airport increased by 3.6% in 2019, prior to the COVID-19 pandemic.

With military exercises regularly held in the Shoalwater Bay Military Training Area, military aircraft are a common sight at Rockhampton Airport. Following a fatal accident at Shoalwater Bay in 1981, the RAAF's fleet of Iroquois helicopters were grounded. The RAAF Chinook helicopters then lifted the Iroquois helicopters from Shoalwater Bay and dropped them at Rockhampton Airport where they were dismantled and loaded into C130 Hercules to be transported to RAAF Base Amberley. In 1995, it was announced that British Aerospace had won a $7 million contract with Singapore which would include building a facility at Rockhampton Airport to manage and maintain the Singapore Armed Forces' military vehicles.

A guard of honour was formed at Rockhampton Airport on 19 September 2017 by the Singapore Armed Force personnel as the coffin containing the body of 21-year-old Third Sergeant Chan Hiang Cheng Gavin was loaded from a hearse onto a Republic of Singapore Air Force Boeing KC-135R Stratotanker '752' to be transported back to Singapore where he was accorded a funeral with full military honours. 3SG Chen had died in a vehicular incident in the Shoalwater Bay Training Area while participating in Exercise Wallaby.

== Past and future redevelopments ==
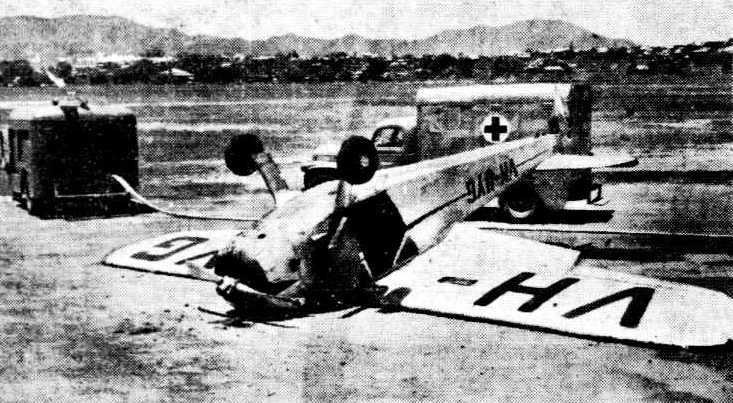
An overturned Cessna at Connor Park, 1948

Rockhampton Airport is prone to closures when the Fitzroy River reaches major flood levels due to the airport's close proximity to the Pink Lily meander where significant overbank flow occurs during major flooding events. Rockhampton Airport has been closed several times due to floodwaters impacting the runways including in 1954, 1991, 2011 and 2017. This prompted a proposal put forward by federal MP Kirsten Livermore to relocate the airport to Hedlow, between Rockhampton and Yeppoon.

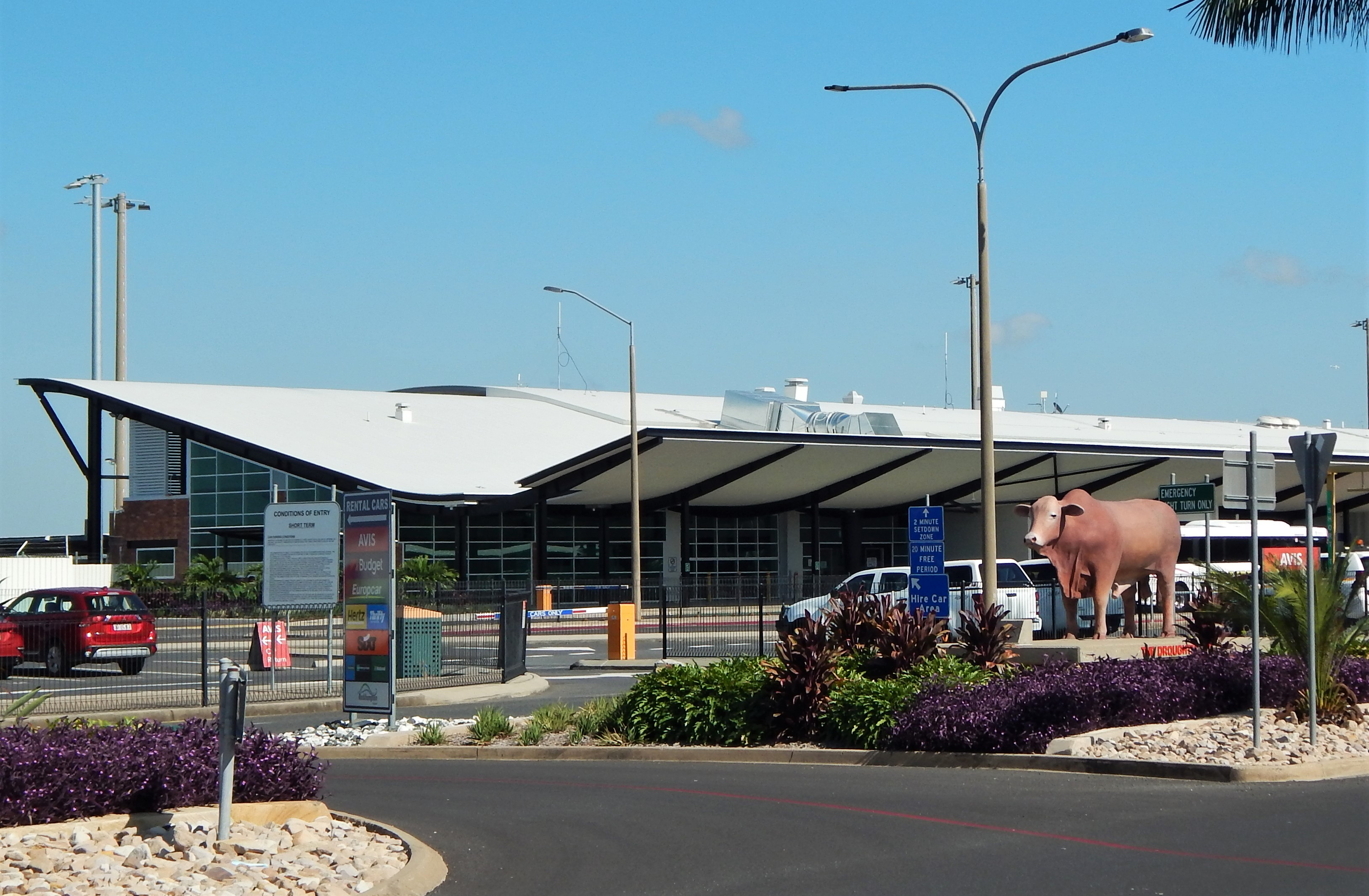
Rockhampton Airport Terminal, 2022

In 2008, Rockhampton Airport completed an A$8.4 million terminal redevelopment. Changes made during the renovation included the removal of the old viewing deck, a new security screening point and departure lounge, a new café/restaurant, the relocation of the airport offices, check-in counters, and baggage carousel and a customs screening point for international flights. During 2008, changes that occurred at the airport included the installation of new air-conditioners and lighting.

Throughout 2020 and 2021, the terminal underwent another substantial upgrade. Stage one of the $41 million refurbishment commenced in April 2020. New body scanners and body screening equipment was installed and the airport was reconfigured to allow better passenger movement through the terminal. Private airline lounges, a FIFO hub, additional retail and hospitality businesses were introduced and existing amenities were updated. With flights cancelled during the COVID-19 pandemic, the work progresses faster than anticipated.

In September 2021, Alliance Airlines announced it would be relocating its repair, maintenance and overhaul work to Rockhampton with a new $60 million facility to be constructed at Rockhampton Airport.

== Airlines and destinations ==
| Airlines | Destinations |
|---|---|
| Alliance Airlines | Brisbane |
| QantasLink | Brisbane, Cairns, Mackay, Townsville |
| Virgin Australia | Brisbane |

== Accidents and incidents ==
- A Cessna C-34 overturned upon landing at Connor Park Aerodrome on 20 February 1948. The pilot and his two passengers managed to escape the aircraft with only minor injuries. The plane which was arriving from Emerald slewed over on its starboard wing, ground looped and overturned shattering the cabin windows, bending the propeller and denting the engine cowling. Fire crews at the airport had just completed a fire drill and quickly responded to the incident.

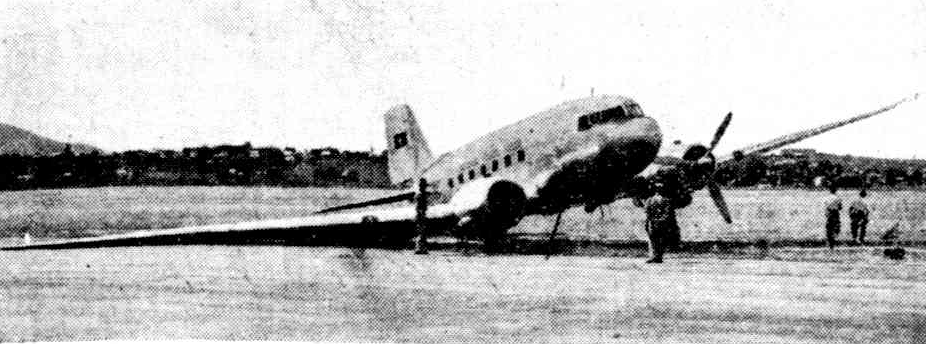
A damaged Australian National Airways plane after a hard landing at Connor Park, 1948

- On 13 April 1948, an Australian National Airways Douglas aircraft sustained considerable damage when it was involved in a hard landing and subsequent loss of control. After landing heavily, a strong gust of wind caused the left wing to rise and the right wing hit the ground, breaking off the wheel and propeller on that side. The plane veered to the left, skidding approximately 100 yards. During the crash sequence, the loose propeller tore a large hole in the fuselage below the pilot's cabin.
- In 1975, a 17-year-old boy with no flying experience faced court for allegedly stealing a Piper Commanche aircraft owned by Overland Airways from Rockhampton Airport on 27 February 1975. He was charged with having unlawfully flown an aircraft without a license and operating an aircraft in a reckless manner. The boy allegedly told police he wanted to "fly home to New Guinea" so took a plane from the airport, learning how to operate it as he went. He allegedly managed to take off and climb to 2000 feet before descending due to poor visibility caused by rain. He allegedly lowered the aircraft to 200 feet to read a road sign due to not being able to use the onboard compasses. He allegedly landed the plane on an airstrip at Alligator Creek south of Mackay, damaging a wing as he did so.
- A Darwin-based RAAF sergeant who was participating in the Talisman Sabre military exercise suffered third-degree burns to his upper body when the portaloo he was using at Rockhampton Airport exploded on 25 July 2011. It was believed a lit cigarette triggered the explosion. He was flown to Brisbane for specialist treatment but died from his injuries on 20 September 2011.

== Operations ==
Busiest domestic routes out of Rockhampton Airport (in 2013–2014)
| Rank | Airport | Passengers carried | % change | Airline carriers |
|---|---|---|---|---|
| 1 | Queensland, Brisbane Airport | no data yet | no data yet | Virgin Australia, Qantaslink |
| 2 | Queensland, Gold Coast Airport | no data yet | no data yet | JETGO Australia |
| 2 | Queensland, Cairns Airport | no data yet | no data yet | Qantaslink |
| 2 | Queensland, Townsville Airport | no data yet | no data yet | JETGO Australia, Qantaslink |
| 2 | Queensland, Mackay Airport | no data yet | no data yet | Qantaslink |

== Ground transport ==
The terminal is also serviced by bus and taxi, with regular connections to Rockhampton City and the Capricorn Coast provided by Young's Bus Service and other local operators.

== Awards ==
Rockhampton Airport was named the 2007 Australian Major Airport of the Year at the prestigious National Awards in recognition of Excellence in Australian Aviation, in Melbourne on 13 November 2007.

== Statues ==
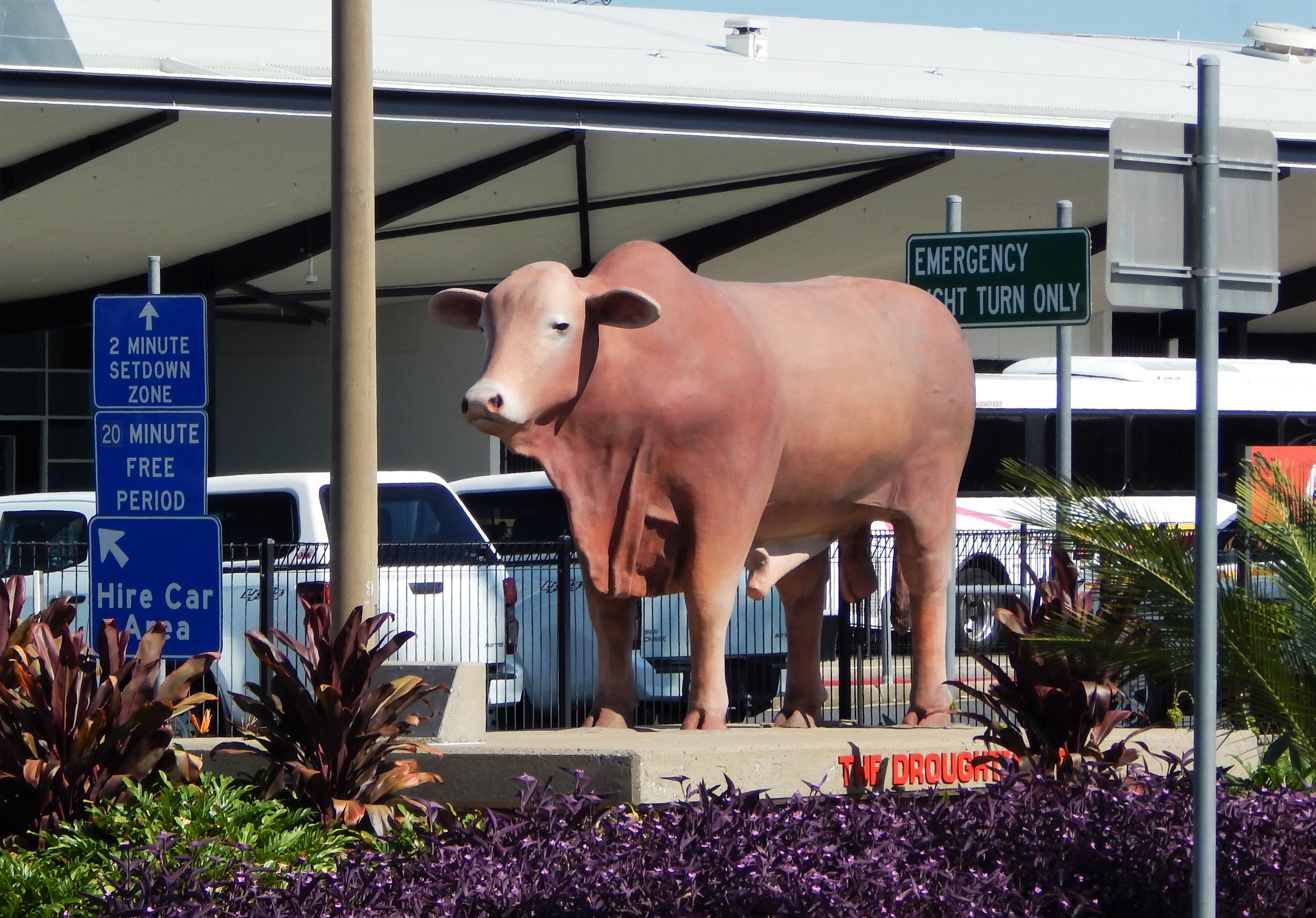
The Big Bull statue at Rockhampton Airport, 2022

=== Big Bulls ===
On the roundabout outside the airport is one of the seven Big Bulls statues that decorate Rockhampton, which regards itself as the Beef Capital of Australia. The statue outside the airport depicts a Droughtmaster bull, an important breed in the local area. The Big Bulls are listed as one of Australia's big things.

The theft of the testicles from the bulls is a common prank and they frequently have to be replaced. Some residents also feel that the bull statues overemphasise one aspect of the city and should be relocated to less prominent locations. However, there is strong public support for the retention of the bulls.

=== Merlion ===
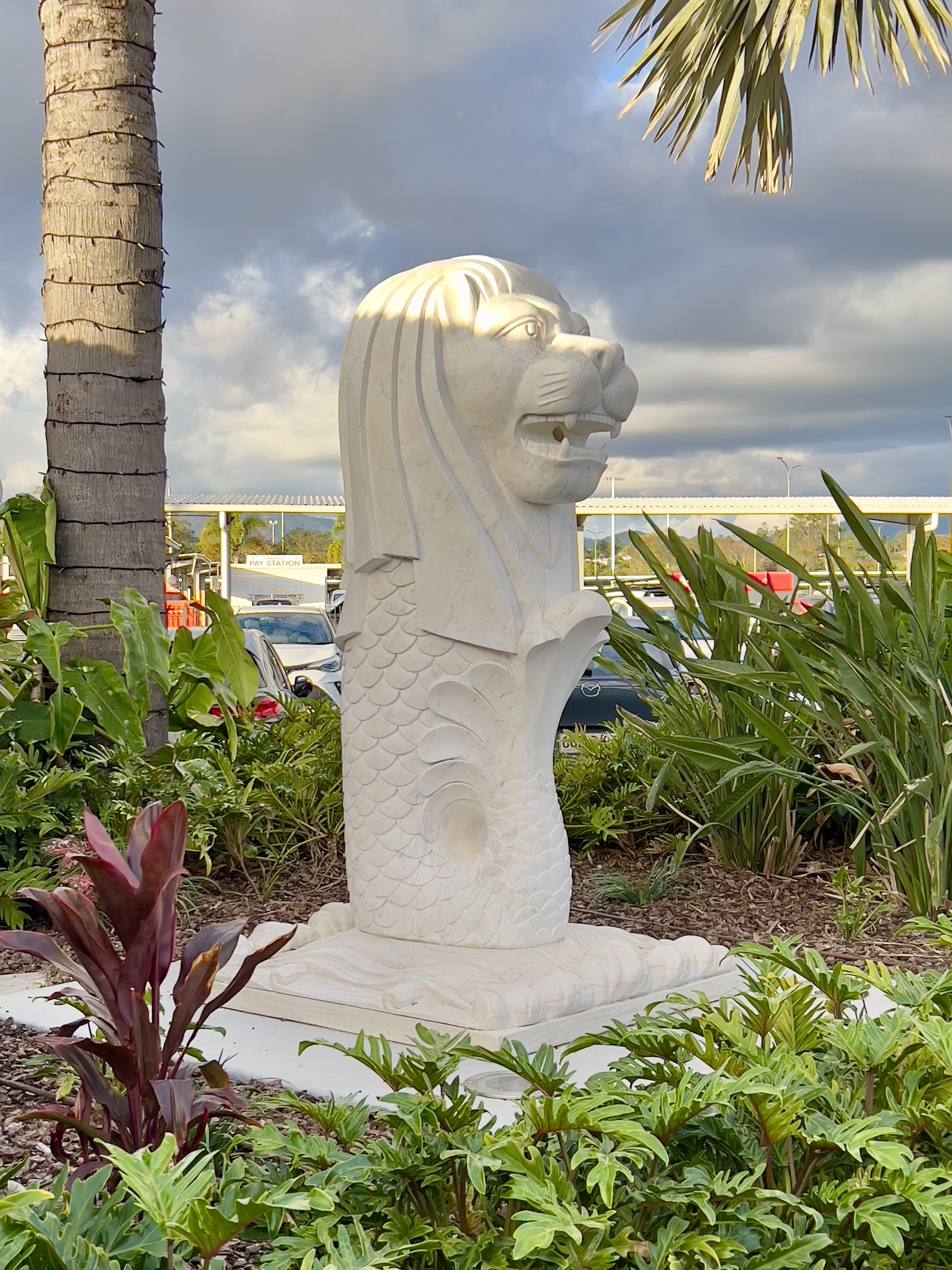
The Merlion statue at Rockhampton Airport, 2023

A Merlion statue is located outside the terminal, serving as a symbol of the close bilateral ties between Australia and Singapore. The Merlion is the national mascot of Singapore. The monument commemorates the long-standing relationship established through the Singapore Armed Forces (SAF)'s use of the nearby Shoalwater Bay Training Area for the annual Exercise Wallaby.

== Library ==
The Rockhampton Regional Council operate a public library at Rockhampton Airport called the "Anytime Library" (which, as at 2018, is open from 5am to 9:30pm every day).

== See also ==
- List of airports in Queensland
