= Wandal, Queensland =

Wandal
- Suburb
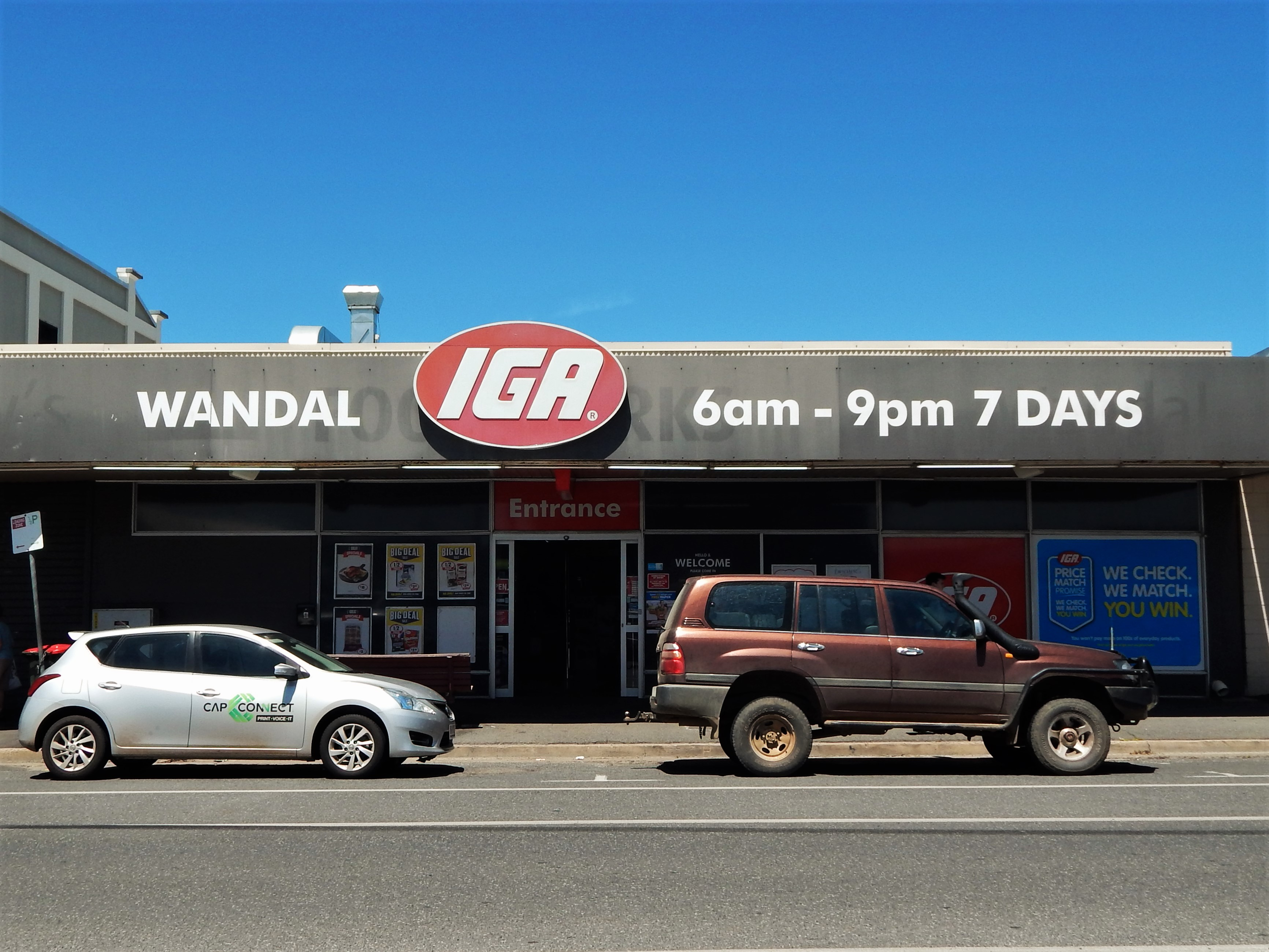
- IGA supermarket in Wandal, 2020

- Interactive map of Wandal
- Coordinates: 23.3711°S 150.4938°E
- Country: Australia
- State: Queensland
- City: Rockhampton
- LGA: Rockhampton Region
- Location: 1.8 km (1.1 mi) NNW of Rockhampton CBD; 646 km (401 mi) NNW of Brisbane

Government
  - State electorate: Rockhampton
  - Federal division: Capricornia

Area
  - Total: 3.2 km^{2} (1.2 sq mi)

Population
  - Total: 3,949 (2021 census)
  - Density: 1,234/km^{2} (3,200/sq mi)
- Time zone: UTC+10:00 (AEST)
- Postcode: 4700
Suburbs around Wandal
Pink Lily	Kawana	Park Avenue
West Rockhampton	Wandal	Park Avenue
West Rockhampton	The Range	Rockhampton City

Wandal is a suburb of Rockhampton in the Rockhampton Region, Queensland, Australia. In the 2021 census, Wandal had a population of 3,949 people.

== Geography ==
Wandal is situated about four kilometres north-west of the central business district.

== History ==
The area was originally surveyed in the 1860s, shortly after the town of Rockhampton was laid out and was originally the location of several large estates built by wealthy Rockhamptonites, particularly W.H. Wiseman, John Jardine, William Knox D'Arcy and P.F. MacDonald. Closer suburban development occurred later in the nineteenth century and into the early twentieth century.

The Hall School, the local primary school, was established for Girls and Infants in 1910.

The Sisters of St Joseph of the Sacred Heart opened a Catholic primary school called St Joseph's School in 1912 or on 24 January 1916.

The Rockhampton State High School, which was built in Exhibition Road in 1961. At that time the High School was connected with the Rockhampton Technical College, but the School and the Tech separated in 1962.

Leichhardt Ward School, a Boys' School, closed in 1987 and was combined with The Hall State School.

== Demographics ==
In the 2006 census, Wandal had a population of 4,188 people.

In the 2016 census, Wandal had a population of 4,014 people.

In the 2021 census, Wandal had a population of 3,949 people.

== Education ==
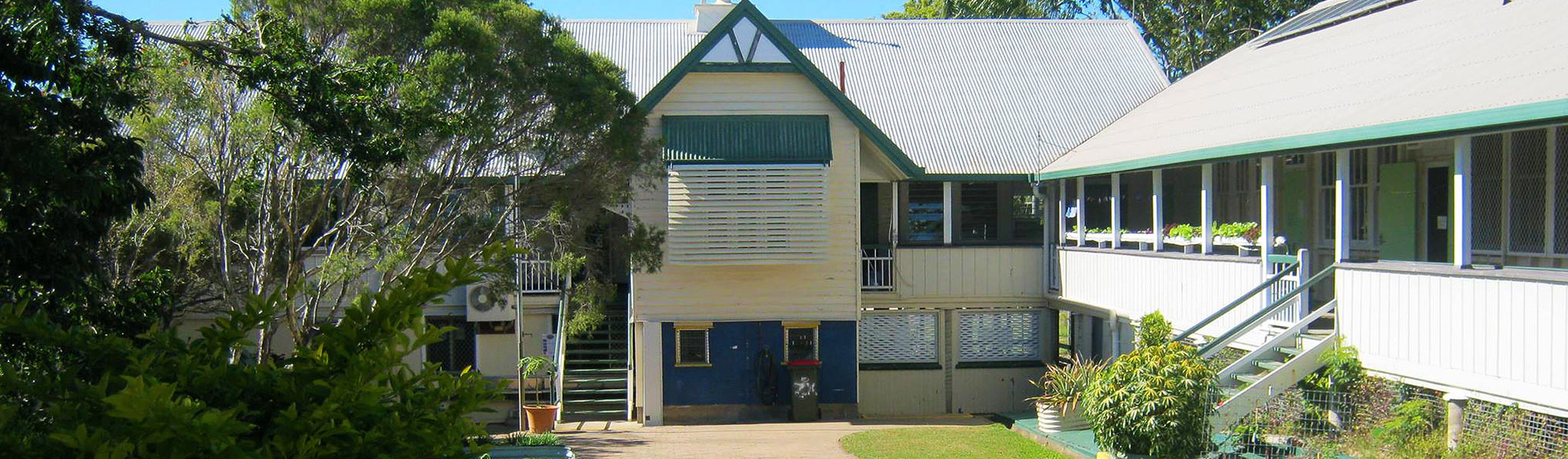
The Hall State School, 2025

The Hall State School is a government primary (Prep–6) school for boys and girls at Murray Street (23.3733°S 150.4967°E). In 2018, the school had an enrolment of 322 students with 30 teachers (27 full-time equivalent) and 21 non-teaching staff (14 full-time equivalent). It includes a special education program.

St Joseph's Catholic Primary School is a Catholic primary (Prep–6) school for boys and girls at 4 Herbert Street (23.3729°S 150.4940°E). In 2018, the school had an enrolment of 289 students with 21 teachers (17 full-time equivalent) and 16 non-teaching staff (9 full-time equivalent).

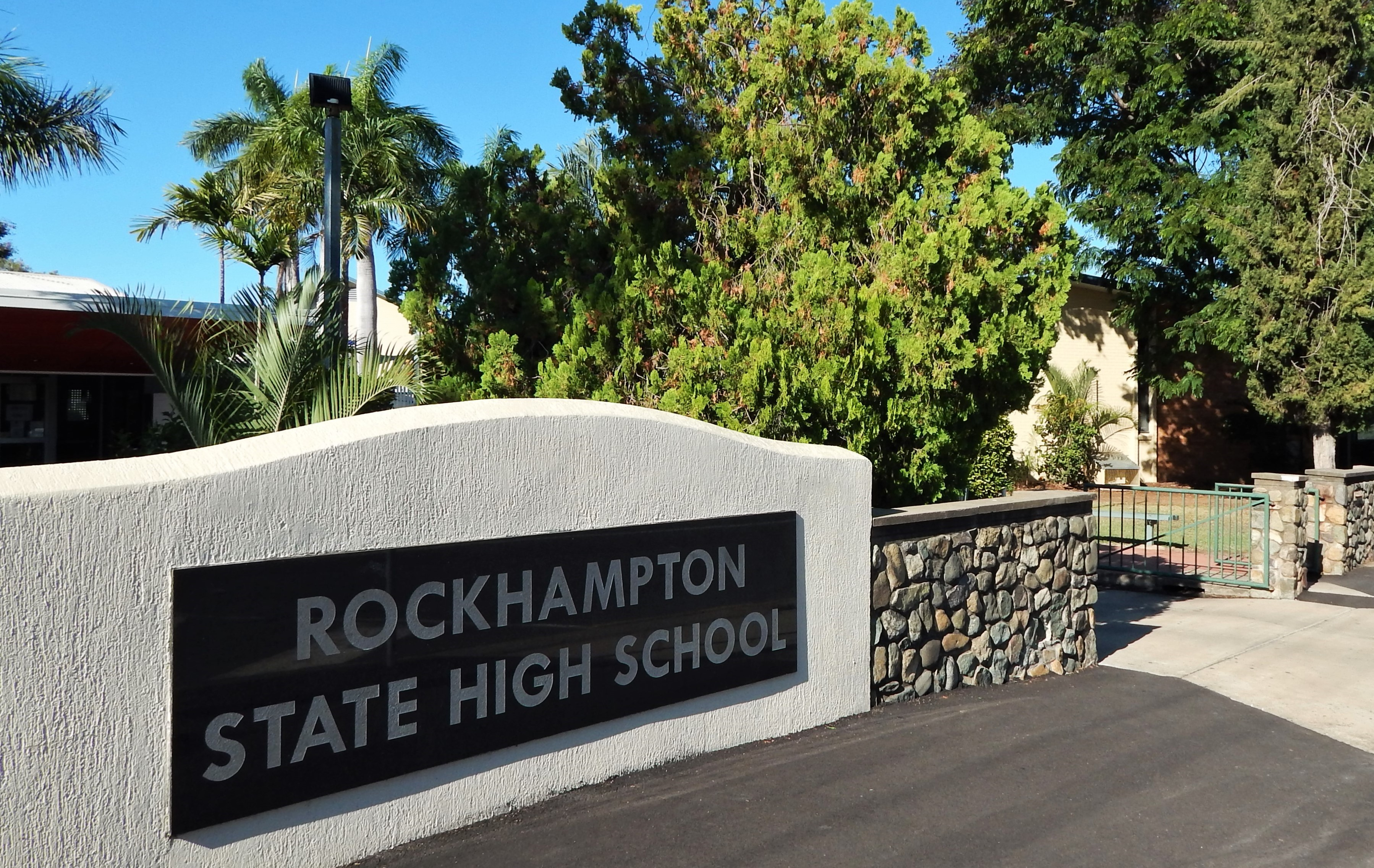
Rockhampton State High School, 2020

Rockhampton State High School is a government secondary (7–12) school for boys and girls at Campbell Street (23.3695°S 150.4992°E). In 2018, the school had an enrolment of 1098 students with 93 teachers (89 full-time equivalent) and 51 non-teaching staff (38 full-time equivalent). It includes a special education program.

Rockhampton Positive Learning Centre is a specific-purpose secondary (8–12) school at Murray Street (23.3733°S 150.4967°E). It supports children requiring intervention beyond what can be provided in a conventional classroom. The school's aim is to return the student to a conventional school or to establish them in vocational training.

== Amenities ==
Wandal is also the location of the Rockhampton Showgrounds, the Exhibition Grounds belonging to the Rockhampton Agricultural Society.

Viti Wesleyan Methodist Church is at 35 Rundle Street (23.3727°S 150.4964°E). It is part of the Wesleyan Methodist Church.
