= North Rockhampton State High School =

Location
- Berserker Street; North Rockhampton, Queensland, 4701; Australia; 23.3521°S 150.5316°E

Information
- Type: State secondary day school
- Motto: Latin: Fidem Praestare Memento (Remember to Keep Your Faith)
- Established: 1956
- Authority: Department of Education (Queensland)
- Principal: Kurt Goodwin
- Deputy Principals: Jacalean Wines (Year 7 & 8); Lucy Ferrara (Year 9 & 10); Amanda Pearce (Year 11 & 12)
- Staff: 81 (Teaching); 42 (Non-teaching)
- Year levels: Year 7 – Year 12
- Gender: Coeducational
- Enrolment: 968 (August 2025)
- Area: 26 acres (0.1052 km^{2})
- Website: northrockhamptonshs.eq.edu.au

North Rockhampton State High School, colloquially known as 'North Rocky', is a co-educational State High School at Beserker Street, Frenchville, Rockhampton (Queensland, Australia), in the Central Queensland region of that state.

== History ==
North Rockhampton State High School was founded on 23 January 1956, initially renting rooms from two churches and a nearby business when the school buildings were not completed in time for the start of the school year. In 1970s, the school was the second largest state high school in Queensland.

== Administration ==
The school has a teaching staff of 81 (Full-time equivalent: 79.4) and a non-teaching staff of 42 (Full-time equivalent: 34.5).

The first principal of the school when it opened in 1956 was Victor G. Honour. As of 2026, the current principal is Kurt Goodwin. Recent principals have included:

Previous School Principals
Principal	Tenure			
Principal	Initial Year	Ref	Final Year	Ref
Kurt Goodwin	2020		Current	
Janet Young	2015		2019	
Judith Newman	2007		2014	
P. O'Beirne	1996		2006	
L. Ferguson	1992		1995	
G.J. Williams	1988		1991	
B. Kehoe	1979		1987	
P. MacDonald	1976		1978	
A.G. Matthews	1975		1975	
E.K. Haughton	1971		1974	
C.J.R. Spall	1970		1968	
A.F. Pembleton	1964		1967	
D.J. Watson	1958		1963	
Victor G. Honour	1956		1957	

== Students ==
=== Years ===
The school caters for Year 7 to Year 12 Queensland secondary schools started catering for year 7 to align Queensland with the other states, as part of the official implementation in 2015 of Anna Bligh's state-wide "Flying Start" program. As part of a 2013 trial, some schools implemented this transition early.

=== Enrolments ===
The trend in school enrolments (August figures) has been:-

Trend in enrolment figures
Year	Years (7 – 12)						Boys	Girls	Total	Ref
Year	7	8	9	10	11	12	Boys	Girls	Total	Ref
2010	-	-	-	-	-	-	456	478	934	
2011	-	-	-	-	-	-	439	467	906	
2012	-	-	-	-	-	-	463	476	939	
2013	-	-	-	-	-	-	451	438	889	
2014	-	-	-	-	-	-	454	420	874	
2015	-	-	-	-	-	-	518	452	970	
2016	-	-	-	-	-	-	480	426	906	
2017	-	-	-	-	-	-	472	439	911	
2018	-	-	-	-	-	-	431	439	870	
2019	-	-	-	-	-	-	450	445	895	
2020	161	179	180	173	141	93	462	465	927	
2021	187	169	159	161	139	108	481	442	923	
2022	190	180	160	152	155	103	485	455	940	
2023	162	186	181	177	144	124	490	484	974	
2024	130	158	179	210	161	141	498	481	979	
2025	145	138	157	197	190	141	506	462	968	
2026	TBA	TBA	TBA	TBA	TBA	TBA	TBA	TBA	TBA	

== Cultural Diversity ==
=== Indigenous ===
The school is located on traditional lands of the Darumbal people.

=== Multiculturalism ===
The recent trends in multicultural composition been:

Multicultural composition trends
Year	Indigenous	LBOTE	Ref
2014	15%	7%	
2015	18%	8%	
2016	19%	8%	
2017	22%	9%	
2018	24%	10%	
2019	24%	10%	
2020	26%	10%	
2021	25%	10%	
2022	24%	10%	
2023	26%	10%	
2024	28%	11%	
2025	32	13%	
2026	TBA	TBA	

== Sports ==
=== Houses ===
The school's five sports houses are named after geography and historical explorers significant to the local area:

Sports Houses
House Name	Geography and historical explorers	Mascot	Colour	Ref
Archer	Archer brothers, Explorers and pastoralists	Pegasus	Red	
Berserker	Berserker Range named after Norse “Berserkers”	Warrior	Blue	
Fitzroy	Fitzroy River named after Governor Charles Augustus FitzRoy.	Falcon	Green	
Keppel	Keppel Bay named after Admiral Augustus Keppel	Cobra	Yellow	

=== Competition ===
Every year, North Rocky High holds Interhouse Athletics and Swimming Carnivals. Before Easter, the school holds an Interhouse Cross-Country day at Kemp Beach on the Capricorn Coast.

== Notable alumni ==
Notable alumni
Alumni	Notoriety	Ref
Steve Baxter	Australian entrepreneur, known for his work at PIPE Networks, StartupAUS and River City Labs, is now a 'shark' on Network Ten reality television series, Shark Tank, which is based on the international Dragons' Den format.	
Jamie Dwyer	Field hockey player and Olympic gold medalist: 2004 Athens (Mens Field Hockey) - Gold; 2008 Beijing (Mens Field Hockey) - Bronze; 2012 London (Mens Field Hockey) - Bronze	
Mark Knowles	Field hockey player and Olympic gold medalist: 2004 Athens (Mens Field Hockey) - Gold; 2008 Beijing (Mens Field Hockey) - Bronze; 2012 London (Mens Field Hockey) - Bronze	
Craig Zonca	Australian radio broadcaster, was presenter of ABC Local Radio's long-running rural affairs program, The Queensland Country Hour from 2013 until 2016. In December 2016, he was announced as Spencer Howson's replacement as breakfast presenter on 612 ABC Brisbane.	

== See also ==
- List of schools in Central Queensland
- Education in Queensland
- History of state education in Queensland
- List of schools in Queensland
- Lists of schools in Australia
