= Loretta Ryan =

Australian radio presenter

- Born: 1965 (age 60–61); Brisbane, Queensland, Australia
- Occupations: radio presenter, journalist
- Years active: 1983 to present
- Known for: presenting radio programs on Brisbane radio
- Notable work: 4BH Breakfast, 4BC Breakfast, ABC Radio Brisbane Breakfast

Loretta Ryan (born 1965) is an Australian radio presenter and is best known for co-hosting breakfast programs on 4BH, 4BC and ABC Radio Brisbane. She has co-hosted Breakfast on ABC Radio Brisbane with Craig Zonca since 2018.

== Career ==
After finishing school, Ryan worked at David Jones before commencing work as an advertising schedules clerk at Radio Ten in 1983.

Ryan eventually moved into production, becoming a producer for Billy J. Smith, before securing a cadetship in the newsroom, which led to Ryan's first on-air role. Ryan remained at the station during the station's various rebrands, including Stereo Ten, Brisbane's 1008, Light and Easy 1008, and back to its original callsign 4IP in 1989.

When the station changed its format to becoming a racing station 4TAB, Ryan left and went to Triple M Brisbane, where she stayed for 16 years where she read the news, ultimately becoming the station's news director, and hosted the drive program Blood, Sweat and Beers in the late 1990s.

She then moved to 4BH to co-host the breakfast show in 2006 before moving to 4BC to host the afternoon program.

At 4BC, she eventually became the co-host of the station's breakfast program with Ian Skippen in 2014.

Ryan, Skippen and many other on-air personalities were sacked from 4BC in 2015 when the station decided to network the majority of its content from its sister station in Sydney, 2GB rather than have local presenters following the merger of Fairfax Media and the Macquarie Radio Network.

After being sacked from 4BC, Ryan initially joined ABC Radio Brisbane in 2015 as a producer before becoming the presenter of the regional drive program in 2016 and then Weekends presenter in 2018.

In late 2018, Ryan was named as the co-host of Breakfast, replacing Rebecca Levingston, who moved to Mornings after one year of co-hosting the new two-presenter Breakfast format.

Ryan has also appeared on television. In 2007, she was a guest host on Extra while regular host Jillian Whiting was on maternity leave. Ryan also appeared as an extra on Paradise Beach.

== Personal life ==
Ryan is Catholic and attends mass regularly. She attended St Pius' Primary School at Banyo before attending St Rita's College at Clayfield. Ryan has admitted to feeling defensive when the Catholic Church is being attacked in the media which she says can be "very upsetting" and described some critics as "vicious".

In a 2020 interview, Ryan stated: "I'm proud to say that I'm Catholic and I've got my religion. I've gone to the Catholic schools, as I've said before, and so it's my life; it's natural for me to pray, it's natural for me to go to Church and also to treat people nicely – everything that you learn about in religion. For me that's what religion is about and I know, for myself, it's knowing (that) someone's there if I'm struggling with something or I'm worried about something, upset. I know that I can say a prayer and, I don't know, I just get some comfort out of that."

Ryan was engaged in her late 20's, but the marriage didn't take place. In 2018, Ryan said she had been single for ten years. She said she is hurt when people accuse her of being "too picky" as the reason for being single. She said she credits not being "married with three kids" as to why she has progressed so far with her radio career.

In November 2021, Ryan was targeted by scammers on Facebook who were creating fake accounts under Ryan's name to scam personal details from listeners. After one fake profile was reported to Facebook and subsequently removed, a similar fake account was created using Ryan's photos, sharing content from ABC Radio Brisbane's Facebook page and offering a fake prize. Ryan described the situation as "scary" and said she felt sorry for the listeners who were being duped.
