= The Common, Queensland =

The Common Rockhampton, Queensland
- Coordinates: 23.3825°S 150.5319°E
- Population: 0 (2021 census)
  - Density: 0.00/km^{2} (0.00/sq mi)
- Postcode(s): 4701
- Area: 5.4 km^{2} (2.1 sq mi)
- Time zone: AEST (UTC+10:00)
- Location: 3.0 km (2 mi) E of Rockhampton CBD; 617 km (383 mi) NNW of Brisbane
- LGA(s): Rockhampton Region
- State electorate(s): Rockhampton
- Federal division(s): Capricornia
Suburbs around The Common:
Berserker	Berserker	Koongal
Rockhampton City	The Common	Port Curtis
Depot Hill	Depot Hill	Port Curtis

The Common is a parkland suburb of Rockhampton in the Rockhampton Region, Queensland, Australia. In the 2021 census, The Common had "no people or a very low population".

== Geography ==
The Common is on the north side of Rockhampton, to the east of the Rockhampton central business district but separated by the Fitzoy River. It is bounded to the north by the former North Rockhampton to Emu Park railway line and to the east, south and west by the River. The Rockhampton–Emu Park Road also runs along the northern boundary.

The Devils Elbow is a reach where the Fitzroy River has a sharp bend (23.3772°S 150.5491°E) at the north-eastern corner of the suburb. Fishing Point is the southernmost part of the suburb alongside the Fitzroy River (23.3916°S 150.5347°E).

Kalka is a neighbourhood roughly within the centre of the suburb (23.3833°S 150.5333°E).

The land in the east of the suburb is somewhat marshy and undeveloped. The council landfill and sewage plant are in the northern part of the suburb with the recreational facilities in the west and south of the suburb.

== History ==
The North Rockhampton to Emu Park railway line was a branch line of the North Coast railway line. The railway allowed Rockhampton people easy access to seaside recreation at Emu Park. The railway line was officially opened on Saturday 22 December 1888 by Archibald Archer, the local Member of the Queensland Legislative Assembly for Rockhampton.

The branch line's Rockhampton terminus was the North Rockhampton railway station (23.3730°S 150.5232°E) on the north-western boundary of The Common. The former Kalka railway station was another railway station on the line (23.3735°S 150.5369°E). The line was extended over the years, and then sections progressively closed. Since 2007 the line has terminated at Lakes Creek.

The North Rockhampton Sewage Treatment Plant commenced operation in 1986.

== Demographics ==
In the 2011 census, The Common had "no people or a very low population".

In the 2016 census, The Common had "no people or a very low population".

In the 2021 census, The Common had "no people or a very low population".

== Education ==
There are no schools in The Common. The nearest government primary school is Berserker Street State School in neighbouring Berserker to the north. The nearest government secondary school is North Rockhampton State High School in Frenchville to the north.

== Facilities ==
The North Rockhampton Sewage Treatment Plant is at 108 Lakes Creek Road (23.3749°S 150.5278°E). It processes the waste water from approximately 45,000 people in addition to commercial and industrial waste papers. The treated water is discharged into the Fitzroy River downstream of the Barrage (as drinking water is taken from upstream of the Barrage).

Lakes Creek Road Landfill is at 152 Lakes Creek Road (23.3760°S 150.5359°E).

== Amenities ==
The Common contains a number of recreational facilities:

- Cyril Connell Fields in the south-west (23.3830°S 150.5240°E) offers grassed sporting fields and picnic facilities
- Callaghan Park Racecourse at 75 Reaney Street (23.3790°S 150.5254°E)
- Rockhampton Cricket Club (23.3757°S 150.5198°E)
- Norbridge Park near Fishing Point (23.3865°S 150.5291°E) offers grassed sporting fields and picnic facilities
- Fitzroy River Hack and Pony Club at 50 Reaney Street (23.3768°S 150.5181°E)

There is a boat ramp and floating walkway at Robert Clark Drive (23.3803°S 150.5204°E) for boating access to the Fitzroy River. It is managed by the Rockhampton Regional Council.
