= Mervyn Henry Stevenson =

Australian police officer (1926–2001)

- Born: 31 March 1926; Mount Morgan, Queensland
- Died: 16 December 2001
- Occupation: Police officer
- Awards: Australian Stockman's Hall of Famer

Mervyn Henry Stevenson (1926-2001) served as a Queensland police officer from 1947 until 1982. He started as a bush cop and ended up as the superintendent in charge of the Townsville Police District, though his retirement years were tainted with the spectre of corruption.

== Renowned bushman ==
Described as "the last of the corned beef and damper coppers", Stevenson made a name for himself as a horseman, cattleman and bushman. He gained notoriety in 1950 at the northern township of Coen for tracking down on horseback a group of 12 Aborigines wanted for questioning over the murder of an indigenous police boy. In 1965 he was promoted to detective sergeant and named officer-in-charge of the CIB stock squad based in Charters Towers.

== Crooked Creek Cattle Company ==
The cattle duffing racket of north Queensland police was mentioned in the Australian House of Representatives in 2006 by the Federal Member for Kennedy, Bob Katter. He referred to it as ‘the crooked creek cattle company’. He told parliament he had given evidence about it when he was a senior minister of the Queensland government. He also acknowledged the very courageous actions of ABC journalist Steve Austin, who exposed the situation.

== Disappearance of Tony Jones ==
In 1992 Townsville police published an identikit sketch of a person wanted for questioning in relation to the suspected murder of a young West Australian hitchhiker, Tony Jones, who disappeared without trace in 1982. On the night of the disappearance, the suspect, believed to be involved in the cattle industry, was allegedly dining with Jones at the Rising Sun Hotel and planning to give him a lift to Charters Towers. The Townsville Bulletin reported that the identikit sketch matched a "former policeman", whose identity was subsequently confirmed during the 2002 coronial inquest into Jones's disappearance as being none other than Mervyn Henry Stevenson.

== Australian Stockman's Hall of Fame ==
Stevenson avoided prosecution and was eventually inducted into the Australian Stockman's Hall of Fame in 2001. He died of cancer on 16 December 2001 and was farewelled by a police guard of honour at his funeral in Townsville.
