= Kelly Higgins-Devine =

Australian radio presenter

- Born: Bendigo, Victoria, Australia
- Occupation: Radio presenter
- Known for: Hosting programs on ABC Radio Brisbane
- Notable work: Afternoons; Drive; Evenings
- Spouse: Craig Devine
- Children: 1
- Awards: ABC Local Radio Broadcaster of the Year (2007); ABC Local Radio Best Use of the Medium (2011)

Kelly Higgins-Devine is an Australian radio presenter.

She is best known for her lengthy tenure hosting programs on ABC Radio Brisbane, a career which began in the ABC Brisbane newsroom in 1999, and switched to Local Radio as a presenter in 2003.

== Early life ==
Growing up in Victoria, Higgins-Devine was born in Bendigo. Her father, Shane Higgins joined the army and Higgins-Devine moved between Sydney, Townsville, Singapore, Adelaide and Melbourne. She attended Kildara College in Malvern before completing Year 12 at Mt Maria College in the Brisbane suburb of Mitchelton in 1985.

As a high school student, Higgins-Devine completed work experience in the newsroom of a Melbourne radio station.

== Career ==
In 1993, she completed a Commercial Radio Training course at Swinburne University of Technology, after which she worked at regional commercial stations in Charleville, Cairns and Shepparton.

Moving to Brisbane, Higgins-Devine worked as a weekend newsreader at 4KQ in 1996 before becoming a newsreader at 4BC in 1997. She joined ABC NewsRadio in 1999 before becoming a news presenter and journalist at ABC Radio Brisbane.

In 2004, Higgins-Devine became a program presenter and has since hosted a number of programs including Afternoons, Drive and Evenings. Higgins-Devine was surprised in 2014 when Palmer United Party leader Clive Palmer rang her program to compete in a quiz segment.

In December 2023, it was confirmed Higgins-Devine would be returning to Drive in 2024. She remained in Drive for year before returning to Evenings in 2025.

Since 2021, Higgins-Devine has been a tutor at the University of Southern Queensland.

=== Awards ===
At the ABC Local Radio awards in 2007, Higgins-Devine was named as ABC Local Radio's Broadcaster of the Year.

At the 2011 ABC Local Radio awards, Higgins-Devine was recognised with an award in the “Best Use of the Medium” category for her coverage of Cyclone Yasi.

== Personal life ==
Kelly married Craig Devine in August 1998, and they have a daughter Mackenzie who was born in November 2002.

In 2022, Higgins-Devine underwent a double bypass after being diagnosed with cardiovascular disease.

After noticing symptoms including shortness of breath and chest pain, she underwent tests which confirmed she had two blocked arteries.

Higgins-Devine returned to Evenings on ABC Radio Brisbane after 12 weeks of recovery. She credited her husband and daughter for being able to heal steadily.
