= Katherine Feeney (radio presenter) =

Australian radio presenter and journalist

- Born: Canberra, Australian Capital Territory, Australia
- Education: University of Queensland
- Occupation: radio presenter
- Known for: writing a sex & relationships column; reporting for television news; hosting a radio program
- Notable work: "CityKat" (Brisbane Times); Nine News (QTQ-9); Afternoons (ABC Radio Brisbane)
- Spouse: James Mackay
- Children: 1

Katherine Feeney (born c. 1988) is an Australian radio presenter and journalist. She has hosted Afternoons on ABC Radio Brisbane.

== Early life ==
Although born in Canberra, Feeney grew up in Queensland residing in such regional cities as Mount Isa, Gladstone and Toowoomba before settling in Brisbane.

Feeney graduated from Indooroopilly State High School before studying journalism and economics at the University of Queensland.

== Career ==
In 2007, Feeney commenced work with the Brisbane Times at the age of 19 where she made a name for herself writing a sex and relationships column entitled "CityKat".

Feeney also wrote reviews of theatre productions, one of which was for the Queensland Theatre Company's production of Arthur Miller's The Crucible which garnered some attention for its harsh criticism.

While she was with the Brisbane Times, Feeney regularly appeared on television programs such as Mornings with Kerri-Anne and Nine News Now.

In 2014, Feeney became a television reporter for Nine News Queensland, where she covered natural disasters, politics and urban affairs.

After gaining experience as a casual producer and reporter with ABC Radio Brisbane, Feeney was touted as a replacement for outgoing Breakfast host Spencer Howson in 2016. However, in December 2017, Feeney was announced as the new host of the station's Afternoons program, initially airing between 2pm and 4pm, following a national music and culture program hosted by Myf Warhurst.

Following the axing of Warhurst's program in late 2019, Feeney's role was extended with the program airing from 12:30pm to 3:30pm from 2019, with the 90 minutes between 1:30pm and 3:00pm being simulcast across Queensland on the ABC Local Radio network.

While Feeney has been with ABC Radio Brisbane, she has contributed a number articles to The Guardian and has occasionally appeared as a panelist on Network 10's The Project.

== Personal life ==
Feeney's husband is James Mackay who from 2019 to 2023 served as the Indooroopilly-based Liberal National Party councillor for Brisbane City Council's Walter Taylor Ward.

In 2018, Feeney and Mackay appeared on the SBS Television current affairs program Insight, during an episode entitled "To Have And Withhold" where guests discussed why couples get prenuptial agreements.
