= Disappearance of Tony Jones =

Australian unsolved disappearance case

Tony Jones
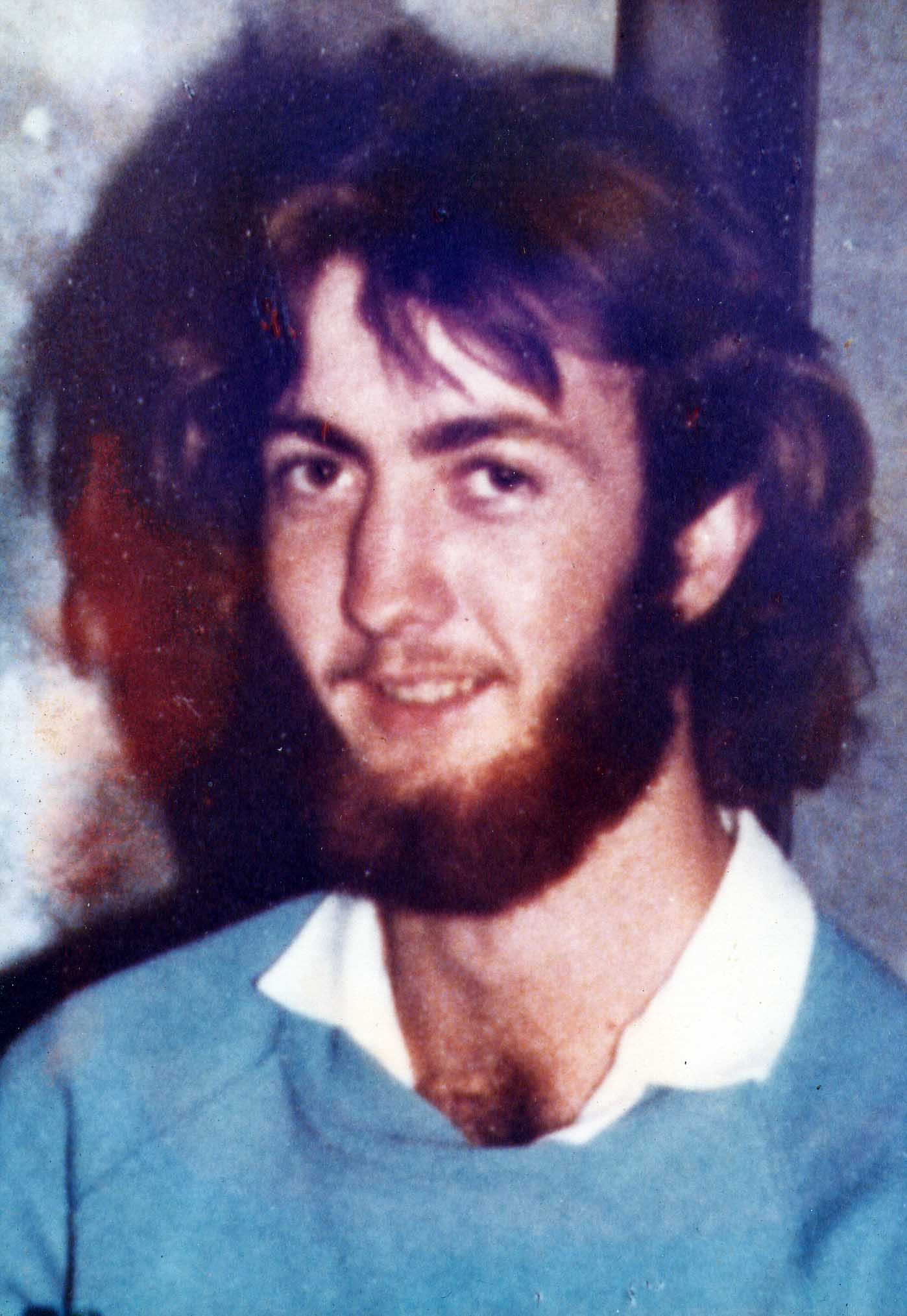
- Jones in 1982
- Born: Anthony John Jones; 3 July 1962; Perth, Western Australia, Australia
- Disappeared: 3 November 1982 (aged 20); Townsville, Queensland, Australia
- Status: Missing for 43 years, 11 months and 29 days
- Parents: Kevin Jones (father); Beres Jones (mother)

Anthony John Jones was an Australian man who disappeared while backpacking in North Queensland in November 1982. The case garnered substantial media attention, with critics charging that police mishandled the investigation into Jones' disappearance.

== Disappearance ==
Locations
1 Sun City Caravan Park, Rosslea - last confirmed sighting of Jones alive.
2 Grand Hotel, Hughenden - unconfirmed sightings of man resembling Jones albeit with beard.
3 Mount Isa - Jones and brothers final intended destination.
4 Cairns - where Jones took a solo side trip to.
5 Cloncurry - where his letter to his mother was found and the first search took place.
6 Lochiel - where possibly hoax letter from Cairns suggested Jones body was buried.
7 Rising Sun Hotel, Townsville where suspect was witnessed speaking with Jones.
8 Anthill Creek - Last sighting of Jones.

At the time of his disappearance, Tony Jones, a native of Perth, was in the last stages of a six-month working holiday around Australia. After quick visits to Adelaide, Melbourne, Canberra and Sydney, he settled for several months in Brisbane before finally setting off on the homeward leg of the journey with his brother Tim. For three weeks, Jones hitchhiked while his brother rode a bicycle. They communicated by phoning relatives and leaving messages for each other. Along the way, they met up briefly at Mackay and Airlie Beach and spent a week together in Townsville, where they shared a caravan with two fellow travelers at the Sun City Caravan Park in Rosslea.

On 28 October 1982, after Tim began the 900 km bike ride out west to Mount Isa, Jones set off alone for a side trip to Cairns. When he arrived back in Townsville on 3 November, he telephoned his family and girlfriend in Perth. He was surprised to learn that Tim had already reached Mount Isa, and learned that his mother had just topped up his bank account with $150 that was to be shared with Tim. Jones made no more phone calls and did not use his bank account again. He never reached Mount Isa.

== Coronial inquest ==
In May 1983, the government issued a reward of $20,000 for information which leads to the apprehension and conviction of the person or persons responsible for the disappearance and suspected murder of Jones. In 2010, the reward was increased to $250,000.

Despite no body having been found, Coroner Ian Fisher stated in his findings on 20 February 2002 that Jones was a victim of homicide. "I am satisfied that the missing person is dead," wrote the coroner. "I find that he died on or around the 3rd of November 1982 at the hands of a person or persons unknown". In spite of the homicide finding, Jones' family was initially unable to get a death certificate because of an anomaly in Queensland legislation, which prevented the issuance of a death certificate in cases where the coroner failed to indicate a specific place of death. The Attorney-General of Queensland and Minister for Justice, Linda Lavarch, subsequently introduced new legislation in 2005, saying "the Jones family has suffered enough...they should not suffer further by not being able to get a death certificate for their son". The certificate was eventually issued in January 2006.

=== Reopening of the coronial inquest ===
The Jones family's review of inquest documents in 2007 unearthed a slew of neglected leads. However, owing to the protracted and unsatisfactory response of police and government officials, and a refusal by authorities to refer the case to the cold case unit, the family petitioned the Attorney-General Cameron Dick on 14 June 2009 to reopen the inquest. The petition was ignored for fifteen months. Then, in September 2010, when the Queensland government launched a "walk a day in my shoes" campaign in a bid to curb its falling ratings in the opinion polls, Brian Jones, a brother of the victim, sent Dick a pair of his shoes, daring him to walk in the shoes of a victim of Queensland crime. On 18 September, a day after the shoes arrived at his office, Dick announced that he had instructed the State Coroner Michael Barnes to reopen the inquest.

The new inquest has been beset with long delays, a protracted police investigation and a changeover of key personnel such as the coroner and counsel assisting. However, on 14 April 2016, some six years after the family first petitioned Dick, State Coroner Terry Ryan held a pre-inquest hearing and subsequently scheduled the new inquest to be held in Townsville from 29 August until 9 September 2016. The hearing was later suspended, pending a judicial review in September 2018, which was unsuccessful.

== Cloncurry search ==
In January 2011, a retired grazier from Cloncurry informed the Jones family of old evidence that appeared to have been lost or forgotten by police for decades. He said that about 29 years earlier he had given Cloncurry police some physical evidence which he and a friend, a retired police officer, found on the edge of the township. The evidence included remnants of some camping gear and a letter addressed to Jones from his mother.

The witness said he was frustrated by the lack of response from police when he made inquiries in 2010 about the old evidence; however, the family relayed his story to the coroner, and the coroner instructed police to undertake a thorough search of the campsite. On 11 October 2011, a search party of eight officers and four SES volunteers spent six hours searching the campsite—identified as a 50 m^{2} area beside the Cloncurry River near the intersection of Quamby Road and Barkly Highway. The search failed to find any sign of Jones' belongings or remains. After the search, Northern Region Crime Coordinator, Detective Acting Inspector Mick Walker, told the media that police were still investigating what happened to the evidence handed in to Cloncurry police.

== Prison cell confession ==
A former prisoner came forward on 13 October 2011, saying that while incarcerated at the Townsville Correctional Centre in January 2000, a cell mate confessed they "did a bloke out near Mount Isa." Prison and criminal records helped identify the suspect as Michael James Laundess. More information on the suspect was expected to come to light at the coronial inquest, but long delays resulted in a missed opportunity to hear what Laundess had to say about the allegations and the location of the body. With the inquest still on hold, Laundess died in Perth on 17 October 2015, aged 53.

== Criticisms of the Queensland Police investigation ==
The first attempts of the Jones family to phone in a missing persons report on 11 November 1982 were complicated by red tape. The investigation by Queensland Police only commenced three days later when family members traveled five thousand kilometres to file the report in person. As stated at the inquest, basic inquiries were neglected: for example, police failed to get a report from the hospital on treatment Jones had received prior to his disappearance, and at least one key witness mentioned by the coroner was never interviewed. The family was also left without police assistance when they conducted a door-knock inquiry in the vicinity of the phone booth on Bowen Road, Rosslea, which was the last confirmed whereabouts. Police did not release a composite sketch of a suspect until ten years after they received information about the suspect.

Media reports on the inquest highlighted other problems with the investigation, reporting that some of the witness statements were missing and that the former investigating officer had been uncooperative with coronial inquiries. The media also reported that it wasn't until 2001 that statements were obtained from several people who first approached police in 1982. Other criticisms were voiced by the coroner and the coroner's assistant. Coroner Fisher said "more attention should have been given to early investigation", while his assistant, Sergeant Kym Farquharson-Jones, said the inquest evidence showed police investigations into the disappearance were "not sufficient by today's standard."

The view of Sergeant Farquharson-Jones is indicative of the systemic problems highlighted in the Fitzgerald Inquiry report. Tony Fitzgerald QC, who presided over the Royal Commission into police misconduct, said the Queensland Police culture of the 1980s was "debilitated by misconduct, inefficiency, incompetence, and deficient leadership". As a result of the Fitzgerald Inquiry, the Commissioner of Police Terry Lewis, who held the post during the early years of the Jones investigation, was subsequently convicted and jailed for corruption.

In defence of the police handling of the Jones case, Det. Snr. Sgt. Chris Lill, who worked on the case for about fifteen years, said in a report to the Townsville coroner that "rightly or wrongly, missing persons over the age of sixteen years of age did not attract or command the deployment or availability of resources as they would have in this day and age".

== Unresolved leads ==
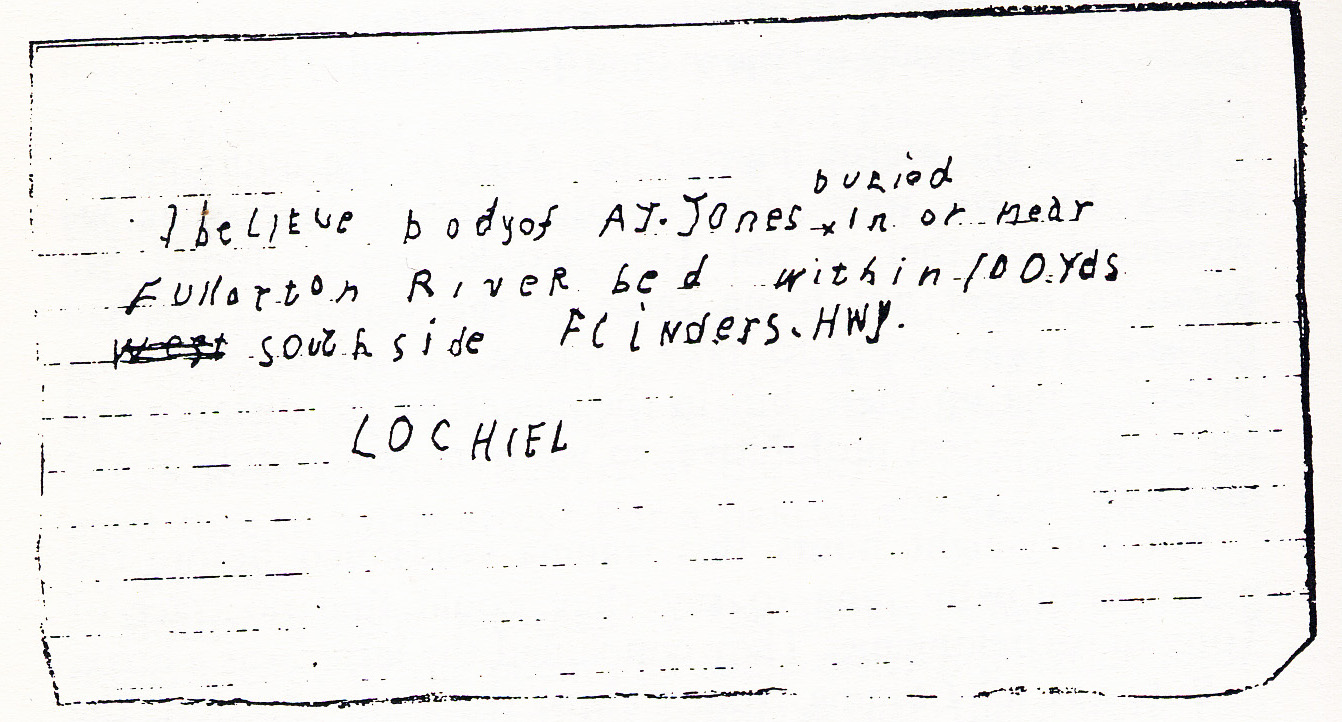
The Lochiel letter

In January 1983 police received a tip-off on the whereabouts of Jones' body. The letter was postmarked Cairns, where Jones had visited in the days before his disappearance. The text is as follows:

"I believe body of AJ Jones buried in or near Fullarton River bed within 100 yds ~~west~~ southside Flinders Hwy. Lochiel"

After a fruitless two-day search, police concluded the letter was a hoax. Inquest documents reveal that in the weeks before the search, the dry river bed was flowing with "about 20-foot of water" and that there was "not much hope" of finding any trace of Jones or his belongings. The Jones family urged police to use DNA profiling of the Lochiel evidence to determine the identity of Lochiel; for years police declined on the grounds the evidence had not been preserved in good condition, but they subsequently admitted to coronial investigators that they had lost the Lochiel letter.

A witness told police he had seen an older man with Jones at the Rising Sun Hotel in Townsville on the night he disappeared. Ten years later, in 1992, police published an identikit picture of the suspect.

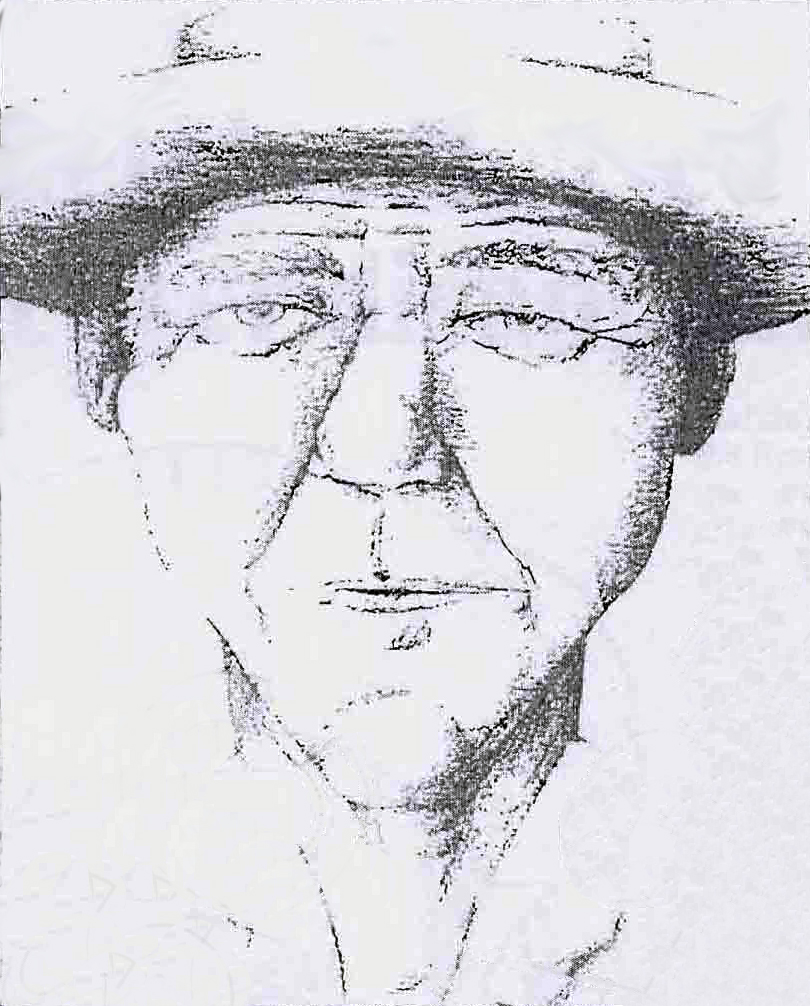
First sketch of suspect

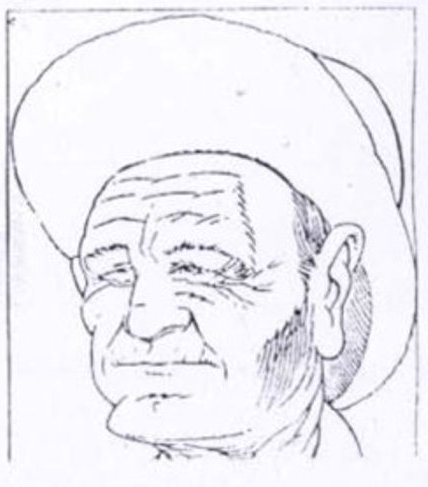
Second sketch of suspect

The first tip-offs from the public suggested the sketch resembled the former police superintendent Mervyn Henry Stevenson, a former stock squad officer whose retirement as officer in charge of the Townsville police about a year before Jones disappeared was tainted by accusations of corruption. Stevenson's name surfaced during the original inquest in 2001, but inquest transcripts and the 2009 follow-up police report by case investigator Senior Sergeant John Mahony indicate that up until that time (seventeen years after the tip-offs), police had never investigated Stevenson's involvement in the disappearance. In February 2016, during the lead up to the new inquest, Mahony confirmed Stevenson was a person of interest and that "it is now up to the Coroner to decide if Merv will play a part in the inquest".

A second sketch was produced by Townsville Bulletin artist Chris Brunton. The sketch yielded several more leads, some of which had not been investigated by the time of the inquest in 2002. The coroner instructed police to continue their investigation of those leads, particularly in relation to two persons of interest called Pickering and Douglas; however, another seven years elapsed before police acted on the coroner's instructions and by that time, Pickering and Douglas had both died.

A 1999 internal police memo (obtained by the Jones family under the Freedom of Information Act 1982) alludes to another suspect with a prior criminal conviction. The case officer wrote the following to the homicide squad:

"I have also received a letter from a retired grazier who has named a suspect by the name of (blank) and I note that his history indicates he is most probably a (blank) and I consider that he should be interviewed. I have attached a copy of the letter."

However, neither the grazier's letter nor details of any homicide inquiries related to the letter were documented or discussed at the inquest in 2002 or ever made known to the family.

Jones was known to be carrying a dismantled rifle in his backpack at the time of his disappearance, but the rifle has never been found. It is a .22 calibre Voere rifle, serial number 257435; and the stock was stained dark red.

== Renewed hope of major breakthrough ==
On 8 February 2014, Mahony announced that "fresh and credible" information linking Jones to a country town in northwest Queensland had sparked renewed hope of a major breakthrough. Further updates about the breakthrough were given on 10 February 2014 by Townsville Detective Acting Superintendent Cheryl Scanlon, who announced that a team of detectives was heading to Hughenden to speak with people who lived and worked in the town the year Jones disappeared. On 12 February, Scanlon said new information had indicated Jones may have been murdered at Hughenden.

Hughenden first became a place of interest in December 1982 when at least five people from the area alleged that on the weekend of 12–14 November, they talked with a young hitchhiker who bore a resemblance to Jones. Police collected statements and made further inquiries around town. It transpired that one sighting referred to a young man of Aboriginal descent; another to an Italian tourist. The others were about a man with a full beard. One witness said she had talked with Jones at the Grand Hotel around 8.00 pm on 12 November and that he was identical to the photograph of Jones, including what she called the "Abraham Lincoln-style" beard. The fact that Jones had shaved his beard off a few days before his disappearance, as well as the elapse of time and failure to access his bank account or contact his family or girlfriend in that time, meant that all the Hughenden sightings were subsequently dismissed by the lead investigator, Det. Chris Lill, and by Coroner Fisher in the 2002 coronial inquest.

== Missing Persons Week ==
Jones' disappearance was the inspiration and catalyst for the establishment of Australia's National Missing Persons Week in 1988. The inaugural Missing Persons Week was launched with a memorial service at the Holy Spirit Church in Townsville, after which the city's mayor planted a tree in commemoration of Jones. Missing Persons Week is now held every year in Australia in the first week of August to highlight the plight of missing persons and their families.

== Cold case playing cards ==
In February 2008, more than 500 decks of cold case playing cards were distributed to inmates at several Queensland prisons in the hope that significant crimes could be solved if prisoners revealed information after being prompted by the cards. Details of Jones could be found on the two of spades.

== See also ==
- List of people who disappeared
