= Depot Hill, Queensland =

Depot Hill
- Suburb
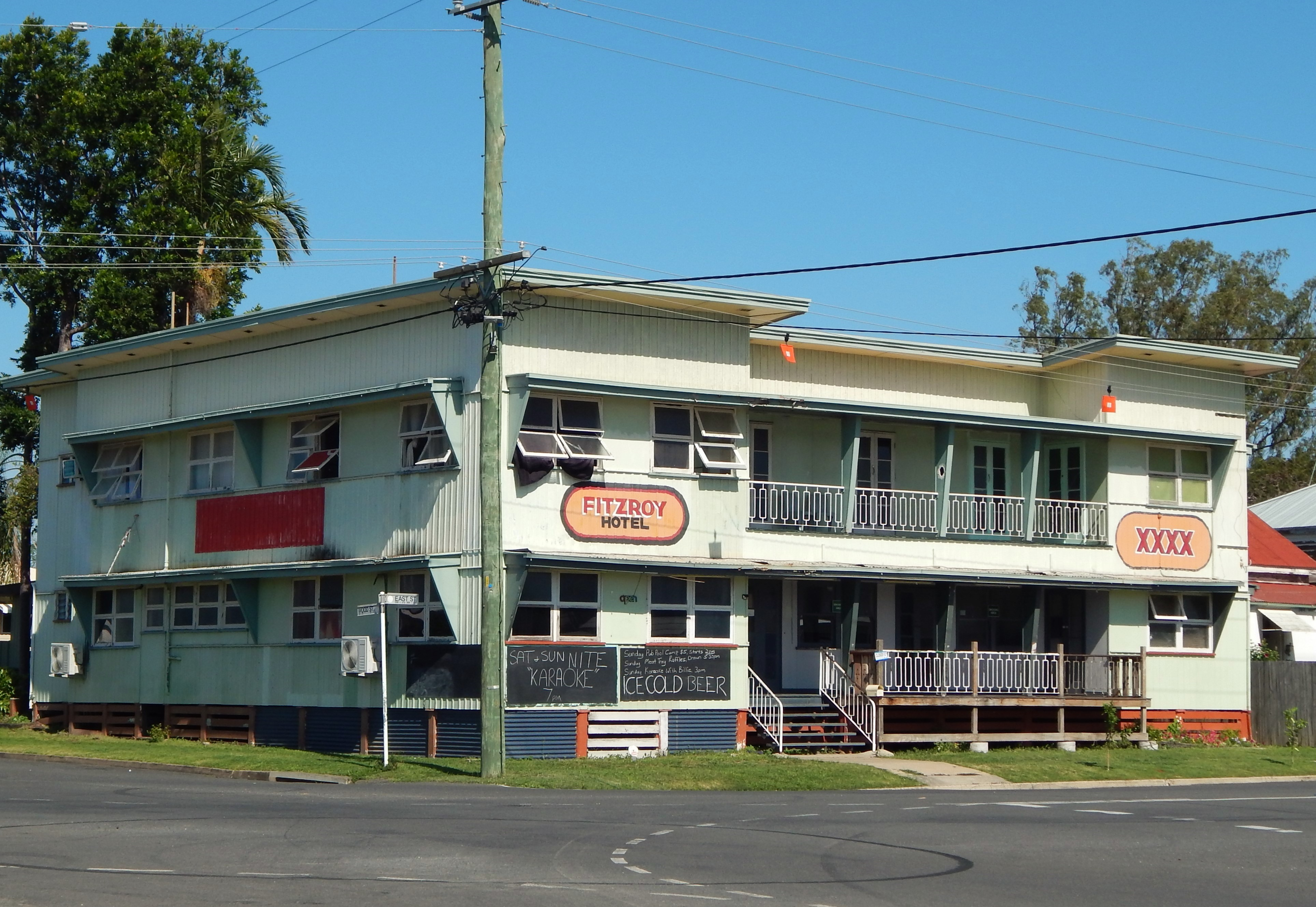
- Fitzroy Hotel in Depot Hill, 2021

- Interactive map of Depot Hill
- Coordinates: 23.3947°S 150.5194°E
- Country: Australia
- State: Queensland
- City: Rockhampton
- LGA: Rockhampton Region
- Location: 2.1 km (1.3 mi) SSE of Rockhampton CBD; 640 km (400 mi) NNW of Brisbane

Government
  - State electorate: Rockhampton
  - Federal division: Capricornia

Area
  - Total: 3.1 km^{2} (1.2 sq mi)

Population
  - Total: 995 (2021 census)
  - Density: 321/km^{2} (831/sq mi)
- Time zone: UTC+10:00 (AEST)
- Postcode: 4700
Suburbs around Depot Hill
Rockhampton CBD	The Common	The Common
Allenstown	Depot Hill	Port Curtis
Allenstown	Port Curtis	Port Curtis

Depot Hill is a suburb of Rockhampton in the Rockhampton Region, Queensland, Australia. In the 2021 census, Depot Hill had a population of 995 people.

== Geography ==
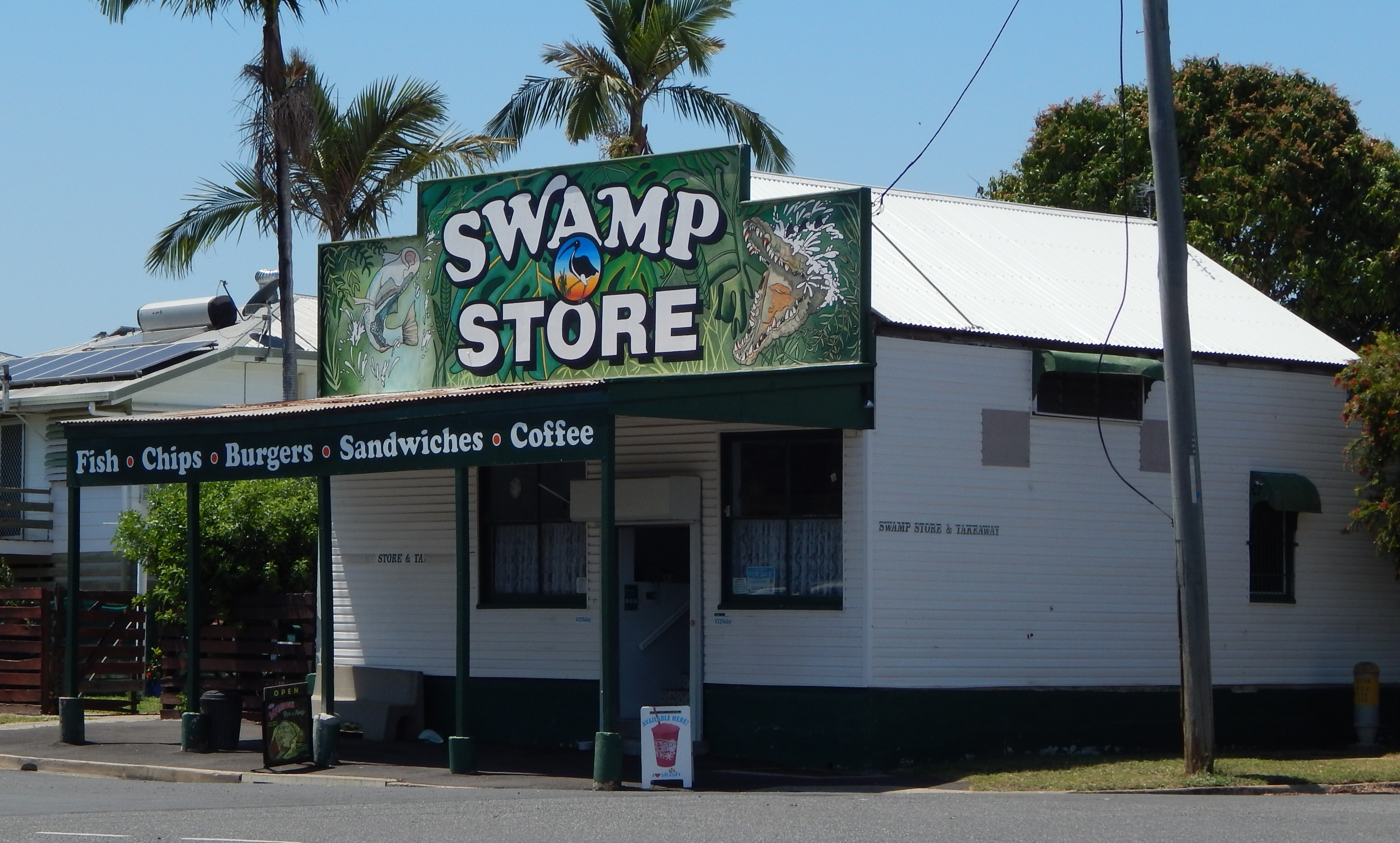
Depot Hill's Swamp Store, 2021

Depot Hill is situated about one kilometre south of the Rockhampton central business district. It is considered a low socioeconomic area. It also suffers extensively from flooding due to its proximity to the Fitzroy River and its height above sea level.

The North Coast railway line passes through the suburb from the south-west to the north-west with access to the Rockhampton Railway Workshops in the north of the suburb.

== History ==
Depot Hill State School opened on 14 September 1920.

In 1932 the Wood Street Baptist Church opened at 10 Wood Street (23.3906°S 150.5224°E).

On 13 March 1949 the Mary Immaculate Catholic Church was officially opened and blessed by Bishop Andrew Gerard Tynan. The church building had originally been the Catholic church at Westwood, but it was relocated to 81 Wood Street in Depot Hill (23.3933°S 150.5183°E). The church has now closed and passed into private ownership.

== Demographics ==
In the 2006 census, Depot Hill had a population of 1,164.

In the 2011 census, Depot Hill had a population of 1,064 people.

In the 2016 census, Depot Hill had a population of 1,032 people.

In the 2021 census, Depot Hill had a population of 995 people.

== Heritage listings ==
Depot Hill has a number of heritage-listed sites, including:

- Rockhampton Railway Workshops, 380 Bolsover Street (23.3873°S 150.5172°E)

== Education ==
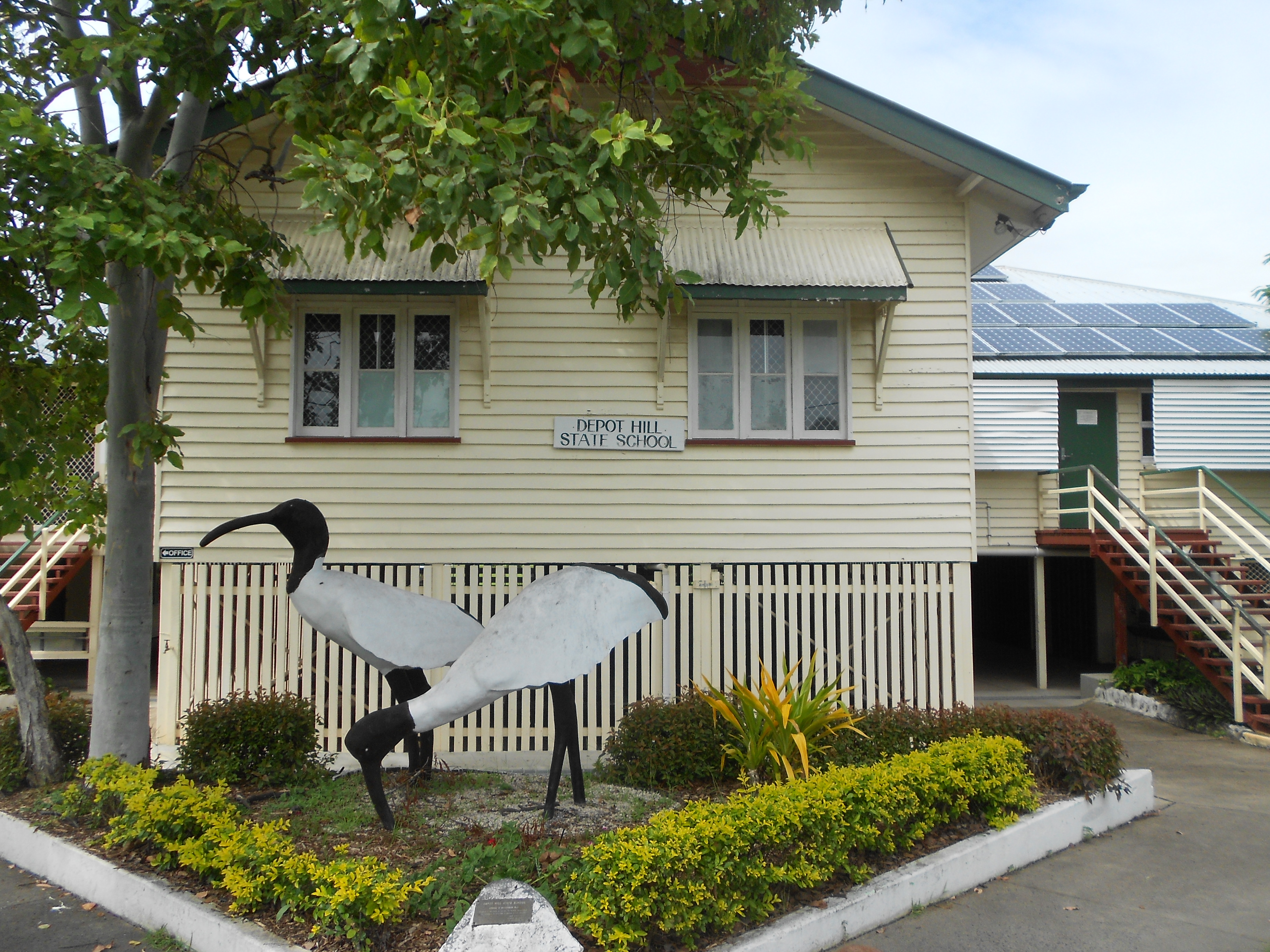
Depot Hil State School, 2021

Depot Hill State School is a government primary (Prep–6) school for boys and girls at 53–63 O'Connell Street (23.3959°S 150.5176°E). In 2017, the school had an enrolment of 47 students with 4 teachers and 7 non-teaching staff (4 full-time equivalent).

In 2020 the school was expected to mark its 100th anniversary with special centenary celebrations but due to the COVID-19 pandemic, the festivities were postponed to 2021. A special weekend of festivities commenced on 17 September 2021 with a special dinner at a hotel in Allenstown. Celebrations at the school were held the following day which included market stalls, memorabilia displays, classroom tours and a special roll call of former students. Local state MP Barry O'Rourke also officially opened the school's new multipurpose court.

In 2021, the school had an enrolment of 58 students.

There are no secondary schools in Depot Hill; the nearest state high school is Rockhampton State High School in Wandal. The nearest private secondary school is The Cathedral College in Allenstown.
