= Rockhampton Railway Workshops =

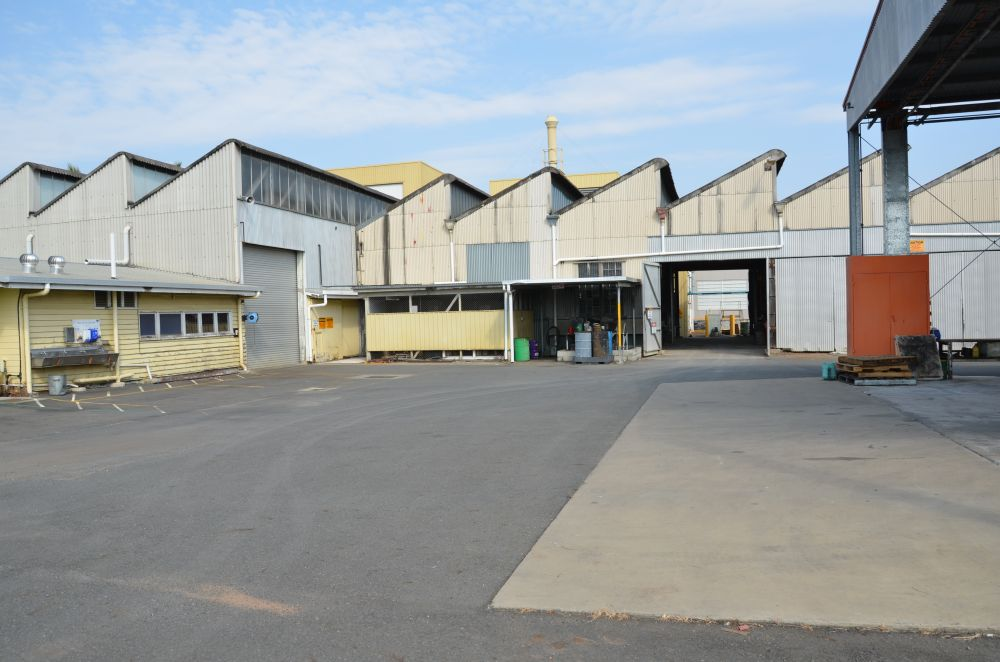
- Rockhampton Railway Workshops, 2011

- Location within Queensland Location within Australia
- 23.3873°S 150.5172°E
- Location: 380 Bolsover Street, Depot Hill, Rockhampton Region, Queensland, Australia

History
- Design period: 1900 - 1914 (early 20th century)
- Built: 1915 - 1953

Queensland Heritage Register
- Official name: Railway Workshops, Rockhampton Roundhouse, Rockhamtpton Railway Workshops
- Type: state heritage (built)
- Designated: 21 August 1992
- Reference no.: 600783
- Significant period: 1915-1969 (historical); 1915-1950s (fabric)
- Significant components: power house - electricity, track, shed/s, shop - carriage, shop - machine, machinery/plant/equipment - transport - rail, locomotive roundhouse, turntable, shop - paint, workshop

Rockhampton Railway Workshops is a heritage-listed railway workshop at 380 Bolsover Street, Depot Hill, Rockhampton Region, Queensland, Australia. It was built from 1915 to 1953. It is also known as Rockhampton Roundhouse. It was added to the Queensland Heritage Register on 21 August 1992.

== History ==
The original workshops at Rockhampton were established in the late 1870s at the railway reserve area bounded by Denison, South, Campbell and Stanley Street. With a change of location in the early years of the 20th century, further development took place in the mid to late 1910s as part of a redevelopment of the entire railway infrastructure in Rockhampton. With many modifications and adaptations over time, the railway workshops continue to function as an operational railway workshop maintaining and repairing railway rolling stock.

In 1863 the Parliament of Queensland passed the controversial Railway Bill, which committed Queensland to the use of a narrow gauge for the development of its main line in Queensland. Other colonies in Australia at this time had adopted broader gauges for use on their rail networks. Queensland on the recommendation of Abram Fitzgibbon its first Commissioner and consultant engineer on the first survey, authorised the use of a 3 ft 6 in gauge main line. The reasoning behind this decision was that a narrow gauge would be of economic benefit to the new colony. The economic benefit would be lower cost of construction work.

The first section of the Queensland railway network was opened between Ipswich and Bigges Camp (now Grandchester) on 31 July 1865. The projected development of the railway network was to link the towns of Warwick, Dalby and Toowoomba with Ipswich. At the time that the Railway Act had been passed the 5000 citizens of Rockhampton objected to having no provision made for the construction of a railway to their hinterland. At the period that railway construction was being agitated for connection with copper ore being exploited in the Peak Downs area. A railway was thought to ensure further economic development of the interior.

The first length of the Central Western railway line was opened to Westwood 50 kilometres (31 mi) from Rockhampton in 1867. The first section opened was a major financial loss, as it terminated at a point before crossing the coastal ranges, and attracted no traffic. Further extension of the line westwards was not possible until 1872, when parliamentary approval was given to continue beyond the Comet River and Gogango Range. The line was built towards what is now the town of Emerald, being opened to that point in 1879.

The Central Railway was progressively extended further west reaching Longreach in 1892. With its headquarters at Rockhampton, the Central Railway remained an isolated railway system, with no connection to the southern division of Queensland railways until 1903. The Railway Department in 1890 investigated the possibility of linking Rockhampton's two separate railways.

In 1895 construction was approved for what was to be known as the Rockhampton Junction Railway. The combination of projected traffic for the port at Broadmount, and the anticipated growth of suburban traffic in Rockhampton, saw that the connecting line and new bridge would both be built with a double line, the first examples outside of the Brisbane-Ipswich metropolitan area.

The Central Line continued to expand throughout the early part of the twentieth century. A major element of this expansion was the approval construction of the North Coast railway line to Mackay. With additional mileage being opened extra services were provided by the Railway Department to cope with increased patronage. New workshop and running sheds were also required to maintain and service the extra rollingstock operating on the Central line.

A partial roundhouse consisting of seven roads had been erected in 1877 on the railway reserve area bounded by Denison, South, Campbell and Stanley streets. The original running shed was reported as being too small by 1878, and additional stalls were added in 1880. The extension of the railway network saw further stalls added. Further improvements were made in 1903, and locomotive service facilities (coal stage and water supply) were also upgraded at the same time. Available space at the roundhouse was at a premium and inaccessibility to servicing roads meant that storage problems were further compounded.

In the early 1910s, there were changes made to the administration of railways in the state. There was a large expansion in the infrastructure with many new facilities commissioned and constructed. There were also improvements in locomotive technology, in rolling stock and railway infrastructure.

In October 1909 estimates and plans were prepared for a new roundhouse with triple the capacity of the existing building. At the same time that plans were being drawn up for the new roundhouse, expansion of the railway workshops in Rockhampton was also being investigated. The Railways Department sought the acquisition of Fitzroy Square, a park and recreation area owned by Rockhampton City Council. The negotiations for resumption of Fitzroy Square were not completed until 1912. In a similar fashion to the development of the Mayne depot site (1911–30) large amounts of landfill were required, to level the area and provide foundation beds for heavy machinery.

Drawings were prepared by the Chief Railway's Engineer for workshop buildings, constructed as part of the redevelopment of the site in conjunction with the roundhouse, including the blacksmiths' shop (demolished) and the machine shop. Construction on the shops was delayed due to the shortages caused by World War I as there was difficulty in obtaining steel for the framing of the buildings. Expenditure to 1915 on the alterations to station yards and construction of the workshops at Rockhampton was £23,000.

The new locomotive roundhouse was opened in late 1915, while work continued on the rest of the workshop buildings. As the buildings were finished they were occupied one by one. By 1916 the machine shop was reported as being almost complete in the Commissioner's report for that year. By 1917 the former machine shop (now comprising only four bays and currently unused) and the former paint shop (now the Building Maintenance Shop) were completed and occupied by staff. The paint shop was an existing building that is thought to have been relocated to the site from Broadmount Wharf, a railway wharf established to the north of the city to service the deepwater port there.

The former boiler erecting shop (now the Fabrication Services Building), the former carriage repair shop (now the Machine Shop), the timber mill (demolished), the coppersmith's (demolished) and the former electricians' shop (now the Plan Maintenance Building) were completed by 1918. The buildings were generally of steel frame construction and sheeted in corrugated iron, with gabled roofs. Some had earth floors while others were floored in timber or concrete. With the construction of these buildings, the workshops were all but complete. In 1918, work was transferred to the new workshops. The old workshops were used for the storage of rail carriages.

The names of the various buildings at the workshop indicated their functions. For example, in the machine shop employees worked on small engine components, using a variety of lathes, milling machines, planing machines, grinders and drillers while the wheel repair shop repaired wheels of rolling stock.

The period of 1909–1914 was a period of massive expansion for the Railways Department in Queensland. New workshops and running sheds were to be constructed at Ipswich (North Ipswich Railway Workshops), Mayne (in Brisbane) and Rockhampton. The first of these modern running sheds was at North Ipswich (1910, closed 1972 and demolished 1978). Along with this workshop, facilities were to be modernised at Ipswich and Rockhampton and other centres. Modern locomotives and carriage stock were also to be ordered. The expansion of the railway network was to culminate in the passing of the North Coast Railway Act 1910, which sought to unify the separate divisions of the Queensland Railways, into one network.

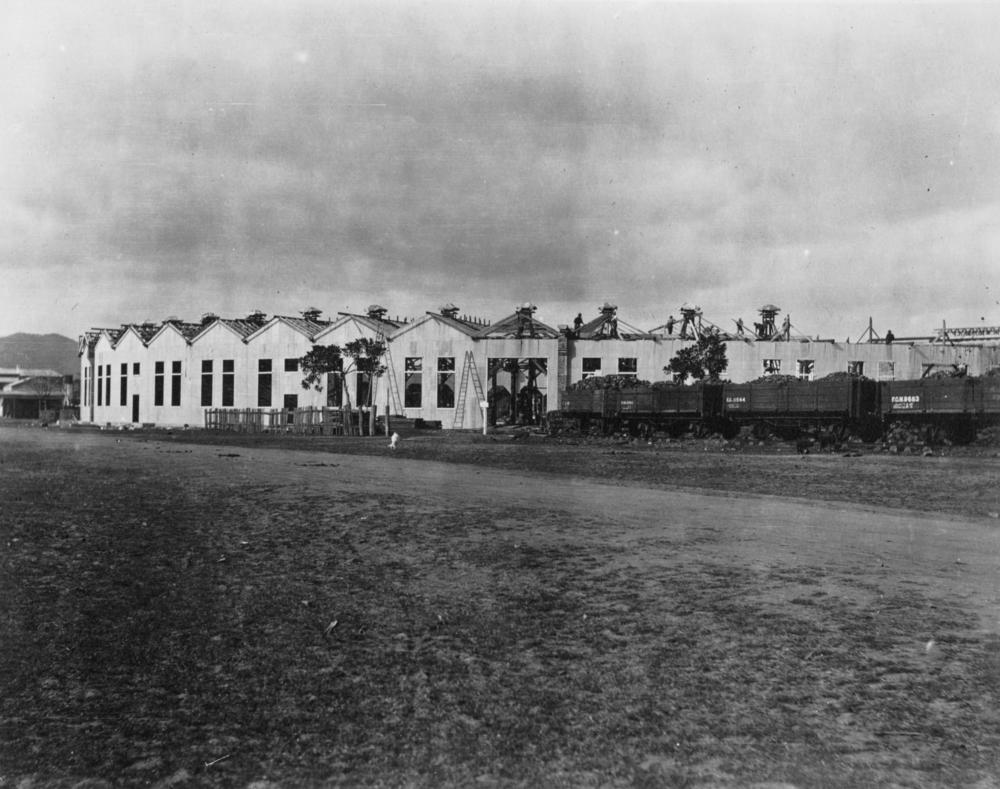
Roundhouse locomotive shed, Rockhampton Railway Workshops, 1914

The former steam locomotive running shed (the roundhouse) is a significant element of the development and decline of the steam locomotive as a mode of traction for Queensland Railways in the years 1914–69. The roundhouse was a purpose-built building, designed for the storage, servicing, and running maintenance of steam locomotives allocated to the Central Division based on Rockhampton. The building is significant as the only full circle roundhouse ever constructed in Queensland for the use of steam locomotives, and as one of the last surviving examples of such a building in Australia.

The original plan had called for two roundhouses to be built in Rockhampton, however only one was to be constructed. Foundation work began in August 1913 for a complete circle roundhouse with 52 stalls allocated for stabling locomotives in traffic. Drop pits were to be constructed, along with inspection pits. The central element of the roundhouse was to be a revolving turntable allowing for access to each of the engine bays and individual stalls. In a design similar to the North Ipswich roundhouse an external circular running road was provided to accommodate a shunt locomotive held captive serving as a mobile boiler for wash out purposes.

Whilst the North Ipswich, and Willowburn (1928–29) roundhouses were developed using a two-thirds circular design, Rockhampton was unique in Queensland in featuring a fully enclosed space. The ambitious plans for two roundhouses at Rockhampton was similarly mirrored in the development of the Mayne steam locomotive depot where three semi-circular roundhouses were planned. These plans were later altered for the construction of a through engine shed design based on American patterning (c.1918).

The development of the Rockhampton roundhouse and workshops was a simultaneous undertaking. The design of the roundhouse was to feature external cladding of the walls with corrugated iron sheeting. Milled timber was supplied from the North Ipswich Railway Workshops. Bricks for construction of piers and to divide off locomotive bays were supplied from Mount Morgan brickworks. Departmental labour day labour was used on construction. The Capricornian described the work in progress in July 1914, mentioning that "the finishing touches" were being put on the roundhouse and workshops roofing, brick piers and concrete flooring. The roundhouse was completed in November 1914. Contemporary accounts describe it as being capable of stabling 52 locomotives. It was provided with a turntable, which enabled each engine to be put into the stall required for washing out the boiler or for necessary repairs, while it also protected the engine from the weather.

The whole of the roundhouse was lighted with electricity. At its opening, the roundhouse staff consisted of about 20 fitters, 6 boilermakers, and 16 shed men, light up men; while the running staff comprised 80 drivers and 70 fire fighters and 26 cleaners. The smoke from the engine funnels was carried to the atmosphere through proper vents. The roundhouse was equipped with an up-to-date plant, including a cylinder boring machine, pneumatic tools, and oxywelding plant.

The roundhouse featured five entry and exit roads leading from the turntable to the depot yards. The major exit and entry road was situated near the South Street entry gates. The Running Shed Foreman's Office was situated adjacent to this running line. The office area was part of the running shed environment, from where the dispatch of locomotives was monitored.

From the additional roads locomotives could be despatched for watering and coaling and prior to working from the Rockhampton yard. At the southern axis of the roundhouse an additional road gave access to the workshops environment, which was used for the movement of trolley's between the various workshop buildings.

The roundhouse was constructed with a capacity to hold 52 locomotives under cover, with additional storage space on roads radiating from the central turntable. The work environment was never fully utilised for the use of steam locomotives. Traffic demands within the Central Division did not require that the entire roundhouse be given over to exclusive occupancy of the running staff. Whilst the roundhouse was intended as a servicing and preparation area for locomotives, tinsmiths and coppersmiths were also accommodated in bays not needed for locomotives. This adaption was unique in the Queensland experience as all other semi-roundhouses constructed were utilised as steam sheds.

The second Rockhampton Roundhouse was never constructed. The area allocated instead was used as a modern coal stage constructed in 1934–5. The central point of the roundhouse, the turntable, was replaced in 1953 with a new turntable bridge capable of heavier axle loadings for locomotives. In the period of the mid-1950s the locomotive storage capacity of the Rockhampton depot was further increased when a special purpose steam shed was erected for the use of Beyer-Garratt engines transferred from the Southern Division for haulage of goods and passenger trains in central Queensland. A new steam shed was required as the overall length of the Beyer-Garratt engines exceeded the length of the turntable. Beyer-Garratt locomotives therefore could only use stalls in the roundhouse which did not require the turntable to spot them into the available roads.

In the period of the early 1950s new technological motive power was introduced onto Queensland Railways, when the first diesel-electric locomotives (DEL) arrived from the General-Electric Company. The new motive power was revolutionary and did not require the labour-intensive maintenance and preparation, nor produce the dirty environment of steam locomotives. The first DELs to be shedded at Rockhampton were in 1966, for use on export coal traffic. Prior to this DELs were worked through on the main line from Brisbane to Cairns. Diesel-electric locomotives were serviced at a separate location in the Rockhampton yard. With the introduction of the new technology, withdrawals of steam locomotives took place. The final steam locomotive was overhauled in Rockhampton Workshops in 1969. The roundhouse was officially closed to steam traction on 29 September 1969.

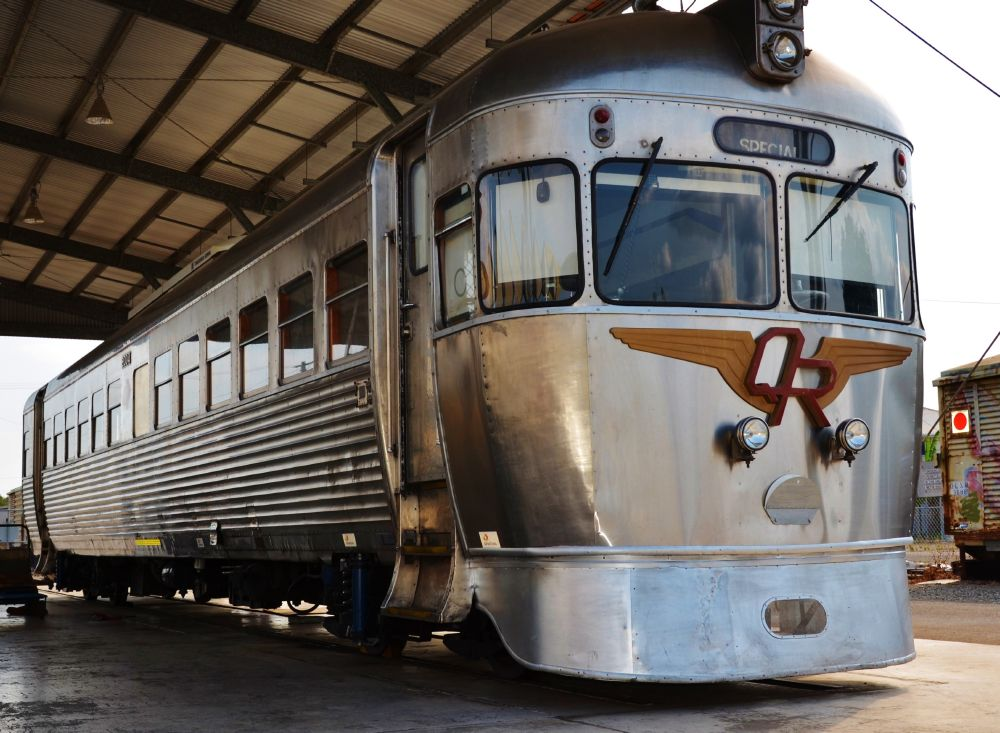
Railmotor at the workshop, 2011

Following closure as a steam depot the roundhouse was then used as a wagon repair and maintenance centre from 1969 until 1988 for wooden bodied vehicles. The roof was completely rebuilt in 1976–8 with hardwood timber being used to replace original pine framing. In 1982–3 in several stalls old concrete slabs were replaced with mass concrete, following complaints from employees. Carriage lifting gear and machinery was also installed at this time, as a partial modernisation of the working environment. In 1983 an office for subforemen was also built into one of the stalls in the roundhouse. In 1988 one of the bays was converted into a store area for breakdown equipment. The roundhouse was utilised as a wagon repair shop until 1990. In 1992–3 as part of a $20 million redevelopment of the Rockhampton Workshops, an administration complex was inserted into two bays of the south- eastern axis of the roundhouse, adjacent to the entry/exit road.

The railway workshops continues to function as an operational railway workshop maintaining and repairing railway rolling stock. Buildings are used for the repair of wagons, for the modification of wagons and locomotives and for general running maintenance. Queensland Rail is planning continued redevelopment of the site. In the future, it is proposed that Rockhampton will be the major workshop site for Queensland Rail in North Queensland. Particularly, the roundhouse remains today as a surviving infrastructural element of the steam era on Queensland Rail, and as part of the adaptive working environment of the railway workshops.

== Description ==
The Railway Workshops is located at the corner of Bolsover and South streets in Rockhampton. The site has undergone many changes over the years and comprises many buildings and structures associated with an operational railway workshop. Those buildings included in the heritage register boundary include the following.

=== Railway Roundhouse ===
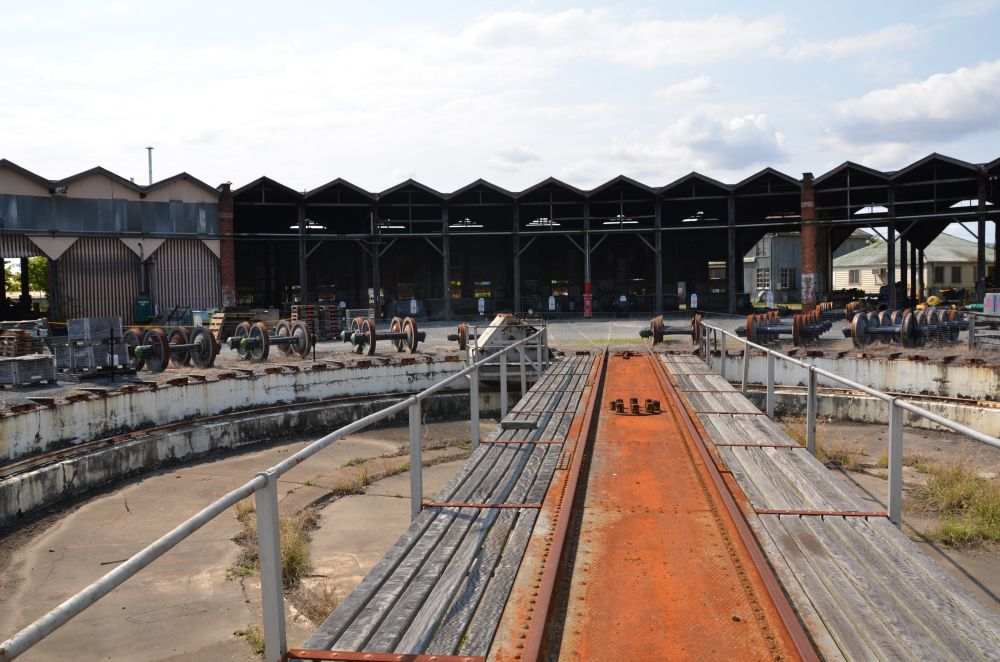
Roundhouse, 2011

The roundhouse is located at the corner of Bolsover and South streets and is a large circular shed with an internal courtyard containing a turntable. Round timber posts support a timber-framed roof. The roundhouse is clad with corrugated galvanised iron sheets.

The building comprises seven sections, each containing seven or eight stalls, making a total of 52. Each section forms a major space or room in the building and is bounded by radial brick fire walls, by faceted inner and outer walls, by a concrete floor with rails and pits and covered by a trussed roof. Each locomotive stall forms a shed for a single engine. Storage roads radiate from a central point.

A two-storeyed steel and glass office building is inserted within 14 of the 52 bays.

=== Former Power House (Plant Maintenance Building) ===
The building is a steel-framed structure clad with corrugated, galvanised iron with concrete floors.

=== Former Machine Shop ===
The former machine shop, located to the east of the roundhouse along Bolsover Street, consists of four bays, comprising steel columns and trusses to the centre and timber columns and roof framing to the side annexes. The building is clad with corrugated, galvanised cladding with a timber and concrete floor.

=== Former Carriage Shop (Machine Shop) ===
The building has timber columns and steel roof trusses clad with corrugated iron and a concrete floor. A vented ridge is located along its entire length. The former carriage shop is joined to the former paint shop to the south-east.

=== Former Paint Shop (Building Maintenance Shop) ===
The building is timber-framed, clad predominantly with corrugated iron, with a curved light steel bow string truss roof. The structure is clad to the north-east with timber battens above window sill level and corrugated iron below. The building has timber casement windows in groups of three. The floor comprises both concrete and timber sections. Timber-framed infills join the building to the former carriage shop.

=== Other buildings ===
The other buildings include:

- the timber-framed, gable-roofed, weatherboard-clad, former Apprentice Master's building to the west of the roundhouse along South Street
- a small timber-framed, galvanised iron-clad urinal to the north of the roundhouse
- the water fitters' store, a timber-framed, galvanised iron-clad building with a gable roof to the north of the roundhouse at the corner of South and Bolsover streets
- the occupational health centre and conference room which are single-storey, timber-framed and weatherboard-clad buildings located to the north and north-east of the roundhouse along Bolsover Street

The railway workshops are surrounded by the remainder of the workshops buildings, sheds, tracks and pathways which have been continually modified for over 85 years.

== Heritage listing ==
Rockhampton Railway Workshops was listed on the Queensland Heritage Register on 21 August 1992 having satisfied the following criteria.

The place is important in demonstrating the evolution or pattern of Queensland's history.

The Railway Workshops demonstrates the evolution of the Queensland Railways system and the growth of the Central Division based in Rockhampton. The site, including the roundhouse, workshop buildings, tracks and other buildings, spread over a large area, provides evidence that Rockhampton was, historically, a major railway terminus.

The Railway Workshops, particularly the roundhouse, demonstrates the evolutionary change of the motive power of Queensland Railways from steam based traction to diesel-electric and electric. The Railway Workshops is significant as it demonstrates an evolutionary solution to the need to service and stable labour-intensive machinery.

The place demonstrates rare, uncommon or endangered aspects of Queensland's cultural heritage.

The Rockhampton Roundhouse is significant as the only example of a full circle roundhouse constructed in Queensland, and, as one of only two examples still extant in Australia, it is significant as a rare example of this type of structure.

The place is important in demonstrating the principal characteristics of a particular class of cultural places.

The building demonstrates the characteristics of a steam locomotive running shed and maintenance depot consisting of stalls in a covered environment, inspection pits, centrally located locomotive turning facility, storage roads radiating from a central point, and boiler washout facility.

With steel frames, concrete floors and corrugated iron cladding, the former machine shop (when originally constructed, but now comprising four bays) and the former electricians' shop are significant as examples of standard Queensland Railway designs. The two are part of the group of buildings at the site which are larger and higher than others, usually to accommodate gantries for heavy lifting.

With timber columns, steel roof trusses, corrugated galvanised iron cladding and concrete floor, the former carriage shop also demonstrates a standard Queensland Railway design.

The Railway Workshops buildings are significant as the extant structures of a major facility constructed on the site in the early part of the 20th century, contributing to the understanding of the operation of the complex.

The place is important because of its aesthetic significance.

The Rockhampton Roundhouse is important for its aesthetic contribution to the railway workshop environment of Rockhampton, for its form and adaptation and particularly, for its contribution to the Bolsover and South Street streetscapes.

Together, the former machine and electricians' shops contribute to the industrial aesthetic of Bolsover Street. Set back from Bolsover Street, but still making a contribution to the streetscape are the former carriage repair shop and the former paint shop. The former paint shop has a curved roof, which makes a further aesthetic contribution to the complex. Both buildings are examples of the smaller workshops typically found at the site.

The place has a special association with the life or work of a particular person, group or organisation of importance in Queensland's history.

The Railway Workshops is significant for its association with the steam locomotive era of the Queensland Railways (1865–1969) and the period of growth of the Queensland Railway from 1907 to 1920. The roundhouse was a contemporary construction for the development of large steam depots such as Mayne (originally planned as three semi-circular sheds, later modified to two through shed designs), as well as a continuation of the roundhouse construction for other depots such as North Ipswich (1910) and later Willowburn (1928).
