= Rockhampton City, Queensland =

Rockhampton City
- Suburb
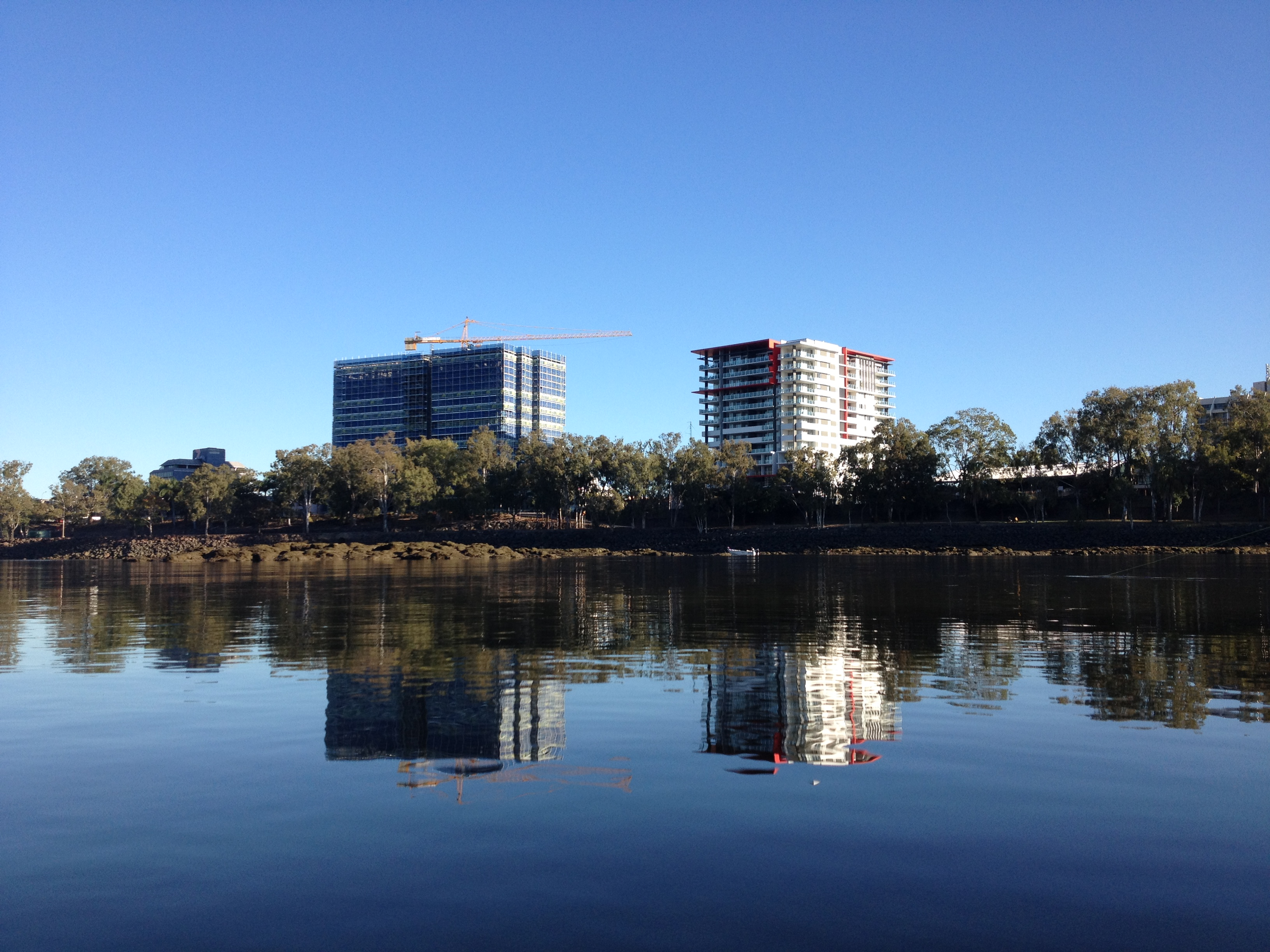
- Empire Apartments (Left), The Edge Apartments (Right)

- Interactive map of Rockhampton City
- Coordinates: 23.3811°S 150.5077°E
- Country: Australia
- State: Queensland
- City: Rockhampton
- LGA: Rockhampton Region
- Location: 619 km (385 mi) NNW of Brisbane

Government
  - State electorate: Rockhampton
  - Federal division: Capricornia

Area
  - Total: 2.5 km^{2} (0.97 sq mi)

Population
  - Total: 2,059 (2021 census)
  - Density: 824/km^{2} (2,130/sq mi)
- Time zone: UTC+10:00 (AEST)
- Postcode: 4700
Suburbs around Rockhampton City
| Wandal | Park Avenue | Berserker |
| The Range | Rockhampton City | The Common |
| Allenstown | Depot Hill | Depot Hill |

Rockhampton City is the central suburb of the city of Rockhampton in the Rockhampton Region of Queensland, Australia. It is also known as the Rockhampton CBD. In the 2021 census, Rockhampton City had a population of 2,059 people.

== Geography ==
Rockhampton City is a roughly rectangular suburb, bounded by the Fitzroy River to the north-east, North Street to the north-west, Murray Street to the south-west and South Street to the south-east. It is rectangular apart from the area excised for the Rockhampton railway station which interrupts the boundary on South Street.

Town Reach is the reach of the Fitzroy River beside the suburb (23.3819°S 150.5194°E).

== History ==
Rockhampton Congregational Church opened in Bolsover Street on Sunday 29 June 1862. The church could seat 250 people. On 23 September 1874, the foundation stone was laid for a new Congregational church by the Reverend Edward Griffith of Brisbane. The new church was officially opened on Sunday 29 October 1876. The new church was built in front of the old church and was the first brick-and-stone church in Rockhampton. It was built in the Gothic style and was 60 by 32 feet (18.3 by 9.8 m) in floor area with 16 to 17 feet (4.9 to 5.2 m) high ceilings. The walls were 14 inches (360 mm) thick and strengthened with external buttresses. The building was lit by gas and could seat 260 people.

In 1863, Father Charles Murlay and Miss Bridget Mary Ennis opened a Catholic school for girls and infants in Alma Street. A Catholic boys' school was opened on West Street in 1868. In 1873, the Sisters of Mercy came to Rockhampton took over the operation of the school for girls and infants which became known as St Patrick's School. On Sunday 17 June 1908, the Roman Catholic Bishop of Rockhampton, James Duhig, opened St Patrick's new school on the corner of Derby Street and Alma Street (approx 23.3830°S 150.5137°E). This school no longer exists, but the building was still on site in 1979.

Rockhampton Episcopalian (Anglican) Church opened on 15 March 1863. It was to have opened in January 1863 but there was a dispute between the churchwardens and the contractor over the safety of the building.

Rockhampton Primitive Methodist Church opened on Sunday 17 January 1864. It was on the corner of Fitzroy Street and Bolsover Street (approx 23.37717°S 150.51096°E).

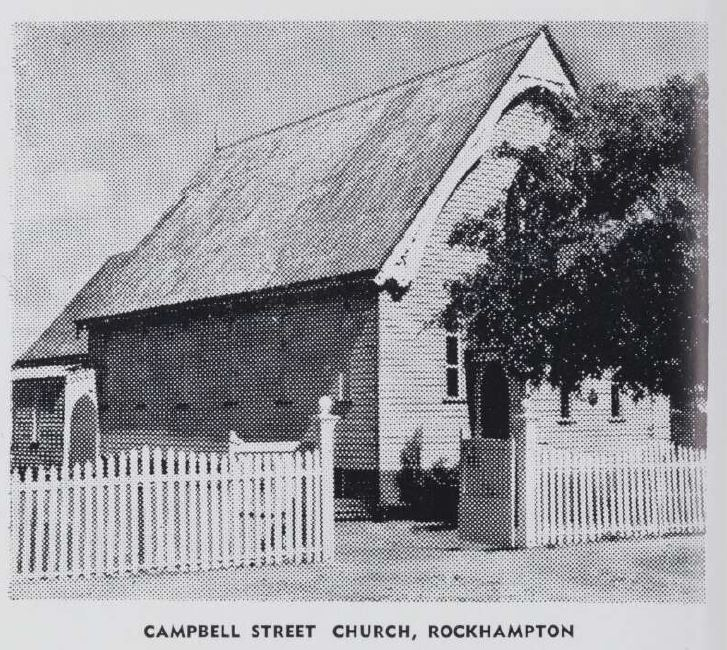
1881 Campbell Street Methodist Church with the 1871 Allenstown church at the rear, circa 1947

In May 1864, architect Joseph Douglass called for tenders to erect a Wesleyan Methodist church made from wood. The Rockhampton Wesleyan Church opened on Sunday 28 August 1864. It was in Kent Street. In November 1880, it was agreed that a new "central and substantial" church would be erected at an expected cost of £650, which would be funded in part by the sale of the Kent Street church and the Allenstown Wesleyan church. In January 1881, tenders were called to erect a new Wesleyan church at 300 Campbell Street. The new church was opened on Sunday 24 July 1881 by Reverend George Woolnough, President of the Wesleyan Conference. The building was 60 by 33 feet (18 by 10 m) in floor area and up to 60 feet (18 m) high and could seat about 300 people. The architect was Sydney Williams. The Allenstown Wesleyan church building was relocated to the rear of the new church at Campbell Street where it was used as a vestry and Sunday school. In 1959, the current brick church was built on the site of the 1881 church, becoming the Campbell Street Uniting Church (as a consequence of the 1977 amalgamation that created the Uniting Church in Australia.

On 18 October 1864, a Baptist Church opened in Denison Street. On Saturday 13 October 1906, a stump-capping ceremony was held for the new Rockhampton Baptist Tabernacle at a different location in Denison Street. In August 1917, the decision was made to relocate the Tabernacle to the corner of Campbell and Fitzroy streets, due to the disruption of the trains running along Denison Street during churches services. On Sunday 30 December 1917, the Tabernacle reopened in its new location facing Campbell Street . In 1977, a new church was built on the same site but facing Fitzroy Street (23.3800°S 150.5072°E). It closed in 2001 and is now a child care centre.

Rockhampton North Opportunity School opened on 28 July 1955. On 27 January 1976, it was renamed Rockhampton Special School.

Since 2005, Rockhampton City has seen many major developments with an extensive amount of construction taking place in the area, most notably the building of a number of riverside apartment buildings alongside the Fitzroy River.

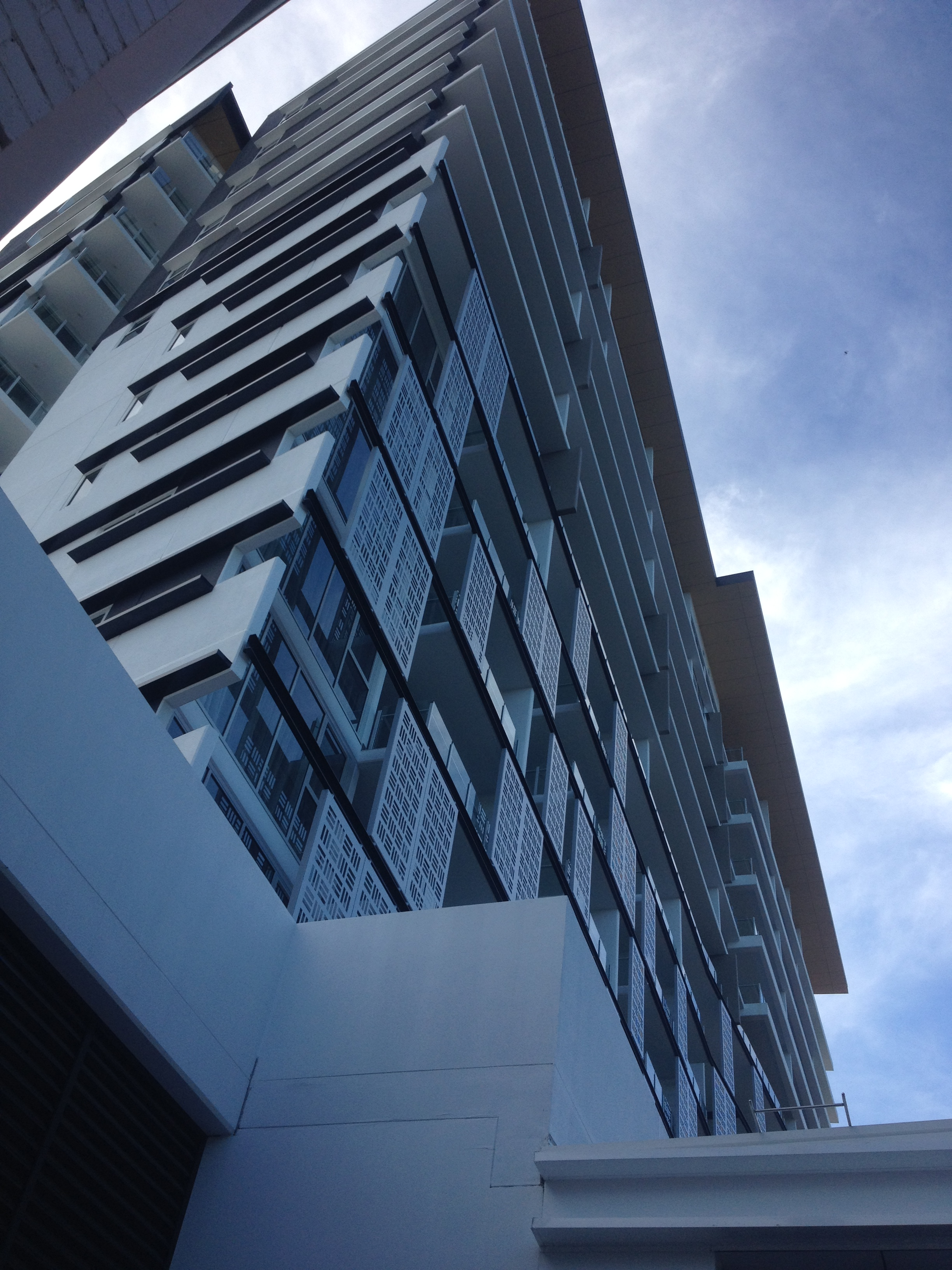
Empire Rockhampton

A number of apartment building were constructed in Victoria Parade including the Fitzroy Waterfront Apartments, The Rocks, The Edge, Quest, Southbank on Victoria, Empire, Gallery Apartments, and Skyview.

In 2009, The Edge opened as the tallest building in Central Queensland, being 12 storeys high. In 2014, Empire was topped out at 14 stories being several metres taller than The Edge. The $65 million development includes about 150 rooms, 5 star hotel lobby and reception, 3 ground level restaurants and 2 levels of under ground parking.

At the 2011 census, Rockhampton City had a population of 109,336 people.

In 2012, a new modern building was built on the corner of Fitzroy Street and East Street to house Stanwell Corporation and the National Australia Bank which replaced a dilapidated row of shops in what was known as "Churches Building".

In 2019, construction commenced on the new Rockhampton Museum of Art next to Customs House in Quay Street. Replacing the Rockhampton Art Gallery in Victoria Parade, it was opened in February 2022.

== Demographics ==
In the 2016 census, Rockhampton City had a population of 1,953 people.

In the 2021 census, Rockhampton City had a population of 2,059 people.

== Education ==
Rockhampton Special School is a primary and secondary (Preparatory to Year 12) special education school for boys and girls at 91–115 William Street (23.3827°S 150.5116°E). In 2018, the school had an enrolment of 63 students with 18 teachers (17 full-time equivalent) and 23 non-teaching staff (15 full-time equivalent).

There are no mainstream schools in the Rockhampton CBD. The nearest government primary schools are The Hall State School in neighbouring Wandal to the north-west, Allenstown State School in neighbouring Allenstown to the south-west and Depot Hill State School in neighbouring Depot Hill to the south. The nearest government secondary school is Rockhampton State High School in Wandal.

== East Street ==
The CBD is home to a traditional shopping strip in East Street often informally referred to as "The Mall" due to the area having previously been a pedestrian mall from 1987 until 2003, known as the City Heart Mall. East Street had always been the traditional retail hub of the city since European settlement, spanning two city blocks and consists of a variety of retail outlets, including food, fashion, shoes, homewares, chemists and banks.

The mall underwent a million dollar redevelopment in 2003 as part of the CBD beautification, which included the return of vehicular traffic to the mall. However, with the lack of an anchor tenant and ongoing issues surrounding the availability of parking, the mall has struggled to compete against the larger air-conditioned shopping centres which were built throughout other parts of the city during the 1980s and 1990s, such as Stockland Rockhampton, which house supermarkets, department stores and national retail chains. This also includes the nearby City Centre Plaza which is anchored by Coles and Target. Other contributing factors to the mixed success of the East Street area includes the high cost of rent, mining downturns, droughts and cyclones.

Heritage-listed buildings along East Street include the former Rockhampton Post Office and the historic Rockhampton Courthouses. From 1909 until 1939, Rockhampton's steam trams were a commonly seen form of public transport in the CBD.

== Riverbank ==
One of Rockhampton City's most recognisable features is the Fitzroy Riverbank and a well-known strip of heritage-listed buildings in Quay Street, mostly built in the late 19th century, including Customs House.

A multimillion-dollar Rockhampton Riverbank Revitalisation plan was released in 2015. The newly revitalised riverbank precinct was officially opened in 2018 with a new zero-depth water play area, improved boardwalks and seating areas in an open plaza area named in honour of Rod Laver, a new restaurant which extends out over the river and the newly built Fitzroy Adventure Playground.

Quay Street between William and Fitzroy Street was paved and changed from a two-way thoroughfare to a shared space with one-way traffic. Controversy arose over the rapid deterioration of the pavers laid in Quay Street, not long after the opening of the redevelopment.

== Facilities ==
Rockhampton City is home to many regional offices of many private companies as well as various government organisations, who use the suburb as a hub for Central Queensland. This includes Rockhampton Regional Council which administer local government services from City Hall in Bolsover Street. Locally based state and federal politicians also have offices located throughout the Rockhampton CBD.

The regional bases of the Queensland Police Service, the Queensland Ambulance Service and the Queensland Fire and Rescue Service are all based in the Rockhampton CBD.

Many of Central Queensland's media organisations are based in Rockhampton City. ABC Capricornia, 4RO and Triple M all broadcast their local programs from studios located either in Quay Street or Victoria Parade. Local newsrooms for regional television networks, WIN Television, Seven Queensland and Southern Cross 10 are also located in the CBD.

The local newspaper office for Rockhampton's daily newspaper, The Morning Bulletin remains in the CBD although it's now located in Bolsover Street after moving out of the heritage-listed Bulletin Building in Quay Street in 2014 after being there since 1927.

== Amenities ==
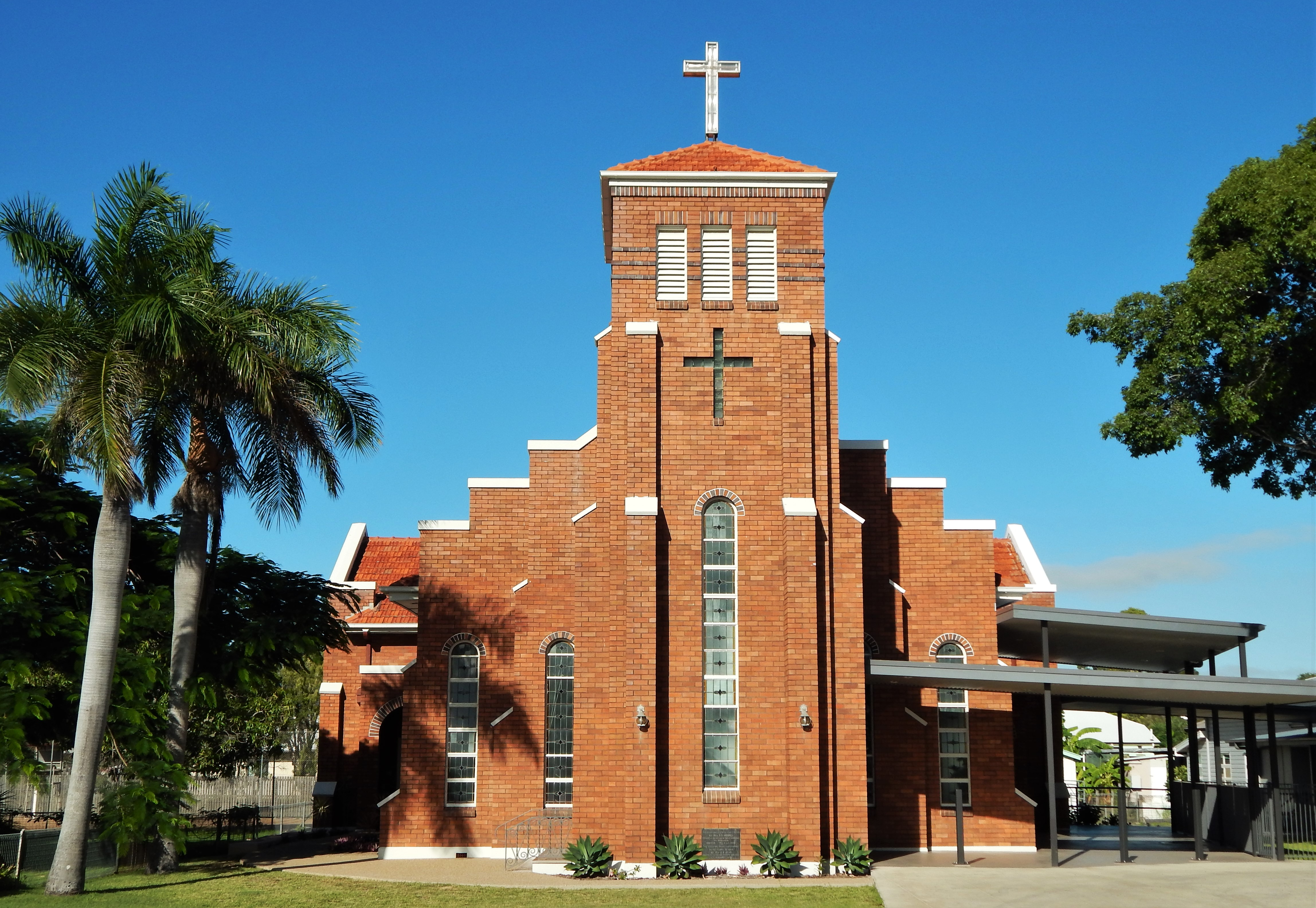
Rockhampton South Uniting Church, 2020

Rockhampton South Uniting Church is at 300–316 Cambell Street (23.38434°S 150.50936°E).

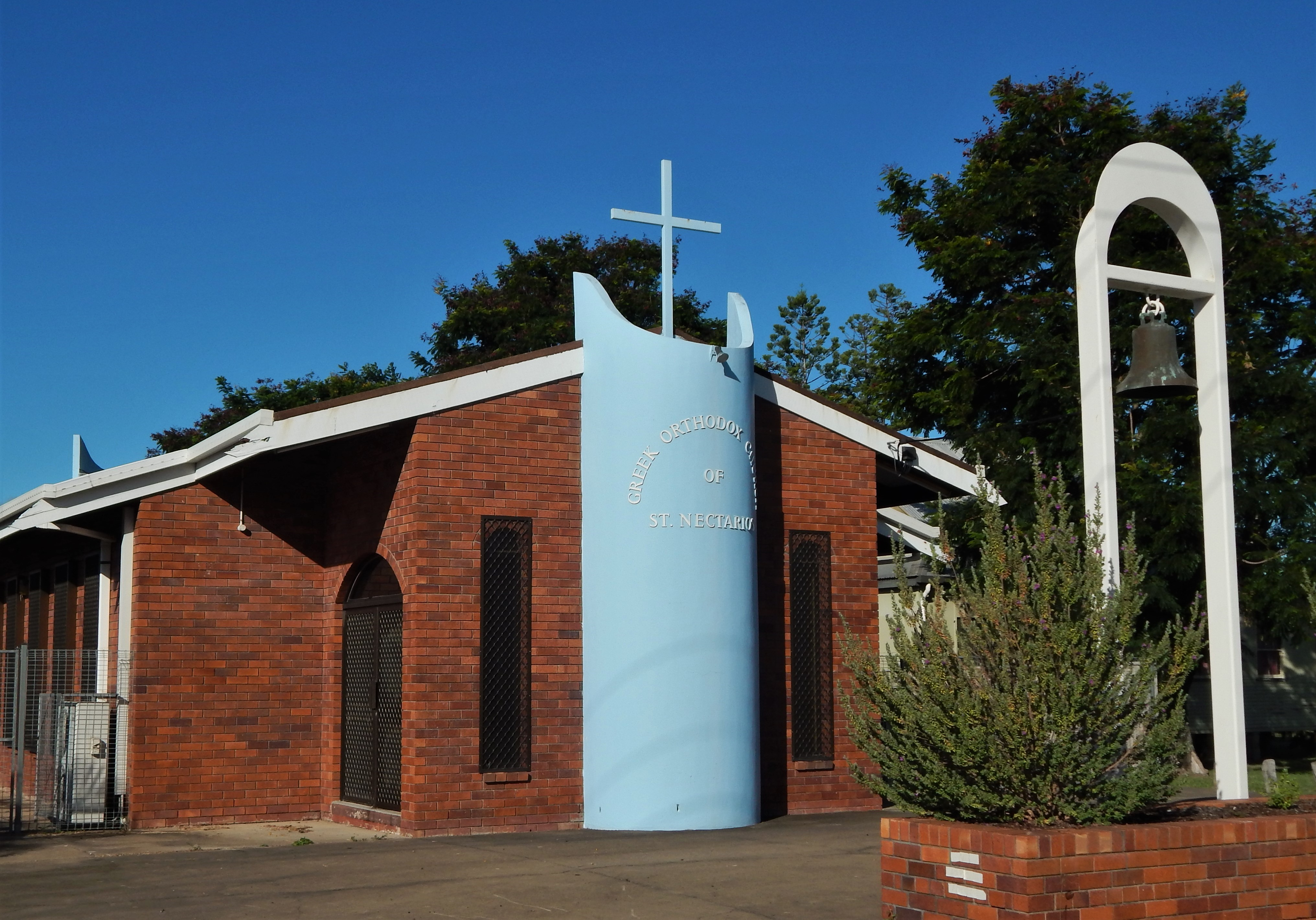
St Nektarios' Greek Orthodox Church, 2020

St Nektarios' Greek Orthodox Church is at 111 Kent Street (23.3787°S 150.5076°E). Their feast day is 9 November.

=== Parks ===
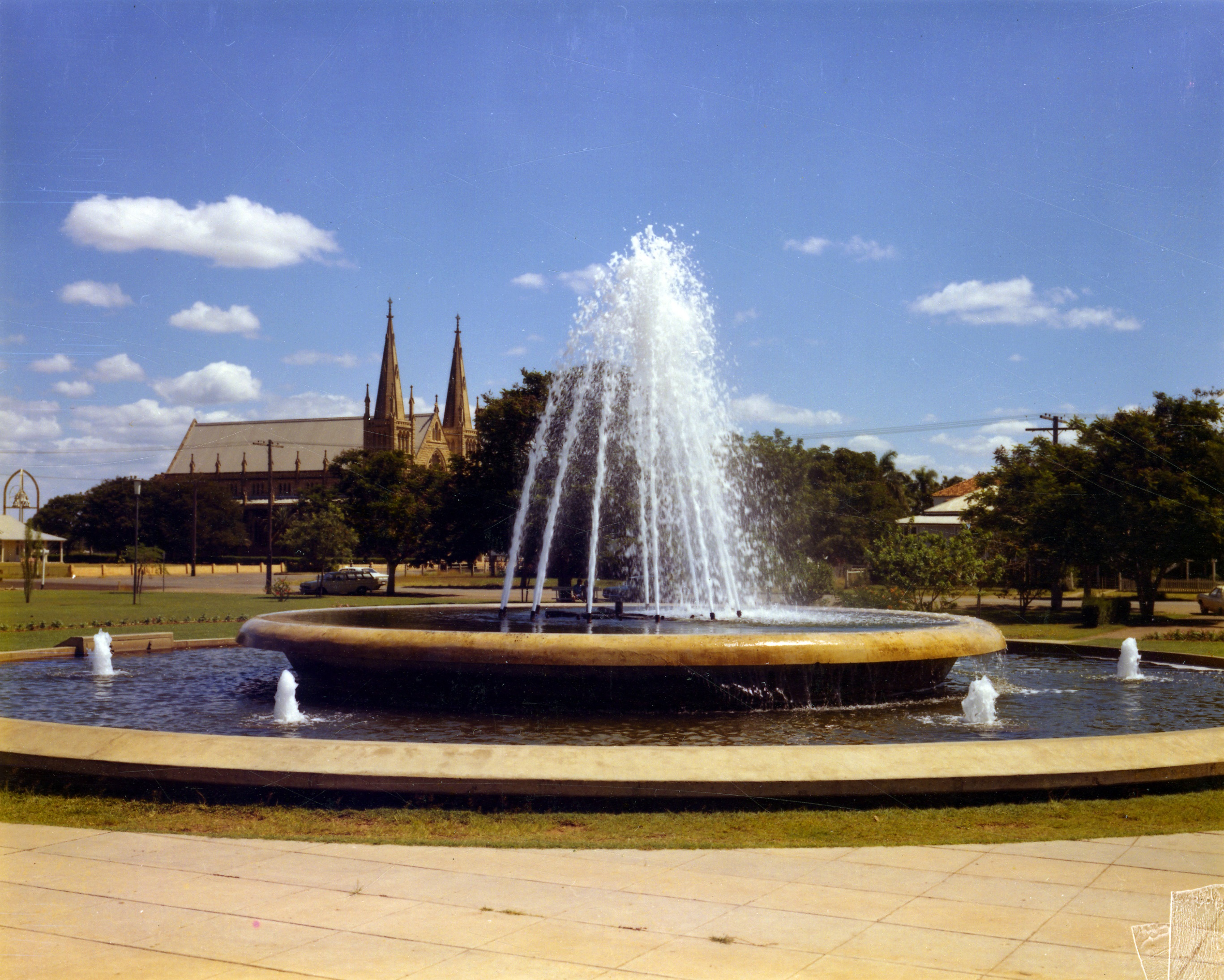
Water fountain in Central Park, 1974

There are a number of parks in the CBD, including:

- Brown Park Rugby League Ground (23.3767°S 150.5018°E)
- Central Park (23.3836°S 150.5069°E)
- Col Brown Park (23.3701°S 150.5079°E)
- Goss Park (23.3853°S 150.5083°E)
- Jeffries Park (23.3726°S 150.5056°E)
- Kingel Park (23.3787°S 150.5081°E)
- Leichhardt Park (23.3758°S 150.5043°E)
- Quay Street Park (23.3845°S 150.5201°E)
- Toonooba Park (23.3821°S 150.5180°E)

The Rainbow Fountain is in Central Park. It is illuminated at night.

== Events ==
Throughout the 2010s, a number of annual events were either established in Rockhampton City or relocated to the area from other parts of the city.

The inaugural CBD Christmas Fair was held in East Street in 2013 and has since been held each year, usually around late November or early December. The event has become known for culminating in the lighting of the City Christmas Tree. In 2018, the tree was relocated from the roundabout at the intersection of East and Denham Street to the riverbank where it now usually stands in front of Customs House in Quay Street.

Similarly, the inaugural Rockhampton River Festival, an arts and cultural event, was held in Rockhampton City in 2015, and has since become annual event held each July in the CBD.

In 2019, both the annual Rockhampton Emergency Services Day and the Rockhampton Cultural Festival were located to the CBD after having been held at the Rockhampton Heritage Village for many years.

The Rocky River Run was relocated to the riverside precinct in 2017 after having been held in Wandal since its inception in 2008.

The annual Anzac Day march proceeds through the city and now concludes with a morning service at Rod Laver Plaza, which was previously held at City Hall.

== Big Bulls ==
Rockhampton Art Gallery in Rockhampton City is home to one of the seven Big Bulls statues that decorate Rockhampton, which regards itself as the Beef Capital of Australia. Unlike the other bull statues which are intended as realistic depiction of different breeds of cattle, the "Under the Hammer" statue was created as an artwork. The Big Bulls are listed as one of Australia's big things.
