= ABC Radio Brisbane =

4QR

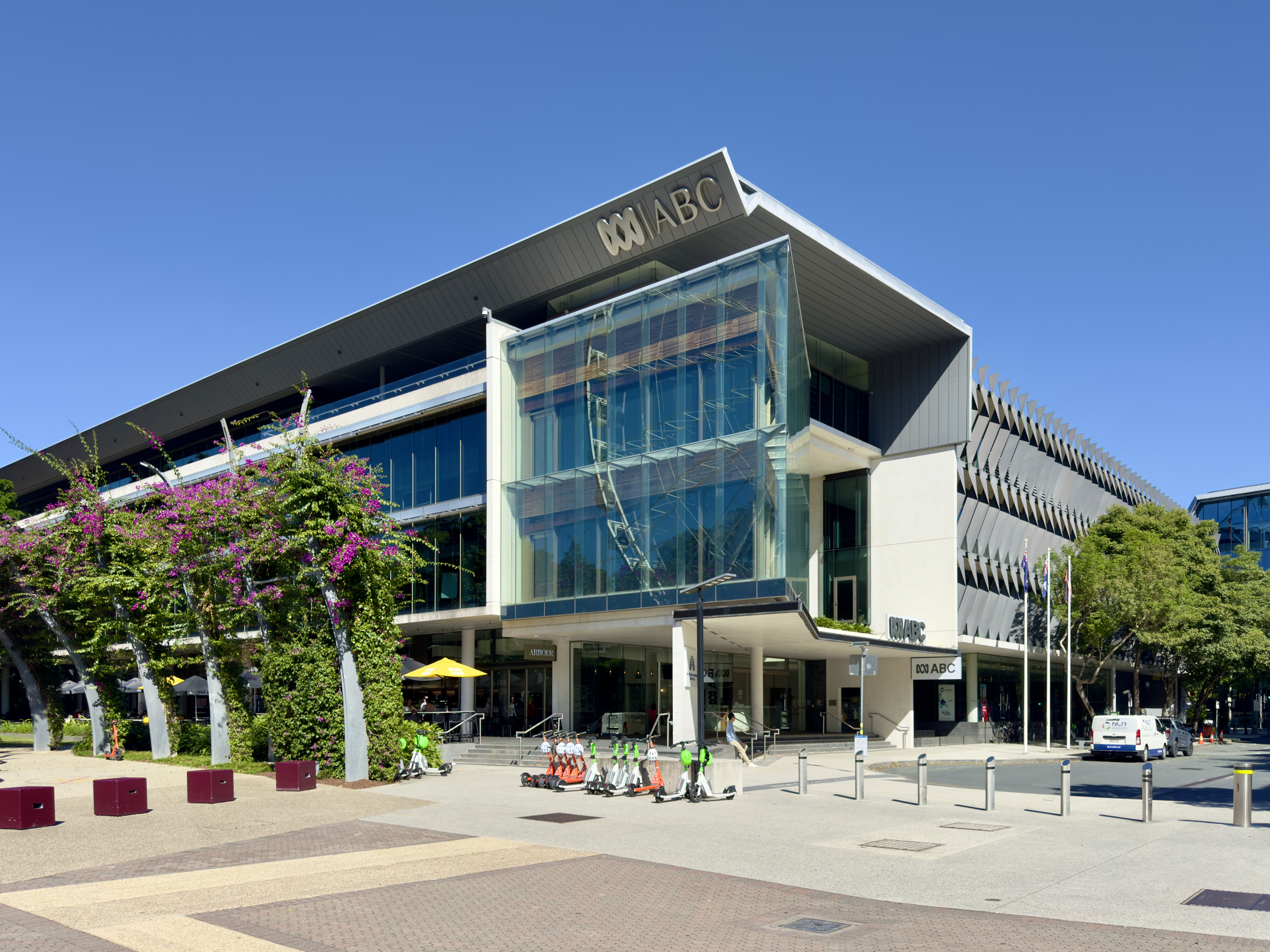
- Brisbane, Queensland; Australia
- Broadcast area: Brisbane & Ipswich
- Frequency: 612 kHz AM (also on DAB+)
- Branding: ABC Radio Brisbane

Programming
- Language: English
- Format: Talk
- Affiliations: ABC Local Radio

Ownership
- Owner: Australian Broadcasting Corporation
- Sister stations: 4RN, 4ABCFM, 4JJJ, 4PB

History
- First air date: 7 January 1938

Technical information
- Licensing authority: Australian Communications and Media Authority
- Power: 50,000 watts
- Transmitter coordinates: 27°18′42″S 153°1′3″E

Links
- Website: www.abc.net.au/brisbane/

ABC Brisbane Centre

General information
- Status: Completed
- Type: Radio station Media production studio
- Location: Brisbane, Australia, Russell Street, South Brisbane
- Construction started: February 2010
- Completed: January 2012
- Client: Australian Broadcasting Corporation

Technical details
- Floor count: 4 plus basement
- Floor area: 15,435 m^{2} (166,141 sq ft)

Design and construction
- Architecture firm: Richard Kirk Architect
- Structural engineer: Cardno
- Services engineer: Aurecon, WSP Group
- Other designers: Arup
- Main contractor: Leighton Contractors

References
- Richard Kirk Architect

612 ABC Brisbane (callsign: 4QR) is an ABC Local Radio station in Brisbane, Queensland. It is one of the largest stations in the network, serving as a base for Queensland programming – many programs are broadcast across the ABC Local Radio network in regional and rural areas of Queensland when those stations are not carrying local programming.

== General history ==
Radio broadcasting began in Brisbane in 1925 when the Government of Queensland commenced its own broadcasting operations with the callsign 4QG – 4 denoted the state of Queensland; QG stood for Queensland Government. 4QG became a part of the ABC's radio network at its inception in 1932.

The ABC started a second Brisbane station on 7 January 1938, using the callsign 4QR. The new station carried national programming—the forerunner of Radio National—while 4QG aired mainly local content. On 28 July 1963, the two stations quietly switched schedules, with 4QR becoming the local outlet for Brisbane while 4QG picked up the national schedule. ABC officials wanted to minimise interruptions of regular programming by parliamentary sessions. 4QG now operates under the callsign 4RN, in common with all other Radio National services in Queensland.

Until December 2006, 612 ABC Brisbane's studios were located at 600 Coronation Drive in the Brisbane inner-city suburb of Toowong. A number of breast cancer cases at the ABC's Toowong studios led to the permanent evacuation of the entire site in December 2006 with 350 staff, from ABC television, radio and online relocated. For the next five years, the station broadcast from an office building in Lissner Street, Toowong. In January 2012, 612 ABC Brisbane moved to a newly built facility in South Bank. The old Coronation Drive site was sold to Sunland Group in 2014 and subsequently demolished.

In September 2006, 612 ABC Brisbane was "host radio broadcaster" for naturalist Steve Irwin's memorial service at Australia Zoo, Beerwah. Breakfast announcers Spencer Howson (from 612 ABC Brisbane) and John Stokes (from the ABC Sunshine Coast station) were chosen to host the broadcast, made available to radio stations around the world.

The ABC Brisbane Centre, which was designed by Richard Kirk and built by Leighton Contractors, opened in 2012.

== Technical history ==
Radio 4QR commenced operation on 7 January 1938.

At commencement the station was owned by the Commonwealth of Australia and under the legislation of the day required no licence. The Postmaster-General's Department maintained the transmission system and the station's studios, while the Australian Broadcasting Commission (subsequently Australian Broadcasting Corporation from 1 July 1983) created the programme content to be transmitted. A licence was issued for the first time in 1992 in accordance with the newly legislated Broadcasting Services Act.

Initially it operated on a frequency of 940 kHz within the then current 10 kHz channel spacing plan. On 1 September 1948 the station changed frequency to 590 kHz to accord with a revised Australia / New Zealand 10 kHz channel spacing plan which involved many changes to Australian station frequencies, particularly those in Queensland and New South Wales. In 1972/1973 the 4QR frequency was changed slightly to 580 kHz. Finally, on 24 November 1978 the frequency was changed to 612 kHz to accord with the 9 kHz channel spacing plan which had been agreed by Australia at Geneva in 1975 ("The 1975 Geneva Agreement").

Station 4QR has seen several power increases since its commencement, both to increase its coverage area and to ameliorate increasing levels of man-made radio noise and night-time skywave interference levels. Initial operation was at 500 Watts. Power was increased to 1 kW in 1942/1943 and again to 2 kW in 1944/1945 to support the many military personnel in Brisbane during World War II. Power was increased to 10 kW in 1948/1949 and finally to 50 kW in 1962/1963.

At the time of initial establishment Radio 4QR operated from a city location. For many years now Radio 4QR has shared (with Radio 4QG, now 4RN) a tall dual anti-fading guyed and sectionalised vertical radiator of 198 metres AGL with structural capacitative top hat located at Bald Hills on the northern outskirts of Brisbane. The mast is a very prominent feature visible from major highways in the vicinity. There is a shorter (81 metres AGL) vertical guyed radiator on the site which provides a standby capability during main antenna maintenance.

On 7 March 2025, at 3pm AEST, 612 ABC Brisbane began simulcasting onto 106.1 FM in Brisbane, the frequency normally occupied by ABC Classic, in order to reach more listeners with rolling coverage of TC Alfred. Listeners of the classical music station in the area were instructed to tune via their TV, on DAB+ or online in order to continue listening to ABC Classic. On 9 March 2025, the ABC's Bald Hills Radiator AM transmitter was knocked off-air after heavy storms and flash flooding struck the Queensland capital, resulting in a loss of access to ABC Local Radio, Radio National and ABC NewsRadio in Brisbane. This meant that 106.1 FM became the ABC's official emergency broadcaster in the area. The AM services were later restored that same day. On 11 March 2025, at 5pm AEST, 612 ABC Brisbane ended its simulcast onto 106.1 FM as the Cyclone Alfred emergency came to an end and attention turned to recovery. The frequency used for the simulcast was reverted to ABC Classic that same day.

== Local programs ==
Breakfast is heard on 612 ABC Brisbane each weekday between 5am and 7:45am, and features news, sports, weather forecasts, financial information, discussions about the day's news and live traffic reports. ABC News bulletins are broadcast throughout the program on the half-hour from 5am until 8am. The program has won numerous ratings surveys in the Brisbane radio market throughout recent years.

Spencer Howson presented the program for fifteen years, 1997-2000 and 2006–16. In November 2016, Howson announced he was stepping down from hosting the breakfast show. In December 2016, it was announced that Queensland Country Hour presenter Craig Zonca would be the new host of the station's breakfast show commencing in 2017. In December 2017, ABC announced that Rebecca Levingston would join Craig Zonca to host Breakfast from January 2018.

In yet another on-air shakeup, Rebecca Levingston claimed the coveted Mornings slot from January 2019, and Zonca was paired with Loretta Ryan, relegating Emma Griffiths to Weekend Mornings.

Mornings is broadcast from 8:30am until 11:00am with the first 30 minutes devoted to the main news stories of the day. Prime ministers, premiers and other politicians will lobby to be interviewed in this first half-hour. After 9:00am talkback callers are encouraged to contribute to the day's debate. Mornings has proved almost as controversial as the stories normally covered on the local current affairs show. Several people have presented the show over the years with their departure often making headlines.

Recent presenters have been Steve Austin (2011–2017), Madonna King (2006–2011), Steve Austin (2004–2005), Kirsten Macgregor (2003), Susan Mitchell (2002), Andrew Carroll (2000–2001), Cathy Border (2000), John Barton, Carolyn Tucker (1998–1999), Anna Reynolds and Rod Henshaw. In 2002, the ABC was forced to apologise to Andrew Carroll and admit he was unfairly sacked. Carroll was taken off-air after commenting, during an interview with Queensland Premier Peter Beattie, that he would have to "reconsider the terms of his contract" (or similar). Carroll's story was featured on the ABC's own media watchdog program Media Watch. In October 2011, King announced that she would be leaving the station to spend more time with her children.

In December 2011, Steve Austin was announced as King's replacement. In December 2017, ABC announced that Breakfast with Craig Zonca and Rebecca Levingston would extend to 10am and a new show Focus Brisbane with Emma Griffiths will replace the Mornings show. In 2019, further changes saw the Brisbane Focus program discontinued - and the Mornings resumed with Rebecca Levingston as host.

Afternoons is broadcast on 612 ABC Brisbane between 12.30pm and 3.30pm and is presented by Katherine Feeney. Between 12.30pm and 1.30pm the program is only heard on 612 ABC Brisbane and ABC Gold Coast. From 1.30pm to 3.00pm the program is statewide on the ABC Local Radio Queensland network. Between 3.00pm and 3.30pm the program is only heard on 612 ABC Brisbane.

Drive is heard between 3.30pm and 6:30pm and is presented by Ellen Fanning.

Evenings is heard from 7pm until 10pm Monday to Thursday and is simulcast on the regional ABC Local Radio Queensland network. Due to daylight saving time, the show is only broadcast from 7pm until 9pm during summer months. On Fridays, a national edition of Evenings hosted by Christine Anu is heard. Former ABC News television presenter David Curnow was appointed host of Evenings in late 2013. However, in December 2017, ABC announced that Kelly Higgins-Devine would replace David Curnow from January 2018.

Saturday Breakfast is broadcast between 6am and 7:45am each week with Spencer Howson. The first hour of the program is dedicated to taking talkback calls with Gardening questions.

Sunday Mornings is broadcast between 10am and 12pm on Sundays with Sally Rope. The program is simulcast on the ABC Local Radio Queensland's regional network between 10am and midday.

612 ABC Brisbane is managed by Local Manager Anthony Frangi and Content Director Matthew Connors.

== The Bradley ==
The Bradley is an annual art competition run by 612 ABC Brisbane since 2022 where the public is invited to create an artwork about the year's chosen subject.

Year	Subject	Winner	Ref.
2022	Brad Hunter	Andrew Weil	
2023	Jenny Woodward	Carol Owens	
2024	Costa Georgiadis	Cat Jardine	
