= Steve Austin (radio presenter) =

Australian radio presenter

- Born: 1960 or 1961 (age 65–66); Melbourne, Victoria, Australia
- Education: Deakin University
- Occupation: radio presenter
- Known for: hosting radio programs on ABC Radio Brisbane
- Notable work: Mornings; Drive

Stephen Austin (born 1960 or 1961) is an Australian radio presenter who is best known for his lengthy tenure hosting various programs on ABC Radio Brisbane.

== Early life ==
Austin was born at Epworth Hospital in the Melbourne suburb of Richmond.

He attended Syndal South Primary School, Caulfield Grammar School and Syndal Technical School.

In the 1970s, he relocated with his parents to Nambour, Queensland where he worked in a number of jobs including as a pineapple picker, a waiter and as a worker in an electrical warehouse.

== Career ==
Austin commenced as a volunteer broadcaster at Brisbane community stations 4ZZZ and 4RPH in 1984, and completed a diploma at the Australian Institute of Radio and Television Production.

He relocated to Townsville where he was a presenter for ABC North Queensland for seven years.

Upon his return to Brisbane, he worked at ABC TV as a researcher and producer on the local edition of The 7.30 Report, before becoming the inaugural producer of Stateline Queensland.

Austin ultimately returned to radio as a presenter on ABC Radio Brisbane and has since hosted a variety of programs including Mornings, Drive and Evenings while also serving as the station's program director.

Austin departed the station on extended leave at the end of 2007, returning to the station in 2012.

Upon Austin's return to the station's Mornings program, Queensland deputy premier Andrew Fraser refused to appear on the regular "Party Games" segment after taking umbrage at a discussion Austin had moderated about sand mining on Stradbroke Island.

During a panel discussion in 2015, Austin described terrorist Osama bin Laden as an “honoured and respected shiek” and claimed reports of pornography found in bin Laden's bunker were due to a “public relations smear”. The ABC defended Austin and said his comments were referencing bin Laden's reputation in his own community rather than it being a personal judgement. However, Austin's comments were criticised by Queensland senator James McGrath during a Senate Estimates hearing.

In 2018, ABC Radio Brisbane extended its breakfast program to 10am and introduced a new morning program called Focus Brisbane, hosted by Emma Griffiths. As a result, Austin was moved to the station's Drive program. This was a move which was credited by Sydney broadcaster Ray Hadley as helping the ratings of The Ray Hadley Morning Show, heard in Brisbane on 4BC. Hadley described Austin as “a proven performer”.

In 2022, Austin claimed his Twitter account had been interfered with by LGBTIQ activists who were angered by a scheduled interview with a businesswoman who opposed new laws regarding birth certificates listing gender diverse people. Screenshots of Austin's account were published, appearing to show that he had “liked” videos of transgender pornography. This prompted Austin to deactivate his profile and for the ABC to conduct an internal investigation.

In December 2023, it was confirmed that Austin would be returning as the host of Mornings.

Throughout his time hosting programs on ABC Radio Brisbane, Austin has interviewed every sitting Australian prime minister since the early 2000s including John Howard, Kevin Rudd, Julia Gillard, Tony Abbott, Malcolm Turnbull, Scott Morrison and Anthony Albanese.
