= Spencer Howson =

Australian radio presenter (born 1972)

Dubbed ABC Radio's "favourite son" Spencer Howson (born 9 March 1972 in England) is an Australian radio presenter.

He was the host of Breakfast on 612 ABC Brisbane and when he resigned he had worked for the ABC for 25 years.

== Career 1990-2016 ==
Howson's family migrated to Australia in 1981, settling in Brisbane. He obtained a Bachelor of Business (Communication) – Journalism (1989–1991) at the Queensland University of Technology.

Spencer's first radio experience was at Brisbane community station 4RPH, part of the Australia-wide Radio Print Handicapped Network, from 1990 to 1993. In 1991, at the age of 19, Spencer was elected vice president of the 4RPH board of directors. After an absence of 26 years, he returned to the 4RPH board in February 2019 and served as President from November 2019 until July 2021.

Howson joined ABC Local Radio in the Queensland city of Rockhampton in 1993 and stayed until 1995. He co-produced programmes presented by Andrew Lofthouse and David Anderson as well as presenting the Friday breakfast shift on 4RK (now re-branded as ABC Capricornia). In 1994, when Andrew Lofthouse moved to Brisbane, Spencer took over 4RK's 8.30 am – 11 am shift. The first 15 minutes was a current affairs round-up, networked across regional Queensland.

In 1995 and 1996, Spencer fronted the regional statewide 2–4 pm shift. The programme emanated from Rockhampton until the end of June 1995. Spencer then moved back to Brisbane, whence he continued to present the statewide regional 2–4 pm shift. From 1997 to 2000, Howson presented the 4QR (now re-branded 612 ABC Brisbane) Breakfast Show. In 2001, he returned to his afternoon slot, this time broadcasting into Brisbane as well as regional Queensland.

In 2004 and 2005, Howson hosted the 612 ABC Brisbane 4–6 pm "Late Afternoon Show". He was named ABC Local Radio "Broadcaster of the Year" in 2005.

At the beginning of 2006 Howson returned to the 5 am – 7.45 am Breakfast shift. By the end of the year, the programme was No. 1 in Brisbane. It was the first time since 1984 that 612 ABC Brisbane (formerly 612 4QR) had topped the coveted Breakfast ratings.

In May 2007, Spencer was listed in the inaugural Queensland edition of "Who's Who". The book "recognises and reveres" the 4,000 Queenslanders from the arts, community, business, sports, entertainment, rural, environment, medicine, science, media and politics "who have helped make Queensland what it is today".

In July 2007, Howson joined a "roster" of fill-in presenters back-filling the maternity leave of Jillian Whiting on the Nine Network television show Extra.

== Resignation ==
In November 2016, Spencer announced that he would be leaving his coveted breakfast show, but will stay with 612 ABC Brisbane. He had been the presenter of the Breakfast shift for fifteen years, 1997-2000 and 2006-2016. In December 2016, it was announced that Spencer would be replaced by Queensland Country Hour presenter, Craig Zonca as the host of the station's breakfast program in 2017.

On 6 January 2017 Howson announced that he had officially resigned from the ABC. He had worked for the ABC for 25 years.

== Career 2017- ==
In February 2017 Howson announced that he would join event podcasting company Pop Up Radio. Founded in 2015, Pop Up Radio provided live-broadcasts of conferences, events and trade shows online. Howson also wrote a daily news email The Gateway for newspaper The Brisbane Times. The service launched on 6 February 2017 was written in a conversational style and was sent each morning at 8:30 a.m.

Along with this, Howson began tutoring radio students at University of Southern Queensland Springfield campus, becoming Lecturer (Radio Production) from 2021. He returned to the ABC as Program Quality Advisor 2017-2020. And he has worked as a radio consultant for Jillian Whiting and Suzanne Stark's Brisbane-based media training company Media Potential, initially from 2018-2020 and again from 2024.

Howson joined the Nine Radio-owned conservative-focused radio station 4BC in January 2021 for the 9-1pm shift on Saturday and Sundays. In 2023, his producers were Brooke Seychell and Sam Leckie, who doubled as Spencer’s sports reporter. His other producers at 4BC included Brett Debritz (2021-22), Aiden Taylor (2022), and Chloe Gowdie (2023). Spencer left 4BC in December 2023.

In June 2024, Howson returned to ABC Radio Brisbane to present the Afternoon show during the winter ratings break. He hosted the Evening show during the September ratings break. From July-October 2024, he presented Saturday Breakfast on 91.7 ABC Gold Coast. He returned to his old ABC Brisbane Breakfast timeslot for twelve days in the lead up to Christmas 2024.

January-June 2025, Spencer hosted the Saturday Breakfast show on ABC Brisbane. Parts of the show were also heard on ABC Gold Coast, Sunshine Coast, Southern Queensland, Wide Bay, Western Queensland and North-West Queensland. In the July 2025 winter ratings break, he filled in for Ellen Fanning on 612 ABC Brisbane “Drive”.

== Private life ==
Howson was born in England but has lived in Brisbane since 1979. He attended primary schools at Bald Hills, Toowong and Manly. High School was Brisbane Grammar and he then attended the Queensland University of Technology. He married his wife, Nikki, on Mount Coot-tha in June 1996 and they have a son Jack born in 2000. In 2021, Howson completed a Master of Arts (Creative Arts) at University of Southern Queensland, researching attitudes towards female radio presenters. In 2024, he began his PhD at Griffith University, studying the importance of local radio to listeners in regional Australia. Away from work and study, Howson enjoys red wine, model trains and spending time with his cats.

== Awards ==
2005 ABC Local Radio "Broadcaster of the Year"

2006 won the ratings slot for Breakfast Radio for the first time. Spencer won the Brisbane Breakfast radio ratings 45 times between 2006 and 2016.
