= Craig Zonca =

Australian radio and television presenter

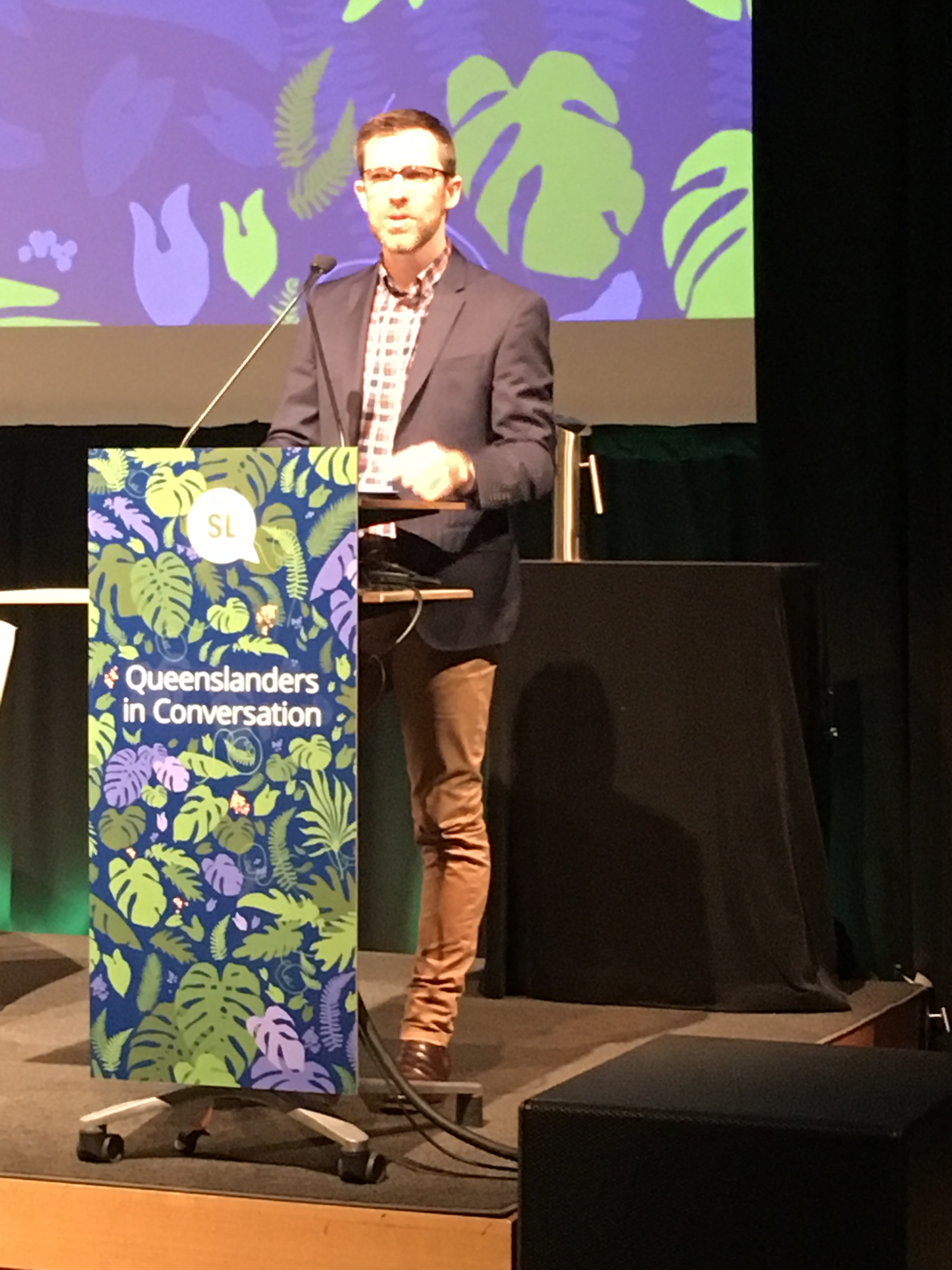
Craig Zonca at State Library of Queensland, 2018.jpg

Craig Zonca is an Australian radio and television presenter.

He is currently a breakfast presenter on ABC Radio Brisbane and a weather presenter on ABC Television.

After presenting the Queensland edition of The Country Hour for several years, Zonca was announced as ABC Radio Brisbane's new breakfast presenter to replace long-serving host Spencer Howson in late 2016.

In late 2017, it was announced Zonca would co-present the program in 2018 alongside Rebecca Levingston. Levingston was later replaced in that time slot by fellow presenter Loretta Ryan.

Since his time hosting the program, Zonca has maintained a healthy audience share for the program in a much-publicised ratings battle with the breakfast program on commercial rival Nova 106.9.

== Personal life ==
Zonca grew up in Rockhampton where he began his radio career with ABC Capricornia. He also completed a Bachelor of Business (Management) degree at CQUniversity in 2006.

In 2019, Zonca married ABC journalist Jessica Hinchliffe.
