= 4BC =

Radio station in Brisbane, Queensland, Australia

- Brisbane, Queensland; Australia
- Broadcast area: Brisbane; Gold Coast; Sunshine Coast; Ipswich
- Frequency: 882 kHz DAB Digital

Programming
- Language: English
- Format: News talk

Ownership
- Owner: Tapt Media; (Radio 4BC Brisbane Pty Ltd)
- Sister stations: 2GB; 3AW; 6PR

History
- First air date: 16 August 1930; 96 years ago
- Call sign meaning: Brisbane Chandlers or from JB Chandler, original licensee

Technical information
- Licensing authority: Australian Communications and Media Authority
- Power: 5 kW
- Transmitter coordinates: 27.4642°S 153.1480°E

Links
- Webcast: Windows Media iHeartRadio stream
- Website: 4bc.com.au

4BC is a radio station in Brisbane, Queensland, owned by Tapt Media. It broadcasts on 882 kHz AM and is Brisbane's only commercial talkback station.

While the station's broadcasting facility is at Cannon Hill, its transmitting tower is located in Wynnum West.

On Friday, 8 October 2021, 4BC moved to 882 kHz, which was used by its sister station, 4BH, which moved to 1116 kHz.

== History ==
4BC was one of the first radio stations in Brisbane. It was established in 1930 by John Beals Chandler, an electrical appliance retailer and later Lord Mayor of Brisbane. In March 1937 the station was sold for £A50,000 (equivalent to $9.3 million in 2022) to the Australian Broadcasting Company who took control in April.

The station changed owners multiple times before being brought by Southern Cross Broadcasting (later Fairfax Radio).

The original studio was located in the Wintergarden Building in Queen St and in 1954 the station moved to the corner of Wharf and Adelaide St into what was originally a vinegar factory. The original transmitter site was located at Fig Tree Pocket and was a two tower 5 kW directional array. In 1988 the studio was relocated to 30 Macrossan St and that installation included a K_{u} band satellite uplink for the first time. In 2004 the station moved from its CBD location at 30 Macrossan Street to new purpose-built premises at Cannon Hill in 2004. Fairfax acquired ownership in 2007.

In mid-2022, former 4KQ breakfast team Laurel, Gary and Mark joined the station's weekday breakfast slot.

In September 2024, after two years of being on air in the breakfast slot, breakfast team Laurel, Gary and Mark departed the station after a series of low ratings. Peter Fegan took over as Breakfast presenter.

== Programming ==
In December 2013, 4BC management unveiled an almost complete replacement of on-air talent for 2014. Most continued into early 2015. However, in April 2015, management announced a number of programs would be immediately axed, and a number of announcing staff made redundant, following the merger of Fairfax Radio Network and Macquarie Radio Network. These included long-time presenter and newsreader Walter Williams, Loretta Ryan, Ian Skippen, and former Seven News reporter Patrick Condren.

Prior to April 2015, 4BC produced all of its own programming, including a Queensland-wide morning program, from Brisbane which were presented by local announcers. In April 2015, most of those programs were axed with the exception of one local afternoon drive show.

In 2020, local programming returned to the station. On May 15, Neil Breen was announced as presenter of Breakfast, following Alan Jones' retirement from 2GB. It marked a return to local programming for the first time since 2018.

== Program times (in AEST format) ==
=== Weekdays ===
- Overnights with Phil O'Neill | 12:00am (Midnight) – 5:30am (Simulcast from 2GB)
- Breakfast with Jason Matthews | 5:30am – 9:00am
- Mornings with Gary Hardgrave | 9:00am – 12:00pm (Noon)
- Afternoons with Michael McLaren | 12:00pm (Noon) – 3:00pm (Simulcast from 2GB)
- 4BC Drive with Carla Bignasca | 3:00pm – 6:00pm
- Sports Today with Adam Hawse | 6:00pm – 7:00pm (Monday to Thursday) (Simulcast from 2GB)
- Money News | 7:00pm – 8:00pm (Monday to Thursday) (Simulcast Nationally)
- Nights with John Stanley | 8:00pm – 12:00am (Midnight) (Simulcast from 2GB)

=== Weekends ===
- Overnights with Pat Panetta 12:00am (Midnight) – 5:00am (Simulcast from 2GB)
- The Garden Clinic with Graham Ross & Sandra Ross – 6:00am – 8:00am (Simulcast from 2GB)
- Life & Technology with Charlie Brown | 8:00am – 9:00am (Saturday Mornings) (Simulcast Nationally)
- The House of Wellness | 8:00am – 9:00am (Sunday Mornings) (Simulcast Nationally)
- Weekends with Luke Grant | 9:00am – 1:00pm (Simulcast from 2GB)
- The Continuous Call Team | 1:00pm – 10:00pm (Saturdays), 1:00pm – 7:00pm (Sundays) (NRL Season Only)
- Weekend Afternoons with Trent Nikolic | 1:00pm – 7:00pm (Simulcast from 2GB) (Airs outside of NRL season)
- Saturday Country Music Countdown | 10:00pm – 12:00pm (Saturday Nights) (Simulcast from 2GB)
- Healthy Living with Dr. Ross Walker | 7:00pm – 8:00pm (Sunday Nights) (Simulcast Nationally)
- Sunday Nights with Bill Crews | 8:00pm – 12:00am (Simulcast from 2GB)

=== Former presenters ===
- Peter Fegan, September 2024 until October 2025
- Bill McDonald, September 2023 until September 2025
- Spencer Howson, January 2021 until December 2023.
- Ben Davis, January 2014 until June 2018.
- Jamie Dunn, January 2009 until October 2010.
- Ian Calder, January 2009 until October 2010.
