= The Country Hour =

Australian radio program

The Country Hour is Australia's longest running radio program, established in 1945. The program is currently broadcast on all regional ABC Local Radio stations from midday to 1pm each weekday, presenting news from rural and regional Australia, with a heavy focus on the agricultural industry.

== Programming ==
The program features live interviews and stories that are compiled by the ABC's rural reporters who are based at each regional station. National Rural News, a national five-minute rural news bulletin is broadcast on The Country Hour at 12:06pm. General national news headlines are broadcast at 12:30pm followed by a weather update. Market reports are delivered by designated correspondents just prior to the conclusion of the program at 1:00pm.

There are currently seven separate local editions of The Country Hour that are broadcast to each Australian state and territory, with the exception of the Australian Capital Territory. While the program is not aired on metropolitan ABC stations, but is streamed on their corresponding stations on the ABC Radio app.

Due to The Country Hour being aired at noon on regional ABC stations, the national current affairs program The World Today is aired on a one-hour delay in regional areas, whereas it is broadcast at midday on ABC stations in the capital cities.

== History ==
The concept of The Country Hour arose during World War II when research indicated educational content on radio had the potential to increase productivity for the war efforts, particularly in the agriculture sector. John Douglass, an agricultural scientist with some international radio experience, convinced ABC management to establish a specialist rural department. The ABC agreed and Douglass was subsequently appointed to lead the new department as "Federal Director of Rural Broadcasts". After recruiting some former ABC announcers to work on the program, it debuted on 3 December 1945 with presenter Dick Snedden welcoming listeners to "a program for the farm families of Australia". The program was officially opened by Federal Minister for Agriculture William Scully.

Stories that had been planned for the first few weeks of The Country Hour included coverage of stock sales at Homebush; an interview with a Pheasant enthusiast; an educational piece about a poultry factory; and an account of haymaking at Hawkesbury Agricultural College.

The format of The Country Hour was strategically planned to ensure the program rated as highly as possible. Airing from 12:15pm until 1:15pm, Douglass had programmed the show around a national news bulletin at 12:30pm and ensured the program was book-ended with a fifteen-minute episode of a radio serial, firstly The Lawsons then subsequently Blue Hills. Such radio serials were generally popular with women, but Douglass had some input into what script-writer Gwen Meredith included in her work, to make the serials more relevant to The Country Hour's audience. This resulted in the inclusion of relevant and accurate farming references much to the point of a documentary style in the first serial, The Lawsons, but the country people's lives themselves became the greater factor entwined with their social histories as Blue Hills commenced and the author perpetuated her style.

By the 1950s, the ABC had begun placing rural reporters at their regional stations so more locally-relevant stories could be presented to rural audiences, and enabling local state editions of The Country Hour. In 1951, the Victorian edition of The Country Hour broke the news of the decision to introduce the Myxoma virus into Australia in a bid to control the wild rabbit population, after Ian Clunies Ross told rural reporter Graham White about the plan.

=== 70th Anniversary ===
In 2015, The Country Hour celebrated its 70th anniversary, prompting tributes from well-known figures and a mention in the Parliament of Australia when Western Australian Senator Dean Smith reflected on the rural issues and events that had been covered by The Country Hour particularly in Western Australia.

A special national edition of The Country Hour was broadcast on 3 December 2015, the 70th anniversary of the program's debut.

ABC Rural's television program, Landline also focused on the history of The Country Hour during a special episode reflecting on 70 years of ABC Rural, which effectively commenced with the debut of The Country Hour in 1945.

=== 75th Anniversary ===
On 3 December 2020, The Country Hour celebrated its 75th anniversary with special broadcasts across the nation. The New South Wales edition of The Country Hour chose to honour the day by broadcasting from Cumnock in the state's central west, in recognition of the town being home to the 2CR antennae, the state's first and largest inland transmitter, and the first of its kind in the southern hemisphere. Cumnock had previously hosted the NSW edition of The Country Hour’s 60th anniversary in 2005.
