= Berserker Street State School =

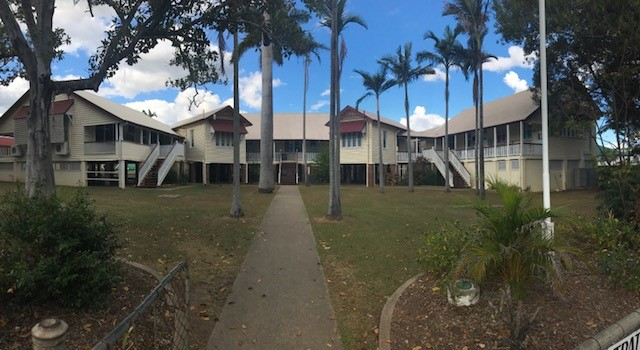
- Berserker Street State School original 1917 building (centre) at the centenary, 2017

- Location within Queensland
- 23.3661°S 150.5300°E
- Location: 128–140 Berserker Street, Berserker, Rockhampton Region, Queensland, Australia

History
- Design period: 1870s–1890s (Late 19th century)
- Built: 1880–1926, 1916–1917, 1917–1926, 1917–1970, 1918

Site notes
- Architect(s): Department of Public Works (Queensland); Robert and John Ferguson

Queensland Heritage Register
- Official name: Berserker Street State School
- Type: state heritage
- Designated: 20 September 2019
- Reference no.: 650233
- Type: Education, Research, Scientific Facility: School – state (primary)
- Theme: Educating Queenslanders: Providing primary schooling

Berserker Street State School is a heritage-listed state school at 128–140 Berserker Street, Berserker, Rockhampton Region, Queensland, Australia. It was designed by Department of Public Works (Queensland), Robert and John Ferguson and built from 1880 to 1926. It was added to the Queensland Heritage Register on 20 September 2019.

== History ==
Berserker Street State School, established in 1917, is situated approximately 2.5 km northeast of the Rockhampton CBD on a 4.27ha site. It is important in demonstrating the evolution of state education and its associated architecture. The school retains a good example of a suburban timber school building (Block A, central and north wings, 1917–1918) with a Ferguson timber school building addition (south wing, 1888, relocated 1926) and is set in landscaped grounds with mature trees. The school has been in continuous operation since its establishment and has been a focus for the local community as a place for important social and cultural activities.

The Rockhampton area is the traditional land of the Dharumbal people. The Archer brothers, who made a private expedition to the Rockhampton district in 1853, were the first Europeans to record and chart the Fitzroy River. The Archers were also the first European pastoralists to arrive in the area. Their establishment of Gracemere Station led to further pastoral expansion into the area. The Archers, who had spent several years in Norway, named the mountain range to the northeast of Rockhampton, the Berserker Range, after Norse saga hero, Baresark.

After the short-lived Canoona gold rush of 1858, Rockhampton was proclaimed as a town and declared a "port of entry" in 1858. Following the gold rush, the town of Rockhampton developed as an entry and export town for Central Queensland. Rockhampton emerged as an important Queensland regional centre during the 1850s and 1860s. The Municipality of Rockhampton was proclaimed on 15 December 1860. Rockhampton's development took on a greater prominence after the discovery of the mining wealth at Mount Morgan in 1882. The Borough of North Rockhampton, with a population of less than 1700, was established in 1883.

North Rockhampton developed as a predominately working class area in comparison with the wealthier south side of the Fitzroy River. In 1881, a bridge was constructed linking the north and the south, which encouraged urban development on the northern side. In 1899, the Alexandra Railway Bridge was opened, linking north and south Rockhampton by rail over the Fitzroy River. At the time, a major North Rockhampton industry was the Lakes Creek Meatworks, located several kilometres downstream, providing a great deal of employment for residents on the north bank. The new railway bridge provided a means of efficient transport of cattle to the works. By the turn of the century, its population had steadily increased, and by 1911 had reached almost 3000 people.

By the early 20th century, several schools had been established in North Rockhampton, including Rockhampton North State School (1871), Lakes Creek State School (1872), Frenchville State School (1900) and Park Avenue State School (1901). As the population of the district increased, efforts were made by the Department of Public Instruction to expand existing schools. The problems of overcrowding, however, persisted, and some children had to walk several miles to the closest school.

A committee was formed to lobby the government for a new school in central North Rockhampton, and in 1916 the Minister for Public Instruction, Herbert Hardacre, inspected a potential 5 acre (2ha) school site with the local minister, John Adamson. This government-owned land was situated on a sloping site over-run with prickly pear, scrub and feral goats. At the time, the vacant land was for sale. On inspection, however, the Minister concurred that the site was suitable for a school, was withdrawn from sale, and gazetted as a school reserve.

Tenders for the construction of the school were called in April 1916 with John Hutchinson awarded the £1961 contract. The school had almost been completed by November 1916 when the Morning Bulletin stated that "the building is indeed all that a modern school should be and the residents of North Rockhampton are to be congratulated upon having been given such a fine structure". The new timber school building, which could accommodate 148 students, contained three classrooms and two angled teachers rooms connected by a 10 ft (3m) wide verandah, and was supported by brick pillars with a concreted play area underneath. Glazed folding partitions divided the classrooms and hat rooms were located at the ends of the verandah. In 2019, this building forms the central wing of Block A.

Under the stewardship of the Department of Public Works (DPW) and its staff of some of Queensland's most innovative architects, school buildings became more advanced through an evolution of standard designs. In the early 20th century, with a growing concern about child health in education, the DPW evolved its school building designs with recommendations from medical professionals on light and ventilation. Notably, high-set buildings were introduced c. 1909, providing better ventilation as well as informal teaching space and a covered play area in the understorey. This form became characteristic of Queensland schools. A new technical innovation was a continuous, hinged ventilation flap on the wall at floor level to increase air flow into the classroom and, combined with a ceiling vent and large roof fleche, improved internal air quality and decreased temperatures. Windows were considerably enlarged and sills were lowered to provide a greater amount of natural light into the room. These windows were provided to one wall of the classroom only, to the left hand side of the student, and any other windows remained small and very highset. Smaller classrooms in serial arrangement were preferred as they were easier to light well and correctly. The lighter and airier interiors met with immediate approval from educationalists.

The type chosen for Berserker Street State School was the new suburban timber school building type, which was the culmination of the early 20th century experimentation with light, ventilation, and classroom size, and was regarded as providing the ideal, modern education environment. It was the grandest of the standard timber designs of the time, and included all of the lighting and ventilation techniques developed. It was constructed for large, model, or high profile schools in growing suburban areas, and was not extensively deployed, lasting until around 1920. Other examples include Silkstone State School (1915), Cannon Hill State School (1915) and Enoggera State School (1916).

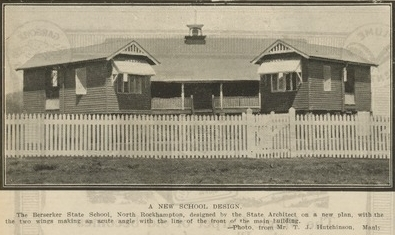
Berserker State School, 1917

The school was completed by the beginning of 1917 and Patrick James Griffin was appointed head teacher. In late January, the newly formed school committee sent an invitation to the Minister of Public Instruction, HF Hardacre, to officiate at the opening ceremony. Disappointingly for the school community, the Minister could not attend, but made assurances that he would be present at an official opening ceremony in the near future. An "unofficial" ceremony was held regardless in late January, attended by local dignitaries including minister John Adamson. Classes began in February, and the school's initial enrolment of 195 students had increased to 316 by the end of the year. In September the school's original name of Berserker State School was changed to Berserker Street, to avoid confusion with the Berserker railway station, located approximately 3 km to the southeast.

From its opening in 1917, the planting of trees in the school grounds was an important activity for the school community and students participated in Arbor Day celebrations, an annual event in Queensland since 1890. Aesthetically-designed gardens were encouraged by regional inspectors, and educators believed gardening and Arbor Days instilled in young minds the value of hard work and activity, improved classroom discipline, developed aesthetic tastes, and inspired people to stay on the land. Two types of fig trees had been planted by the school committee in 1917 and the following year the progress of these trees was noted, 'an inspection of the shade trees planted on Arbor Day showed that the Moreton Bay figs had made splendid progress, but that the majority of weeping figs had died.' A very large, early fig tree remains in front of Block A in 2019, and other mature trees along the western boundary, including figs and a schotia (Schotia brachypetala) are the earliest trees surviving on the site and illustrate the school's tradition of planting trees around the perimeter of the grounds.

From the outset, the school had problems with overcrowding as enrolment numbers continuously increased. In April 1918, the school committee wrote to the Minister of Public Instruction requesting extra classrooms. This was approved by the Minister, and a £1390 addition, which now forms the north wing of Block A, was constructed soon after. It comprised two classrooms, divided by a folding partition, built on concrete pillars above a concreted play area. The DPW annual report from 1918 stated that the design for the school would be complete once another wing had been constructed to the south.

As predicted, enrolments at the school continued to rise and further classrooms were required. In 1926, the planned U-shaped arrangement of wings was completed when a timber building from Rockhampton North Boys State School was relocated to the site. In 1888, the Rockhampton North State School had been split into separate "boys" and "girls and infants" schools, and a new boys school building, constructed by Wakefield, McLean and Co, was completed by July 1888. This building was built to a standard design by architect Robert Ferguson that had been introduced in 1880 and constructed across Queensland until 1893. Employed by the Department of Public Instruction, Ferguson was responsible for school building design between 1879 and 1885 and he was the first to give serious consideration to the ventilation of interiors. Ferguson introduced a coved ceiling with exposed roof trusses and vented the roof space, improving internal temperatures. The number of windows and their size was increased, with sill heights typically over 4 ft, 6in (1.3m) above floor level, well above eye level of students. Examples of other surviving Ferguson schools include Roadvale State School (1889), Maryborough Central State School (1882), and Bundaberg Central State School (1890).

The Rockhampton North Boys State School building was low-set with a gable roof, modest Carpenter Gothic timber detailing, and a T-shaped plan containing two large 20 ft by 50 ft (approx. 6m by 15m) classrooms, with verandahs along the long sides. Queen post trusses were exposed within the classrooms, and the exterior featured decorative timber brackets; tall, narrow window sashes protected by hoods; and two prominent ventilation fleches. In 1926, the building was split into two, with the southwest classroom relocated to Berserker Street State School and the northeast classroom to Park Avenue State School. In 2019, the Ferguson teaching building forms the south wing of Block A.

Once relocated to Berserker, the Ferguson building was modified to suit its new location. Stairs and a hat room were removed from the north verandah and a new stair constructed to match the north wing. A connecting walkway was built to link the verandah with the southern hat room of the central wing. On the south side, a section of enclosed verandah was removed and a doorway filled in.

Block A surrounded a landscaped courtyard which was used as the original front entrance to the school. It includes a straight path from Berserker Street to the centre of the central wing, which has existed since the school opened in 1917. The courtyard has been beautified by different planting schemes and garden beds over time, and has been used for student assembly and as the backdrop for school photographs.

In the early 1930s, enrolment numbers continued to increase and two additions were constructed - a northeast wing containing two classrooms by early 1933 (now the western end of Block C); and a southeast wing containing three classrooms in 1937 (now the western end of Block B). Both additions were standard sectional school building types. They were linked to Block A by raised covered walkways constructed along the north and south walls of the central wing. Windows in these walls were relocated to the east wall of the central wing, and classroom seating was rearranged so that daylight remained on the pupils' left hand side. Other alterations to the central wing in 1937 included the insertion of a double-hung window with fanlight into the verandah wall of each classroom to improve light and ventilation, and the relocation of the southern classroom's door. The 1930s additions both underwent substantial alterations in later decades.

During World War II, schools were typically a focus for civilian duty. With the entry of Japan into the war and the increased threat of enemy attack, the Queensland Government closed all coastal state schools between January and March 1942, and student attendance was optional until the war ended. At Berserker Street State School slit trenches for protecting the students from Japanese air raids were dug in the school grounds, and in 1942 students established and tended vegetable plots to contribute to the war effort. The Air Raid Precaution organisation also set up a casualty clearing station at the school in case of attack.

Improvements to the school grounds in the 1930s and 40s included: the construction of two tennis courts (1936 and 1948, no longer extant); the acquisition of approximately 9ha of additional land to the northeast, with subsequent works to the grounds to create a playing field and cricket pitch; and concreting of the straight path from Berserker Street to the front steps of the school, completed by March 1945. Funds for school improvements, equipment and sporting amenities were largely raised by the efforts of the school committee, Parents and Citizens Association and ladies social committee, who held fund raising events such as fetes and balls and made appeals to the Rockhampton community and businesses.

Block A's understorey was partly enclosed by the construction of toilets beneath the north wing (girls and female teachers) and south wing (boys and male teachers) in 1947. These toilets were demolished after the construction of a new toilet block at the east end of the parade ground in the mid-1980s, with only the external concrete walls and a timber batten screen remaining in 2019.

The school underwent growth in the 1950s, requiring additions to accommodate increasing student numbers. The Department of Public Instruction was largely unprepared for the enormous demand for state education from the late 1940s and well into the 1960s. This was a nation-wide occurrence resulting from immigration and the unprecedented population growth now termed the "baby boom". At Queensland's overcrowded schools many new buildings were constructed and existing buildings were extended. In addition to the construction of new buildings, such as a separate infants wing (1951, extended 1956) and a teachers residence (1951), Blocks B and C were both extended to the west by five classrooms between 1953 and 1958. These additions resulted in long wings on either side of a bitumen-surfaced parade ground to form an H-shaped complex. The parade ground became the principal place of assembly at the heart of the school, and in 2019 it remains open playground space.

From the 1950s alterations were also made to Block A. In 1954, the eastern windows of the south wing were removed and a new bank of timber awning windows inserted in the south wall. In 1957, some windows in the central wing's verandah wall were replaced with timber double-hung windows. By 1963, part of the north wing's balustrades had been replaced by bag racks. Alterations to the north wing in 1963 included a new dividing partition between classrooms and the insertion of banks of louvres within enlarged areas of windows in the verandah walls. In 1977, windows in the east wall of the central wing were replaced by fixed glass and louvres, and the north classroom was turned into a remedial resources room by the addition of a store room, wet area, and a new solid classroom partition. More recently, modern folding walls have been installed between the central and south classrooms of the central wing, and in the south wing to create two classrooms.

The school grounds were expanded again in the 1970s with the acquisition of approximately 12ha to the east and the subsequent closure of the through road, Bawden Street, in 1974. By the mid-1980s this land had been filled and graded to create a second playing field. Later development has occurred around the H-shaped complex of Blocks A, B and C, but no further extensions to these blocks have been made since 1958. Blocks B and C have been altered by the enclosure of their verandahs and rearrangement of internal partitions, and a multi-purpose hall (2010) and kindergarten (2011) have been constructed on the earlier (late-1940s) playing field.

Berserker Street State School, established in 1917, has played an important role in the north Rockhampton district community, and continues to do so. In 1992, the school community celebrated its 75th anniversary with the publication of the school's history, and in 2017 the school's centenary was celebrated with a public open day, an official ceremony during which a time capsule was opened, and a ball. Generations of students have been taught at Berserker Street State School and many social events held in the school's grounds and buildings since its establishment. The school continues to be a centre for social, sporting and community events.

== Alumni ==
Florence Amy Willie who was a leader in the local South Sea Islander community was educated here in the 1930s.

== Description ==
Berserker Street State School is located in the north Rockhampton suburb of Berserker, approximately 3 km northeast of the city centre. The school is within a residential area and its 4.27 ha block is bounded by Bedford, Berserker, Charles and Bawden streets, and by residential properties and Mcleod Park at the eastern end. The school addresses Berserker Street to the west, with the school buildings concentrated at the western end of the grounds.

The original main entrance to the school is located in the centre of the Berserker Street boundary, centred on the earliest school building, Block A (a suburban timber school building built 1917–18 with Ferguson addition built in 1888, relocated 1926). The grounds are beautified by mature trees along the Berserker Street boundary, and a courtyard in front of Block A, which enhances views of the building from Berserker Street.

=== Block A ===
Block A is laid out in U-shaped arrangement of three rectangular wings around a courtyard, addressing Berserker Street to the west. Verandahs link the wings around the courtyard, and two teachers rooms project diagonally from the corners at the intersections of the wings. The three wings were constructed at different dates and have differences in their form, fabric and details:

=== Grounds and views ===
The school has a tradition of boundary tree plantings and the grounds contain several mature trees along the Berserker Street boundary, including one very large, mature fig (Ficus sp.).

On the west (front) side of Block A is a landscaped courtyard area that allows attractive views to and from Block A's wings, and of Block A from Berserker Street, framed by trees.

The parade ground is a generous student assembly, circulation and play space that enhances the setting of Block A. Block A's open understorey permits views between the parade ground and the front courtyard, visually linking the Berserker Street entrance with the heart of the school grounds.

== Heritage listing ==
Berserker Street State School was listed on the Queensland Heritage Register on 20 September 2019 having satisfied the following criteria.

The place is important in demonstrating the evolution or pattern of Queensland's history.

Berserker Street State School (established 1917) is important in demonstrating the evolution of state education and its associated architecture in Queensland. The place retains good representative examples of standard government designs that were a response to prevailing government educational philosophies. The Suburban Timber School Building (Block A, central and north wings, built 1917–18), demonstrates the evolution of timber school design, including experimentation with light and ventilation, by the Department of Public Works.

The school's large, suburban landscaped site, including assembly areas, play space and mature trees, demonstrates educational philosophies that promoted the importance of play and aesthetics in the education of children.

The place is important in demonstrating the principal characteristics of a particular class of cultural places.

Berserker Street State School is important in demonstrating the principal characteristics of a suburban Queensland state school of the early 20th century. These include: teaching buildings constructed to standard designs by the Department of Public Works that incorporate classrooms with high levels of natural light and ventilation, set in landscaped grounds with mature trees and assembly and play areas.

Block A's central (1917) and north (1918) wings form a good, intact example of a Suburban Timber School Building and demonstrate the principal characteristics of this type. These include its: highset timber-framed and -clad construction; open understorey accommodating play areas; facebrick piers (central wing); symmetrical design with classroom wings linked by verandahs; projecting teachers rooms; verandah hat rooms; and a strong consideration for natural light and ventilation, including elevated classrooms with open understorey, high level windows and fanlights, lofty and coved ventilated ceilings, and hinged wall ventilation flaps at floor level (central wing).

The south wing (1888, relocated 1926) is a good example of a Ferguson teaching building with later alterations to complete Block A, and demonstrates the principal characteristics of the Ferguson type through its form, classroom size, materials, early windows, and surviving Carpenter Gothic ornamentation.

The place is important because of its aesthetic significance.

Block A is highly intact and has aesthetic significance for its beautiful attributes, through its symmetrical layout, elegant composition, decorative treatment, and high quality materials and craftsmanship.

The school is an attractive feature of the area and is significant for its streetscape contribution. Set back from the street and surrounding a courtyard, Block A's setting is enhanced by mature trees along the Berserker Street boundary, which frame views of the school from Berserker Street.

The place has a strong or special association with a particular community or cultural group for social, cultural or spiritual reasons.

Berserker Street State School has a strong and ongoing association with past and present pupils, parents, staff members, and the surrounding community through sustained use since its establishment in 1917. With over 100 years of association with the Rockhampton community, the establishment of the school reflected the rapid growth of the north Rockhampton area in the early 20th century, which resulted in a strong community demand for state-run education. The place is important for its contribution to the educational development of Rockhampton, with generations of children taught at the school, and has served as a prominent venue for social interaction and community focus. The strength of association is demonstrated through repeated local volunteer action, donations, and an active Parents and Citizens Association and other school committees.
