= Enoggera State School =

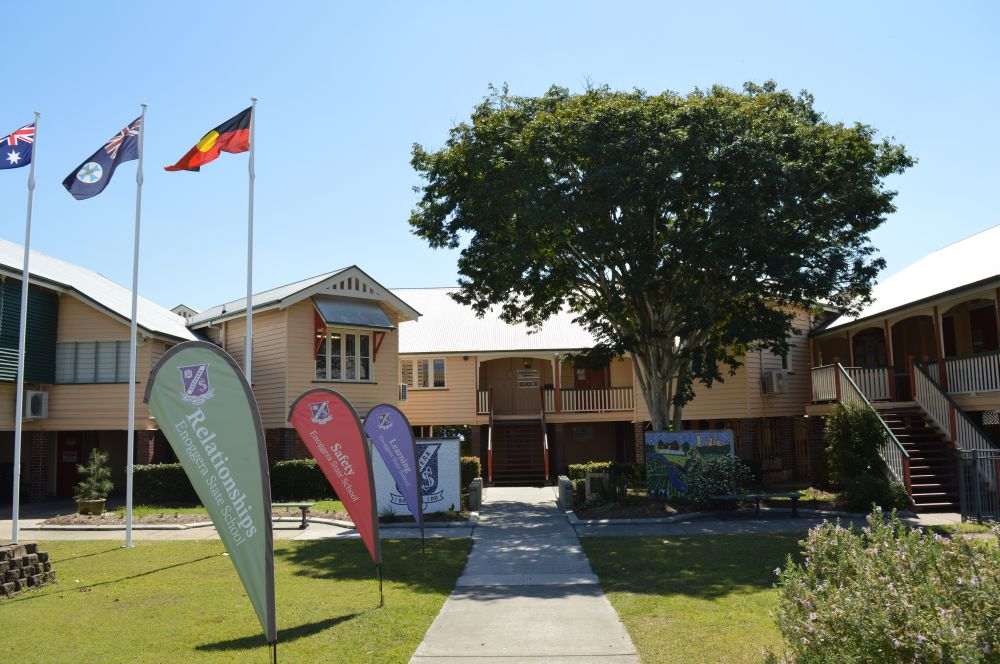
- Block A (centre), 2018

- Location within Queensland
- 27.4170°S 152.9942°E
- Location: 235 South Pine Road, Enoggera, City of Brisbane, Queensland, Australia

History
- Design period: 1914–1919 (World War I)
- Built: 1916, Block A, Suburban Timber School Building (C/T8), 1916, Block B, Suburban Timber School Building (C/T8), 1931, Block D, later version of Suburban Timber School Building (C/T8), 1939, Block C, later version of Suburban Timber School Building (C/T8), 1950, Block E, later version of Suburban Timber School Building (C/T8)

Site notes
- Architect: Alfred Barton Brady

Queensland Heritage Register
- Official name: Enoggera State School
- Type: state heritage
- Designated: 1 February 2019
- Reference no.: 650085
- Type: Education, Research, Scientific Facility: School – state (primary); Education, research, scientific facility: School-state
- Theme: Educating Queenslanders: Providing primary schooling

Enoggera State School is a heritage-listed government primary school at 235 South Pine Road, Enoggera, City of Brisbane, Queensland, Australia. It was designed by Alfred Barton Brady and its heritage buildings were built from 1916 to 1950. It was added to the Queensland Heritage Register on 1 February 2019.

== History ==
Enoggera State School was established on this site between Laurel Street and South Pine Road in 1871. It has a number of timber school buildings dating from 1916, including:

- suburban timber school buildings, Blocks A and B (built 1916) and Block D (built 1931)
- sectional school buildings; Block C (built 1939) and Block E (planned 1940, built 1950).

The school has a strong and ongoing association with the Enoggera community.

The provision of state-administered education was important to the colonial governments of Australia. \National schools, established in 1848 in New South Wales, were continued in Queensland following the colony's creation in 1859. Following the introduction of the Education Act 1860, which established the Board of General Education and began standardising curriculum, training and facilities, Queensland's national and public schools grew from four in 1860 to 230 by 1875. The State Education Act 1875 provided for free, compulsory and secular primary education and established the Department of Public Instruction. This further standardised the provision of education, and despite difficulties, achieved the remarkable feat of bringing basic literacy to most Queensland children by 1900.

The establishment of schools was considered an essential step in the development of communities and integral to their success. Locals often donated land and labour for a school's construction and the school community contributed to maintenance and development. Schools became a community focus, a symbol of progress, and a source of pride, with enduring connections formed with past pupils, parents, and teachers. The inclusion of war memorials and community halls reinforced these connections and provided a venue for a wide range of community events in schools across Queensland.

To help ensure consistency and economy, the Queensland Government developed standard plans for its school buildings. From the 1860s until the 1960s, Queensland school buildings were predominantly timber-framed, an easy and cost-effective approach that also enabled the government to provide facilities in remote areas. Standard designs were continually refined in response to changing needs and educational philosophy and Queensland school buildings were particularly innovative in climate control, lighting, and ventilation. Standardisation produced distinctly similar schools across Queensland with complexes of typical components.

A meeting to establish a school in the Enoggera District was held in the Enoggera Hotel on 5 September 1870, and a school committee was formed. While in the early years of school establishment following the Education Act of 1860, local committees were required to raise one third of the cost of the school, but this requirement was relaxed in 1864. The Enoggera School Committee raised £60 by April 1871, although a further £10 was required for construction to commence. The committee resolved to raise this money immediately. The Education Office called for tenders in May 1871 for a school house and teacher's residence; the final cost amounting to £287.

The school was on the traditional lands of the Turrbul people and origins of the name "Enoggera" have been variously reported as a corruption of Euogra meaning, "song and dance" (place of corroboree), "place of waters" or "place of breezes". Early European settlers of the 1860s planted orchards and vineyards. A transport route evolved following the discovery of gold in Gympie in 1867, when prospectors and their bullock teams travelled through Enoggera and on to what is now Old Northern Road (previously Great Northern Road) to Gympie. The opening of cattle sale yards at Newmarket in 1877 also added impetus to growth and development of the region.

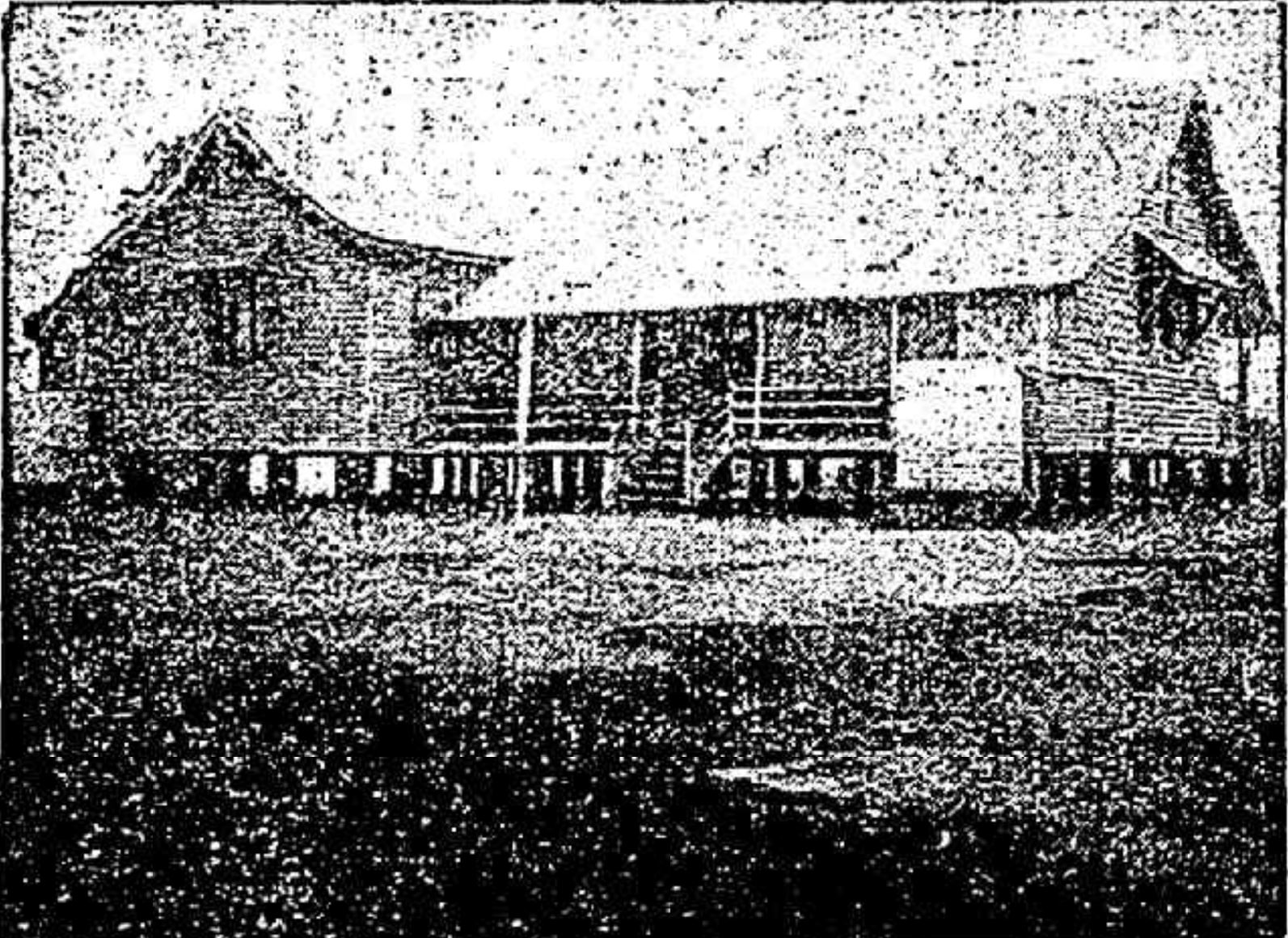
1871 school building

The Enoggera State School was opened 24 August 1871, with a ceremony attended by more than 70 people. The school committee acknowledged the contribution of Timothy Corbett and James Mooney who contributed financially to the school buildings, as well as each donating an acre of land: Sub A, Portion 5 (Corbett) and Sub 1 Portion 6 (Mooney). Mooney died before his donation was registered and his land transfer did not occur until 1882. The school building was a timber structure, 40 by 20 feet (12.2 by 6.1 m), with a verandah and the timber school residence to the west of the school. All structures were built within Sub A Portion 5, because the school did not have ownership of the adjoining parcel (Sub 1 Portion 6). The contractor was Edward Lewis of the Pimlico Shops; a timber workshop in Albert Street. Tenders were called for a playshed for the school in August 1877.

The school hosted a public meeting in January 1885, advocating the extension of the railway line through this important farming area, enabling farmers to get their crops to the Roma Street Markets. This line, originally intended to reach Samford, was built as far as Enoggera in February 1899. Meanwhile, an additional room was added to the timber school in late-1885. Arbor Day was held regularly at the school in the 1890s and early 20th century, although no mention was made of the species of trees, nor the location of the plantings in the press reports. Ongoing repairs, additions and alterations to the school buildings occurred during these years.

The Department of Public Instruction acquired another four suburban allotments to the east of the school reserve of approximately 1,821 square metres (0.450 acres) in January 1913. In December 1914, the under Secretary for Education, John Douglas Story, promised that Enoggera would soon be in possession of a new brick school building. The war intervened, and in September 1915, the Minister for Education announced that a modern timber school would be built instead. A brick school was estimated to cost £5000 and a timber one could be built for around £2852.

The new school building was a showcase of the revised design elements of Department of Public Works (DPW) designs. From 1893 DPW greatly improved the natural ventilation and lighting of classroom interiors, experimenting with different combinations of roof ventilators, ceiling and wall vents, larger windows, dormer windows and ducting. Achieving an ideal or even adequate level of natural light in classrooms, without glare, was of critical importance to educators and consequently it became central to the design and layout of all school buildings.

In c. 1909 high-set timber buildings were introduced, providing better ventilation as well as further teaching space and a covered play area underneath. This was a noticeable new direction and this form became a characteristic of Queensland schools. A technical innovation developed at this time was a continuous ventilation flap on the wall at floor level. This hinged board could be opened to increase air flow into the space and, combined with a ceiling vent and large roof fleche, improved internal air quality and decreased internal temperatures effectively. This type was introduced around 1909 and was constructed until approximately 1920.

From around 1909 windows were rearranged and enlarged to provide a greater amount of gentle, southern light into the room and desks were rearranged so that the light would fall onto students' left hand sides to avoid throwing shadows onto the pages; this presupposed that all students were right-handed. This often meant a complete transformation of the fenestration of existing buildings. Windows were larger and sills were lowered to let in more light generally. Smaller classrooms were preferred as they were easier to light correctly. Interiors became lighter and airier and met with immediate approval from educationalists.

The years of experimentation culminated in the 1914 introduction of the suburban school type (C/T8) that solved many of the problems of light, ventilation, and classroom size that plagued previous school designs, as well as providing the ideal, modern education environment.

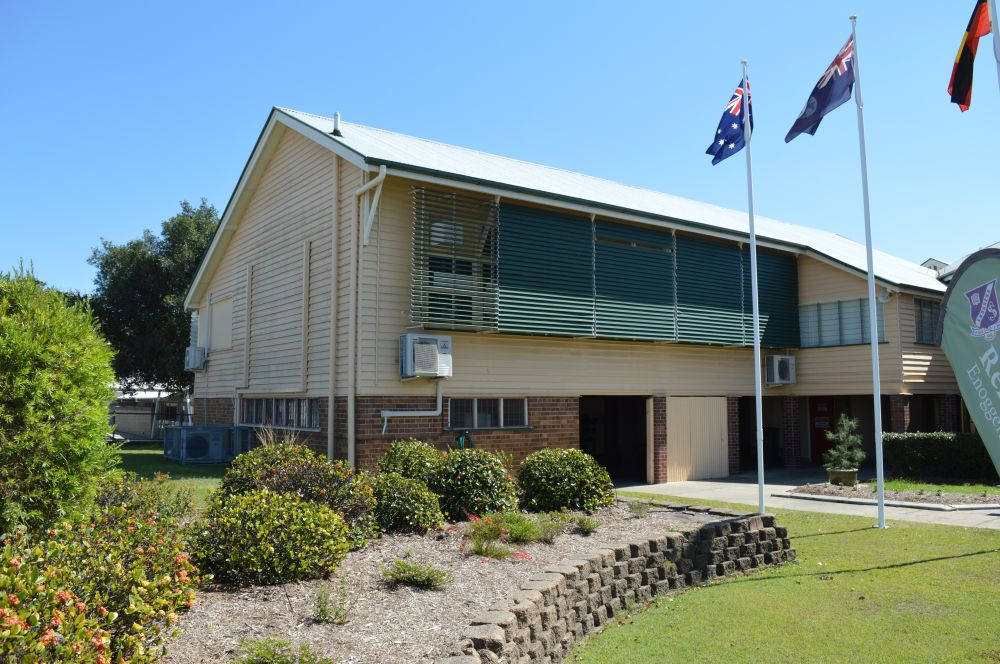
Block B from south-east, 2018

The new Enoggera State School (type C/T8) was opened on 7 October 1916, by the Secretary for Public Instruction, Herbert Hardacre. Concurrently, a roll of honour was unveiled, honouring more than 50 committee men, teachers and scholars who volunteered to serve in World War I. Hardacre described the school as the same type as Cannon Hill State School which had opened the previous year. The Enoggera School faced south onto South Pine Road, whereas the Cannon Hill School faced north. The timber building on brick piers, had asbestos slates on the roof, and pressed metal coved ceilings. The two main classroom wings (Block A on an east–west axis and Block B to its west) were placed at right angles to each other, with smaller wings housing hat and cloakroom and teachers rooms, placed diagonally at each veranda end, creating a part courtyard effect. The plans for the school indicate that Block A was divided into three classrooms with "accordion partitions" and Block B into two classrooms. The north wall of Block A, which had no verandah, contained high windows at each end and a large bank of windows in the middle providing left-hand light to pupils in the middle classrooms. The large windows on the gable ends provided left hand light to the other classrooms, the classrooms were 22 feet (6.7 m) wide and each allowed for 40 pupils. Each block had a prominent central ventilation fleche linked by ducts to ceiling vents. The school at that time had an enrolment of 230 and the new buildings could accommodate 250. The site was planned so another wing could be added in the future. Other schools built to this typology include Silkstone State School, Townsville's Railway Estate State School, Berserker Street State School and Buranda Girls and Infants School. In 1917, the original 1871 school building was gifted to the community for use as a School of Arts.

The school committee inaugurated an annual fund raising event in 1923 to provide for the construction of tennis courts and tree planting. Tennis and basketball courts were built on the north western corner of the site. By July 1925, the school needed to expand further. The school committee approached the minister for Public Instruction, Thomas Wilson, MLA, seeking a new teacher's residence and the removal of the existing one from the centre of the playground. The School of Arts (1871 school) remained on the school grounds until late 1925 when it was relocated to its present position at 349 Wardell Street (27.4219°S 152.9911°E); by that time jointly owned by the RSSILA and re-erected as a Memorial Hall. Tenders were called for the removal of the old school residence in November 1925. The school committee held its third annual fund raising event in a recently completed gymnasium on the site in February 1926. The tennis and basketball courts were reportedly recently upgraded. Additions were designed by the former Queensland Government Architect Lt Col Thomas Pye.

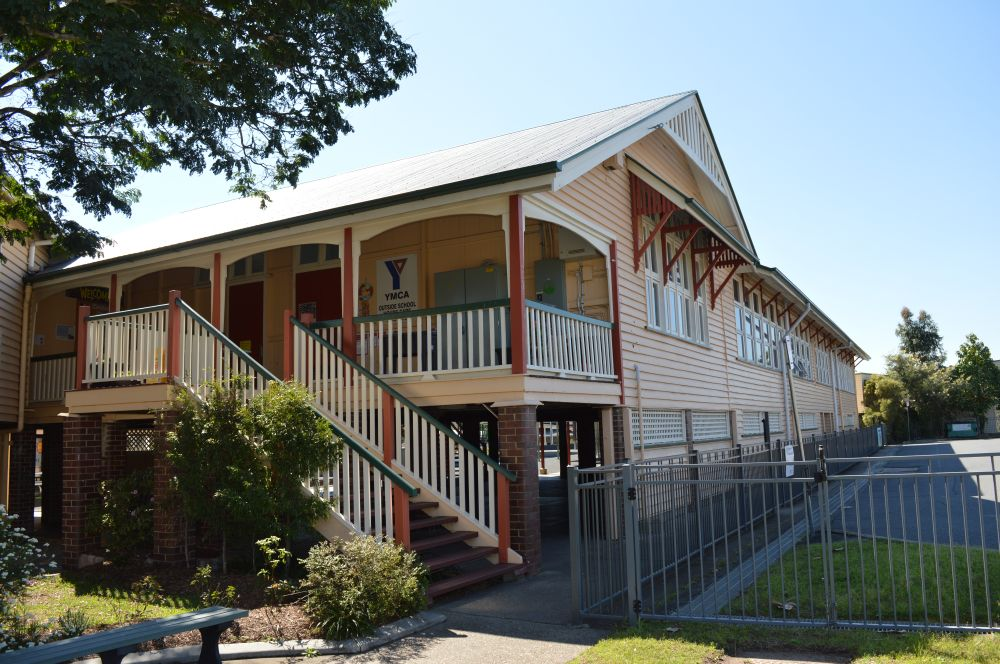
Block D from the south-west, 2018

By 1925 the school which was designed for 320 students, had enrolments of 450 and classes had to be held on verandahs and in the hat enclosures. A new wing was required, but not immediately provided. Tenders were called in August 1930 for the new wing, and outbuildings; J Wight of Milton the successful tenderer at a price of £98/10/-. While the new structure matched the existing wing, fulfilling the site layout design developed in 1915, it did not include the pressed metal ceilings featured in the earlier buildings due to financial restraints. Andrew Irving's plans were approved by Queensland Government Architect Alfred Barton Brady on 9 December 1915. The building (Block D) opened in March 1931. The final cost was £1105, but two classes still had to be accommodated on verandahs. Accommodation pressures were eased with the opening of the Everton Park State School (then known as Bunyaville State School) in 1934.

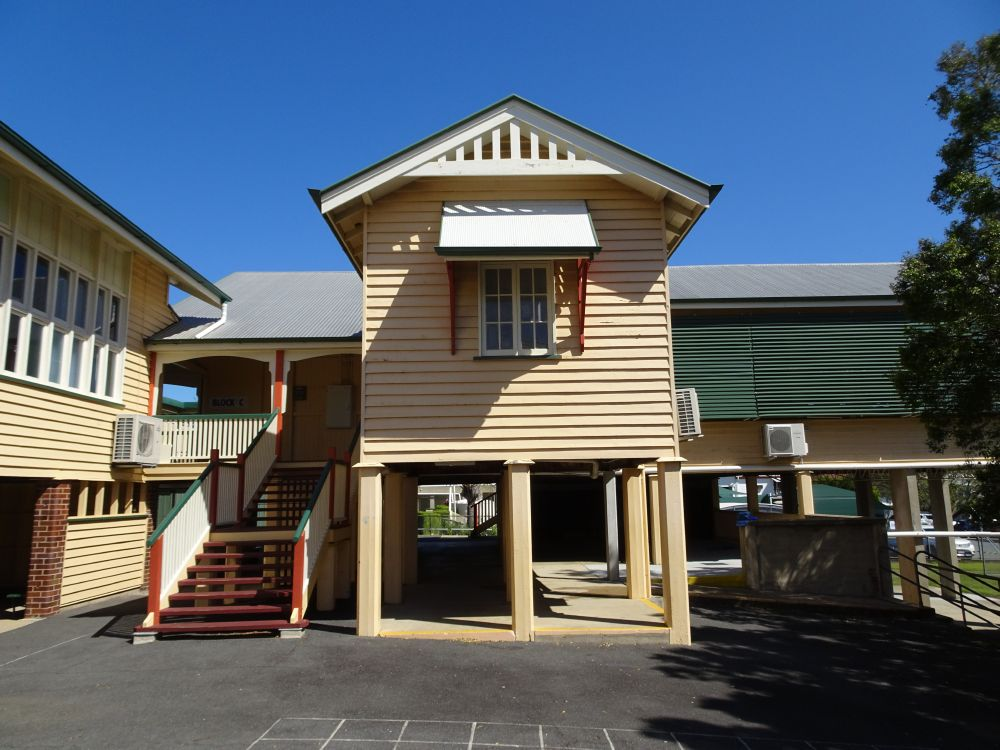
Block C from the east, 2018

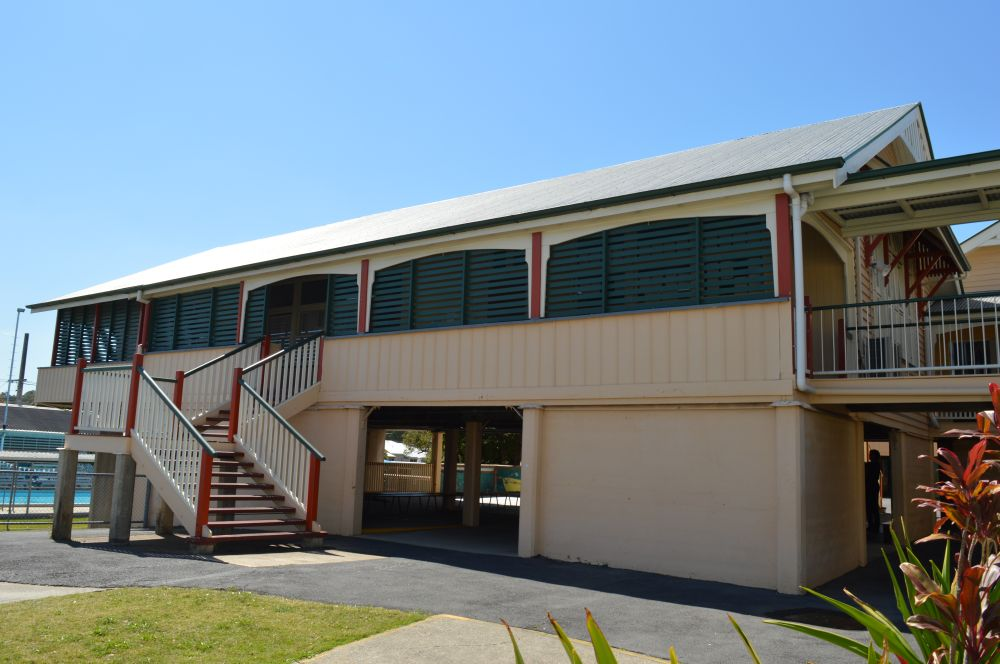
Block C from the south-west, 2018

Enoggera State School celebrated its diamond jubilee (one year late) in November 1932, attended by parents and past students. The school grounds were extended by 1,821 square metres (0.450 acres) to the east in April 1935. A fete was held in October 1936 to raise funds for continued improvements to the school grounds. The committee had already provided a tennis and basketball court, and a concrete cricket wicket. By mid-1937, the committee was advocating the construction of another wing for the school. The local MLA Mr G Taylor advised that finance had been approved for this addition in November 1937. It was not completed until 31 July 1939 at a cost of £1810. The new wing (Block C) provided two more classrooms, a teacher's room with hat room and was roofed in red fibre cement slates. It was built on concrete piers and was cemented underneath. This wing was built to the northwest of the 1916 buildings, linked to existing verandas and parallel to the western boundary of the school reserve.

Following the Japanese bombing of Pearl Harbor in December 1941 and the escalation of World War II into the Pacific region, the Queensland Government closed all coastal state schools in January 1942 fearing a Japanese invasion. Although most schools reopened on 2 March 1942, student attendance was optional until the war ended. Slit trenches, for protecting the students from Japanese air raids, were also dug at Queensland state schools, often by parents and staff. Only two teachers and four parents turned up to help did the trenches at Enoggera in January 1942.

The Department of Public Instruction was largely unprepared for the enormous demand for state education between the late 1940s and the 1960s. This was a nation-wide occurrence resulting from immigration and the unprecedented population growth now termed the "baby boom". Brisbane had grown from a population of 326,000 in 1939 to 425,000 in 1951, and new housing estates were developed around Enoggera and elsewhere. Queensland schools were overcrowded and, to cope, many new buildings were constructed and existing buildings were extended. In 1948 the Department of Education built four temporary classrooms and two army huts were sourced to provide four more classrooms to accommodate 240 extra students.

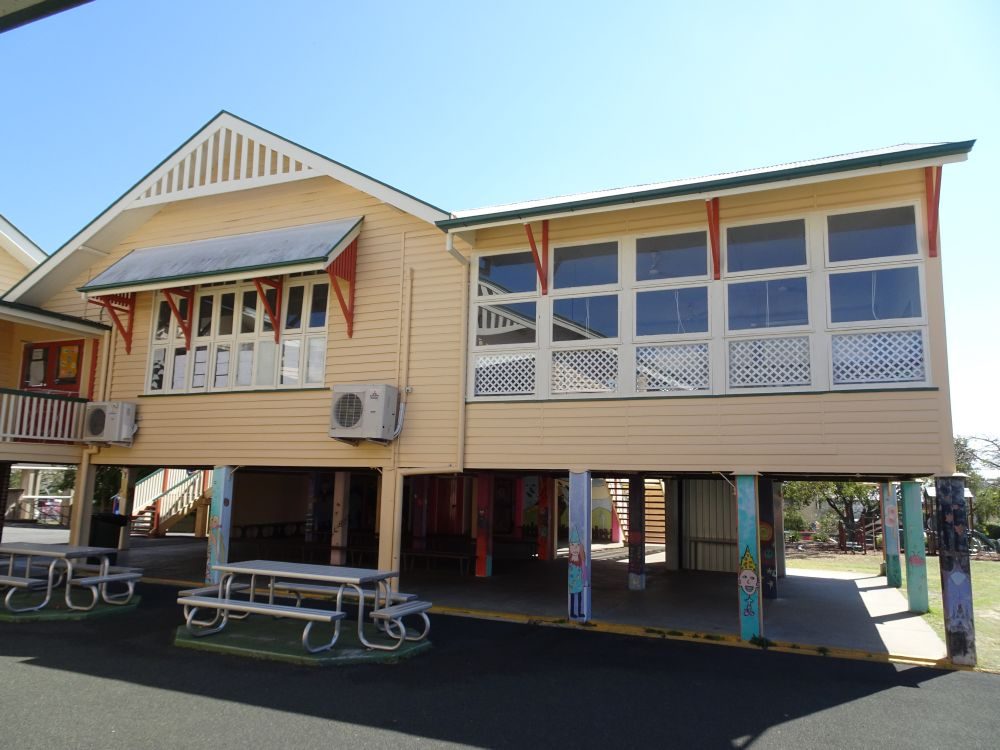
Block E from the south (Boulton and Paul extension to the right), 2018

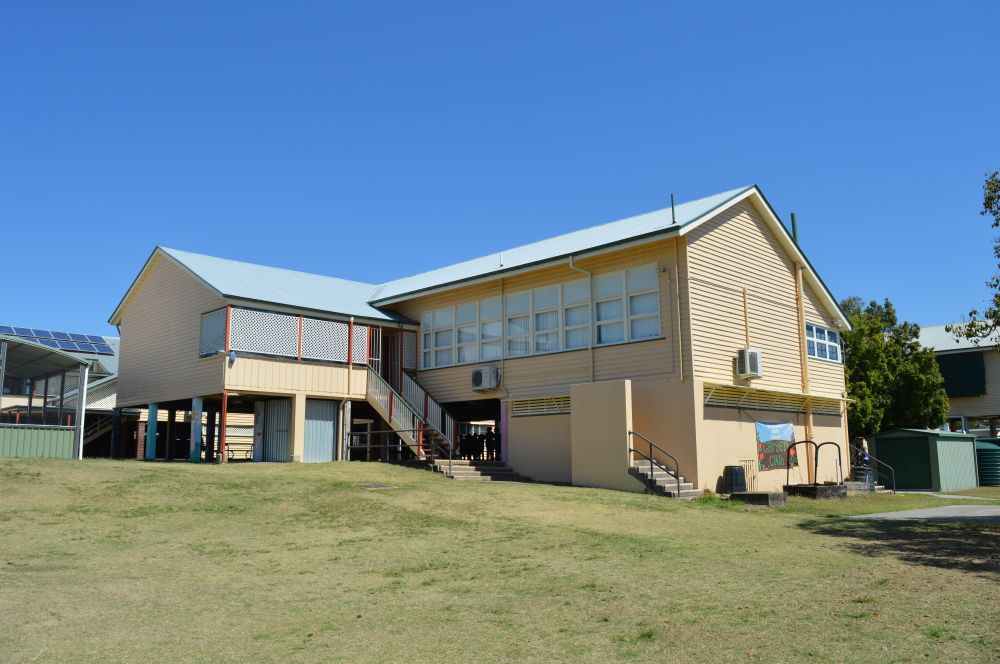
Block E from the north-east, 2018

Approval for the expenditure of £3890 for Enoggera State School was given late in 1949. Enrolments by that time were 685 students. The original 1941 plan was fulfilled with the construction during 1950, of another building comprising two classrooms (Block E) on the north east corner of Block A. A new fence was built in 1950. A prefabricated Boulton and Paul classroom was added to the south east corner of the Block E in 1952. The three earliest buildings (Blocks A, B and D) which were roofed in asbestos slates, were reroofed in 1953 and the decorative roof fleches removed. During late 1954, the interiors and exteriors were painted. One acre of land opposite the school in South Pine Road was acquired for new tennis courts, funded by the efforts of the Enoggera State School Welfare Association. This project was completed in October 1954 and a demonstration match by local tennis stars was held at the opening event. School enrolments had reached 900 by 1954.

In August 1954, additional classroom building costing £7266 was planned for the Enoggera State School, replacing some of the temporary army huts. This building faced South Pine Road and was an extension to Block D comprising four classrooms and a library completed in 1955. In 1956, an addition of similar design was added to the Boulton and Paul structure on Block E, comprising five classrooms. Further additions in 1957 included a new classroom to the southern end of Block B and new toilets serviced by a new septic system: boys' toilets under a new classroom at the northern end of Block E and girls' toilets under the library at the eastern end of the Block D 1954 extension. Another new classroom was added to the northern end of Block C in 1958. The school had an enrolment approaching 1,000 by 1959. The Welfare Committee began fundraising to build a pool.

Changes to the education system occurred in 1963 with the abolition of the Scholarship Exam and the transfer of Year 8 to secondary school. The department transferred the 1956 northeastern wing (Block E extension) to the Everton Park State High School in 1965.The school site and the tennis courts site were re-gazetted in April 1966 as Reserve for School Purposes (R.758), comprising 1.66 hectares (4.1 acres).

The pool was built on a site in the northwest corner of the school yard - the site of the early tennis courts. The pool was completed in 1968, but the filtration system took a further year. The pre-school was planned and approved in 1973. Land was acquired for a pre-school building along Laurel Street in December 1973 and March 1974, totalling 1,822 square metres (0.450 acres). The pre-school opened in 1975. School enrolments were dropping back to the level of the 1920s. In 1978, the school properties on either side of South Pine Road were re-gazetted as R.758, Lots 1052 and 1053 on Sl8734. By 1985, enrolments were 250 students. When enrolments dropped to 120 in 1995, it meant the school was no longer entitled to a non-teaching principal. An area in front of Block D, (13.6 metres (45 ft) deep and 59 metres (194 ft) wide) was added to the road reserve in November 2000. A new multipurpose court was built to the east of Block D facing South Pine Road during the 2000s. In 2015, the school disposed of the tennis courts site on the southern side of South Pine Road (Lot 1053). Approval for the sale was given in June 2013 in order to fund the construction of a hall. The Enoggera State School Performing Arts Centre was built during 2016 on the site of the former pre-school; pre-school having been replaced by the Prep year in 2007. Year 7 moved to secondary school in 2015. By 2017 school enrolments were 300 students.

In 2019, the school continues to operate from its original site. It retains a complex of five suburban timber school buildings, with play areas, sporting facilities and courtyard spaces. The school is important to Enoggera, as a key social focus of the community, as generations of students have been taught there and many social events held in the school's grounds and buildings since its establishment.

== Description ==
Enoggera State School occupies a 1.38-hectare (3.4-acre) flat site in the suburb of Enoggera, approximately 6.5 kilometres (4.0 mi) northeast of Brisbane's CBD. Fronting South Pine Road to the south, the school is bounded on other sides by Laurel Street (north), residential properties (east) and a church (west). The school comprises a large complex of buildings, with most of the teaching buildings located at the southwest end of the site.

The earliest of the buildings (Blocks A, B and D) stand in a 'U'-shape, facing south and forming a courtyard fronting South Pine Road. The later of the significant buildings (Blocks C and E) stand symmetrically to the north of Block A, replicating building forms of the earlier buildings (Blocks B and D). Together, the complex of significant buildings is 'H'-shape in plan, with Block A located centrally, and each of the other buildings connected to its corners via verandahs: Block B to the southwest; Block to the northwest; Block D to the southeast; and Block E to the northeast.

=== Suburban timber school buildings ===
Blocks A, B, C, D and E are gable-roofed, timber-framed teaching buildings that are typical of the Suburban Timber School Building type. All of the buildings are rectangular in plan and are highset on tall piers - the pre-1931 buildings generally have face brick piers and the post-1931 buildings have concrete piers (some are now painted). No original ventilation fleches remain.

Teaching and administration spaces are located on the first floor, with sheltered play space to the understorey (the toilets, tuckshop and most store rooms are later enclosures). Two teachers rooms project diagonally from inner sides of the verandah intersections of the earliest buildings (Blocks A, B and D), and an additional teachers room projects east from the east verandah of Block C.

All interior spaces are accessed via verandahs and the remaining timber stairs are generally in their early locations. Block A has verandahs to the south, east and west sides. Blocks B, D, C and E all originally had verandahs on their east and west sides, although some have been modified:

=== Landscape features ===
The school's main entrance is centred on the significant buildings, with a concrete footpath leading from South Pine Road to the central stair of Block A. This footpath is intersected by a perpendicular footpath leading to Block B and Block D.

Views of the significant buildings from South Pine Road are important, particularly those from and across the front entrance footpath.

A turfed playing field is located at the northeast end of the site.

== Heritage listing ==
Enoggera State School was listed on the Queensland Heritage Register on 1 February 2019 having satisfied the following criteria.

The place is important in demonstrating the evolution or pattern of Queensland's history.

Enoggera State School (established in 1871) is important in demonstrating the evolution of state education and its associated architecture in Queensland.

The suburban timber school buildings, Blocks A and B (1916), Block C (1939), Block D (1931) and Block E (planned 1940, built 1950), represent the culmination of years of experimentation with light, classroom size and ventilation by the Department of Public Works. These standard government designed school buildings were an architectural response to prevailing government educational philosophies. The school reflects the development of Enoggera, as it evolved from a 19th-century farming community to an early 20th century suburban community.

The large suburban landscaped site, including playing field and sporting facilities, demonstrates educational philosophies that promoted the importance of play and aesthetics in the education of children.

The place is important in demonstrating the principal characteristics of a particular class of cultural places.

Enoggera State School is important in demonstrating the principal characteristics of a suburban Queensland State School complex. These include: teaching buildings constructed to a standard design by the Department of Public Works that incorporate classrooms with high levels of natural light and ventilation, verandahs and covered play spaces; standing on landscaped grounds with sporting facilities, and assembly and play areas.

The Suburban Timber School Buildings (Blocks A, B, C, D and E) are good examples of their type and have a high degree of integrity. They demonstrate the principal characteristics, including: a symmetrical plan of rectangular, gable-roofed, timber-framed wings, highset with play space beneath, and connected via continuous verandahs; verandahs with arched timber brackets and hat enclosures; projecting teachers rooms; coved ceilings of pressed metal and V-jointed (VJ) timber; deliberate placement of windows to light classrooms from the student's left hand side; and passive ventilation features including ceiling vents, and continuous vents at floor level (to Block A and B).

The place has a strong or special association with a particular community or cultural group for social, cultural or spiritual reasons.

Enoggera State School has a strong and ongoing association with past and present pupils, parents, staff members, and the surrounding community through sustained use since its establishment in 1871. The place is important for its contribution to the educational development of Enoggera, with generations of children taught at the school, and has served as a prominent venue for social interaction and community focus. Contributions to its operations have been made through repeated local volunteer action, donations, and the Parents and Citizens Association.
