= Berserker, Queensland =

Berserker
- Suburb
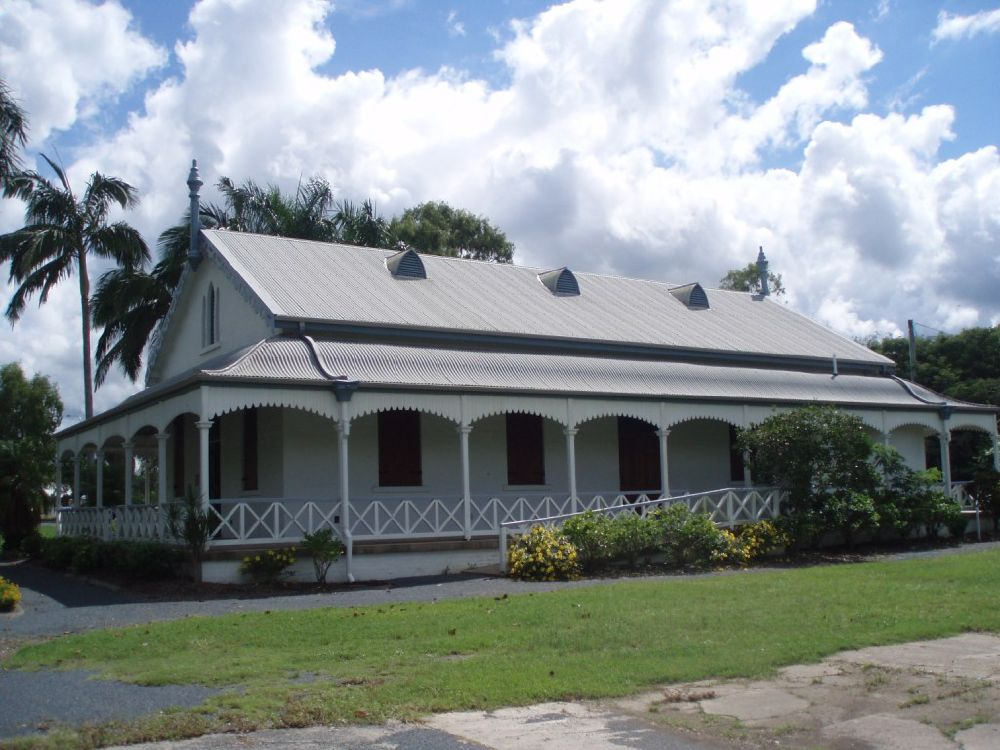
- North Rockhampton Borough Chambers, 2009

- Interactive map of Berserker
- Coordinates: 23.3652°S 150.5277°E
- Country: Australia
- State: Queensland
- City: Rockhampton
- LGA: Rockhampton Region
- Location: 2.4 km (1.5 mi) NE of Rockhampton CBD; 630 km (390 mi) NNW of Brisbane

Government
  - State electorates: Rockhampton; Keppel
  - Federal division: Capricornia

Area
  - Total: 4.7 km^{2} (1.8 sq mi)

Population
  - Total: 7,020 (2021 census)
  - Density: 1,494/km^{2} (3,870/sq mi)
- Time zone: UTC+10:00 (AEST)
- Postcode: 4701
Suburbs around Berserker
Park Avenue	Frenchville	Frenchville
Park Avenue	Berserker	Koongal
Rockhampton City	The Common	The Common

Berserker (/ˈbɜːrsərkər/ BUR-sər-kər) is a suburb of Rockhampton in the Rockhampton Region, Queensland, Australia. It is situated about six kilometres north east of the central business district.

In the 2021 census, Berserker had a population of 7,020 people.

== Geography ==
The eastern boundary is aligned with Frenchmans Creek and the western boundary follows Moores Creek.

In the northeast of the suburb is the Stockland Rockhampton shopping centre.

Swampy Lagoon is a waterhole (23.3666°S 150.5333°E).

== History ==
The suburb was named after the Berserker Range, which, in turn, was named by Rockhampton pioneer pastoralist Charles Archer after the Norse warrior "Baresark", who fought without armour in the Norwegian sagas. Although born in Scotland, the Archer family lived for many years in Larvik, Norway and members of the family moved between Queensland and Norway throughout their lives.

St Mary's Catholic Primary School was opened in 1900 by the Sisters of Mercy but was initially known as the North Rockhampton Roman Catholic School or St Francis' School. Initially the school operated from St Mary's Church then on Lakes Creek Road. In 1905, the school moved to the corner of Nobbs Street and Charles Street. In 1921 the school became known as St Mary's, possibly linked to the move of St Mary's Church to Nobbs Street (now adjacent to the school). In 1976 the first lay principal, Ron Rosentreter, was appointed.

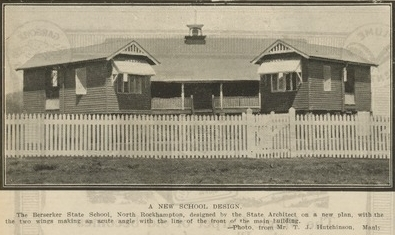
Berserker State School's first school building had two wings at an acute angle to the front of the main wing, 1917

Berserker State School opened in 1917 using a new design in which the two wings made an acute angle with the line of the front of the main building. Later that the year it was renamed Berserker Street State School. On 18 February 1957, a separate Berserker Street Infants State School was opened but it was closed on 1 July 1994.

Frenchville Sports Club was established in 1948. Despite the name, it is located at 105 Clifton Street in Berserker (23.3568°S 150.5295°E).

In 1956, North Rockhampton State High School was opened in Berseker.

The current North Rockhampton library was opened in 1971 with major refurbishment in 2011 followed by a minor refurbishment in 2015.

Kingsley College was founded by Peace Christian Church in 1993.

== Demographics ==
In the 2011 census, Berserker had a population of 7,179 people.

In the 2016 census, Berserker had a population of 6,875 people.

In the 2021 census, Berserker had a population of 7,020 people.

== Heritage listings ==
Berserker has a number of heritage-listed sites, including:

- Berserker Street State School, 128–140 Berserker Street
- North Rockhampton Borough Chambers, 20 Bridge Street
- St John's Anglican Church, 278 Ford Street

== Education ==
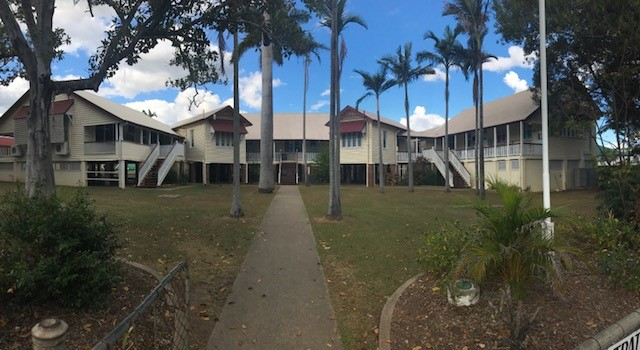
Berserker Street State School original 1917 building (centre) at the centenary, 2017

Berserker Street State School is a government primary (Preparatory to Year 6) school for boys and girls at 128–140 Berserker Street (23.3654°S 150.5299°E). It includes a special education program. In 2015, the school had an enrolment of 490 students with 38 teachers (36 full-time equivalent). In 2018, the school had an enrolment of 516 students with 39 teachers (37 full-time equivalent) and 42 non-teaching staff (28 full-time equivalent). The 1917 building with the unusual design is still extant at 2021.

St Mary's Catholic Primary School is a private primary (Preparatory to Year 6) school at 135 Nobbs Street (23.3652°S 150.5278°E). In 2018, the school had an enrolment of 356 students with 23 teachers (18.3 full-time equivalent) and 15 non-teaching staff (8.4 full-time equivalent).

Kingsley College (also known as Central Queensland Christian College) is a private primary and secondary (Preparatory to Year 12) school at 2 Schoolhouse Street (23.3723°S 150.5164°E). In 2018, the school had an enrolment of 94 students with 10 teachers (9.2 full-time equivalent) and 5 non-teaching staff (3.5 full-time equivalent).

There are no government secondary schools in Berserker. The nearest government secondary schools are North Rockhampton State High School in neighbouring Frenchville to the north and Rockhampton State High School in Wandal to the west.

== Amenities ==
The Rockhampton Regional Council operates the North Rockhampton Municipal Library at 154 Berserker Street (23.3647°S 150.5300°E).

Rockhampton Regional Council also manage the Bauhinia House Senior Citizens' Centre - a function centre with a maximum capacity of 300 people. Situated at 237 Berserker Street, it was officially opened on 9 December 1981 by Queensland's minister for health Brian Austin.

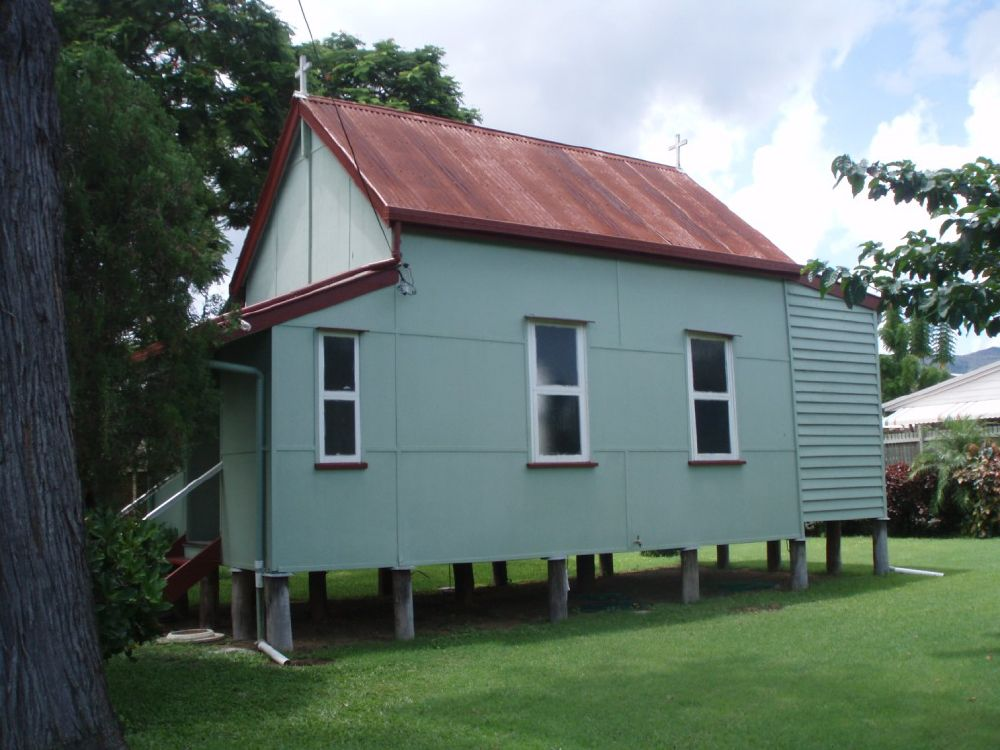
St John's Anglican Church, side view, circa 2003

St John's Anglican Church is at 278 Ford Street (23.3549°S 150.5264°E). It is part of the Parish of North Rockhampton (also known as the All Saints Anglican Community) within the Anglican Church of Central Queensland.

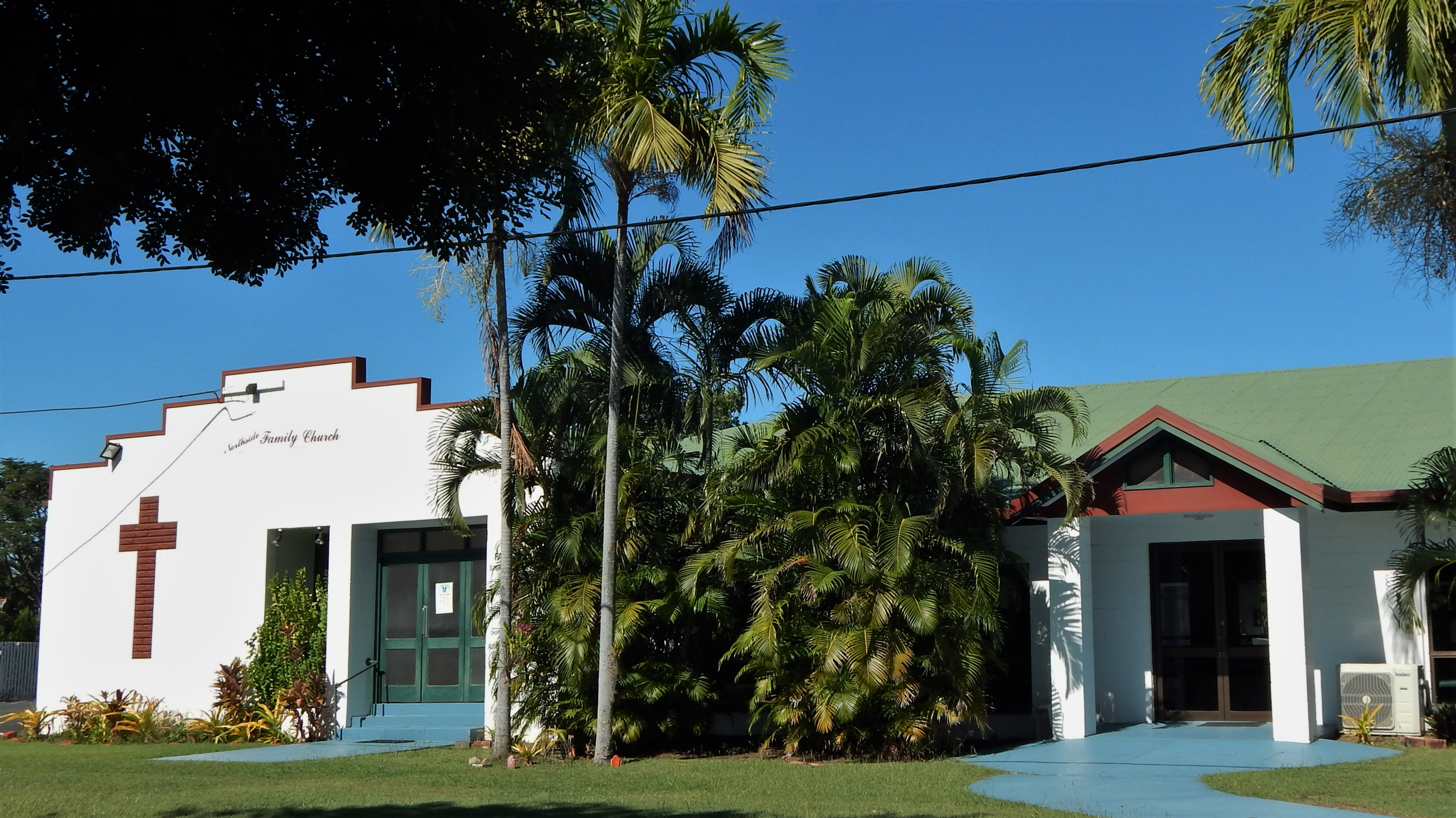
Northside Family Church, 2020

Northside Family Church is at 82 Thorn Street (23.3548°S 150.5270°E). It is part of the Australian Christian Churches.
