= Stockland Rockhampton =

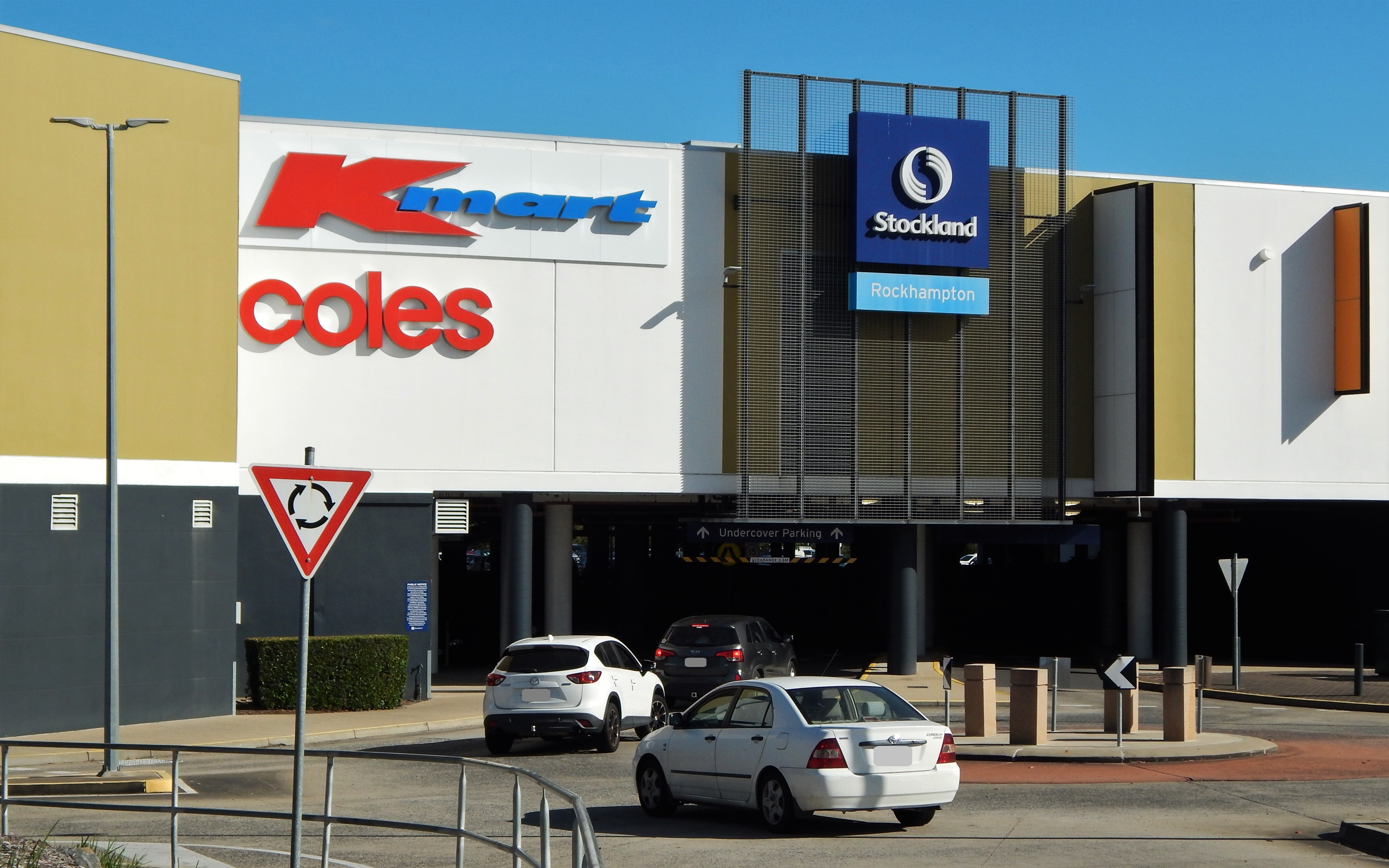
- Stockland Rockhampton, 2022
- Location: Rockhampton, Queensland, Australia
- Coordinates: 23°21′20″S 150°31′20″E
- Owner: Stockland
- Num. of stores: 190
- Num. of anchor tenants: 7
- Floor area: 59,500 m^{2} (640,453 sq ft)
- Floors: 1
- Parking: 3,100 Bays
- Website: stockland.com.au
- Information from Stockland.

Stockland Rockhampton is a shopping centre, located on the Bruce Highway in Park Avenue and Berserker in Rockhampton, Queensland, Australia.

== History and development ==
The centre was originally known as Rockhampton Shopping Fair, and was built in two stages, the first opening in 1985 and the second in 1988. It was acquired by Schroders Property Fund along with two other Queensland shopping centres in January 1992, and in March 1996, following a redevelopment focused on the theme "Where The Outback Meets The Reef", the centre won a Certificate of Merit in the International Council of Shopping Centers' 1996 Design Awards Competition. At the time of AMP Asset Management's acquisition of the centre in August 1999, it had a floor area of 36,137 square metres (388,975 sq ft) and was valued at A$99 million.

An internal refurbishment costing A$3 million was completed in late 2001 by Byvan, which included a new centre court design, new seating, a new Customer Services desk and new floors through the complex. The food court was revamped in 2002.

In 2003, property development company Stockland acquired the centre, after selling the City Centre Plaza complex in the Rockhampton CBD to the JF Meridian Trust (later onto Mirvac in 2008 and now 360 Capital in 2015). In 2004, following the centre's rebranding as "Stockland Rockhampton", it won the Property Council of Australia's Queensland Shopping Centre of the Year award in the 30,000–50,000 sqm category, with centre management, financial performance, marketing campaigns, operational factors, leasing and community involvement all being cited as reasons considered by the judges. It had been a runner-up for the same award in 1999.

== Redevelopment ==
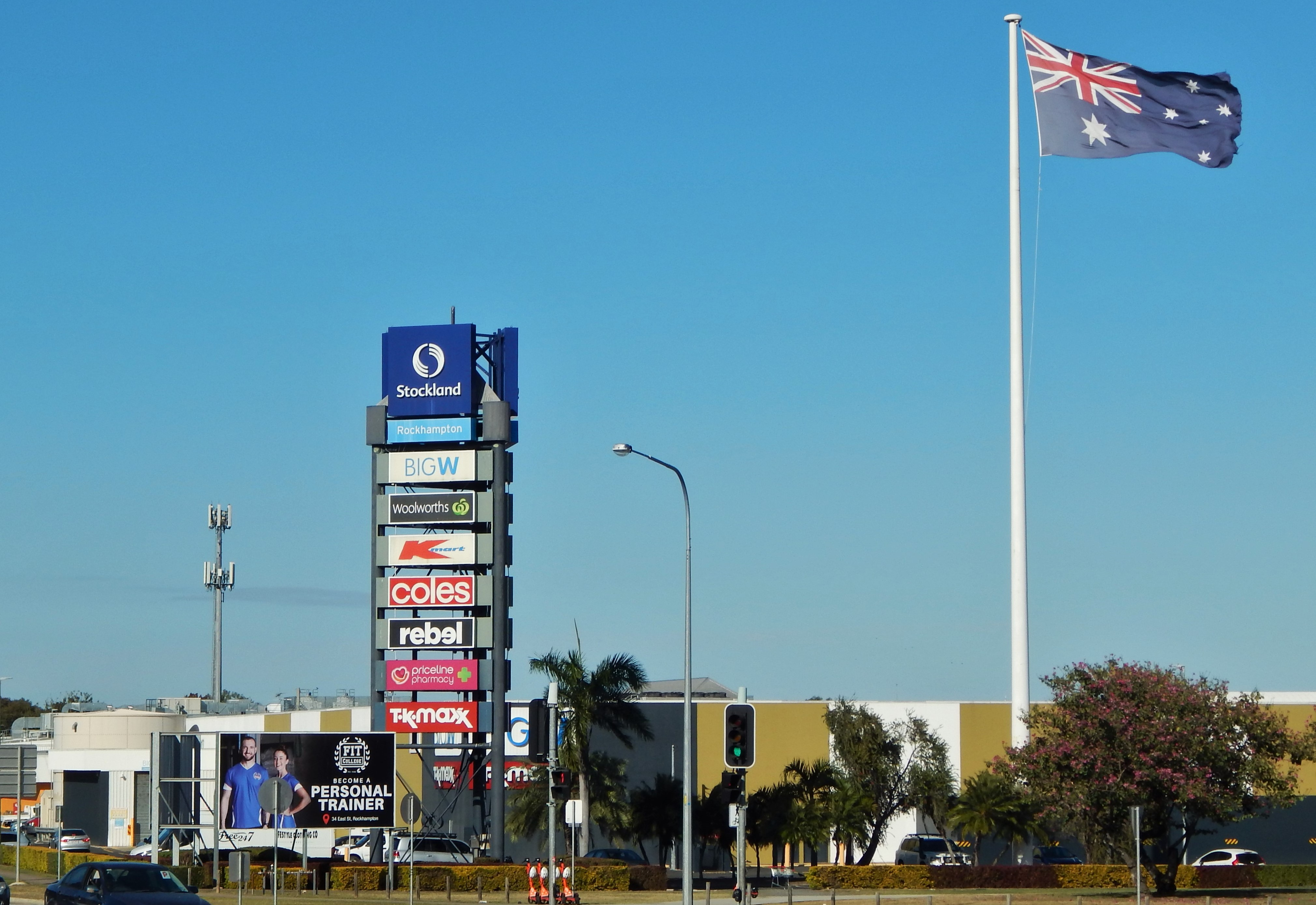
Stockland Rockhampton as seen from the intersection of Yaamba Road and Moores Creek Road, 2022

Development approval was granted in October 2006 to incorporate the neighbouring Kmart Plaza into the main centre, and construction has commenced. The redevelopment cost A$100 million and added approximately 75 specialty stores. The integration of the two centres was completed in 2009, opening on 13 August 2009 with full completion of the redevelopment achieved in 2010. Annual turnover at the centre for June 2008 was A$255.2 million, with a book value of $193.0 million. Stage two of the redevelopment was completed on 10 June 2010 with another 13 stores added to the centre.

In 2015 A $6.6 million stocklands project named the terrace created 80 new jobs in construction and retail. With an extra 1300 sq m of retail that involved a minor reconfiguration of the current centre and created a new dining terrace. Construction starts 6 July 2015, finishing early 2016.

In 2017 H&M said that they will be opening in the centre towards the end of the year. There has also been a $45 million expansion application lodged with the local Council which will intercorporate the centre with the on site cinema to create a new entertainment precinct. The expansion will allow a further 11 food outlets and 3 new mini majors.
