= St John's Anglican Church, Rockhampton =

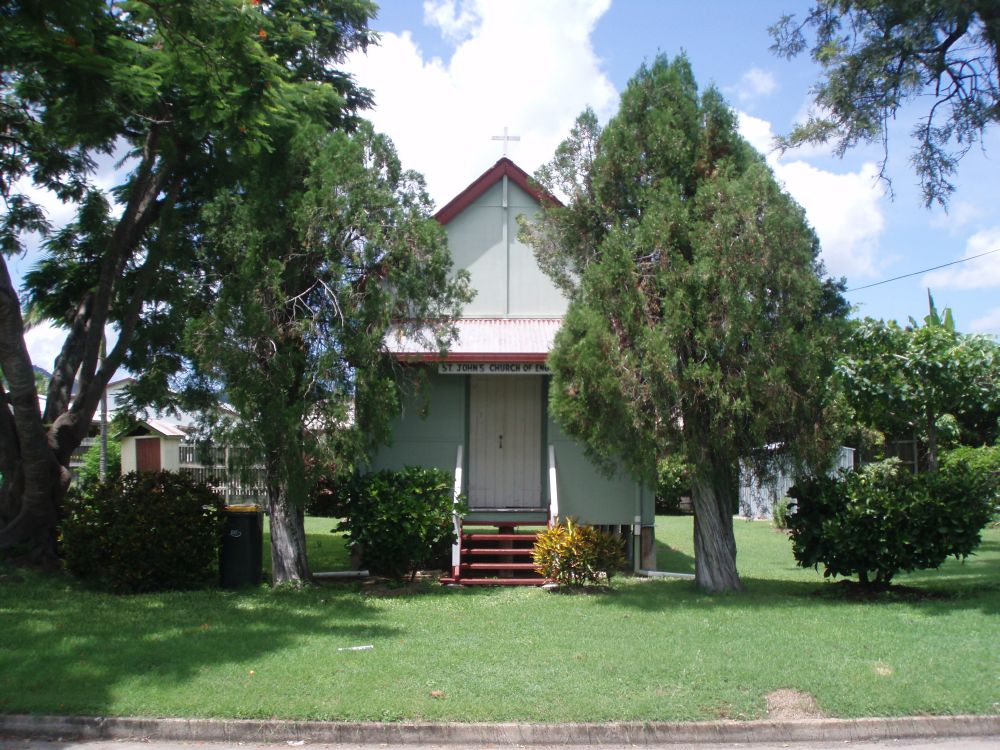
- St John's Anglican Church

- Location within Queensland Location within Australia
- 23.3549°S 150.5264°E
- Location: 278 Ford Street, Berserker, Rockhampton, Rockhampton Region, Queensland, Australia

History
- Design period: 1900–1914 (early 20th century)
- Built: 1912

Site notes
- Architectural style: Gothic

Queensland Heritage Register
- Official name: St John's Church
- Type: state heritage (built, landscape)
- Designated: 5 August 2003
- Reference no.: 602342
- Significant period: 1910s (historical) ongoing (social)
- Significant components: views to, trees/plantings, furniture/fittings, church, memorial – plaque

St John's Anglican Church is a heritage-listed church at 278 Ford Street, Berserker, Rockhampton, Rockhampton Region, Queensland, Australia. It was built in 1912. It was added to the Queensland Heritage Register on 5 August 2003.

== History ==
St John's Mission Church, a small Gothic-style timber building, was constructed in mid-1912 in Ford Street, North Rockhampton, in the heart of the district known as "Kanaka Town". It was the second place of worship to be built on the site, replacing a small mission room erected there in 1896.

South Sea Islanders (known as Kanakas) had been arriving in Rockhampton from the 1860s, indentured to work on the district's sugar cane plantations and inland pastoral properties. The first group were 189 men from Tanna, 30 of whom went to Peak Downs and 40 to the Barcoo.

Efforts were made by the Church of England to reach the South Sea Islander people in the Rockhampton district in the 1880s, coinciding with the formation of a new parish of North Rockhampton, and the movement leading to the establishment of the Church of England Diocese of Rockhampton in 1892. By 1889 there were 200 Islanders in Rev. Francis Drinkall Pritt's parish of North Rockhampton, 78 of whom where employed by the Yeppoon Sugar Company. Support of the South Sea Islander community by the Diocese extended to aiding Islander people to purchase land in the Creek and Ford Street area by registering property in the name of the Church or parish priest.

The site of St John's Mission Church was purchased in 1891 by Edward Costello. His association with South Sea Islanders has not been established, but in 1896 the South Sea Islander community of North Rockhampton erected St John's Mission Room on this land, with their own materials and labour. It was dedicated on 5 May 1896. The first baptisms of five men and four women from the South Sea Islander community took place at St John's Mission Room on 19 June 1896 and the first marriage there was celebrated on 15 December 1896. The South Sea Islander community used the small mission room for their weekday meetings and Sunday School, while worshipping at St Barnabas' Church, located about a kilometre away. The South Sea Islander community of North Rockhampton had been closely involved in the levelling and clearing of the St Barnabas' site in 1896. On 24 January 1899, the day of the dedication of St Barnabas' Church, a special service for South Sea Islanders was held, in which the greater part of the service was conducted in the Motu (Mota) language.

With their dedication to the Christian faith evident in their everyday life, the South Sea Islander community in Rockhampton was supported by the clergy, parish and synod in their fight against the Australian Government's Pacific Island Labourers Act 1901, which would force South Sea Islander people to return to their islands. The Synod of 1904 petitioned the Commonwealth Government on the Islanders' behalf to prevent their forced removal back to islands. This was especially pertinent for the Australian-born children of Islander families, and those who had lived as Australians for many years within the community.

By 1910 the mission room constructed near the present site of St John's Church had suffered major white ant damage, and plans were made to replace this building with a church of sturdier construction. On 19 January 1910 the site was acquired by the Anglican Diocese of Rockhampton for £10, and fund-raising for construction of a church commenced. By May 1912 the South Sea Islander community, working without parish assistance, had raised £60 for the construction of St John's Mission Church, the cost of which was estimated at £80.

The foundation stone was laid by Bishop of Rockhampton, George Halford, on 25 May 1912. About 30 South Sea Islanders were present and that the Bishop, clergy and people present proceeded round the site of the church, making their offerings at the foundation stone as they passed it while singing "Onward, Christian Soldiers". The church was completed and fenced by the end of October 1912 and the remaining £20 debt was cleared by the mission congregation in March 1913.

Two weekly services were held at the church, one on Sunday afternoons led by Frank Solomon, and another every Tuesday evening led by the Vicar. Born in the Solomon Islands, Mr Solomon was a lay reader and regularly led the congregation in evensong and services. After a lifetime of dedication to the church Frank Solomon, the Vicar's representative on the first St John's Mission Church Committee in 1912, died on 5 October 1945.

In the 1910s the South Sea Islander community of North Rockhampton expanded as families became more settled. By June 1913 a Sunday School had been established at St John's, and in 1916 the church building was enlarged with the addition of a sanctuary to the eastern end. By c. 1916 a silver wattle had been planted to the south of the building.

St John's Mission Church had an association for many years with the people of Menapi, Papua, who have on a number of occasions dedicated gifts to the North Rockhampton church. One of the most impressive is a clam-shell font on a carved pedestal.

Florence Amy Willie (1922 – 1981) was a community leader who was baptised here. She had ancestors from Ambrym in Vanuatu and she was also known as Florence Amy VeaVea. She went on to be a parish councillor who cared for this church. St John's Church celebrated its 50th anniversary on Sunday 28 October 1962. Improvements made to the church for its anniversary included cladding the exterior with fibrous-cement sheeting and painting, which was carried out by a team of voluntary workers. Two weeks later Mrs Pasawi and Mrs Crutwell from Menapi dedicated two pictures to St John's, one of the Last Supper and the other of Bishop George Ambo. It is possible that the pine trees either side of the front entrance to the church were planted around the time the front entry porch was enclosed.

Weekly services and Sunday School at St John's were an integral part of the South Sea Islander community at North Rockhampton and continued with few interruptions until recent times, when growth and expansion of South Sea Islander families has widely distributed community members throughout North Rockhampton and surrounding district. A small congregation still attends Sunday services at St John's. Although Sunday School no longer functions at the church, special services such as funerals or christenings and events on the Christian calendar, draw large attendances. St John's Church remains a significant part of the streetscape of Ford Street, and represents the physical, spiritual and material growth and development of the South Sea Islander community within Rockhampton.

== Description ==
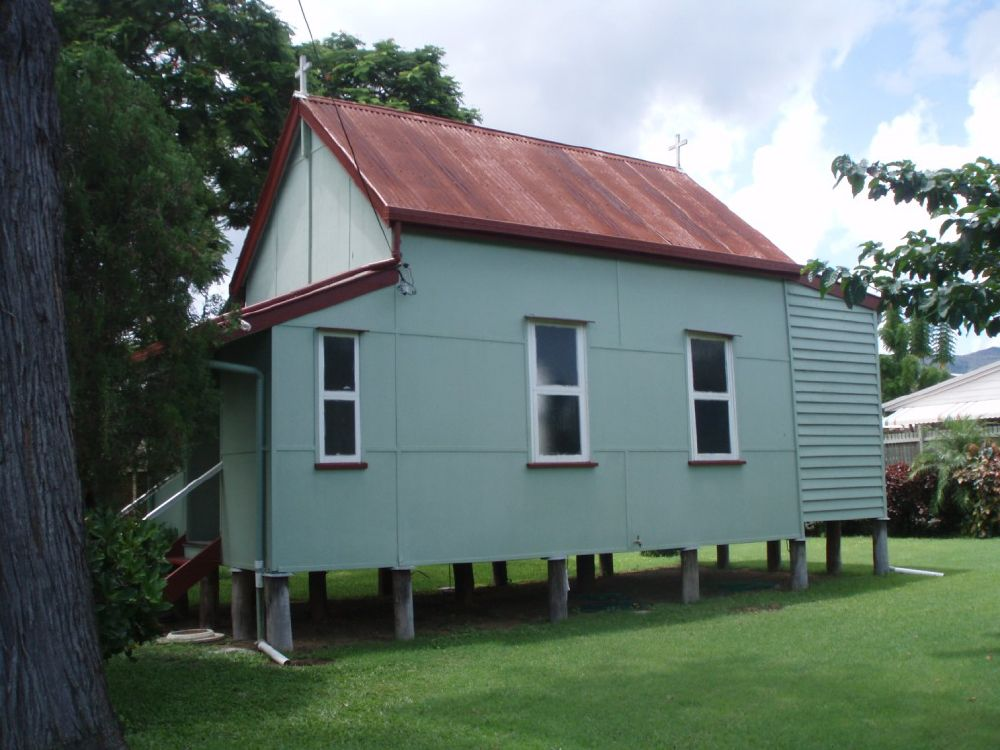
St John's Anglican Church, side view

St John's Anglican Church is situated in Ford Street, North Rockhampton, in the heart of "Kanaka Town". It is a small, timber-framed building, rectangular in form, with a main gable-roofed core, a hipped-roof sanctuary at the eastern end, and a small, skillion-roofed entry porch at the western end. The small, box-like church with its steeply pitched gabled roof of corrugated iron, pointed arch windows, original single-skin boarding and exposed stud walls expresses elements of Gothic style.

Most of the exterior of the building is clad with fibrous-cement sheeting, laid over the original chamferboard single-skin exposed-stud construction. The whole rests on timber stumps which vary in height from 0.75 metres (2 ft 6 in) at the western end, to 0.85 metres (2 ft 9 in) at the eastern end. All stumps have been either replaced or repaired.

The sanctuary at the eastern end of the building is windowless and is clad with weatherboards. The originally open-sided front entry porch at the western end of the building has side walls of fibrous-cement sheeting, each with a small rectangular window, and is accessed via central timber stairs. There is a skillion awning across the front of the church and the porch. The eastern internal wall of the porch is the original exposed-frame external wall of the main building, with the original timber double-entry doors which give access to the main hall.

There are two pointed arched windows in each side wall of the main hall, but the arched tops are now covered by fibrous-cement sheeting externally and are only evident from inside the church. Beneath each arch are two hopper windows.

The interior walls of the main hall and of the sanctuary are lined with single-skin chamferboards, now painted. The chamferboards in the main hall, which is of earliest construction, are wider than those in the sanctuary. The ceilings of both spaces have been lined with later fibrous-cement sheeting, which gives the appearance of continuity between the two sections. Flooring throughout is timber boards, but the floor of the sanctuary is raised.

In the main hall two rows of timber pews are arranged either side of a central aisle. Attached to the walls of this space are plaques and donated religious pictures. Suspended from the ceiling frame that lies between the sanctuary and main hall is a large timber crucifix. A framed print of Jesus and his disciples is positioned centrally along the wall above a gold coloured curtain. The main altar is positioned centrally in front of the curtain on the podium. At the eastern end of the main hall, between the pews and the sanctuary, church furniture includes a, timber prayer desk, timber chair, small podium, and a simply carved clam-shell font. The relief carvings adorning the pedestal of the font feature religious iconography relating to the life and crucifixion of Jesus. The dedication plaque on the base of the font, below the Crucifix relief reads:

To the Glory of God for use at St John's Mission Church, Ford Street North Rockhampton. This Shell was given by the people of St Bartholomew Menapi-Papua and Parish priests Father Norman Cruttwell and Father Amos Paisawa to the Mission Congregation of St Johns.

The font, pictures and prayer desk remain an integral part of the church, the font being functional, used for baptisms and special services, as well as being a distinctive piece of furniture.

The grounds of St John's Anglican Church comprise well kept lawns, with trees and shrubs surrounding the church and garden beds along the eastern and northern boundaries. Several trees – a poinciana, two pine trees framing the entrance to the church, and a large silver wattle – and shrubs delineate the church from the grass footpath that extends to Ford Street. The pine trees in particular add to the symmetry of the church and grounds.

== Heritage listing ==
St John's Church was listed on the Queensland Heritage Register on 5 August 2003 having satisfied the following criteria.

The place is important in demonstrating the evolution or pattern of Queensland's history.

St John's Anglican Church is important in demonstrating the evolution of Central Queensland's South Sea Islander community and a pattern of multicultural integration within Rockhampton and surrounding districts. The site of St John's Church has served the South Sea Islander community of Rockhampton since the St John's Mission Room, which stood near the present Church, was dedicated on 5 May 5, 1896. St John's Mission Church, erected in 1912 by the South Sea Islander community with no financial assistance from the Diocese of Rockhampton, represents a South Sea Islander custom of whole of community involvement in a matter deemed to be important and essential to the spiritual growth and moral well-being of the community.

The place is important in demonstrating the principal characteristics of a particular class of cultural places.

St John's Anglican Church is important in demonstrating the principal characteristics of a European religious building type adapted within South Sea Islander culture. With its pitched gable roof, crucifix finials, pointed arch motif windows (visible internally), porch and sanctuary, St John's Church illustrates the principal characteristics of a modest, Gothic-influenced, timber ecclesiastical building. The interior fabric of the Church retains high social significance for the South Sea Islander community, with many items, including a clam-shell font on a carved pedestal, providing a tangible link with the people associated with the Parish, and to their missionary benefactors in Menapi, Papua.

The place is important because of its aesthetic significance.

St John's Church remains a significant part of the streetscape of Ford Street, and as a remnant of North Rockhampton's "Kanaka Town", represents the physical, spiritual and material growth and development of the South Sea Islander community within Rockhampton.

Of special association with St John's and its streetscape value are the trees along the front boundary to the property: two distinctive pine trees planted on either side of the front entrance to the church; a poinciana tree; and a large silver wattle which is thought to be a remnant of the original plantings on the site, evident in a c 1916 photograph.

The place has a strong or special association with a particular community or cultural group for social, cultural or spiritual reasons.

St John's Anglican Church and prior mission room has a strong and special association for the South Sea Islander community for social, cultural and spiritual reasons. Socially, St John's has been the focus of community gatherings and events relating to events on the Christian calendar, prayer services, Sunday school, weddings, funerals, baptisms and social Church meetings. The place represents a link to the early Islanders who established a strong community both in the immediate neighbourhood and nearby regions that shared a spiritual link with the Church.

The place has a special association with the life or work of a particular person, group or organisation of importance in Queensland's history.

St John's has a special association with the clergy, parish and Synod who supported the South Sea Islander community's opposition to the Commonwealth Acts of 1901 that sought to return South Sea Islander people to their islands of origin against their will. St John's Church has special association with the activity of individuals within the South Sea Islander community and Anglican Church whose activities have been significant within the history of the region and state of Queensland, including Bishop George Halford, consecrated as Anglican Bishop of Rockhampton in 1909, who was greatly respected for his long and active support of the South Sea Islander community; and Frank Solomon, the South Sea Islander community's Vicar's representative on the first St John's Mission Church Committee, who dedicated his life to this church.
