= Florence Amy Willie =

Australian community leader (1922–1981)

- Born: Florence Amy VeaVea; 15 July 1922; Rockhampton, Australia
- Died: 7 June 1981 (aged 58); Rockhampton, Australia
- Education: Berserker Street State School
- Occupation: Parish councillor
- Known for: Care for her South Sea Islander community
- Spouse: Emil Gabriel Willie (m. 1942)
- Children: 13

Florence Amy Willie (née VeaVea; 15 July 1922 – 7 June 1981) was an Australian community leader of South Sea island heritage.

== Life ==
Willie was born in 1922 in Rockhampton into the South Sea Island Community; she was baptised at the community's St John's Anglican Church. Her parents were Constance (born Wolfer) and Edward "Bong" VeaVea. Her father had been born in Queensland but his father was called Sam Ambrym so he probably came from the Vanuatu volcanic island of Ambryn. Sam is thought to have had French ancestors too.

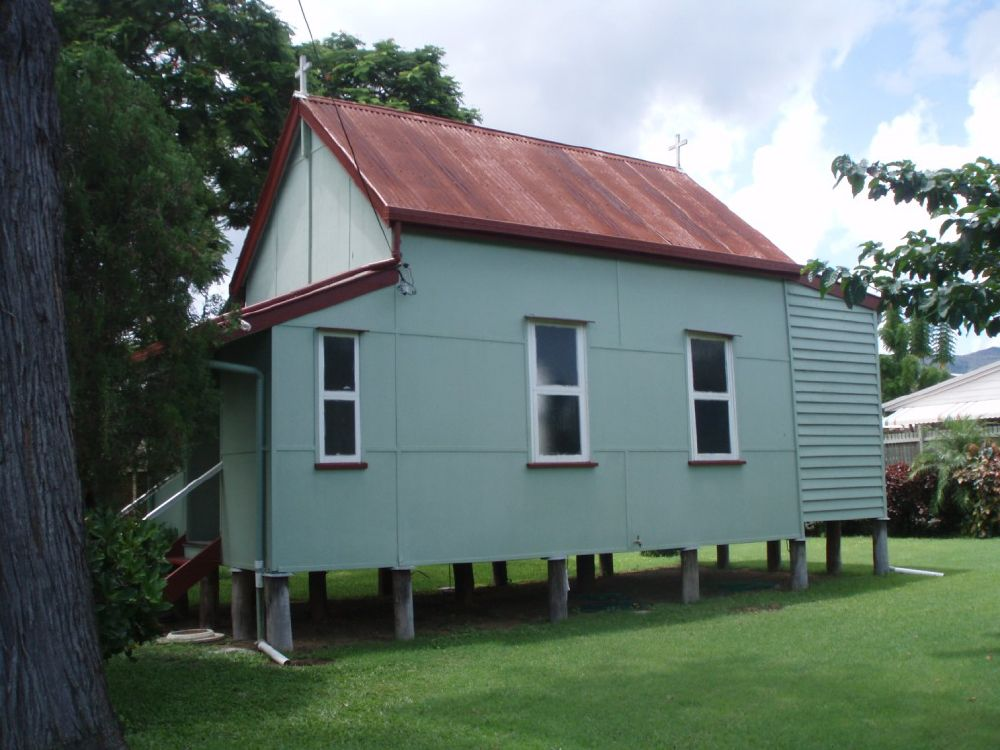
St John's Church - that she cared for

She lived in a community that had historically been oppressed. The local church had to petition the government to prevent the forced repatriation as required by the Commonwealth Pacific Island Labourers Act 1901. The act was a priority for the new Australian government and 10,000 South Sea Islanders were targeted to be removed by 1906. Dozens in the community were employed by a sugar company, but her father was a gardener.

Her family was one of six who lived in Creek Street in what was then called Kanaka Town in Rockhampton. They shared a kitchen and slept under corrugated iron roofs with no flooring and a toilet that had no roof. She gained her education at the church's Sunday School and at the Berserker Street State School. This school was under constant expansion as new students arrived. The school became a heritage building.

She continued to live on Creek Street after she married Emil Gabriel Willie who cut sugar cane in 1942. They had thirteen children of their own but this was added to when her parents died and they adopted her younger siblings. In addition to being a reliable parent she also served on the parish council. Her interest was in the church and she acted as its cleaner.

In 1973 electricity, modern houses and paved roads had arrived in Creek Street, and she moved into a new home. She died in 1981 in Rockhampton. Her husband and ten of their children were still alive. The church that she cared for is recognised as a heritage building.
