= Cannon Hill State School =

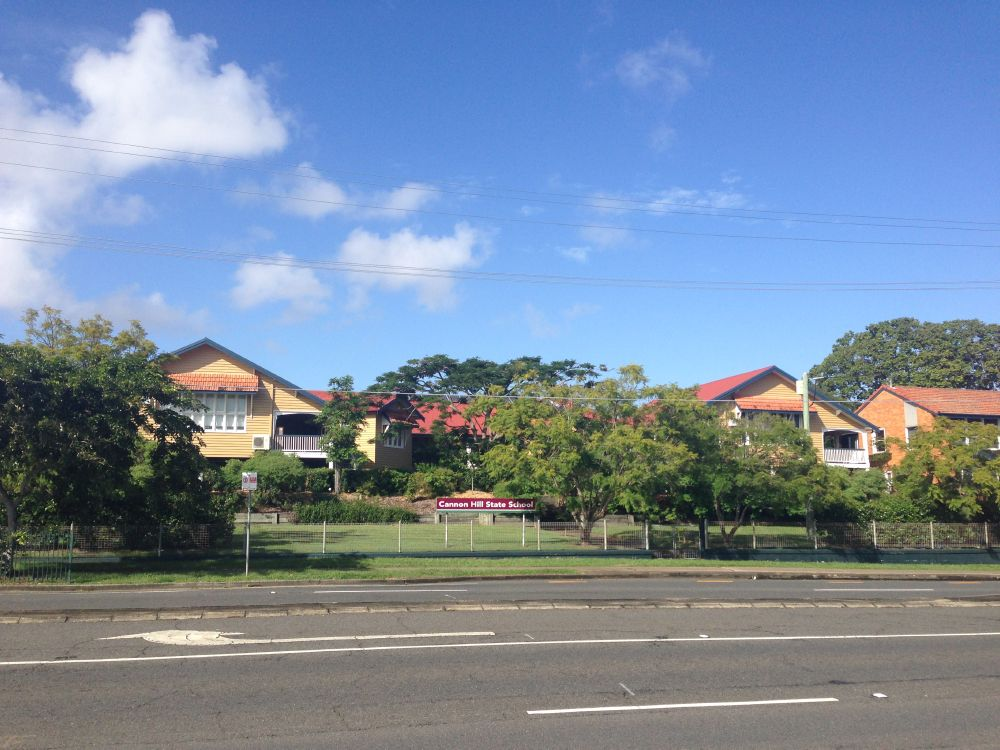
- Cannon Hill State School as seen from Wynnum Road, 2015

- Location within Queensland
- 27.4686°S 153.0831°E
- Location: 845 Wynnum Road, Cannon Hill, City of Brisbane, Queensland, Australia

Queensland Heritage Register
- Official name: Cannon Hill State School
- Type: state heritage
- Designated: 12 June 2015
- Reference no.: 602854
- Type: Education, research, scientific facility: School-state
- Theme: Educating Queenslanders: Providing primary schooling

Cannon Hill State School is a heritage-listed state school at 845 Wynnum Road, Cannon Hill, City of Brisbane, Queensland, Australia. It was added to the Queensland Heritage Register on 12 June 2015.

== History ==
Cannon Hill State School opened in 1915 on a 1.62-hectare (4.0-acre) site in the suburb of Cannon Hill, approximately 5 kilometres (3.1 mi) east of central Brisbane, to meet the demand for primary school education in the area. Suburban development after World War II spurred the construction of additional buildings to accommodate the school's growing pupil numbers. Cannon Hill State School comprises a complex of six school buildings, including one suburban timber school building (1915); a building designed to match it (1947, with 1957 highset timber building extension); a temporary classroom building (c. 1950-1), one highset timber school building (1954); a timber-framed school building incorporating open web floor trusses (1959); and one of the earliest state school swimming pools (1921); set in landscaped grounds with mature trees. The school has been in continuous operation since its establishment and has been a focus for the local community as a place for important social and cultural activities.

The provision of state-administered education was important to the colonial governments of Australia. Following the introduction of the Education Act 1860, which established the Board of General Education and began standardising curriculum, training and facilities, Queensland's national and public schools grew rapidly. The State Education Act 1875 provided for free, compulsory and secular primary education and established the Department of Public Instruction. This further standardised the provision of education, and despite difficulties, achieved the remarkable feat of bringing basic literacy to most Queensland children by 1900.

Prior to 1900, the development of the suburb of Cannon Hill was strongly linked to the establishment of local industries and the arrival of affluent settlers in the 1860s – including the Weedon family who, in 1867, built one of the earliest residences in Cannon Hill, known as "Cannon Hill House". Cannon Hill and its surrounding district were pastoral and agricultural during this time and the cultivation of sugar cane was the major local industry. A brickworks operated in Cannon Hill from about 1875 and by the late 1800s the suburb had become semi-industrial, although much of the area remained open bushland. With the establishment of a slaughterhouse in 1906, and the construction of abattoirs and livestock saleyards, Cannon Hill became known as a meatworkers' area in the early 1900s.

The growth of the suburb was stimulated by the establishment of the Swift Company, which built a large abattoir in 1913, described as one of the largest industrial operations undertaken in Queensland at the time. With the influx of residents, created by employment in the flourishing meatworks business, the demand for a local school in Cannon Hill increased significantly. The lack of a local school meant many children had to travel several kilometres to Bulimba, Norman Park or Hemmant to attend primary school.

The establishment of schools was considered an essential step in the development of early communities and integral to their success. Locals often donated land and labour for a school's construction and the school community contributed to maintenance and development. One of the most prominent families residing in Cannon Hill in the early 1900s was the Bartlett family, who owned a significant amount of land, including the portion of land that would later become the site for Cannon Hill State School. According to oral histories, the Bartlett family was strongly associated with the establishment of Cannon Hill State School, intentionally acquiring land for a local school, and subsequently selling four acres to the Department of Public Instruction in 1914. Walker James Bartlett was a member of the 1913 committee that promoted the establishment of a state school and once the school opened in 1915, became chairman of the first school committee.

To help ensure consistency and economy, the Queensland Government developed standard plans for its school buildings. From the 1860s until the 1960s, Queensland school buildings were predominantly timber-framed, an easy and cost-effective approach that also enabled the government to provide facilities in remote areas. Standard designs were continually refined in response to changing needs and educational philosophy and Queensland school buildings were particularly innovative in climate control, lighting and ventilation. Standardisation produced distinctly similar schools across Queensland with complexes of typical components.

Cannon Hill State School, which cost £3034, was officially opened on 25 September 1915 by the Hon. Herbert Hardacre, Minister for Public Instruction. The original school building, (Block B), is an intact example of a suburban timber school building (Type C/T8), with a U-shaped plan, comprising classrooms and two teachers rooms. The timber building was designed with one central and two side wings, roofed with Marseilles tiles, and metal ceiled. Each wing was divided into 22-foot (6.7 m) wide classrooms, divided by folding partitions. Ventilation features included hinged ventilation boards to floor level and prominent roof vents, or fleches, centrally mounted on the roof atop a system of metal ducts that ventilated the roof space. The functional and decorative fleches appear to have been removed between 1971 and 1974 (possibly in association with the replacement of the terracotta roof tiles with corrugated metal sheeting). Battened gable infills were also visible in the original design documents and early images of the school. This building type solved many of the problems of light, ventilation and classroom size that plagued previous school designs as well as providing what was considered the ideal, modern education environment. A significant feature was the construction of large windows, along with a particular classroom arrangement designed to maximise natural light from the left; a strategy developed by the Department of Works between 1894 and 1914.

Under the stewardship of the Department of Public Works, which retained responsibility for schools until 2013, and through the involvement of some of Queensland's most innovative architects, school buildings became more advanced and diverse. This was the outcome of years of systematic reform and experimentation. The suburban timber school building demonstrates these advances in school architecture, especially in lighting and the building layout. Visiting Cannon Hill State School in 1915, the Hon. Herbert Hardacre (Minister for Public Instruction) praised Cannon Hill State School as "best in the state on grounds of health and economy" and suggested it was a high-water mark in school architecture. John Douglas Story (Under Secretary, Department of Public Instruction) termed the school "the most scientific building yet erected" in Queensland and maintained that "it lent itself in every way to the healthy education of the children".

In 1916, the school's sports ground was established at a cost of £45, marking the start of a number of landscape modifications to Cannon Hill State School. The provision of outdoor play space was a result of the early and continuing commitment to play-based education, particularly in primary school. Trees and gardens were planted as part of beautification of the school. In the 1870s, schools inspector, William Boyd, was critical of tropical schools and amongst his recommendations stressed the importance of the adding shade trees to playgrounds. In addition, Arbor Day celebrations began in Queensland in 1890. Landscape elements were often constructed to standard designs and were intrinsic to Queensland Government education philosophies. Educators believed gardening and Arbor Days instilled in young minds the value of hard work and activity, improved classroom discipline, developed aesthetic tastes, and inspired people to stay on the land. Aesthetically designed gardens were encouraged by regional inspectors. On Arbor Day 29 April 1916, 120 trees and shrubs were planted in the school grounds. The Minister of Education, visiting the school in September 1919 to open a tennis court, noted the school grounds had been transformed by two beautifully laid out gardens including rose bushes, sweet peas and carnations.

Schools became a community focus, a symbol of progress, and a source of pride, with enduring connections formed with past pupils, parents, and teachers. The inclusion of war memorials and community halls reinforced these connections and provided a venue for a wide range of community events in schools across Queensland. On 23 September 1919, a war memorial comprising an avenue of various trees was planted in the grounds. In 2007, a war memorial plaque was added to the school, next to a mature rosemary bush.

In 1921, one of the earliest state school swimming-pools was built at Cannon Hill State School by the school community, volunteers and parents, at a cost of £496. There was minimal funding from the Department of Public Instruction and construction relied on donations from Kelly Brickworks at Murrarrie. The pool, noted on the 1915 site plan, was the fourth state school pool in Brisbane, with school baths already established at Junction Park State School (1910), Wooloowin State School (1916) and Ascot State School (pre-1921). The construction of the pool, a concrete shell with concrete paved areas adjacent (18.3 by 6 metres (60 ft × 20 ft)), was a community response to a near drowning tragedy in a local waterhole. Despite the lack of funding, the Cannon Hill community succeeded in building the pool, necessary change sheds and amenities by hosting working bees at weekends. The commitment shown in the construction of the pool strongly highlights the significant relationship between Cannon Hill State School and its local community. The pool, which retains the dimensions noted in a 1946 drawing, has been in continuous use since its official opening on 9 December 1922, demonstrating its important function to the local community over the past century.

Enrolment numbers remained steady over the following three decades - largely due to the establishment of Morningside State School in 1926 - until suburban growth after World War II spurred a building program. Like other state schools across Brisbane, Cannon Hill State School experienced a rapid increase in pupil numbers post-1945 which, in conjunction with a shortage of building materials, causing drastic overcrowding. In December 1949, The Courier-Mail reported that Cannon Hill State School expected 90 to 100 new enrolments in the coming year, on top of its 420 existing pupils.

This was a nationwide occurrence and, to cope, many new buildings were constructed and existing buildings were extended. At Cannon Hill State School, a new building, Block F, was added in 1947 and connected to Block B via a raised verandah walkway. Block F shares many features with Block B: its classroom width, use of folding partitions, its verandah layout and external detail; however, it also clearly demonstrates features typical of its period: boarded ceilings with metal tie rods and lack of ventilation flaps.

A temporary building (Block C), was constructed at Cannon Hill between 1950 and 1951 to accommodate increasing enrolment numbers. This building combined the conventional construction techniques and design characteristics of earlier buildings on the site, with aspects of the Department of Public Works prefabricated buildings constructed for the commencement of the 1951 school year. A factory at Hamilton was established to construct these temporary school buildings, with extensive pre-cutting under way in 1951. Panels for external walls were prefabricated from tongue and groove (T&G) boarding.

Temporary buildings were constructed in Queensland schools between 1943 and 1951. This standard type was introduced as an expedient, temporary solution to the exceptional growth in student numbers in the immediate post-war period when skilled labour was scarce and materials were in short supply. They were small timber buildings, lowset on concrete piers, with skillion or gabled roofs clad with corrugated metal sheets. External walls were clad with vertical T&G timber boards and the rear wall had casements with operable fanlights sheltered by a simple hood. Accessed from a verandah, the type comprised two classrooms 21 by 18 feet (6.4 m × 5.5 m), which was consistent with the department's ideal dimensions of the time. The design, materials and form were a departure from earlier types, did not influence subsequent designs, and only a small number of them were constructed. While the classroom sizes differ, strong similarities exist between this Works Department temporary classroom (Type E/T5) and Block C, especially its gabled roof (introduced after 1949), casement windows with fanlights and vertical boarding. The timber building, comprising three classrooms as well as a teachers room by 1952, is a modification of a standard plan with the addition of a hat room as a verandah annexe and hinged ventilation boards to the verandah wall. Few buildings of this type survive.

From 1950 the Department of Public Instruction introduced and developed new standard plans for school buildings. These new standards were based on conventional construction yet incorporated concepts derived from the imported prefabricated systems including large banks of glazing and a 4-foot (1.2 m) design module. These buildings were highset timber-framed structures and the understorey was used as covered play space. Introduced in 1950, the principal type (F/T4) was a long and narrow building with a gable roof. A semi-enclosed stair connected the understorey to a north facing verandah running the length of the building. Classrooms opened off the verandah and had extensive areas of windows; almost the entirety of the verandah wall and the opposite classroom wall were glazed, allowing abundant natural light and ventilation. This type was the most commonly constructed in the 1950s in Queensland. A highset timber school building (Type F/T4) with a semi-enclosed stair, comprising three classrooms, and a library, (Block E), was constructed at Cannon Hill in 1954. This building runs east–west, with a verandah protecting the northern side. This was a contemporary Works Design practice that evolved from the sectional school design. A 1957 extension to the east of Block F followed the same design principle. Educationalists argued that the ideal orientation of classroom buildings was 10 degrees east of north, with verandahs protecting the northern side and classrooms facing south. This led to the construction of school buildings that were oriented in relation to the sun rather than the site boundaries. This orientation was approximately consistent with the existing axial siting of the majority of existing buildings at Cannon Hill State School.

In 1954 the type was improved by replacing the proliferation of stumps in the understorey with a timber truss that spanned the width of the classroom and provided an unimpeded play space. This concept was further refined in 1957 by replacing the timber truss with a steel open-web joist that spanned further and removed more understorey stumps. This structural system was employed with reinforced concrete piers to support large loads at minimal cost. This particular concept was applied in the 1959 construction of Block A, a two-storey brick and timber building (Type F/T7) stepped in section to link with Block B by a walkway. This structure was supported on concrete columns and steel open web joints with a cantilevered portion supporting the verandah. The understorey of Block A was left open for playing until the design was modified to add another classroom on the lower level. The use of brick in the construction of Block A follows a structural scheme typical of 1950s school architecture. It was partially constructed on land acquired in 1957 after the Department of Public Instruction purchased a property, to the west of the school on Wynnum Road, for future extensions to the school.

Other modifications to the school included: the construction of Block G (one classroom) in 1951 and Block D in 1955 (four classrooms); an extension to Block C in 1957; the removal and subsequent rebuilding of Block G in 1970 (three classrooms on two levels); the addition of a toilet block in 1970; the construction of a retaining wall to the north and east of the sports ground in 1972; the removal of the teachers residence and the subsequent construction of a pre-school centre in 1974; construction of a tuckshop in 1981 (since removed); the removal of Block D in 1987 following arson damage; the construction of a new toilet block; and the 1988 conversion of the southern toilet block to a covered play area, stores and janitor's room. The pool dressing sheds were demolished and replaced after 2009.

Landscape features still visible at the Cannon Hill State School include mature trees. Numerous mature fig trees grow in the school grounds, with two notable trees located along the path leading from the pool area to the sports ground. Two mature mango trees survive - one near the parade ground north of Block C, which survives from the original private residence gardens, and another from the former teachers residence garden, located near the southern end of the sports ground. During the 1916 Arbor Day, the Hon. HF Hardacre (Minister for Public Instruction) was present when the first Anzac tree, a silver wattle, was planted at Cannon Hill State School. A silver wattle, located just outside Block A facing Wynnum Road, may represent a continued landscaping practice. The front gardens retain the original 1914 pathway and terracing layout, and an avenue of trees, including a mature palm tree, lines the pathway from Block A to Block C.

In 2015, Cannon Hill State School celebrates the school's centenary, with a provisional museum already established at the school, honouring Cannon Hill State School's significant history and community efforts.

Considering the school's continuous operation since 1915, the school has played an important part of Cannon Hill's history, teaching generations of students. The school has been a key site for social meetings and activities since its establishment, including school dances, held there as early as 1916; May fairs and fetes, agricultural shows, welcoming soldiers home from the First World War, and school concerts, each one bringing together the school and local community over the past century. It retains an array of representative Department of Public Works-designed buildings and an early swimming pool set in landscaped grounds with mature shade trees.

== Description ==
Cannon Hill State School occupies a 2.44 hectares (6.0 acres) site bounded by Wynnum Road to the north, Molloy Road to the east, Princess Street to the south, and residential properties that front Narela Street to the west. Prominently positioned above the main road through Cannon Hill, the school is a landmark in the suburb. The main entrance to the school is along Wynnum Road, where the original timber school building, Block B, remains a striking feature of the streetscape. The site slopes gently to the south and east. The school buildings, parade ground, swimming pool and tennis courts are concentrated on the northern half of the site, with playing fields and a pre-school situated to the south.

The school complex comprises a variety of educational buildings, amenities and landscape features of varying eras of design and construction. Of these, significant components include:

All buildings are axially sited, aligned parallel and perpendicular to Wynnum Road. Blocks B, E and F are timber-framed, weatherboard-clad and highset on concrete piers, with timber-framed windows and corrugated metal-clad gabled roofs.

Block G and various modern ancillary structures including toilet blocks, a dental clinic, covered play areas and a large structure adjacent to the pool, are not considered to be of cultural heritage significance. Other non-significant elements include modern carpet and linoleum floor linings, kitchenettes, acrylic panels to window openings, modern benches and storage cupboards, and aluminium windows.

=== Block B – suburban timber school building (1915) ===
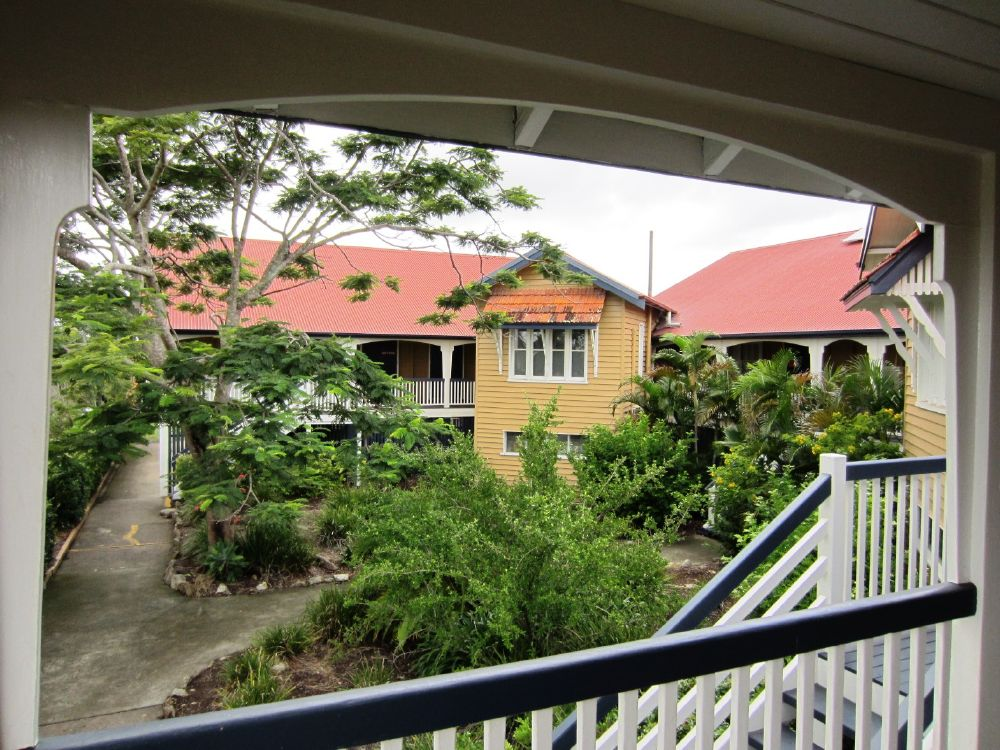
1915 Suburban Timber School Building, 2015

Block B is a large, symmetrically arranged timber school building comprising a U-shaped footprint of three main gable roofed classroom wings, connected by continuous verandahs to the north side. The building exhibits typical characteristics of a suburban timber school building, Type C/T8. All classrooms are 22 feet (6.7 m) wide and verandahs are 10 feet (3.0 m) wide. The east and west wings (formerly 2 classrooms each) are a mirror image of each other (with the exception of later modifications), with verandahs along both east and west elevations. The central wing (formerly 3 classrooms) is longer, with a verandah to the north elevation only. Two small, gable-roofed teachers rooms project diagonally from the inner junctions of the wings, with one of two original verandah cloak rooms retained opposite. Six sets of open timber stairs provide access to the verandahs, and the building is connected to Block F to the south and Block A to the west via covered verandah walkways.

The north (front) elevation is symmetrically composed. Protruding gable ends of the east and west wings each feature a bank of windows, eight narrow sashes wide by three sashes high, flanked by open verandah ends. The windows to the east wing comprise casement windows to the bottom row, horizontal-pivot sashes to the middle and fanlights to the top. The windows to the west wing have been replaced with aluminium framed casements to the two bottom rows, with fanlights above. The gable end windows are sheltered by wide, terracotta-tiled window hoods with decorative timber brackets. This window and sunshade configuration is mirrored on the southern elevations of the east and west wings, and the exposed southern wall of the central wing also features a similar window configuration. Clear acrylic panels have been affixed to the inside of the majority of window openings.

The building retains much of its original timber ornamentation. The wide gabled roofs have open eaves with decorative timber brackets. Exposed framing is visible to the single skin verandah walls and the raked verandah ceilings are lined with timber v-jointed (VJ), tongue-and-groove (T&G) boards. Joinery to the verandahs includes: timber posts with decorative arched brackets; two-rail timber balustrades with battened balusters; panelled double doors with fanlights; and horizontal-pivot sash windows above door height. The outer verandahs of the east and west wings are partially enclosed. The east wing enclosure retains original weatherboard cladding (with some later modifications), whilst the west wing enclosure (c. 1977) is more extensive and includes a passageway and external stair added at the southern end. Bag hooks are attached to the wall of the outer verandah of the west wing.

The central wing is divided into two classrooms, with a small amenity area between, separated by modern concertina doors. The east and west wings are both open-plan. The original classroom layouts of all wings are evident from the bulkhead partitions retained where the original folding partitions have been removed. Internally, the three classroom wings and teachers rooms all have timber floors (lined with modern vinyl and carpet), and walls lined with VJ, T&G boards. Hinged ventilation boards survive at the base of verandah walls, although painted closed and externally sealed in some locations. The classroom wings have modern suspended ceilings and lighting, though it is possible that pressed metal ceilings remain above. The projecting teachers rooms walls are lined with timber VJ, T&G boards and the original pressed metal ceilings and decorative air vents have been retained. The cloak room located on the verandah at the junction of the central and west wings is formed by partitions lined with single skin VJ, T&G boards, with open timber shelves. The cloak room partitions are mirrored on the east wing side; however, the construction of the doorway through to the verandah walkway to Block F has resulted in the removal of the original timber shelves and construction of an enclosed storage space.

The understorey has a concrete slab floor, is partially enclosed by vertical timber battening and chain wire storage areas, and is used as a covered seating and play area. The weatherboard cladding to the teachers' rooms extends to form storage rooms below.

=== Block F – suburban timber school building (1947), with high set extension (1957) ===
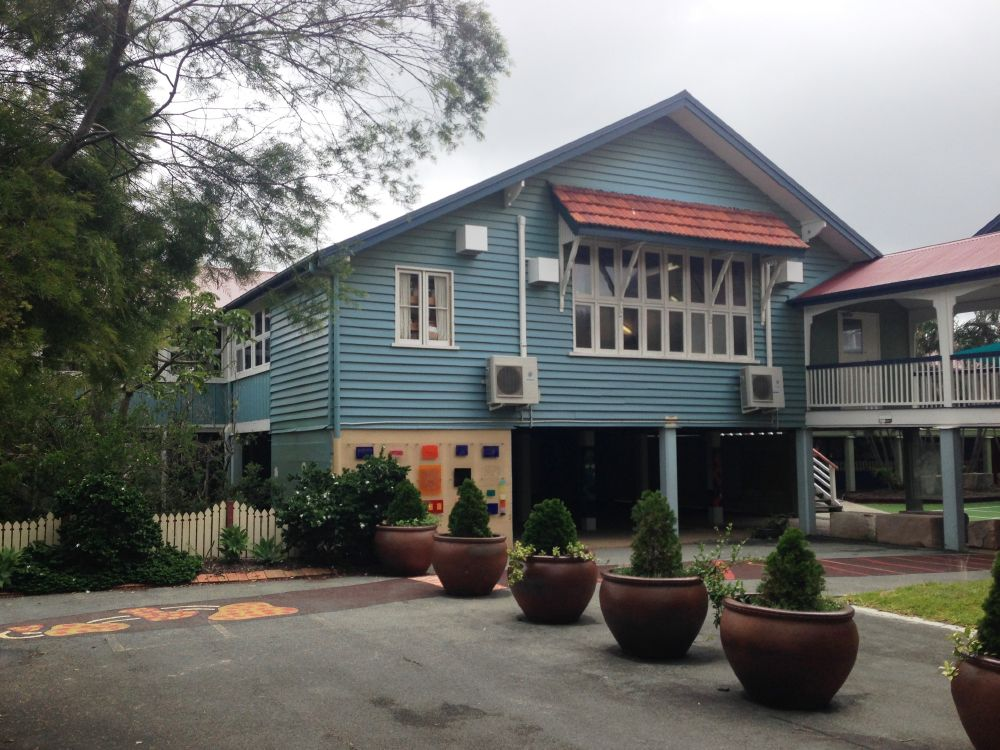
1947 Suburban Timber School Building extension (Block F), 2015

Situated to the south of Block B, Block F comprises two sections: a highset, gable roofed building (1947) sited parallel to Molloy Road; and a perpendicular, gable roofed extension to the west (1957), connected by an enclosed L-shaped verandah.

The 1947 section of Block F aligns with the east wing of Block B, and is similar in plan, form, fenestration and external detailing. External timber stairs provide access to the west verandah which is enclosed with aluminium-framed hopper windows. An additional bank of aluminium-framed hoppers are housed in the southern end and a casement window is located at the enclosed northern end of the east verandah (now a kitchenette). The 1957 extension is highset on concrete piers with a semi-enclosed play space underneath. The building exhibits some of the characteristics of a highset timber school building with semi enclosed chairs, Type F/T4, including: highset timber-framed structure on concrete stumps; external cladding carried through both levels; verandah bag racks; and extensive use of hopper windows to the southern elevation. The 8-foot (2.4 m) wide north facing verandah is enclosed with aluminium-framed hopper windows and accessed via an external set of timber stairs. The exposed southern elevation features a large bank of timber-framed hopper windows, three sashes high.

Extensive interior modifications have resulted in an open-plan classroom space across the 1947 and 1957 sections of Block F. Above the large openings created in the former 1947 verandah walls, banks of original high-level horizontal-pivot windows remain, along with timber VJ, T&G board linings. The 1947 raked ceilings are also lined and feature metal tie rods, whilst the 1957 flat ceiling is lined in flat sheeting with cover-strips. The former layout of the 1947 building (2 classrooms) is evident, with some verandah doorway openings with fanlights retained, as well as VJ, T&G lined partition bulkheads where the original folding timber partitions have been removed.

The understorey of the building has a concrete floor and is used as a covered seating and play area. Weatherboard cladding extends to ground level to enclose the east and south elevations of the 1957 extension, with corrugated metal sheeting enclosing the southwest corner of the 1947 building.

=== Block E – highset timber school building with semi-enclosed stair (1954) ===
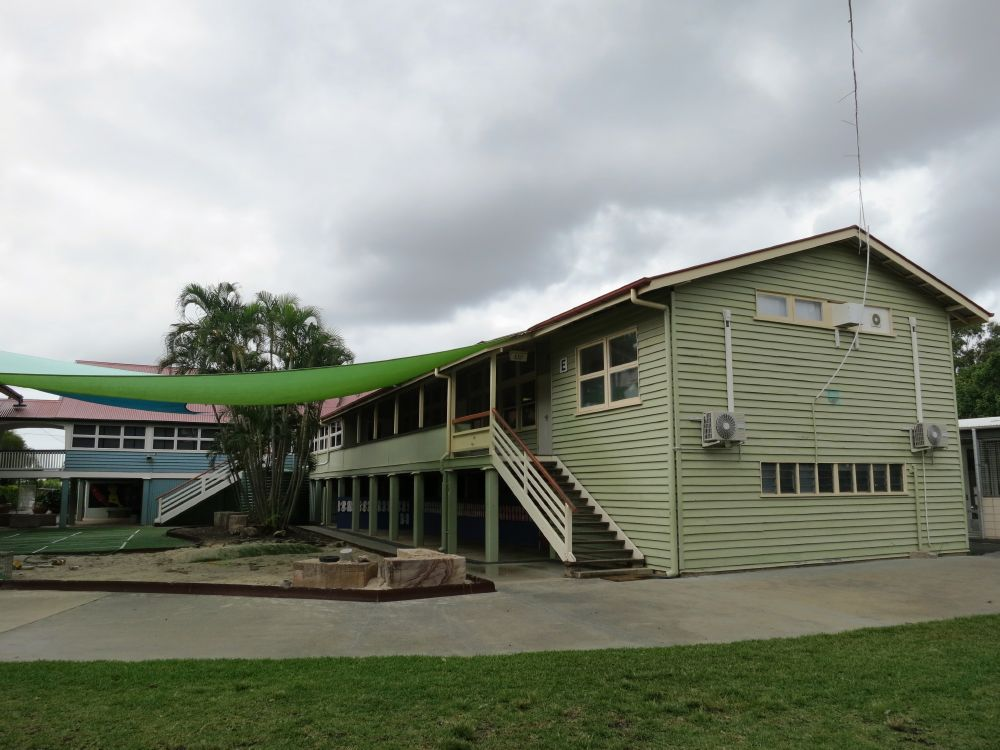
1954 Highset Timber School Building (Block E), 2015

Connected to the western verandah of Block F, Block E exhibits characteristics of a highset timber school building with semi enclosed chairs, Type F/T4. The building comprises three classrooms and a smaller end room, with a partly enclosed verandah to the north elevation. The verandah is accessed from the west by a set of open timber stairs. The partially enclosed understorey is used as a covered play space, with weatherboard cladding extending to form change rooms at the western end.

The southern elevation features a large bank of hopper windows, 16 sashes wide by three sashes high, with an additional two-sash-wide bank of hopper windows at the western end. Windows on the northern verandah wall are double-hung sashes with fanlights. A bag rack extends the length of the verandah. Internally, the classrooms walls, partitions and flat ceiling are lined with flat sheeting with cover-strips. A large opening has been formed in one of the classroom partitions, with smaller internal "windows" formed in the other two original partitions. One set of original interior double doors remains in-situ.

=== Block C – temporary classroom (c. 1950–51) ===
Block C is a lowset structure (c. 1950–51) with vertical tongue-and-groove board cladding, half-gabled roof and a partially enclosed northern verandah. A gable roofed former teachers' room projects from the northern elevation. The chamferboard clad extension (1957) to the west is not of cultural heritage significance.

The building (formerly 3 classrooms) exhibits characteristics of a Type E/T5 including vertical T&G board cladding, north facing verandah and casement windows with fanlights. The composite structure incorporates the prefabricated panels typical of prefabricated timber school buildings by the Works Department, Type F/T2 with conventional construction and design characteristics consistent with earlier buildings on the site.

All walls are single skin, with vertical T&G board cladding on the exterior of the east, west and south walls, and interior of the northern, verandah wall. The east, west and south walls exhibit characteristics of pre-fabricated construction, comprising pre-fabricated panels set within timber framework. The south and east elevations feature banks of two-light casement windows with fanlights, whilst windows to the verandah wall are double-hung three-light sashes.

Block C is accessed via a modern deck that connects with the eastern end of the verandah, from which classrooms are entered via early timber-boarded double-doors with fanlights. The verandah wall retains characteristics of earlier standard designs, including hinged ventilation boards, and bag hooks attached to the exposed wall framing. The verandah has a two-rail balustrade with battened balusters to the east of the former teachers room, and enclosed bag racks with lattice over to the west. The raked verandah ceilings are lined with VJ, T&G timber boards. A weatherboard-clad storeroom is located at the eastern end of the verandah. The projecting former teachers room is weatherboard-clad with casement windows, and the ceiling is lined with flat sheeting with cover strips. The north and east windows are sheltered by timber-framed window hoods.

Early interior walls and partitions have exposed framing and are lined with VJ, T&G boards. Internal classroom arrangements have been reconfigured, with the original doors and partitions partly or fully removed. Some lintels remain to indicate the former partition layout. The ceiling is coved and flat sheeted, with metal tie rods retained. There is a large opening to the wall between the earlier building and the 1957 extension.

=== Block A – timber-framed school building with open web floor trusses (1959) ===
Block A is a long, gable roofed building sited parallel to Wynnum Road and connected to Block B via a covered walkway at its east end. The asymmetrically arranged building is stepped to respond to the site gradient and comprises two main sections: a double storey brick block to the east; and a highset timber and brick structure to the west. Block A is characteristic of Type F/T7. The structure is supported on tapered open web steel floor trusses, with a cantilever supported northern verandah, enabling unencumbered play space underneath. The stepped, gabled roofs are clad with terracotta tiles, with four modern (1993) roof vents visible from the south.

The double storey section to the east is constructed of face brick. Glass louvres and an area of brickwork (1973) enclose the toilets and store rooms to the ground floor. A small porch covers the ground floor entry to the north and a driveway passes through the building, with a former entrance passageway with timber bench seating on the west side. The first floor has an enclosed south verandah with narrow chamferboard cladding and fixed, timber-framed glazing, with steel framed glass louvres to the verandah wall. The first floor interior contains offices and workrooms divided by partition walls. A central staircase links the two halves of the building.

The west section comprises four classrooms on the first floor and an open play space beneath, with a brick-enclosed staircase at the far western end. Timber framed hopper windows, with fanlights, extend along the full length of the south elevation. The north-facing verandah is enclosed with fixed, timber framed glazing (1993), on enclosed bag racks. The verandah walls are lined with flat sheeting with cover-strips, with steel framed glass louvres above sill height. The classroom walls and raked ceiling are lined with flat sheeting with cover-strips. Folding timber doors survive in two partition walls. The understorey features open web steel floor trusses supported on concrete piers. An additional classroom is located to the east end of the understorey, enclosed by glass louvres to the north, face-brick with hopper windows to the south, and a solid brick wall to the west.

=== Setting and landscape features ===
The established grounds comprise lawn areas, garden beds and numerous mature plantings, as well as various built landscape features such as pathways, terraces and retaining walls; integrated with the concentration of school buildings to the north and surrounding the open playing fields to the south.

The front of the school is elevated and set back from Wynnum Road behind a fenced lawn and densely planted terraced garden beds. The axial siting of Block B is accentuated by the original (1915) concrete entrance pathway and stair layout from Wynnum Road. Mature trees including poincianas (Delonix regia) are integrated into the front garden, with wattle (Acacia pycnantha), figs (Ficus), and Moreton Bay ash (Corymbia tessellaris) scattered across the northwest corner of the site. Further mature plantings continue along the western boundary of the school including figs, eucalypts and various other species.

Areas of asphalt are located between the school buildings, including the parade ground (now covered with astro-turf) to the south of Block A which is surrounded by concrete block retaining walls. A mature mango (Mangifera indica) tree (associated with the early private residence) is located to the southwest of the parade ground. Several shade trees of various species, Moreton Bay ash, fig and camphor laurel (Cinnamomum camphora), form an avenue running south from Block A, in line with the driveway.

The rectangular swimming pool, opened 9 December 1922, to the south of Block E comprises an in-ground concrete shell and surface surround. A large modern amenity building has been constructed to the west end of the pool and concrete tennis and basketball courts are located to the east.

The site slopes downwards to the south and the level playing fields are surrounded by vegetated embankments. A retaining wall constructed of Brisbane tuff with later additions in granite, defines the east and north extents of the grassed playing field. Two large figs stand on the slope between the pool and the playing field. Various mature plantings including Paperbarks and a Mango tree are concentrated to the southeast corner of the site around the Pre-School Centre (location of the former Teacher's Residence) and along Molloy Road.

== Heritage listing ==
Cannon Hill State School was listed on the Queensland Heritage Register on 12 June 2015 having satisfied the following criteria.

The place is important in demonstrating the evolution or pattern of Queensland's history.

Cannon Hill State School (established in 1915) is important in demonstrating the evolution of state education and its associated architecture in Queensland. The place retains excellent and representative examples of standard government designs that were architectural responses to prevailing government educational philosophies.

The suburban timber school building (1915) represents the culmination of years of experimentation with light, classroom size and elevation, by the Department of Public Works. This was replicated in a similar building (1947) with modifications typical of its period.

The temporary classroom building (c. 1950-1) demonstrates a transitional period where standardised designs of conventional construction were combined with prefabricated systems to provide basic classroom accommodation in response to the increased post-war demand on schools.

Two highset timber school building extensions (1954, 1957) demonstrate new standard designs that evolved after World War II, incorporating concepts from prefabrication systems.

The timber-framed school building incorporating open web floor trusses (1959) demonstrates the change to steel truss supports and cantilevered verandahs to create uncluttered understorey play space.

The early swimming pool (1921) reflects the growing popularity of children learning to swim for health and safety reasons.

The large, suburban site with mature trees and landscaping features demonstrates the importance of play and aesthetics in the education of children.

The place is important in demonstrating the principal characteristics of a particular class of cultural places.

Cannon Hill School is important in demonstrating the principal characteristics of a suburban Queensland state school complex. These include: generous, landscaped sites with mature shade trees, assembly/play areas and sporting facilities; and a range of timber-framed teaching buildings constructed between 1915 and 1959. The large school complex retains good, representative examples of standard Queensland government designs that were architectural responses to the prevailing government educational philosophies, and non-standard features such as a swimming pool (1921).

The large suburban timber school building (Block B, 1915) is a good, intact example of its type, comprising: a symmetrical plan of three gable-roofed wings connected via continuous verandahs; highset timber-framed structure with play space beneath; projecting teachers rooms; verandah cloak rooms and hat hooks; and continuous operable vents at floor level.

An adjacent classroom building (Block F, 1947) is of similar design to the earlier suburban timber school building, comprising a rectangular plan with consistent classroom width, verandah layout and external details, but without the hinged ventilation boards.

The temporary classroom building (Block C, c. 1950-51) is a rare, intact example of its type, with lowset timber-framed structure, north facing verandah, vertical tongue-and-groove cladding and banks of casement windows with fanlights over.

Extensions to the east (Block F, 1957) and west (Block E, 1954) of Block F are good examples of highset timber school buildings, with external cladding carried through both levels, extensive use of hopper windows to southern elevation, and double-hung sash windows to the northern, verandah wall.

The timber-framed school building incorporating open web floor trusses (Block A, 1959) is a good, intact example of its type, combining face brick construction with a highset timber-framed structure supported on open web steel floor trusses, enabling unencumbered play space underneath.

The place is important because of its aesthetic significance.

Cannon Hill State School is of aesthetic significance for its picturesque architectural qualities and contribution to the streetscape. Highly-intact, the Suburban Timber School Building (Block B, 1915) has considerable architectural value as a building of high-quality materials and construction with well-composed features. The symmetrical front elevation, with projecting gabled wings, features decorative elements of finely-crafted timber work. The Suburban Timber School Building is prominently sited, elevated and set back from the road behind open grassed areas and landscaped gardens; it is an attractive feature along Wynnum Road and is a landmark for the area.

The place has a strong or special association with a particular community or cultural group for social, cultural or spiritual reasons.

Schools have always played an important part in Queensland communities. They typically retain significant and enduring connections with former pupils, parents, and teachers; provide a venue for social interaction and volunteer work; and are a source of pride, symbolising local progress and aspirations. Cannon Hill State School has a strong and ongoing association with the Cannon Hill community. It was established in 1915 through the fundraising efforts of the local community and generations of children have been taught there. The place is important for its contribution to the educational development of Cannon Hill and is a prominent community focal point and gathering place for social and commemorative events with widespread community support.

== See also ==
- History of state education in Queensland
- List of schools in Greater Brisbane
