= Berserker Range =

Mountain range in Australia

Berserker

Highest point
- Peak: Mount Archer
- Elevation: 604 m (1,982 ft)

Geography
- Country: Australia
- State: Queensland
- Region: Central Queensland
- Range coordinates: 23°19′S 150°36′E

Geology
- Rock age: Permian

The Berserker Range is a mountainous region located on the eastern and northeastern boundary of the city of Rockhampton in Central Queensland, Australia. Within it lies Mount Archer National Park. It has been designated the Berserker Range Environmental Protection Area by the Rockhampton Regional Council. The southernmost part of the range reaches the Fitzroy River at Broadmount, east of Rockhampton.

== Geology ==
The range is composed of a diverse group of mostly igneous rocks dating from the Devonian to Early Triassic Periods. It has its origins in the Early Permian period around 275 million years ago, when the original segment of continental crust stretched and subsequently sagged, leading to the development of two faults and subsequent volcanic activity. Much of the rocky outcrops and peaks of elevated areas are composed of masses of rhyolite and dacite and known as Elliott Rhyolite. These masses then erode, with the deposits forming a dark grey material known as Sleipner Member. Not all the elevated areas are rhyolite; Mount Dick and Mount MacDonald, are mainly composed of breccia.

== History ==
Historically, the region was home to the Raki-warra clan of the local Darumbal indigenous people.

It was named by Rockhampton pioneer pastoralist Charles Archer after the Norse warrior "Baresark", who fought without armour in the Norwegian sagas. Although born in Scotland, the Archer family lived for many years in Larvik, Norway and members of the family moved between Queensland and Norway throughout their lives.

A small amount of gold mining took place in the 19th century, and grazing leases were issued in 1900. The area was declared a timber reserve in 1940 and logged, with ironbark, white mahogany and lemon-scented gum being the main trees harvested. Grazing ended in 1974 with the conclusion of the last lease, and logging ceased in 1985.

== See also ==
- List of mountains in Australia
