= Wattle Day =

Australian celebration of the first day of spring

National Wattle Day
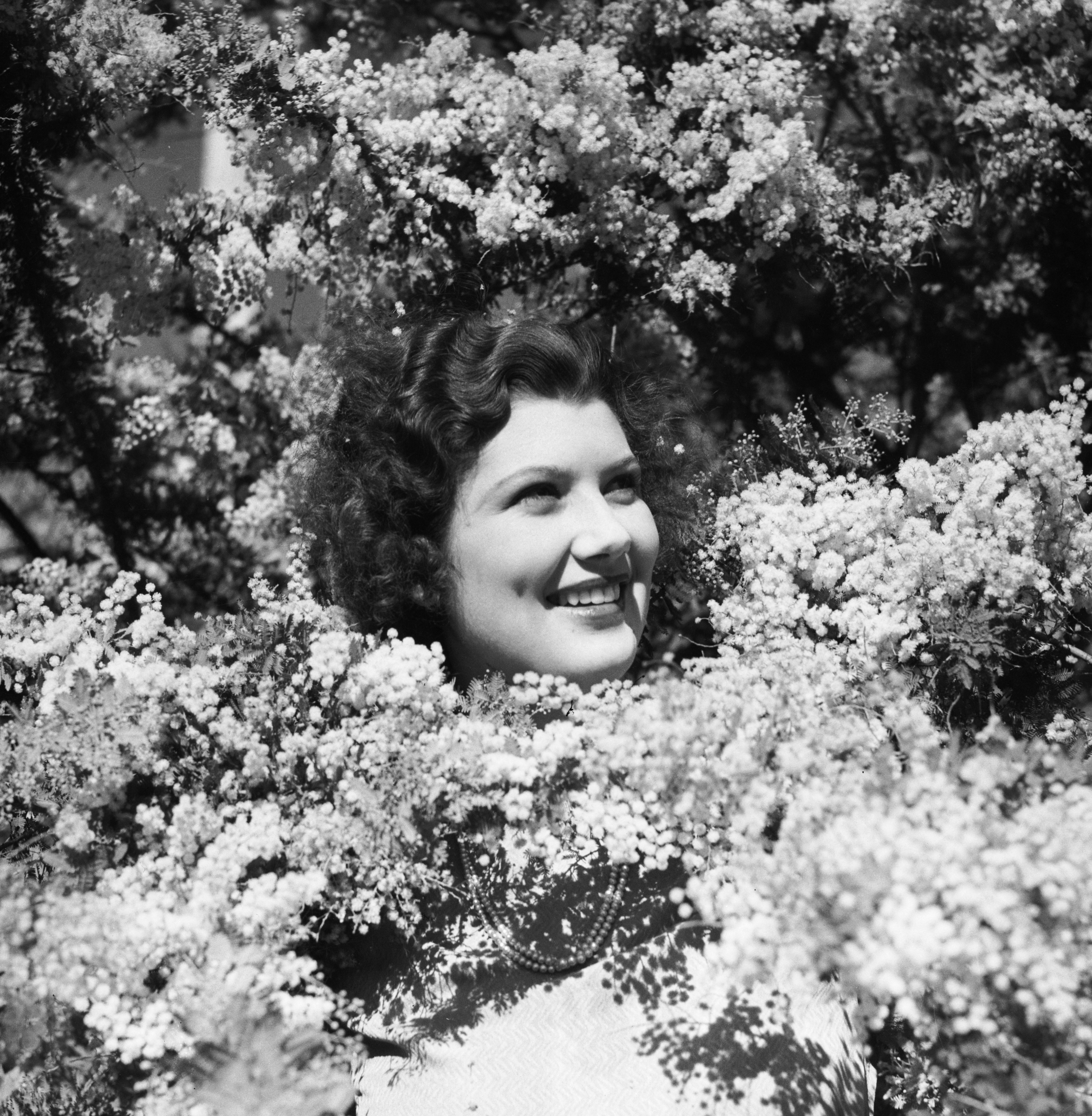
- Woman with wattles, Sydney, 1938
- Official name: National Wattle Day
- Also called: Wattle Day
- Type: Federal
- Date: 1 September
- Frequency: Annual
- First time: 1992; 33 years ago

Wattle Day is a day of celebration in Australia on the first day of September each year, which is the start of the Australian spring.

== Background ==
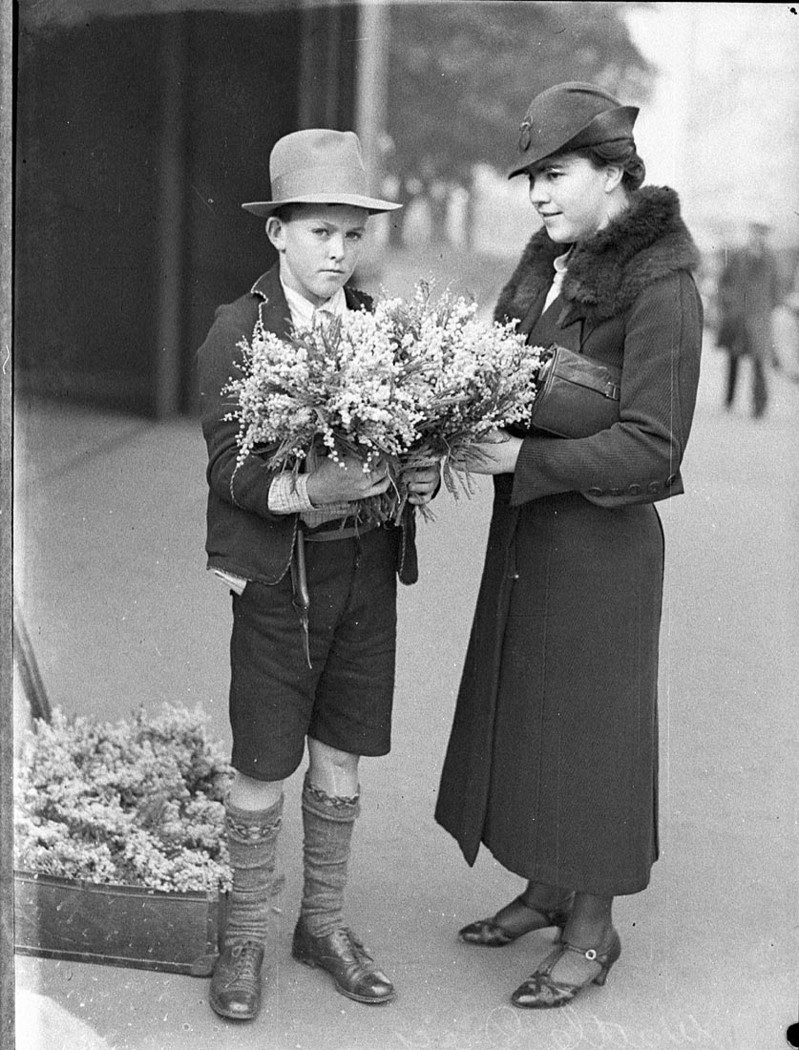
Woman buying wattle for Wattle Day, Sydney, 1935

National Wattle Day is the time when many Acacia species (commonly called wattles in Australia), are in flower. So, people wear a sprig of the flowers and leaves to celebrate the day.

Although the national floral emblem of Australia is a particular species, named the golden wattle (Acacia pycnantha), any acacia can be worn to celebrate the day.

The day was originally intended to promote patriotism for the new nation of Australia:

"Wattle Days emerged to prominence in Australia in the early years of the federated nation. They took on some of the national and civic responsibilities for children that [the more formal] Australia Day could not." - Libby Robin

== Tasmanian origin, 1838 ==
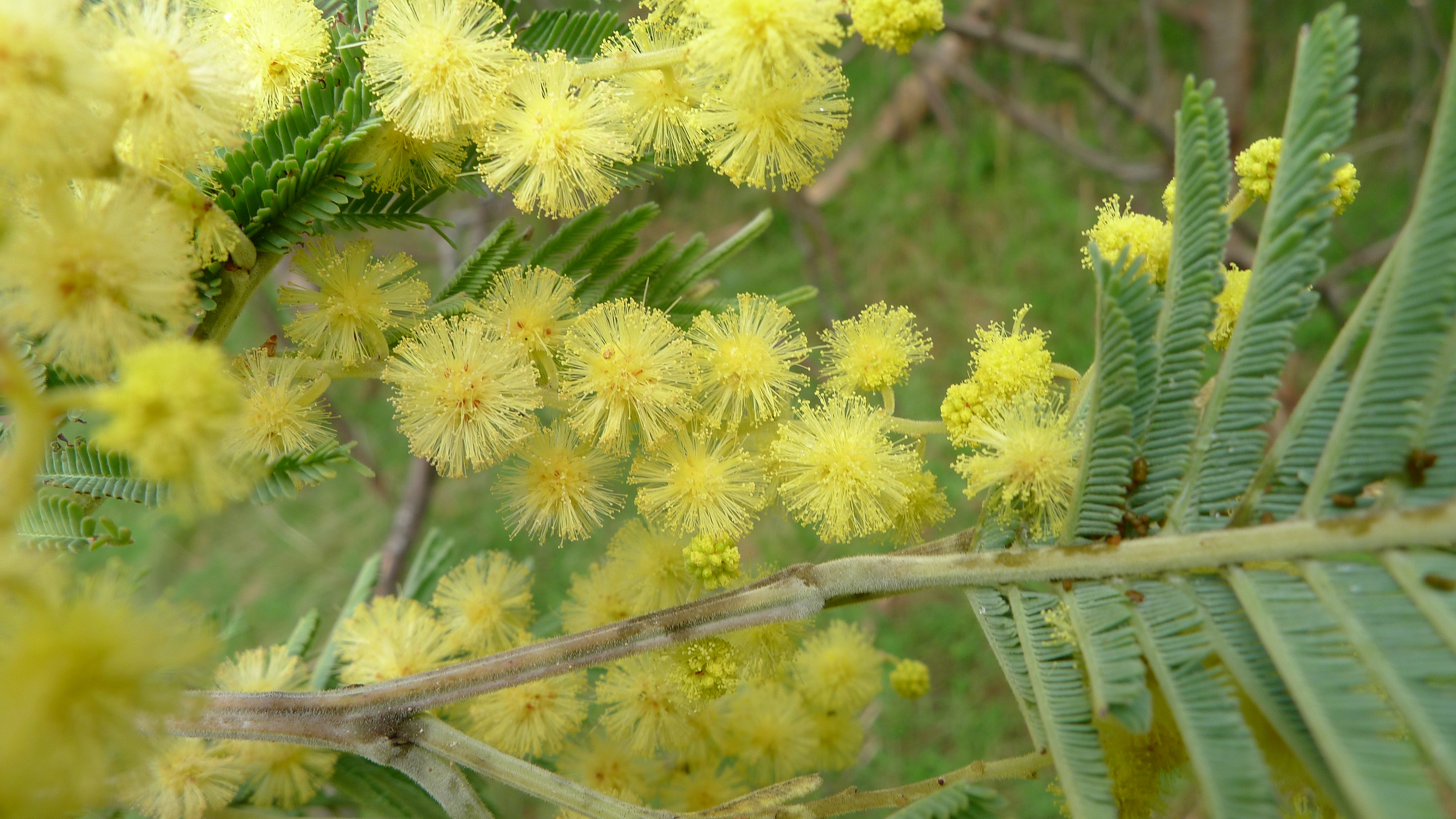
Black wattle, Acacia mearnsii

On 1 December 1838, the first Hobart Town Anniversary Regatta was held in Hobart, Tasmania to celebrate the anniversary of the 17th-century European discovery of the island by Dutch explorer Abel Tasman, who made the first reported European sighting of the island on 24 November 1642. It was estimated between 5000 and 6000 people attended. On 10 August 1853 in Launceston, during "Cessation of Transportation Celebrations" the procession marched under a triumphal arch decorated with wattle blossom.

It was suggested that for future regattas, the event should be celebrated by the wearing of a sprig of silver wattle blossom (Acacia dealbata) tied with British Navy blue ribbon. The proposal attracted some ridicule as the silver wattle blooms in August and September and would be unobtainable in November. As a result, the November-flowering black wattle (Acacia mearnsii) was substituted for the regatta. The custom of wearing a sprig of wattle at the regatta persisted until at least 1883.

The theme of wattle in literature, poetry and song took off from the 1860s to the early 1900s. When Adam Lindsay Gordon died in 1870 he was buried "where the wattle blossoms wave" - a quotation from his poem "The sick Stockrider". There were wattle waltzes and you could drink Foster's Wattle beer.

A "Wattle Blossom League" was inaugurated by W. J. Sowden and the South Australian chapter of the Australian Natives' Association in 1890 as a women's branch of the Association. The aim of the Wattle Blossom League was to "encourage Australian literature and music". Members should "at all suitable public assemblies wear a spray of wattle blossom either real or artificial, as a distinctive badge". Another aim of the league was "to promote a national patriotic sentiment among the women of Australia". The last monthly meeting of the Wattle Blossom League was held at Beach's Rooms on 1 June 1893.

== The Wattle Club, 1899 ==
The push for the recognition of the nationwide use of wattle as a symbol of the first day of spring was given momentum by the formation in 1899 of the "Wattle Club" in Victoria. It was initiated by Archibald James Campbell, a leading ornithologist and field naturalist with a particular passion for Australian wattles, of which there are more than 1,000 species. For several years the club organised bush outings on the first day in September specifically for the appreciation of wattles in their natural setting. Campbell was an active member of the Field Naturalists Club of Victoria. Their 1904 outing went to the You Yangs and in 1906 they went to the Werribee Gorge.

== Wattle Day League, 1909 ==
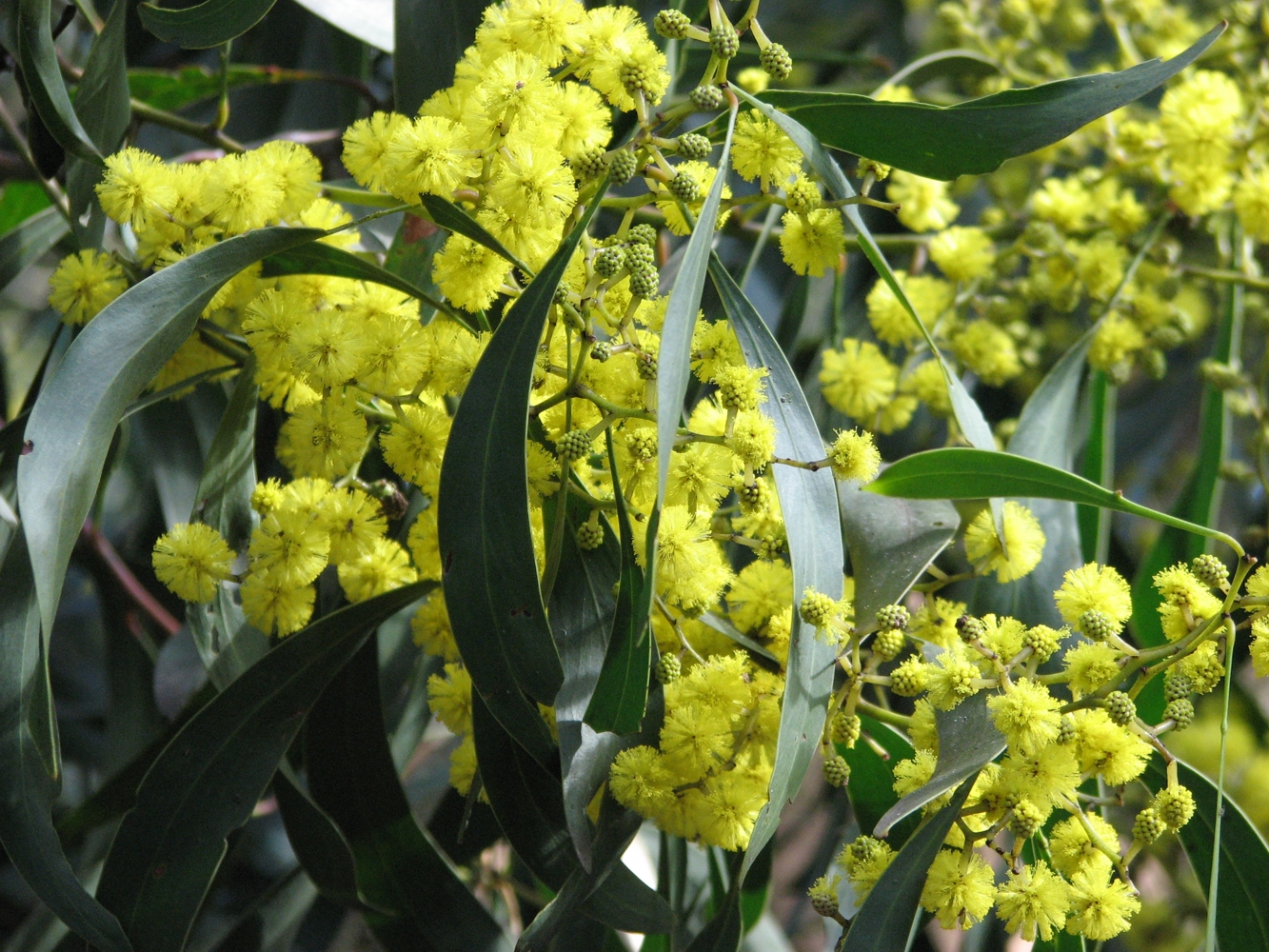
Golden wattle, Acacia pycnantha

The first suggestion of a dedicated Wattle Day was made by Campbell during a speech in September 1908.

The Wattle Day League was formed on 13 September 1909 at the Elizabeth Street, Sydney headquarters of the Royal Society, with J. H. Maiden, director of the Sydney Botanic Gardens as president. Its purpose was to present to the various state governments a unified proposal for a national day on which to celebrate the wattle blossom.

In 1910 the League settled on "Wattle Day" as 1 September, and approached Sowden to form a branch of the League in South Australia. Campbell and A. K. Warner founded a branch in Melbourne.

It was taken up, and there were celebrations in 1910 in three state capital cities: Sydney, Melbourne and Adelaide, although the Melbourne event was a muted affair due to heavy rain. The day was significant in being the first organised demonstration on a definite day across a number of states ever witnessed in Australia. On 1 September 1911 Adelaide was described as a city "decked with gold". In 1913, the national Wattle Day League (or Federation) was established to formalise the organisation of events for the celebration of Wattle Day.

Queensland followed in 1913. Sydney celebrated that year by planting 200 wattle trees in Centennial Park.

Australian coat of arms with the golden wattle design, 1921

The golden wattle was incorporated as an accessory in the design of the coat of arms of Australia in 1912.

Following the outbreak of World War 1 all attempts to gazette the emblem or Wattle Day were put aside.

There was some confusion in New South Wales over the date. In 1916, NSW changed its date for Wattle Day to 1 August, so that the indigenous, early-flowering Cootamundra wattle (Acacia baileyana) could be used. The Cootamundra wattle was planted all over Sydney and when the Red Cross called for sprigs of wattle to sell in Martin Place for the war effort, this species had mostly finished flowering. The League was granted a temporary change. Schools in NSW continued to use 1 August as the date for Wattle Day and there was some resistance to 1 September despite the association with spring. That resistance now appears to have almost disappeared.

Among other poetry, Scottish-Australian poet and bush balladeer William Henry Ogilvie wrote "Sunny country", which was often recited on past Wattle Days:

I dreamed of a sunny country last night, a golden dream
Of wattles down the gully, and of gum trees by the stream;
Of dancing haze and sides of blue, no other land can show
Save this, our sunny country, where the golden wattles grow.

== Australian bicentennial celebration, 1988 ==
On 19 August 1988, as part of events to mark the 200th anniversary of the arrival of First Fleet in Sydney in 1788, the golden wattle (Acacia pycnantha) was officially proclaimed as Australia's national floral emblem by the Governor-General of Australia, Sir Ninian Stephen. A formal ceremony was held in the National Botanic Gardens on 1 September, at which Maria Hitchcock was a guest of the government. Specimens of Acacia pycnantha were planted near the entry.

== National Wattle Day, 1992 ==
In 1986 Maria Hitchcock of Armidale NSW began a campaign to have both gazetted. With the aid of ABC's Ian McNamara, whose Sunday morning national program Australia All Over focuses on all things Australian, the message went out resulting in hundreds of letters of support being sent to the prime minister. The campaign was not progressing until Hitchcock met with Senator Graham Richardson at a Labor Party event in Armidale. Soon after the decision was made to gazette the emblem at a special ceremony in Canberra at the Australian National Botanic Gardens on 1 September. At that ceremony Hitchcock was told by Senator Ray that she would have to personally gain letters of approval for the gazettal of National Wattle Day from each premier and chief minister. Once again enlisting the aid of McNamara and his listeners, a new campaign of letter writing began. It took three years but the goal was finally achieved. Hitchcock bundled all the letters together and sent them to Canberra requesting gazettal of National Wattle Day for 1 September each year.

On 23 June 1992, Governor-General Bill Hayden declared that "1 September in each year shall be observed as 'National Wattle Day' throughout Australia and in the external Territories of Australia". In 1998, the Wattle Day Association was established to promote National Wattle Day.

2010 marked the centenary of the celebration of Wattle Day on 1 September 1910 in NSW, Victoria and South Australia, and Australian Geographic magazine was amongst those who urged the public not to miss the chance to celebrate it again.

== Recent developments ==
With the controversy over 26 January as Australia Day, in light of the historic treatment of Indigenous people, some Australians have been proposing Wattle Day as an alternative for national celebrations.

== Some popular wattles ==
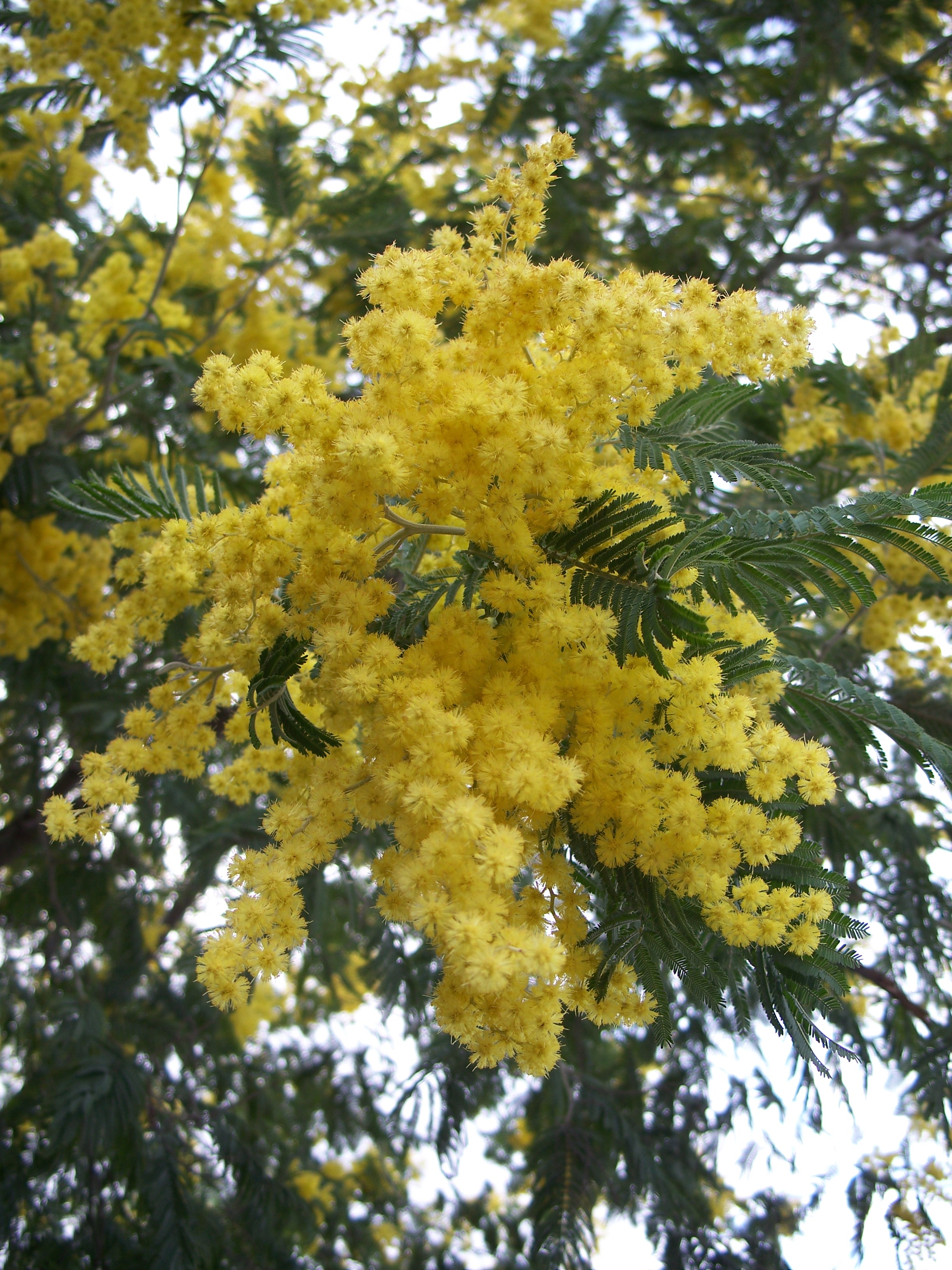
Silver wattle (Acacia dealbata)

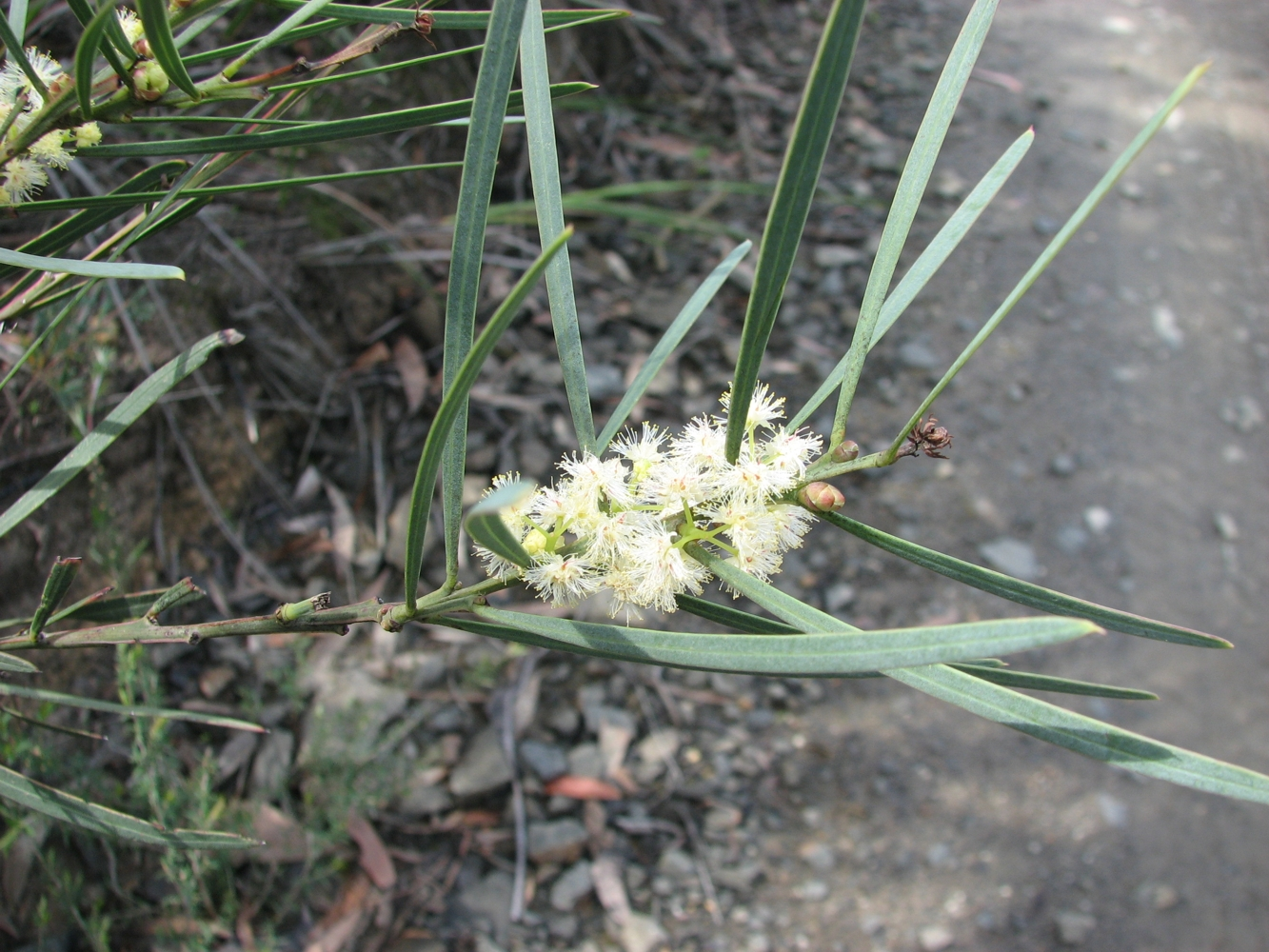
Sweet wattle or sweet-scented wattle (Acacia suaveolens)

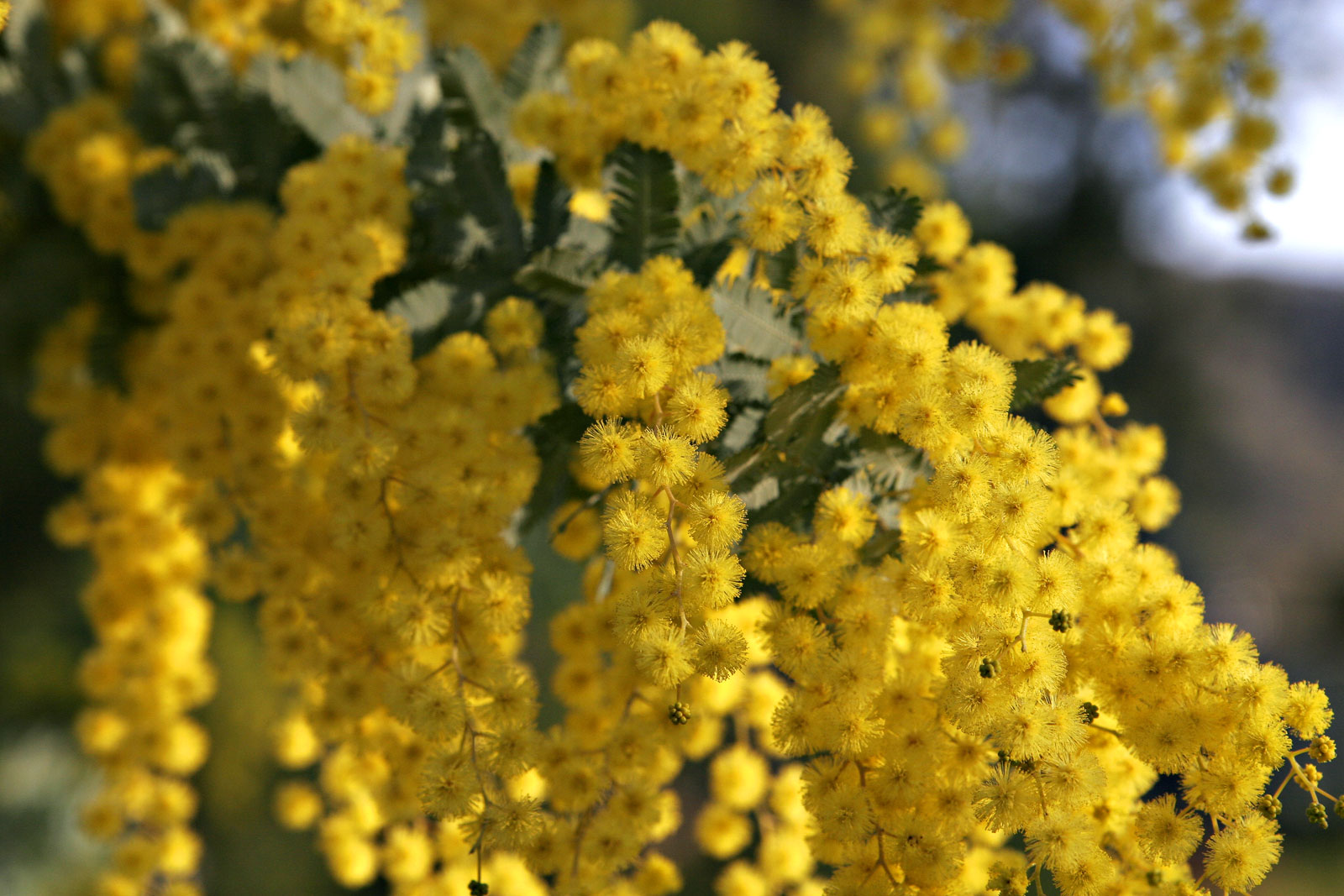
Cootamundra wattle (Acacia baileyana)

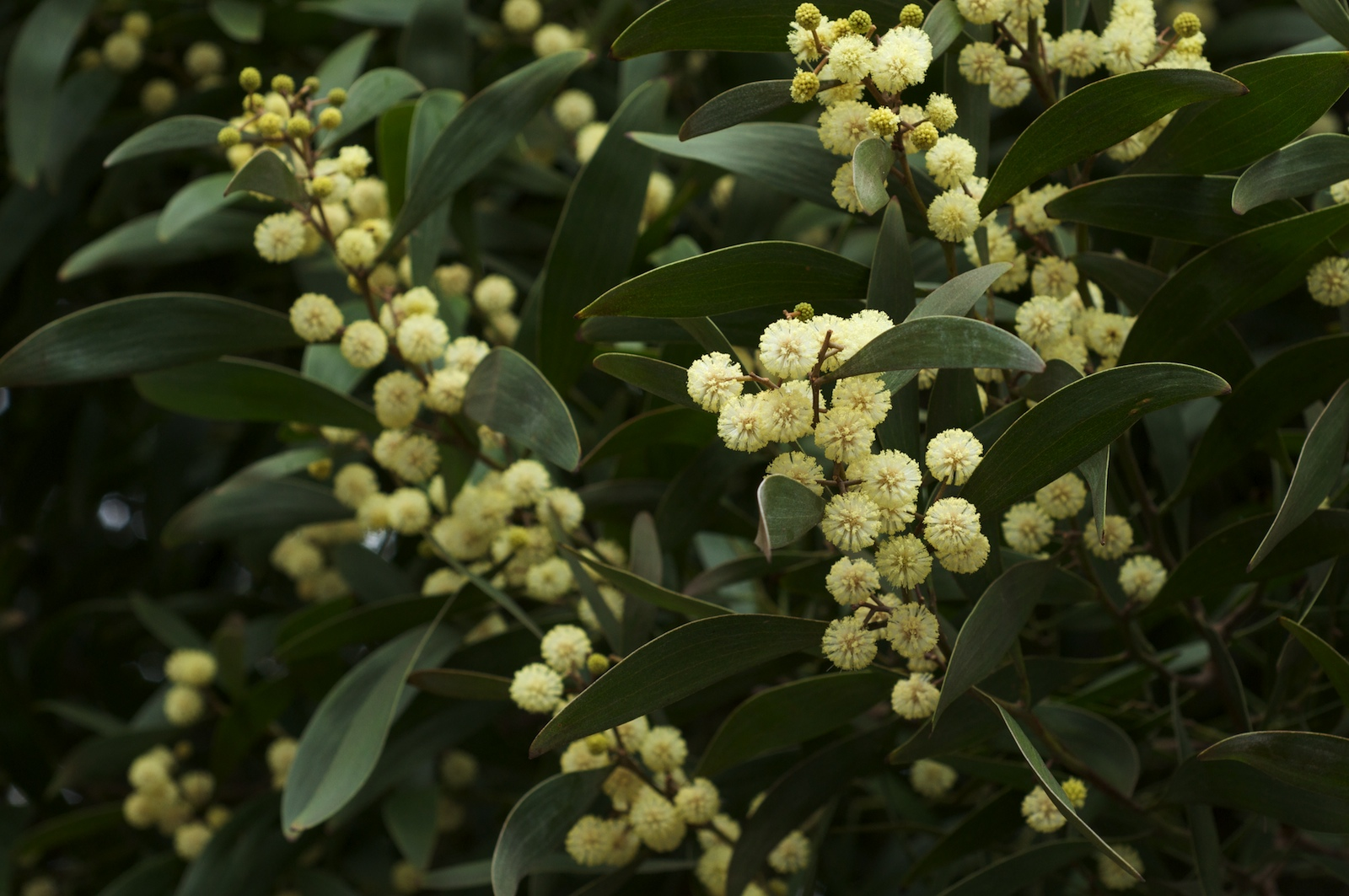
Blackwood (Acacia melanoxylon)

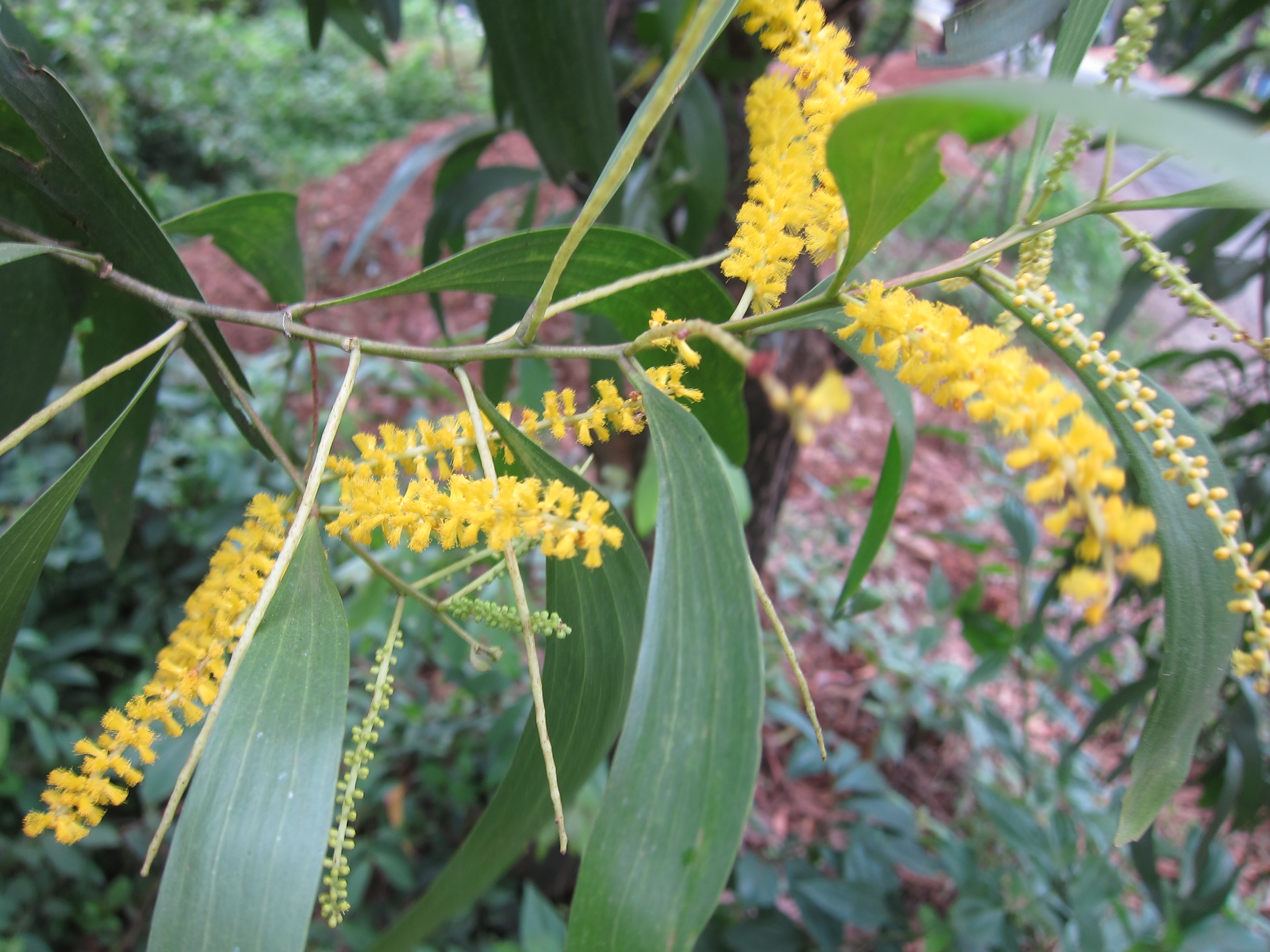
[Tropical] black wattle (Acacia auriculiformis)

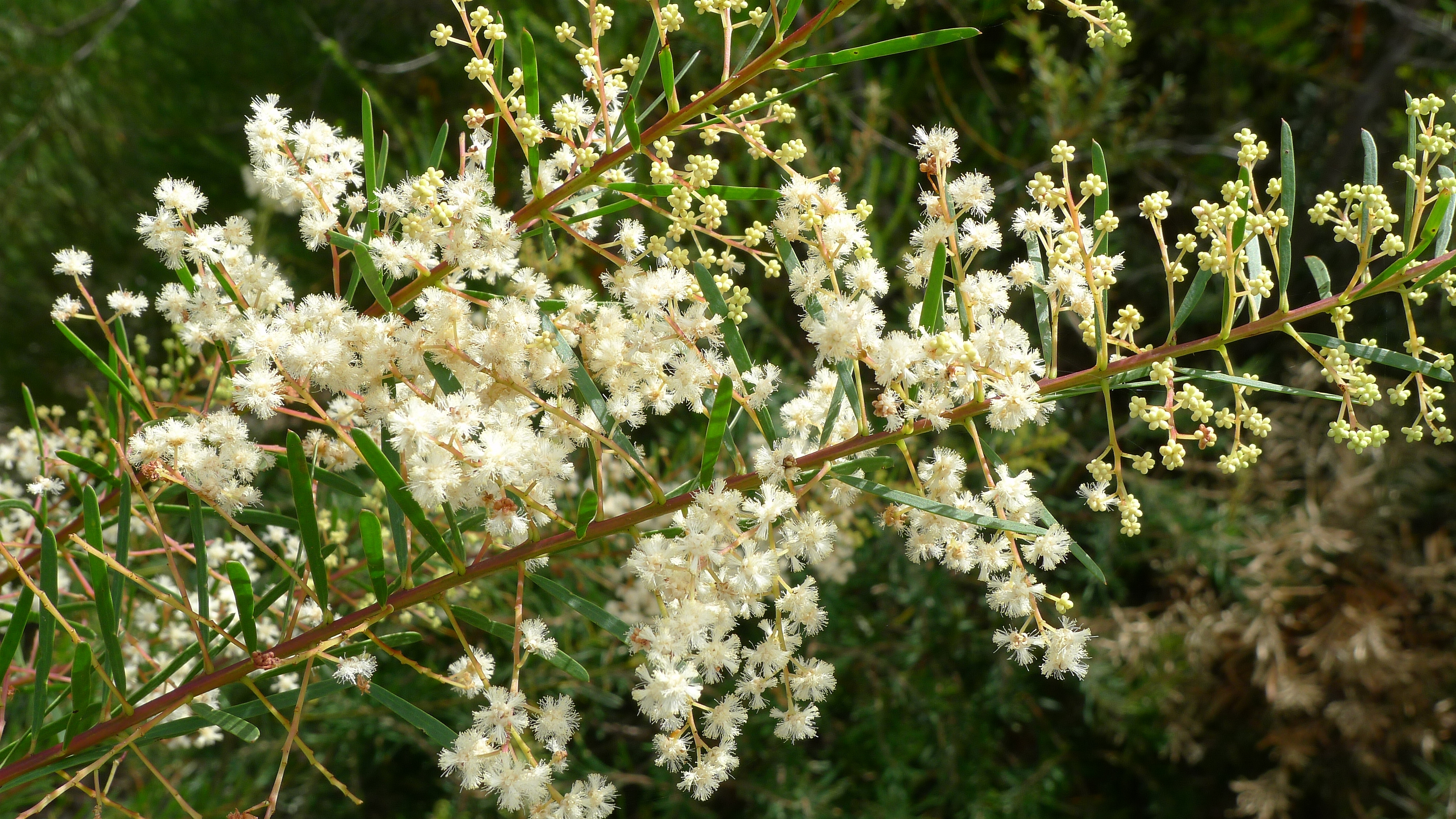
Flax wattle (Acacia linifolia)

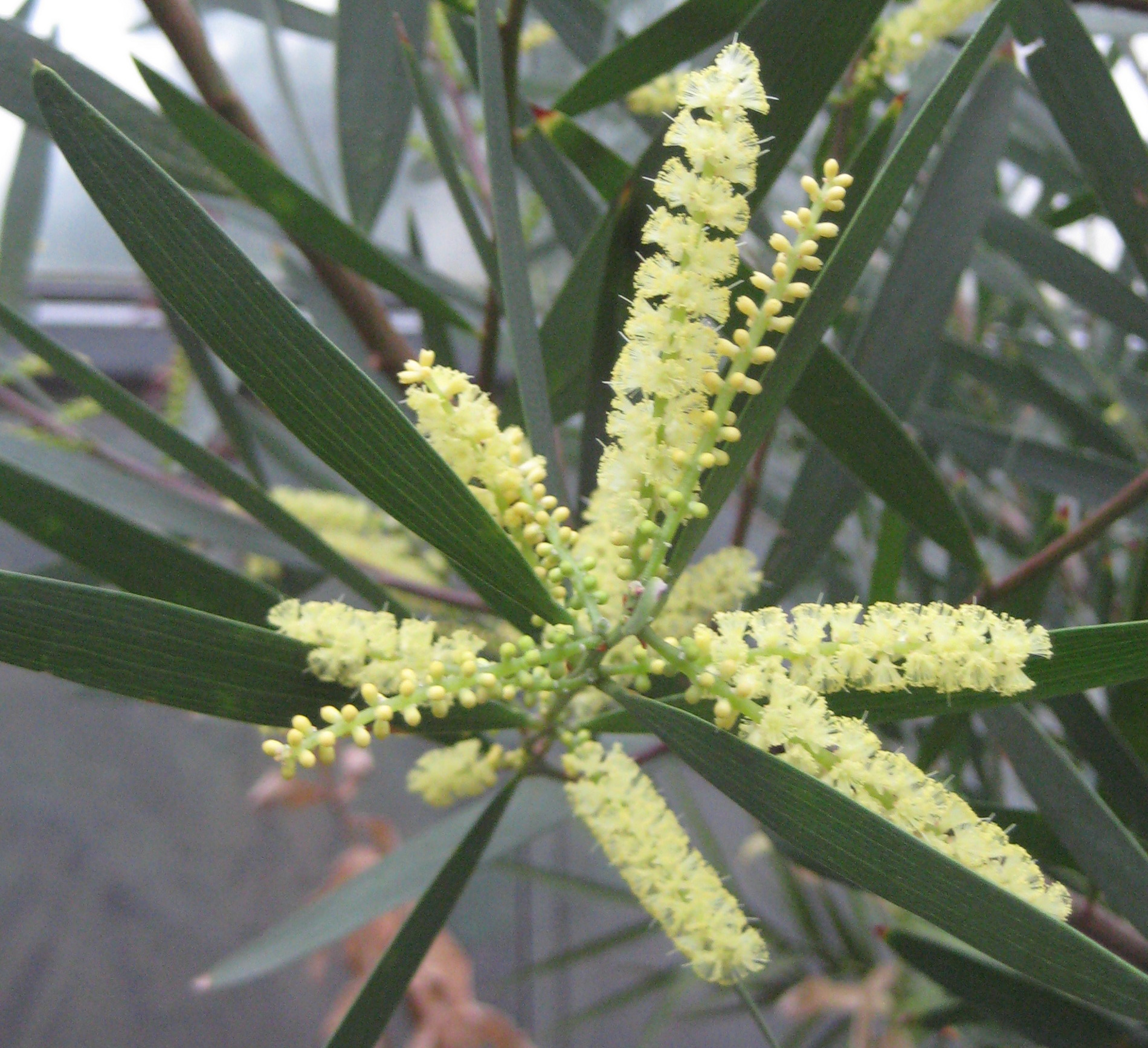
Sydney golden wattle (Acacia longifolia)

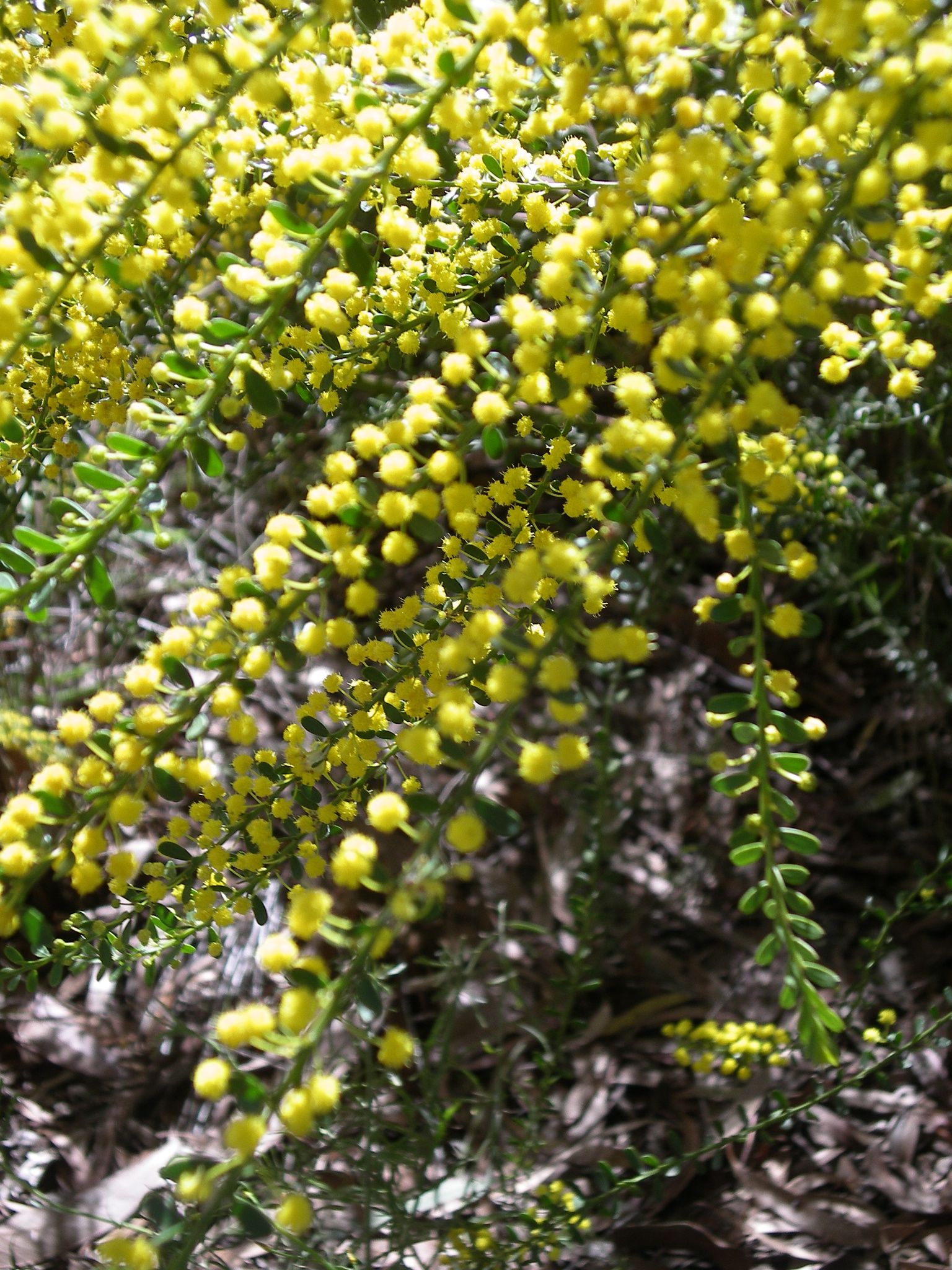
Gold dust wattle (Acacia acinacea)

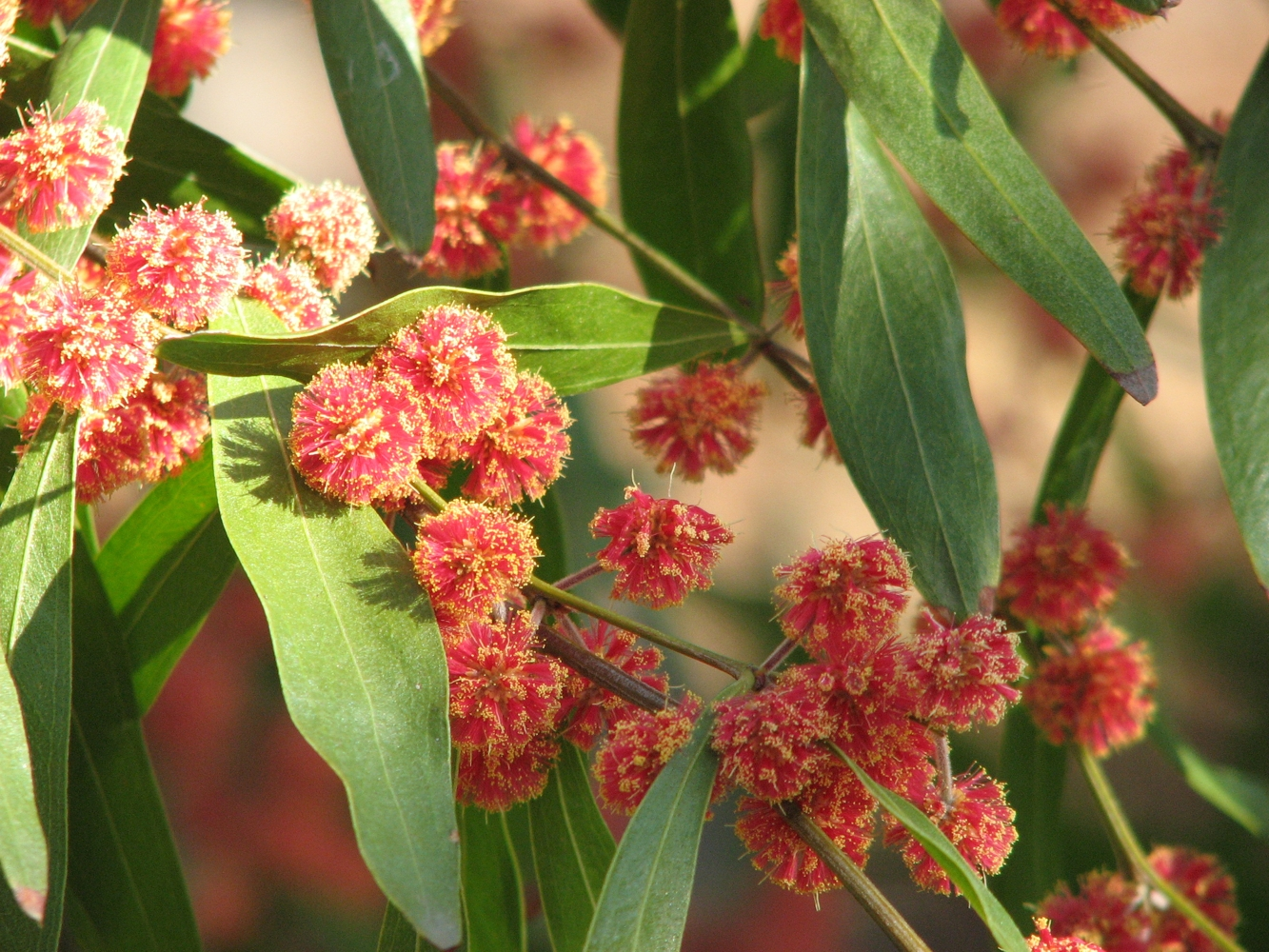
Scarlet Blaze (Acacia leprosa)

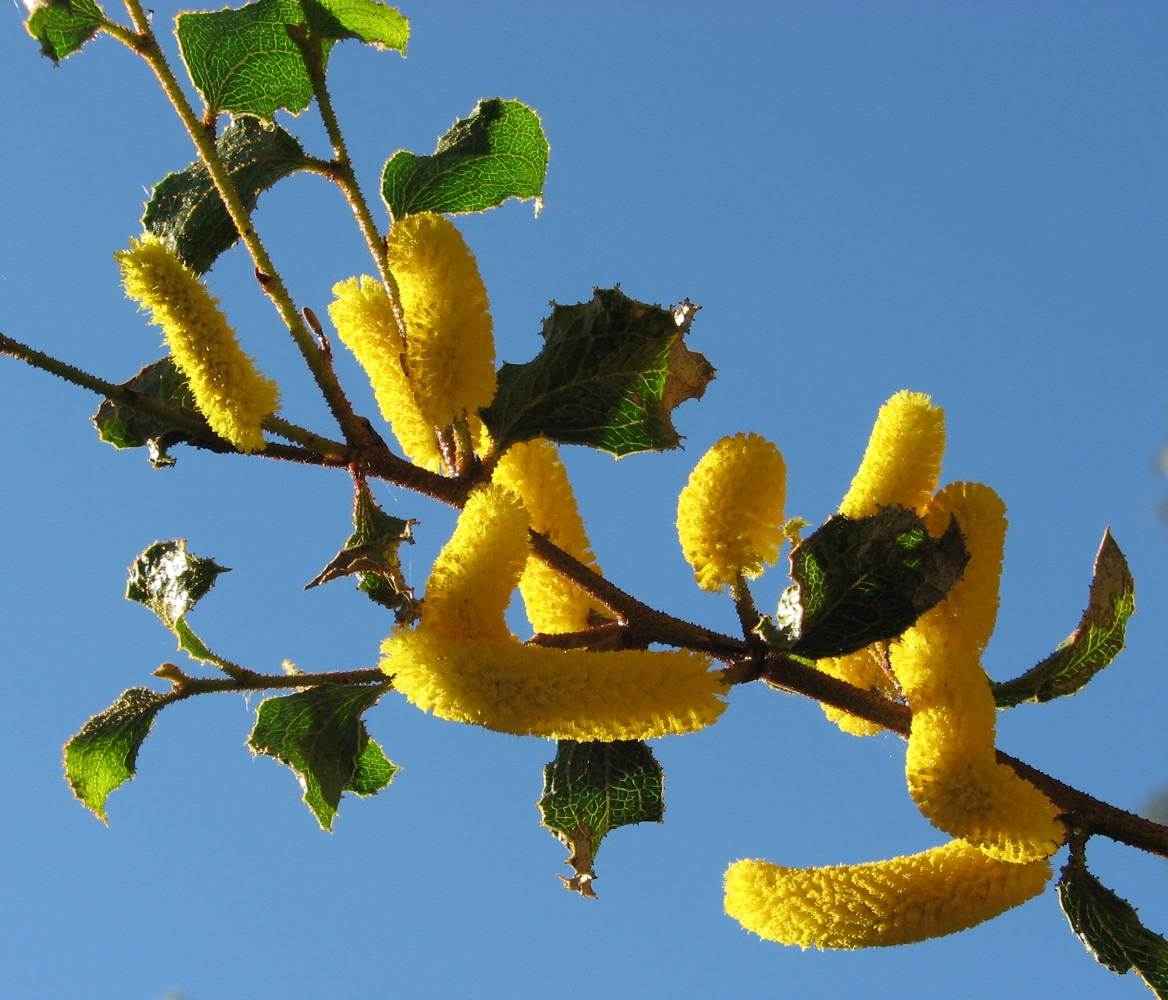
Sandpaper wattle (Acacia denticulosa)

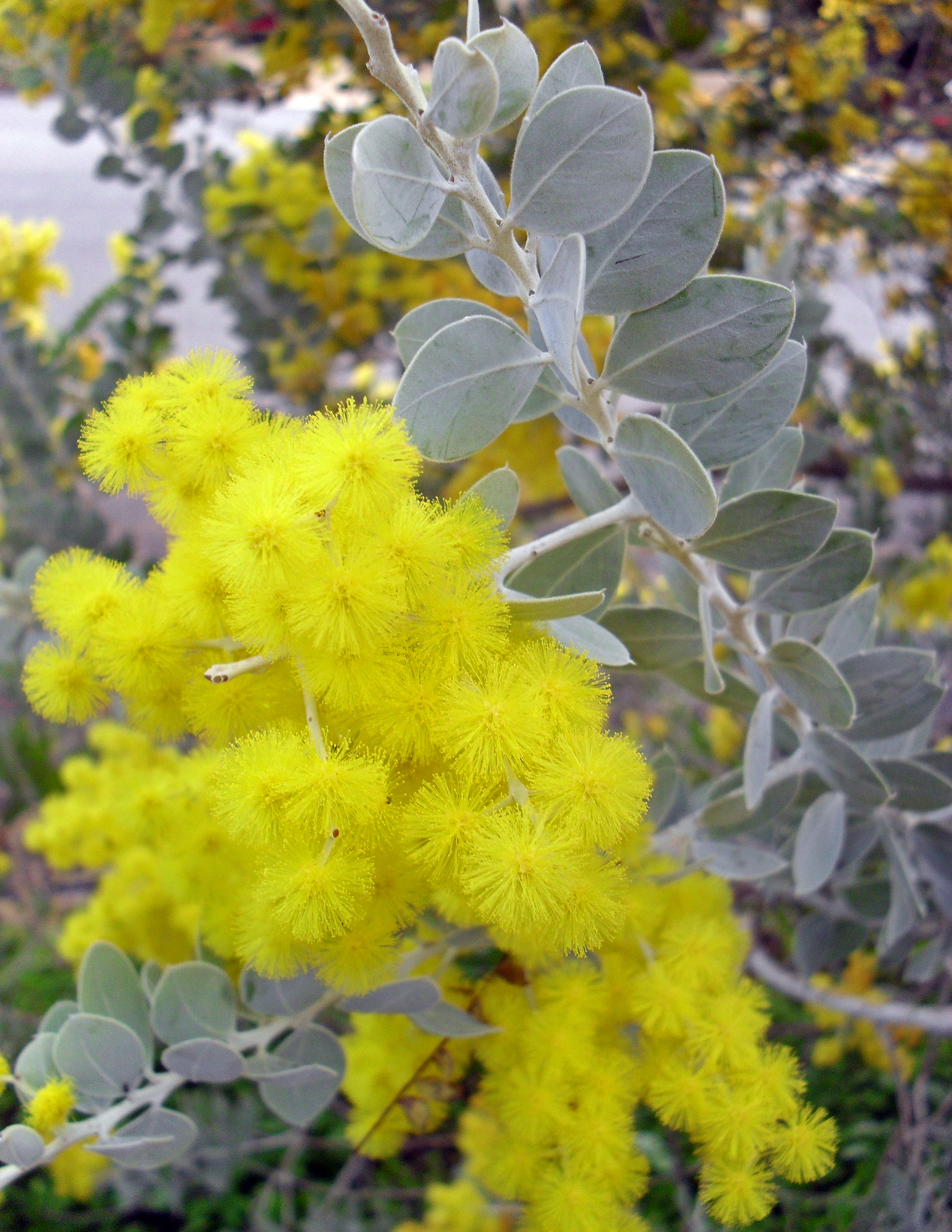
Queensland silver wattle (Acacia podalyriifolia)

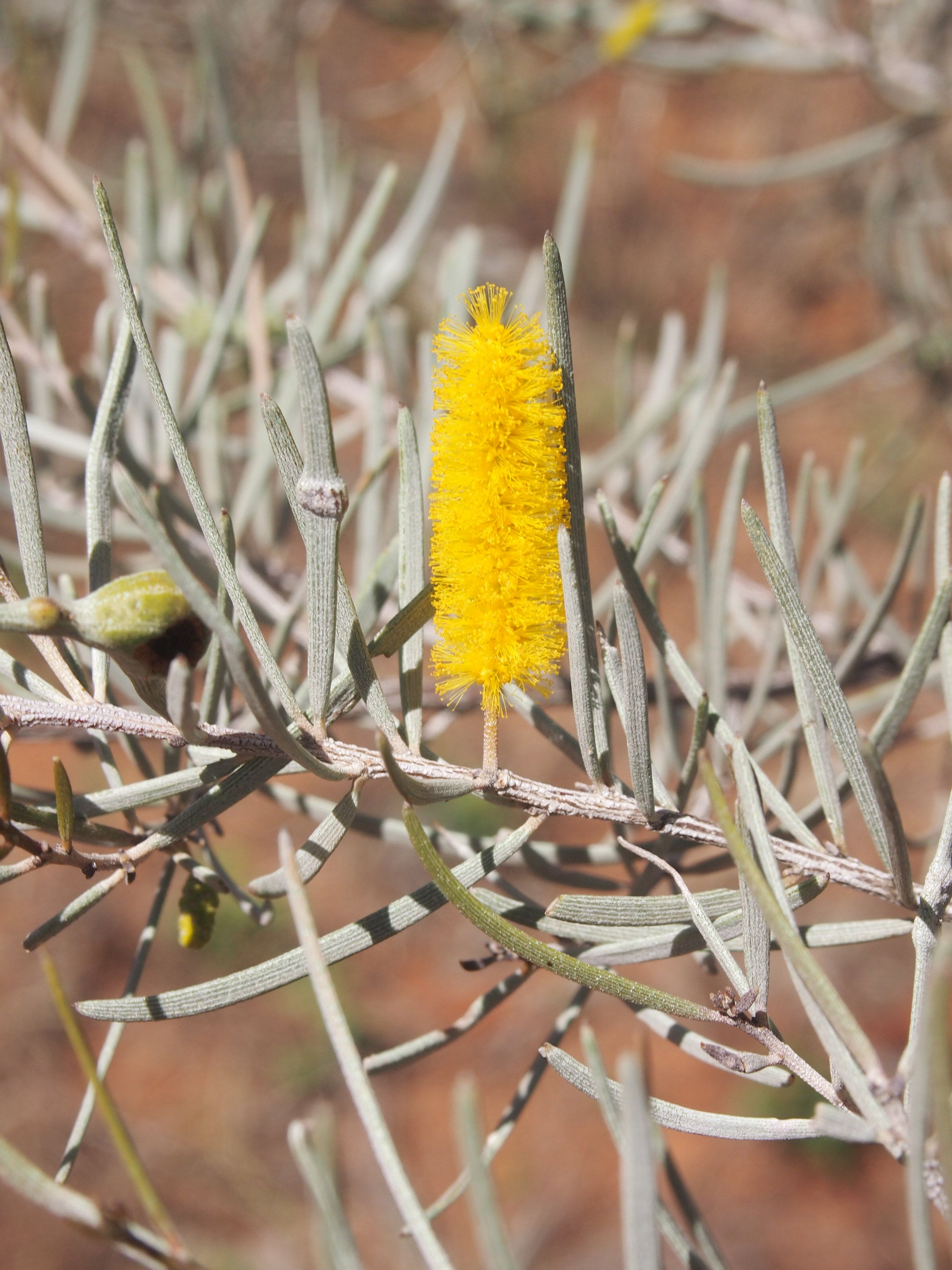
Mulga (Acacia aneura)

== Australian state floral emblems ==
The golden wattle is Australia's national floral emblem, but in addition each Australian state has its own floral emblem.

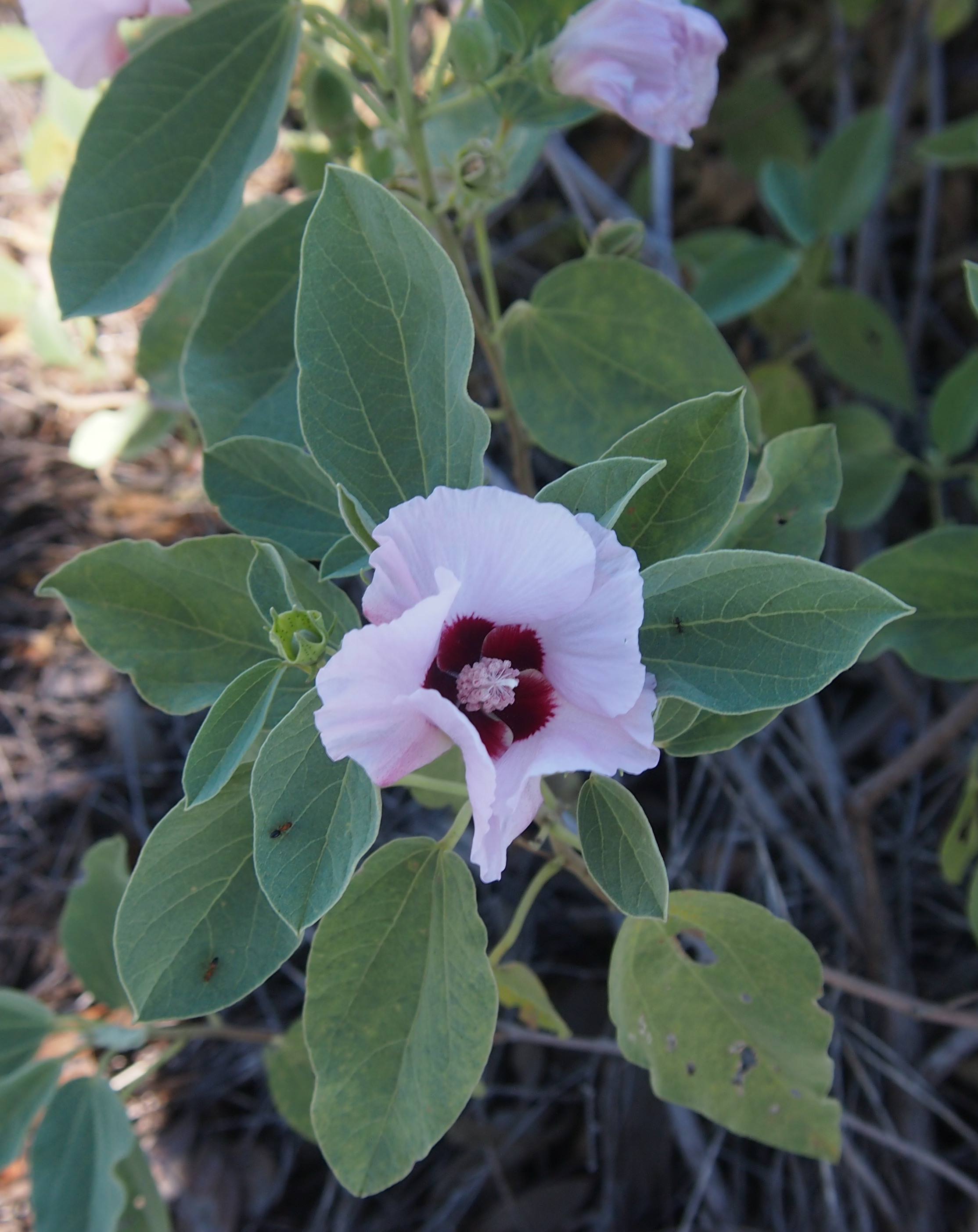
Northern Territory: Sturt's desert rose

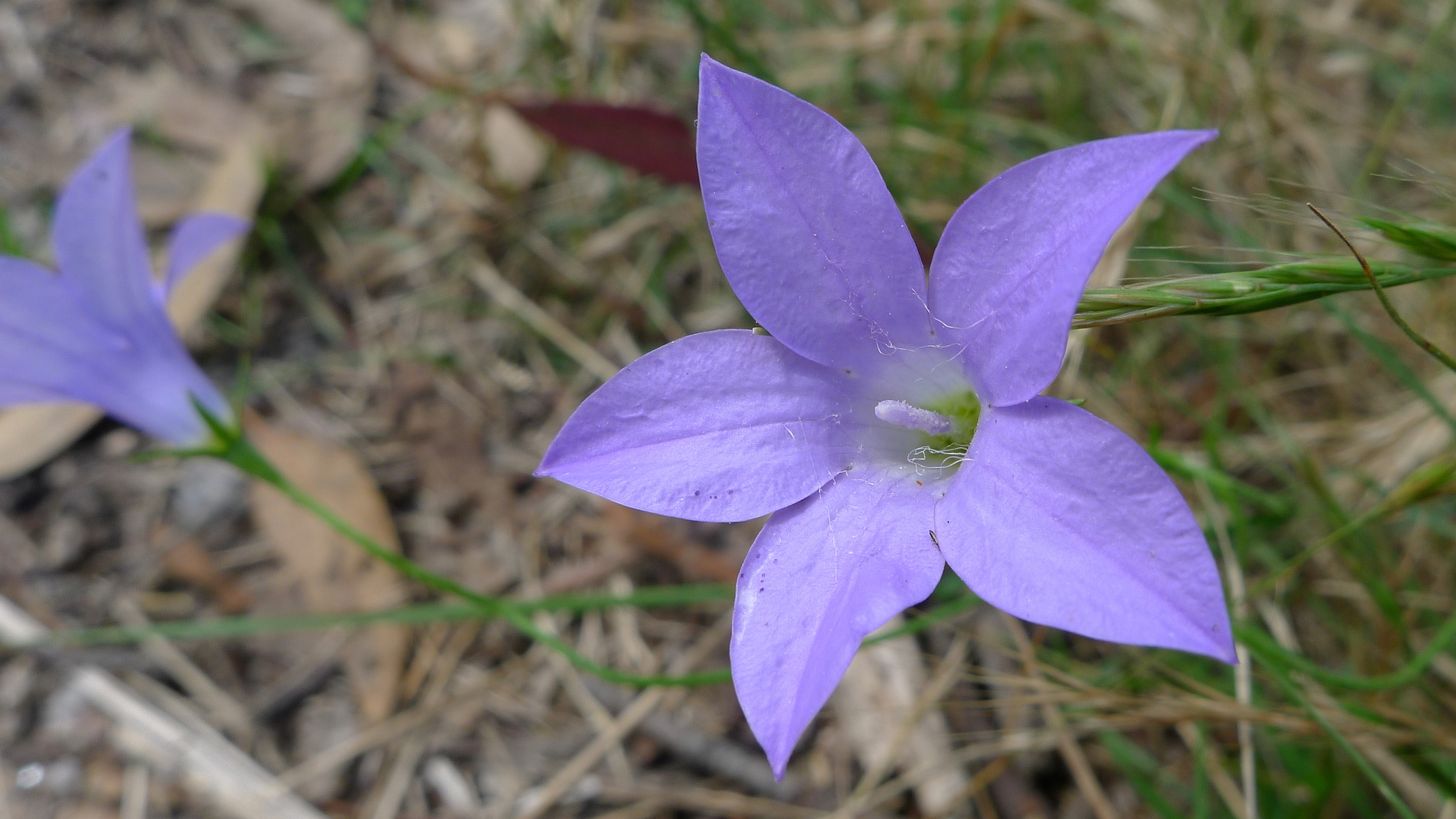
Australian Capital Territory Royal bluebell

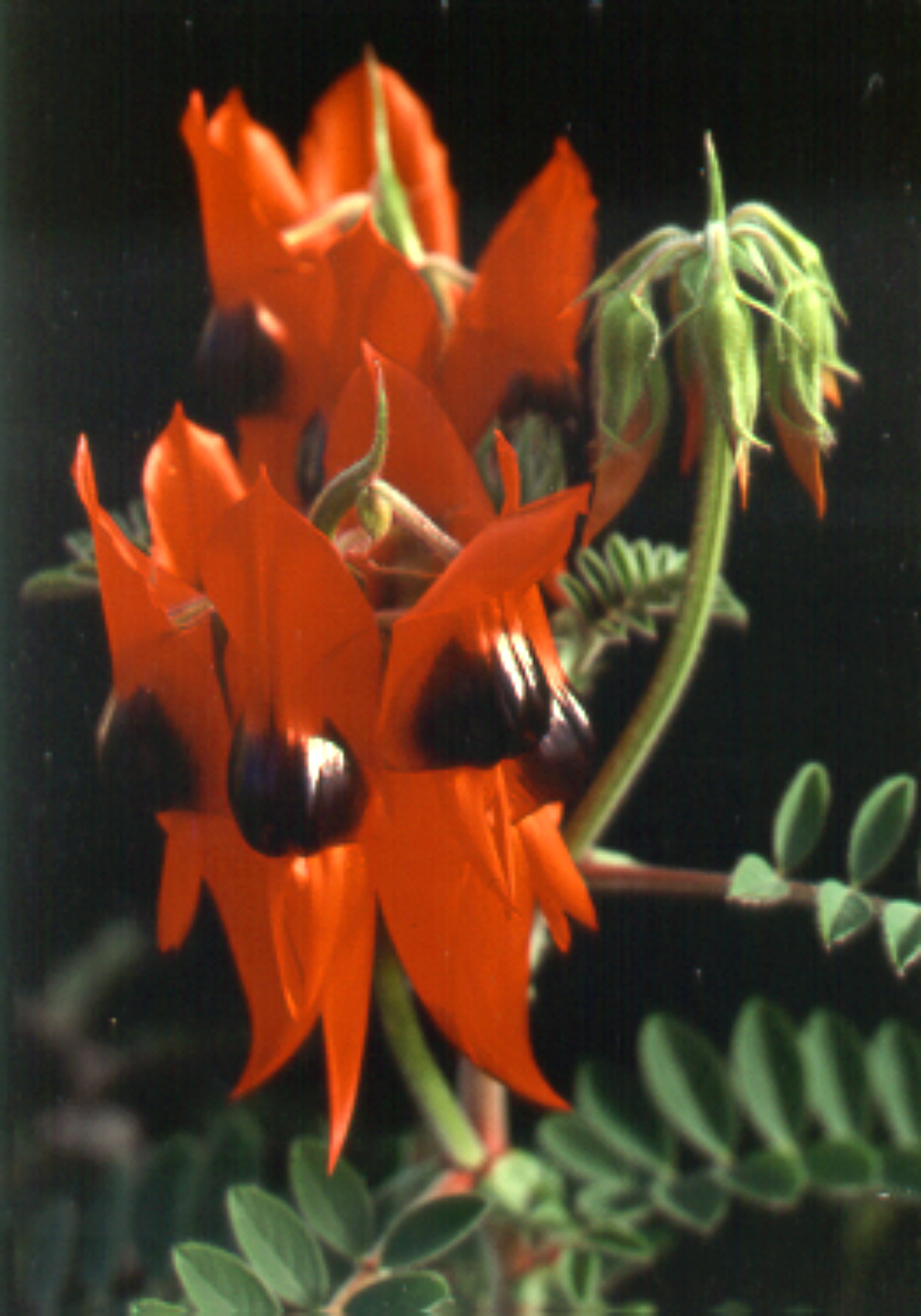
South Australia: Sturt's desert pea

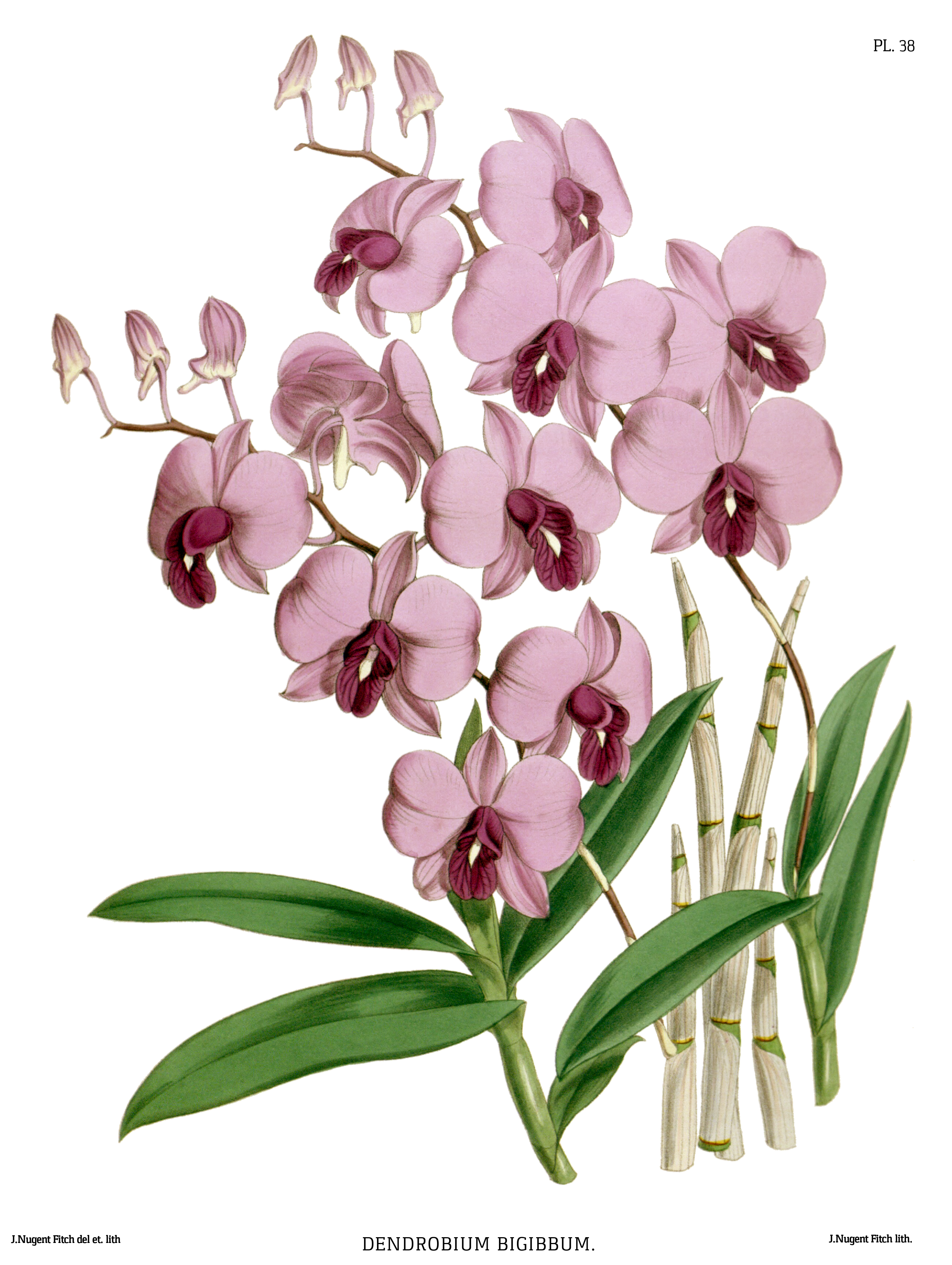
Queensland: Cooktown orchid

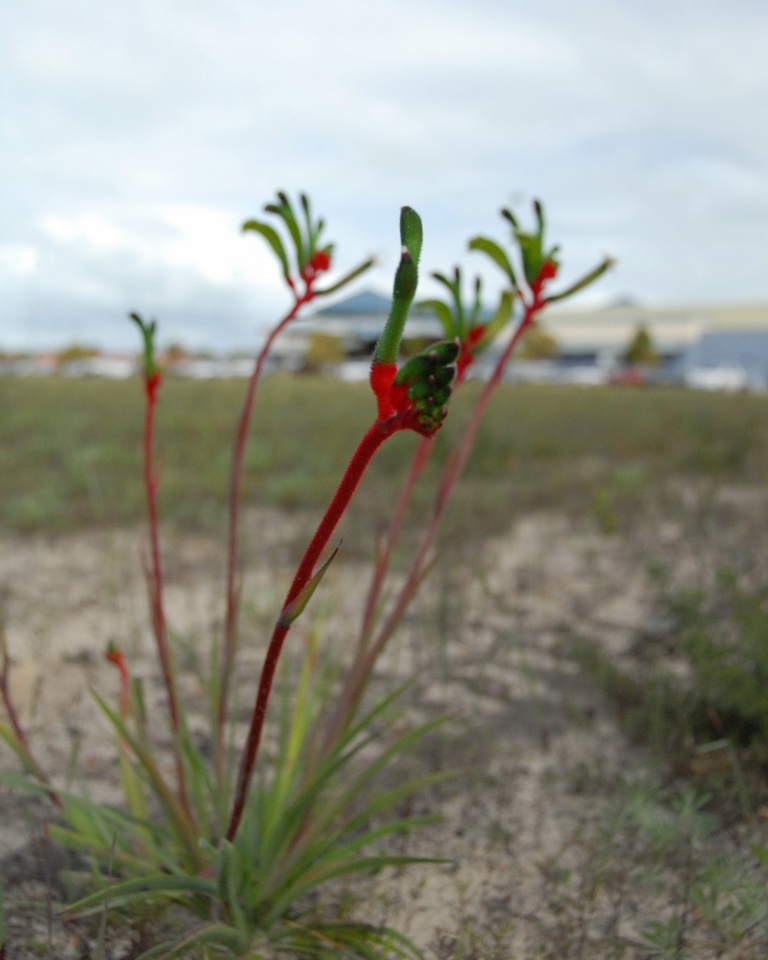
Western Australia: red and green kangaroo paw

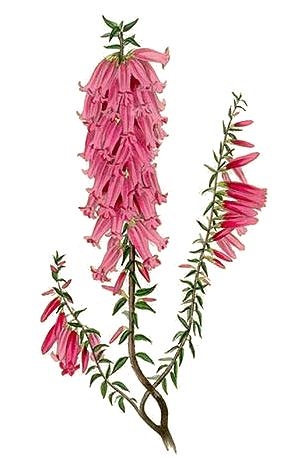
Victoria: pink heath

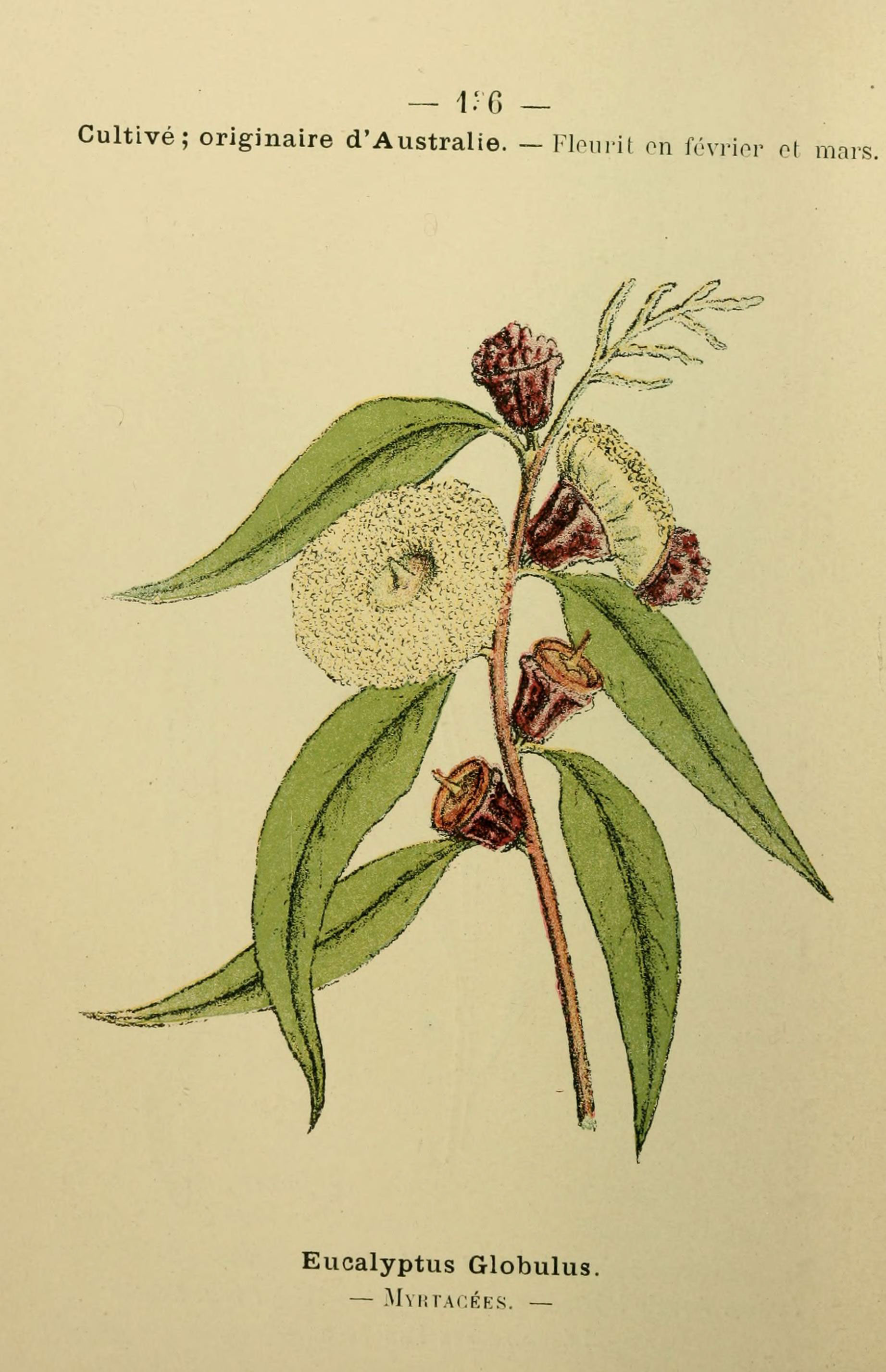
Tasmania: Tasmanian blue gum

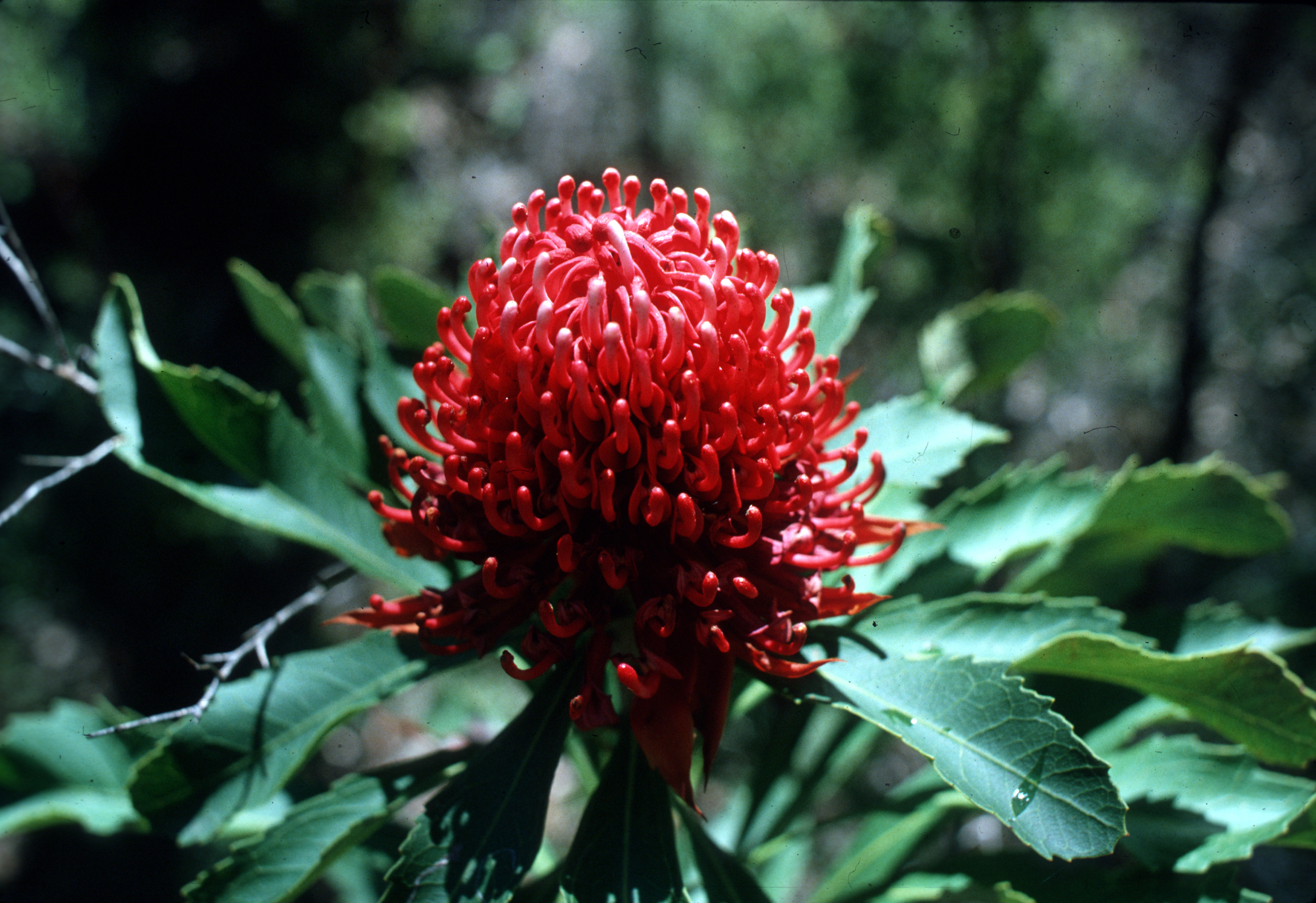
New South Wales: New South Wales waratah

== Other countries ==
While different to the national significance of Australia's Wattle Day, other countries have separate events related to wattle trees where they have been introduced from Australia.

Since 1931, the French town of Mandelieu-la-Napoule has celebrated the local flowering of wattles known as mimosa (Acacia dealbata) with the eight-day Fête du Mimosa during their winter in February.

Starting in 1946 in Italy, yellow mimosa flowers hold significance as a symbol during International Women's Day.
