= Neil Inall =

Australian journalist (1933–2024)

Neil Inall OAM
- Born: Neil James Inall; 23 August 1933
- Died: 6 September 2024 (aged 91)
- Education: Western Sydney University (PhD, 2015)
- Occupations: Journalist, television presenter, agronomist
- Known for: Producing and presenting rural affairs radio and television programs
- Television: Outlook; Horizon-5; Countrywide; Cross Country

Neil James Inall OAM (23 August 1933 – 6 September 2024) was an Australian journalist, television presenter and agronomist.

Inall is perhaps best known for hosting ABC TV's national rural affairs program Countrywide from 1979 until 1983.

== Career ==
Inall grew up on a mixed farm in the Hawkesbury Valley in New South Wales and worked for three years as a jackaroo before attending Hawkesbury Agricultural College, where he graduated in 1957.

After spending four years working as an agronomist for the New South Wales Department of Agriculture, Inall resigned in January 1962 to join the Australian Broadcasting Corporation as a rural officer at 2CR in Orange, New South Wales. While working in this role, Inall helped initiate a national Sunday morning radio program called Always on Sunday which debuted in 1970, originally broadcast from Orange and hosted by Alex Nichol. Always on Sunday was the precursor to the long-running Australia All Over which has been hosted by Ian McNamara since 1986. Reflecting on the program's inception, Inall said in 2015 that he proposed a "more lively" Sunday morning program after realising the current offerings on ABC Radio were "really dull."

While working at the ABC in Orange, Inall made his first foray into television, producing the rural program Signpost which aired on the ABC's regional television stations and ABC TV in Canberra.

Prior to his tenure as the host of Countrywide, Inall anchored a similar national program on ABC TV called Horizon-5 from 1976 until 1979.

When he was dropped as the host of Countrywide by the ABC in December 1983, the decision was widely derided by viewers and media commentators alike.

After his departure from the ABC, Inall worked for the Rural Press Group where as the head of the company's electronic media department he was responsible for introducing a videotext service.

In 1984, Inall and Hazel Hawke appeared in the Greening of Australia television campaign produced by the Department of Home Affairs and Environment, where they both encouraged Australians to plant more trees.

After becoming a regular contributor on the Nine Network's Today program in the mid-1980's, Inall commenced hosting Cross Country, a rural affairs program produced at the Prime Television station in Wagga Wagga, New South Wales and aired nationally on the Seven Network from 1989 to 1999.

From July 1989 to October 1990, Inall also wrote his own newspaper column for The Sun-Herald called "Ear to the Ground."

Away from the media, Inall held a number of roles with various organisations throughout his career including serving as chairman of the Native Vegetation Advisory Council and as a New South Wales committee member of The Crawford Fund. He also chaired the committee which held the Feeding Sydney Conference at Western Sydney University in 2014.

In 2015, Inall was awarded a PhD from Western Sydney University for his thesis about John Kerin, a long-serving Minister for Agriculture, Fisheries and Forestry in the Hawke Government, which was entitled The legacy of John Kerin : a Labor Party man of rural policy based on science.

== Personal life ==
Inall married Ann (née Keenan) in June 1968 in Mildura; they had two sons and a daughter.

Inall died on 6 September 2024, at the age of 91. Brief tributes were paid to Inall on the ABC's Australia All Over and Landline. His funeral was held at St James' Church, Sydney on 16 September.

== Honours ==
Inall was named as the Man of the Year in Australian Agriculture in 1980.

In 1992, Inall was the co-recipient of the Australian Medal of Agricultural Science.

In the 2009 Queen's Birthday Honours, Inall was awarded the Medal of the Order of Australia (OAM) in recognition of his service to the farming and rural sector.

In 2017, Inall was awarded a Community Award by Western Sydney University for his service to the Greater Western Sydney area.
