= Haywire =

Haywire may refer to:

== Arts and media ==
=== Film ===
- Haywire (1980 film), a 1980 American TV movie based on the autobiography by Brooke Hayward
- Haywire (2011 film), a 2011 American action film

=== Television ===
- "Haywire" (Australian Playhouse), a 1966 Australian TV play
- Haywire (TV series), an American television comedy series

=== Fictional characters ===
- Charles "Haywire" Patoshik, a fictional character from the U.S. television series Prison Break
- Haywire, the Nebulan partner of Transformers character Blurr

=== Literature ===
- Haywire (book), the memoir of Brooke Hayward
- Haywire (comics), a minor Marvel Comics character
- Haywire, a short-lived comic book series from DC Comics

== Music ==
- Haywire (band), a Canadian hard rock band
- Haywire (Chris LeDoux album), 1994
- Haywire (Josh Turner album), 2010
- Haywire (mixtape), by Hopsin and SwizZz, 2009
- Haywire 617, a Boston hardcore band

== Other uses ==
- Baling wire, also known as haywire, a type of wire used in agriculture and industry for many uses, including manually binding rectangular bales of hay

== See also ==
- Haywire (slang), origin of some of the uses above
- Haywyre (born 1992), American electronic music producer
- Heywire, a youth initiative of the Australian Government and ABC
