= Bryce Ives =

Australian theatre director

Bryce Ives (born 11 November 1983, in Ballarat) is Artistic Director of Theatre Works in St.Kilda, Artistic Director of the Fairfax Festival in the Murray Mallee region of North West Victoria, and Co-Artistic Director of the Present Tense Ensemble alongside long-term collaborator Nathan Gilkes. In 2019, Ives joined Laureate International Universities as the Vice President of Public Affairs and Communications for Torrens University Australia and the Media Design School in NZ.

Ives has made a significant contribution to youth generated media in Australia, as a former Executive Producer of the ABC Radio project Heywire and former General Manager and President of the Student Youth Network in Melbourne. Ives facilitates the annual ABC Radio Heywire Regional Youth Summit in Canberra, in 2018 he facilitated his eleventh Heywire Regional Youth Summit.

Ives is a previous Director of the Arts Academy Ballarat and the Gippsland Centre of Art & Design, the creative art schools Federation University Australia. In 2017, Ives directed a music clip in support of marriage equality featuring students, musicians and local members of the Ballarat community.

Ives has built a strong body of work as a leading thinker and facilitator in Australian Agriculture and Rural Industries, AgTech, and the future of farming. He has facilitated the AgriFutures Horizon Scholarship program for future leaders in Australian Agriculture since 2010, facilitated the process for the National Farmers Federation Talking 2030, leading to the ambitious plan to get Australian Agriculture to $100 Billion at the Farmgate by 2030, and has been heavily involved as a key facilitator and the MC of EvokeAG, the premier AgTech and Innovation Summit in Australia. He wrote a report about young people, perceptions, and the future of Australian Agriculture in 2023 for AgriFutures Australia

In 2002 Ives was named Young Citizen of the Year for the City of Ballarat.
