= Wattle Day Association =

Australian nonprofit organisation

The Wattle Day Association was established in 1998. The three aims of the Wattle Day Association are to raise awareness Australia-wide of:

- National Wattle Day (1 September) as a celebration of Australia and its people
- the golden wattle (Acacia pycnantha) as Australia's national floral emblem and a unifying symbol for all Australians
- wattles, in all their variety, as symbols of Australia

== Background ==
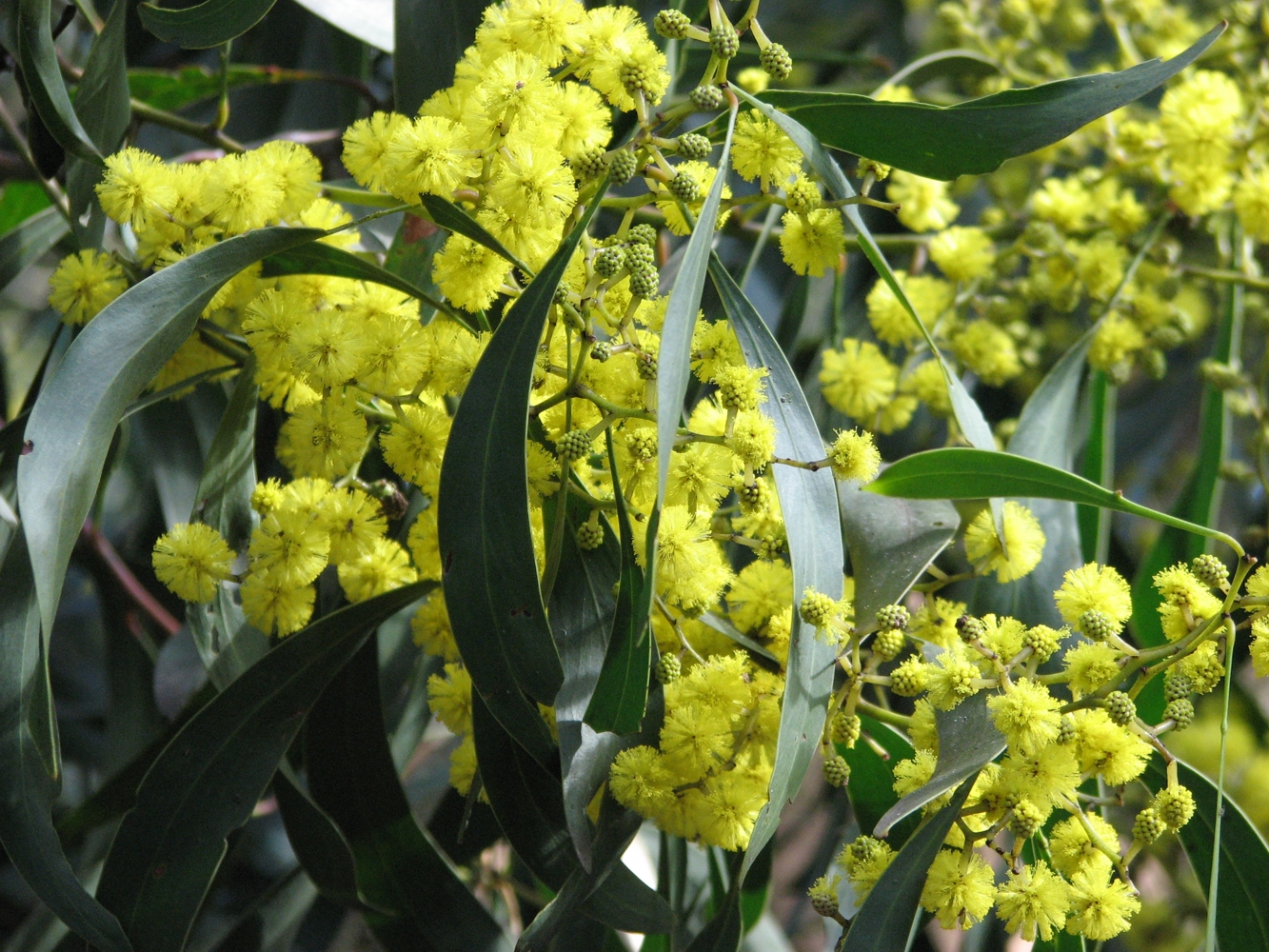
Acacia pycnantha 'golden wattle' - national floral emblem

The history of Wattle Day dates back to the first wattle day in 1910 when it was celebrated in New South Wales, Victoria and South Australia on the same day – 1 September. In 1992, the Governor-General of Australia declared that "September 1 in each year shall be observed as National Wattle Day throughout Australia and in external territories of Australia." Canberran Jack Fahy, disappointed with the lack of public interest in the proclaimed National Wattle Day, founded the Wattle Day Association Inc six years later in 1998. Early members were local Canberrans including historians, botanists, teachers, scientists and wattle enthusiasts. It now has members throughout Australia.

== Activities ==
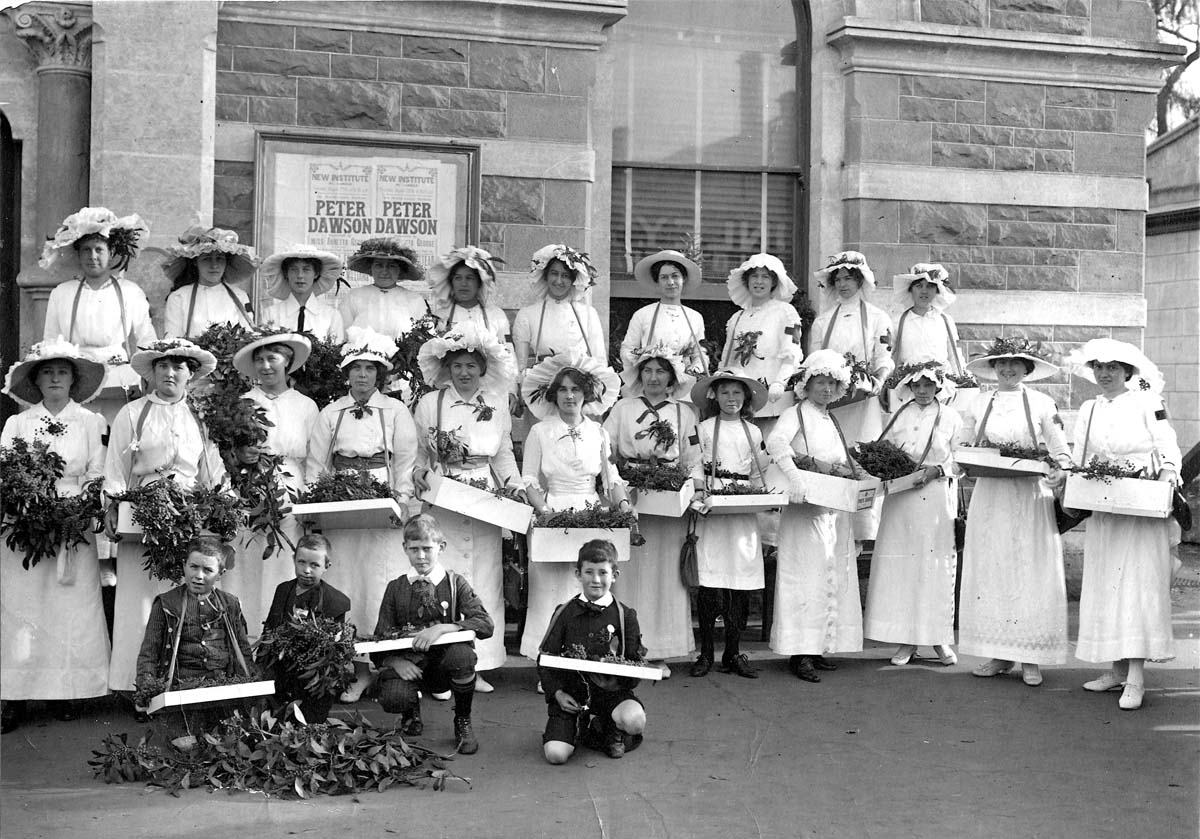
A group of young women, girls and boys on Wattle Day, Saturday 29 August 1914, in Mount Gambier with trays of Wattle blossom to sell to raise money for the Ladies Patriotic Fund

Members of the Wattle Day Association organise their own events and activities for National Wattle Day. It promotes those of other organisations and individuals on its website and social media. These include:

- Events at botanical gardens, arboretums such as the National Arboretum Canberra, national parks, environmental landscape plantings and nurseries
- Wattle walks and talks
- Demonstrations of indigenous use of wattles
- Activities such as tree plantings, wattle themed arts and crafts and wattle songs and poetry through primary schools
- Wattle-themed citizenship ceremonies close to National Wattle Day
- Lighting up in green and gold of significant buildings and landmarks throughout Australia
- Social media promotion through Facebook, X and Instagram

Since 1999, the Association has worked closely with the Governor-General of Australia, Department of Prime Minister and Cabinet and National Capital Authority to promote National Wattle Day.

== See also ==
- National symbols of Australia
- Acacia
