= Australia All Over =

Australian Sunday radio program

Australia All Over is a long-running Australian weekly Sunday morning radio program produced by the Australian Broadcasting Corporation.

The show airs each Sunday morning from 5:30 am until 10:00 am on the ABC Local Radio network and has been continuously presented by Ian McNamara since 1985.

== Summary ==
The program is known for its rural focus and distinct Australiana content, featuring discussions about Australian history and culture.

The show relies heavily on everyday listeners phoning in to have an impromptu conversation with "Macca" to discuss various items of interest to the program's listeners. Each phone call begins with McNamara saying: "G'day, this is Macca...?" or "Australia All Over, hello?".

The program also regularly features Australian music, bush poetry, book readings, bird calls, interviews with special guests and the "Why I live where I live" segment when McNamara reads aloud a letter sent in by a listener describing why they have chosen to live in a specific part of Australia; 250 contributions to the segment were compiled into a book which was published in 2005.

Australia All Over is also known for its theme song, "Macca on a Sunday morning", performed by Drew Forsythe.

== History ==
The program began in 1970 under the name Always on Sunday and was initiated by ABC Rural reporter Neil Inall who considered that the content ABC Radio was producing on Sunday mornings up until then was "really dull". For that reason, Inall proposed to the head of the ABC's rural department Graham White that they introduce a more lively Sunday morning program for the ABC's regional listeners.

It took on the name Australia All Over when McNamara assumed the role as presenter. Prior to McNamara hosting the program, the show was presented by various ABC presenters including Alex Nicol, Colin Munro and Mike Broadhurst.

McNamara's involvement with the program began in 1981 when he hosted the program when Broadhurst went on long service leave, and suggested McNamara as his replacement.

McNamara returned as the program's permanent host in 1985 when he began presenting the program live as opposed to the previous arrangements where it was pre-recorded the previous Thursday.

Before his death in 2010, past presenter Colin Munro continued his involvement with the show by hosting the summer edition of the program called Summer All Over when McNamara took annual leave over the Christmas and New Year period.

Despite the program originally only being broadcast on the ABC's regional stations, Australia All Over eventually began airing on the network's metropolitan stations including the ABC's Sydney, Canberra and Newcastle stations which started taking Australia All Over in March 1987.

== Outside broadcasts ==
Although chiefly presented from a studio at ABC Radio Sydney, the program is known for holding regular outside broadcasts at various Australian locations where listeners in the local area are invited to watch the program being presented live.

An outside broadcast from the Byron Bay Lighthouse almost failed to go ahead after technicians discovered that wild goats had eaten their way through a cable that had been laid the night before. A technician's assistant managed to herd the goats into an adjacent paddock while a technical producer worked at repairing the cable, finishing with only fifteen minutes until the start of the broadcast.

== Critical reception ==
Although the program has a loyal following, particularly among the older demographics in regional areas, it has attracted harsh criticism throughout its history.

Jane Clark in The Age described McNamara's interaction with the program's listeners as more patronising than friendly.

In 1995, Imre Salusinszky in The Australian said Australia All Over and John Williamson both provided a sound argument for persuading the French to test their nuclear weapons in rural Australia instead of the remote South Pacific.

The Sydney Morning Herald's Harry Robinson said that the program was, to any "savvy" listener, a mash of 1930s folksy corn and a dopey gnome in the ABC's garden. Robinson said that not much happens on the program apart from a lot of phone calls with little substance, consisting only of lengthy discussions about wombats, curlews, white-tailed spiders and mopokes. Robinson also said that it was easy for the program to cater to "One Nation types", by telling them their world of nice, bland, decent folk is the best of all possibilities because they considered change an abomination.

In a 2013 article in The Sydney Morning Herald relating to Australian radio personalities, Neil McMahon wrote that few national radio announcers "get on your goat" more than McNamara hosting Australia All Over. To illustrate his point, McMahon included actual complaints about McNamara, which included listeners criticising the way he described an Australian Federal Police officer as being "too pretty to be a geek", and the way he asked who the woman was that got "throttled" by her husband. McMahon also cited another self-proclaimed "glued-on ABC listener for 50 years" who said that he would welcome the day when McNamara retires.

Former ABC managing director David Hill has said he understands why McNamara receives some vitriolic criticism as he is philosophically an old Australian working-class conservative and a real non-progressive, traditionalist uncomfortable with change. Despite this, it was Hill who convinced the metropolitan ABC stations to take Australia All Over, growing the program's estimated audience to 1.5 million.

== Merchandise ==
Since McNamara assumed the role of presenting Australia All Over, the program has spawned a number of books written by McNamara, along with a number of albums featuring music and content from the show, including songs performed by McNamara himself.
