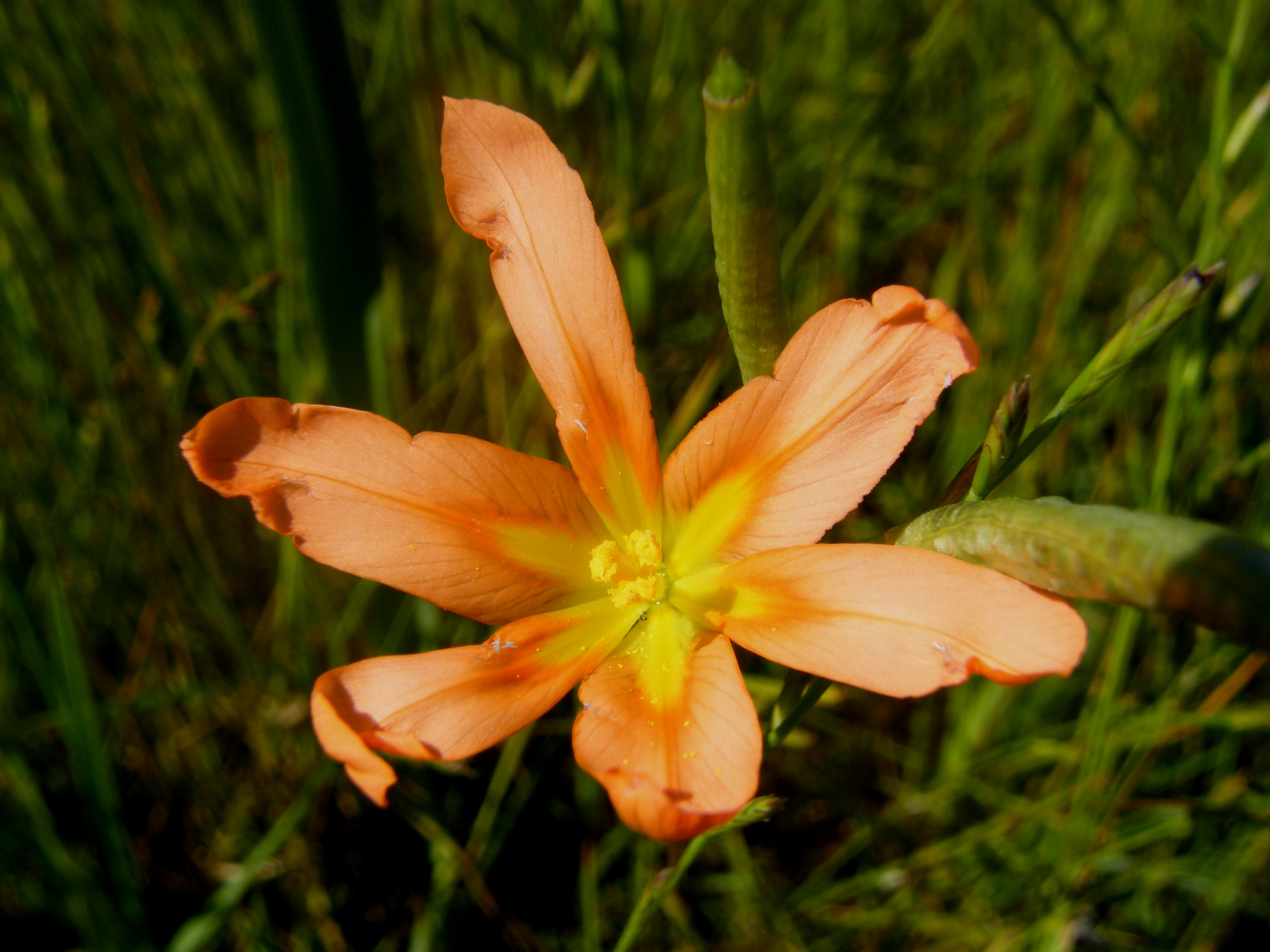

Scientific classification
- Kingdom: Plantae
- Clade: Tracheophytes
- Clade: Angiosperms
- Clade: Monocots
- Order: Asparagales
- Family: Iridaceae
- Genus: Moraea
- Species: M. flaccida

Binomial name
- Moraea flaccida (Sweet) Steud.

Synonyms
- Homeria flaccida Sweet

= Moraea flaccida =

Species of flowering plant

Moraea flaccida, commonly known as the one-leaf Cape tulip, is a bulb native to South Africa, including in Fynbos habitats. Despite its common name, this species is not a tulip (Liliaceae) but rather belongs to the family Iridaceae.

It has become a noxious weed in farmland in southern Australia, including parts of Western Australia, Victoria and South Australia.
