= Ian McNamara =

Australian radio personality

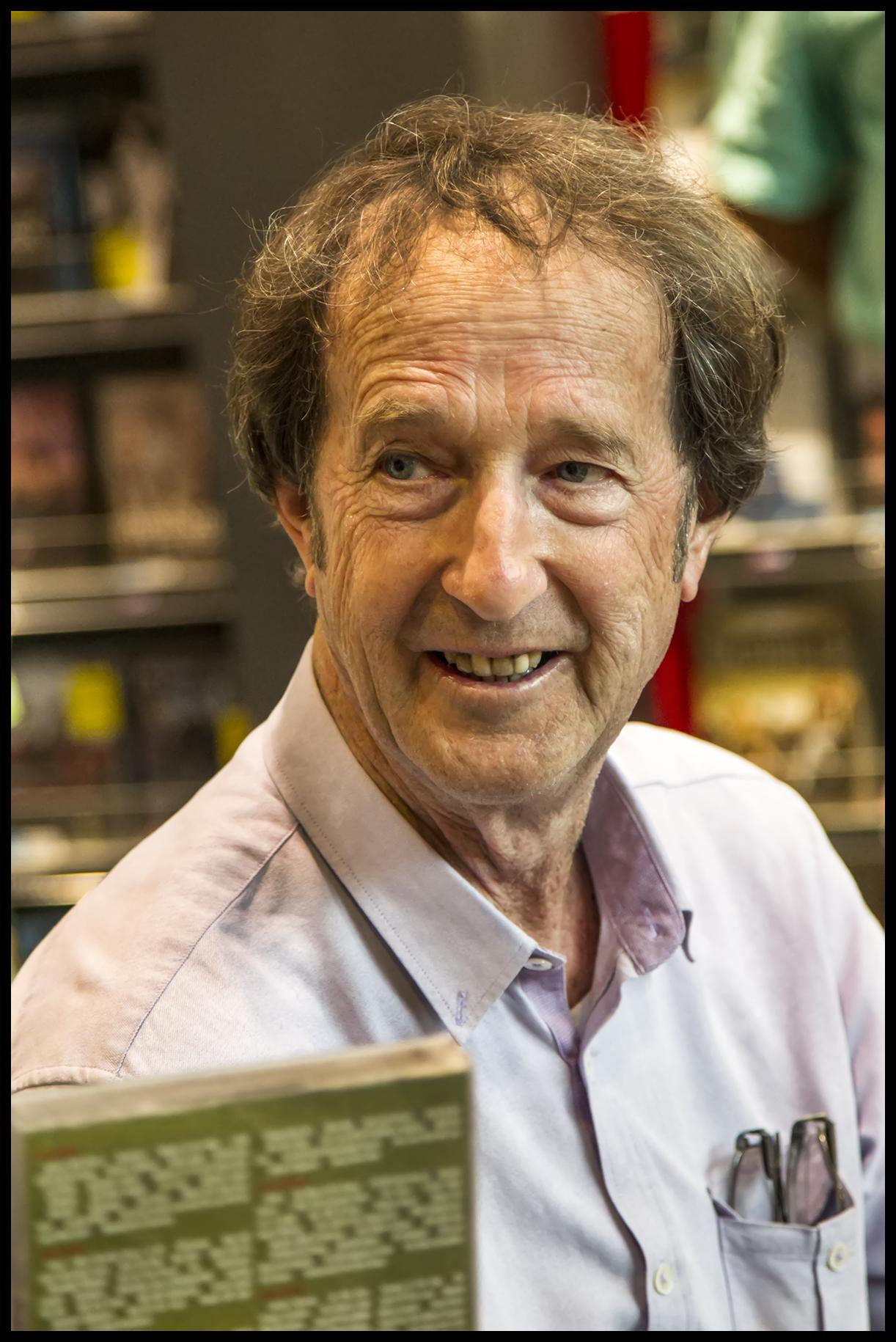
- McNamara at the Cairns ABC Shop in 2015.
- Born: 17 December 1951 (age 74); Sydney
- Occupation: Radio broadcaster

Ian McNamara AM, commonly known as "Macca", is an Australian radio presenter, singer-songwriter and producer, best known for hosting the Australian Broadcasting Corporation's long running radio program Australia All Over on the ABC Local Radio network.

== Early life ==
McNamara grew up in the southern Sydney suburb of Oatley. He attended Oatley West Public School.

McNamara graduated from the University of Sydney with a Bachelor of Economics degree before working as a jackaroo. In 1973 he played the guitar with Col Joye and the Joy Boys.

== Career ==
McNamara first joined the ABC in 1974, in the industrial relations department, but moved to the rural department two years later as a rural reporter. He then spent 12 months in television, working on A Big Country and Countrywide, before returning to rural radio in 1980 as a reporter and, eventually, the presenter of Australia All Over. In 1984, he was appointed executive producer of the current affairs program City Extra (a 2BL current affairs show), but late in 1985 he returned to the Regional Radio Unit as executive producer of programs including Morning Extra, Australia All Over and Resources.

Musically, his CD compilations include Australia All Over: Volumes 1, 2 & 3 (1987; 1988; 1989), Over The Top With Macca (1991), Macca Tracks (1993), Macca On Air (1996), Macca by Request (two issues: 2002, 2004), and The Last Ten Years (2007).

As an author, his work publications include Australia All Over (1992), Australia All Over 2 (1994), Macca's Australia: Australia All Over (1997), On the Road with Macca (2003), Why I Live Where I Live (2005), and Australia All Over: Celebrating Twenty-Five Years (2007). More recent publications include Say G'day: 'Australia All Over' Takes to the Road (2010) and Australia All Over: Song of the Thong and other Legendary Verses (2011). He also co-authored two cookbooks with Maggie Beer and Valli Little in 2006 and 2008.

== Awards ==
In the 1994 Australia Day Honours, McNamara was made a Member of the Order of Australia (AM) for "service to the presentation and promotion of Australia's non-urban culture, through the radio programme Australia All Over".
