= A Big Country =

A Big Country is an now-defunct Australian television documentary series produced by the Australian Broadcasting Corporation (ABC).

== History ==
The series' purpose was to document life in rural Australia for the information of Australian city dwellers. The stories were identified by ABC staff working in rural areas.

Based in Sydney (part of the ABC Rural division), the production team consisted of a producer, a reporter, a sound recordist and camera operator, possibly accompanied by trainees. 370 episodes each of 30 minutes were produced in 32 series between 1968 and 1991 and were screened on the ABC network in prime time to high ratings.

The series also spawned a series of books based on the stories in the episodes.

== Awards ==
The series won numerous awards including:

- Logie Awards of 1976
- Logie Awards of 1979
- Logie Awards of 1981
