= ABC Rural =

Department of the Australian Broadcasting Corporation

ABC Rural was a department of the Australian Broadcasting Corporation that produced news, business, and entertainment programs targeted at audiences in regional Australia. The department employed 70 staff and reporters around the country. In 2015, the Rural department was rolled into the ABC's Regional division as part of a restructure of the organisation. The Rural department continues to operate as part of the ABC's Regional and Local division, with Rural Reporters stationed in most of the regional offices and Country Hour executive producers and presenters in each capital city. The ABC Rural website also continues to operate as a portal to all of the corporation's farming, agriculture and mining news.

== History ==
The history of the Rural department can be traced back to 1945, when moves were made to formalise the provision of specialist rural news and information on ABC Radio. Although the ABC had provided specialist information to regional audiences (such as markets and rainfall figures), the head of the new department, John Douglass, established a new program titled The Country Hour, first broadcast on December 3, 1945.

Dick Snedden was the original host, known to viewers in New South Wales for his reporting of the Sydney Show. Announcers were later appointed in other capital cities, to provide state-level news and information (all the while contributing to the national portion of the program). The Country Hour was later presented separately for each state.

In 1951, regional 'extension officers' were appointed to some areas undertake interviews and cover local stories. Following the 1956 introduction of television to more densely populated areas, a number of television programs were launched - To Market To Market, A Big Country, Countrywide and Landline all debuted in subsequent years. The titles of extension officers were changed in the 1980s to 'rural reporters', and their supervisors 'executive producers'. Their roles however, remained almost identical.

In 1990 ABC's first indigenous rural reporter, Frank Walsh, who was brought up in Mount Magnet in the Murchison region of Western Australia.

An 'online gateway' was launched as part of the ABC's website in 1999, offering news, and streaming audio and video.

== Programming ==
=== Radio ===
- The Country Hour - ABC Local Radio
- Bush Telegraph - Radio National, Radio Australia
- Country Breakfast - Radio National
- Rural Reporter - Radio National, ABC Local Radio
- Resources Beat - ABC NewsRadio
- Mining and Resources
- Heywire- ABC Local Radio, Radio National, Triple J, Radio Australia, ABC TV

=== Television ===
- Landline - ABC TV

== See also ==
- Australian Broadcasting Corporation
- ABC Radio and Regional Content
- ABC Television
