= Bush Telegraph =

Australian radio program

- Genre: Music, stories, rural news and reports
- Running time: 1 hour (12:00 am – 12:00 am)
- Country of origin: Australia
- Language(s): English
- Home station: Radio National
- Hosted by: Cameron Wilson
- Original release: 23 April 2001 – 19 December 2014
- Website: Bush Telegraph web site

Bush Telegraph was a radio program on the Australian Broadcasting Corporation's Radio National network, broadcast weekdays (Monday-Friday) at 11-12am, presenting stories from rural and regional Australia. It ran from 23 April 2001 until 19 December 2014.

"Bush telegraph" is the Australian country term for the informal network which spreads news and gossip through a region of rural or outback Australia.

== History ==
The show began on 23 April 2001 and the last program was aired on Friday, 19 December 2014.

== Format ==
The show presented original stories, Australian music, rural news and reports from ABC rural reporters across Australia. The show's topics of debate included genetically modified food, services in rural Australia, climate change and water policies.

=== Special series ===
Bush Telegraph also ran several innovative listener participation series, where listeners were able to vote on aspects of a project through the internet site and phone-in lines, such as:

==== 2002/3: Grow Your Own ====
In 2002 and early 2003, Bush Telegraph listeners voted on production of a cotton crop. Stu Higgins, a cotton farmer from Jandowae (near Chinchilla) in Queensland, offered 5 acres (2 ha) of his crop. The show had weekly updates, and votes were taken on matters such as: how the crop should be fertilised, or whether natural or artificial defoliant should be used. The crop was successful, and achieved a premium price. Higgins received an award, the Queensland Primary Industries Achievement Award for media and communication.

==== 2006: Wine on the Wireless ====
For the 2006 harvest, commencing March 2006, a grape grower and winery owner, Ian Davison of Galens Tor winery near Orange, New South Wales, offered Shiraz grapes for two vintages:

- a listener-decided vintage;
- a competing vintage made by students from the Orange TAFE's oenology course.

Each group would make a barrel of Shiraz wine with the help of professional winemakers, with professional judges deciding on the outcome. Listeners were able to buy bottles of each wine and decide for themselves.

== Presenters ==
The last presenter was Cameron Wilson. Previous presenters include Helen Brown, Michael Mackenzie (2004-2009) and Michael Cathcart (2009-2012).
