= Heywire =

ABC Radio community-based initiative

HEYWIRE is an initiative of ABC Radio through ABC Rural aimed at giving a voice to the issues and aspirations of regional/rural youth; raising awareness about these issues within the broader community; and providing a unique issues-based training opportunity for young community leaders from regional /rural areas. Heywire includes a storytelling competition, a youth leadership summit, a grants program, and the Trailblazers program.

== History ==
Between 1994 and 1997 the ABC's Rural Woman of the Year Award recognised the valuable contribution women make to the rural sector. Having established this ongoing event, in 1998 the ABC shifted the focus of its commitment to rural Australia to youth, and introduced Heywire.

By January 2003, more than 5,000 young people had put their voice forward via Heywire.

From 1998 until 2004, the Heywire Canberra Youth Issues Forum took place in Canberra.

The 40-Hour Drought was an initiative of the Heywire Youth Issues Forum held in February 2007. The challenge was set by ABC Local Radio as a nationwide campaign to encourage people to experience what it is like to live with a limited amount of water. Kicking off at 7am on Wednesday 21 March and finishing at 11pm on Thursday 22 March participants were asked to register and track their progress on a water usage chart. A website was established with water-saving tips and the latest 40-Hour Drought News. The idea was the brainchild of four Heywirers, Gabrielle Connolly from Mitchell in Queensland, David McPherson from Streatham in Victoria, Letitia Irwin from North Rockhampton in Queensland and Martin McConnon form Stonor in Tasmania.

== Description ==
Heywire exists to find out how the young people of rural and regional Australia think and react to their world. Heywire grew out of the ABC's commitment to regional and rural Australia and its purpose was to hear from the direct voice of young people about their concerns, issues, hopes and experience of living and working in regional and rural Australia.

Heywire includes a storytelling competition, a youth leadership summit, a grants program, and the Trailblazers program.

=== ABC Heywire Competition ===
Heywire is open to young people aged between 16 and 22 years who live outside Australia's major cities. These young people are invited to submit a script for a three-minute radio story about what life is like for them. Entry forms are distributed to all post-primary schools and tertiary institutions in regional Australia. They are available from ABC regional radio stations, ABC shops and centres, and through any organisation or industry wishing to encourage young people to participate. Entries are judged in the regions and one winner is chosen from each of approximately 40 ABC radio regions around Australia.

The winning entry is professionally produced by the ABC and broadcast during the summer months on the ABC – on regional and metropolitan Local Radio stations, on Triple J, nationally on Radio National, through Radio Australia, and via ABC Online.

=== Heywire Regional Youth Summit ===
Replacing the Heywire Youth Issues Forum, the Heywire Regional Youth Summit is held in February at Parliament House, Canberra.

=== FRRR ABC Heywire Youth Innovation Grants ===
The FRRR ABC Heywire Youth Innovation Grants awards grants to community organisations that they can use to action one of the Heywire Summit ideas.

=== Trailblazers ===
The Trailblazers program allows young people between the age of 18 and 28 to present their ideas. It offers applicants a package that includes media, networking, and mentorship opportunities that allows them to share the story of their work.
