= Androcalva perkinsiana =

Conservation status
- Critically endangered (EPBC Act)

Scientific classification
- Kingdom: Plantae
- Clade: Embryophytes
- Clade: Tracheophytes
- Clade: Spermatophytes
- Clade: Angiosperms
- Clade: Eudicots
- Clade: Rosids
- Order: Malvales
- Family: Malvaceae
- Genus: Androcalva
- Species: A. perkinsiana

Binomial name
- Androcalva perkinsiana (Guymer) C.F.Wilkins & Whitlock

Synonyms
- Androcalva perkinsiana C.F.Wilkins & Whitlock nom. inval.; Commersonia perkinsiana Guymer

Species of shrub

Androcalva perkinsiana, commonly known as headland commersonia, is a species of flowering plant in the family Malvaceae and is endemic to a restricted part of central eastern Queensland. It is a small, erect shrub with hairy young branchlets, oblong or lance-shaped leaves with 5 to 11 pairs of small serrations on the edges, and groups of 3 to 4 pale purple flowers.

== Description ==
Androcalva perkinsiana is an erect shrub that typically grows up to 10 cm (3.9 in) high, 30 cm (12 in) wide, and that forms suckers. Its young branchlets are covered with soft, glandular hairs. The leaves are oblong to lance-shaped, 20–40 mm (0.79–1.57 in) long and 6–11 mm (0.24–0.43 in) wide on a petiole 2–5 mm (0.079–0.197 in) long with triangular stipules 2–3 mm (0.079–0.118 in) long at the base. The edges of the leaves have 5 to 11 pairs of small serrations, the upper surface is covered with star-shaped hairs and the lower surface is velvety-hairy. The flowers are arranged in groups of 3 or 4 on a peduncle 1.5–2.5 mm (0.059–0.098 in) long, each flower on a pedicel less than 2 mm (0.079 in) long, with bracts 2 mm (0.079 in) long at the base. The flowers are pale purple and 7–9 mm (0.28–0.35 in) in diameter with 5 petal-like sepals, the lobes 2.0–3.5 mm (0.079–0.138 in) long. The petals are 3.4–4.0 mm (0.13–0.16 in) long, the middle lobe egg-shaped and the side lobes rounded. Flowering has been recorded in April and December.

== Taxonomy ==
This species was first formally described in 2006 by Gordon Guymer who gave it the name Commersonia perkinsiana in the journal Austrobaileya from specimens collected in the Byfield Conservation Park in 2005. In 2012, Carolyn Wilkins and Barbara Whitlock transferred the species to Androcalva as A. perkinsiana in Australian Systematic Botany. The specific epithet (perkinsiana) honours David Perkins (1945–2006), who furthered the conservation of Queensland's coastal environment and marine parks.

== Distribution and habitat ==
Headland commersonia is only known from a single population on a coastal headland in Byfield Conservation Park where it grows in tussock grassland at Stockyard Point, Queensland. A road and a carpark intersects the known occurrence of this species. Threats to this species include trampling by vehicles or foot traffic, too few fires causing smothering by invasive species, too many fires causing genetic diversity loss, a single pathogen causing the extinction of the species, introduction of an invasive species due to increased visitation, and climate change. The vegetation community which this species grows in is classified as "of concern" under the Queensland Vegetation Management Act 1999. The population of this species is estimated to be fewer than 250 mature individuals. The entire population has a high likelihood either be genetically identical through vegetative reproduction, or consist of a handful of individuals with distinct genetic variations. If the former is true an introduction of a plant pathogen has the potential to cause determent to the species population.

Associated species of this community include:

- Acacia julifera
- Acacia juncifolia
- Comesperma oblongatum
- Chrysocephalum apiculatum
- Dodonaea lanceolata var. subsessilifolia
- Grevillea banksii
- Hardenbergia violacea
- Coronidium lanuginosum (Helichrysum lanuginosum)
- Xerochrysum bracteatum

== Conservation status ==
Androcalva perkinsiana is listed as "critically endangered" under the Australian Government Environment Protection and Biodiversity Conservation Act 1999.

== See also ==
- Paspalum batianoffii
