= Raspberry Creek =

Raspberry Creek may refer to:

- Raspberry Creek (British Columbia), a creek in British Columbia, Canada
- Raspberry Creek (Queensland), a creek in Queensland, Australia
- Raspberry Creek Homestead, a former homestead in Queensland, Australia
