= Marmalade (disambiguation) =

Marmalade is a preserve made from citrus fruits.

Marmalade may also refer to:

== Arts and entertainment ==
=== Music ===
- Marmalade (band), a Scottish pop music group since 1966
- "Marmalade" (Macklemore song), 2017, featuring Lil Yachty
- Marmalade Records, a British label, 1966–1969
- "Marmalade", a 1998 heavy metal song on System of a Down
- "Marmalade" (Wolf Howl Harmony song), 2025

=== Other media ===
- Marmalade (film), a 2024 romantic heist film
- Marmalade (magazine), a British art and culture quarterly, 2001–2009
- Trevor Marmalade (born 1962), Australian comedian
- Marmalade Atkins, a fictional teenager created by Andrew Davies
- Professor Rupert Marmalade IV, a guinea pig character from The Bad Guys books

== Other uses ==
- Marmalade (insurance), a British car insurance firm founded in 2006
- Marmalade (software), a 2015 framework for mobile games
- Marmalade District (Salt Lake City), Utah, US

== See also ==
- Marmelade, a town in Haiti
- Orange marmalade (disambiguation)
