= Old Byfield Road =

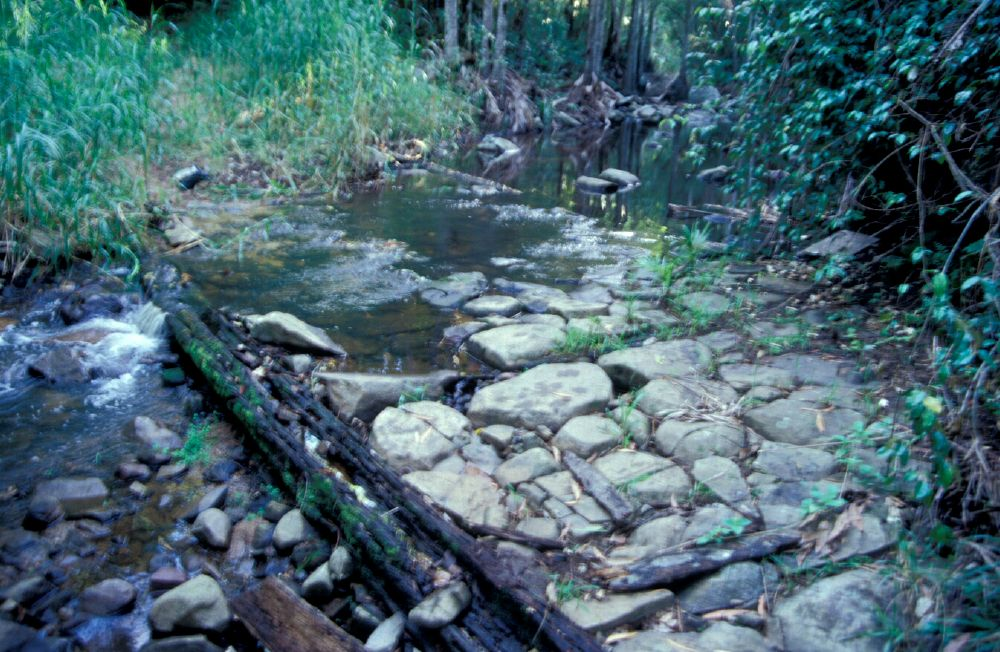
- Stone-pitched crossing on Old Byfield Road, 2003

- Location within Queensland Location within Australia
- 22.8464°S 150.6525°E
- Location: Old Byfield Road, Byfield, Shire of Livingstone, Queensland, Australia

History
- Design period: 1840s–1860s (mid-19th century)
- Built: 1860s–1940s

Queensland Heritage Register
- Official name: Old Byfield Road and Stone-Pitched Crossing
- Type: state heritage (built)
- Designated: 9 July 2004
- Reference no.: 601746
- Significant period: 1860s–1940s (fabric; main period of historical use).
- Significant components: ford

Old Byfield Road is a heritage-listed road at Old Byfield Road, Byfield, Shire of Livingstone, Queensland, Australia. It was built from 1860s to 1940s. It was added to the Queensland Heritage Register on 9 July 2004.

== History ==
The road leading to and from the ford at Byfield Creek was established in the 1860s when the district was occupied by pastoral interests. It was a section of the sole track from Maryvale Station north to Byfield Head Station, and continuing on to stations in the Shoalwater area. A specific date of construction for the stone-pitched ford across Byfield Creek on this road has not been established, but as the ford facilitated access to Byfield Head Station and to properties to the north and west of Byfield, it may date to the 1860s when Byfield Head Station was established on the northern bank of the creek opposite where the ford is now sited. The crossing is the only known surviving section of stone pitching along what was, from settlement in the 1860s to the 1930s, the only access route to stations directly north of Yeppoon.

Byfield (originally Bayfield) is an isolated district, sandwiched between the Byfield Range and the Capricorn Coast. Traditionally it was home to the Butcha-Bura people (meaning men of the Banksia or Honey Suckle Tree). The Butcha-Bura belonged to the Ningebul tribe, which in turn was part of the Darrambul Nation, and they lived within the Byfield district until the latter part of the 19th century.

The area was explored by Ludwig Leichhardt and Thomas Mitchell between 1844 and 1846 and provided the most manageable overland route to the grassy plains of Shoalwater and Broadsound to the north. Land management practices of the Butcha-Bura people contributed to the development of these plains, which later proved ideal for the grazing of sheep and cattle. Fire stick farming enticed wallabies and kangaroo to feed on sweet new growth of grass, making hunting practices easier and more predictable.

Broadsound and the Isaac River country were explored by William Landsborough and J McDonald between 1847 and 1858, for the purpose of marking out runs. On 10 January 1854 the New South Wales Government proclaimed the Port Curtis Pastoral District open to settlement under pastoral occupation license. Landsborough acquired the Shoalwater run for a short period before L Samuel won a tender for it in 1858. The run was renamed Raspberry Creek due to the abundance of native raspberry in the area.

The first wave of permanent non-indigenous settlers to the Byfield and Shoalwater districts commenced in the early 1860s, with the arrival of the Hutton, Ross, Atherton and Tucker families, mostly from the New England district of New South Wales. In February 1863 the Tucker family selected the Maryvale and Bayfield (later Byfield) runs. Robert Ross and James Hutton took over the Raspberry Creek license from Samuel in 1863, along with the leases of Shoalwater and Banksia Plain in the same year. Hutton later bought out Ross' share in Raspberry Creek. The Ross family, with various financial partners, obtained much of the coastal country from the mouth of the Fitzroy River north to the peninsula at Shoalwater Bay. The Peninsula run was forfeited by Ross in 1864 and was successfully bid for at auction by Edward Hampton (Cranky) Baker. By 1865, Elliot of Tilpal had joined the Huttons, Newbold and "Cranky" Baker as being among the first to permanently settle to the north of Byfield Creek in the Shoalwater area.

In the 1860s the Byfield and Shoalwater districts were accessed via a single circuitous route from Rockhampton, by-passing the Berserker Range which lay between the coast and the Fitzroy River. Materials, livestock and other goods were transported to and from these remote northern properties via this route, which linked head station to head station, and crossed Byfield Creek near Byfield Head Station.

An October 1868 survey of Maryvale Run (survey plan P42.90) shows the "Road to Byfield" linking Maryvale and Byfield head stations. Byfield Head Station was located on the northern bank of Byfield Creek near the creek crossing.

In the mid-1880s the Byfield district was surveyed into farm portions and opened for agricultural selection. Pastoral leases gave way to agriculture, encouraged by longer tenure and high yields from relatively small areas. An 1887 survey plan of the farm portions surrounding the Byfield Head Station block (portion 171, surveyed in 1870) shows the old route linking Byfield with stations to the north and west, circumventing the homestead block along its eastern and northern boundaries. In 1887 this route was surveyed officially as the main road to Raspberry Creek and Peninsula stations, and heading south to Maryvale, crossing Byfield Creek in the approximate location of the stone-pitched ford, although the ford itself is not indicated on the map. The section of this road which follows the eastern boundary of the Byfield homestead block is now known as Richters Road. A second track, marked as 'old postman's track', was also indicated on the 1887 survey plan. This track traversed the Byfield homestead block diagonally from northwest to southeast, meeting Byfield Creek at the approximate location of the stone-pitched ford and the road south to Maryvale, and joining the road to Raspberry Creek north of the Byfield Head Station block.

The influx of new settlers increased traffic over the old Byfield Road across Byfield Creek. They needed to bring goods in and out by wagon and required a reliable crossing for foot traffic, vehicles and animals. In 1888 a weekly mail service from Yeppoon to Raspberry Creek via Maryvale and Byfield commenced. The route was over 80 miles (130 km) using two or three horses with pack saddles to carry mail and goods to be delivered. Jock Cowan continued this service to the residents of Byfield and Shoalwater for 40 years, using the Byfield Creek crossing to gain access to the northern route to Raspberry Creek via what is now Richters Road.

In the 1930s the Sherriff brothers introduced motorised delivery vehicles on the mail route. Beginning with motor bikes and then a utility fitted out like a little shop, they sold cigarettes, chocolates and odds and ends to residents along with delivering the mail once a week on a Sunday, using the crossing to access northern properties.

Well into the 20th century, horses and cattle continued to be driven along the old Byfield Road into Yeppoon for the sales. The Huttons of Raspberry Creek and Shoalwater runs were prominent in the establishment of the pastoral industry in Central Queensland, and worked with the Flowers brothers of nearby Yandouble and Pine Mountain to establish a live cattle export from Port Clinton to New Caledonia. To get cattle to the Rockhampton market, the Huttons and other graziers would drive them along the Byfield Road, using the fording to cross Byfield Creek to reach Adelaide Park Road, which follows the Mount Hedlow route around the Berserker Range. The Huttons, as with many families in the region, also bred their own racehorses along with work and saddle horses. Horse breeders such as the Huttons and Geddes found there was more profit in selling horses to India as army remounts and polo ponies than selling cattle. To get these horses to markets, they either needed to be driven along the route that crossed Byfield Creek, or loaded onto ships at Port Clinton.

Country race meetings and other social events were held on the station runs between 1879 and 1909, attracting visitors to the Shoalwater district from as far afield as Mt Hedlow and The Oaks. These races were held under the banner of the Palmerston Amateur Turf Club, formed in 1879, and known as "The Raspberry Creek Races" although events were held at Banksia, The Oaks and Tooloombah as well as Raspberry Creek. Travel to and from the northern stations for these and other social engagements was only possible via the old Byfield Road and required traversing the Byfield Creek crossing either by buggy or on horseback.

Byfield district graziers and fruit-growers used the old road over Byfield Creek until a by-pass was opened in the early 1940s, in response to pressure from an increasing number of residents attracted to the area. A c. 1936 map of the area shows the development of the bypass as being nearly complete, but resumption of land through Lot 10 delayed completion of the road until the early 1940s.

The bypass, known as the Yeppoon-Byfield Road, gives access to the Byfield State School, Post Office and General Store and provides a comfortable journey for travellers between Yeppoon and properties north of Byfield Creek, with overpasses constructed over creeks and the roadway designed as a durable all-weather passage. This bypass circumvents the road leading to and around the boundary of Lot 171 and rejoins the original route at the northern intersection of Yaxley and Byfield Roads.

Although the Byfield Creek crossing on the old Byfield Road was cut off by the bypass, it remained in use as a short-cut for local property owners and council workers, being used by foot traffic, horseback riders, vehicles and heavy machinery, until very recent times. In an effort to stop vehicles using the crossing, the Livingstone Shire Council placed bollards across the old roadway, but these were removed shortly after by persons unknown and have not been replaced. By the early 21st century the old road south of the Byfield Creek crossing was overgrown, with re-growth vegetation, fallen trees and branches making it difficult for vehicles to access the crossing. The road following the eastern boundary of Lot 171 (Richters Road) is still in use, but no longer crosses Byfield Creek. It is unlikely that the stone-pitched crossing will return to regular local use.

Local interest in the stone-pitched crossing and the portion of the old road bounded by the Yeppoon-Byfield and Richters roads has remained strong, with the local Byfield State School using the area for Remnant Vegetation studies since the late 1990s. For descendants of the early pastoral and agricultural settlers still residing in the Byfield district, the stone-pitched crossing and road remains a tangible link with the past. Continued community involvement in the maintenance and conservation of the old road and ford resulted in its nomination to the Queensland Heritage Register.

== Description ==
The portion of the old Byfield Road under consideration lies between the Yeppoon-Byfield Road and Richters Road, and is just under 450 metres (1,480 ft) in length. The road incorporates a stone-pitched crossing over Byfield Creek at its northern end.

The stone-pitched ford crosses Byfield Creek in a north-south direction at a bearing of 20?. It has a rectangular frame of timber sleepers fitted together and secured by bolts, presumably iron coach bolts, and filled with stone pitching to create a causeway across the creek.

The exposed fording is 4.8 metres (16 ft) wide by 9.4 metres (31 ft) in length. The average dimensions of the framework logs are: western log 40 centimetres (16 in) diameter; eastern log 30 centimetres (12 in) diameter; southern log 24 centimetres (9.4 in) diameter; and northern log 15 centimetres (5.9 in) diameter.

The stone pitching extends into the northern embankment past the water-mark. Within the crossing some stones have become loose and dislodged from their positions, which may be a result of natural erosion (scouring), or from motor-vehicles. Some subsidence has occurred, with the level of some stones lower in position compared to others, and cracking of some stones is evident. The predominant area of weathering and subsidence occurs in the middle of the ford, where water appears to be permanent to semi-permanent. This part of the ford is the most vulnerable to erosion associated with high water velocity during flooding.

A natural sand deposit on the southern bank of the creek is encroaching onto the crossing, and plant shoots are growing between the stone pitching. The log at the southern aspect is exposed for only a small portion, less than 50 centimetres (20 in), the remainder being covered by encroaching sand deposits, up to an approximate depth of 20 centimetres (7.9 in). Sediment deposits currently extend to approximately 4.6 metres (15 ft) from the point of the southern sleeper into the fording.

At the south-west cross-section, an exposed bolt is located in the middle of the southern log, approximately 12 centimetres (4.7 in) from its upper edge. Exposed height of the bolt is approximately 9 centimetres (3.5 in) and it appears to be an iron coach bolt.

In the south-west corner, the log appears to extend into the creek bank and is covered by sediments, indicating a continuation of the fording. Combined with the presence of sandy loam sediments extending approx 12 to 13 metres (39 to 43 ft) further south up the embankment, the apparent extension of the log may indicate the fording extends further into the southern bank than what is currently exposed.

From the crossing, the southern section of the old stock route extends approximately 420 metres (1,380 ft) to the Yeppoon-Byfield Road. There is a large sandy deposit extending 12 to 13 metres (39 to 43 ft) up the bank from the creek, which appears to have been washed downslope from loose deposits. Above the sand-bank, the roadway is composed of clay and stone which rises for several metres before levelling out, with the soil changing to a loamy composition. Native trees, ferns and palms grow thickly along the embankment and creek bank.

Continuing towards the Yeppoon-Byfield Road, the path is covered with ground vegetation, leaf litter, including pine needles and fallen branches mixed with loose sand and soil. Towards the intersection with the Yeppoon-Byfield Road, a culvert has been created for draining water away from the road. Ground vegetation, mainly grasses and some saplings, provides a masking effect along the side of the Yeppoon- Byfield Road, making the entrance to the old road easy to overlook when driving past.

The northern section of the old road extends approximately 20 metres (66 ft) from the northern bank of Byfield Creek along what is now part of Richters Road reserve. There is no sand deposit, with the embankment composed of a clay-based soil. There is thick ground-cover vegetation to either side of the path leading up the embankment and onto Richters Road, which is predominately blady grass. This ground-cover hides the entrance to the old road from Richters Road. Native trees, ferns and palms grow along either side of the pathway on the embankment down to the creek.

== Heritage listing ==
The Old Byfield Road was listed on the Queensland Heritage Register on 9 July 2004 having satisfied the following criteria.

The place is important in demonstrating the evolution or pattern of Queensland's history.

The Old Byfield Road was in use from the 1860s and is important in illustrating the pattern of non-indigenous settlement in the Byfield, Shoalwater and Broadsound districts of central Queensland. The old road was the only access route to stations north and west of Byfield until the early 1940s, and was important in the establishment of the cattle and later fruit growing industries of the Capricorn Coast. The stone-pitched crossing which fords Byfield Creek along this route may date to the 1860s, and is integral to our understanding of the function of this road as a principal access route. This crossing was the only made access to the northern end of Byfield and outlying properties until the final section of the Yeppoon-Byfield Road was opened to traffic in the early 1940s.

The place demonstrates rare, uncommon or endangered aspects of Queensland's cultural heritage.

The place is significant as the only remaining unmodified section of the original road through Byfield to and from properties in Shoalwater and Broadsound. The stone-pitched crossing is important in demonstrating a method of constructing fords which is no longer practiced, and is of particular interest as the only remaining stone-pitched crossing in the Byfield area in an unmodified condition.

The place is important in demonstrating the principal characteristics of a particular class of cultural places.

The stone-pitched crossing is important in demonstrating a method of constructing fords which is no longer practiced, and is of particular interest as the only remaining stone-pitched crossing in the Byfield area in an unmodified condition.

The place has a strong or special association with a particular community or cultural group for social, cultural or spiritual reasons.

The place is valued by the Byfield community for its historical and educational associations. The crossing and early road has special association for the local community with the work of early settlers and postal workers, and is valued for its important role in early transport and communication in an otherwise isolated district. The place is also valued by the community for its remnant native vegetation.
