= Stockyard, Queensland (Livingstone Shire) =

Stockyard
- Suburb
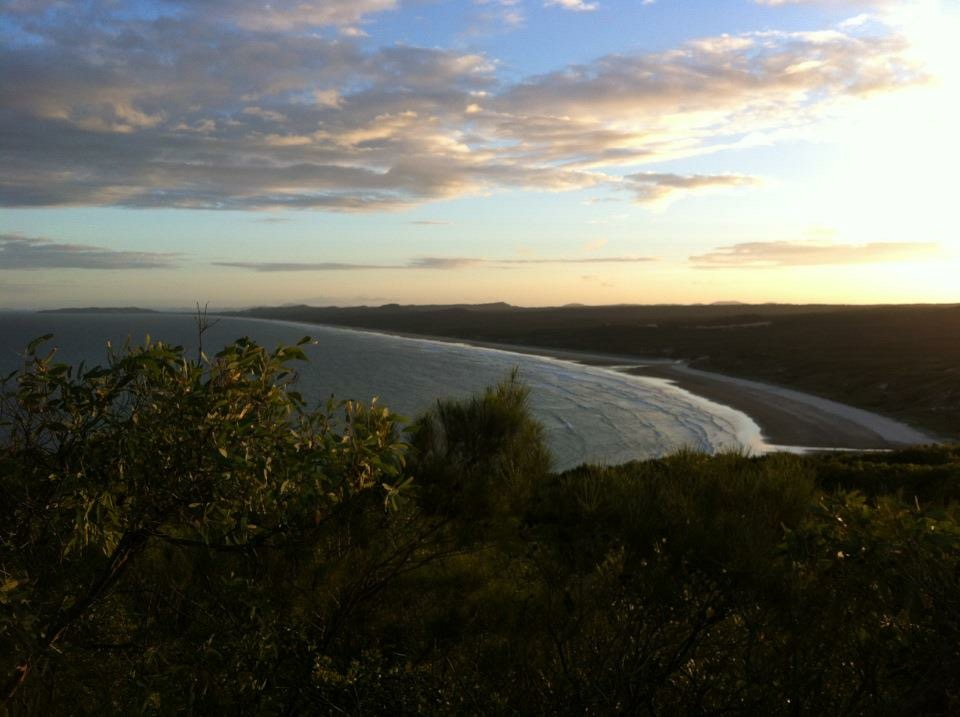
- Nine Mile Beach, 2012

- Interactive map of Stockyard
- Coordinates: 22.8483°S 150.7961°E
- Country: Australia
- State: Queensland
- LGA: Livingstone Shire
- Location: 25.2 km (15.7 mi) E of Byfield; 59.6 km (37.0 mi) NNE of Yeppoon; 96.5 km (60.0 mi) NNE of Rockhampton; 735 km (457 mi) N of Brisbane

Government
  - State electorate: Keppel
  - Federal division: Capricornia

Area
  - Total: 301.9 km^{2} (116.6 sq mi)

Population
  - Total: 16 (2021 census)
  - Density: 0.0530/km^{2} (0.137/sq mi)
- Postcode: 4703
Suburbs around Stockyard
Weerriba	Shoalwater	Shoalwater
Byfield	Stockyard	Coral Sea
Woodbury	Woodbury	Farnborough

Stockyard is a coastal locality in the Livingstone Shire, Queensland, Australia. The town of Stockyard Point is located within the locality (22.8141°S 150.8061°E). In the 2021 census, Stockyard had a population of 16 people.

== Geography ==
Water Park Creek forms the southern and south-western boundaries, while the Coral Sea forms the eastern. Sandy Creek, a tributary of Water Park Creek, rises in the west of the locality and forms part of the western boundary.

The locality has a number of coastal features (from north to south along the coast):

- Five Rocks Beach (22.7755°S 150.8080°E), extending north into neighbouring Shoalwater
- Stockyard Point (22.8175°S 150.8101°E)
- Nine Mile Beach (22.8664°S 150.7900°E), between Stockyard Point and Water Park Point
- Water Park Point (22.9313°S 150.7964°E)
- Greenslopes Inlet (22.915°S 150.7533°E)
- Greenslopes Point (22.9240°S 150.7518°E)
- Little Corio Bay (22.9377°S 150.7969°E)

The town of Stockyard point is located approximately 800 metres (2,600 ft) north-west of the headland Stockyard Point. It is surrounded by the Byfield Conservation Park.

Stockyard has the following mountains (from north to south):

- The Peaks (22.7639°S 150.7257°E) 335 metres (1,099 ft)
- Mount Atherton (22.7655°S 150.7465°E) 442 metres (1,450 ft)

Byfield National Park occupies almost all of the locality. There is no other land use apart from the town and the protected areas.

== Demographics ==
In the 2016 census, Stockyard had a population of 16 people.

In the 2021 census, Stockyard had a population of 16 people.

Many of the houses in Stockyard Point are used as holiday homes. As the Australian census collects data based on usual place of residence, the reported population of the locality will not include those people staying in the holiday homes on a short-term basis.

== Education ==
There are no schools in Stockyard. The nearest government primary school is Byfield State School in neighbouring Byfield to the east. The nearest government secondary school is Yeppoon State High School in Yeppoon to the south. There are also non-government schools in Yeppoon and its suburbs.
