= Stockyard, Queensland =

Stockyard, Queensland may refer to:

- Stockyard, Queensland (Lockyer Valley), Australia
- Stockyard, Queensland (Livingstone Shire), Australia
