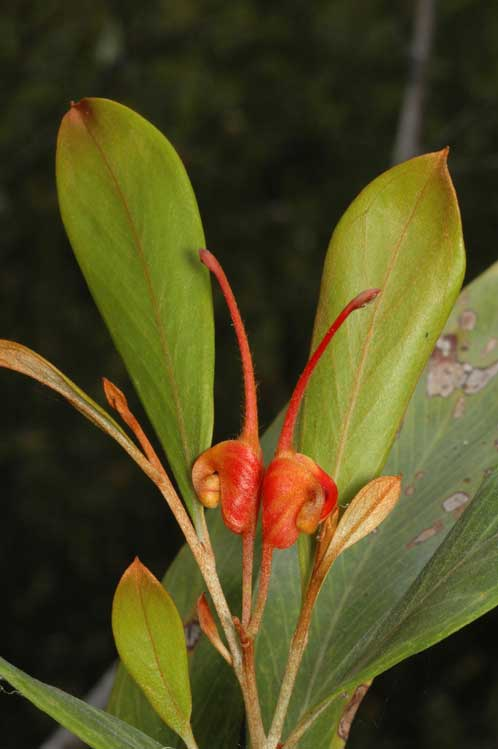
- In the Hunter Region Botanic Gardens

Conservation status
- Near Threatened (IUCN 3.1)

- Vulnerable (EPBC Act)

Scientific classification
- Kingdom: Plantae
- Clade: Embryophytes
- Clade: Tracheophytes
- Clade: Angiosperms
- Clade: Eudicots
- Order: Proteales
- Family: Proteaceae
- Genus: Grevillea
- Species: G. glossadenia

Binomial name
- Grevillea glossadenia McGill.

= Grevillea glossadenia =

Species of shrub endemic to Queensland, Australia

Grevillea glossadenia is a species of flowering plant in the family Proteaceae and is endemic to Queensland, in northeastern Australia. It is an erect shrub with more or less elliptic leaves and deep yellow-orange to orange-red flowers.

== Description ==
Grevillea glossdenia is a shrub that typically grows to a height of 1–2 m (3 ft 3 in – 6 ft 7 in). Its leaves are more or less elliptic, 50–120 mm (2.0–4.7 in) long and 20–35 mm (0.79–1.38 in) wide with the edges curved downwards and slightly wavy. The lower surface of the leaves is silky-hairy. The flowers are arranged in small clusters in leaf axils or the ends of branches along a rachis up to 15 mm (0.59 in) long and are deep yellow-orange to orange-red, the pistil 26–32 mm (1.0–1.3 in) long and the style orange to reddish. Flowering in most months but mainly from April to August and the fruit is an oval follicle 10–14 mm (0.39–0.55 in) long.

== Taxonomy ==
Grevillea glossadenia was first formally described in 1975 by Donald McGillivray in the journal Telopea from plant material collected by Bernard Hyland from near Bakerville (near Irvinebank) in 1972.

== Distribution and habitat ==
This grevillea grows in woodland or open forest mainly between Walkamin, Irvinbank and Herberton.

== Conservation status ==
Grevillea glossadenia is currently listed as near threatened on the IUCN Red List of Threatened Species. This is due to its limited known extent of occurrence and current decline in habitat quality from mining operations and increased fire regimes. Despite these threats, the population is not severely fragmented and appears stable at present.

This species is also listed as vulnerable under the Environment Protection and Biodiversity Conservation Act 1999 and the Queensland Government Nature Conservation Act 1992.

== Cultivation ==
Grevillea glossadenia is cultivated as an ornamental plant. It is suitable for use in small gardens as a shrub or small tree, where it grows readily in a sunny position with good drainage. It is frost hardy and tolerates humidity. The cultivar Grevillea 'Orange Marmalade' was produced by crossing this species with Grevillea venusta.
