= Weerriba, Queensland =

Weerriba
- Suburb
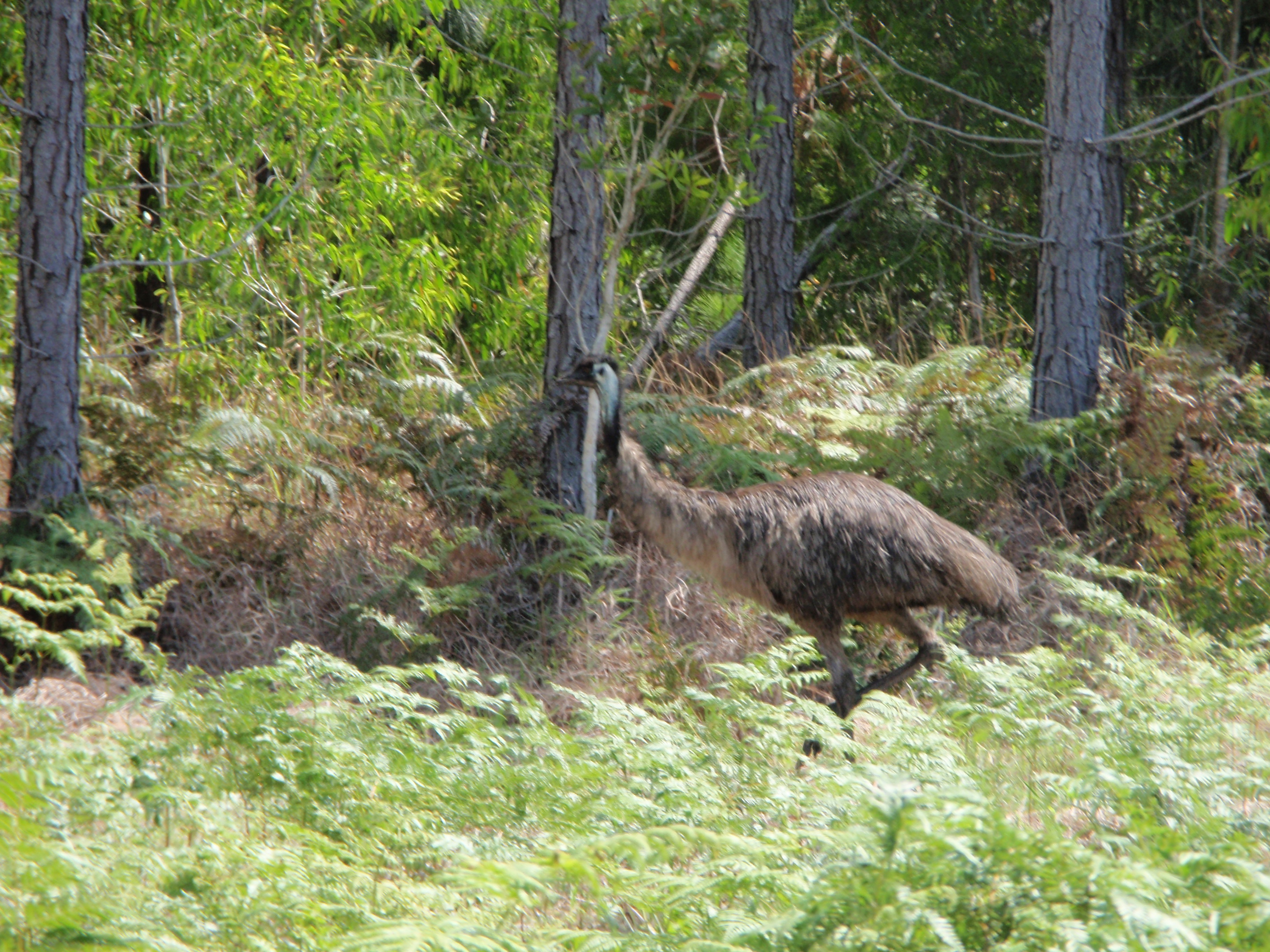
- Emu in Weerriba, 2011

- Interactive map of Weerriba
- Coordinates: 22.7938°S 150.6730°E
- Country: Australia
- State: Queensland
- LGA: Livingstone Shire
- Location: 40.6 km (25.2 mi) N of Yeppoon; 77.5 km (48.2 mi) NNE of Rockhampton; 716 km (445 mi) NNW of Brisbane

Government
  - State electorate: Keppel
  - Federal division: Capricornia

Area
  - Total: 85.0 km^{2} (32.8 sq mi)

Population
  - Total: 0 (2021 census)
  - Density: 0.000/km^{2} (0.000/sq mi)
- Time zone: UTC+10:00 (AEST)
- Postcode: 4703
Suburbs around Weerriba
Shoalwater	Shoalwater	Stockyard
Shoalwater	Weerriba	Stockyard
Shoalwater	Byfield	Stockyard

Weerriba is a rural locality in the Livingstone Shire, Queensland, Australia. In the 2021 census, Weerriba had "no people or a very low population".

== Geography ==
Water Park Creek enters from the north-west and flows through to form part of the southern boundary. Sandy Creek, a tributary of Water Park Creek, forms the south-eastern boundary.

The locality is within the Byfield State Forest and the land use is a mixture of plantation forestry and production forestry.

== Demographics ==
In the 2016 census, Weerriba had "no people or a very low population".

In the 2021 census, Weerriba had "no people or a very low population".

== Education ==
There are no schools in Weerriba. The nearest government primary school is Byfield State School in neighbouring Byfield to the south. The nearest government schools is Yeppoon State High School in Yeppoon to the south. There are also non-government schools in Yeppoon and its suburbs.
