= Stockyard Point, Queensland =

Stockyard Point
- Town
- Coordinates: 22.8141°S 150.8061°E
- Country: Australia
- State: Queensland
- LGA: Livingstone Shire
- Location: 59.6 km (37.0 mi) NNE of Yeppoon; 96.5 km (60.0 mi) NNE of Rockhampton; 726 km (451 mi) NNW of Brisbane

Government
  - State electorate: Keppel
  - Federal division: Capricornia
- Time zone: UTC+10:00 (AEST)
- Postcode: 4703

Stockyard Point is a coastal town in the Livingstone Shire, Queensland, Australia. It is within the locality of Stockyard.

== History ==
The town was named by the Queensland Place Names Board on 5 January 1970.

== Education ==
There are no schools in Stockyard Point. The nearest government primary school is Byfield State School in neighbouring Byfield to the east. The nearest government secondary school is Yeppoon State High School in Yeppoon to the south. There are also non-government schools in Yeppoon and its suburbs.

== Flora ==
- Androcalva perkinsiana (headland commersonia) a critically endangered native species which is only known to occur at stockyard point.
