= Orange Marmalade =

Orange Marmalade may refer to:

- Orange marmalade, a marmalade made from oranges
- Orange Marmalade (webtoon), a South Korean webtoon
- Orange Marmalade (TV series), a South Korean drama series based on the webtoon
- Grevillea 'Orange Marmalade', a plant cultivar
