= Grevillea 'Orange Marmalade' =

Flowering plant cultivar

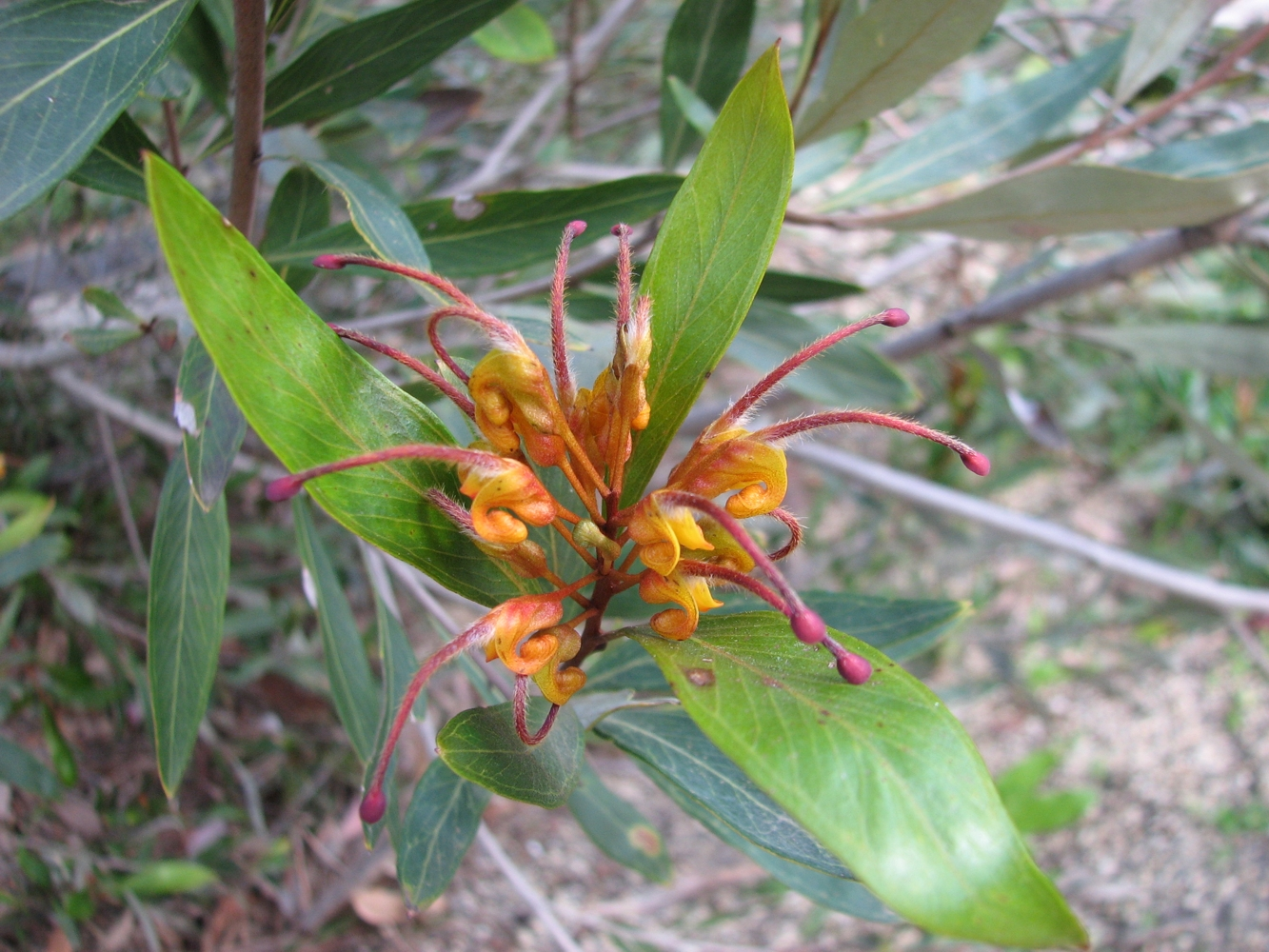
- Hybrid parentage: Grevillea glossadenia × Grevillea venusta
- Cultivar: 'Orange Marmalade'
- Origin: Selected in Queensland

Grevillea 'Orange Marmalade' is a grevillea cultivar. It is a cross between G. glossadenia and G. venusta.

== See also ==
- List of Grevillea cultivars
