= Stanage, Queensland =

Stanage
- Town
- Interactive map of Stanage
- Coordinates: 22.1352°S 150.0425°E
- Country: Australia
- State: Queensland
- LGA: Livingstone Shire
- Location: 127 km (79 mi) NNE of Marlborough; 173 km (107 mi) N of Rockhampton; 192 km (119 mi) NNW of Yeppoon; 812 km (505 mi) NNW of Brisbane

Government
  - State electorate: Mirani
  - Federal division: Capricornia

Area
  - Total: 3,339.6 km^{2} (1,289.4 sq mi)

Population
  - Total: 78 (2021 census)
  - Density: 0.02336/km^{2} (0.0605/sq mi)
- Time zone: UTC+10:00 (AEST)
- Postcode: 4702
Localities around Stanage
Coral Sea	The Percy Group	Coral Sea
Ogmore	Stanage	Shoalwater
Marlborough	Kunwarara	Shoalwater

Stanage is a coastal rural town and locality in the Livingstone Shire, Queensland, Australia. In the 2021 census, the locality of Stanage had a population of 78 people.

== Geography ==
Stanage is at the head of the Torilla Peninsula (22.4236°S 150.1116°E) jutting north into the Coral Sea with Broad Sound to the west and Shoalwater Bay to the east. The town is on the northernmost tip of the peninsula split across three areas of housing, one on the north-west side of the tip facing Thirsty Sound and two on the north-east side. The area is a popular weekend retreat from Rockhampton and offers fishing and crabbing.

On the eastern Shoalwater Bay side of the peninsula are six disconnected sections of land collectively constituting the Shoalwater Conservation Park.

Apart from the residential areas of the town and the conservation park, the remainder of the land within locality is used for grazing on native vegetation.

=== Mainland coastal features ===
Having such a large coast, there are many named headlands and other coastal features including:

- Arthur Point is a point (22.1263°S 150.0439°E)
- Broome Head is a cape (22.2666°S 150.15°E)
- Island Bluff is a cliff (22.3236°S 149.9163°E)
- Macdonald Point is a point (22.3333°S 150.2°E)
- Pier Head is a cape (22.1075°S 150.0386°E)
- Stanage Point is a point (22.1511°S 150.0794°E).

=== Mountains ===
There are also a number of named mountains:

- Campbell Peak is a peak (22.2630°S 150.0375°E)
- Corisande Hills is a hill (22.1772°S 150.0666°E)
- Fort Cope is a mountain (22.3688°S 149.9733°E)
- Jessie Peak is a peak (22.1916°S 150.0319°E)
- Price Mountain is a mountain (22.2161°S 149.9783°E)
- Roger Hills is a mountain range (22.25°S 150.1°E)
- The Gemini is a mountain (22.4530°S 150.0544°E)
- Torilla Hill is a hill (22.3752°S 150.0588°E)

=== Islands and island features ===
The extent of the locality extends into the Coral Sea and incorporates many island groups and individual islands and rocks:

==== Island groups ====
- Cannibal Group is an island group (22.21°S 150.3302°E)
  - Annie Island is an island (22.2312°S 150.2870°E)
  - Collins Island is an island (22.2406°S 150.3106°E)
  - Eliza Island is an island (22.2363°S 150.2890°E)
  - Holt Island is an island (22.2064°S 150.3732°E)
  - Lingham Island is an island (22.2281°S 150.2687°E)
  - Mumford Island is an island (22.1886°S 150.3589°E)
- Duke Islands is an island group (21.9669°S 150.1336°E)
  - Bamborough Island is an island (21.9254°S 150.1133°E)
  - Coquet Island is an island (21.9387°S 150.0988°E)
  - Eagle Islet (21.9781°S 150.194722°E)
  - Hunter Island is an island (21.9677°S 150.1433°E)
    - Quarry Point is a point (21.9666°S 150.15°E)
  - Marble Island is an island (21.9846°S 150.1721°E)
  - Morkar Islet is an island (21.9693°S 150.1556°E)
  - Tynemouth Island is an island (21.9953°S 150.1314°E)
- North Point Isles is an island group (22.0169°S 149.8502°E)
  - Bush Island is an island (21.9956°S 149.8942°E)
  - Falcon Island (21.9803°S 149.8786°E)
  - Infelix Islets is an island group (22.025°S 149.83°E)
  - Turn Island is an island (21.9874°S 149.8111°E)
  - Wild Duck Island is an island (22.0027°S 149.8625°E)
    - Cliff Head is a cape (22.0000°S 149.85°E)

==== Individual islands, cays and rocks ====
- Alnwick Island is an island (22.0133°S 150.3852°E)
- Barren Island is an island (22.0360°S 149.9727°E)
- Black Swan Rock is a rock (22.0388°S 149.9998°E)
- Coal Island is an island (22.1466°S 149.8670°E)
- Comet Rock is a rock (22.0724°S 149.8753°E)
- Danger Island is an island (22.0124°S 150.1641°E)
- Double Rocks is a rock (22.0867°S 150.0040°E)
- Five Trees Cay is a cay (22.2300°S 150.3349°E)
- Gannet Rock is a rock (22.0549°S 149.8785°E)
- Hexham Island is an island (22.0187°S 150.3676°E)
- Iron Islet is an island (21.9835°S 150.1544°E)
- Long Island is an island (22.1278°S 149.9052°E)
  - North Point is a point (22.05°S 149.9°E)
  - Southport Hill is a hill (22.1063°S 149.9099°E)
- Low Island is an island (22.0463°S 150.0982°E)
- Mangrove Island is an island (22.2587°S 149.8856°E)
- Narrows Rock is a rock (22.1227°S 149.9422°E)
- North Point Cays is a cay (22.0395°S 149.8121°E)
- North Rock is a rock (22.1820°S 150.3558°E)
- Otterbourne Island is an island (22.0250°S 150.2936°E)
- Quail Island is an island (22.1359°S 149.9796°E)
  - Lucy Ravel Point is a point (22.1016°S 150.0111°E)
- Race Rocks is a rock (21.9863°S 149.8505°E)
- Shields Island is an island (22.0013°S 150.3802°E)
- South Barren Island is an island (22.0559°S 149.9893°E)
- Steep Island is an island (22.0469°S 150.4561°E)
- Table Rock is a rock (22.0312°S 150.3005°E)
- Tail Rock is a rock (22.1026°S 149.8621°E)
- Ten Pin Rock is a rock (22.2037°S 150.3513°E)
- Tide Island is an island (22.1380°S 149.9402°E)
- Till Rock is a rock (21.9559°S 150.1505°E)
- Two Round Rocks is a rock (22.0383°S 150.1007°E)
- West Side Island is an island (22.1475°S 149.8505°E)
- White Rocks is a rock (22.2051°S 150.2512°E)
- Woods Island is an island (22.4709°S 149.9043°E)

=== Marine features ===
The extension into the Coral Sea also includes a number of marine features:

- Broad Sound Channel is a channel (22.1°S 150.25°E)
- Burkitt Roads is an anchorage (22.0828°S 149.8796°E)
- Connor Banks is a marine bank (22.1833°S 149.8333°E)
- Crooked Sands is a marine bank (21.9666°S 150.1166°E)
- Curlew Sand is a marine bank (22.1°S 149.9833°E)
- Long Bank is a marine bank (22.25°S 149.8166°E)
- Middle Passage is a passage (22.15°S 149.9333°E)
- North Channel is a channel (22.2166°S 150.3833°E)
- North Point Passage is a passage (22.0333°S 149.8833°E)
- North West Channel is a channel (22.2666°S 150.2333°E)
- Pearl Passage is a channel (22.05°S 149.9833°E)
- Race Passage is a passage (22.0000°S 149.8333°E)
- Sand Bank Bay is a bay (22.1170°S 149.9455°E)
- Stanage Bay is a bay (22.1494°S 150.0688°E)
- Thirsty Sound is a sound (22.1666°S 149.9666°E)

== History ==
Stanage was created on 15 July 1989 to include the former localities of Plumtree, Alligator Bay and Alligator Point. The name refers to Stanage Park, an estate in Radnorshire, Wales owned by the Coltman Rogers family, who were involved in Torilla pastoral run from 1860.

== Demographics ==
In the 2016 census, the locality of Stanage had a population of 83 people.

In the 2021 census, the locality of Stanage had a population of 78 people.

== Amenities ==
There is a volunteer-run library supported by the Livingstone Shire Council.

There is a public boat ramp at Banksia Road (22.1369°S 150.0313°E).

== Education ==
There are no schools in Stanage. The nearest government primary school is Marlborough State School in neighbouring Marlborough, 128 kilometres (80 mi) to the south-west. The nearest government secondary schools are in Rockhampton, 173 kilometres (107 mi) to the south, so distance education and boarding schools are the alternatives.
