= Shoalwater, Queensland =

Shoalwater
- Suburb
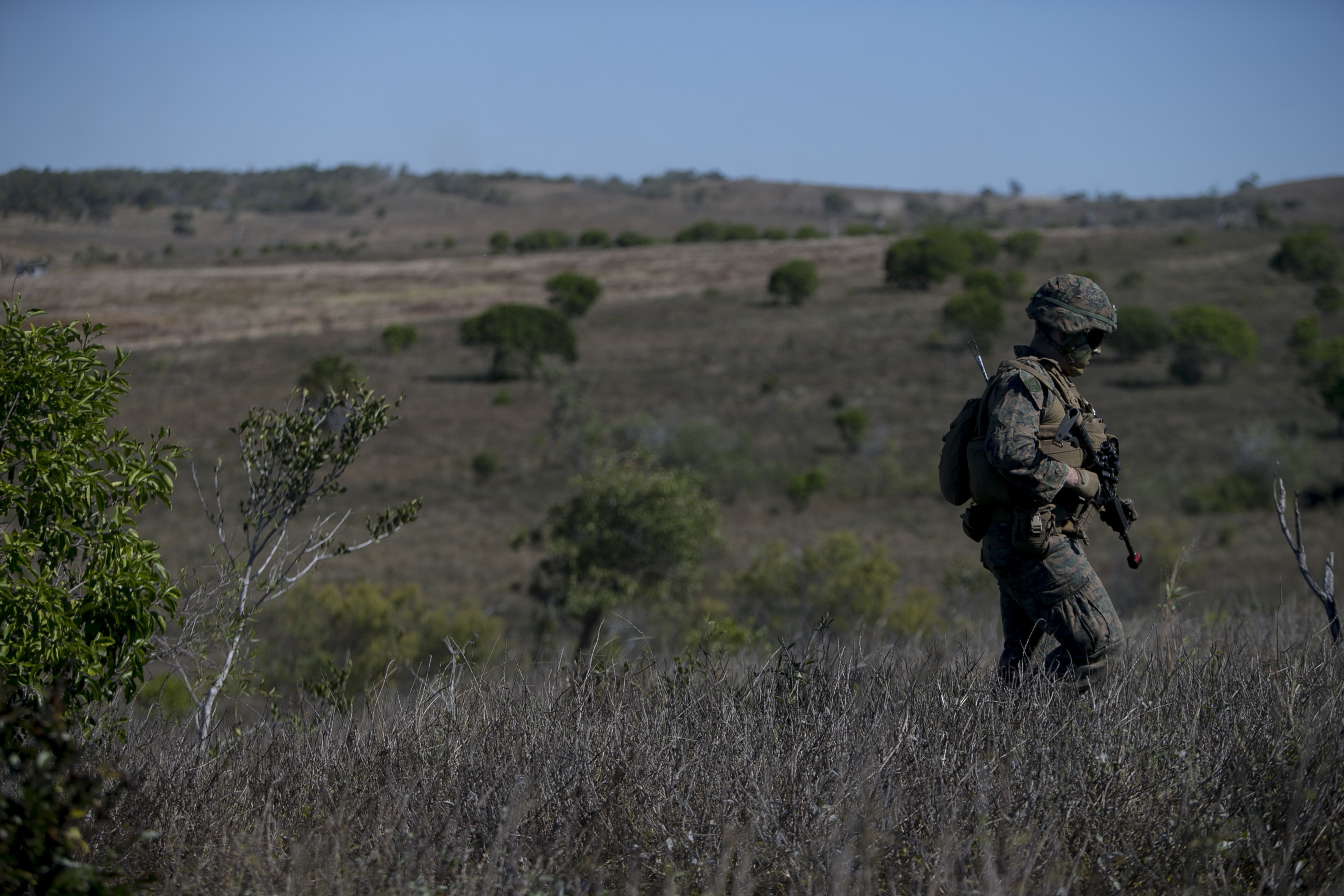
- Military training, 2019

- Interactive map of Shoalwater
- Coordinates: 22.5230°S 150.5108°E
- Country: Australia
- State: Queensland
- LGA: Livingstone Shire
- Location: 58.2 km (36.2 mi) N of Yeppoon; 95.3 km (59.2 mi) NNE of Rockhampton; 743 km (462 mi) NNW of Brisbane

Government
  - State electorates: Keppel; Mirani
  - Federal division: Capricornia

Area
  - Total: 4,529.7 km^{2} (1,748.9 sq mi)

Population
  - Total: 0 (2021 census)
  - Density: 0.00000/km^{2} (0.00000/sq mi)
- Postcode: 4702
Suburbs around Shoalwater
Stanage	Coral Sea	Coral Sea
Stanage	Shoalwater	Coral Sea
Kunwarara	Canal Creek; Byfield	Weerriba; Stockyard

Shoalwater is a coastal locality in the Livingstone Shire, Queensland, Australia. In the 2021 census, Shoalwater had "no people or a very low population".

== Geography ==
This large locality includes the mainland with a large peninsula and a number of islands extending in the Coral Sea. The bay between the mainland and the peninsula is Shoalwater Bay. There are a number of mountain ranges, mountains and headlands.

The Shoalwater Bay Military Training Area occupies most of the locality. The remaining land use is marshland or grazing on native vegetation.

== Demographics ==
In the 2016 census, Shoalwater had "no people or a very low population".

In the 2021 census, Shoalwater had "no people or a very low population".

== Education ==
There are no schools in Shoalwater. The nearest government primary schools are Byfield State School in neighbouring Byfield to the south and Marlborough State School in Marlborough to the south-west. The nearest government secondary school is Yeppoon State High School.in Yeppoon to the south-east, but it would be too distant from most parts of the locality with the alternatives being distance education and boarding school.
