= Shoalwater Bay Military Training Area =

Military training area in Queensland, Australia

- United States Navy landing craft at the Shoalwater Bay Training Area, 2013

- Location within Queensland
- 22.5479°S 150.4873°E
- Location: Byfield Road, Byfield, Shire of Livingstone, Queensland, Australia

Commonwealth Heritage List
- Official name: Shoalwater Bay Military Training Area
- Type: Listed place (Natural)
- Designated: 22 June 2004
- Reference no.: 105545

The Shoalwater Bay Military Training Area is a heritage-listed military installation at Byfield Road, Byfield, Shire of Livingstone, Queensland, Australia. It is a large, relatively undisturbed and intact natural system with a wide variety of coastal landforms and a high level of biodiversity. It contains a diverse range of marine and coastal wetland landscapes, vegetation types and ecosystems. It was added to the Australian Commonwealth Heritage List on 22 June 2004.

== Description ==
Shoalwater Bay Military Training Area is approximately 454,500 hectares (1,123,000 acres), 4 kilometres (2.5 mi) north-west of Byfield.

The main geomorphic units comprise hilly to mountainous terrain, aeolian sand dunes, undulating and rolling terrain and flat areas of riverine alluvium. The permutations of geomorphological, pedological and microclimatic environments support diverse vegetation types, for which 58 floristic communities have been recognised within 13 structural forms. Rainfall decreases markedly westwards and sharp vegetational gradients exist. Eucalypt forest and woodland, heath and mangroves occupy most of the area, with isolated patches of rainforest on sheltered steep slopes and swamp communities in the sand dunes in the east of the place. Themeda and Heteropogon are the most common and widespread grass genera.

The eastern shoreline largely consists of long sandy beaches and small rocky headlands, behind which rise the high and generally linear sand dunes of Cape Manifold and Freshwater. To the north is an intricate pattern of tidal mudflats and shoals, with several offshore islands, steep rocky reefs, the bays of Port Clinton and Shoalwater, large seagrass beds, inlets and estuaries of several creeks, which support large areas of mangroves. The place contains approximately 140 square kilometres (15 sq mi) of mangrove communities including 18 of the 39 mangrove species occurring in Australia.

Creeks and swamps represent the freshwater systems of the place. Virtually all freshwater swamps are located in or adjacent to the sand dunes. The largest swamp in the sand dunes is Freshwater Swamp but there are many along Freshwater and Clinton Peninsulas and in the beach ridge formation within Port Clinton. The water table in most of the swamps is maintained by sea level but several swamps above 60 metres elevation around Dismal Swamp are supported by the development of impervious layers within the sand.

The high tidal variation gives rise to extensive mudflats and provides extensive feeding and roosting grounds for both migrant and non-migrant sea and shore birds. Species of migratory birds that were recorded as abundant on the tidal mudflats of Shoalwater Bay during the summer of 1991–1992 include the lesser golden plover (Pluvialis fulva), bar-tailed godwit (Limosa limosa), whimbrel (Numenius madagascariensis), grey-tailed tattler (Tringa brevipes,) red-necked stint (Calidris ruficollis), terek sandpiper (Xenus cinereus), great knot (Calidris tenuirostris), and the fork-tailed swift (Apus pacificus).

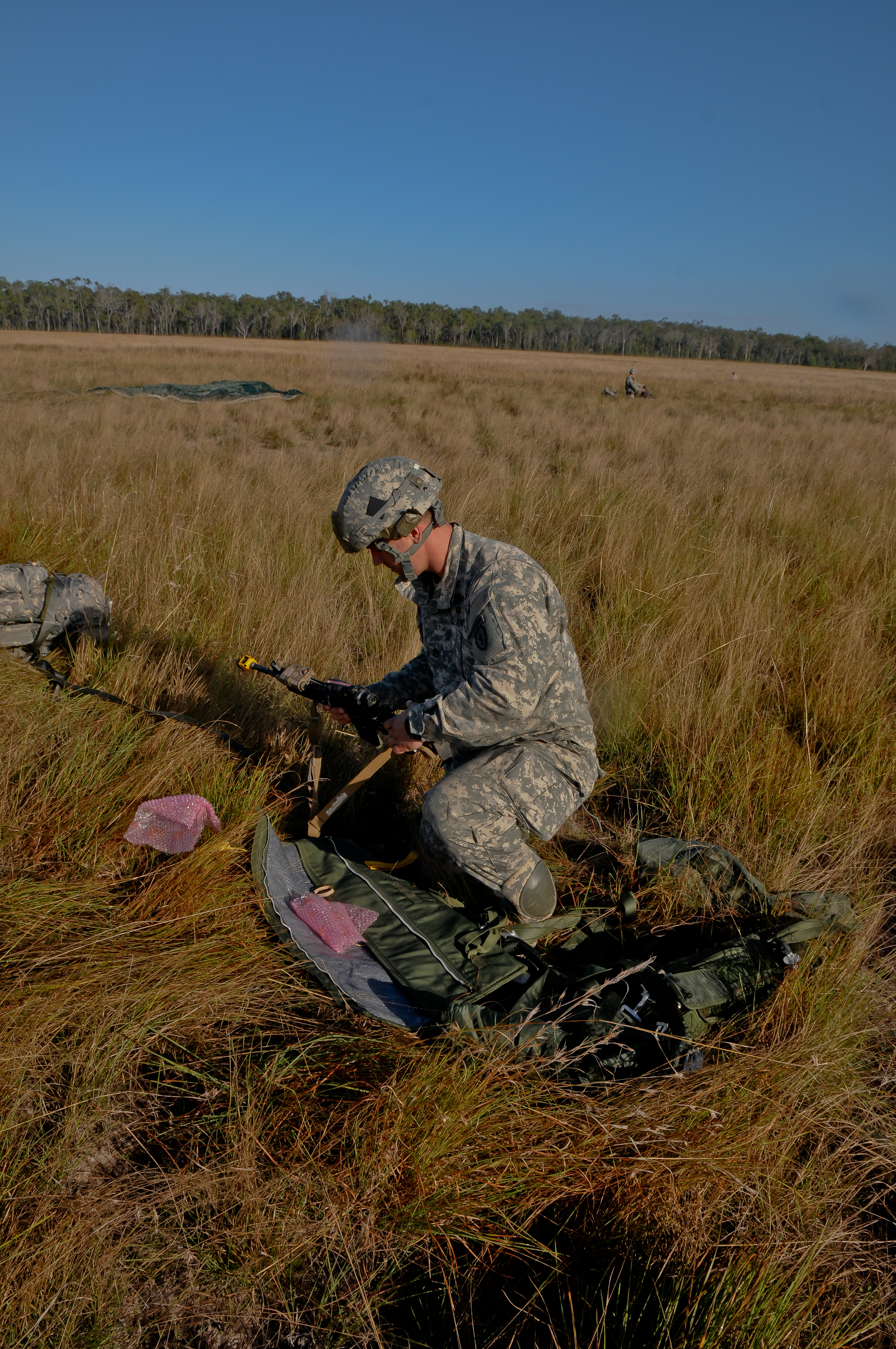
Airborne jump onto grassy plains, 2013

Low hills and flat to gently undulating plains lie behind the tidal communities of the north and west. Woodlands of broad-leaved paperbark (Melaleuca viridiflora and Melaleuca nervosa) occur on the plains and depressions, with grey ironbark (Eucalyptus drepanophylla) and Queensland peppermint (Eucalyptus exserta) in areas with some relief and drainage. Kangaroo grass (Themeda triandra, Themeda australis) and spear grasses (Heteropogon triticeus, Heteropogon contortus) are the dominant ground storey species.

A series of mountain ranges that strike generally SE-NW across the place are the main physiographic features to affect rainfall gradients. The coastal mountains produce only local orographic effects about the peaks, whereas the western series of ranges represents a major orographic division between the coastal and western plains. The resultant steep rainfall gradient, from 1,800 millimetres (71 in) in the east to 900, in the west, together with the diverse landforms contributes to the high biodiversity recorded in the place. The alluvial fans and plains to the west of the ranges support eucalypt and melaleuca woodlands in which poplar box (Eucalyptus populnea), or white box (Eucalyptus platyphylla) are dominant. To the east of the main ranges lies the Peninsula Range, which rises steeply to 500 metres along the Clinton Peninsula and borders an extensive system of high sand dunes. Eucalypt forest and stands of hoop pine Araucaria cunninghamiioccur on the range, while heaths with emergent eucalypts and acacias dominate the dune system. The dunefields have a history extending well over 100 000 years, and have probably been formed from sand supplied by the Fitzroy River. The dunefields contain a wide range of constructional and erosional landforms, including relict parabolic dunes, large active elongate parabolic dunes, inter-dune corridors, inter-dune sandplains, lakes, swamps, steams, beach ridges and swales.

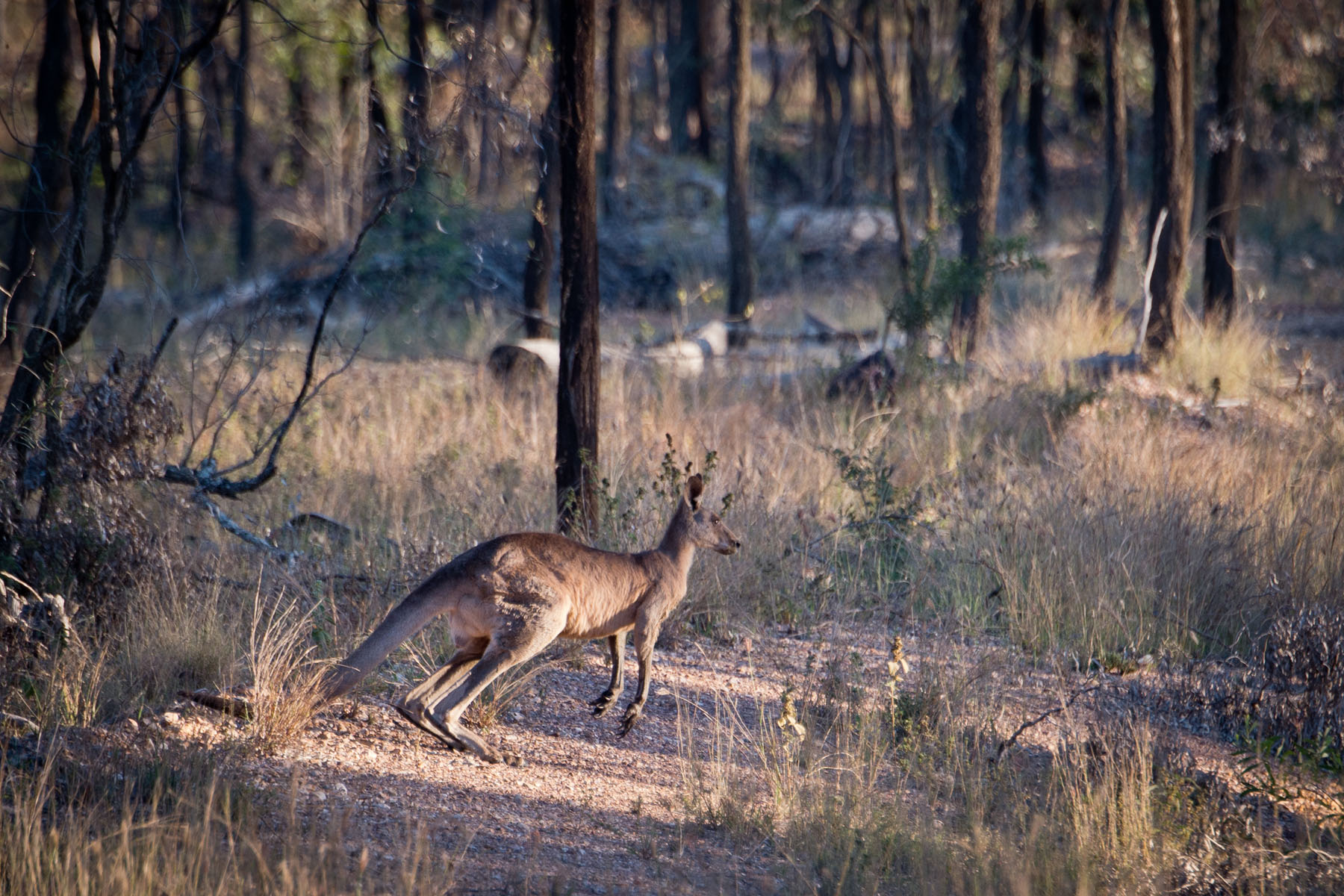
Kangaroo in the Shoalwater Bay Military Training Area, 2015

The terrestrial fauna of the place is diverse with approximately one third of the Australian mainland birds and bat species represented and approximately one quarter of the macropod species (including kangaroos and wallabies). The amphibian fauna is representative of north-eastern Australia and is moderately diverse in containing 12 percent of the Australian species. Most species of frogs were recorded on the western plains. This reflects the requirement for seasonal ponds for breeding and an intolerance to salt spray. Sixty-four reptile species are recorded which represents around 10 percent of Australian native species and include members of all families of land and freshwater reptiles.

There are more than 30 islands and small inlets in the place and many have fringing reefs with coral cover varying from 7 to 66 percent. Surveys of the fringing reefs in Shoalwater Bay indicate that reefs in the place generally consist of broken rocky shores or rubble banks, which may be covered by algae, corals and/or seagrasses. The bottled-nosed dolphin, the Indo-Pacific dolphin, the Irrawaddy dolphin and the humpback whale are known to occur within the marine waters of the place.

=== Condition ===
The majority of the place is in an excellent condition and the current use of the place for military training does not appear to have a cumulative adverse impact on conservation values with impacts generally intermittent and localised.

A number of weed species occur in the place and most are colonisers of bare ground. Most require disturbance for their establishment and only a few are capable of establishing within intact native vegetation. Exceptions include lantana, rubber vine, and prickly pear. Parthenium weed has been found in a small area near Mout Pine and considerable effort is being made to eradicate it from the Training Area. A number of feral animals occur within the place including horses, cattle, pigs, rabbits, cane toads, goats and foxes. Most occur in low numbers and control measures have been implemented to contain populations at low levels.

A fire management plan has been developed to address the requirements for safety, military training, and conservation. The main requirements are to limit the occurrence of extensive, high intensity burns, and the occurrence of late season burns.

Around 7 percent of the land within the place, predominantly eucalypt or eucalypt/melaleuca woodland, was cleared previously for grazing purposes. Most of the vegetation has since regenerated. Condition reviewed October 2001.

== Heritage listing ==
The Shoalwater Bay Military Training Area represents the largest coastal wilderness between Nadgee in southern New South Wales and the Cape Melville/Starcke Holding Area on Cape York Peninsula.The place is significant in demonstrating a range of coastal, sub-coastal and aquatic landscapes and ecosystems, which occur in a relatively natural state and which generally, exhibit a high degree of integrity and diversity. As such, the place is of national importance to the maintenance and demonstration of geomorphological, ecological and biological processes of the coastal and coastal hinterland environment.

The place is of geomorphological significance as an example of the evolution of sandy landscapes in the humid tropics/sub-tropics and contains some of the finest examples on the Queensland coast of a variety of relict parabolic dunes, inter-dune sand plains, dunes on tombolo barriers and strand plains. Shoalwater Bay contains landforms of undisturbed depositional sequences resulting from the action of wind (dunes) and water (beach ridges). These dune systems are of great significance in the understanding the evolution of aeolian dunes in eastern Australia during the Quaternary. These dune systems differ from other coastal and island sand masses in Queensland in that they demonstrate fewer episodes of instability and contain a much lower number of perched lakes. The old beach ridges and terraces in the Clinton Lowlands portion of the place are important for understanding coastline evolution in the last 6000 years.

The place's biodiversity value lies in the assemblage of species rather than with the number of species. The diversity of geomorphology and climatic gradients has resulted in a complex mixture of vegetation in a relatively small area. Unusual plant associations are demonstrated in the gradation from the wet coastal forests in the east of the place to the semi-arid tree species of poplar box (Eucalyptus populnea), bulloak (Allocasuarina luehmanniiand), and Melaleuca spp on the dry ridges occurring above the seasonally waterlogged valleys and swamp communities in the western portion of the place. The presence of stands of the semi-arid poplar box woodland on the beachfront just above the normal high tide range is an uncommon occurrence.

The high diversity of landscape types, the steep climatic gradient, and place's location near the junction of the Central Mackay Coast, Brigalow Belt Northern and Brigalow Belt South biogeographic regions accounts for the high numbers of plant, animal and fish species and sub-species that are at, or near, their known southern or northern distribution limits. The place is the northern limit of the wallum wet heath community and is within the transition zone between the tropics and sub-tropics. Shoalwater Bay thus provides important habitat for many species that are regionally endemic and supports the view that the place is a refugium that has allowed the survival of plants and animals that were far more widespread in the evolutionary past. The place is habitat for the Byfield fern (Bowenia serrulata), a cycad and one of two species in this genus. Cycads are an ancient group of plants that have considerable evolutionary significance.

Two hundred and twenty-two species of birds and twenty-three species of bats have been recorded in the place, which represents thirty-two percent and thirty-five percent, respectively, of the total number of Australian species. Two species of sheath-tail bats and four species of wattled bats exemplify the unusually high degree of species co-occurrence that occurs within the place. The place also has comparatively high mammal, macropod and reptile diversity.

The extensive areas of mangroves, seagrass, mud and saltflats are important for maintaining significant regional populations of threatened species of the dugong (Dugong dugon), the green turtle (Chelonia mydas), the hawksbill turtle (Eretmochelys imbricata), and the loggerhead turtle (Caretta caretta). The seagrass beds are the most diverse for seagrass species on the central Queensland coast. The seagrass beds are an important food source for the dugong and green turtle.

The tidal mudflats of the Shoalwater Bay Military Training Area are also important feeding habitat for migratory waders. Flocks of up to 3000 individuals have been recorded, indicating that the place is important in contributing to the ecological diversity of the region. The place also supports the largest breeding colony of pelicans on the East Australian coast.

The high degree of integrity and landscape diversity of the terrestrial and estuarine environments in Shoalwater Bay Military Training Area, together with its steep climatic gradients, combine to form a place that is a significant benchmark area for scientific research. CSIRO has established twenty permanent reference sites within the place with research yielding information with important implications for the management of land in eastern Australia. Research has included studies into marine processes and benchmark monitoring of marine animals; geomorphological and pedological studies to help understand the natural processes of dune formation; ecological studies into progressive and retrogressive succession of plant communities; fire ecology; the effects of rainfall, topographic and other gradients on the distribution of vegetation; and, the interaction of climate, geology, soils and vegetation.

The place is habitat for five nationally threatened plant species and four animal species; examples include the orchid Phaius tancarvilliae and the Byfield matchstick (Comesperma oblongatum). Four animal species considered vulnerable in Queensland also occur in the place including the glossy black cockatoo (Calyphorhynchus lathami erebus), the beach thicknee (Esacus neglectusand) the northern sheath-tailed bat (Taphozous australis).

Shoalwater Bay Military Training Area was listed on the Australian Commonwealth Heritage List on 22 June 2004 having satisfied the following criteria.

Criterion A: Processes

The seagrass beds are also an important food resource of the green turtle (Chelonia mydas). The density of turtles in the area has been estimated at 500 animals per kilometre of low water coastline. This is one of the largest concentrations of this species along the east Australian coast, and Shoalwater Bay is one of the few large shallow waterways in Queensland where turtles are relatively free from the impacts of human activities.

The place supports pockets of Araucarian notophyll vine forest, notophyll vine forest, and littoral (or beach scrub) rainforest. Araucarian notophyll and microphyll vine forests were once the most extensive rainforest community in southern Queensland, but have now been cleared almost entirely.

Criterion B: Rarity

The place is habitat of five nationally vulnerable species: the Byfield matchstick (Comesperma oblongatum), Grevillea venusta, a lily (Sowerbaea subtilis), Quassia bidwillii, the squatter pigeon (Geophaps scripta scripta), and the nationally endangered orchid Phaius tancarvilliae.

Fauna listed as vulnerable in Queensland include; the glossy black cockatoo (Calyptorhynchus lathami), the powerful owl (Ninox strenua), the beach thicknee (Esacus neglectus), and the northern sheath-tail bat (Tapozous australis) .

Shoalwater is also an important habitat for the dugong (Dugong dugon), listed as vulnerable in Queensland, and the nationally vulnerable humpback whale (Megaptera novaeangliae) .

The green turtle (Chelonia mydas), and the hawksbill turtle (Eretmochelys imbricata), both listed as nationally vulnerable, and the nationally endangered loggerhead turtle (Caretta caretta) occur in significant numbers in Shoalwater Bay (C. Limpus 1993 pers. comm.).

The place supports a number of uncommon vegetation gradients, and unusual combinations of species and environment/species associations. This is illustrated in the gradation from the wet coastal forests in the east of the place to the semi-arid tree species of poplar box (Eucalyptus populnea), bulloak (Casuarina leuhmannii) and Melaleuca spp on the dry ridges above seasonally waterlogged valleys and swamp communities in the western portion of the place. What is uncommon is the semi-arid poplar box woodland occurring in stands on the beach front just above normal high tide range. The floating peat mat vegetation found in the swamps is an uncommon vegetation type in Queensland.

Criterion C: Research

The high integrity of much of the Shoalwater Bay Training Area, together with its steep environmental gradients, make Shoalwater Bay a significant benchmark area for scientific research. Research includes: marine processes and benchmark monitoring of marine animals; geomorphological and pedological studies to help understand the natural processes of dune formation; ecological studies into progressive and retrogressive succession of plant communities, fire ecology, the effects of rainfall, topographic and other gradients on the distribution of vegetation, and the interaction of climate, geology, soils and vegetation.

CSIRO has established at least 20 permanent reference sites in the area, and research in the place is yielding information with important implications for the management of land in eastern Australia.
