= Raspberry Creek (Queensland) =

Coordinates: 22.466667°S 150.383333°E

Raspberry Creek is a watercourse in Queensland, Australia, approximately 620 km northwest of the capital Brisbane.
