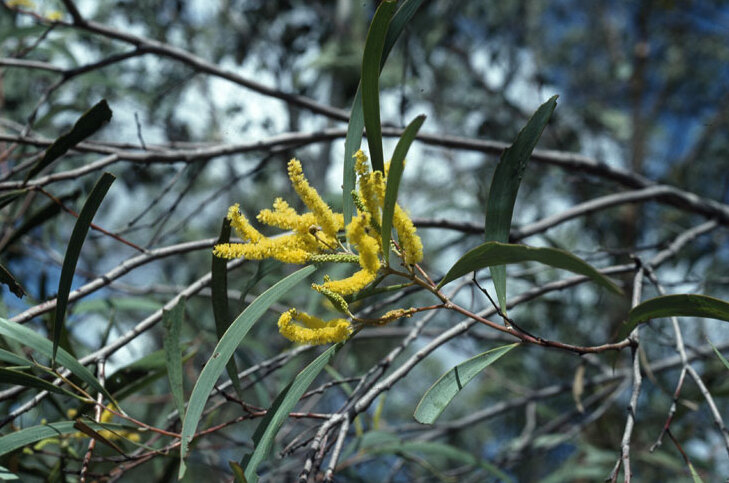
- Subspecies julifera

Scientific classification
- Kingdom: Plantae
- Clade: Embryophytes
- Clade: Tracheophytes
- Clade: Spermatophytes
- Clade: Angiosperms
- Clade: Eudicots
- Clade: Rosids
- Order: Fabales
- Family: Fabaceae
- Subfamily: Caesalpinioideae
- Clade: Mimosoid clade
- Genus: Acacia
- Species: A. julifera

Binomial name
- Acacia julifera Benth.
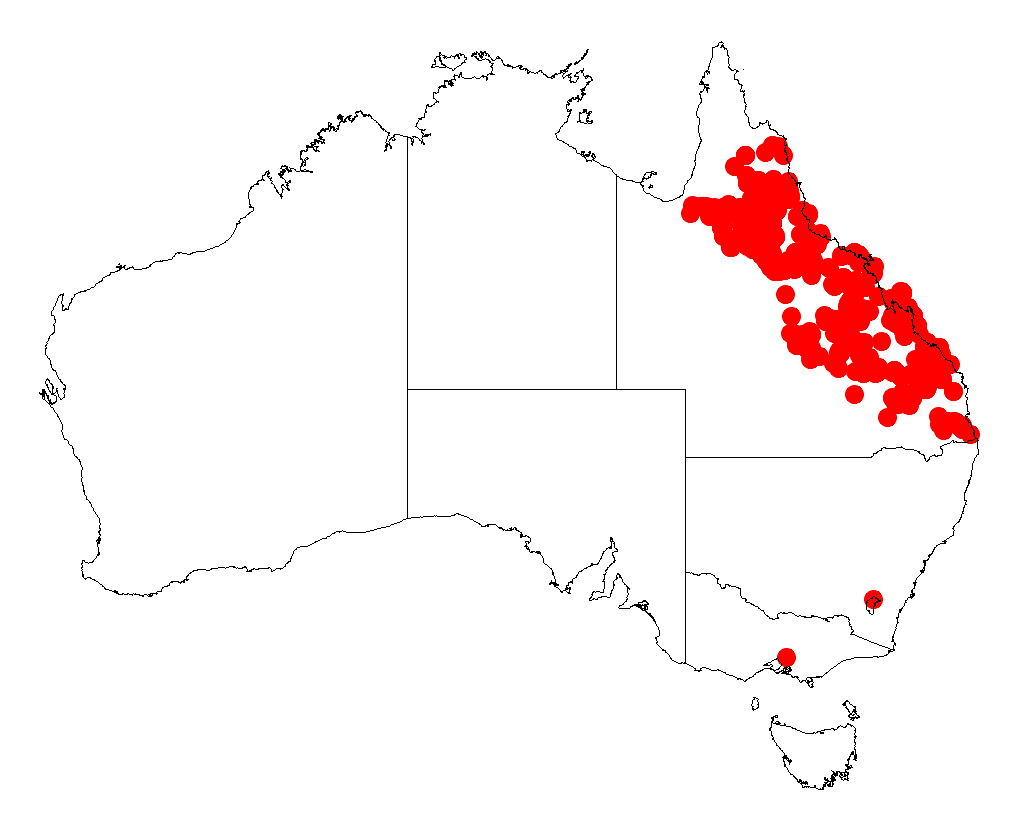
- Occurrence data from AVH

Synonyms
- Acacia holcocarpa Benth.; Racosperma juliferum (Benth.) Pedley

= Acacia julifera =

Species of legume

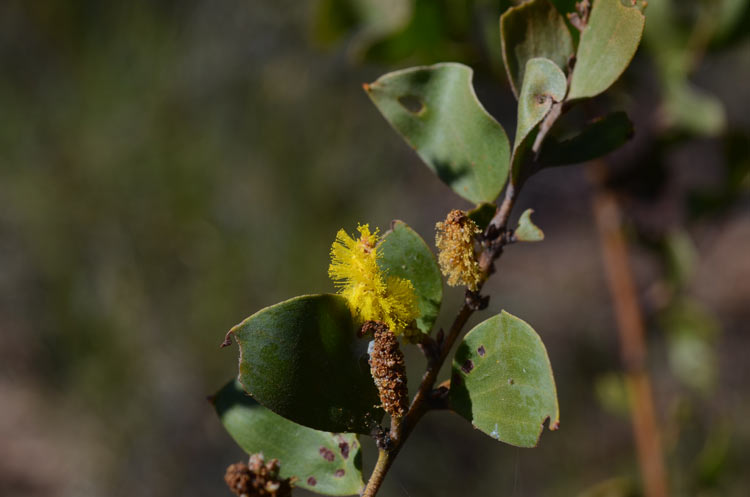
Subspecies curvinervia

Acacia julifera is a species of flowering plant in the family Fabaceae and is endemic to Queensland, Australia. It is a tree or shrub with elliptic or egg-shaped juvenile phyllodes, elliptic or lance-shaped, often sickle-shaped mature phyllodes, spikes of golden yellow flowers and terete pods.

== Description ==
Acacia julifera is a tree up to 7.5 m (25 ft) high, or a shrub to about 3–6 m (9.8–19.7 ft), with reddish, grey-brown or black bark and terete branchlets covered with woolly, soft hairs, but often become glabrous. The juvenile phyllodes are ellipic or egg-shaped with the narrower end towards the base, mature phyllodes are elliptic or lance-shaped, often sickle-shaped, 30–180 mm (1.2–7.1 in) long, 5–33 mm (0.20–1.30 in) wide and leathery with usually three veins more prominent than the rest. The flowers are golden yellow, and usually borne in spikes 20–65 mm (0.79–2.56 in) long in axils. Flowering occurs from March to August, and the pods are terete or subterete, 45–100 mm (1.8–3.9 in) long and 2–5 mm (0.079–0.197 in) wide and obscurely striated. The seeds are oblong or compressed elliptic, 3.0–4.5 mm (0.12–0.18 in) long and brown.

== Taxonomy ==
Acacia julifera was first formally described in 1842 by George Bentham in Hooker's London Journal of Botany from specimens collected by Allan Cunningham near Rodds Bay, Queensland.

In 1978, Leslie Pedley described subspecies gilbertensis in the Austrobaileya and in 1990 described subsp. curvinervia in a later edition of the same journal, and the names and that of the autonym are accepted by the Australian Plant Census:

- Acacia julifera subsp. curvinervia (Maiden) Pedley normally has glabrous or subglabrous, obliquely elliptic mature phyllodes 30–60 mm (1.2–2.4 in) long, 6–16 mm (0.24–0.63 in) wide, spikes 25–30 mm (0.98–1.18 in) long and flowers from May to July.
- Acacia julifera Benth. subsp. julifera (the autonym) normally has glabrous or subglabrous, lance-shaped mature phyllodes 70–170 mm (2.8–6.7 in) long, 5–33 mm (0.20–1.30 in) wide, spikes 30–50 mm (1.2–2.0 in) long and usually flowers in May and June.
- Acacia julifera subsp. gilbertensis Pedley has mature phyllodes that are densely covered in soft, silvery hairs, the phyllodes 70–180 mm (2.8–7.1 in) long, 5–15 mm (0.20–0.59 in) wide, spikes 20–65 mm (0.79–2.56 in) long and flowers from May to August.

The names of two hybrid species are also accepted:

- Acacia julifera subsp. curvinervia × Acacia julifera subsp. julifera
- Acacia julifera × Acacia torulosa

== Distribution and habitat ==
Acacia julifera occurs from the south-east Gulf of Carpentaria through coastal and near-coastal regions of Queensland. There are possible doubtful records from the north coast of New South Wales.

- Subsp. curvinervia grows in yellow earths of stony soils on laterite or trachyte in dense thickets in low woodland between 25°S and 20°30'S, and between 145°30'E and 148°20'E
- Subsp. julifera often grows on sandstone in well-drained, sandy soils in open woodland or grassland from near Forsayth and south to the New South Wales border.
- Subsp. gilbertensis grows on plains or hillsides in sandy, seasonally water-logged soils in scrub, woodland or grassland, and is confined to the upper catchments of the Mitchell, Norman and Gilbert Rivers.

== Conservation status ==
All three subspecies of A. julifera and the two hybrid species, are listed as 'least concern' in the Queensland Government Nature Conservation Act 1992.

== See also ==
- List of Acacia species
