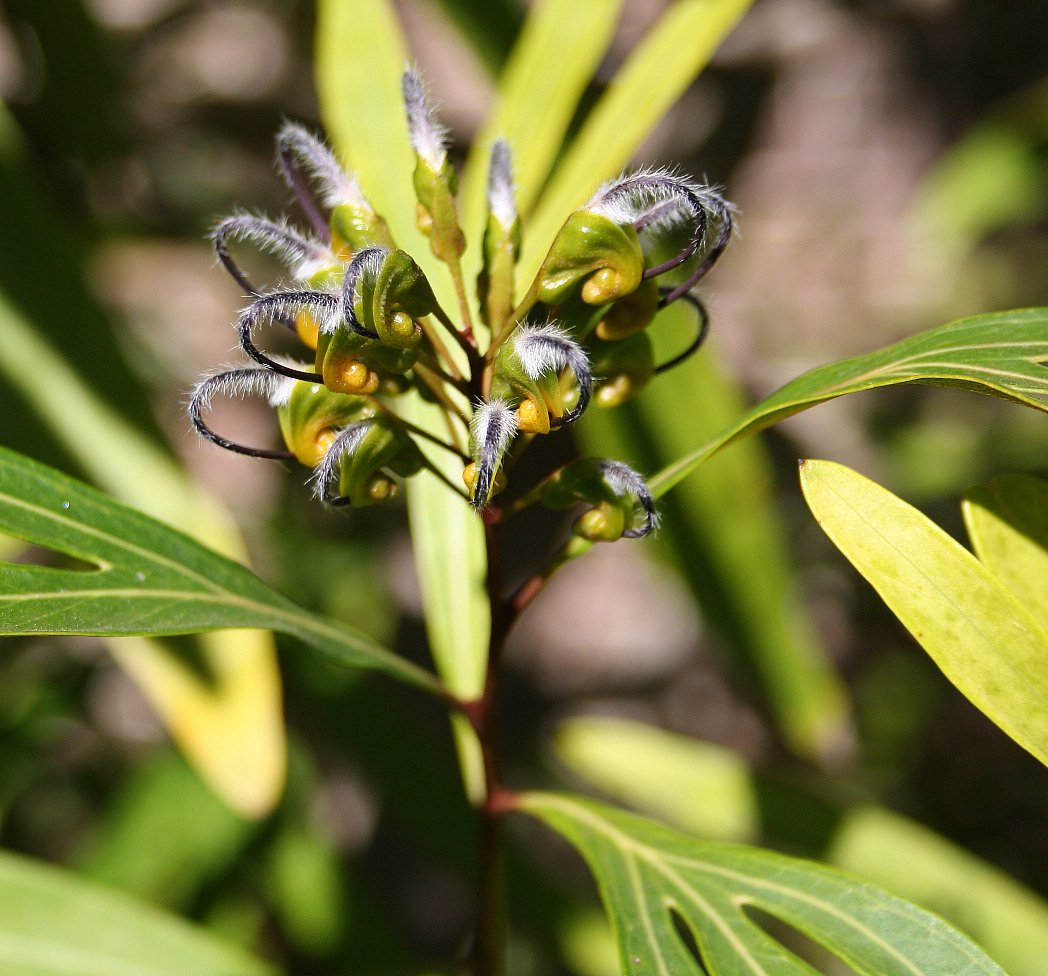
- Young inflorescence

Conservation status
- Endangered (IUCN 3.1)

- Vulnerable (EPBC Act)

Scientific classification
- Kingdom: Plantae
- Clade: Tracheophytes
- Clade: Angiosperms
- Clade: Eudicots
- Order: Proteales
- Family: Proteaceae
- Genus: Grevillea
- Species: G. venusta

Binomial name
- Grevillea venusta R.Br.

= Grevillea venusta =

Species of shrub endemic to Queensland, Australia

Grevillea venusta, commonly known as Byfield spider flower, is a species of flowering plant in the family Proteaceae and is endemic to a small region of central eastern Queensland. It is an erect shrub with simple and/or divided leaves, the leaves or lobes narrowly oblong to narrowly elliptic, and clusters of green and yellow flowers with a deep maroon to purplish black style covered with white hairs.

== Description ==
Grevillea venusta is a large, erect, rounded shrub that typically grows to 4 m (13 ft), or may reach 5 m (16 ft) high and wide, and has branchlets that are brownish and hairy. The leaves are 35–190 mm (1.4–7.5 in) long and 5–20 mm (0.20–0.79 in) wide, sometimes divided with 2 to 7 lobes, the leaves or lobes narrowly elliptic to narrowly oblong. The lower surface of the leaves is silky-hairy. The flowers are borne in loose or more or less cylindrical clusters of 12 to 20 on the ends of branches or in leaf axils on a rachis 50–90 mm (2.0–3.5 in) long. The flowers are rich green and yellow to orange with a deep maroon to purplish black style covered with white hairs, the pistil 30–36 mm (1.2–1.4 in) long. Flowers occur throughout the year with a peak from June to September and the fruit is a greenish, elliptic, shaggy-hairy follicle 16–19 mm (0.63–0.75 in) long.

== Taxonomy ==
Grevillea venusta was first formally described in 1811 by Robert Brown in Transactions of the Linnean Society of London, after he collected the type specimen near Cape Townshend (near Shoalwater Bay) in eastern Queensland in August 1802. The specific epithet is derived from the Latin venustus "charming, lovely or graceful".

== Distribution and habitat ==
Byfield spider flower is restricted to central eastern Queensland where it grows in forest and woodland in rocky places and along creeks between the Many Peaks Range and Shoalwater Bay. It occurs in Byfield and Castle Tower National Parks and the Shoalwater Bay Military Training Area.

== Conservation status ==
Grevillea venusta is listed as "endangered" on the IUCN Red List of Threatened Species. It is also listed as "vulnerable" under the Australian Government Environment Protection and Biodiversity Conservation Act 1999 and the Queensland Government Nature Conservation Act 1992.

== Use in horticulture ==
This species has been cultivated since the early 1970s and is suitable for use in small gardens, where it grows readily in a sunny position with good drainage. It is fast growing and hardy in a sunny, frost-free position.
