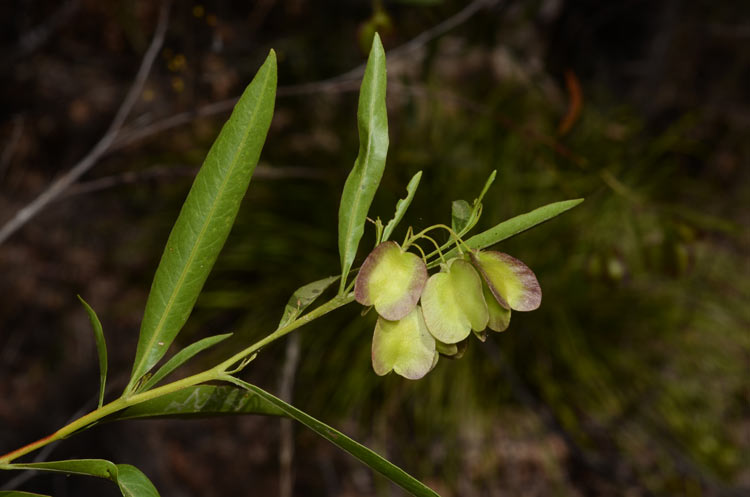

Scientific classification
- Kingdom: Plantae
- Clade: Tracheophytes
- Clade: Angiosperms
- Clade: Eudicots
- Clade: Rosids
- Order: Sapindales
- Family: Sapindaceae
- Genus: Dodonaea
- Species: D. lanceolata

Binomial name
- Dodonaea lanceolata F.Muell.

= Dodonaea lanceolata =

Species of shrub

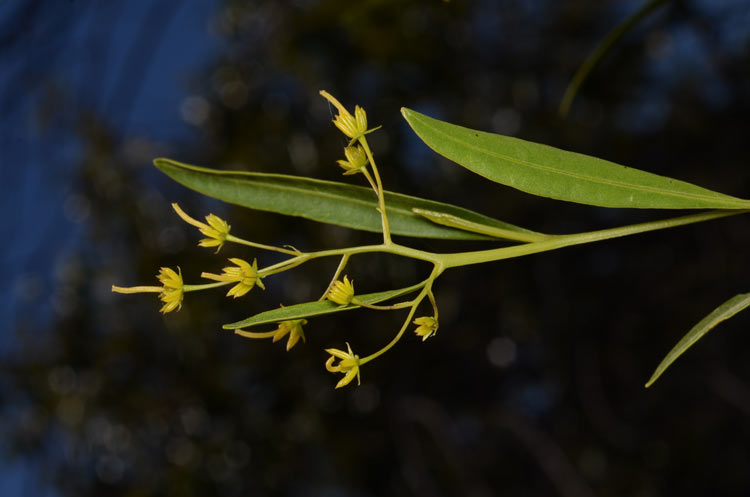
var. subsessilifolia in Minerva Hills National Park

Dodonaea lanceolata, commonly known as pirrungu, or yellow hop-bush, is a species of plant in the family Sapindaceae and is endemic to northern Australia. It is an erect shrub with simple elliptic to oblong or lance-shaped leaves, flowers arranged in panicles on the ends of branches with usually eight stamens, and three-winged capsules.

== Description ==
Dodonaea lanceolata is an erect, dioecious or polygamous shrub that typically grows to a height of 1–3 m (3 ft 3 in – 9 ft 10 in). Its leaves are simple, elliptic to lance-shaped, sometimes with the narrower end towards the base, 30–105 mm (1.2–4.1 in) long and 10–30 mm (0.39–1.18 in) wide, sometimes more or less sessile or on a petiole up to 4.5–15 mm (0.18–0.59 in) long. The flowers are borne in panicles on the ends of branches, each flower on a pedicel 5.5–12 mm (0.22–0.47 in) long with four lance-shaped to egg-shaped sepals 1.4–2.5 mm (0.055–0.098 in) long. There are usually eight stamens and the ovary is glabrous. Flowering occurs from February to October and the fruit is three-winged capsule, 13–19 mm (0.51–0.75 in) long and 14–19 mm (0.55–0.75 in) wide, the membranous wings 4.5–5.5 mm (0.18–0.22 in) wide.

== Taxonomy and naming ==
Dodonaea lanceolata was first formally described in 1859 by Ferdinand von Mueller in his Fragmenta Phytographiae Australiae from specimens collected in Arnhem Land. The specific epithet (lanceolata) means 'lanceolate'.

In 1984, Judith Gay West describe two varieties of D. lanceolata in the journal Brunonia and the names are accepted by the Australian Plant Census:

- Dodonaea lanceolata F.Muell. var. lanceolata has elliptic leaves, tapering at each end, on a petiole usually 4.5–15 mm (0.18–0.59 in) long.
- Dodonaea lanceolata var. subsessilifolia J.G.West has more or less sessile, oblong to lance-shaped leaves with the narrower end towards the base.

== Distribution and habitat ==
Pirrungu occurs in northern and central Australia. Variety lanceolata grows on stony ridges and near rocky watercourses in the Hamersley Range and the Kimberley regions of Western Australia, in the Northern Territory and western Queensland. Variety subsessilifolia grows in open forest and is restricted to eastern Queensland.

== Conservation status ==
Dodonaea lanceolata is listed as "not threatened" by the Government of Western Australia Department of Biodiversity, Conservation and Attractions.
