= Marmalade (insurance) =

- Company type: Private limited company
- Industry: Car insurance
- Founded: 2006
- Founder: Nick Moger, Crispin Moger
- Headquarters: Peterborough, Cambridgeshire, United Kingdom
- Area served: UK
- Key people: Nick Moger, Crispin Moger, Andy Martin
- Services: Insurance

Marmalade is a UK-based insurance company whose main business is car insurance for young people. The company uses telematics, a satellite technology that monitors the use of the car the company is insuring. This monitors the way the car is driven, when is driven and sends the information back to Marmalade. This information is used to change the amount Marmalade charges the driver for insurance, if the company identifies a bad driver it will increase their premiums and may cancel their policy. From May to July 2011 this technology allowed the company to cut its insurance premiums by 17 per cent at a time when the industry trend was for premiums for young drivers to increase.

At the Road Safety GB Conference on 13 November 2009 the company received the Prince Michael International Road Safety Award for its contribution to Road Safety in the UK.

== History ==
Marmalade was formed in 2006 to supply car insurance and cars to new young drivers. In 2008 the company was the winner of the Original Business Concept category in the BT Essence of the Entrepreneur awards. In March 2013, Young Marmalade was combined with sister brands, Intelligent Marmalade and Provisional Marmalade, to exist under the name Marmalade.
