= Water Park Creek =

River in Australia

Water Park
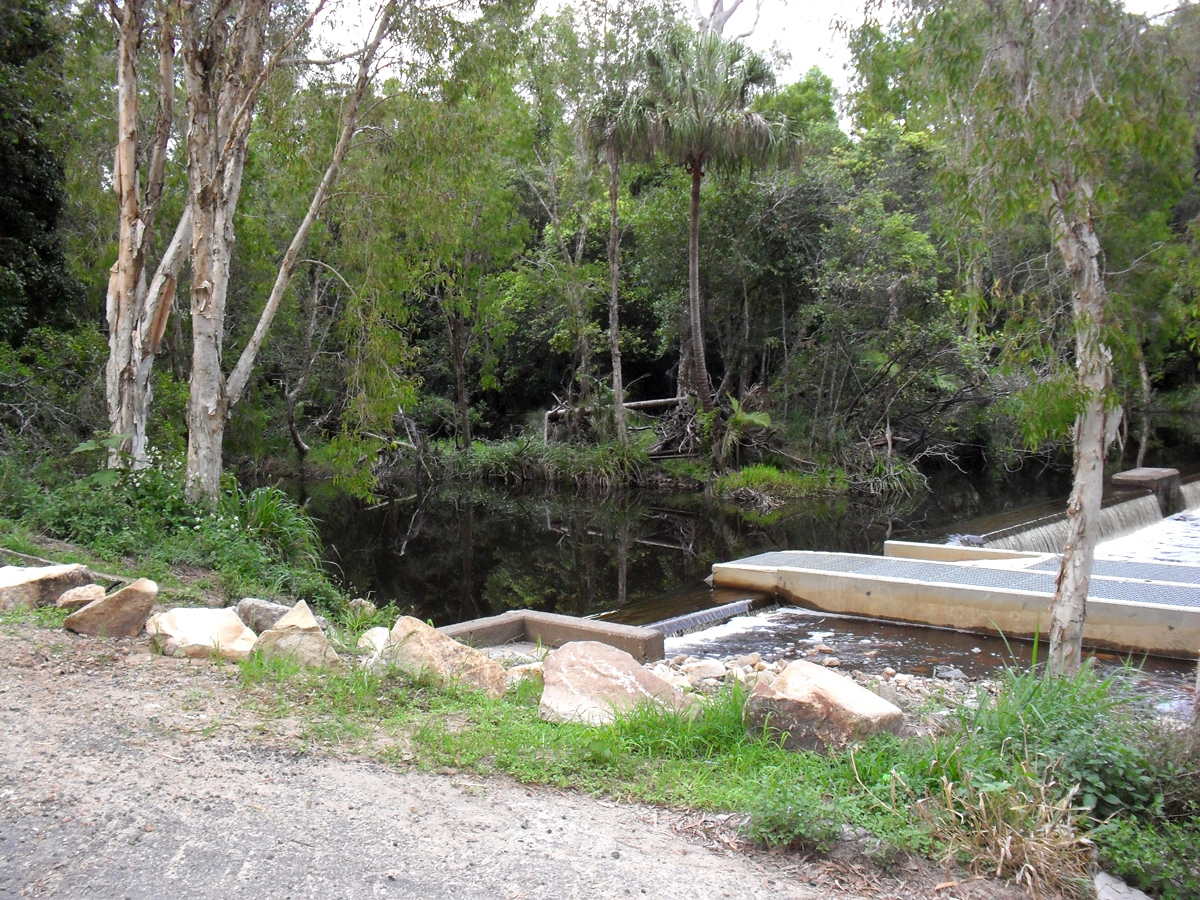
- Water Park Creek in Byfield, 2011

- Location of Water Park Creek mouth in Queensland

Location
- Country: Australia
- State: Queensland
- Region: Central Queensland

Physical characteristics
- Source: Great Dividing Range
  - location: below Samuel Hill
  - elevation: 53 m (174 ft)
- Mouth: Coral Sea
  - location: Corio Bay
  - coordinates: 22.9448°S 150.7866°E
  - elevation: 0 m (0 ft)
- Length: 35 km (22 mi)
- Basin size: 1,836 km^{2} (709 sq mi)

Basin features
- National park: Byfield National Park

Water Park Creek is a creek in Central Queensland, Australia.

The headwaters of the creek rise below Samuel Hill in the Great Dividing Range and flow south-east. The creek continues through the Byfield National Park and then travels almost parallel with the Yeppoon - Byfield Road before discharging into Corio Bay, approximately 15 kilometres (9 mi) north of Yeppoon, and then into the Coral Sea. The creek descends 53 metres (174 ft) over its 35-kilometre (22 mi) course.

The drainage basin of the creek occupies an area of 1,836 square kilometres (709 sq mi) of which an area of 259 square kilometres (100 sq mi) is made up of estuarine wetlands.

In the section within the Byfield National Park, the creek contains a population of Rhadinocentrus ornatus, a small freshwater fish species.

== See also ==
- List of rivers of Australia § Queensland
