= Raspberry Creek Homestead =

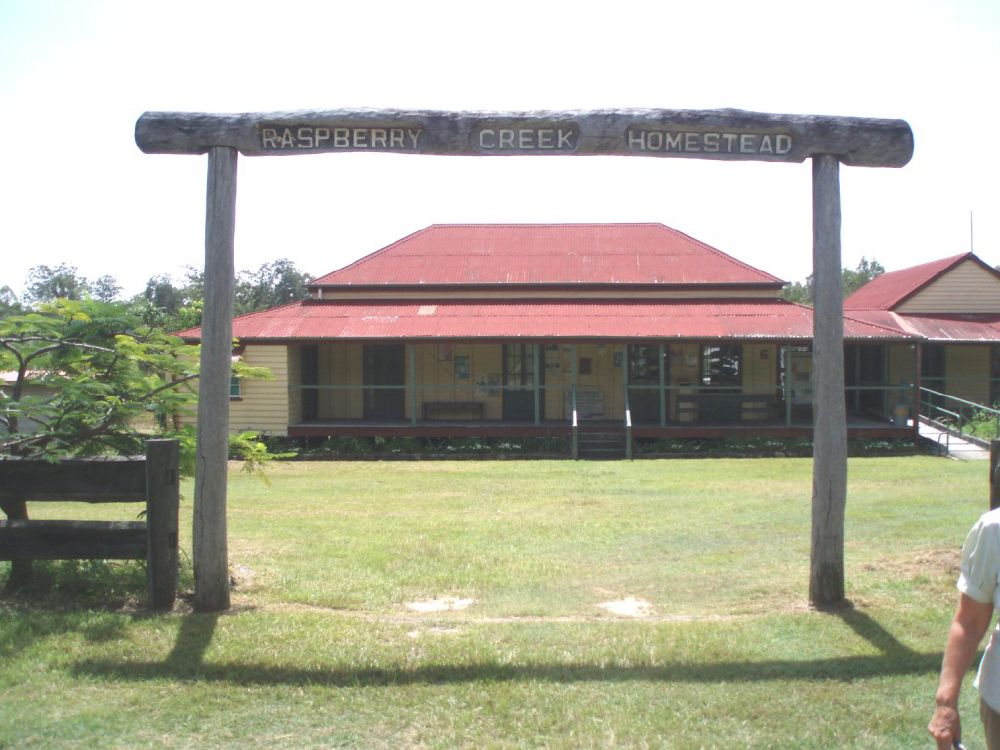
- Raspberry Creek Homestead, 2009

- Location within Queensland Location within Australia
- 22.8351°S 150.6426°E
- Location: 2312 Byfield Road, Byfield, Shire of Livingstone, Queensland, Australia

History
- Design period: 1840s–1860s (mid-19th century)
- Built: circa 1860s

Queensland Heritage Register
- Official name: Raspberry Creek Homestead
- Type: state heritage (built)
- Designated: 21 October 1992
- Reference no.: 600658
- Significant period: 1860s circa – ongoing (social)
- Significant components: residential accommodation – main house

Raspberry Creek Homestead is a heritage-listed former homestead and now museum at 2312 Byfield Road, Byfield, Shire of Livingstone, Queensland, Australia. It was built circa 1860s. It was added to the Queensland Heritage Register on 21 October 1992.

== History ==
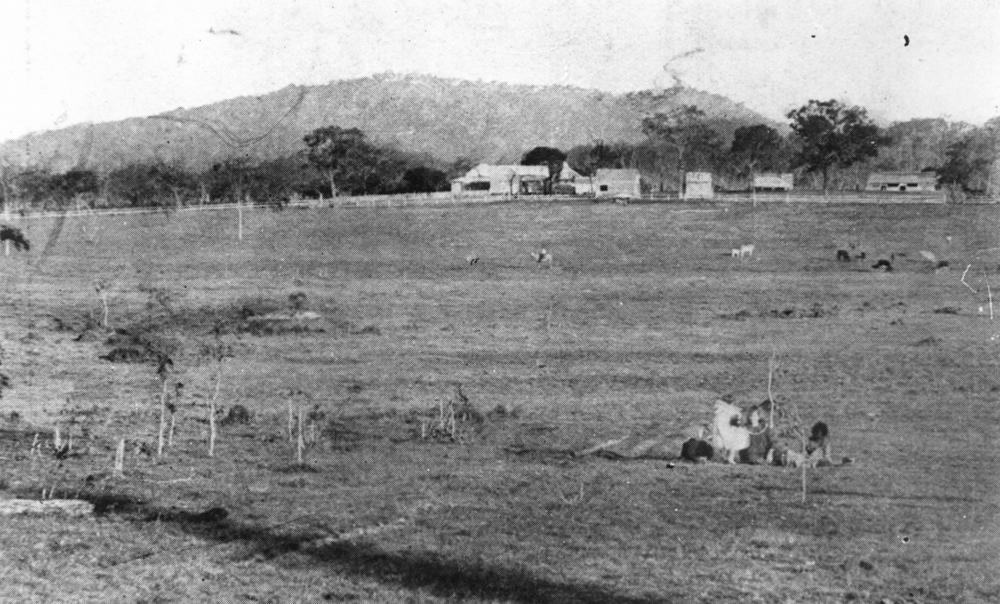
Raspberry Creek homestead, circa 1865

The Raspberry Creek homestead was built by James Hutton and Mary Hutton née Cameron, pioneers of the Shoalwater Bay area in Central Queensland. Originally, a slab hut was constructed in the early 1860s and in ensuing years as the family grew, the homestead was extended. In 1965, the homestead was included in the area taken up as the Shoalwater Bay Training Area. In 1988 the Raspberry Creek Homestead was moved to its present location in the grounds of the Byfield Historical Society.

James Hutton was the son of William Hutton and Rose Ann Hutton née Cleland. William was a farm labourer and native of Inch, County Down, Ireland, and Rose Ann was a farm servant and native of Killyleagh, County Down. William and Rose had ten children, all born in Ireland. The family migrated to Australia, departing from Greenock on 21 May 1841 on the ship Percy, arriving in Sydney on 28 August 1841. Mary Cameron was the daughter of John and Margaret Cameron of Fort William, Inverness, Scotland. John was a boat builder. He and Margaret had eight children, all born in Scotland. They migrated with six of their children on the ship Blonde, arriving 27 December 1849. Both the Camerons and the Huttons settled at or near Falconer Station, later Falconer Township, in the New England area of New South Wales. The families became close through intermarriage: James Hutton married Mary Cameron in 1852; Jemima Hutton married John Cameron in 1855; and Maxwell Hutton married Ellen Cameron in 1861.

Nine years after their marriage, James and Mary Hutton moved with their children to Central Queensland, taking up the Raspberry Creek run, north of Rockhampton, in 1863. The journey took six months and the family brought with them all their possessions, loaded on two buckboards driven by Mary and their seven-year-old son William, and some few hundred head of cattle. Family lore has it that James Hutton had previously visited the area with Robert Ross and his sons, James and John, who were also from the New England district. James Hutton and James Ross formed a partnership to acquire the Raspberry Creek Run. James Hutton then returned to New South Wales selling their property and organising the journey north to Central Queensland.

On arrival, the party went first to Cawarral, where Mary and the children remained until the first bark and slab huts were erected at Raspberry Creek. These huts were about three miles from the site finally selected and were later moved. The present homestead was built using pit-sawn timber for the walls and shingles for the roof.

By 1868, the partnership between Ross and Hutton had dissolved and the Huttons became the sole owners of Raspberry Creek. From 1869, following resumption and opening of the resumed land to selection, the Huttons took up further selections at Shoalwater and Banksia. When the family grew larger, weather boards for extensions were brought in by boat along Shoalwater Creek most stores were brought in by boat as it was easier than overlanding.

In 1894, the Huttons moved to Sydney where they stayed until Mary's death in 1896. James returned to Raspberry Creek and continued to run the station with his eldest son William until his death in 1898. William Hutton resided at Raspberry Creek Homestead until his retirement in 1911. During his time on Raspberry Creek, William, and his wife Rose, gained a reputation for their refined hospitality.

Raspberry Creek was sold to William Naughton in 1914 and passed out of the ownership of the Hutton Family. William Naughton divided and sold the property with Fred and William Flowers brothers applied for resumed portions and forming their stations. Raspberry Creek was bought by Tom Creed in 1939.

Under Commonwealth Acquisition 728, Raspberry Creek homestead become part of the Shoalwater Bay Military Training Area on 1 July 1965. Whilst included within the training area, Raspberry Creek homestead was not in permanent use, though it had been utilised as a base camp for reconnaissance parties and by the Federal Department of Construction employees working within the training area. From mid-1987, Raspberry Creek homestead was not utilised as a base camp.

Relocated from the Shoalwater Bay Training Area in 1988, with the aid of a Bicentennial grant, the Raspberry Creek Homestead is sited on a reserve for Cultural & Historical Purposes under the trusteeship of Livingstone Shire Council and leased by Byfield & District Historical Society Inc. The Society operates a museum and library in the former homestead.

== Description ==
Raspberry Creek Homestead is located in the grounds of the Byfield and District Historical Society, along Byfield Road.

The homestead comprises three sections which were originally attached. Since being moved to the society grounds, the original slab section has been detached. Some of the original material on the slab section of the homestead has been replaced, whilst in other sections the timber framework is exposed.

The two later extensions, located to the west of the slab section, remain attached. The larger of the two sections is constructed of timber on timber stumps with weatherboard cladding and has a verandah on three sides. The building has a corrugated iron roof. It is attached to the smaller extension on the north-east side. The smaller section is timber framed set on timber stumps, clad with weatherboards. A timber ramp is located on the south-eastern side of the larger, three roomed building where it joins with the smaller two- roomed section.

The homestead currently contains items that form part of the material collection of the Byfield and District Historical Society. A library is located in one of the rooms of the larger section.

== Heritage listing ==
Raspberry Creek Homestead was listed on the Queensland Heritage Register on 21 October 1992 having satisfied the following criteria.

The place is important in demonstrating the principal characteristics of a particular class of cultural places.

The former Raspberry Creek Homestead is significant as an extant example of the type of early pioneer construction in the Shoalwater Bay area. With later extensions, Raspberry Creek Homestead provides evidence of the evolution of vernacular architecture.

The place has a strong or special association with a particular community or cultural group for social, cultural or spiritual reasons.

The former Raspberry Creek Homestead is valued by the community as demonstrated by the project to preserve it as an important part of the history of the area, and it is associated with the historical society whose focus it has been since the late 1980s.

The place has a special association with the life or work of a particular person, group or organisation of importance in Queensland's history.

The former Raspberry Creek Homestead is significant for its association with James and Mary Hutton, early pioneers in the Shoalwater Bay area.
