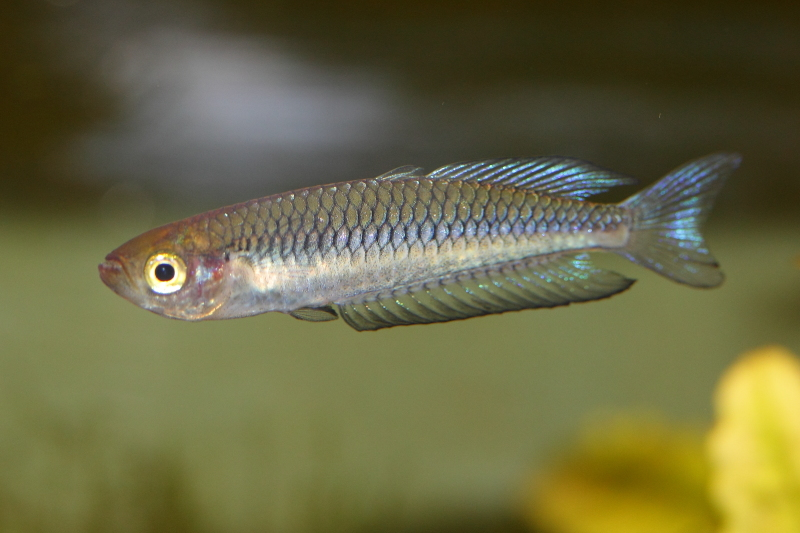
- Male from Searys Creek, southeast Queensland, Australia
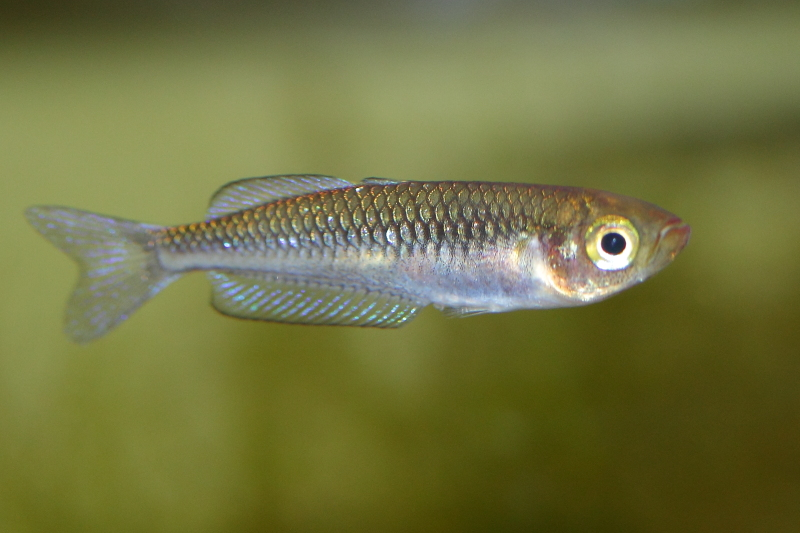
- Female from Searys Creek, southeast Queensland, Australia

Conservation status
- Vulnerable (IUCN 3.1)

Scientific classification
- Kingdom: Animalia
- Phylum: Chordata
- Class: Actinopterygii
- Order: Atheriniformes
- Suborder: Atherinoidei
- Family: Melanotaeniidae
- Genus: Rhadinocentrus; Regan, 1914
- Species: R. ornatus

Binomial name
- Rhadinocentrus ornatus Regan, 1914

= Ornate rainbowfish =

Species of fish

The ornate rainbowfish (Rhadinocentrus ornatus) is a species of rainbowfish endemic to an area in eastern Australia, where it is native to coastal regions and sandy offshore islands in southern Queensland and northern New South Wales. It is the only known member of its genus. It is a popular aquarium fish.

== Description ==
The ornate rainbowfish is a small, slender and rather elongated species of rainbowfish. It has two dorsal fins that are only narrowly separated, and the first dorsal fin is considerably smaller than the second. There are 3 to 5 thin, soft spines in the first dorsal fin while the second dorsal fin has 11–15 segmented rays.

This species is highly variable in colour over its range. The body is semi-transparent, and they have two rows of black scales along the middle of their flanks. They have iridescent scales above the lateral line and just below the dorsal fin, and these can be either red or a metallic light blue. The dorsal, anal and caudal fins are normally blue, although are sometimes red, and have black edges. The semi-transparent body may have hues of blue, pink or red with the dark edges of the scales creating a network-like pattern and the two mid-lateral dark stripes described above. They have neon blue iridescent patches on their backs and on the nape. An example of the geographic variation in colour is that a golden-yellow morph is found in the Key Hole Lakes system on Stradbroke Island, while another population on that island had distinctive black stripes on the flanks which created an overall dark colouration. The males of this species grows to a length of 6 centimetres (2.4 in) Standard Length, the females to 3.5 centimetres (1.4 in).

== Distribution ==
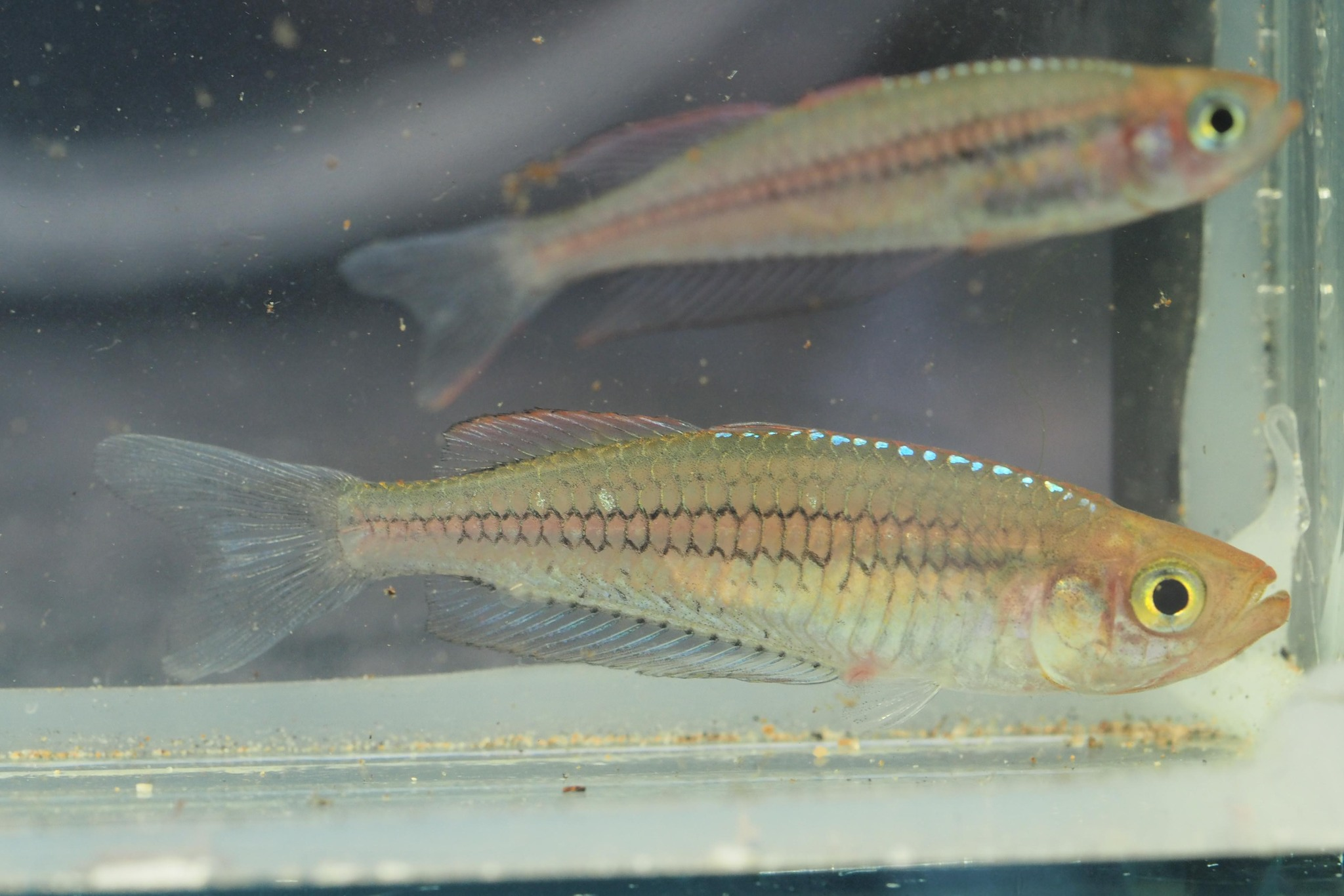
In Queensland

The ornate rainbowfish is found in subtropical freshwaters in southern Queensland and northern New South Wales. Its range is coastal areas to the east of the Great Dividing Range from near Maryborough to Coffs Harbour. The species distribution extends to sandy islands of southern Queensland including Bribie, Fraser, Moreton and North Stradbroke Islands. On the mainland its distribution is continuous in the southern part of its range but there is a disjunct population in the Byfield area which is separated from the southern population by 350 kilometres (220 miles).

== Habitat and biology ==
Ornate rainbowfish inhabit freshwater creeks, streams, ponds and dune lakes in the coastal dune habitat locally known as wallum. Their typical habitat is sandy coastal areas where they are found in sluggish, acid waters stained with tannins from vegetation falling into the water where there is woody debris in the water, grassy banks, and thick submerged and emergent vegetation. In these habitats the ornate rainbowfish prefers to be in cover among submerged woody debris, in grassy banks and reeds; and within waterlily roots. It has also been recorded in clear streams with a slow current and little or no vegetation in gallery forests. This species can tolerate very soft waters and is known to live in water as acidic as orange juice.

This species congregates in small schools, especially where the habitat is clear, slow, shady streams over sands. These may be mixed schools with Nannoperca oxleyana and Pseudomugil mellis. This omnivorous species feeds mainly from the surface, and its diet consists of crustaceans, aquatic and terrestrial insects, pollen, algae and organic detritus. It is sexually dimorphic; the males are more brightly-coloured than the females with an elongated second ray in the second dorsal fin and an elongated anal fin. When breeding, the males develop a red nuptial stripe which runs from the snout to the second dorsal fin. The males are territorial and defend their territories from other males. Over a period of several days, the females lay eggs which stick to aquatic plants by an adhesive thread on the outside of each egg. The larvae hatch after a week to ten days. In the aquarium they reach sexual maturity between 9–12 months old and may have a lifespan of up to 4 years. The spawning season runs from November to January.

== Conservation ==
The ornate rainbowfish is divided into four genetically distinct populations: the northern mainland population which occurs from Byfield south to Tin Can Bay and Fraser Island in Queensland; the Searys Creek population in the area of Rainbow Beach; a population which occurs from the Noosa River in Queensland south to Brunswick River which includes the subpopulations on Moreton, Bribie and Stradbroke Islands; and a fourth in northern New South Wales south of the Brunswick River. These populations are also fragmented within their own geographic areas, and they are threatened by the invasive Eastern mosquitofish Gambusia holbrooki. Other threats include land clearance, habitat degradation and urbanisation. This species is listed as "vulnerable" by the IUCN.

The distribution of the ornate rainbowfish has contracted as a result of urban and rural development, this contraction being exacerbated by the subsequent alterations to hydrology and to the water quality. These factors continue to have negative impacts on populations of this species in a number of localities. Extensive sampling of rivers and streams in mainland south-east Queensland under the auspices of Wildlife Preservation Society of Queensland in the years leading up to 2014 discovered relatively few individual ornate rainbowfish. Due to ecology and geographic distribution of this species, each time a subpopulation is lost it is likely a unique genetic lineage may be being lost too. However, new subpopulations were still being discovered.

== Taxonomy and etymology ==
The ornate rainbowfish was described by Charles Tate Regan in 1914 from types collected on Moreton Island. The generic name is a compound noun consisting of the Greek for "slender", rhadinos, and for spine, centron, a reference to the slender and flexible finrays in the dorsal fin. The specific name ornatus is Latin and means "decorated".

Rhadinocentrus ornatus is the only species in the genus Rhadinocentrus.

The ornate rainbowfish is very closely associated with the warm and peaty wallum wetland habitats that its range almost exactly corresponds to that habitat type. Each permanent coastal stream within its range appears to have fish with different colouration or patterning. These subpopulations have evolved in isolation over the last ten millennia as the rising sea levels have cut each population off from those in neighbouring coastal streams.

== As an aquarium fish ==
Rhadinocentrus ornatus is a popular aquarium fish in Australia, having been popular among aquarists who keep the native fish of Australia for many decades, although it appears to be rarely available outside of Australia.
