= Byfield, Queensland =

Byfield
- Town
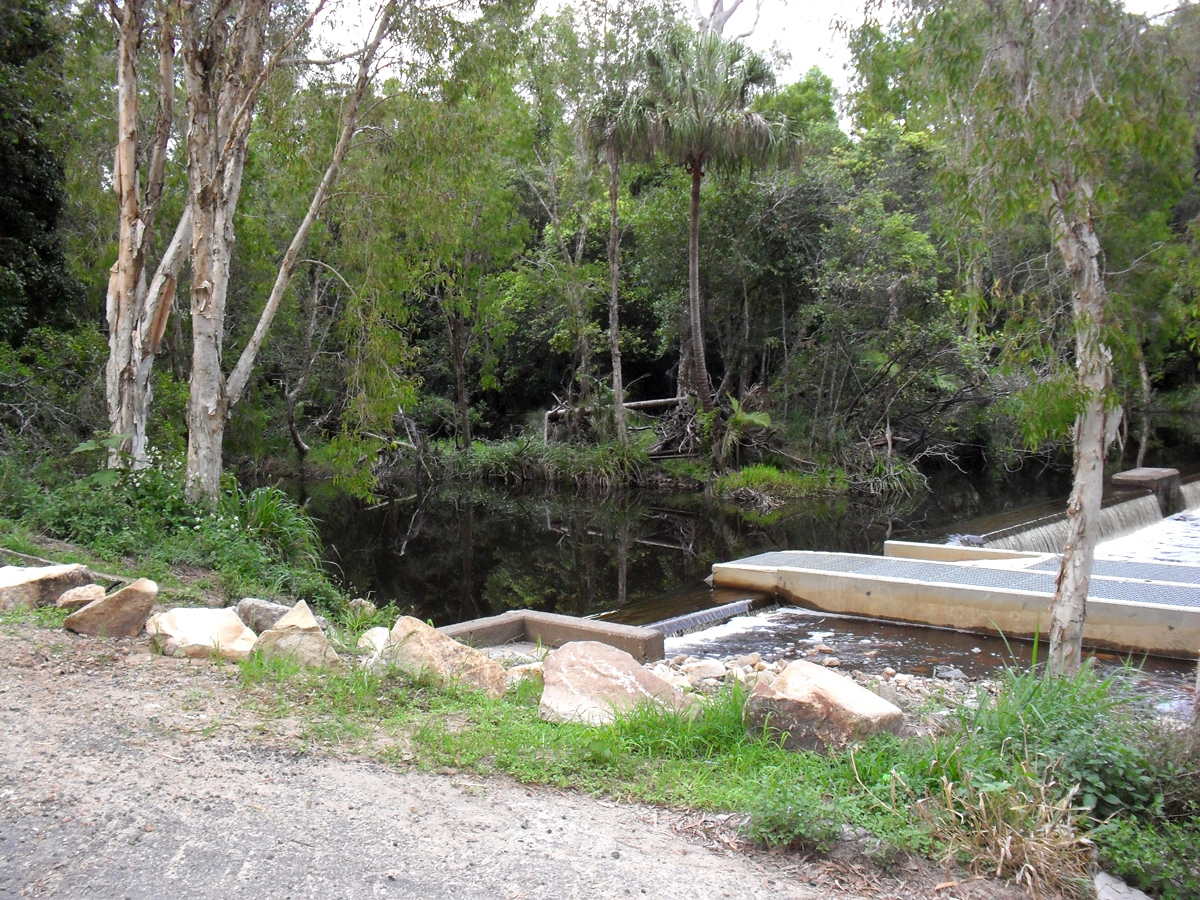
- Water Park Creek, Byfield

- Interactive map of Byfield
- Coordinates: 22.8897°S 150.6380°E
- Country: Australia
- State: Queensland
- LGA: Shire of Livingstone
- Location: 41.3 km (25.7 mi) NNW of Yeppoon; 78.2 km (48.6 mi) NNE of Rockhampton; 717 km (446 mi) NNW of Brisbane

Government
  - State electorate: Keppel
  - Federal division: Capricornia

Area
  - Total: 179.8 km^{2} (69.4 sq mi)

Population
  - Total: 323 (2021 census)
  - Density: 1.796/km^{2} (4.653/sq mi)
- Time zone: UTC+10:00 (AEST)
- Postcode: 4703
Localities around Byfield
| Shoalwater | Weerriba | Weerriba |
| Canal Creek | Byfield | Stockyard |
| Maryvale | Maryvale | Woodbury |

Byfield is a rural locality in the Shire of Livingstone, Queensland, Australia. In the 2021 census, the locality of Byfield had a population of 323 people.

== Geography ==
Byfield is located in the midst of the Byfield National Park in Central Queensland, 717 kilometres (446 mi) north west of the state capital Brisbane and 78 kilometres (48 mi) north of the regional centre of Rockhampton. It is within the local government area of Shire of Livingstone (between 2008 and 2013, it was within the Rockhampton Region).

Water Park Creek forms much of the north-eastern boundary. Sandy Creek, a tributary of Water Park Creek, also forms part of that boundary.

== History ==
The locality's name is thought to be a corruption of Fifefield, a name shown on a 1859 sketch by pastoralist Colin Archer.

Byfield State School opened its doors on 12 November 1923.

== Demographics ==
In the 2006 census, the town of Byfield had a population of 275 people.

In the 2011 census, the locality of Byfield had a population of 261 people.

In the 2016 census, the locality of Byfield had a population of 301 people (53.3% male, 46.7% female, in 87 family units).

In the 2021 census, the locality of Byfield had a population of 323 people.

== Heritage listings ==
Byfield has a number of heritage-listed sites, including:

- Raspberry Creek Homestead, 2312 Byfield Road
- Old Byfield Road, between Byfield Road and Richters Road

== Amenities ==
The Livingstone Shire Council operate a public library at the Raspberry Creek Homestead at 2312 Byfield Road.

There is a general store in Byfield which caters for light meals as well as fuel and grocery items.

Byfield has retreat style cabins and camping, offering accommodation in a rainforest setting with natural creeks and waterholes.

== Education ==
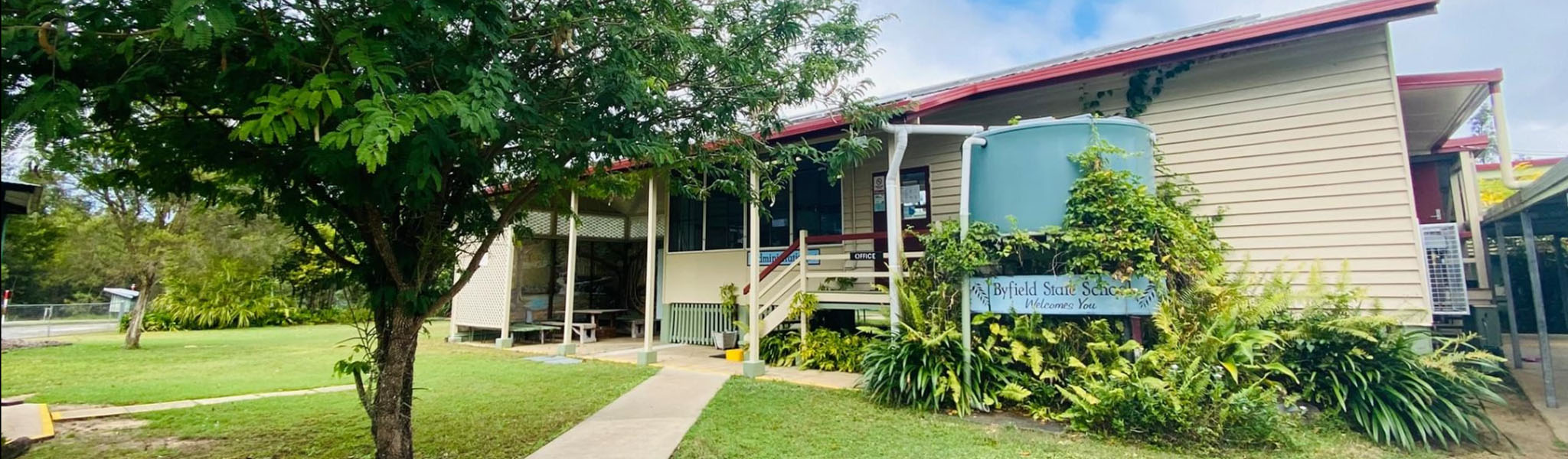
Byfield State School, 2025

Byfield State School is a government primary (Prep–6) school for boys and girls at 2233 Byfield Road (22.8412°S 150.6461°E). In 2017, the school had an enrolment of 33 students with 3 teachers (2 full-time equivalent) and 5 non-teaching staff (2 full-time equivalent).

There is no secondary school in Byfield; the nearest is Yeppoon State High School in Yeppoon to the south-east.
