= Byfield National Park =

National park in Queensland, Australia

- IUCN category II (national park)
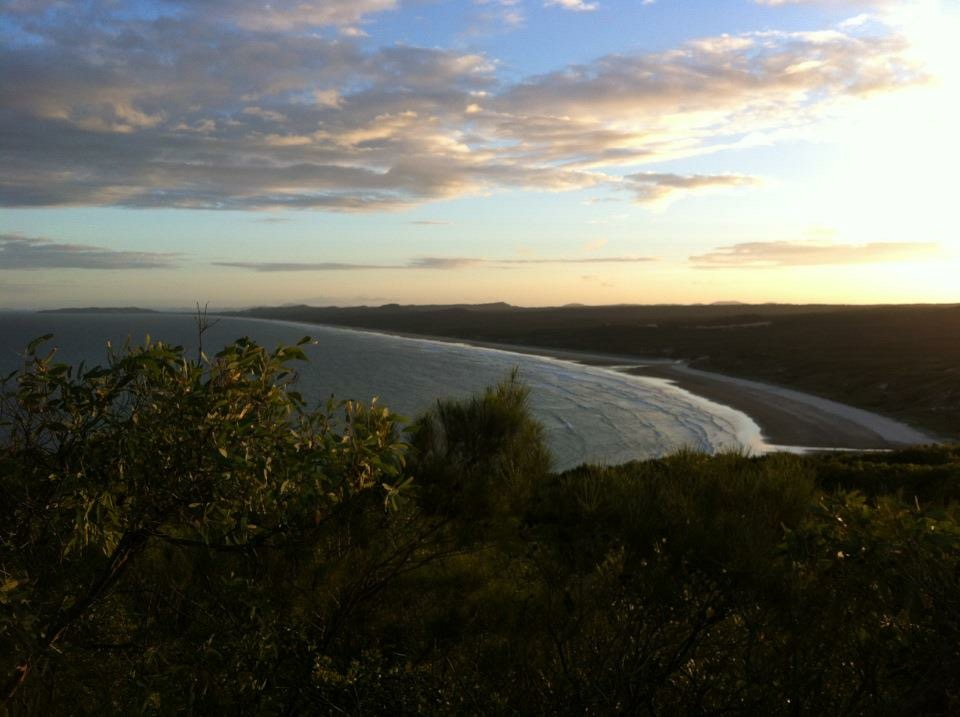
- Nine Mile Beach, Byfield National Park

- Location within Queensland
- Location: Queensland
- Coordinates: 22°47′02″S 150°43′54″E
- Area: 87 km^{2} (34 sq mi)
- Established: 1988
- Governing body: Queensland Parks and Wildlife Service

Byfield National Park is a national park in the Shire of Livingstone, Queensland, Australia.

== Geography ==
Byfield National Park map, 2018

The park is 70 km north-east of Rockhampton. The parks encloses 12 km of coastline including four beaches.

To the north of the national park is Shoalwater Bay and Byfield State Forest is located to the west of Byfield National Park.

The park contains a number of four-wheel drive tracks and camping areas.

The average elevation of the terrain in the park is 48 metres.

== Climate ==
The park demarcates the southern boundary of a tropical savannah climate (Köppen: Aw), although the subtropics are almost a degree to the south.

== Flora and fauna ==
The park is home to Pandanus tectorius, a plant useful against coastal erosion and provides important habitat for many insects and animals. Rangers are fighting a destructive pest known as the pandanus planthopper in the park, using various means including the use of a native wasp called Aphanomerus pusillus.

Water Park Creek, a creek which flows through the park, contains a population of Rhadinocentrus ornatus, a small freshwater fish species.

== See also ==
- Protected areas of Queensland
