= Macrozamia concinna =

Conservation status
- Least Concern (IUCN 3.1)

Scientific classification
- Kingdom: Plantae
- Clade: Tracheophytes
- Clade: Gymnospermae
- Division: Cycadophyta
- Class: Cycadopsida
- Order: Cycadales
- Family: Zamiaceae
- Genus: Macrozamia
- Species: M. concinna

Binomial name
- Macrozamia concinna D.L. Jones
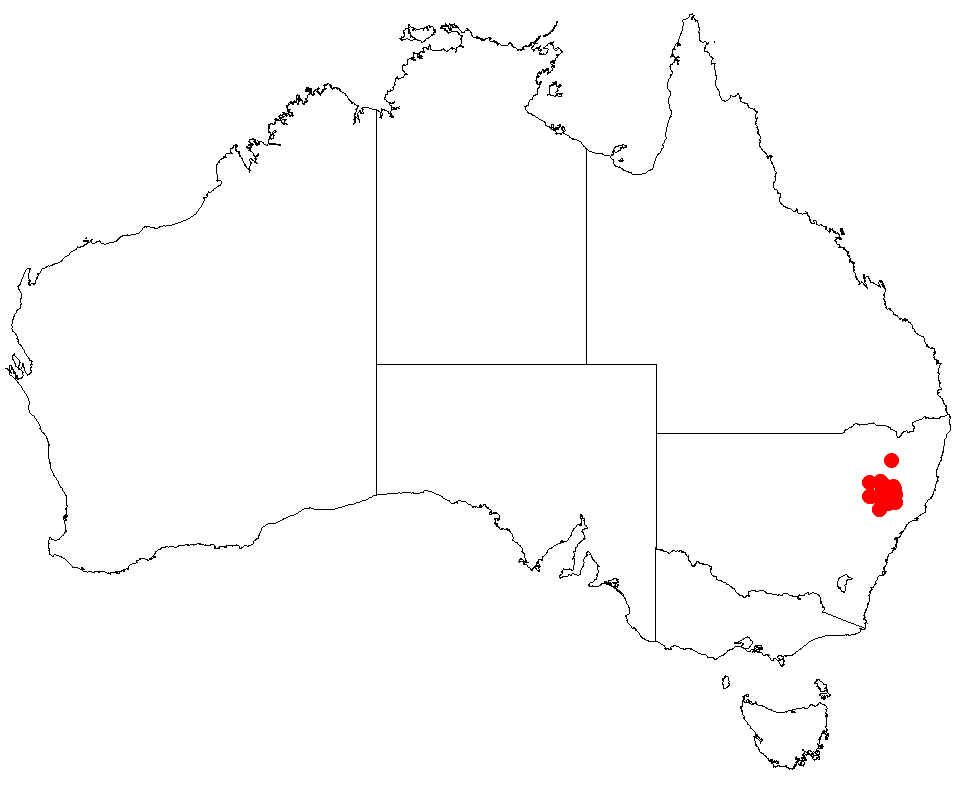
- Occurrence data from AVH

Species of cycad

Macrozamia concinna is a part of the plant family, Zamiaceae. It originates from a division of Cycadophyta which encompasses the complete species of cycads. M. concinna is primarily habituated in New South Wales, Australia and maintains a distinct appearance allowing it to be easily identifiable from other cycads. M. concinna also implements a unique method of reproduction to fertilise its offsprings, as opposed to the common method of wind pollination. This difference in reproduction mechanisms has survived throughout the ages of prehistoric cycad species and M. concinna continues to procreate with it.

The population of M. concinna is under threat from habitat loss associated with urbanisation, potential reproduction failure and loss to fire.

== Etymology ==
M. concinna was named in 1988 by D.L. Jones, classifying the plant after its prim and proper appearance, where it was finally recognised as its own separate species. Prior to its unique classification, it had been categorised as being part of the M. pauli-guilielmi umbrella.

The specific epithet concinna stems from the Latin for neat or elegant in a compact and tidy habitat. The unanimous decision to continue the name has been confirmed with the moniker being used in various publications as well as being identified throughout multiple journals regarding cycads.

== History ==
M. concinna's heritage originates back 280 million years ago during the Permian period, often being cited as one of the oldest living seed organism that still exists within the current geological flora. The occurrence of these plants happened to precede the dominance of dinosaurs, which was estimated to being around 240 million years ago. M. concinna specifically, was discovered to be descended from cycad ferns during the Mesozoic age and have often been referred to as living fossils.

== Biology ==
M. concinna is often characterised as a dwarf cycad that has both male and female varieties that are vicariously covered in leaf bases.

There are often certain characteristics found relating to M. concinna. A description of these cycads sorts them by a variety of leaves unique to each individual plant that pinnate with the possibility of these pinnae dividing themselves down the middle of the leaves to form 2 distinct sides. The florae themselves frequently have darker green fronds with them twisting multiple times at the base. The seeds produced by M. concinna are visually distinguishable with their reddish complexion. M. concinna plant has a usual 1 – 5 fronds in diameter of 50–90 cm long, connected to the stem or the base, which is spirally twisted. The amount of fronds each plant will have in particular bears no resemblance to the habitat but rather is dependent on a product of genetics. The longest frond on the cycad may stretch from 14 to 21 cm long by 4–6 cm wide. The pinnae that stem from the frond usually take on discernible characteristics on M. concinna as opposed to other plants within the Macrozamia Family. The pinnae on M. concinna tend to grow in a spiral 360 degree motion laterally from the stem of the plant. The pinnae may twist several times rather than just once. It may also be that certain pinnae do not twist at all. The plant also has the ability to prorate cones. These cones are usually gender specific with female species having only one cone with dimensions of 13–15 cm long, 7–8 cm in diameter with their seeds being 2.1-2.6 cm long and 1.8-2.4 cm wide. Males are usually identified with having 1-2 cones on a sporadic basis, with the cones being 14–22 cm long with a diameter of 4-4.5 cm with spines of 0–1.3 cm long.

M. concinna had been previously misclassified for a number of years before D.L. Jones specified its difference to widespread classification. Inadvertently, M. concinna still "relates in varying degrees to each of the other three New South Wales' cycads possessing multi-twisted stems" (M. fawcettii, M. flexuosa and M. plurinervia). It has a close relationship to the larger M. plurinervia, (from which it was segregated) but is more akin in size and general characteristics to M. flexuosa." This would provide some insight into why it was misclassified in the first place.

In addition to its physical structure, M. concinna's physiological process follows the lineage of gymnosperms, a plant with less complex fertility processes, lacking an ovary or unable to produce fruit. Gymnosperms themselves have been around for 319 million years and are shared between a number of genus's including cycads, ginkgos and conifers. Unfortunately, the continuation of the species is declining with each year as gymnosperms face a higher risk of extinction with over a 40% possibility.

== Habitat ==
M. concinna is endemic to New South Wales and is classified as part of their native flora. They are usually fond of dry areas and can be found in dry eucalyptus forests under a eucalyptus canopy with a medium to dense understory. The sparsely spread species is usually found in habitats containing dry sclerophyll woodlands present through upper hunter valley, north of the Nundle and hanging Rock region, ranging outwards all the way through to around Liverpool plains(CSIRO, 1998). The plants usually prefer slopes at high altitude, with an elevation of 800 metres to 1200 metres. M. concinna has been spotted on several occasions but its most recent spotting has happened to be on hanging rock, at an elevation of approximately 900m.

== Reproduction ==
Cycads in general were initially thought to have utilised wind pollination techniques in order to propagate their seeds into fertility. Only recently, Scientists uncovered the idiosyncratic method that M. concinna utilised to pollinate their seeds.

In addition, M. concinna, along with other cycads are shown to share a mutualistic relationship with insect pollinators called thrips or Cycadothrips chadwiki by their scientific name. Terry, Walter, Moore, Roemer and Hull concluded in their published paper "Odour mediated push pull Pollination in cycads" that "Pollen-laden thrips leave male cycad cones in a single mass during the daily thermogenic phase, when cone temperatures and volatile emissions increase dramatically, thrips are repelled. As thermogenesis declines, total volatile emissions diminish and cones attract thrips, resulting in pollination of female cones." The heat produced within the cone occurs within the strobili of M. concinna. The generation of heat follows a "cycardian rhythm" which is co-ordinated based on the "size and durability of the strobili." It is assumed that the strobili contains starch that produces the necessary reactions for thermogenesis to occur. Within M. concinna and other cycads, the resulting heat perpetuated from the strobili to the cone is often characterised with a smell.

This would indicate that depending on the heat given off by the cones, the thrips are able to detect a scent unique to that temperature. When temperatures fluctuates too much, at quick speeds, the thrips are repelled, almost like a push mechanism. When the heat produced by the cone stagnates and the volatility of temperatures reduce, it releases an odour detected by the thrips which attracts them, symbolic of a pull mechanism.

M. concinna is a threatened species according to the IUCN red list and this is due to the particular close extinction of their pollinator thrips. According to the IUCN red list, there are only 1000 – 2500 mature species left in the wild with the population slowly declining in the coming years.

== Evolutionary properties ==
The uniqueness of the M. concinna is that it is part of a genus that is used as an anchor to compare the evolutionary path and characteristics of both gymnosperms and angiosperms. The difference between these 2 plants is that Gymnosperms are characterised as flowerless plants who produce cones and seeds that are not enclosed within an ovary but rather sit on the surface of the plant. In comparison, Angiosperms are vascular plants, commonly distinguished with a root system, stems and flowers. Within angiosperms, the plant encloses the seeds behind the stigma and therefore, reproduction occurs in a completely different mechanisms to gymnosperms. The importance of M. concinna's lineage is that it provides insight into the evolutionary distinctions between both gymnosperms and angiosperms, acting as an intermediary species within its physical and physiological systems. The importance of this distinction has been quoted by famous cycadologist Knut Norstog, in comparing the analysis of cycad history to the interpretation of the rosetta stone, signifying the importance of M. concinna and its origins to understanding the "origins of seed plants and their counterparts."

One method of comparing the evolution of M. concinna as a gymnosperm is to evaluate the branching mechanisms that are utilised within the system. Common ancestry shared with M. concinna indicates that an isotomous branching system has remained pivotal within its heritage. This, in comparison with seed plants indicates a certain evolutionary change that led to a different branching structure to take place. This has been analysed through careful observation to be due to two subsequent evolutionary stages to lead to the formation of the flowering plants branching system.

A further distinction between both M. concinna development stage can be made during a process surrounding the megagametophyte. During the early development phase of the formation of the gametophyte, which is the reproduction organ of plants, the megagametophyte has unrestricted ability to undergo nuclear division to produce a megagametophyte with several nuclei within a single enclosed membrane. This process has been compared to the formation of gametophytes in angiosperms as well, which helps to bridge the connection and lineage that the M. concinna plant belongs to. The distinction which separates the plants from angiosperms is the resulting outcome of these cells. Within plants like M. concinna, gymnosperm reproduction cells are haploids, and the endosperm of angiosperms are triploids. Furthermore, the endosperm are developed post-fertilisation whilst the megagametophyte is mainly completed pre-fertilisation. Therefore, after discussing the findings of the fertilisation process and the reproduction cells within angiosperms and gymnosperms, it was discovered that the differences were down to the time at which both started the reproduction process. The reporductory system was completed in gymnosperms like M. concinna during pollination whilst angiosperm reproductions began when fertilised.

== Horticulture ==
M. concinna is known to possess qualities that thrive in dry areas but also survive cold temperatures through their acclimation to higher latitudes of placement. This results in great difficulty in sporing one within a controlled environment. The rarity of doing so has been noted by various bloggers to being one that is difficult to attain in maturity. Adversely, it is also a plant that lacks the necessary qualities that attracts botanists or plant enthusiast to actively pursue an adult sample.
