= Macrozamia longispina =

Conservation status
- Near Threatened (IUCN 3.1)

Scientific classification
- Kingdom: Plantae
- Clade: Tracheophytes
- Clade: Gymnospermae
- Division: Cycadophyta
- Class: Cycadopsida
- Order: Cycadales
- Family: Zamiaceae
- Genus: Macrozamia
- Species: M. longispina

Binomial name
- Macrozamia longispina P.I.Forst. & D.L.Jones

Species of cycad

Macrozamia longispina is a species of plant in the family Zamiaceae. It is endemic to Australia.
