= Macrozamia serpentina =

Scientific classification
- Kingdom: Plantae
- Clade: Tracheophytes
- Clade: Gymnospermae
- Division: Cycadophyta
- Class: Cycadopsida
- Order: Cycadales
- Family: Zamiaceae
- Genus: Macrozamia
- Species: M. serpentina

Binomial name
- Macrozamia serpentina D.L.Jones & P.I.Forst.

Species of cycad

Macrozamia serpentina is a species of cycad in the family Zamiaceae endemic to Queensland, Australia.
