= Macrozamia elegans =

Conservation status
- Endangered (IUCN 3.1)

Scientific classification
- Kingdom: Plantae
- Clade: Tracheophytes
- Clade: Gymnospermae
- Division: Cycadophyta
- Class: Cycadopsida
- Order: Cycadales
- Family: Zamiaceae
- Genus: Macrozamia
- Species: M. elegans

Binomial name
- Macrozamia elegans K.D.Hill & D.L.Jones
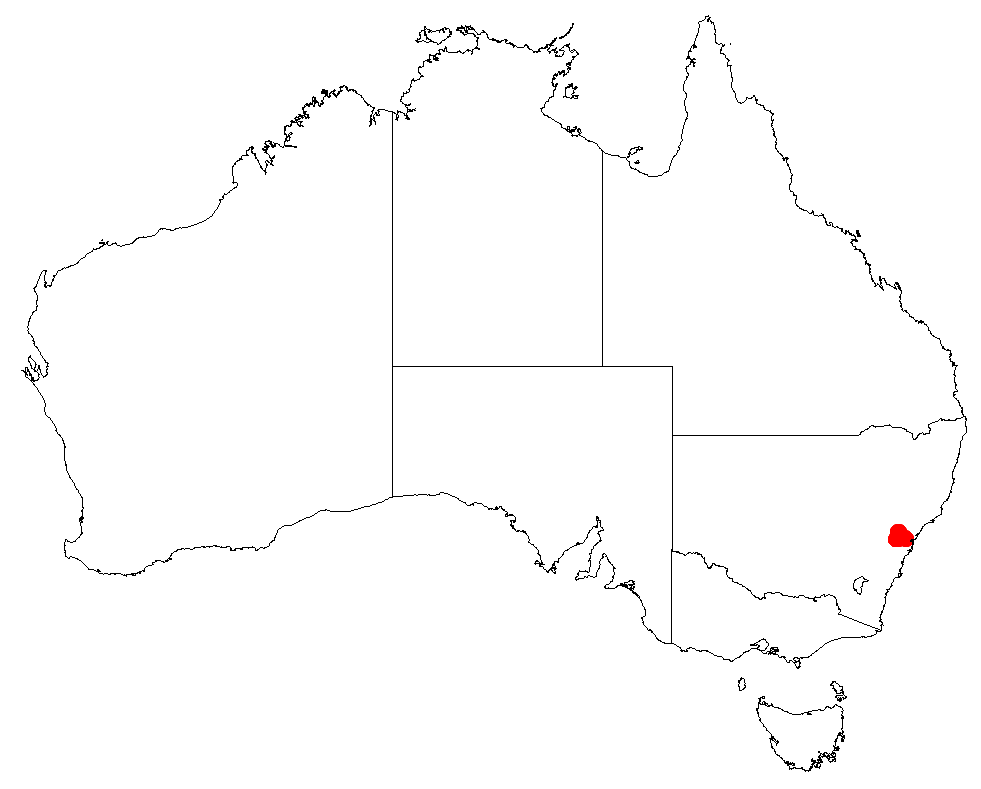
- Occurrence data from AVH

Species of cycad

Macrozamia elegans is a species of plant in the family Zamiaceae. It is endemic to New South Wales, Australia.

This species grows in the Blue Mountains near the village of Mountain Lagoon. It occurs in dense vegetation in eucalypt woodland habitat.
