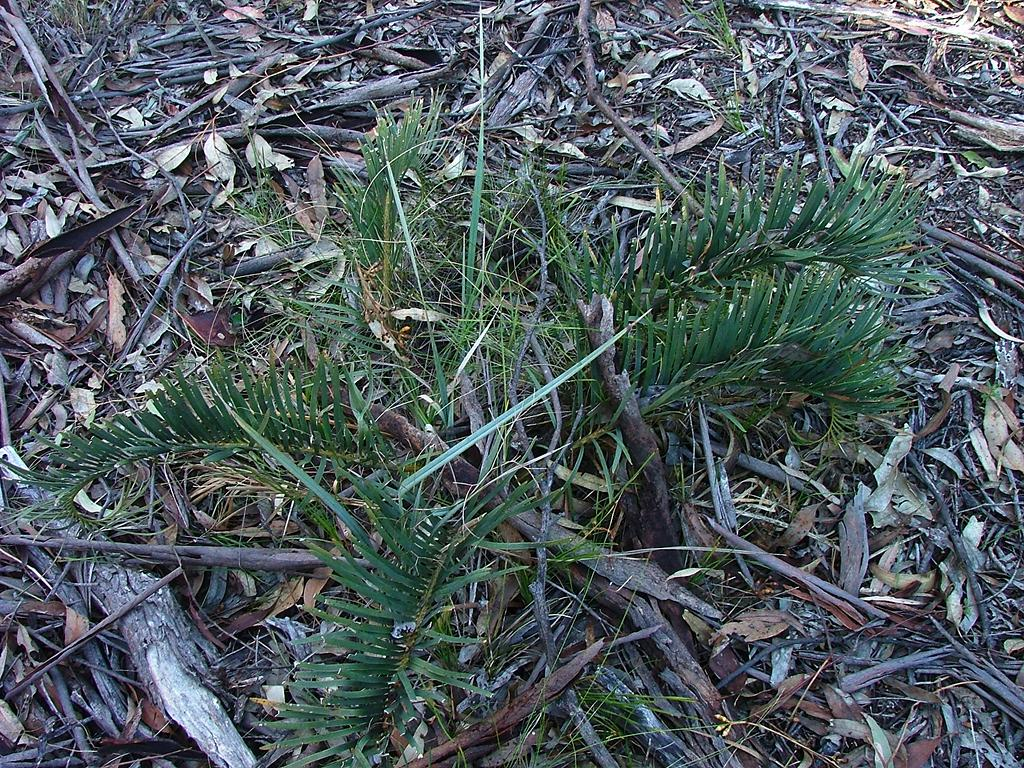

Conservation status
- Vulnerable (IUCN 3.1)

Scientific classification
- Kingdom: Plantae
- Clade: Tracheophytes
- Clade: Gymnospermae
- Division: Cycadophyta
- Class: Cycadopsida
- Order: Cycadales
- Family: Zamiaceae
- Genus: Macrozamia
- Species: M. secunda

Binomial name
- Macrozamia secunda C.Moore
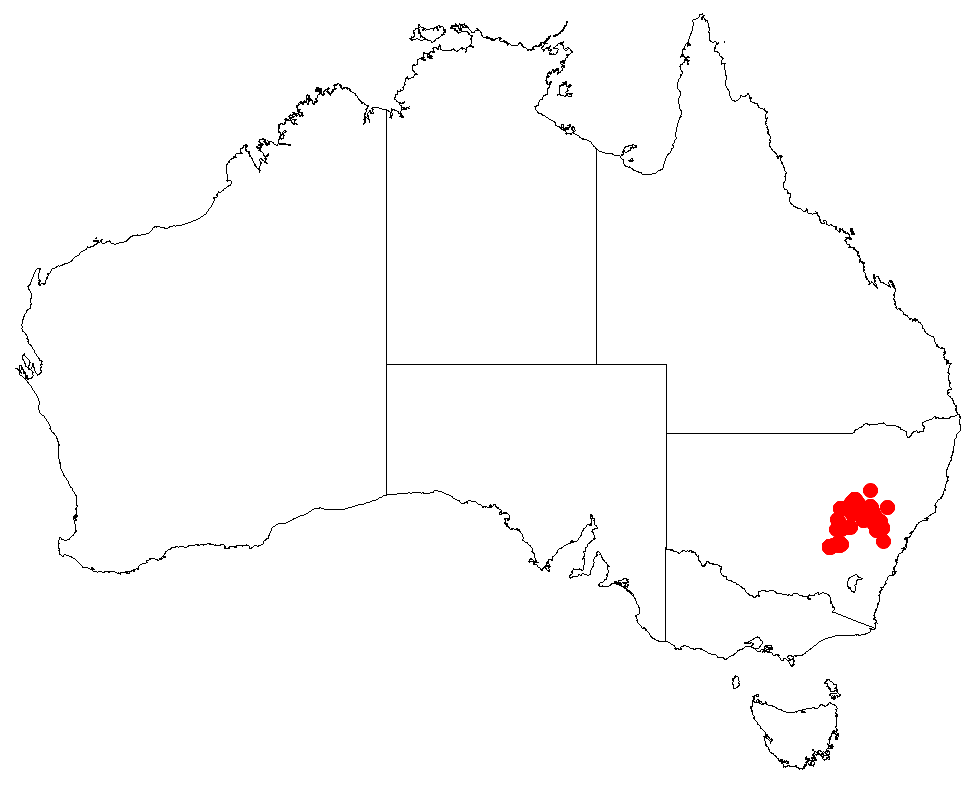
- Occurrence data from AVH

= Macrozamia secunda =

Species of cycad

Macrozamia secunda is a species of plant in the family Zamiaceae. It is endemic to New South Wales, Australia, where rainfall is fairly constant throughout the year. Its seeds are a reddish color and its fronds are generally somewhere between blue and grey in color.
