= Macrozamia conferta =

Conservation status
- Vulnerable (IUCN 3.1)

Scientific classification
- Kingdom: Plantae
- Clade: Tracheophytes
- Clade: Gymnospermae
- Division: Cycadophyta
- Class: Cycadopsida
- Order: Cycadales
- Family: Zamiaceae
- Genus: Macrozamia
- Species: M. conferta

Binomial name
- Macrozamia conferta D.L.Jones & P.I.Forst.

Species of cycad

Macrozamia conferta is a species of plant in the family Zamiaceae. It is endemic to Queensland, Australia.

This species grows in eucalypt woodland habitat. There are six or seven known subpopulations. The species may be threatened by poaching.
