= Macrozamia cranei =

Conservation status
- Endangered (IUCN 3.1)

Scientific classification
- Kingdom: Plantae
- Clade: Tracheophytes
- Clade: Gymnospermae
- Division: Cycadophyta
- Class: Cycadopsida
- Order: Cycadales
- Family: Zamiaceae
- Genus: Macrozamia
- Species: M. cranei

Binomial name
- Macrozamia cranei D.L.Jones & P.I.Forst.

Species of cycad

Macrozamia cranei is a species of plant in the family Zamiaceae. It is endemic to Australia. Its natural habitat is subtropical or tropical dry forests.
