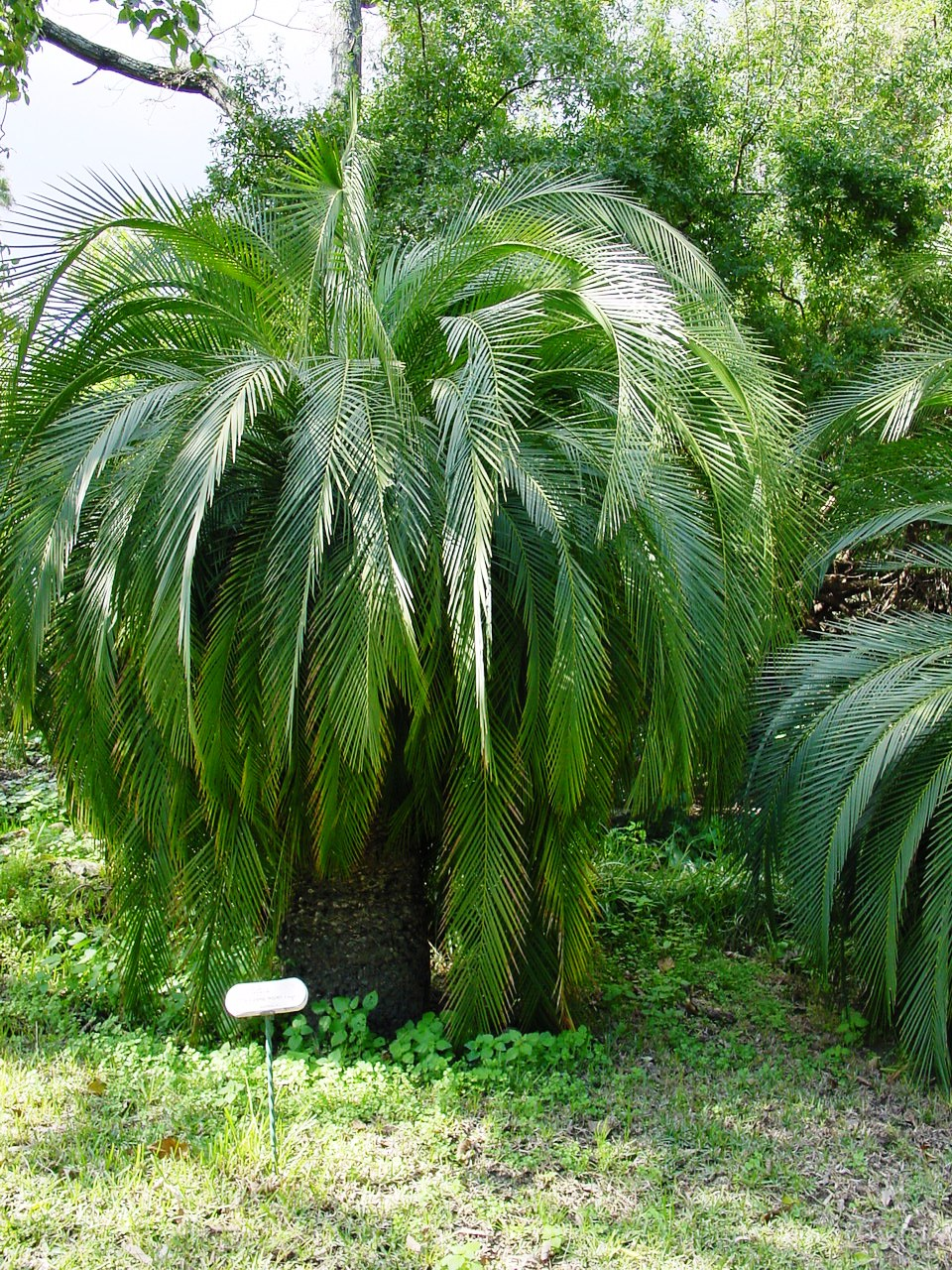

Conservation status
- Near Threatened (IUCN 3.1)

Scientific classification
- Kingdom: Plantae
- Clade: Tracheophytes
- Clade: Gymnospermae
- Division: Cycadophyta
- Class: Cycadopsida
- Order: Cycadales
- Family: Zamiaceae
- Genus: Macrozamia
- Species: M. moorei

Binomial name
- Macrozamia moorei F. Muell

= Macrozamia moorei =

Species of cycad

Macrozamia moorei is a cycad in the family Zamiaceae, native to Queensland (Australia).

The species was described by Ferdinand von Mueller in 1881, naming it after Charles Moore (1820–1905), director of the Royal Botanic Gardens, Sydney.

== Description ==
Macrozamia moorei is the tallest-growing species of Macrozamia, growing to 7 metres (23 ft) tall with a trunk 50–80 cm diameter. It has keeled leaves up to 2.5 metres (8.2 ft) long, with short petioles bearing numerous spines, and 120–220 leaflets, each leaflet 20–35 cm long and 5–10 mm broad.

Cultivation

The plant is cultivated by specialty plant nurseries as an ornamental plant.

== Gallery ==
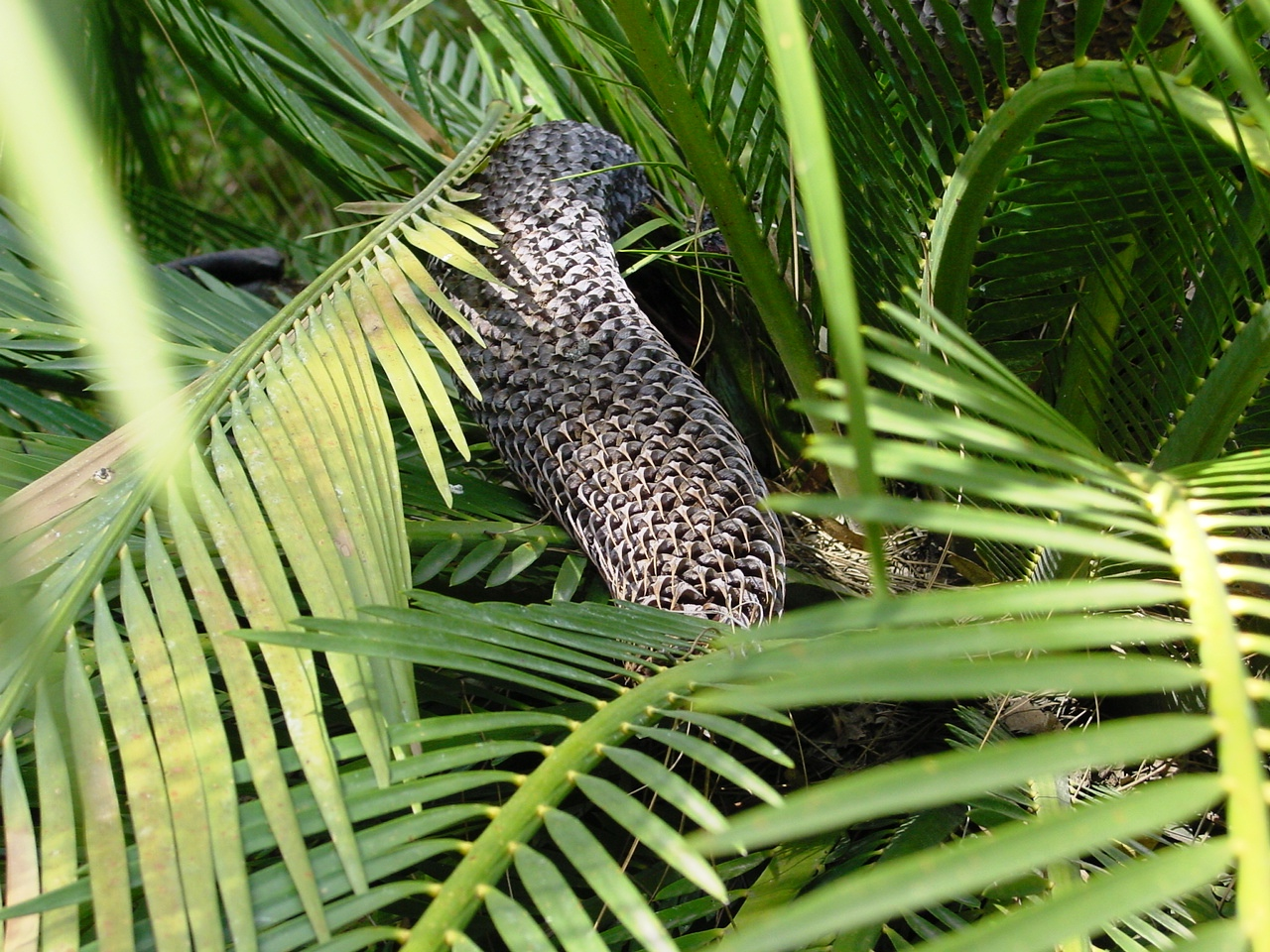
Macrozamia moorei - Pollen cone
