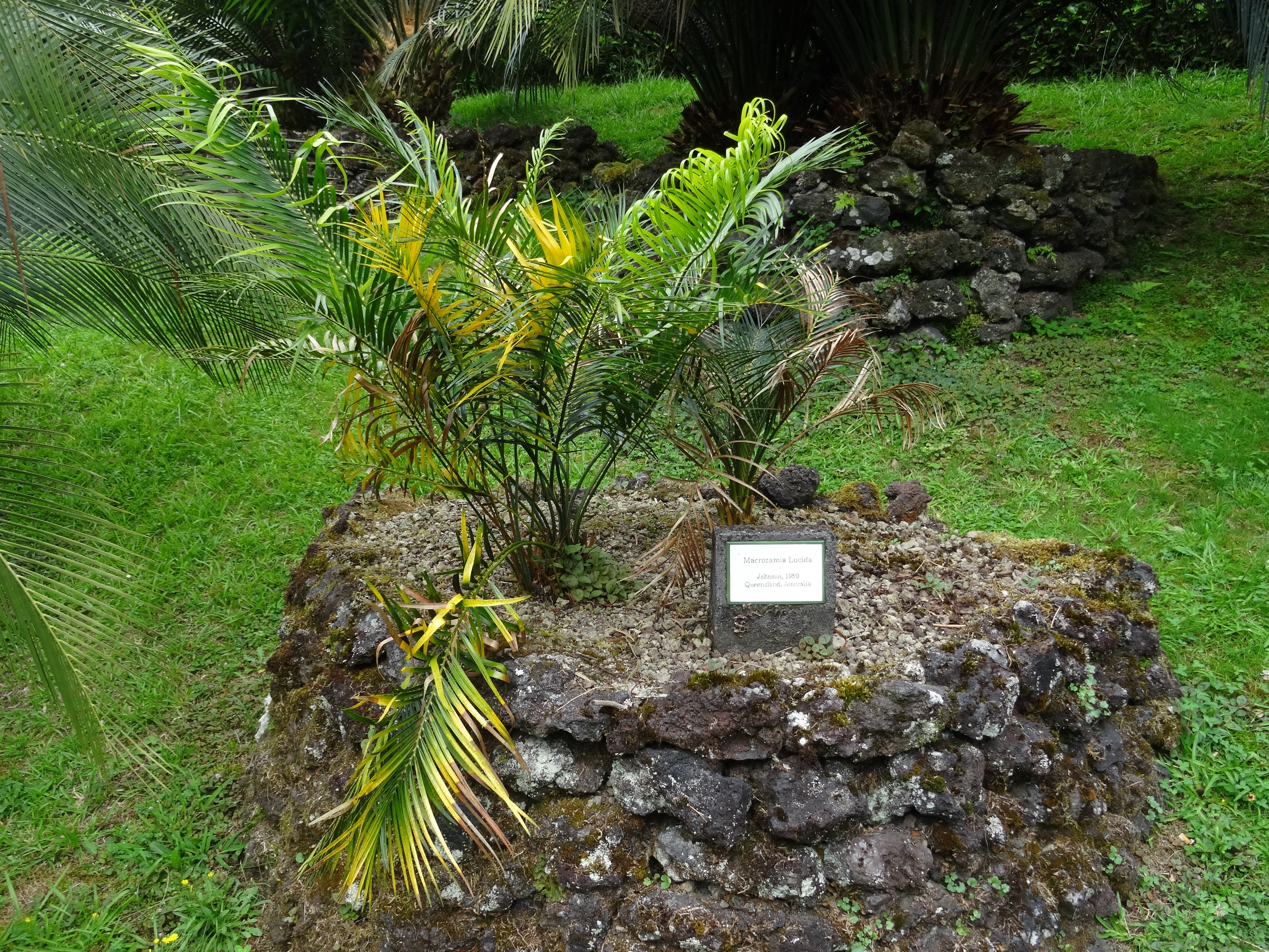

Conservation status
- Least Concern (IUCN 3.1)

Scientific classification
- Kingdom: Plantae
- Clade: Tracheophytes
- Clade: Gymnospermae
- Division: Cycadophyta
- Class: Cycadopsida
- Order: Cycadales
- Family: Zamiaceae
- Genus: Macrozamia
- Species: M. lucida

Binomial name
- Macrozamia lucida L.A.S.Johnson

= Macrozamia lucida =

Species of cycad

Macrozamia lucida is a species of plant in the family Zamiaceae. It is endemic to Australia.

== Distribution and habitat ==
This species is found in Southern Queensland, from around Brisbane north to Nambour, in coastal wet sclerophyll forest.
