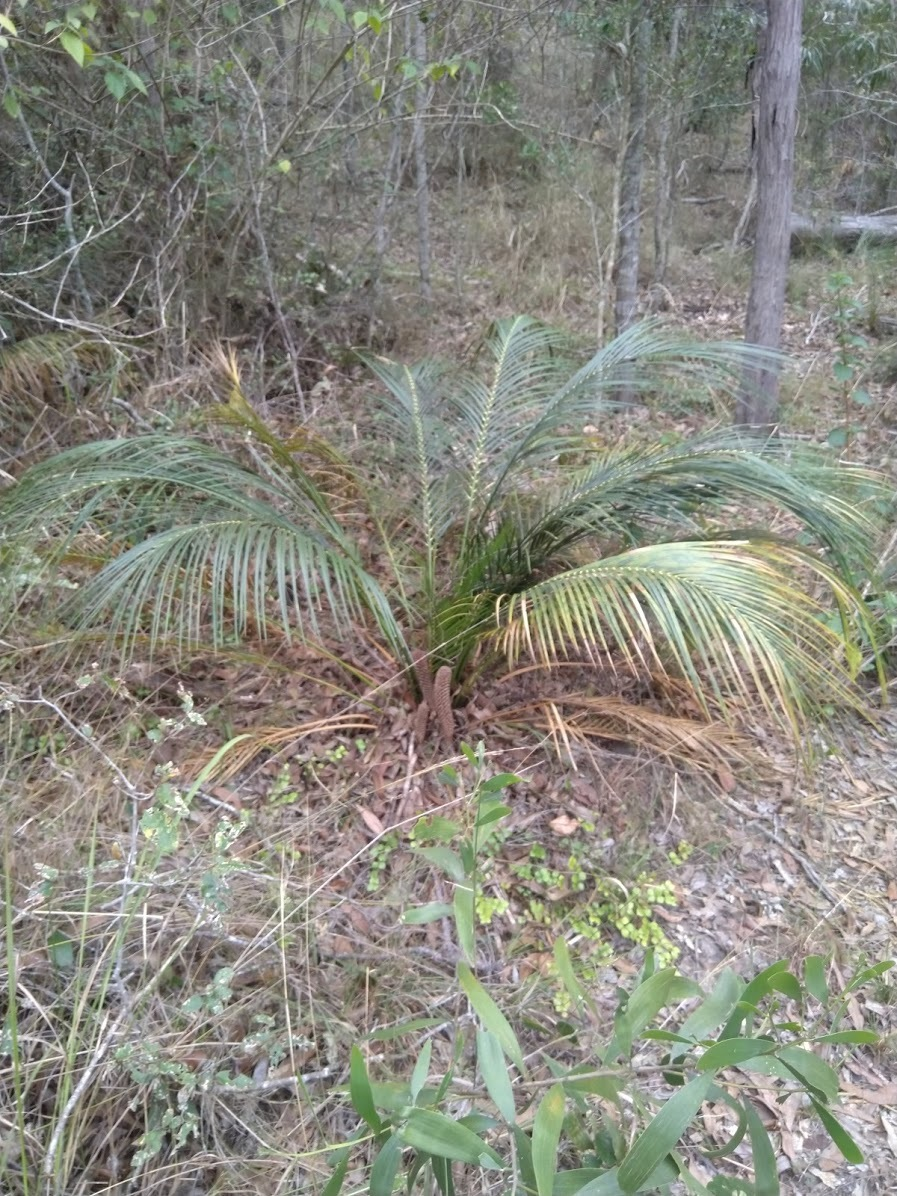

Conservation status
- Least Concern (IUCN 3.1)

Scientific classification
- Kingdom: Plantae
- Clade: Embryophytes
- Clade: Tracheophytes
- Clade: Gymnosperms
- Division: Cycadophyta
- Class: Cycadopsida
- Order: Cycadales
- Family: Zamiaceae
- Genus: Macrozamia
- Species: M. mountperriensis

Binomial name
- Macrozamia mountperriensis F.M.Bailey

Synonyms
- Macrozamia tridentata subsp. mountperriensis (F.M.Bailey) Schust.; Macrozamia tridentata subsp. mountperryensis J.Schust. orth. var.

= Macrozamia mountperriensis =

Species of cycad

Macrozamia mountperriensis is a species of plant in the family Zamiaceae endemic to the area around Mount Perry in Queensland, Australia; however, it is not considered threatened due to its large population in the area. The species was discovered by colonial botanists including Frederick Manson Bailey and James Keys in the late 1800s. All members of the Zamiaceae family are considered to be poisonous.

== Description ==
Macrozamia mountperriensis is distinguished from related species by its small stature and light green leaves. Leaves are pinnate with 50 to 110 leaflets. The stems range between 15–20 centimetres (5.9–7.9 in) in height, and the leaves are around 80 centimetres (31 in) long on average. Leaflets are straight, approximately 5-9 mm wide Leaves vary in colour depending on age: leaves are lighter green with yellow undertones, whilst the mature leaves are darker.

The plant is also distinguishable by cylinder cones growing from the root of the plant. Male cones are 30 centimetres (12 in) long and around 1.3 centimetres (0.5 in) in diameter. Female cones are 20–40 centimetres (7.9–15.7 in) inches long and have and 10 centimetres (3.9 in) in diameter. The cones have of small green and orange spots that distinguish Macrozamia mountperriensis from other plants in the Zamiaceae family. The seeds are approximately 25 mm long and 16 mm wide and are orange and yellow. Macrozamia mountperriensis is very similar to Macrozamia miquelii, but it can be distinguished by its longer petioles, smaller cones and seeds.

The plant also is known to contain symbiotic cyanobacteria and can be toxic. Insects, including those in the order Coleoptera, provide pollination to the plant.

== Taxonomy and naming ==
Macrozamia mountperriensis was first formally described in 1886 by Frederick Manson Bailey in the supplement to A Synopsis of the Queensland Flora from specimens collected on Mount Perry. Macrozamia mountperriensis name is derived from its discovery in Mount Perry, Queensland.

== Distribution and habitat ==
Macrozamia mountperriensis grows in the Mount Perry region west of Bundaberg. A number of plants from the macrozamia genus are common in this region and are found close to the town of Mount Perry. Other species of plants in the genus Macrozamia are endemic to other Australian states, including New South Wales and the Northern Territory. Other plants within the Zamiacae family are located in tropical regions such as North America, South America and Africa. The plant thrives in dry and warm conditions and habitat in temperatures above minus 6 degrees celsius. It typically grows in altitudes between two hundred and four hundred metres on slopes and ranges. Macrozamia mountperriensis is typically found in open forest conditions such as eucalypt forests or the Araucarian rainforest. The plant is also distributed in the townships of Brooweena, Biggenden and Aramara, which are near Mount Perry. Macrozamia mountperriensis shedding of pollen begins in later months of the year typically October and November. The plant's seeds shed in the months around Spring.

== Origins and history ==
It was first discovered by Colonial Botanist Frederick Manson Bailey and James Keys in 1886 whilst researching and surveying Queensland's flora. Frederick Manson Bailey published "A synopsis on Queensland Flora' in 1886 which first made light of Macrozamia mountperriensis, including an in-depth description of the plant, including details of its distribution in the Mount Perry Region. Botanist James Keys lived in the Mount Perry region researching the flora, and led to the discovery of Macrozamia mountperriensis.

== Conservation status ==
Macrozamia mountperriensis is listed as 'Special least concern' under the Queensland Government Nature Conservation Act 1992.

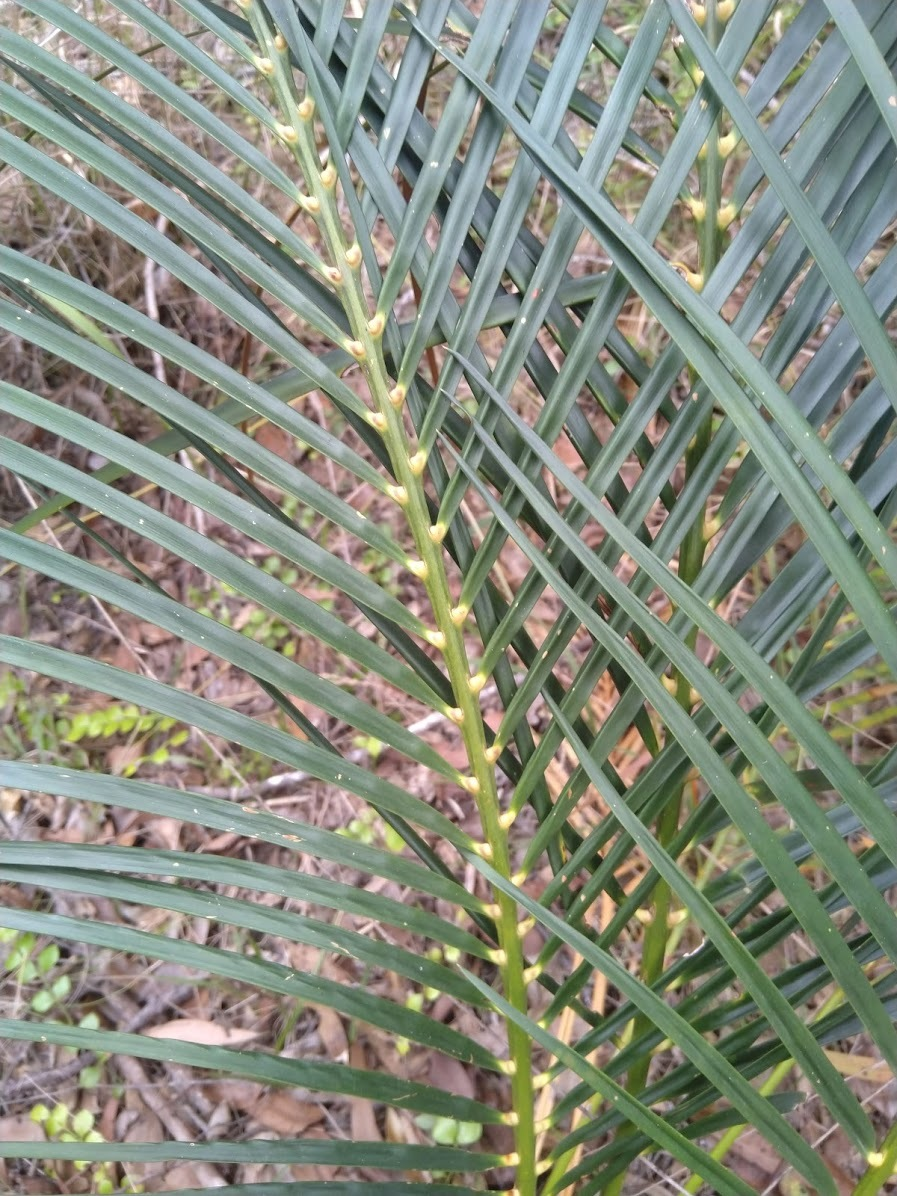
Leaves of male plant

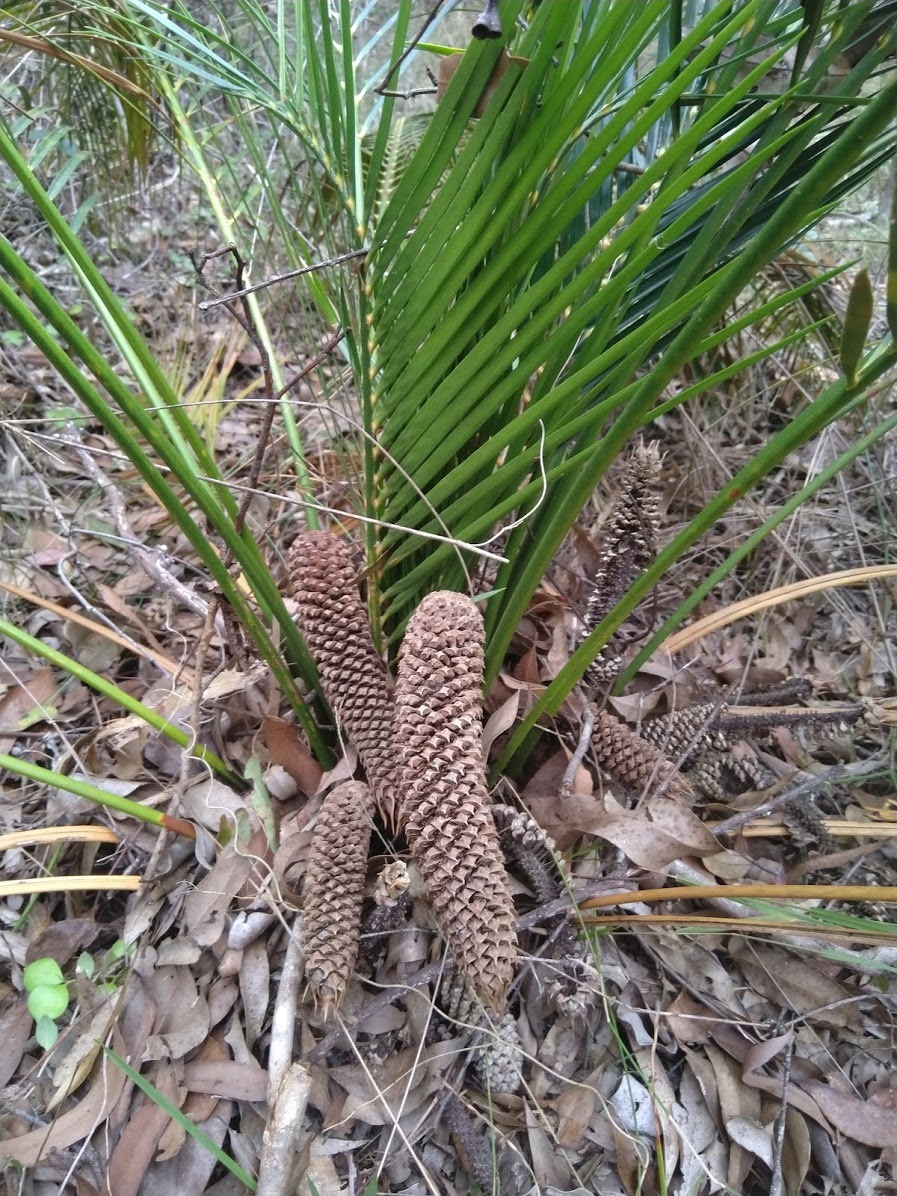
Cones of male plant

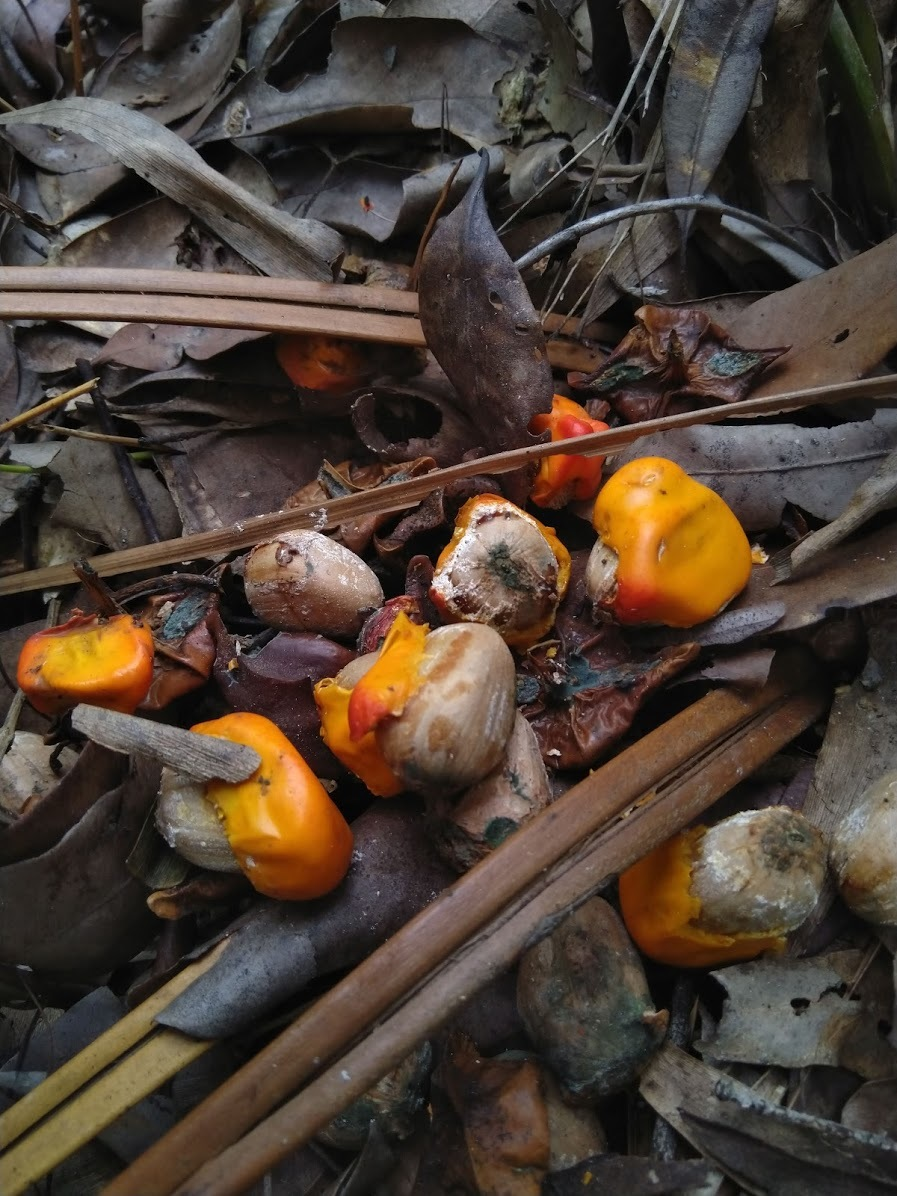
Cones of female plant

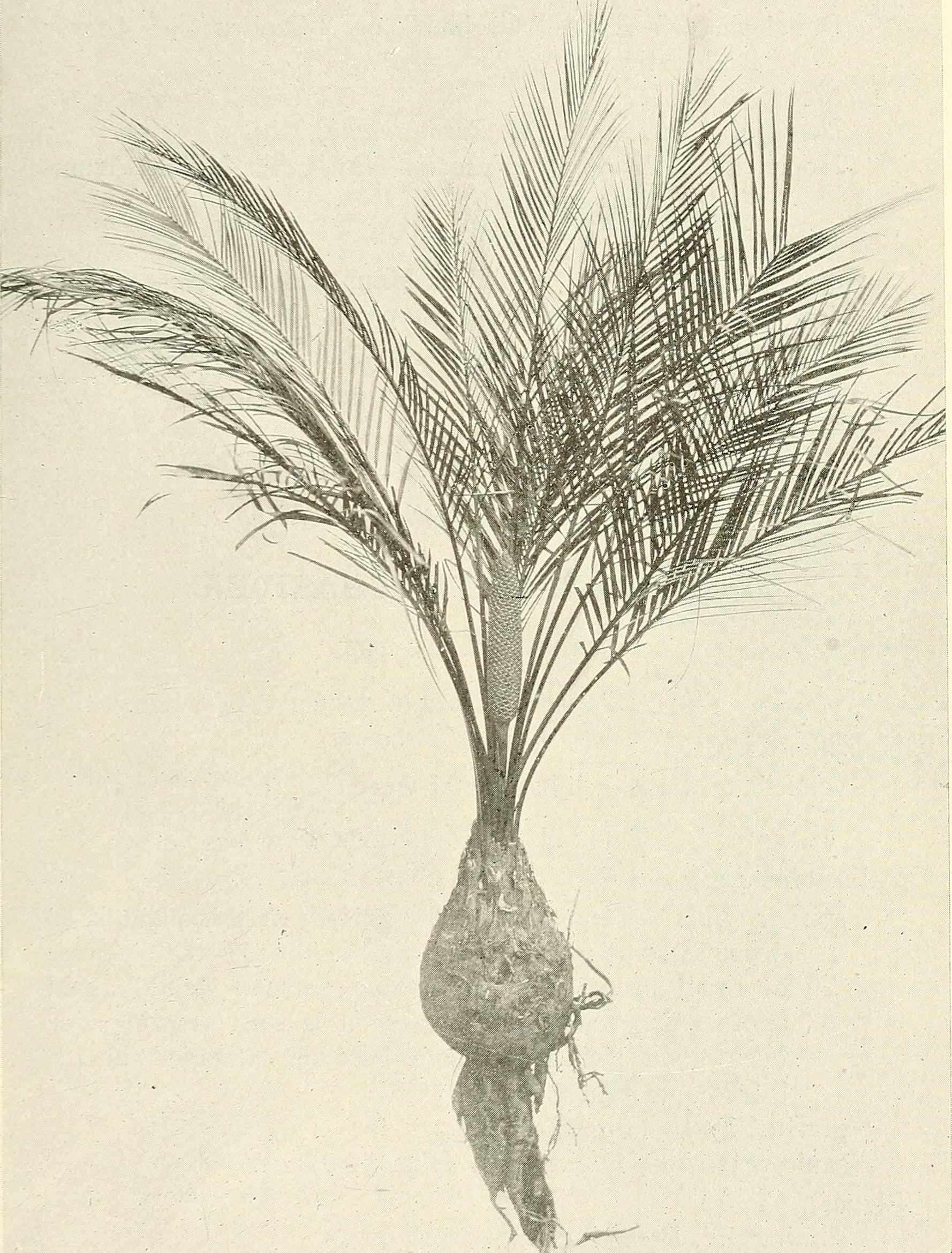
Female Plant
