= Macrozamia douglasii =

Conservation status
- Least Concern (IUCN 3.1)

Scientific classification
- Kingdom: Plantae
- Clade: Tracheophytes
- Clade: Gymnospermae
- Division: Cycadophyta
- Class: Cycadopsida
- Order: Cycadales
- Family: Zamiaceae
- Genus: Macrozamia
- Species: M. douglasii

Binomial name
- Macrozamia douglasii W.Hill ex F.M.Bailey

Species of cycad

Macrozamia douglasii is a species of plant in the family Zamiaceae. It is endemic to Queensland, Australia.
