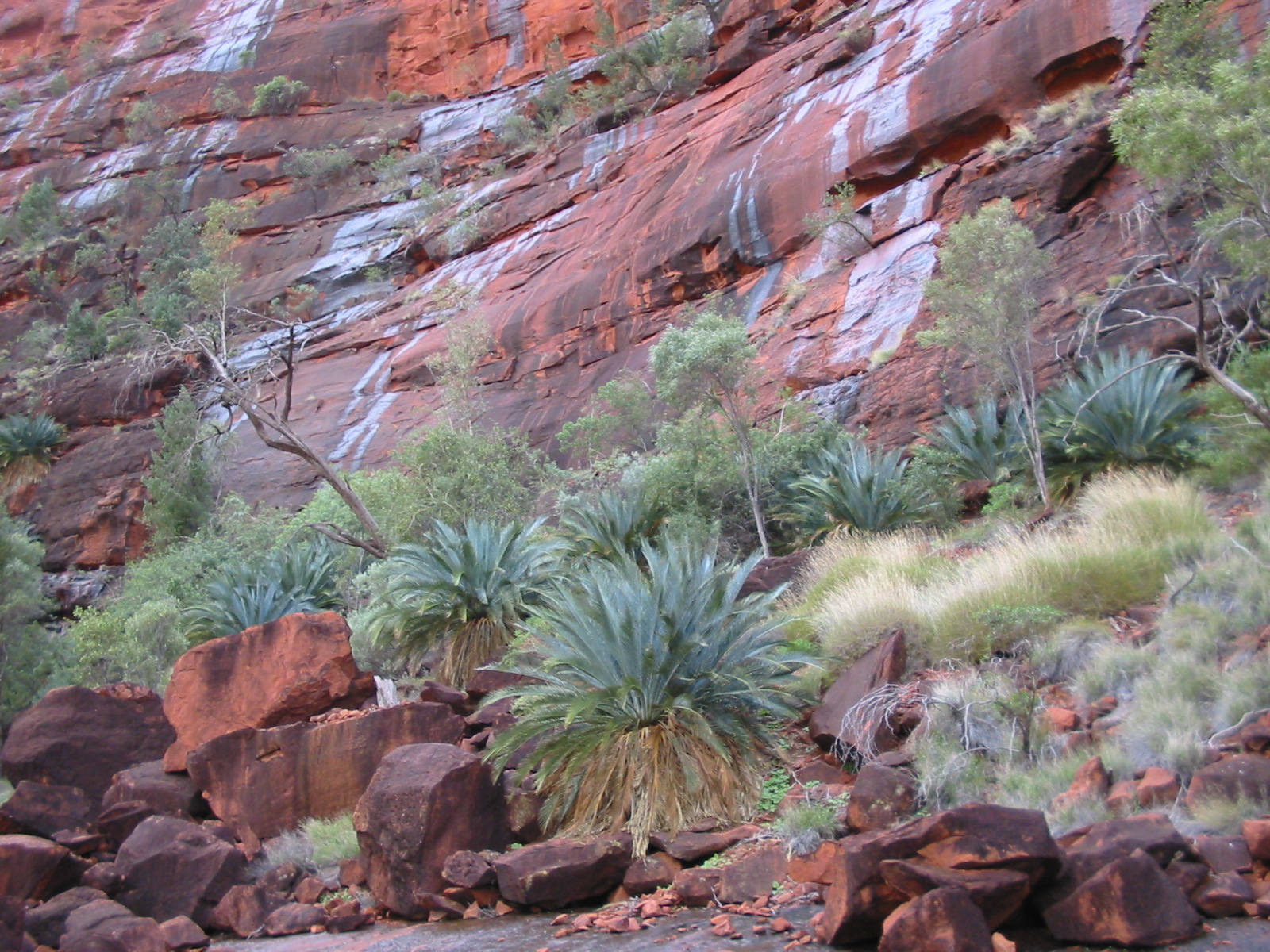
- Macrozamia macdonnellii
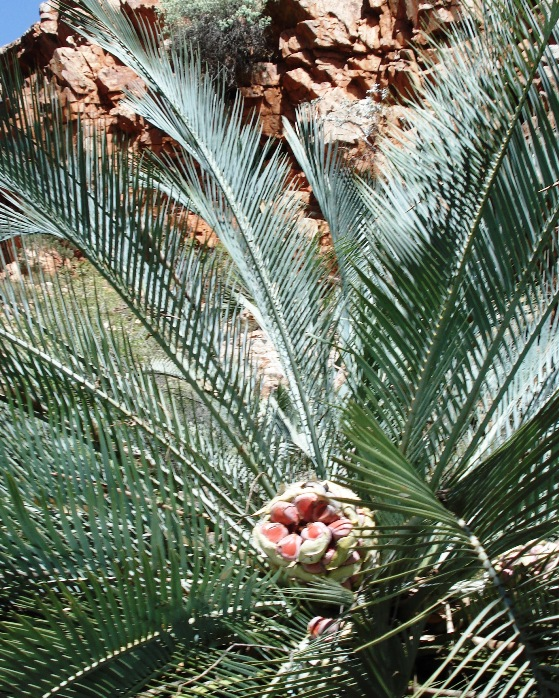

Conservation status
- Least Concern (IUCN 3.1)

Scientific classification
- Kingdom: Plantae
- Clade: Tracheophytes
- Clade: Gymnospermae
- Division: Cycadophyta
- Class: Cycadopsida
- Order: Cycadales
- Family: Zamiaceae
- Genus: Macrozamia
- Species: M. macdonnellii

Binomial name
- Macrozamia macdonnellii (F.Muell. ex Miq.) A.DC.
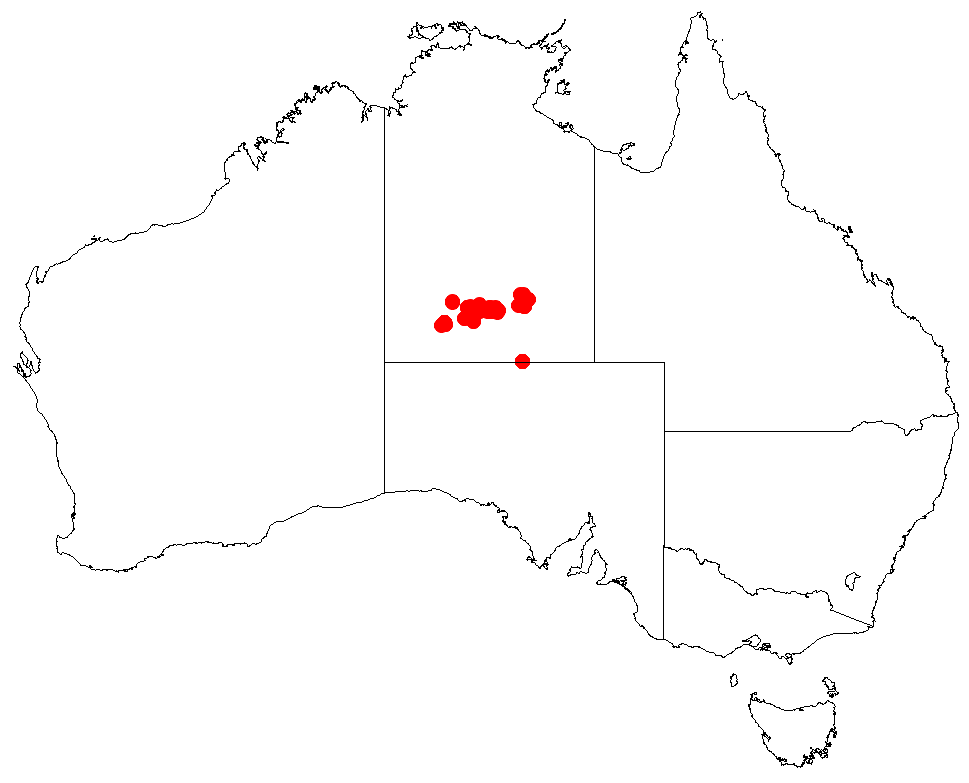
- Occurrence data from AVH

= Macrozamia macdonnellii =

Species of cycad

Macrozamia macdonnellii, common name MacDonnell Ranges Cycad, is a species of plant in the family Zamiaceae. It is endemic to the Northern Territory, Australia.

Macrozamia macdonnellii is not eaten by the Arrernte people of the Macdonnell Ranges due to the extensive process of toxin leaching that is required.

== Description ==
Macrozamia macdonnellii has large, frond-like pinnate bluish-green leaves which radiate from the top of a stocky trunk. The male and female reproductive cones are on separate plants, with the female cone being broader than the male and partially enclosing seeds the size of an egg which have a bright red outer layer (sarcotesta).

== Taxonomy ==
It was first named Encephalartos macdonnellii by Ferdinand von Mueller, and published by Miquel in Over de Cycadeen in Nieuw-Holland. Verslagen en Mededeelingen van de afdeeling Natuurkunde in 1863. In 1868, Alphonse Pyramus de Candolle reassigned it to the genus, Macrozamia, thereby giving it the name, Macrozamia macdonnellii.
