= Macrozamia montana =

Conservation status
- Least Concern (IUCN 3.1)

Scientific classification
- Kingdom: Plantae
- Clade: Tracheophytes
- Clade: Gymnosperms
- Division: Cycadophyta
- Class: Cycadopsida
- Order: Cycadales
- Family: Zamiaceae
- Genus: Macrozamia
- Species: M. montana

Binomial name
- Macrozamia montana K.D.Hill
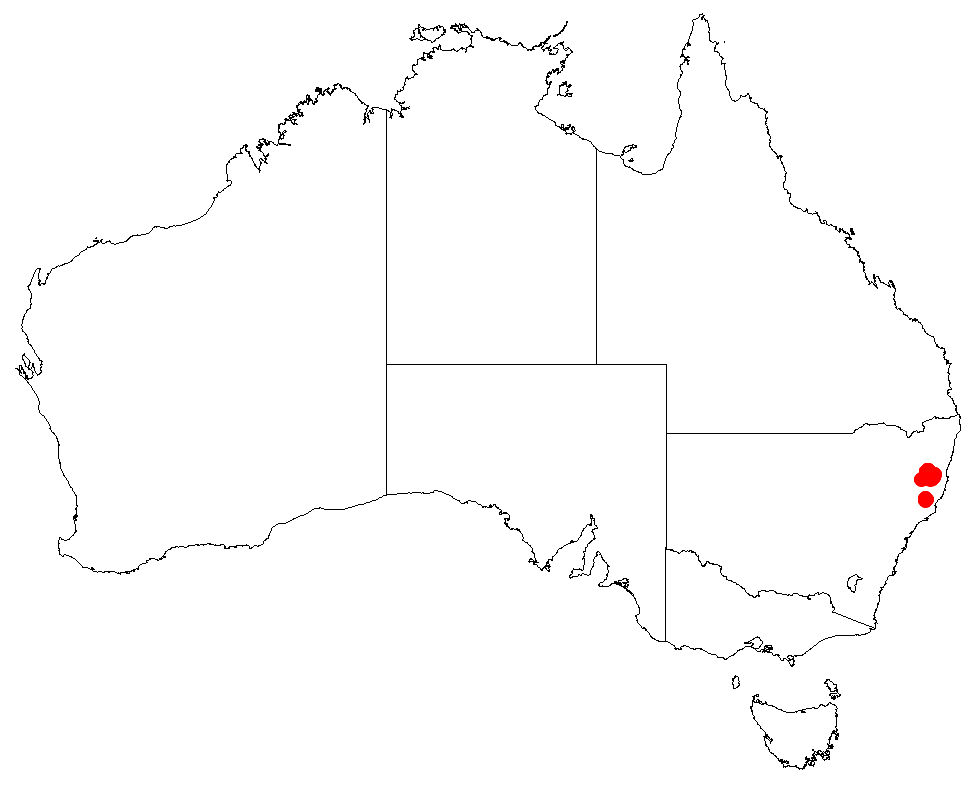
- Occurrence data from AVH

Species of cycad

Macrozamia montana is a species of plant in the family Zamiaceae. It is endemic to New South Wales, Australia.

== Etymology ==
Macrozamia montana is a distinct species that was named by Ken Hill in 1998 based on its attribute of growing on the sides of mountainous areas, slopes and steep ridges. The Latin specific epithet montana refers to mountains or coming from mountains.

== Description ==
Macrozamia montana is usually a subterrestrial woody stem but sometimes a short developing trunk whose bright green young fronds become dark green and bent when fully grown. During development, the female cones of M. montana have the tendency to change to a horizontal position or completely rest on the ground. It has short petioles of about 6–15 cm long. M. montana plants can have up to a maximum of 70 fronds and glossy leaves of about 100–204 cm long.

== Relationships ==
Macrozamia montana is part of the genus Macrozamia but is isolated from the rest of the genus. It is more closely related to larger M. communis plants in New South Wales, Australia than the smaller M. communis plants on the north of Newcastle. The petioles of the M. communis, however, grow to about 10–40 cm long which is far longer than those of the M. montana.

== Habitat conditions ==
Macrozamia montana grows under a eucalypt canopy, in wet sclerophyll forests on well-drained soils. It grows in areas which are exceedingly weeded especially by Lantana camara, a small perennial shrub.
