= Macrozamia machinii =

Conservation status
- Vulnerable (IUCN 3.1)

Scientific classification
- Kingdom: Plantae
- Clade: Tracheophytes
- Clade: Gymnospermae
- Division: Cycadophyta
- Class: Cycadopsida
- Order: Cycadales
- Family: Zamiaceae
- Genus: Macrozamia
- Species: M. machinii

Binomial name
- Macrozamia machinii P.I.Forst. & D.L.Jones

Species of cycad

Macrozamia machinii is a species of cycad in the family Zamiaceae endemic to Queensland, Australia. It is found near Inglewood in the Darling Downs area.
