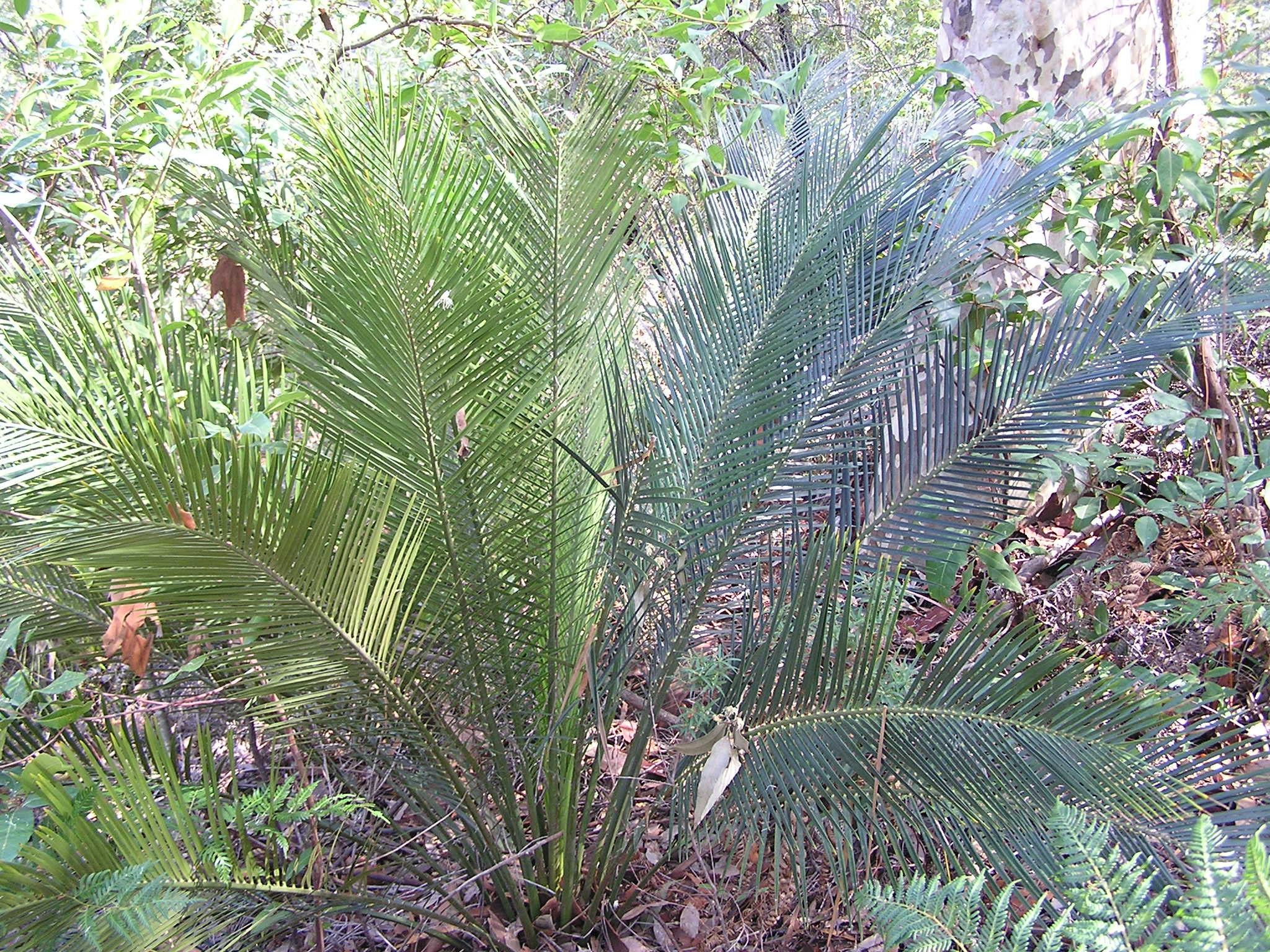
- Macrozamia communis

Scientific classification
- Kingdom: Plantae
- Clade: Embryophytes
- Clade: Tracheophytes
- Clade: Spermatophytes
- Clade: Gymnospermae
- Division: Cycadophyta
- Class: Cycadopsida
- Order: Cycadales
- Family: Zamiaceae
- Subfamily: Encephalartoideae
- Tribe: Encephalarteae
- Subtribe: Macrozamiinae
- Genus: Macrozamia; Miq.

Type species
- Macrozamia spiralis (Salisbury) Miquel

= Macrozamia =

Burrawang Temporal range: Late Cretaceous–Present

Genus of plants endemic to Australia

Macrozamia is a genus of around forty cycad species endemic to Australia. Many parts of the plant have been utilised for food and material, most of which is toxic if not processed correctly.

== Description ==
A genus of cycads with partially submerged bole or tree, small to medium height, bearing a crown of palm-like fronds. The dioecious plants bear large cones, becoming even larger when ripening on the female, containing reproductive parts of great size.

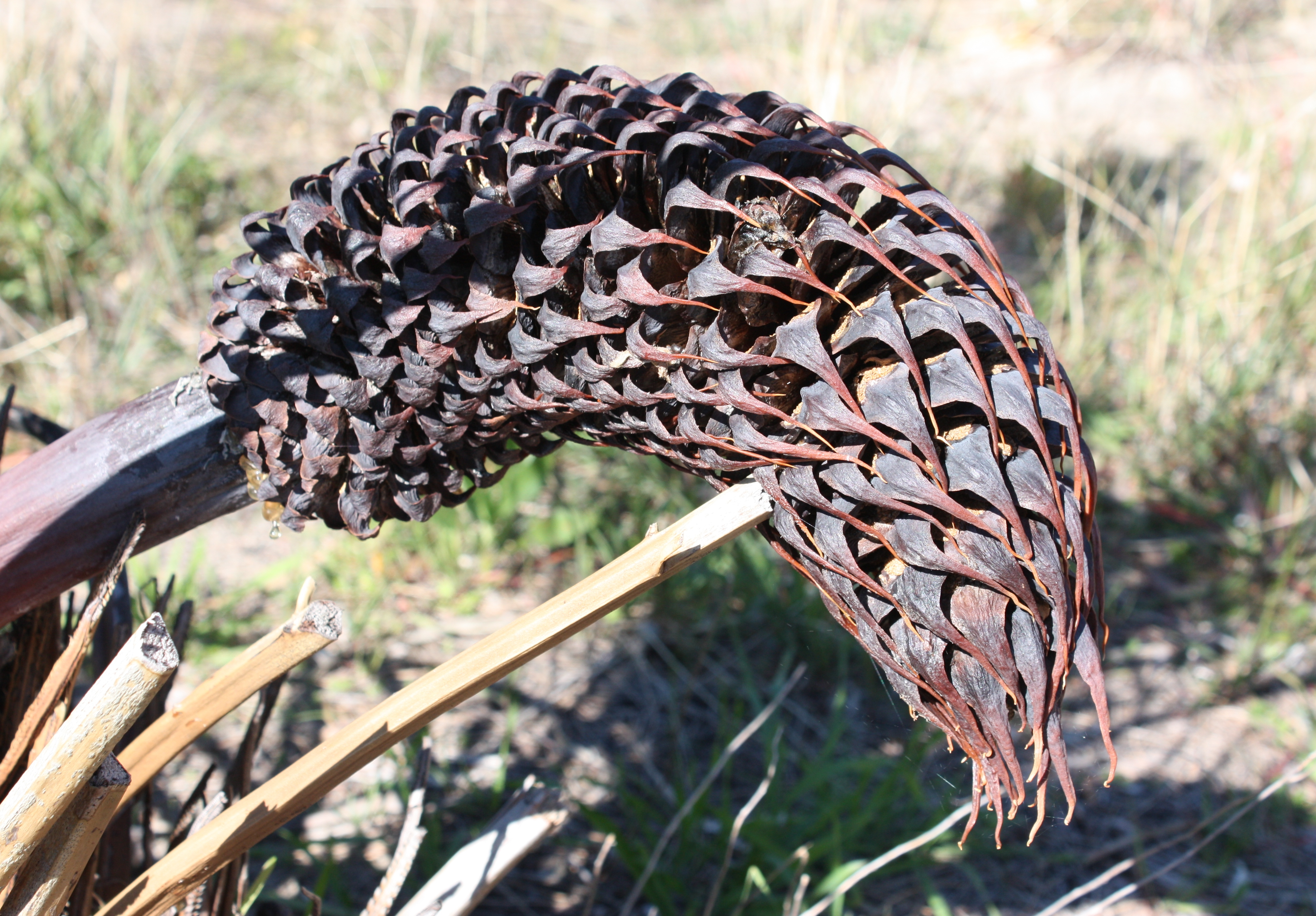
Macrozamia fraseri cone

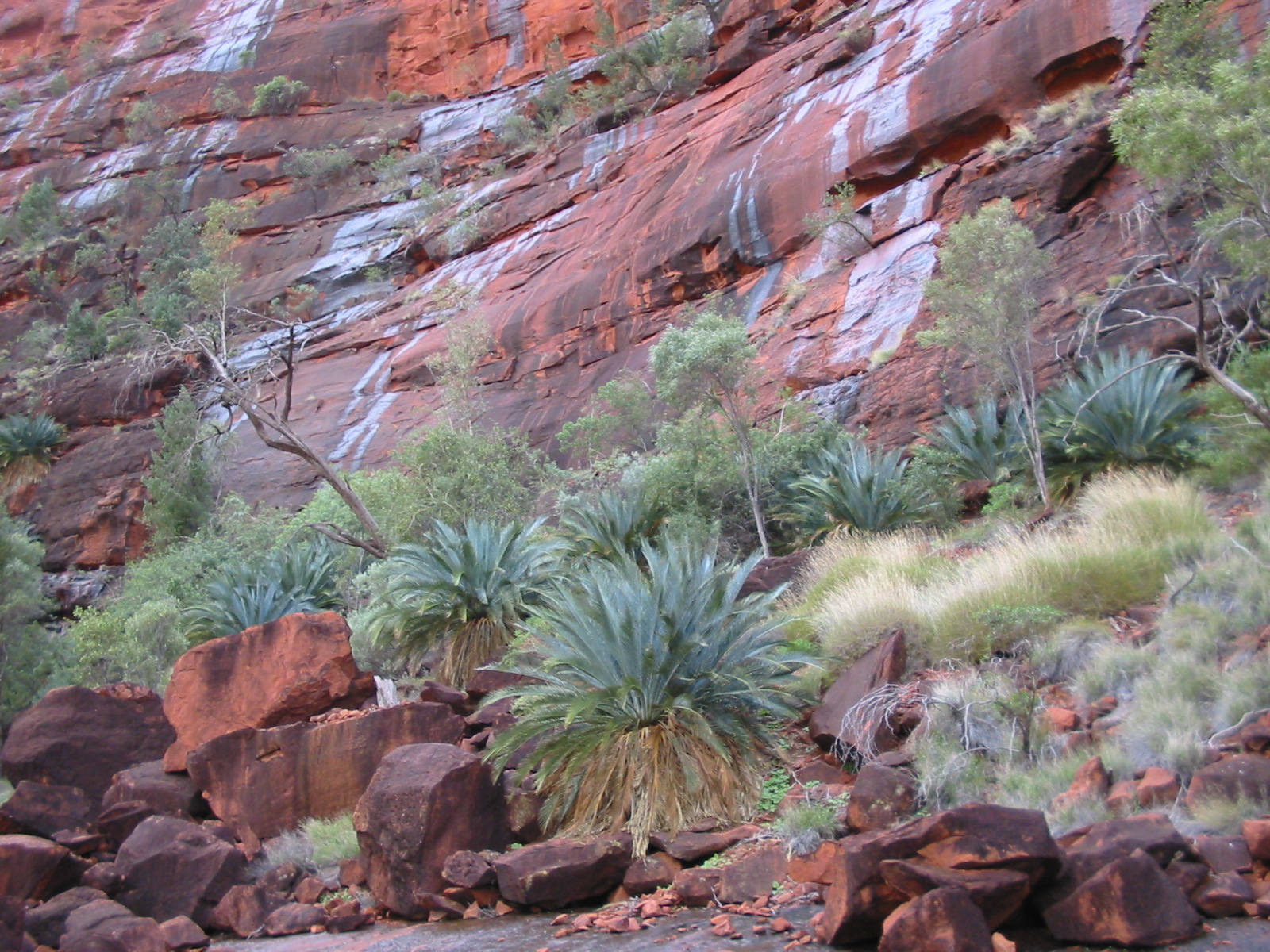
MacDonnell Ranges cycad (M. macdonnellii) in Cycad Gorge, Finke Gorge National Park, NT

== Taxonomy ==
The first description of the genus was published in 1842 by Friedrich Anton Wilhelm Miquel in his Monographia Cycadearum, without designating a type.

The common name "burrawang", originally referring to M. communis in the Daruk Australian Aboriginal language, is often used for all the species in the genus. Informal names published in state listing for the genus include 'rickets' (Bailey, 1931) in Queensland, a name also used in Western Australia for the symptoms of ingestion of species by cattle, and terms zamia, zamia palm, burrawang palm (Ross, 1989) and djeeri (Hopper, 2014) continued to be noted by New South Wales, QLD and W.A. authors in specific and generic usages.

Phylogeny of Macrozamia

- - M. lucida Johnson
  - - M. moorei von Mueller
    - - M. elegans Hill & Jones
      - - M. diplomera (von Mueller 1866) Johnson
        - - M. dyeri (von Mueller 1885) Gardner
          - - M. flexuosa Moore
            - - M. mountperriensis Bailey
              - - M. glaucophylla Jones
                - - M. communis Johnson
                  - M. polymorpha Jones

=== Species ===
Image	Scientific name	Distribution
	Macrozamia cardiacensis	southeast Queensland
	Macrozamia communis	east coast of New South Wales
	Macrozamia concinna	New South Wales
	Macrozamia conferta	southeast Queensland
	Macrozamia cranei	southeast Queensland
	Macrozamia crassifolia	southeast Queensland
	Macrozamia denisonii	southeast Queensland
	Macrozamia diplomera	New South Wales
	Macrozamia douglasii	southeast Queensland
	Macrozamia dyeri	southern coast of Western Australia
	Macrozamia elegans	New South Wales
	Macrozamia fawcettii	New South Wales
	Macrozamia fearnsidei	southeast Queensland
	Macrozamia flexuosa	New South Wales
	Macrozamia fraseri	southwestern Western Australia
	Macrozamia glaucophylla	New South Wales
	Macrozamia heteromera	New South Wales
	Macrozamia humilis	New South Wales
	Macrozamia johnsonii	New South Wales
	Macrozamia lomandroides	southeast Queensland
	Macrozamia longispina	southeast Queensland
	Macrozamia lucida	southeast Queensland
	Macrozamia macdonnellii	Macdonnell Ranges, Northern Territory
	Macrozamia machinii	Queensland
	Macrozamia macleayi	Queensland
	Macrozamia miquelii	southeast and central Queensland
	Macrozamia montana	New South Wales
	Macrozamia moorei	southeast and central Queensland
	Macrozamia mountperriensis	southeast Queensland
	Macrozamia occidua	southeast Queensland
	Macrozamia parcifolia	southeast Queensland
	Macrozamia pauli-guilielmi	southeast Queensland, northeast New South Wales
	Macrozamia platyrhachis	southeast Queensland
	Macrozamia plurinervia	southeast Queensland, northeast New South Wales
	Macrozamia polymorpha	New South Wales
	Macrozamia reducta	New South Wales
	Macrozamia riedlei	southwestern Western Australia
	Macrozamia secunda	New South Wales
	Macrozamia serpentina	southeast Queensland
	Macrozamia spiralis	New South Wales
	Macrozamia stenomera	New South Wales
	Macrozamia viridis	southeast Queensland

== Distribution ==
The greatest diversity of species occurs in eastern Australia, in southeast Queensland and New South Wales, with one species in the Macdonnell Ranges of Northern Territory and three in the southwest region of Australia.
