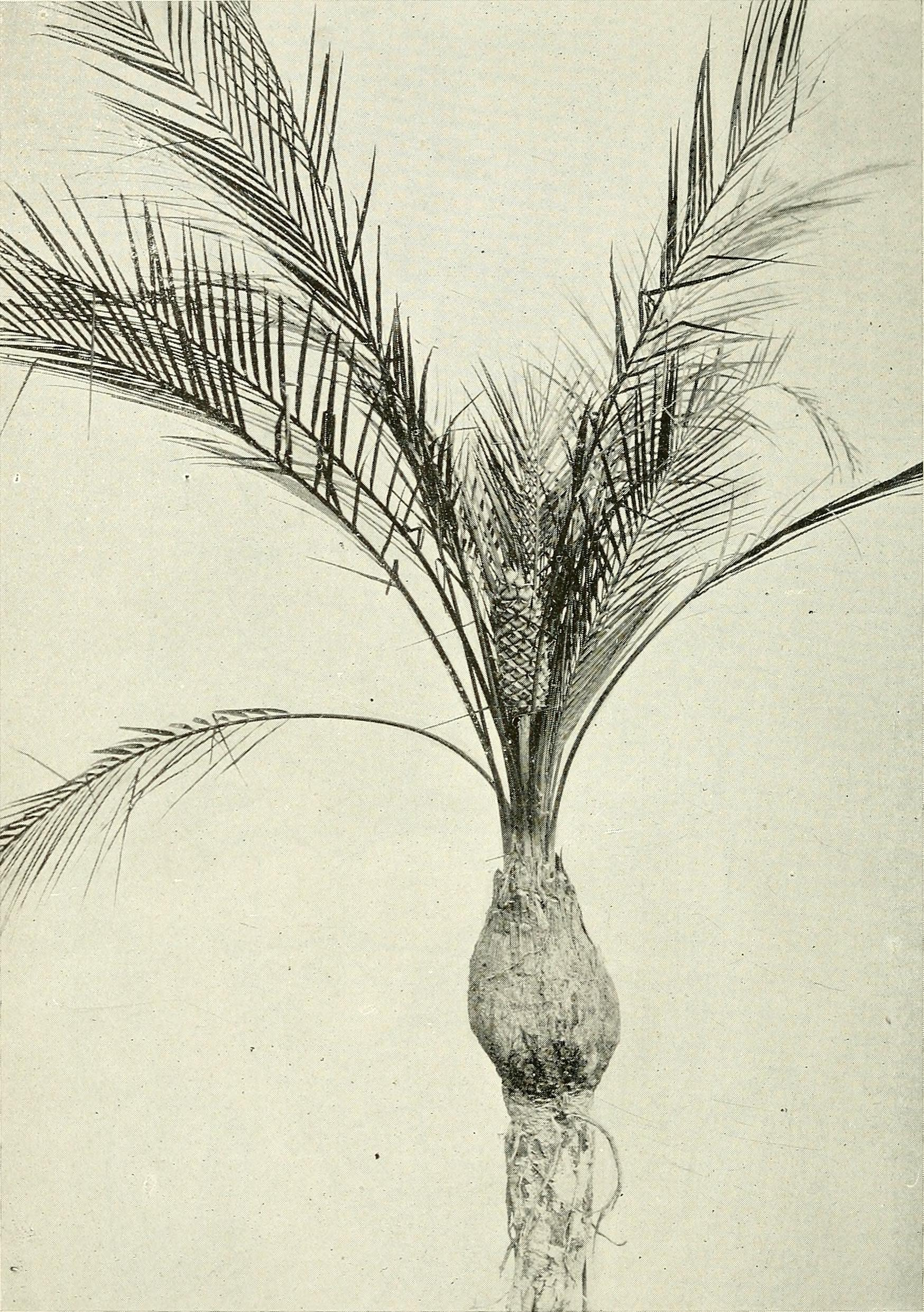

Conservation status
- Vulnerable (IUCN 3.1)

Scientific classification
- Kingdom: Plantae
- Clade: Tracheophytes
- Clade: Gymnospermae
- Division: Cycadophyta
- Class: Cycadopsida
- Order: Cycadales
- Family: Zamiaceae
- Genus: Macrozamia
- Species: M. platyrhachis

Binomial name
- Macrozamia platyrhachis F.M.Bailey

= Macrozamia platyrhachis =

Species of cycad

Macrozamia platyrhachis is a species of plant in the family Zamiaceae. It is endemic to Australia.
