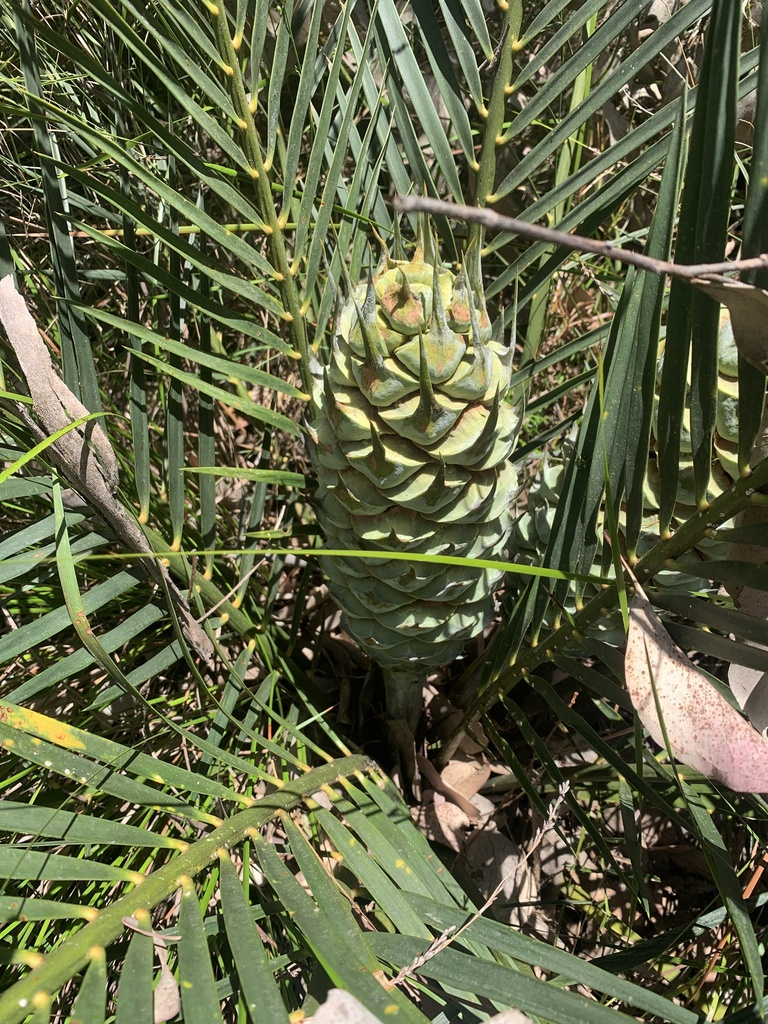

Conservation status
- Least Concern (IUCN 3.1)

Scientific classification
- Kingdom: Plantae
- Clade: Tracheophytes
- Clade: Gymnospermae
- Division: Cycadophyta
- Class: Cycadopsida
- Order: Cycadales
- Family: Zamiaceae
- Genus: Macrozamia
- Species: M. reducta

Binomial name
- Macrozamia reducta K.D.Hill & D.L.Jones
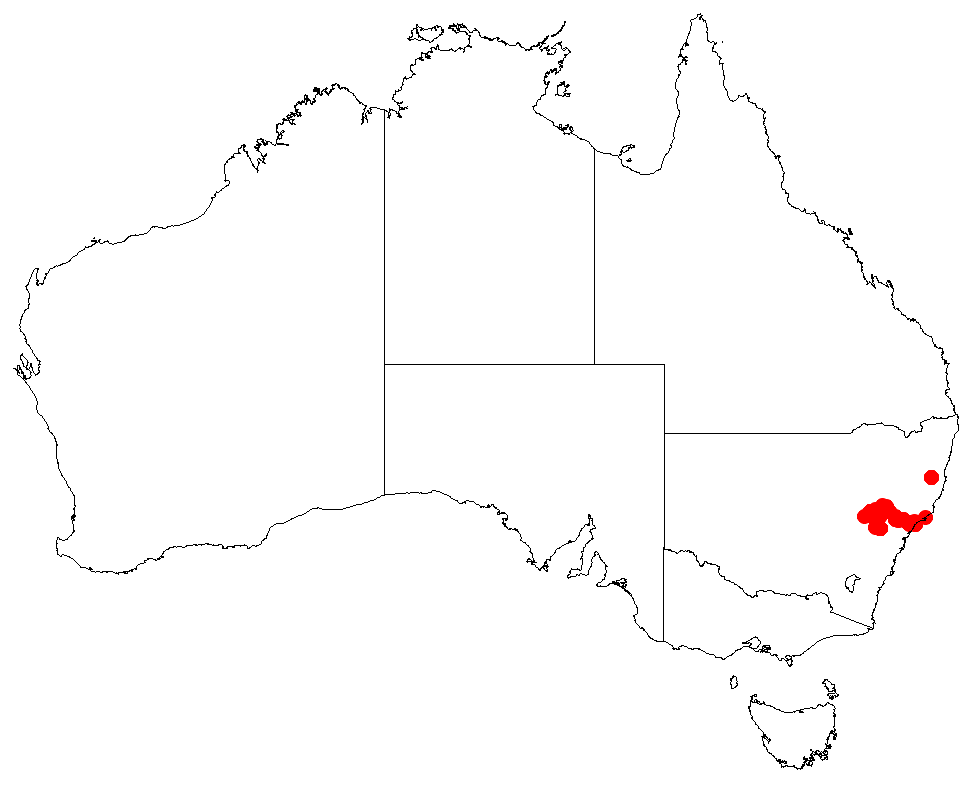
- Occurrence data from AVH

= Macrozamia reducta =

Species of cycad

Macrozamia reducta is a species of plant in the family Zamiaceae. It is endemic to New South Wales, Australia.
