= Macrozamia lomandroides =

Conservation status
- Endangered (IUCN 3.1)

Scientific classification
- Kingdom: Plantae
- Clade: Tracheophytes
- Clade: Gymnospermae
- Division: Cycadophyta
- Class: Cycadopsida
- Order: Cycadales
- Family: Zamiaceae
- Genus: Macrozamia
- Species: M. lomandroides

Binomial name
- Macrozamia lomandroides D.L.Jones

Species of cycad

Macrozamia lomandroides is a species of plant in the family Zamiaceae. It is endemic to Australia. Its natural habitat is subtropical or tropical dry forests.
