= Macrozamia humilis =

Conservation status
- Vulnerable (IUCN 3.1)

Scientific classification
- Kingdom: Plantae
- Clade: Tracheophytes
- Clade: Gymnospermae
- Division: Cycadophyta
- Class: Cycadopsida
- Order: Cycadales
- Family: Zamiaceae
- Genus: Macrozamia
- Species: M. humilis

Binomial name
- Macrozamia humilis D.L.Jones
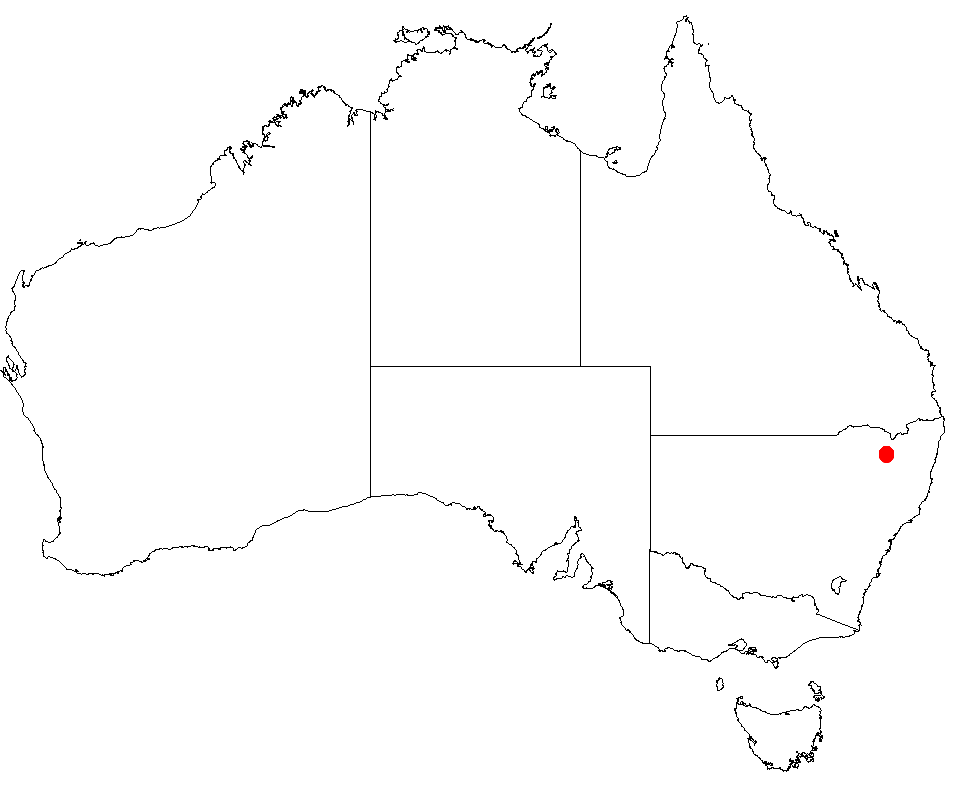
- Occurrence data from AVH

Species of cycad

Macrozamia humilis is a species of plant in the family Zamiaceae. It is endemic to Inverell in New South Wales, Australia. Its natural habitat is on granite soils in temperate shrubby woodland forests.
