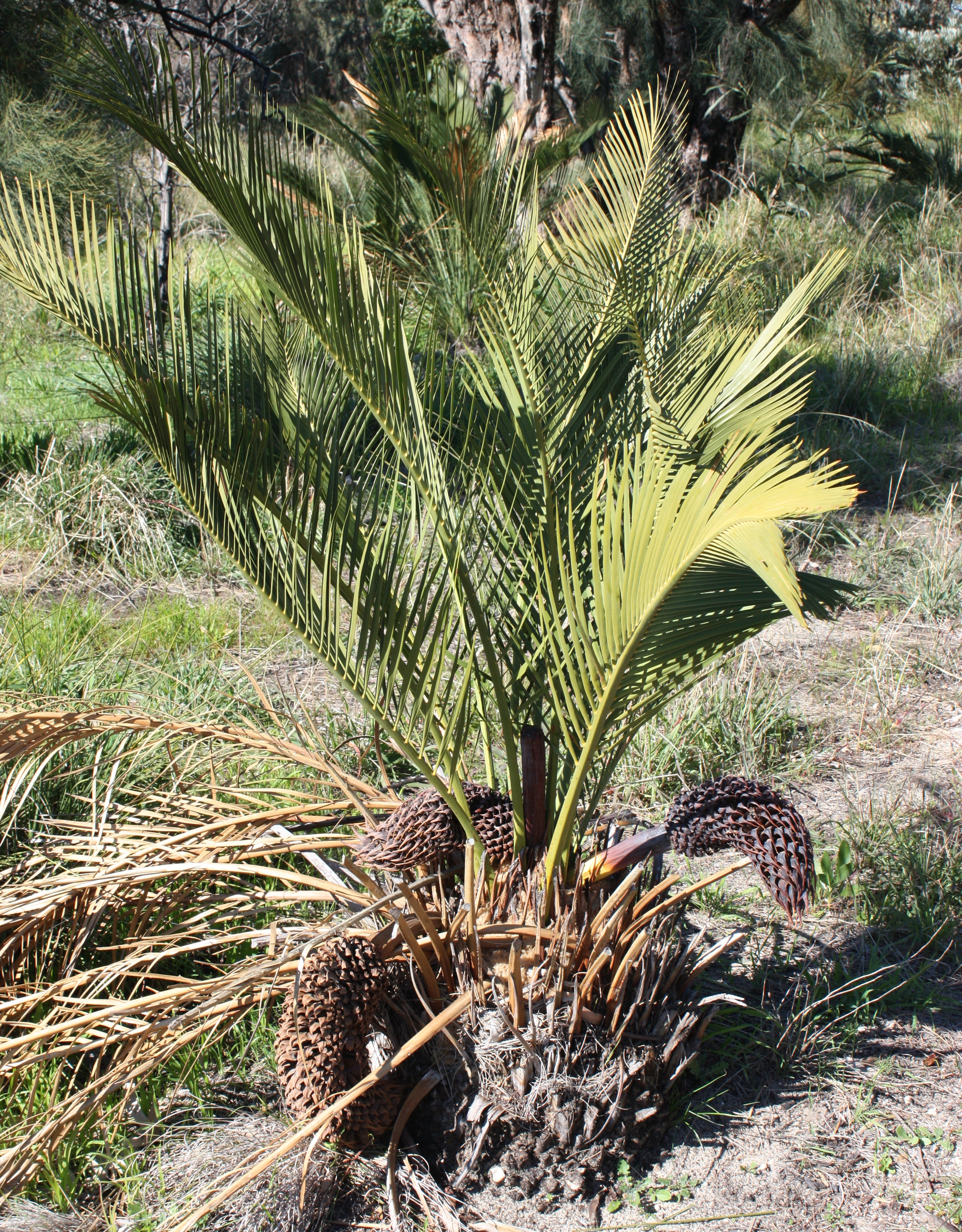

Conservation status
- Least Concern (IUCN 3.1)

Scientific classification
- Kingdom: Plantae
- Clade: Tracheophytes
- Clade: Gymnospermae
- Division: Cycadophyta
- Class: Cycadopsida
- Order: Cycadales
- Family: Zamiaceae
- Genus: Macrozamia
- Species: M. fraseri

Binomial name
- Macrozamia fraseri Miq.
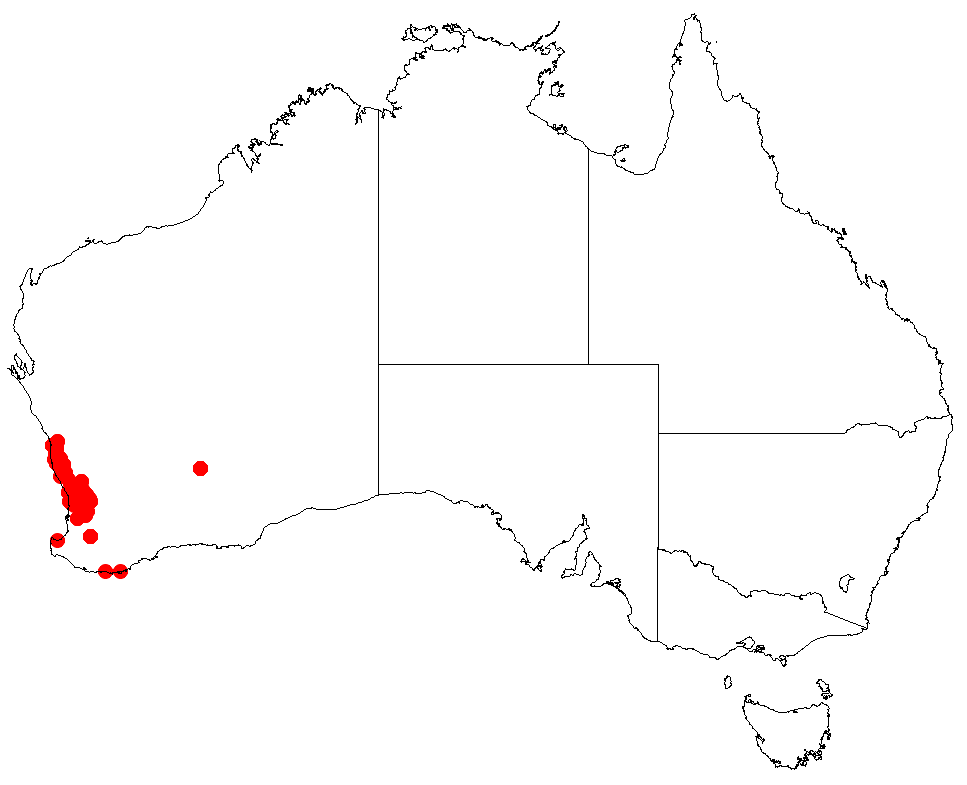
- Occurrence data from AVH

= Macrozamia fraseri =

Species of cycad

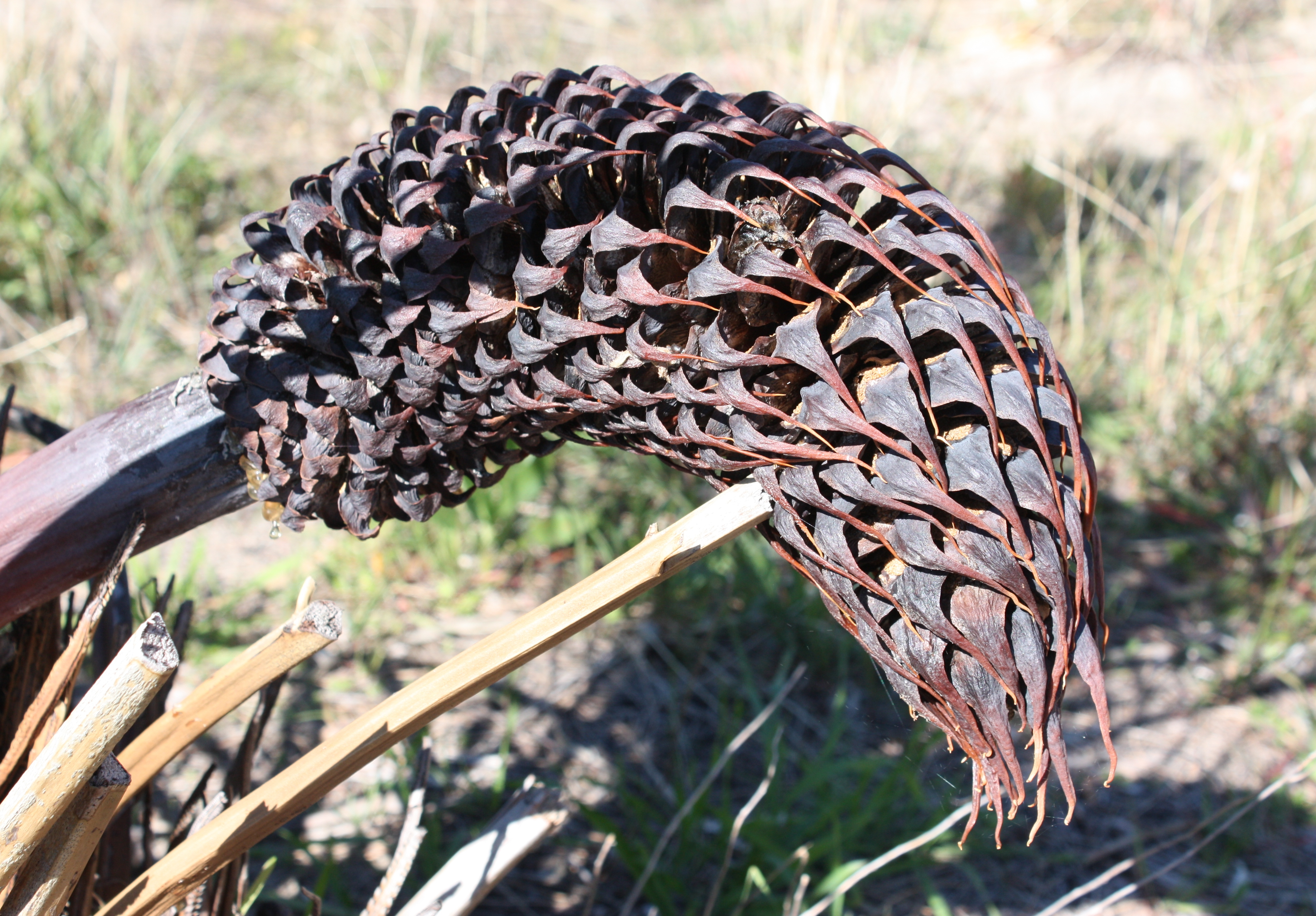
Closeup of cone

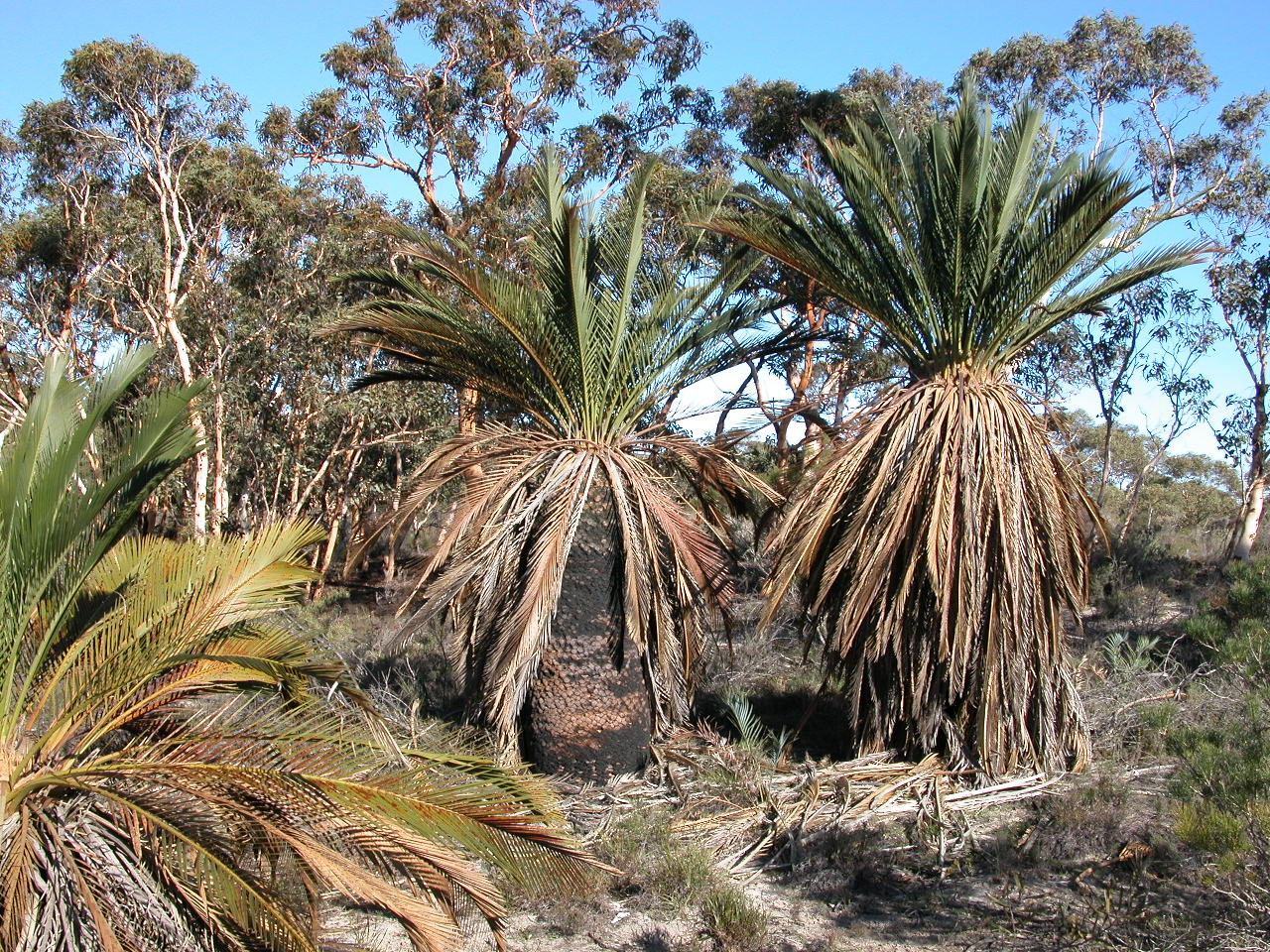
Large specimens in Coomallo Nature Reserve

Macrozamia fraseri is a species of plant in the family Zamiaceae. It is endemic to the south west of Western Australia, and restricted largely to the sandy soils of the Swan Coastal Plain and Geraldton Sandplains. The range of Macrozamia fraseri overlaps that of Macrozamia riedlei. The Noongar peoples know the plant as djiridji.

== Taxonomy ==
The species was first described by Friedrich Anton Wilhelm Miquel.

== Description ==
The form of the species is a low-trunked cycad or upright tree, being highly variable. Leaves are dull and distinctly keeled, leaflets are medium or small. The species grows in low heath, without jarrah (Eucalyptus marginata), on sand. Macrozamia fraseri is typical of cycads in being slow-growing, perennial, evergreen and dioecious. The trunk of old plants can be over a metre in height, with a surface burnt by bush fires of the past. The trunk is thick for a cycad, up to 105 cm (41 in) in diameter.

Macrozamia fraseri contains poisonous glycosides known as cycasins.
