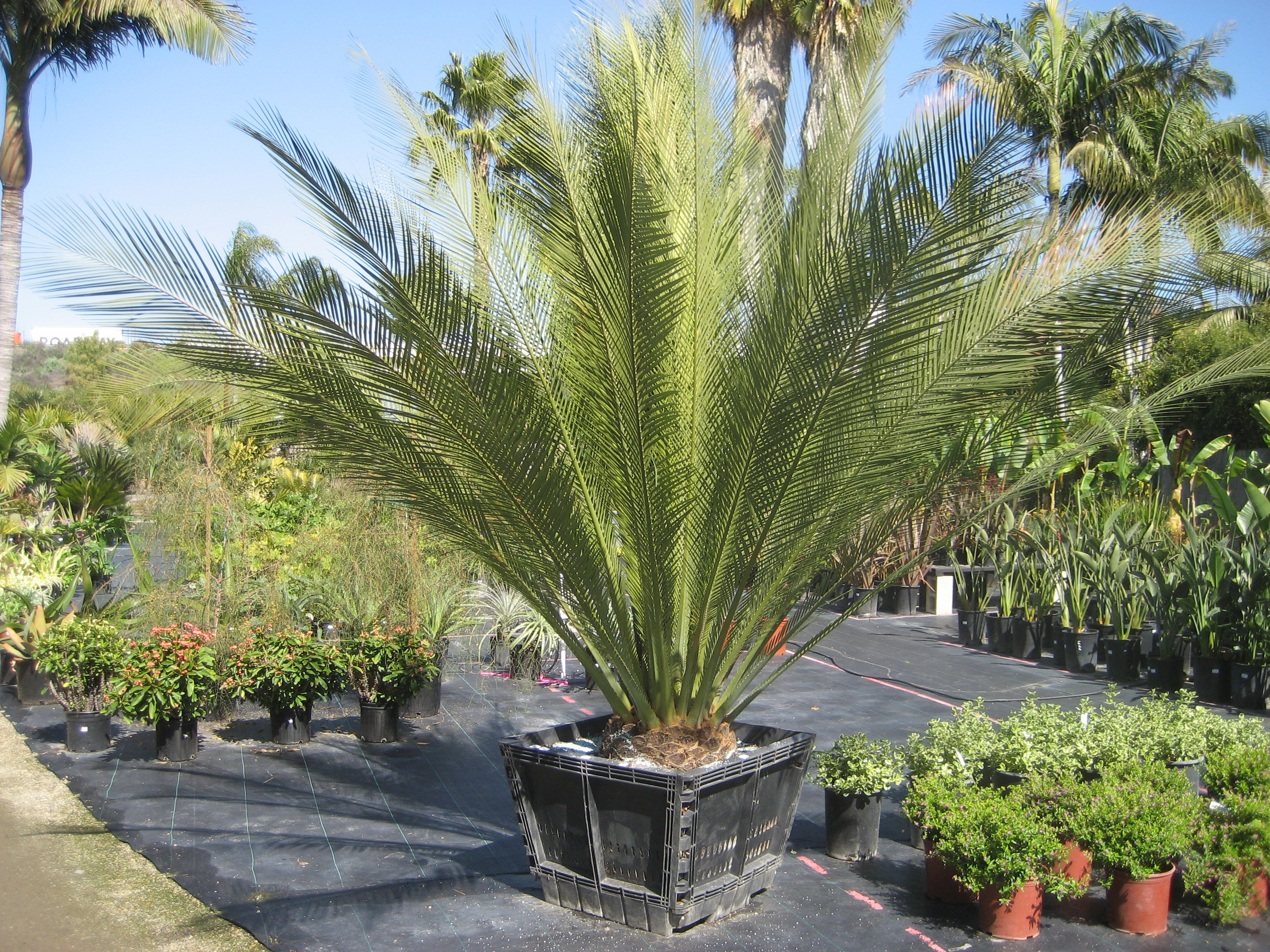
- Macrozamia johnsonii specimen for sale at a nursery in Capistrano Beach, California

Conservation status
- Least Concern (IUCN 3.1)

Scientific classification
- Kingdom: Plantae
- Clade: Tracheophytes
- Clade: Gymnospermae
- Division: Cycadophyta
- Class: Cycadopsida
- Order: Cycadales
- Family: Zamiaceae
- Genus: Macrozamia
- Species: M. johnsonii

Binomial name
- Macrozamia johnsonii D.L.Jones & K.D.Hill
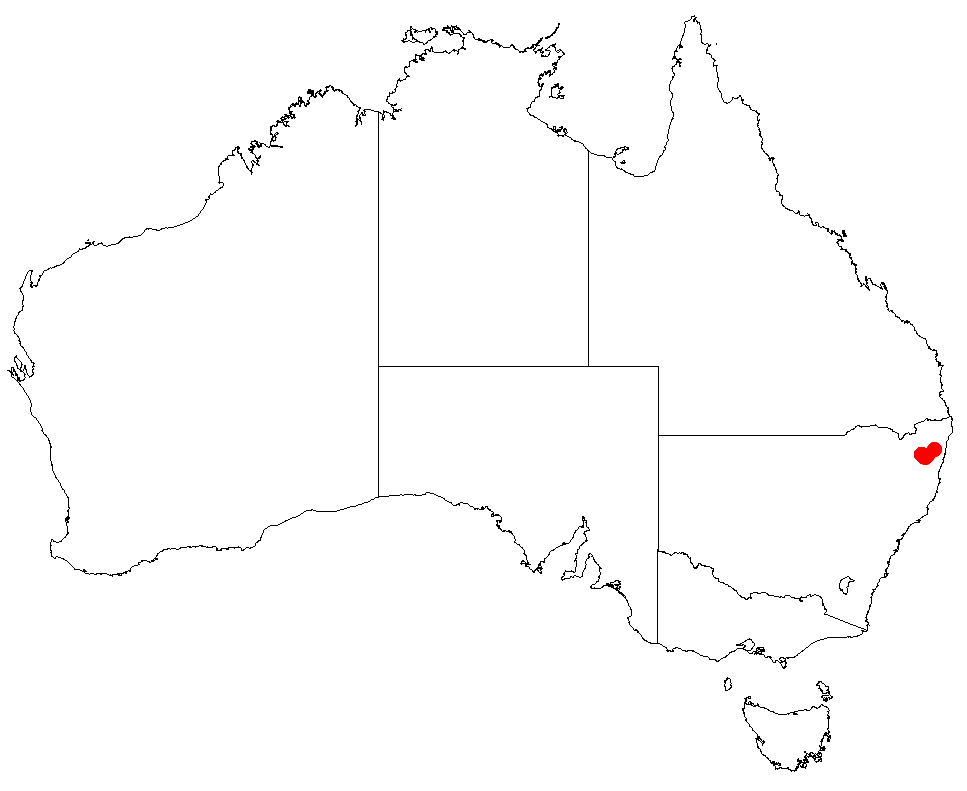
- Distribution within Australia (red)

= Macrozamia johnsonii =

Species of cycad

Macrozamia johnsonii is a species of cycad in the family Zamiaceae. It is endemic to New South Wales, Australia.
