= Macrozamia viridis =

Conservation status
- Endangered (IUCN 3.1)

Scientific classification
- Kingdom: Plantae
- Clade: Tracheophytes
- Clade: Gymnospermae
- Division: Cycadophyta
- Class: Cycadopsida
- Order: Cycadales
- Family: Zamiaceae
- Genus: Macrozamia
- Species: M. viridis

Binomial name
- Macrozamia viridis D.L.Jones & P.I.Forst.

Species of cycad

Macrozamia viridis is a species of plant in the family Zamiaceae. It is endemic to Australia

== Biology ==
The fact that Macrozamia viridis has an occurrence at only two locations means that it qualifies for Endangered status. The population trend of the species is now decreasing. They can also be found in terrestrial environments.

== Location ==
Macrozamia viridis can be found at the Wyberba and Girraween area in the south of the Darling Downs district of Queensland, Australia. This species of plants grow on sandy soils over granite in moderately wet eucalypt woodlands.
