= Macrozamia plurinervia =

Conservation status
- Endangered (IUCN 3.1)

Scientific classification
- Kingdom: Plantae
- Clade: Tracheophytes
- Clade: Gymnospermae
- Division: Cycadophyta
- Class: Cycadopsida
- Order: Cycadales
- Family: Zamiaceae
- Genus: Macrozamia
- Species: M. plurinervia

Binomial name
- Macrozamia plurinervia (L.Johnson) D.L.Jones
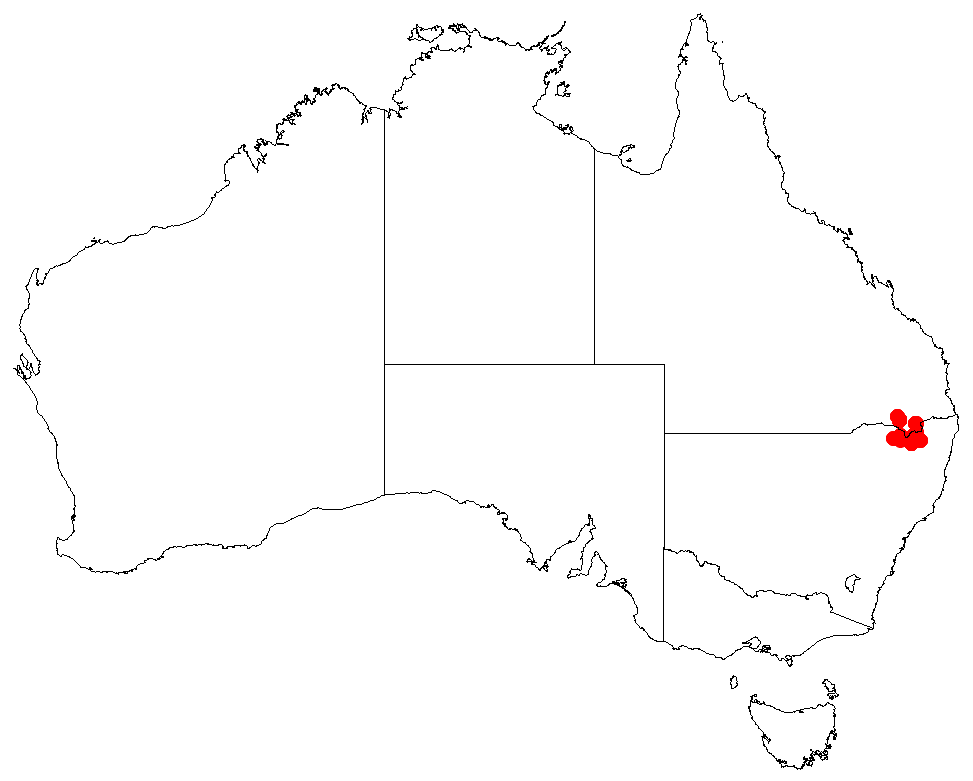
- Occurrence data from AVH

Species of cycad

Macrozamia plurinervia is a species of plant in the family Zamiaceae. It is endemic to Australia. Its natural habitat is subtropical or tropical dry forests.
