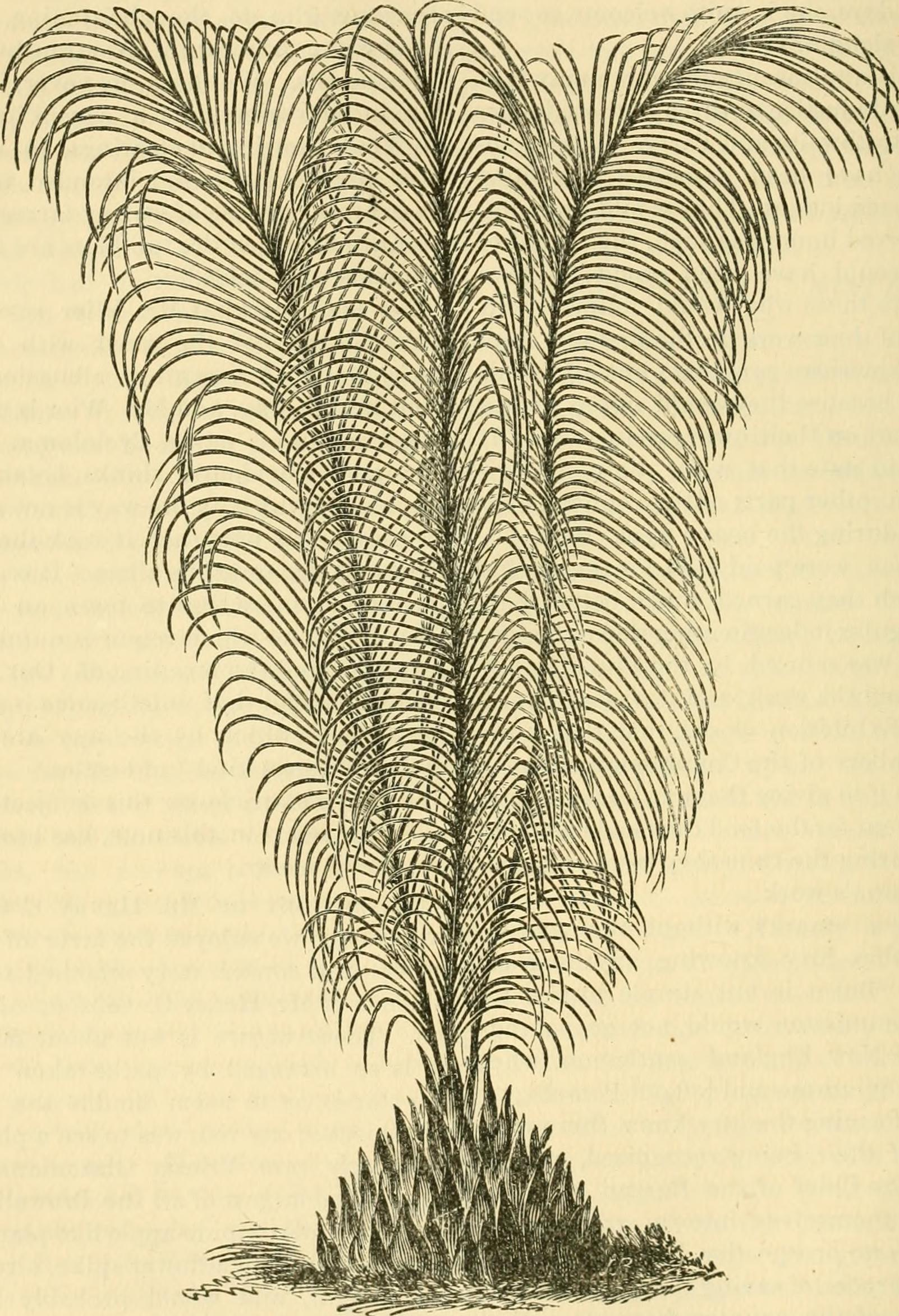

Conservation status
- Endangered (IUCN 3.1)

Scientific classification
- Kingdom: Plantae
- Clade: Tracheophytes
- Clade: Gymnospermae
- Division: Cycadophyta
- Class: Cycadopsida
- Order: Cycadales
- Family: Zamiaceae
- Genus: Macrozamia
- Species: M. pauli-guilielmi

Binomial name
- Macrozamia pauli-guilielmi W.Hill & F.Muell.

= Macrozamia pauli-guilielmi =

Species of cycad

Macrozamia pauli-guilielmi is a species of plant in the family Zamiaceae. It is endemic to Australia.
