= Micaela Ruiz Téllez =

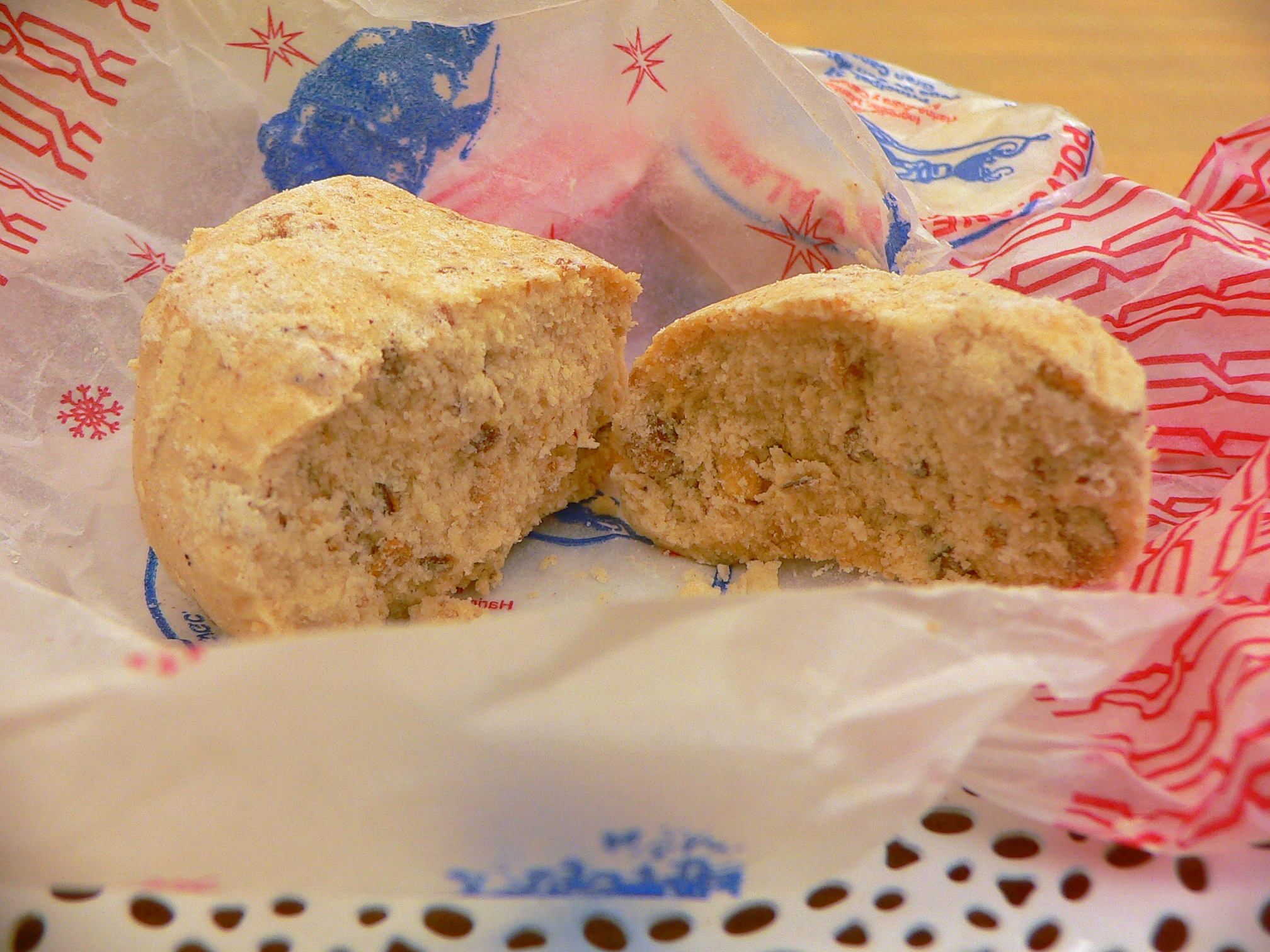
A polvorón, shown here, is a derivative of the mantecado.

Micaela Ruiz Tellez (1821–1904), also known as "La Colchona", was born in Estepa, near Seville, Spain in 1821. She was an enterprising woman who perfected a recipe for mantecados, a traditional Spanish crumble cake often eaten at Christmas.

== Commercial enterprise ==
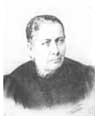
Micaela Ruiz Tellez

Micaela's husband often travelled from Estepa to Cordoba. She had the idea of trying to make mantecados that would last for the duration of his journey and succeeded in perfecting a recipe that allowed them to stay crisp on the outside but tender inside. In 1855, her husband started to sell these mantecado's in Cordoba and they proved to be so popular that Micaela Ruiz Téllez and her husband set up the first factory in Estepa to produce them.

Micaela Ruiz Tellez died at 83 years of age in 1904.
