= Arrowroot =

Food starch

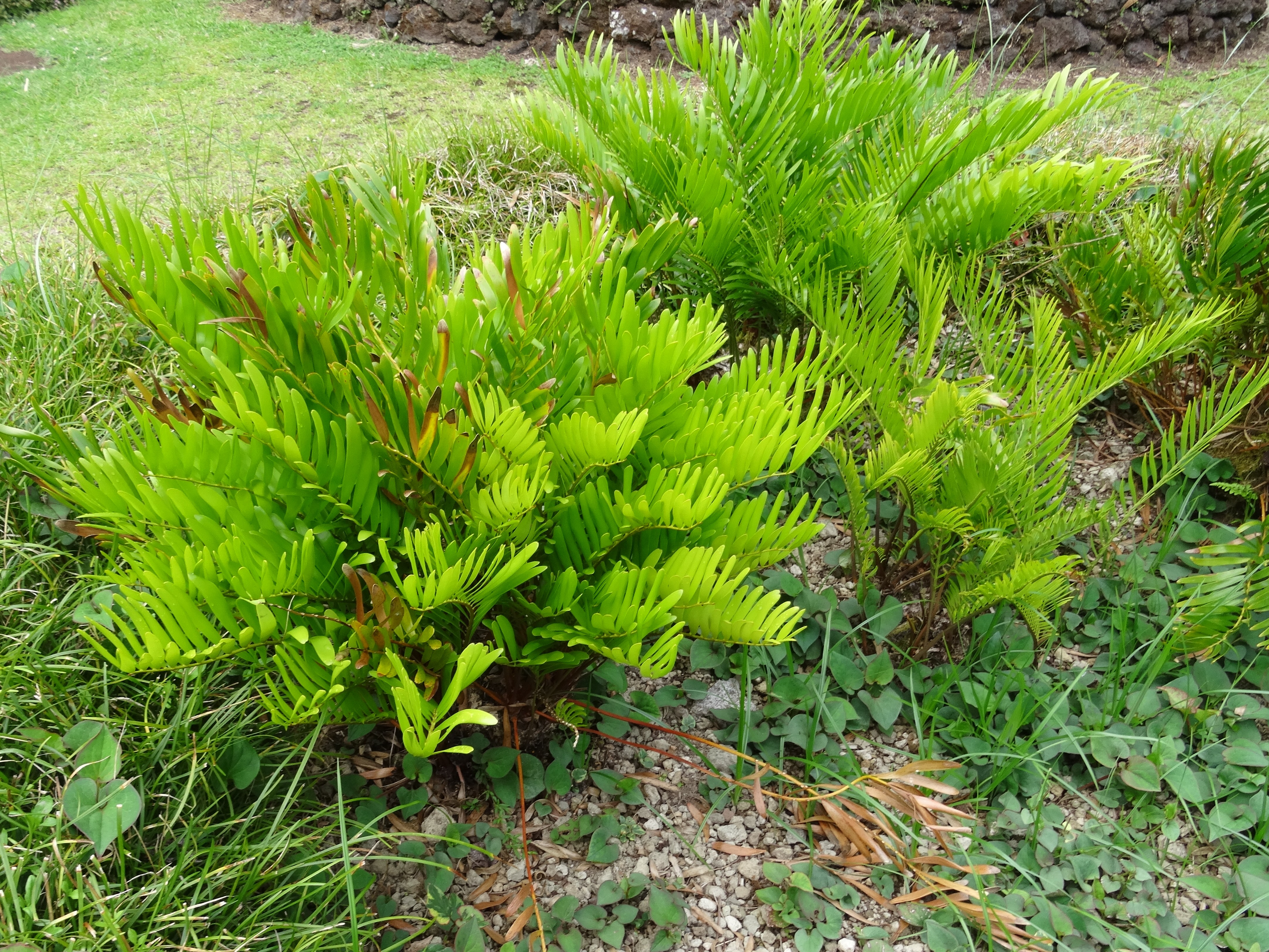
Zamia integrifolia

Arrowroot is a starch obtained from the rhizomes (rootstock) of several tropical plants, traditionally in particular Maranta arundinacea, but also Florida arrowroot (Zamia integrifolia), as well as tapioca from cassava (Manihot esculenta), which is often labeled arrowroot. In Kenya, "arrowroot" refers to nduma, a plant known elsewhere as taro. Polynesian arrowroot or pia (Tacca leontopetaloides), Guyana arrowroot (Dioscorea alata), Japanese arrowroot or kudzu (Pueraria lobata), and purple arrowroot (Canna indica) are used in similar ways.

M. arundinacea is called ପାଳୁଅ (paḷua) in Odisha, India, and uraró/araró in the Philippines, where it is the base starch of a popular cookie.

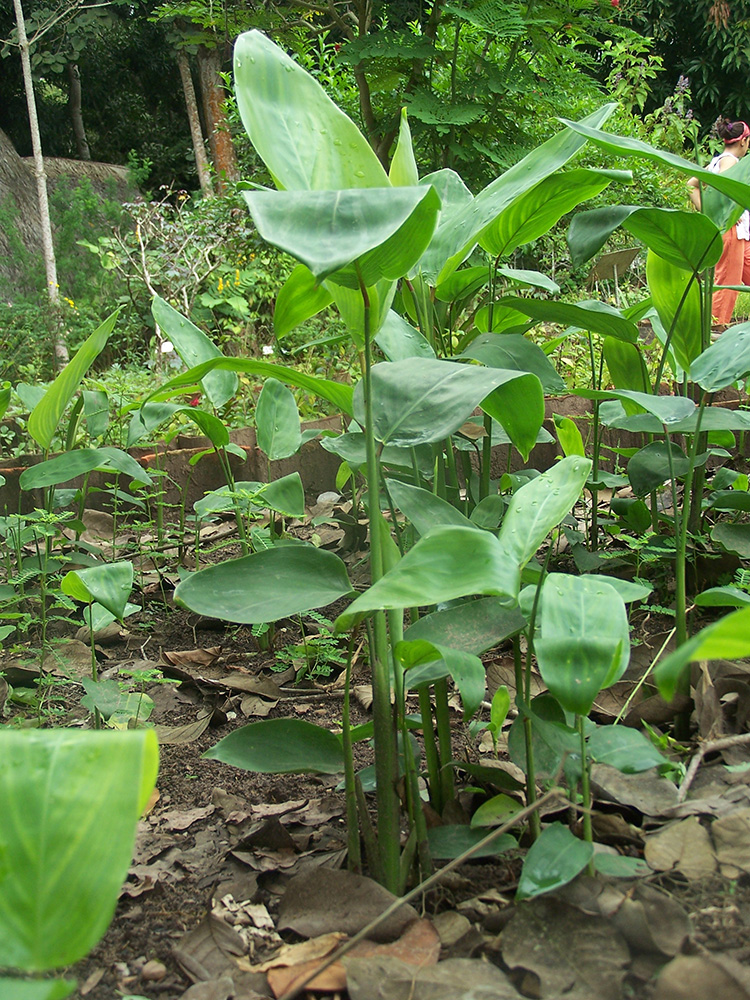
Maranta arundinacea

== History ==
Archaeological studies in the Americas show evidence of arrowroot cultivation as early as 7,000 years ago. The name may come from aru-aru (meal of meals) in the language of the Caribbean Arawak people, for whom the plant was a staple. It has also been suggested that the name comes from arrowroot's use in treating poison-arrow wounds, as it draws out the poison when applied to the site of the injury.

In the early days of carbonless copy paper, arrowroot starch, because of its appropriate grain-size, was a widely used ingredient. After an economical way of centrifugally separating wheat flour was devised, arrowroot lost its role in papermaking.

== Uses ==
=== Cultivation in Saint Vincent and the Grenadines ===
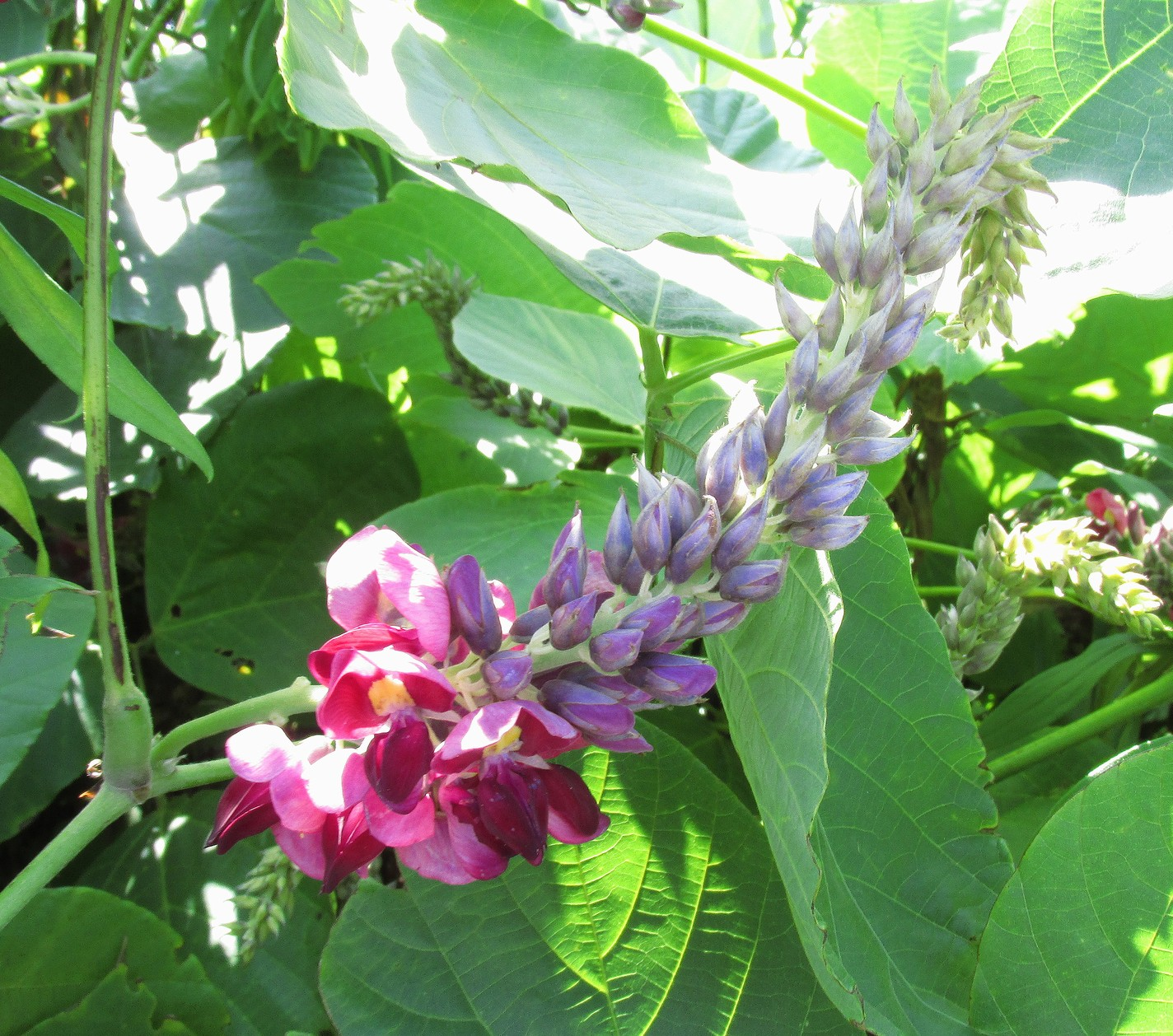
Pueraria lobata

Saint Vincent has a long history of arrowroot production. The industry started as the food and medicine of the Carib and Garifuna peoples and developed to the status of a major export of St. Vincent during the period 1900 to 1965. It became an important commodity in colonial trade in the 1930s. As the sugar industry declined in the nineteenth century, cultivation of arrowroot was developed to fill the void. Since then, the area cultivated has declined steadily as other crops, particularly bananas, have gained wider acceptance by farmers. Evidence of its former importance is indicated by the ruins of the various magnificent 19th-century factories located in valleys on the St. Vincent mainland.

Arrowroot cultivation is now concentrated on farms located north of the Rabacca River, particularly in the Owia area. This is also the area where the population of Carib descent is concentrated. In 1998/99, the industry produced 312,000 lb (142,000 kg) of starch, about 3% of the peak level in the 1960s.

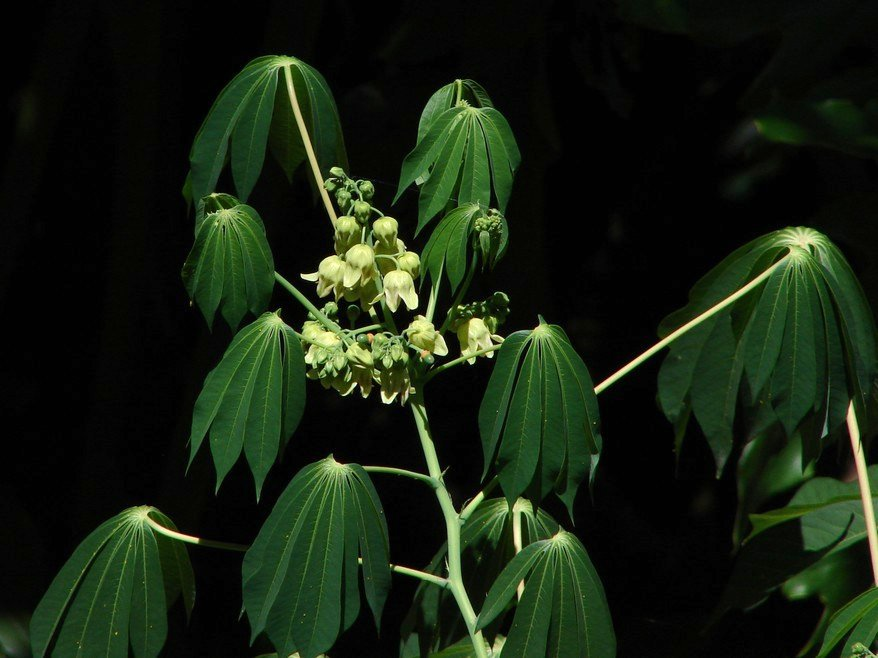
Manihot esculenta

In the past, the St. Vincent arrowroot industry played an important role in the economy of the island, contributing close to 50% of the country's foreign export earnings, and was the principal source of employment and income of the rural people from the 1930s to the 1960s.

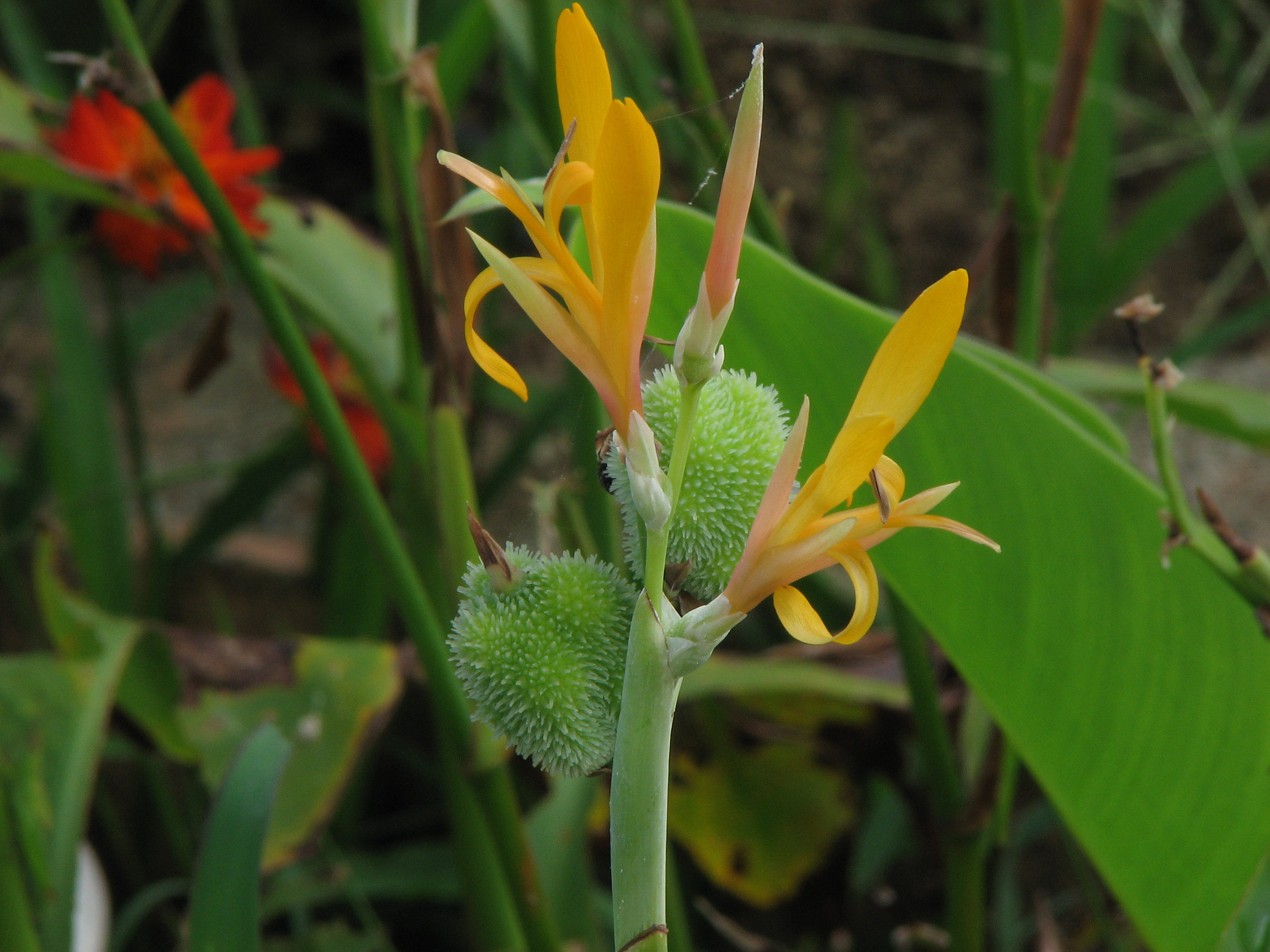
Canna indica

The plant is propagated from rhizomes and cultivation takes place at elevations up to 300 metres on the eastern and windward facing side of the highlands of St. Vincent. Cultivation covers an area of about 3,700 ha and some 80% of the crop is grown by small farmers. The arrowroot plant is very hardy and not very demanding in its requirements. St. Vincent, particularly the north-east coast, provides the ideal growing conditions for optimal yields: deep, well drained, slightly acidic soils and a hot, humid climate. Some farmers produce the crop by shifting cultivation on the cleared forested slopes.

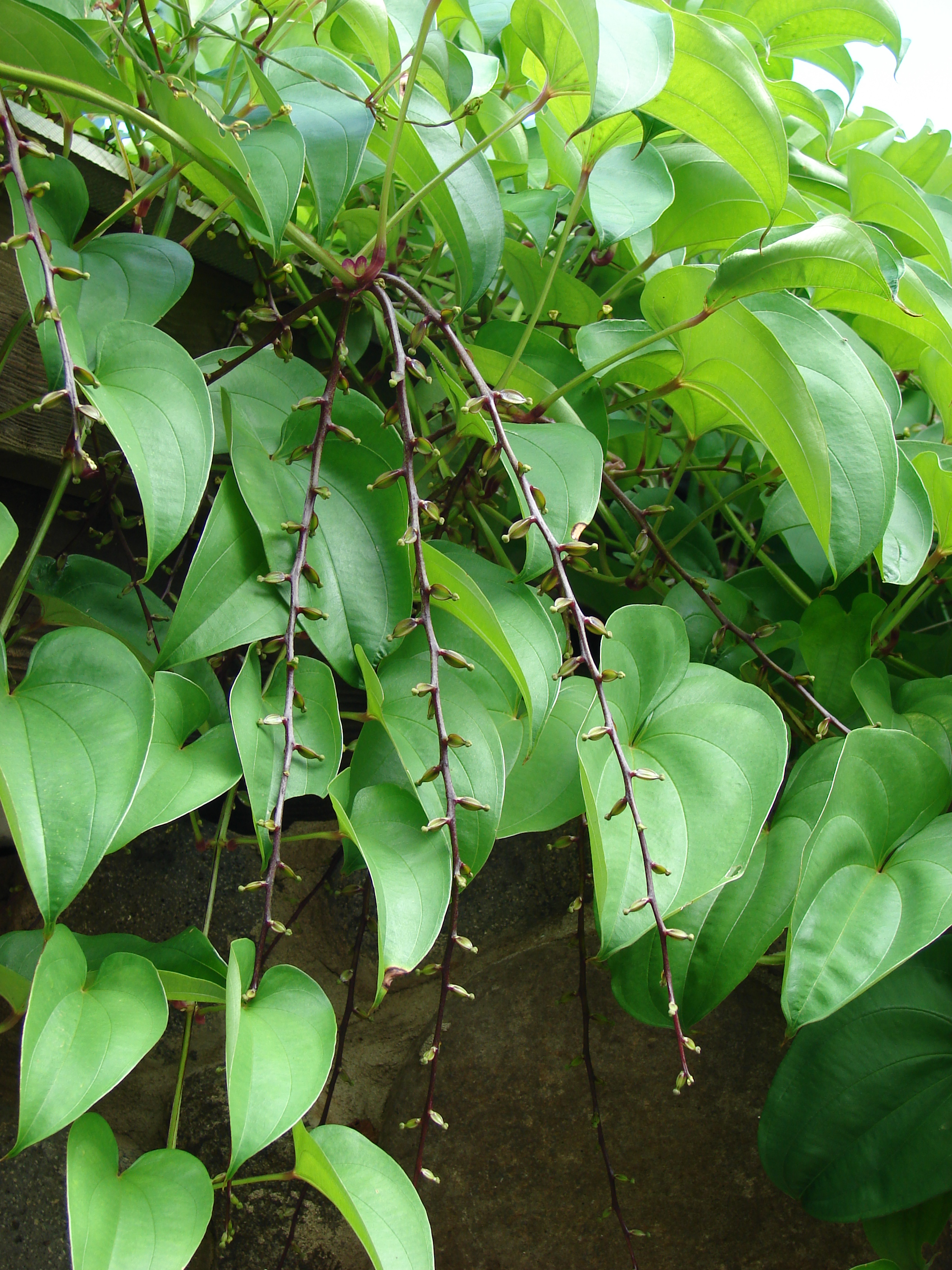
Dioscorea alata

The harvesting season extends from October to May. On the larger estates, the harvesting of the rhizome usually proceeds from the base of a hill towards the top. Harvesting involves breaking off the rhizome from the shoot. Planting and harvesting are inter-related in that when the rhizomes are harvested the shoot is replanted at the same time. In St. Vincent, much use is made of rural unemployment, and many women workers are involved in the various phases of operation. Mechanical harvesters have recently been introduced, allowing faster arrowroot harvesting.

Six factories process the island's arrowroot and large processing plants are located at Belle Vue and at Owia.

=== Starch extraction process ===
Arrowroot tubers contain about 23% starch. They are first washed and then cleaned of the paper-like scale. The scales must be carefully removed before extracting the starch because they impart a disagreeable flavour. After removing the scale, the roots are washed again, drained and finally reduced to a pulp by beating them in mortars or subjecting them to the action of a wheel rasp. The milky liquid thus obtained is passed through a coarse cloth or hair sieve and the pure starch, which is insoluble, is allowed to settle at the bottom. The wet starch is dried in the sun or in a drying house. The result is a powder, the "arrowroot" of commerce, that is quickly packed for market in air-tight cans, packages or cases.

Arrowroot starch has in the past been quite extensively adulterated with potato starch and other similar substances. Pure arrowroot, like other pure starches, is a light, white powder (the mass feeling firm to the finger and crackling like newly fallen snow when rubbed or pressed), odourless when dry, but emitting a faint, peculiar odour when mixed with boiling water, and swelling on cooking into a perfect jelly, which can be used to make a food that is very smooth in consistency—unlike adulterated articles, mixed with potato flour and other starches of lower value, which contain larger particles.

Microscopically the arrow root starch is oval in shape and with hilum at the proximal end.

=== Culinary ===
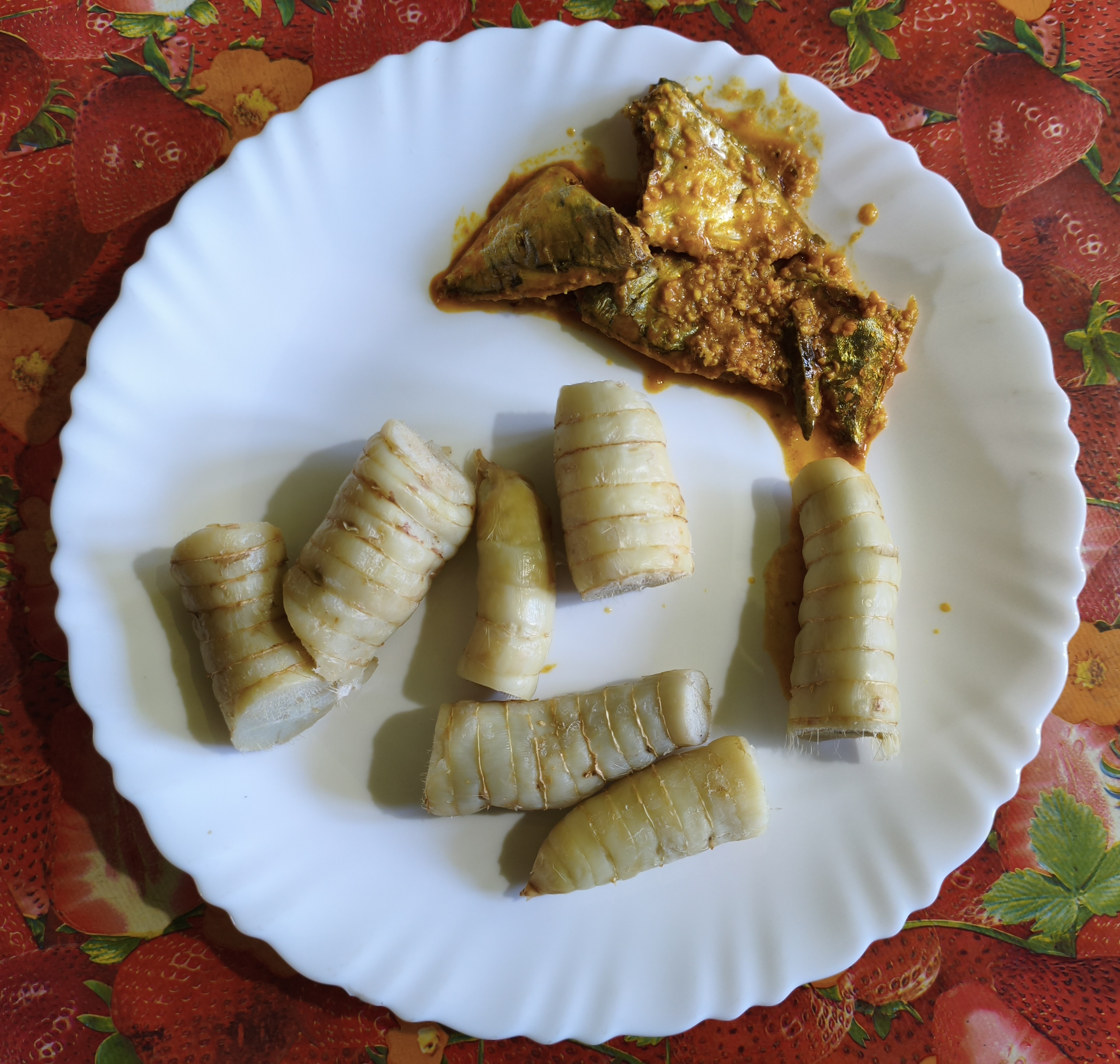
Boiled tubers of the arrowroot plant (Maranta arundinacea), a traditional method of preparation in South India.

Arrowroot can be consumed in the form of biscuits, such as Arnott's milk arrowroot biscuits. It may also be used as an ingredient in puddings, jellies, cakes, hot sauces, and also with beef tea, milk or veal broth. Kudzu arrowroot (Pueraria lobata) is used in noodles in Korean and Vietnamese cuisine. In the Victorian era it was used, boiled with a little flavouring added, as an easily digestible food for children and people with dietary restrictions.

Arrowroot makes clear, shimmering fruit gels and prevents ice crystals from forming in homemade ice cream. It can also be used as a thickener for acidic foods, such as East Asian sweet and sour sauce. It is used in cooking to produce a clear, thickened sauce, such as a fruit sauce. It will not make the sauce go cloudy, like cornstarch, flour, or other starchy thickening agents would do.

The lack of gluten in arrowroot flour makes it useful as a replacement for wheat flour for those with a gluten intolerance. It is, however, relatively high in carbohydrates and low in protein (approximately 7.7%) and does not provide a complete substitute for wheat flour in bread-making. In Filipino cuisine, Arrowroot flour is used to make uraro or arrowroot cookies.

Arrowroot thickens at a lower temperature than flour or cornstarch, is not weakened by acidic ingredients, has a more neutral taste, and is not affected by freezing. It does not mix well with dairy, forming a slimy mixture. It is recommended that arrowroot be mixed with a cool liquid before adding to a hot fluid. The mixture should be heated only until the mixture thickens and removed immediately to prevent the mixture from thinning. Overheating tends to break down arrowroot's thickening property. Two teaspoons of arrowroot can be substituted for one tablespoon of cornstarch, or one teaspoon of arrowroot for one tablespoon of wheat flour.

== See also ==
- Polynesian arrowroot
