= Estepa =

- Municipality
- Flag Coat of arms
- Motto: Latin: Ostippo, Quid Ultra? (Estepa, What else?)

- Location in Spain
- Coordinates: 37°17′30″N 4°52′45″W
- Country: Spain
- Autonomous community: Andalusia
- Province: Sevilla
- Comarca: Sierra Sur de Sevilla
- Founded: 1241

Government
  - Mayor: Juan García Baena (PSOE)

Area
  - Total: 202.42 km^{2} (78.15 sq mi)
- Elevation: 604 m (1,982 ft)

Population (2025-01-01)
  - Total: 12,430
  - Density: 61.41/km^{2} (159.0/sq mi)
- Demonym: Estepeño/a
- Time zone: UTC+1 (CET)
  - Summer (DST): UTC+2 (CEST)
- Postal code: 41560
- Website: Official website

Estepa is a municipality in the extreme south-east of the province of Seville. It had a population of 12.631 in 2013. The town is located north of the Sierra del Becerro mountains.

== History ==
Estepa possesses a very ancient past and has well-preserved remains to testify to this. Some date back to prehistory including flint tools and axes. The remains reveal the later accession of Carthaginian people. At least two settlements are known: one situated in Los Canterones, shown by ancient deposits some 6 km from the town of Estepa, and the other under present-day Estepa.

Estepa is mentioned in classical sources as Astapa and Ostippo. The Romans destroyed the Carthaginian city of Astapa during the Punic Wars, as described by Titus Livius. In the Roman epoch, the town bore the name Ostippo, a free city linked to the Conventus de Astigi (Écija). It was mentioned in the Antonine Itinerary. The Roman city would have occupied the high part of the site, but little evidence remains. Numerous remains of agricultural developments suggest many small populations in the plains to the north of Estepa.

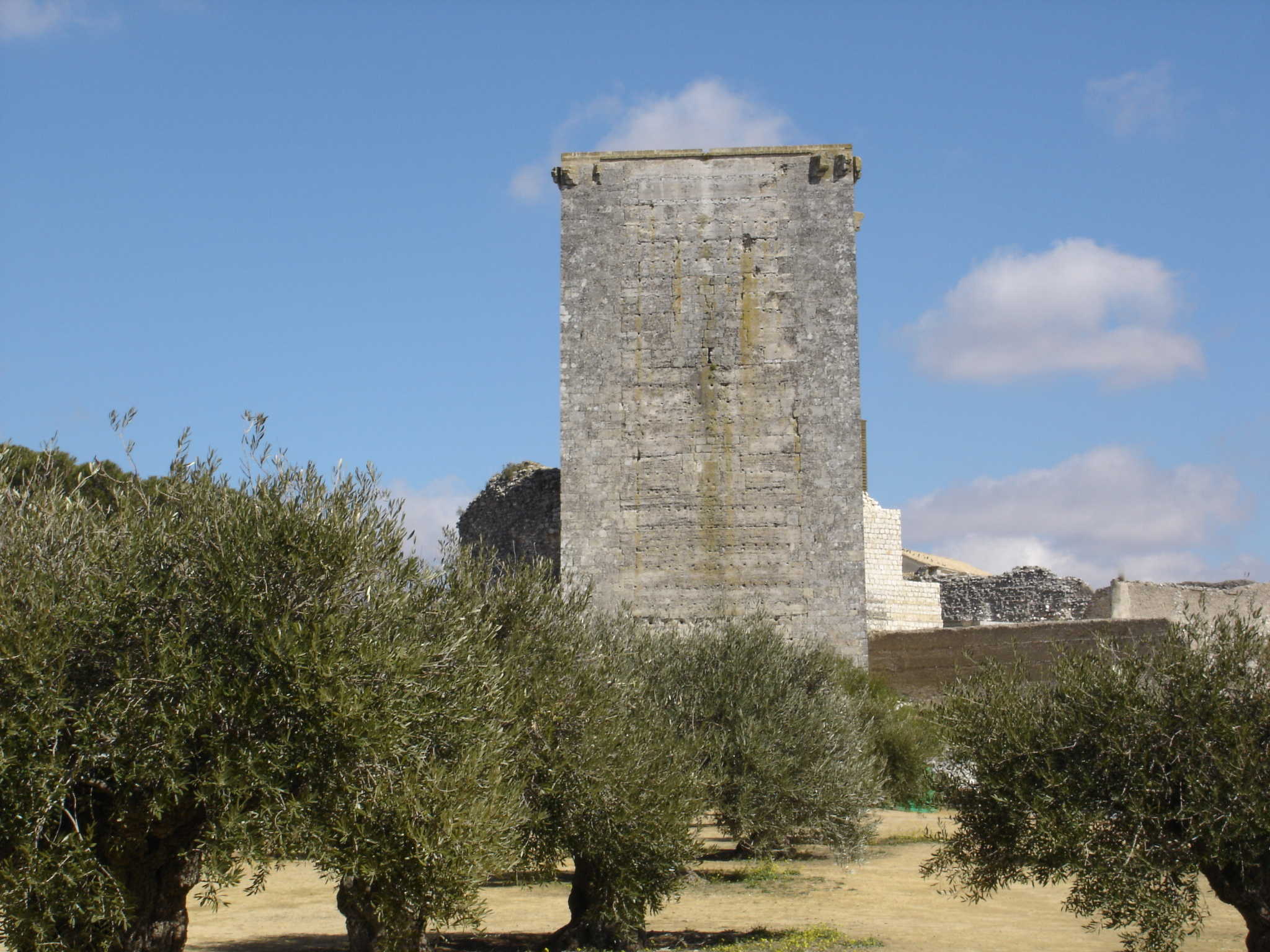
Torre del homenaje of the Alcázar of Estepa, on the hill of San Cristóbal.

The place continued to be inhabited during the Visigothic period. Under the Arabs it adopted the name Istabba, and the poet Al Zawwali lived there for a while. In 1267, having been taken by Fernando III during the Christian reconquest, the town was handed over to the Order of Santiago, to take charge of its defence as a frontier position. Its greatest monumental and artistic achievements were attained during the 16th and 17th centuries under the marquesses of Estepa; their palace was built on the site of the former Islamic fortress.

By the 19th century, although Estepa was expanding, the palace was in ruins and the area was known for banditry. The town was granted the title of "city" (ciudad) in 1886. During the Civil War it was soon taken over by Franco's forces. After the war, widespread poverty led to substantial emigration to industrial areas of Spain and other European countries during the 1950s and 1960s; the population remained at a constant level. Social conflict was still present in the area after the return to democracy in Spain, as seen in a strike of agricultural workers in 1990.

== Economy ==
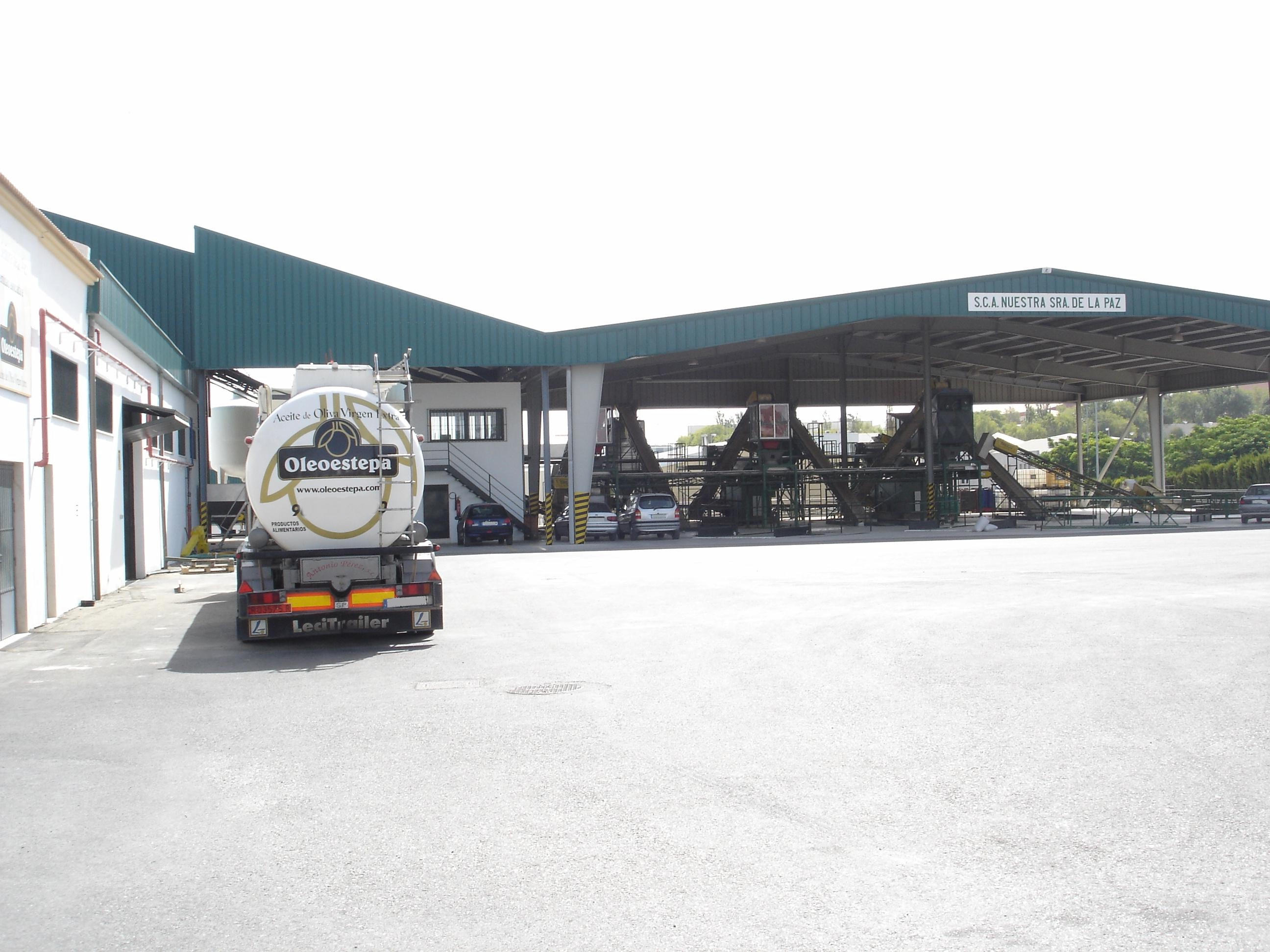
Olive oil cooperative

Estepa is well known for its production of Christmas-time sweets, mainly mantecado, or traditional Spanish crumble cake, notable for being based on pork fat. Since 2009 the production of these confections have been protected by a protected designation of origin, Mantecados de Estepa. Estepa has 30 such factories, 15 of which are partners in an export trade association, Coexema A.I.E. The factories produce about 18 million kilograms of Christmas sweets annually, and from September to December they employ in total about 2,000 employees. Over 90% of the workers at these factories are women.

Other industries are gaining prominence in the area as well, such as Graphic Arts, mechanical constructions, machinery, factories, transport, slaughterhouses, limestone production, etc. South of the mountain range is an industrial estate called "The Heart of Andalucia" with more than 140,000m^{2} of surface area divided into 96 plots. It is financed by Espa and Sodestepa LLC.

An important agricultural activity is olive growing: about 9,500 ha of land within the municipality is planted to olives and about 24 million kilograms of a protected designation of origin olive oil are produced annually.

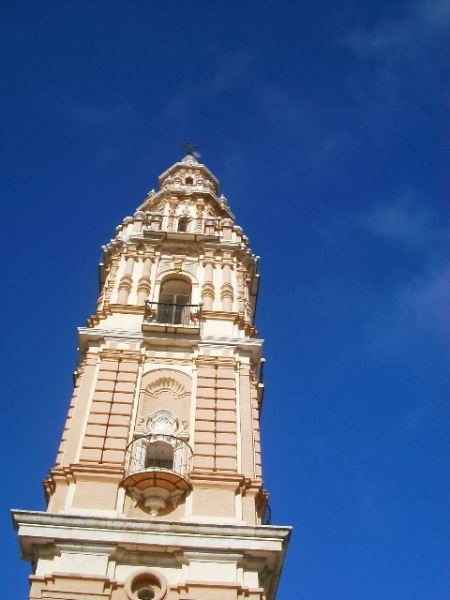
Torre de la Victoria

Tourism is also a major part of Estepa's economy. Tourists can visit many monuments and historical places, such as Convento de Santa Clara, Convento de San Francisco, a ruined fortress (Antiguo Alcázar), the Torre de la Victoria church tower, the Balcón de Andalucia viewpoint, and many churches.

== Twin towns ==
Estepa is twinned with:

- Badia Polesine, Italy
- Bédarieux, France
- Corrientes, Argentina
- Piera, Spain

== See also ==
- List of cities in Spain
- Micaela Ruiz Téllez
- List of municipalities in Seville
