= Zamia lucayana =

Conservation status
- Critically Endangered (IUCN 3.1)

Scientific classification
- Kingdom: Plantae
- Clade: Embryophytes
- Clade: Tracheophytes
- Clade: Gymnosperms
- Division: Cycadophyta
- Class: Cycadopsida
- Order: Cycadales
- Family: Zamiaceae
- Genus: Zamia
- Species: Z. lucayana

Binomial name
- Zamia lucayana Britton

Species of cycad

Zamia lucayana is a species of plant in the family Zamiaceae, part of the Zamia pumila species complex. It is endemic to the Bahamas, and is endangered by habitat loss. Z. lucayana is known locally as "bay rush".

== Characteristics ==
All of the known populations of Z. lucayana are in a 6.5 kilometres (4.0 mi) by 100 metres (330 ft) strip of coastal scrub dominated by Coccoloba uvifera (sea grape) on the east coast of Long Island. In the early 2010s Z. lucayana was found in three major populations (240 to 400 adult plants each) at the settlements of Buckley's, Petty's, and Hamilton's, and two minor populations of 10 adult plants at Galloway Landing and 20 adult plants at Mangrove Bush, for a total of about 980 adult plants. The coastal scrub habitat is 1 square kilometre (0.39 sq mi) in area, with the Z. lucayana plants covering just 0.06 square kilometres (6.0 ha; 15 acres) of the habitat.

Z. lucayana has sometimes been listed as a synonym of Zamia integrifolia, As of 2013 it is regarded as a valid species.

== Sources ==
- Calonje, Michael; Stevenson, Dennis Wm.; Osborne, Roy (2013). "The World List of Cycads" (PDF). Cycads. 5 (1): 77–119. Archived from the original (PDF) on 2024-06-20.
- Calonje, Michael; Meerow, Alan W.; Knowles, Lindy; Knowles, David; Griffith, M. Patrick; Nakamura, Kyoko; Francisco-Ortega, Javier (April 2013). "Cycad biodiversity in the Bahamas Archipelago and conservation genetics of the threatened Zamia lucayana (Zamiaceae)". Oryx. 47 (2): 190–198. doi:10.1017/S0030605312000129.
- Haynes, Jody L. (2008). World List of Cycads: A Historical Review (PDF) (Report). IUCN/SSC Cycad Specialist Group.
- Salas-Leiva, Dayana E.; Meerow, Alan W.; Calonje, Michael; Francisco-Ortega, Javier; Griffith, M. Patrick; Nakamura, Kyoko; Sánchez, Vanessa; Knowles, Lindy; Knowles, David (May 2017). "Shifting Quaternary migration patterns in the Bahamian archipelago: Evidence from the Zamia pumila complex at the northern limits of the Caribbean island biodiversity hotspot". American Journal of Botany. 104 (5): 757–771. doi:10.3732/ajb.1700054. ISSN 0002-9122. PMID 28515078.
