= Masa podrida =

Shortbread cookies

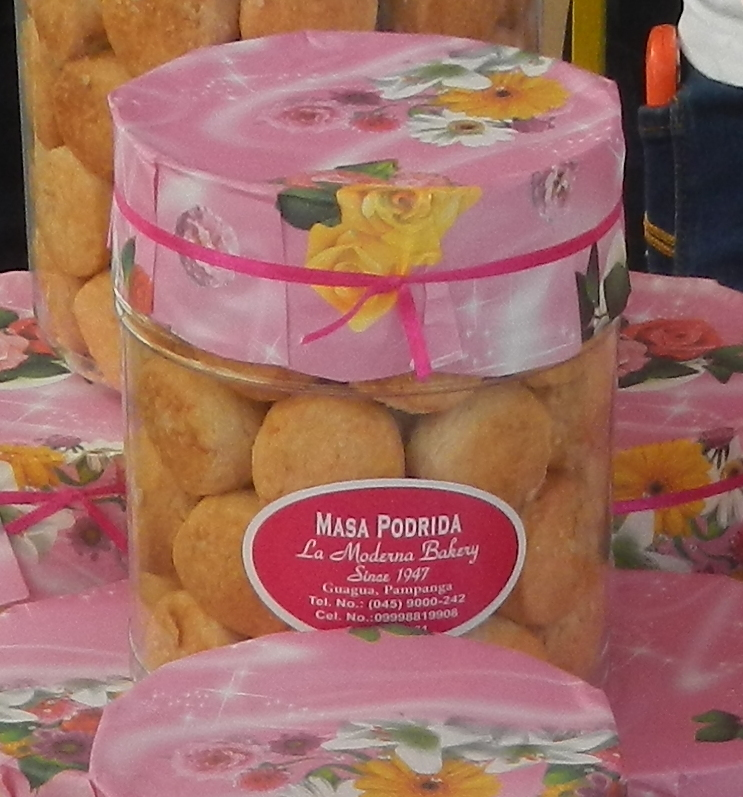
- Masa podrida cookies from Pampanga
- Type: Cookie
- Place of origin: Philippines

Masa podrida are traditional Filipino shortbread cookies made from flour, salt, baking powder, brown sugar, shortening, and eggs. It has a dry crumbly texture similar to half-moon cookies. The name comes from Spanish for "rotten dough". Masa podrida are typically eaten with coffee and other hot drinks.

== See also ==
- Puto seco
- Uraro
- Half-moon cookie
- List of cookies
