= Florida arrowroot =

Edible starch

Florida arrowroot was the commercial name of an edible starch extracted from Zamia integrifolia (coontie), a small cycad native to North America.

== Use ==
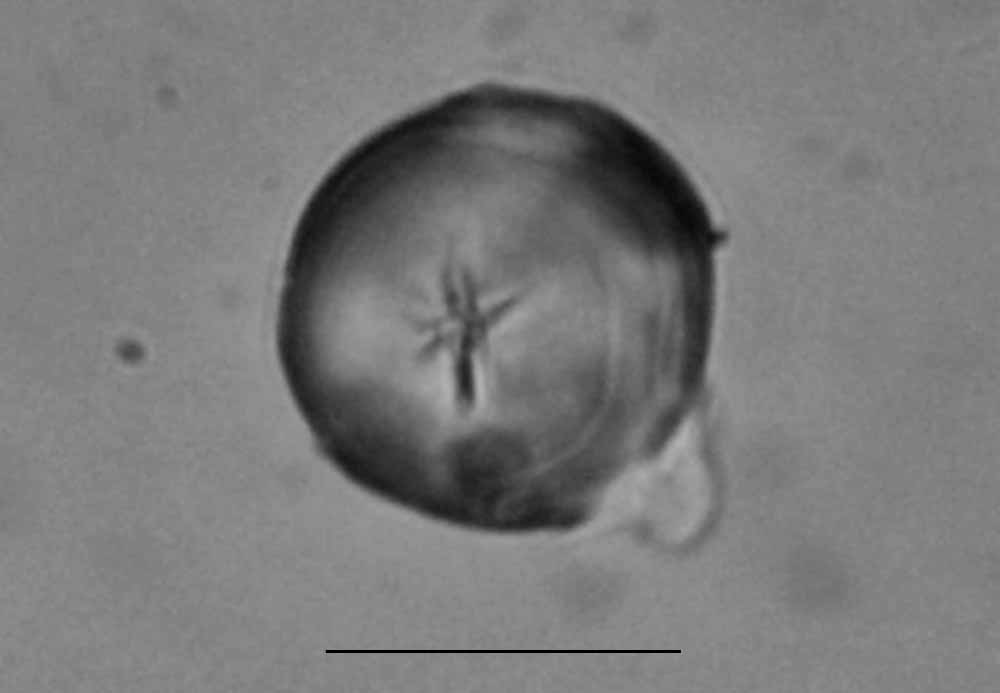
TEM of a Zamia starch grain found at an archaeological site in Puerto Rico

Like other cycads, Zamia integrifolia is poisonous, producing a toxin that affects the gastrointestinal tract and nervous system. The toxin can however be removed by careful leaching, and the roots and half-buried stems of this cycad were used by Native American people (notably the Tequesta and Mayaimi Indians, the Seminole Indians and the Maroons) to produce this starch. The root is typically prepared by grinding (macerating) it using a wooden mortar and pestle. The pulp is then saturated in water and drained. The drained fluid is allowed to dry and the resulting yellowish powder is used in the preparation of various foods. In commercial production, multiple macerations achieved a whiter color.

Commercial production of the starch (using roots gathered from wild plants) occurred in South Florida, from the 1830s until the 1920s. The starch was sold as Florida arrowroot until the Food and Drug Administration banned the practice in 1925. The last commercial "coontie starch" factory in Florida was destroyed by the 1926 Miami Hurricane.

== Etymology ==
The reference to arrowroot, a well known and high quality starch, was a marketing ploy. Because of this use, Zamia integrifolia is sometimes known as Florida arrowroot.
