= Puto seco =

Rice flour cookies

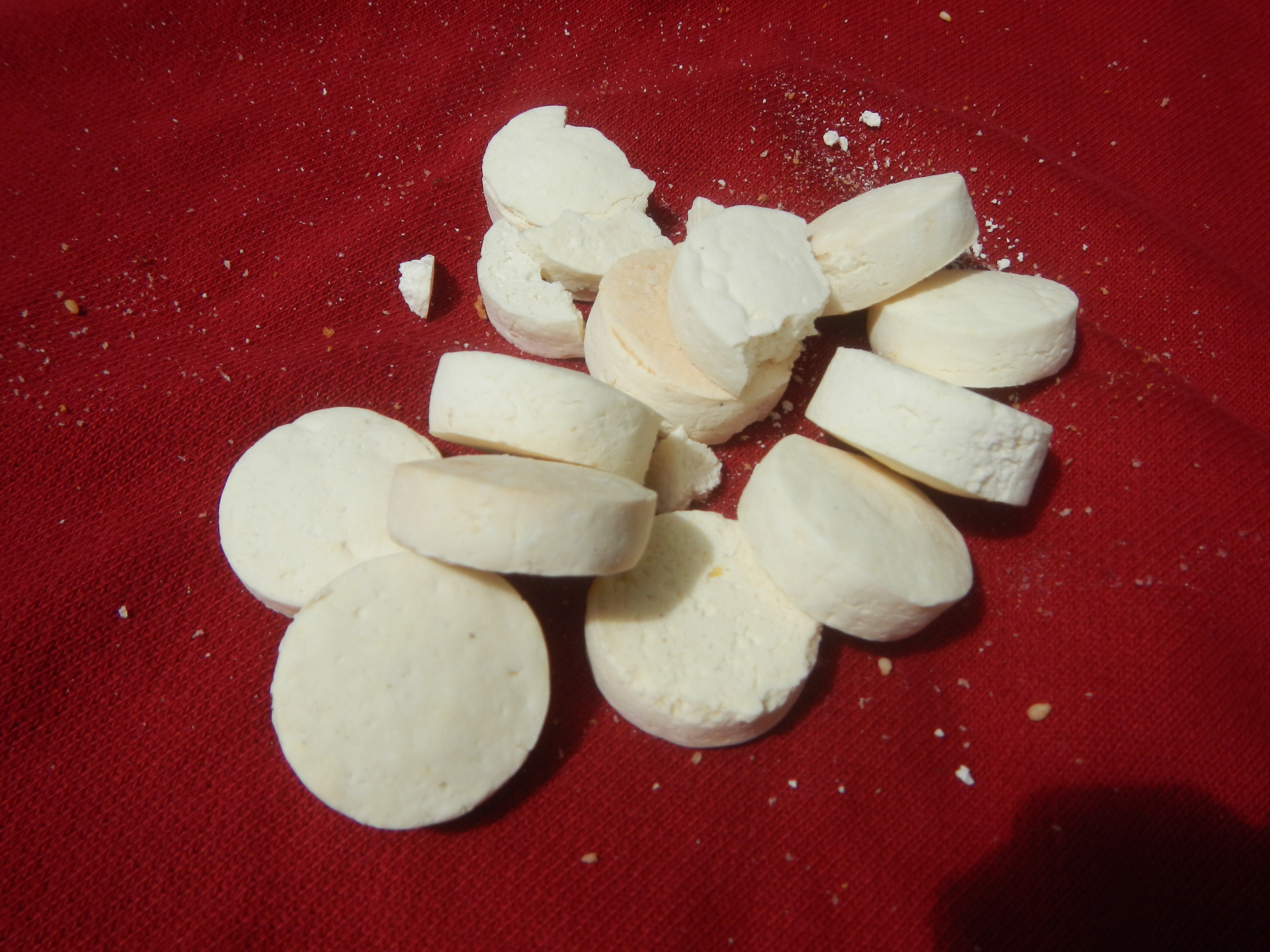
- Alternative names: puto masa, puto seko, dry puto, coconut angel cookie
- Type: Cookie
- Place of origin: Philippines

Puto seco, also known as puto masa, are Filipino cookies made from ground glutinous rice, cornstarch, sugar, salt, butter, and eggs. They are characteristically white and often shaped into thick disks. They have a dry, powdery texture.

== Etymology ==
The name is derived from Filipino puto (traditional Filipino steamed rice cakes) and Spanish seco ("dry"), in reference to its texture. It is also spelled as "puto seko".

== Description ==
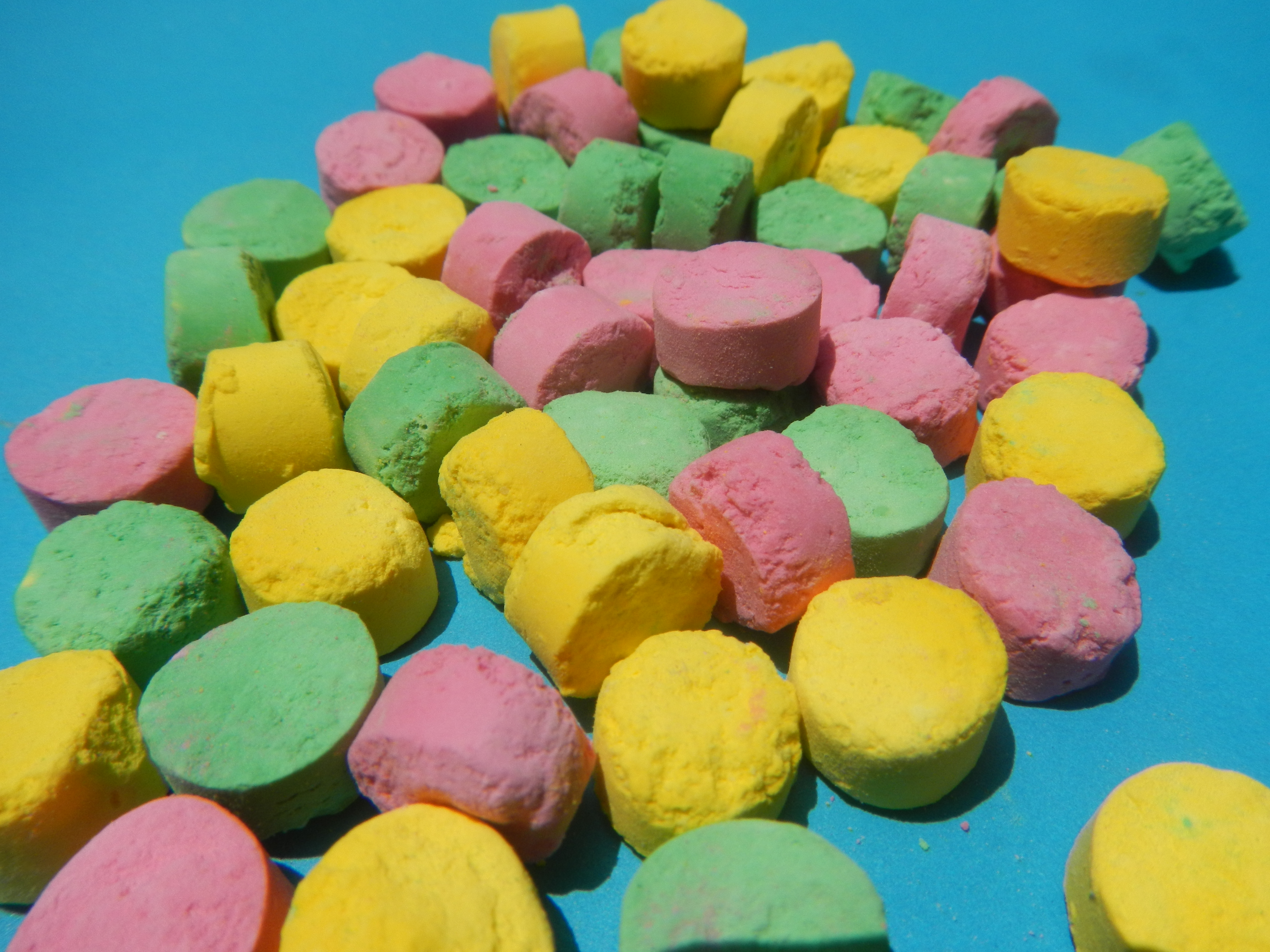
Multicolored puto masa

Traditional puto seco is made from galapong, ground glutinous rice grains soaked in water overnight. However, modern versions are more commonly produced with rice flour or all-purpose flour. It is mixed with cornstarch, butter, eggs, salt, and sugar. Milk can also be added. It is baked until dry and brittle. Some modern versions of puto seco come in other flavors like ube (purple yam), coconut, and buko pandan.

Multicolored candy-like versions of puto seco are sometimes known as puto masa (lit. "corn dough puto"). This variant is common in the provinces of Laguna and Batangas.

== Similar dishes ==
Puto seco is very similar to other traditionally powdery cookies in the Philippines like masa podrida and uraró.

== See also ==
- Uraro
- Polvoron
- Mamon tostado
- Kue bangkit
- List of cookies
