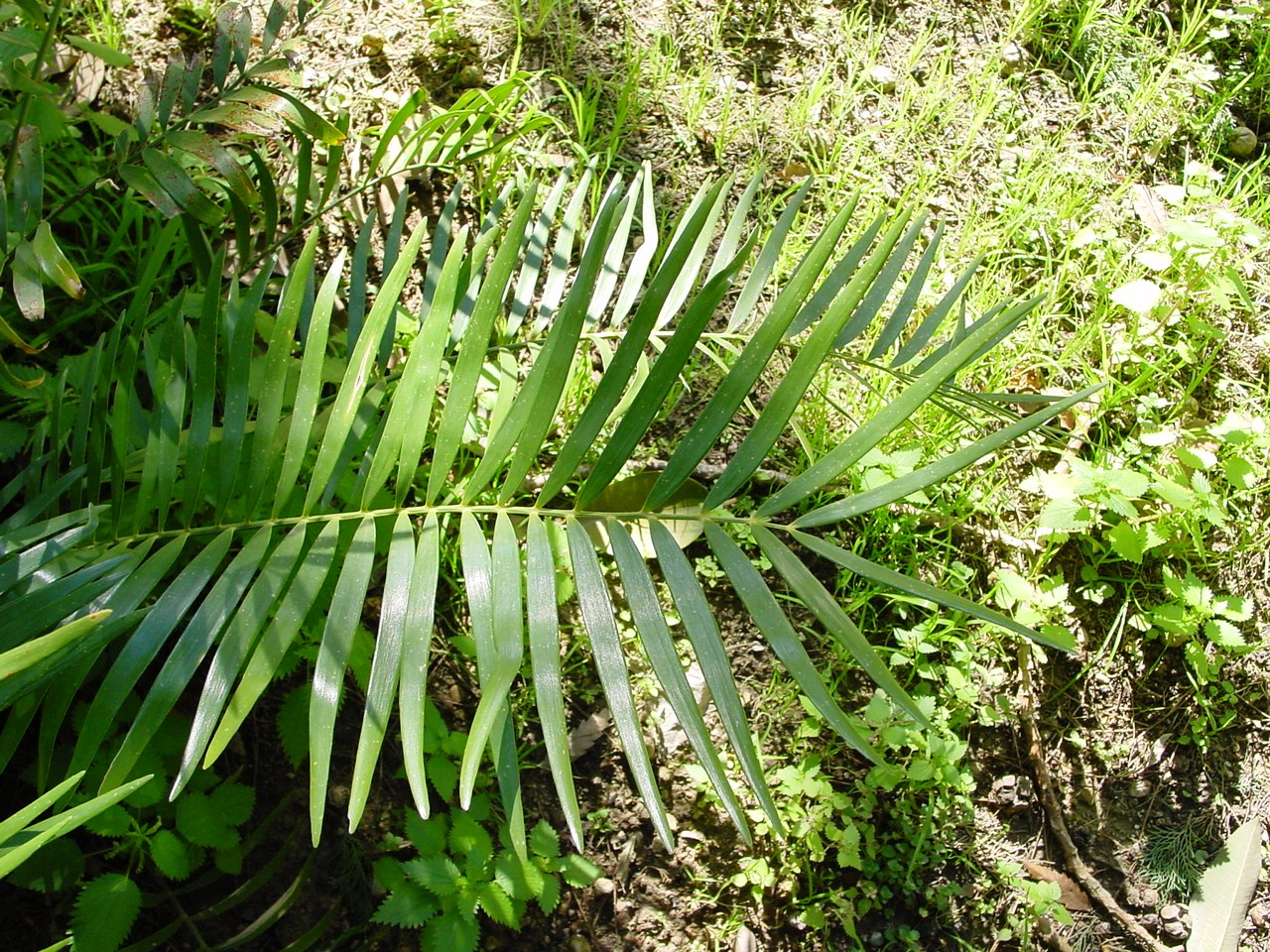
- Leaves of Zamia integrifolia

Conservation status
- Near Threatened (IUCN 3.1)

- Vulnerable (NatureServe)

Scientific classification
- Kingdom: Plantae
- Clade: Tracheophytes
- Clade: Gymnosperms
- Division: Cycadophyta
- Class: Cycadopsida
- Order: Cycadales
- Family: Zamiaceae
- Genus: Zamia
- Species: Z. integrifolia

Binomial name
- Zamia integrifolia L.f.
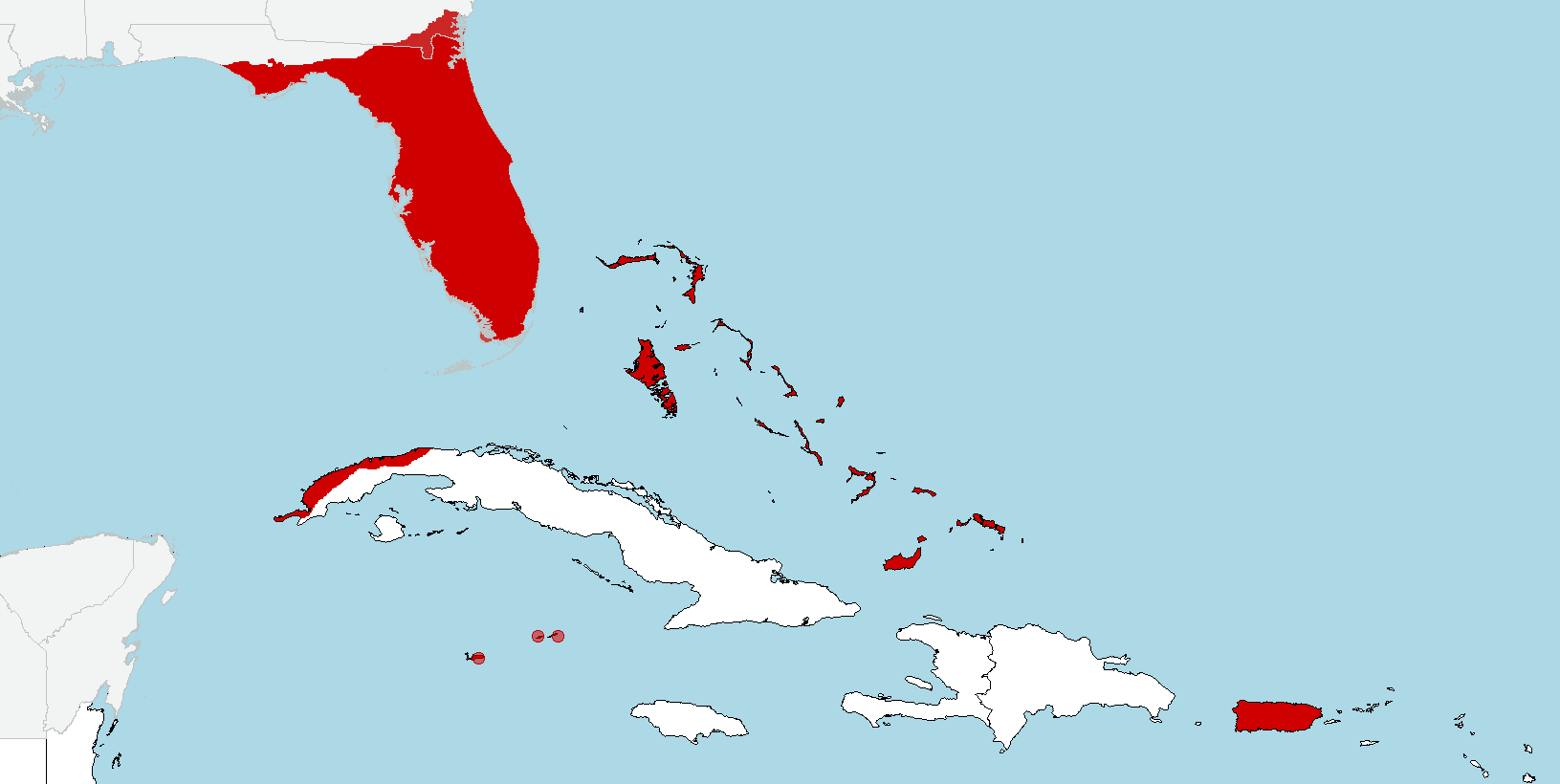
- Distribution map

Synonyms
- List: Palmifolium floridanum (A.DC.) Kuntze; Palmifolium integrifolium (L.f.) Kuntze; Palmifolium medium (Jacq.) Kuntze; Palmifolium tenue (Willd.) Kuntze; Zamia angustifolia var. floridana (A.DC.) Regel; Zamia dentata Voigt; Zamia erosa Cook & Collins; Zamia floridana A. DC.; Zamia floridana f. floridana; Zamia floridana f. silvicola (Small) J.Schust.; Zamia floridana var. floridana; Zamia floridana var. purshiana J.Schust.; Zamia floridana var. purshiana f. silvicola (Small) J.Schust.; Zamia floridana var. umbrosa (Small) D.B.Ward; Zamia integrifolia var. broomei D.B.Ward; Zamia integrifolia var. floridana (A.DC.) D.B.Ward; Zamia integrifolia var. silvicola (Small) D.B.Ward; Zamia integrifolia var. umbrosa (Small) D.B.Ward; Zamia media Jacq.; Zamia media f. brevipinnata J.Schust.; Zamia media f. calciola J.Schust.; Zamia media var. commeliniana J.Schust.; Zamia media var. jacquiniana J.Schust.; Zamia media var. tenuis (Willd) J.Schust.; Zamia silvicola Small; Zamia subcoriacea H.L.Wendl. ex J.Schust.; Zamia tenuis Willd.; Zamia umbrosa Small

= Zamia integrifolia =

Species of cycad

Zamia integrifolia, also known as coontie, is a small, tough, woody cycad native to the southeastern United States (in Florida and formerly in Georgia), the Bahamas, Cuba, the Cayman Islands, and Puerto Rico. It is the only cycad native to the continental United States (the parts of the USA that exclude Hawaii and Alaska). Traditionally, it was used by Indigenous Americans to make starch.

== Description ==
Z. integrifolia is a low-growing plant, with a trunk that grows to 3–25 cm high, but is often subterranean. Over time, it forms a multi-branched cluster, with a large, tuberous root system, which is actually an extension of the above-ground stems. The leaves can be completely lost during cold periods, with the plant lying dormant in its tuberous root system, allowing this cycad to be relatively cold hardy. The plant can survive up to USDA region 8b (10° to 20°F). The stems and leaves regenerate after the cold period subsides with full foliage.

Like other cycads, Z. integrifolia is dioecious, having male or female plants. The male cones are cylindrical, growing to 5–16 cm long; they are often clustered. The female cones are elongate-ovoid and grow to 5–19 cm long and 4–6 cm in diameter.

It produces reddish seed cones with a distinct acuminate tip. The leaves are 20–100 cm long, with 5-30 pairs of leaflets (pinnae). Each leaflet is linear to lanceolate or oblong-obovate, 8–25 cm long and 0.5–2 cm broad, entire or with indistinct teeth at the tip. They are often revolute, with prickly petioles. It is similar in many respects to the closely related Z. pumila, but that species differs in the more obvious toothing on the leaflets.

== Edibility and toxicity ==
=== Edibility ===
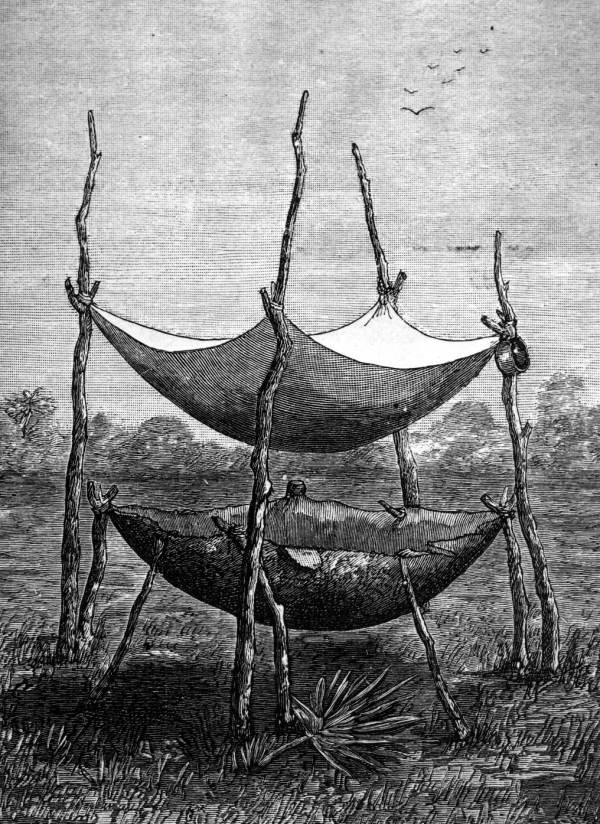
A strainer used by Seminole people to extract an edible starch from coontie root.

Indigenous tribes of Florida like the Seminole and Tequesta ground the root and soaked it overnight; afterwards, they rinsed it with running water for several hours to remove the rest of the water-soluble toxin cycasin. The resulting paste was then left to ferment before being dried into a powder. The resulting powder could then be used to make a bread-like substance. By the late 1880s, several mills in the Miami area started to produce Florida arrowroot until their demise after World War I.

Seeds generally fall close to the parent plant, although about five percent of seeds are found more than four meters away. Some authors believe that birds and small mammals are responsible for that dispersal. While such behavior has not been observed, marks on seeds, and the location of seeds under shrubs where birds perch and small mammals shelter indicate that the seeds have been carried there. The size of the seeds probably restricts how far birds can carry seeds.

=== Toxicity ===
The whole plant, except for the sarcotesta, the pulpy covering of the seeds, is very toxic, containing a toxin called cycasin which can cause liver failure that can lead to death, but if proper precautions are taken it can be leached with water due to it being a water-soluble molecule. The seeds also contain a toxic glycoside which causes headaches, vomiting, stomach pains and diarrhoea if ingested, and Beta-methylamino-alanine, which can cause central nervous system failure.

== Common names ==
This plant has several common names. Two names, Florida arrowroot and wild sago, refer to the former commercial use of this species as the source of an edible starch. Coontie (or koonti) is derived from the Seminole Native American language conti hateka. George J. F. Clarke, the surveyor general of East Florida during the Second Spanish period, wrote an article in 1823 for the St. Augustine newspaper at the time, the East Florida Herald, which discussed, among other subjects, how the bulbous roots of coontie, which he called "comtee", could be used to make flour, thus anticipating the future commercial enterprise in Florida.

== Distribution and habitat ==
Z. integrifolia inhabits a variety of habitats with well-drained sands or sandy loam soils. It prefers filtered sunlight to partial shade. In the United States populations are presently limited to Florida. A Zamia species has been twice reported from extreme southeastern Georgia, in 1928 (a single plant of uncertain provenance) and 1971 (a single population of three plants on St. Simons Island in Glynn County), when it was identified as Z. umbrosa, since synonymized to Z. integrifolia. There have been no reports of Z. integrifolia in Georgia since 1971 and a search of Glynn County in 2016 did not find any specimens of the species. Z. integrifolia is presumed to be extinct in Georgia.

In the Bahamas, Z. integrifolia is found in Bahamian pine forests and Bahamian dry forests on the Abaco Islands, where it is abundant, northern Andros, where it is common, Grand Bahama, where it is rare, and New Providence, where it is found in the few remaining unfragmented patches of pine forest. Z. integrifolia is also found in coastal thickets on Eleuthera and in sandy coastal scrub on Tilloo Cay. In the late 19th century, Zamia plants in the Bahamas were known as "bay rush", and were harvested on Andros and New Providence islands to produce starch. Z. integrifolia has also been reported from the north-central coast of Cuba, the Cayman Islands, and south-central Puerto Rico.

Molecular phylogenetic studies by Calonje, et al. published in 2019, and Lindstrom, et al. in 2024, found that Z. integrifolia from Florida is a sister taxon to the rest of the Caribbean island Zamia species, while plants identified as Z. integrifolia from Cuba and the Bahamas are variously closely related to Z. angustifolia and Z. lucayana.

== Taxonomy ==
The type specimen of Z. integrifolia was a cultivated plant from East Florida, described by William Aiton at the Royal Botanic Gardens, Kew. Andrew Turnbull, who founded the colony of New Smyrna in East Florida, sent a specimen of Zamia to Alexander Garden in Charleston, South Carolina, who in turn sent it to Aiton, and it thus may be the specimen described by Aiton.

Controversy has long existed over the classification of Zamia in Florida. Prior to the 1980s, several species were recognized in Florida, including Z. integrifolia Z. angustifolia var. floridana, Z. floridana, Z. silvicola, and Z. umbrosa. In 1983 Eckenwalder included all the Zamia populations in the Bahamas, the Caribbean, and Florida in a broadly defined Z. pumila, but Z. integrifolia is now accepted as one of nine species in the Zamia pumila species complex.

The differences between populations cannot be explained by habitat variability. Studies conducted by Ward showed that five different Florida populations of Z. integrifolia with identical cultivation produced distinct leaf morphology, suggesting that there may be too much genetic diversity amongst these Floridian Z. integrifolia, not to mention geographically isolated populations, to consider them a single species. Ward describes five varieties of Z. integrifolia in Florida:

- Z. integrifolia var. integrifolia - The variety first described as Z. integrifolia is common in central and southern Florida. Plants currently growing wild in the vicinity of New Smyrna Beach, the possible type site, have parallel-margined leaflets 13 to 14 cm long and about 13 mm wide. Populations of variety integrifolia generally have leaflet widths of 8 to 16 mm.
- Z. integrifolia var. umbrosa - Earlier designated as Z. umbrosa, this variety is found in the upper eastern Florida peninsula. It has leaflets 3 to 7 mm wide, with slightly protruding vein tips or "teeth" near the apex of the leaflets. Ward argues that umbrosa is the variety most strongly differentiated from the common integrifolia variety.
- Z. integrifolia var. broomei - A variety found in the lower Suwannee River valley, with leaflets 5 to 7 mm wide, and sparse foliage.
- Z. integrifolia var. floridana - A variety found on shell mounds on the west coast of the Florida peninsula. The female cones are up to 18 cm tall, and 8 cm in diameter, about twice as large as those on plants on the east coast of the Florida peninsula.
- Z. integrifolia var. silvicola - Found in the vicinity of Crystal River and in the Everglades, this variety has leaflets 12 to 17 cm long and 10 to 15 mm wide.

Griffith et al. performed an analysis of the genetics of samples of Z. integrifolia from throughout its known range in Florida that supports the presence of only two varieties of Z. integrifolia in Florida, Ward's Z. integrifolia var. umbrosa, and everything else, subsumed into Z. integrifolia var. integrifolia. That study found much less genetic variation in Z. integrifolia than in other Zamia species across the Caribbean. Most of the local populations in Florida exhibit a recent population bottleneck. The authors attribute that to the overexploitation of Z. integrifolia for the production of starch in the 19th and early 20th centuries.

Z. lucayana, which has sometimes been listed as a synonym of Z. integrifolia, is regarded as a valid species, restricted to Long Island in the Bahamas. While the floridana variety of Z. angustifolia has been synonymized to Z. integrifolia, the species Z. angustifolia, found in the Bahamas and Cuba, remains a valid species.

Two studies on the molecular phylogenetics of Zamia have found that Z. integrifolia in Florida is sister to a clade consisting of all of the zamias of the Bahamas and Caribbean islands. A 2019 study based on DNA found that Z. integrifolia from the Bahamas was more closely related to Z. angustifolia and Z. pygmaea than to Z. integrifolia from Florida, and that Z. integrifolia from Cuba was more closely related to Z. lucayana than to Z. integrifolia in Florida. A 2024 study based on transcriptomes found that Z. intregrifolia from the Bahamas was more closely related to Z.angustifolia and Z. lucayana than to Z. integrifolia in Florida.

== Ecology ==
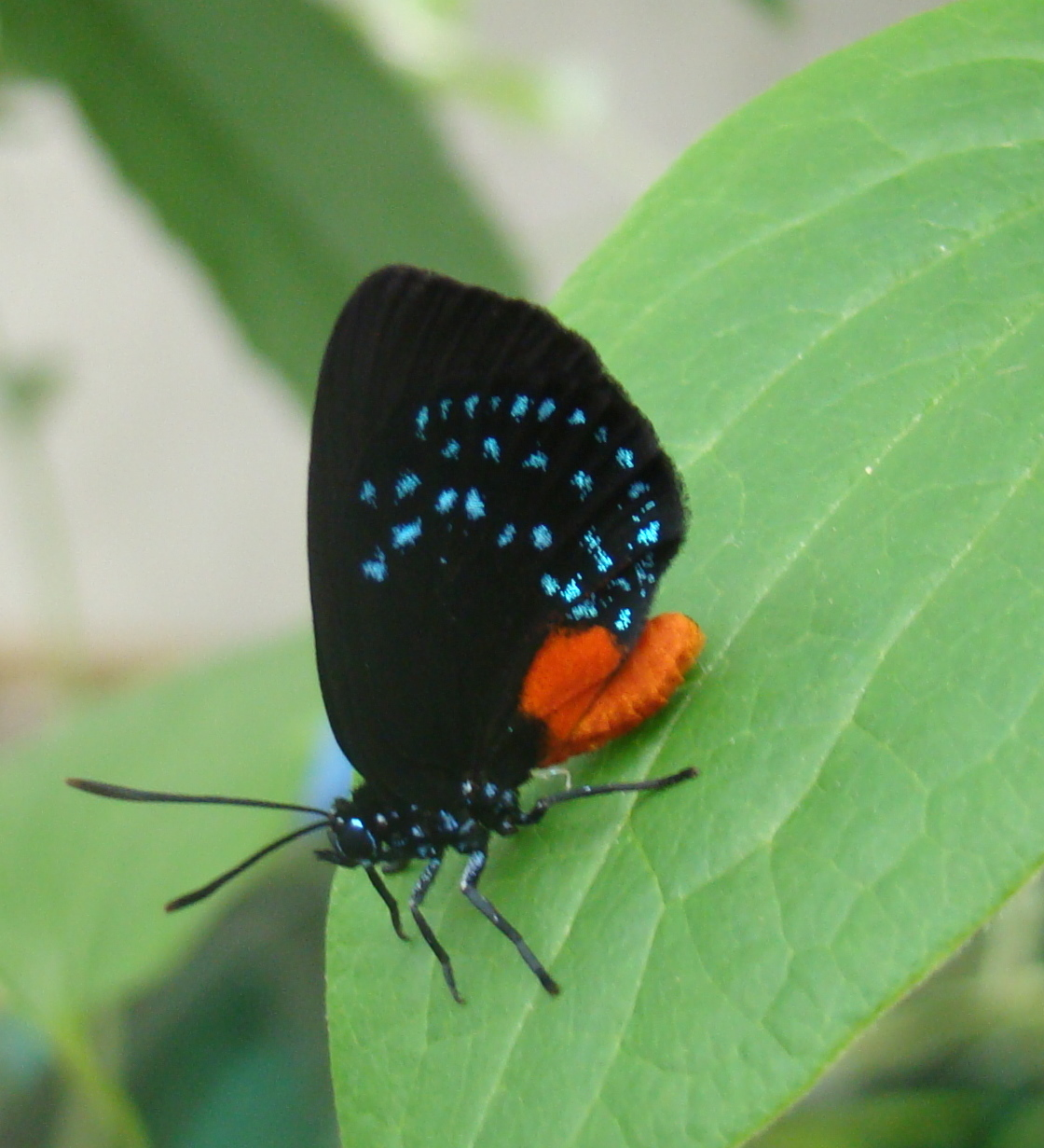
The Eumaeus atala butterfly is dependent on the coontie for its survival

The larvae of the Atala butterfly (Eumaeus atala), as well as the larvae of several other species of Eumaeus, feed exclusively on the leaves of Cycad plants. The larvae are gregarious and all life stages are aposematic, displaying coloration advertising the presence of poison. The larvae ingest cycasin (a carcinogen and neurotoxin) from Z. integrifolia leaves and retain it as adults. Both final instar larvae and adults have 0.6 to 0.9 mg of cycasin, while eggs, which are bright yellow, contain 220 to 270 μg of cycasin.

Mealybug destroyers (Cryptolaemus montrouzieri), are commonly found on Z. integrifolia. They form a mutualistic relationship by providing the plant protection from pests in exchange for food. They feed on the coonties' natural enemies, scales and mealybugs, thereby reducing the need for pesticides.

=== Parasites ===
Three of the most common pests of Z. integrifolia are Florida red scales (Chrysomphalus aonidum), hemispherical scales (Saissetia coffeae) and longtailed mealybugs (Pseudococcus longispinus). When infested, the plant's growth is stunted, and it becomes covered with blackish mold. Infestations are not limited to one species; several species can be found on the same plant.

=== Nitrogen-fixation ===
Since Z. integrifolia is a cycad, which are the only group of gymnosperms that form nitrogen-fixing associations, it depends on microbes as a source of nitrogen. It forms a symbiotic relationship with nitrogen-fixing cyanobacteria, which live in specialized roots called coralloid roots and are green in color despite not actively photosynthesizing. The filamentous cyanobacteria belonging to the genus Nostoc, which is able to form symbiosis with a wide range of organisms, inhabits the mucilage in the microaerobic and dark intercellular zone in between the inner and outer cortex of coralloid roots. This zone is transversed and connected by elongated Zamia cells. Coralloid roots are just like lateral roots, but highly specialized to contain cyanobacteria.

== Reproduction ==
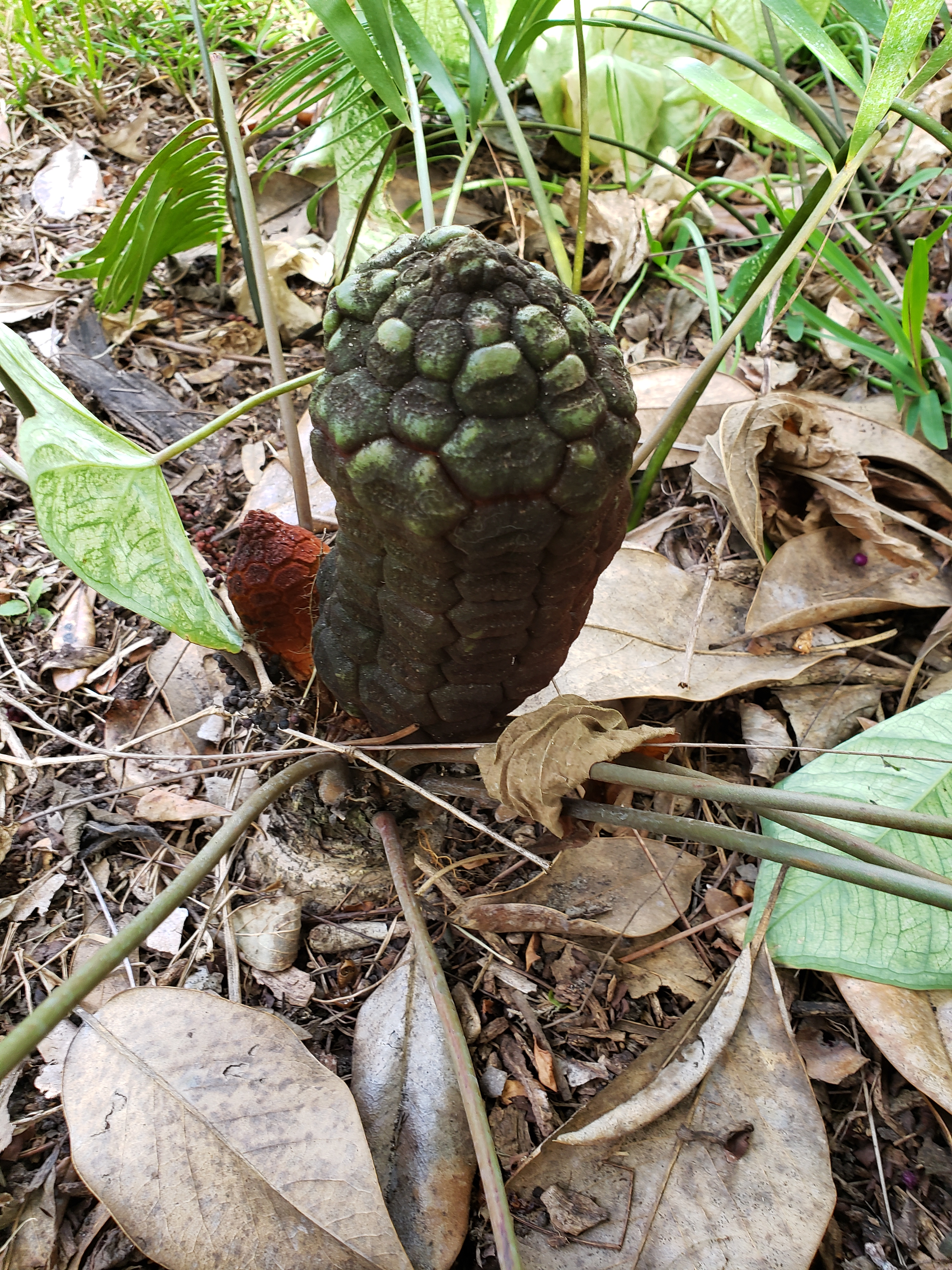
Female Z. integrifolia with mature seed cone and new cone emerging from base

Zamia species often produce more than one cone close to the tip of the stem or at the terminal of the caudex where it intersects with the aboveground stem. The cones, also called strobili, of Z. integrifolia are dioecious. The male strobilus and the female strobilus are found on two separate plants. The cones on the female plant are thick and have red-orange seeds. They also have a velvety texture, and only grow up to 6 inches. On the other hand, the ones on the male plant are narrow and tall, and contain pollen. They can reach a length of 7 inches. Female cones are usually borne singularly, whereas male cones grow in groups or clusters. The growing season of Z. integrifolia is during the spring, and the sex of the plant is undetermined until cones are produced.

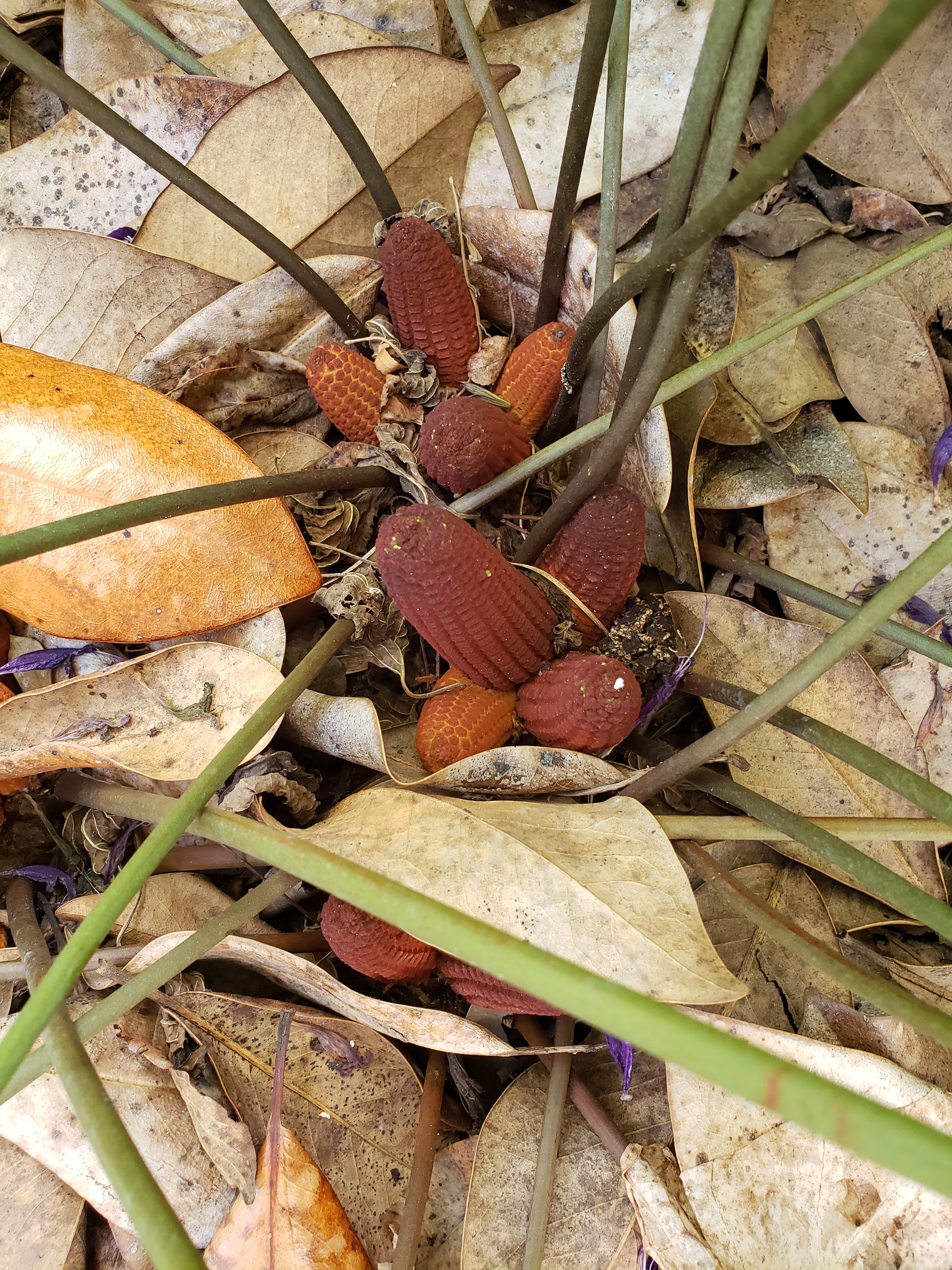
Male Z. integrifolia with multiple cones of various ages

=== Multiple cones ===
The multiple cones of Z. integrifolia may develop through three methods: sympodium, forking of the bundle system, and adventitious buds. The most common form of development is the rapid formation of cone domes on the plant's sympodium, which is its main axis. More cones are present when there is a "branching" of the bundles to the cones. The forking of the bundle system starts near the base of a terminal cone, which remains erect, of the sympodial development in certain branches. The last method is when "adventitious buds appear in the cortical tissue closely connected with the stelar system of the trunk, and these buds continue their development like typical stems".

=== Pollination ===
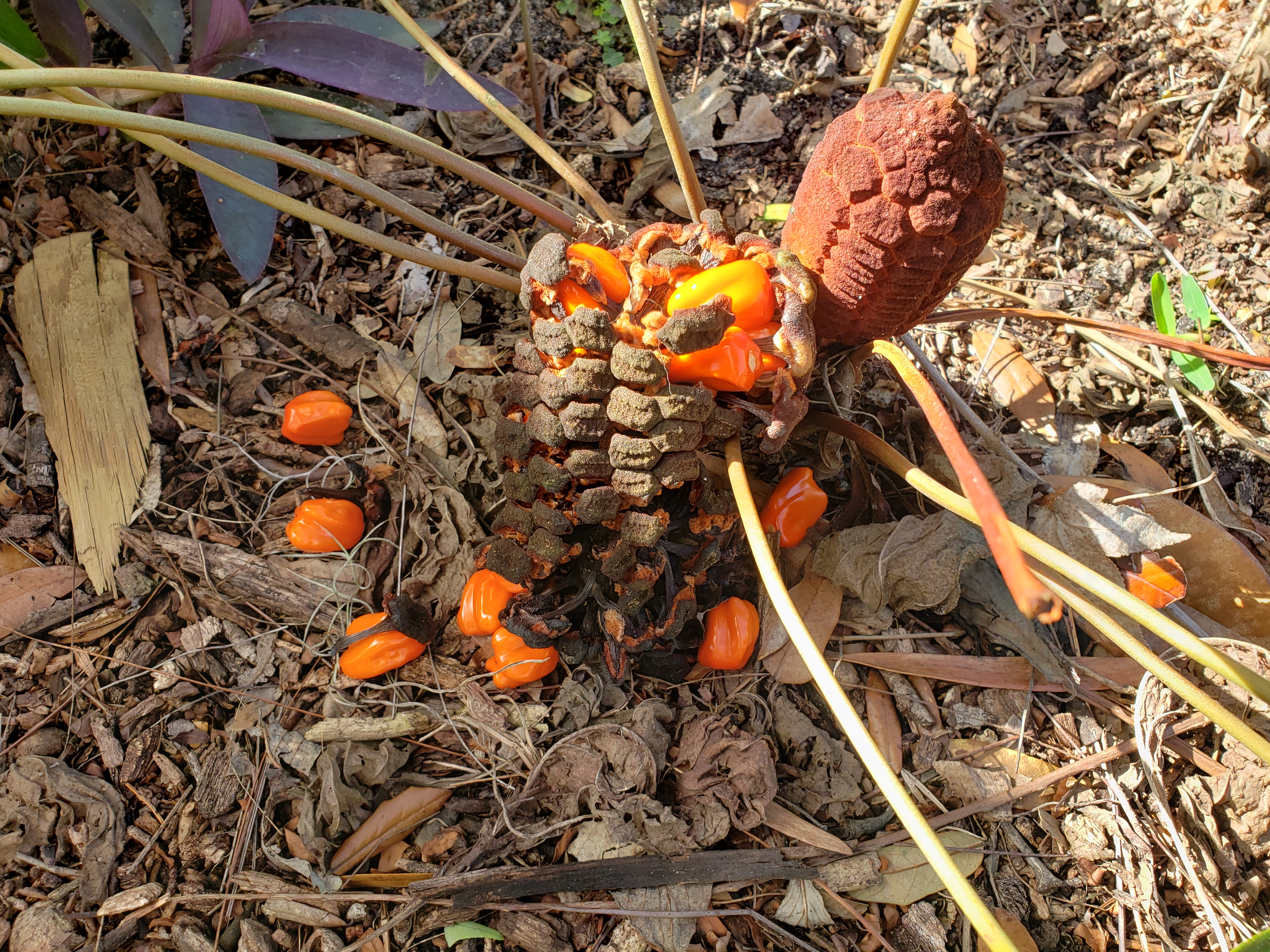
Female Z. integrifolia releasing seeds from cone

Z. integrifolia plants are pollinated by a species of weevil, Rhopalotria slossoni, and an erotylid beetle Pharaxonotha floridana. P. floridana pollinates the plants by using the pollen-bearing strobili as food for its larvae, transporting the pollen with it. The plant may regulate the mutualistic interaction by making the seed-bearing strobilis poisonous to these larvae, as the toxin beta-N-methylamino-L-alanine is present in pollen-bearing strobili but is sequestered in idioblast cells that resist insect digestion, whereas the toxin is diffusely present in the female cones.

On the other hand, R. slossoni does not consume the pollen, but rather, takes shelter in male cones where they become dusted with pollen. They then carry over these pollen into the female cones, which becomes pollinated. Although the female cones are not consumed, there have been evidences of healed scars due to punctation in the interior of the cone, which are suspected to be caused by weevils.

== Sources ==
- Calonje, Michael; Stevenson, Dennis Wm.; Osborne, Roy (2013). "The World List of Cycads" (PDF). Cycads. 5 (1): 77–119. Archived from the original (PDF) on 2024-06-20.
- Calonje, Michael; Meerow, Alan W.; Knowles, Lindy; Knowles, David; Griffith, M. Patrick; Nakamura, Kyoko; Francisco-Ortega, Javier (April 2013). "Cycad biodiversity in the Bahamas Archipelago and conservation genetics of the threatened Zamia lucayana (Zamiaceae)". Oryx. 47 (2): 190–198. doi:10.1017/S0030605312000129.
- Griffith, M. Patrick; Meerow, Alan W.; Calonje, Michael; Gonzalez, Eliza; Nakamura, Kyoko; Francisco-Ortega, Javier (March–April 2022). "Genetic Patterns of Zamia in Florida Are Consistent with Ancient Human Influence and Recent Near Extirpation". International Journal of Plant Sciences. 183 (3): 169–185. Bibcode:2022IJPlS.183..169G. doi:10.1086/717657.
- Haynes, Jody L. (2008). World List of Cycads: A Historical Review (PDF) (Report). IUCN/SSC Cycad Specialist Group.
- Meerow, Alan W.; Stevenson, Dennis W.; Moynihan, Jeremy; Francisco-Ortega, Javier (2003). "Unlocking the Coontie Conundrum: The Potential of Microsatellite DNA Studies in the Caribbean Zamia pumila Complex (Zamiaceae" (PDF). Memoirs of the New York Botanical Garden. 97: 484–518 – via Cloudfront.
- Salas-Leiva, Dayana E.; Meerow, Alan W.; Calonje, Michael; Francisco-Ortega, Javier; Griffith, M. Patrick; Nakamura, Kyoko; Sánchez, Vanessa; Knowles, Lindy; Knowles, David (May 2017). "Shifting Quaternary migration patterns in the Bahamian archipelago: Evidence from the Zamia pumila complex at the northern limits of the Caribbean island biodiversity hotspot". American Journal of Botany. 104 (5): 757–771. doi:10.3732/ajb.1700054. ISSN 0002-9122. PMID 28515078.
- Schneider, Dietrich; Wink, Michael; Sporer, Frank; Lounibos, Phillip (July 2002). "Cycads: their evolution, toxins, herbivores and insect pollinators". Naturwissenschaften. 89 (7): 281–294. Bibcode:2002NW.....89..281S. doi:10.1007/s00114-002-0330-2. PMID 12216856 – via Springer Link.
- Stevenson, Dennis Wm. (1991). "The Zamiaceae of the Southeastern United States". Journal of the Arnold Arboretum, Supplementrary Series. 1: 367–384. doi:10.5962/p.315947. JSTOR 43782788.
- Ward, Daniel B. (July 6, 2016). "Keys to the flora of Florida - 32 Zamia (Zamiaceae)" (PDF). Phytologia. 98 (3): 170–178.
