= Uraro =

Filipino cookie made from arrowroot flour

Uraró
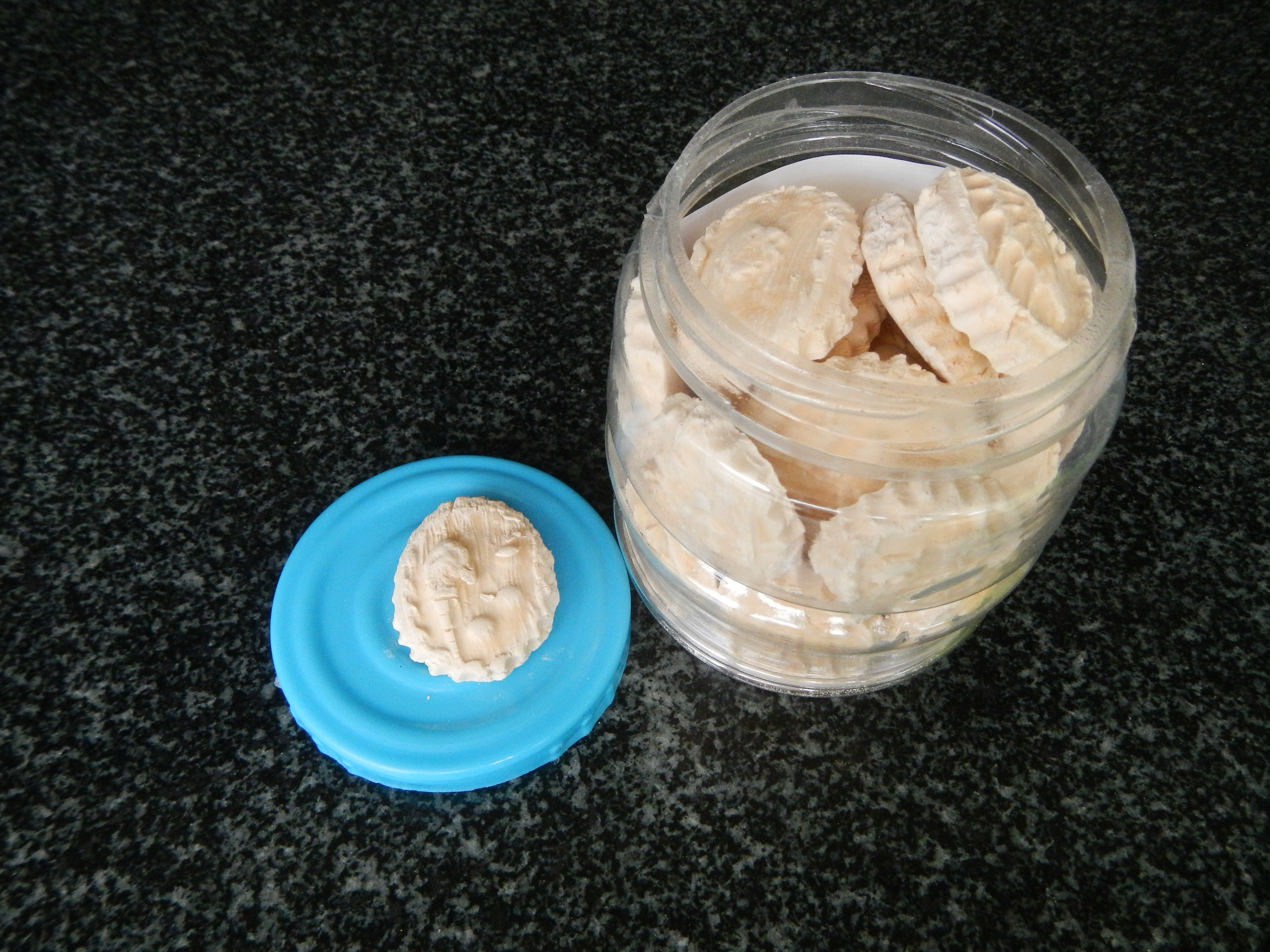
- Uraró cookies from Bataan
- Alternative names: araró, arrowroot cookies, arrowroot biscuits, galletas de Liliw
- Type: Cookie
- Place of origin: Philippines

Uraró, also known as araró or arrowroot cookies, are Filipino cookies made from arrowroot flour. They have a dry and powdery texture and are usually flower-shaped. They originate from the Tagalog people of southern Luzon, particularly in the provinces of Laguna, Quezon, and Marinduque.

== Etymology ==
The name is derived from uraró (also araró, araru, aroru, or aruru), the Tagalog and Spanish common name of the maranta arrowroot, Maranta arundinacea, the source of the flour. It is also called galletas de Lilio (Spanish for 'Liliw biscuits'), after the town of Liliw in Laguna, where it is a regional specialty.

== Description ==
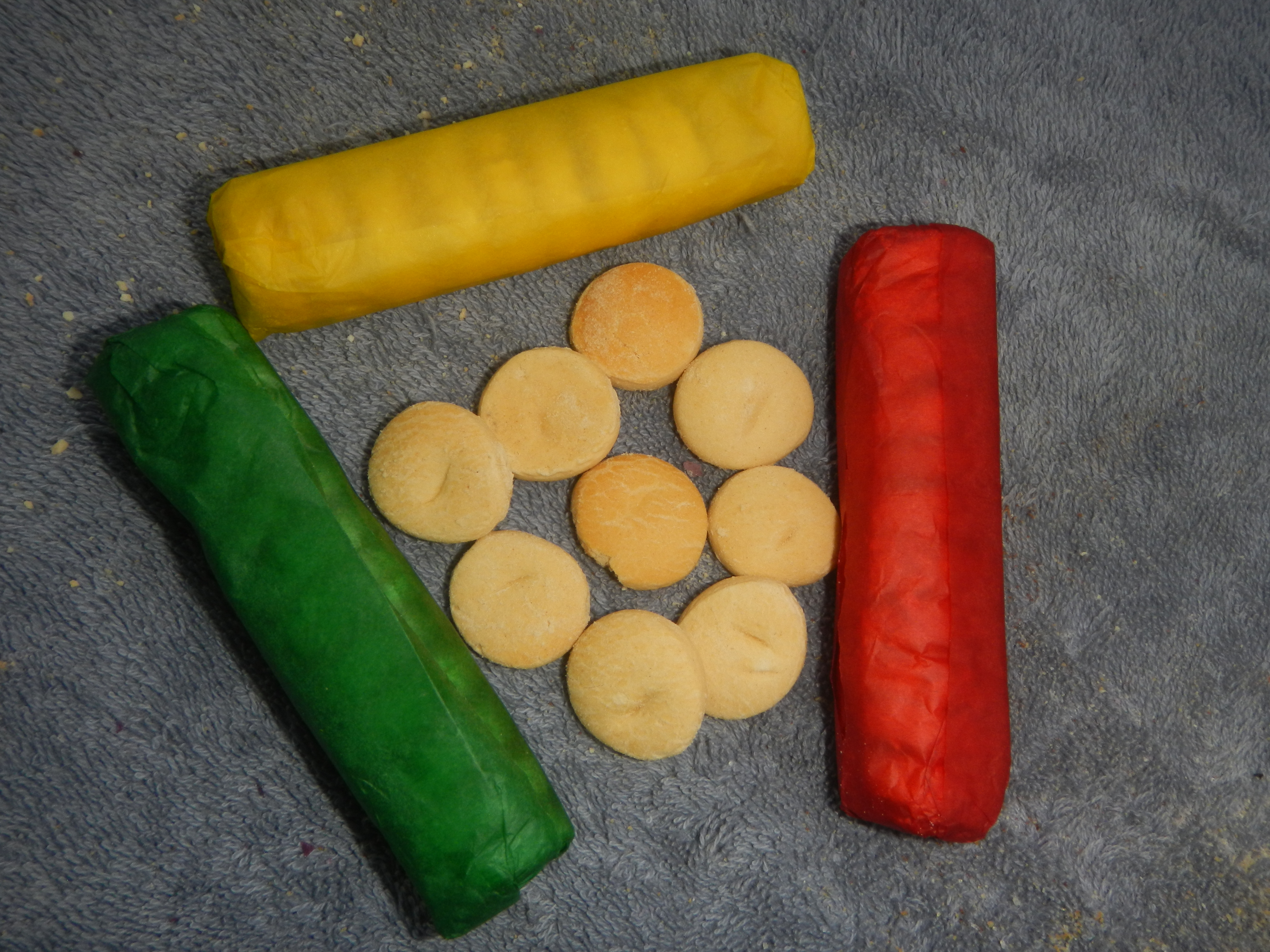
Uraró cookies from Liliw, Laguna in traditional papel de Japon wrapping

Traditional uraró production is labor-intensive, starting with the harvesting of arrowroots. The roots are washed and then crushed with a stone on a slab of hardwood in a process known as pag-ilod. The liquid resulting from this process is collected and then undergoes a second process, the pinapatining, wherein it is allowed to sit until the water separates from the starch. The water is poured off and the starchy mass is kneaded to extract more water. Finally the starch is dried and sieved through katsa (muslin) to produce the flour. The entire process takes an entire day. The flour is then mixed with rendered lard, duck egg yolks, sugar, and milk. They are then baked in a pugon, the traditional Filipino clay ovens.

Modern uraró, however, are usually made from arrowroot flour, sugar, milk, margarine (or butter), and eggs. In some cases, arrowroot flour is even substituted with tapioca flour or rice flour, resulting in poorer-quality cookies. Uraró can also be modified with other ingredients like coconut cream or maple syrup. Both of these versions usually lack the melt-in-the-mouth quality of traditional uraró made with pure arrowroot flour and lard.

Uraró are traditionally sold in cylindrical stacks wrapped in colored crêpe paper (papel de Japon). Uraró are similar in texture and are sometimes confused with puto seco, another powdery Filipino biscuit. But uraró are not as dry as puto seco and have a milky and buttery taste.

== See also ==
- Puto seco
- Polvorón
- Mamon tostado
- Rosquillos
