= Polvorón =

Andalusian shortbread

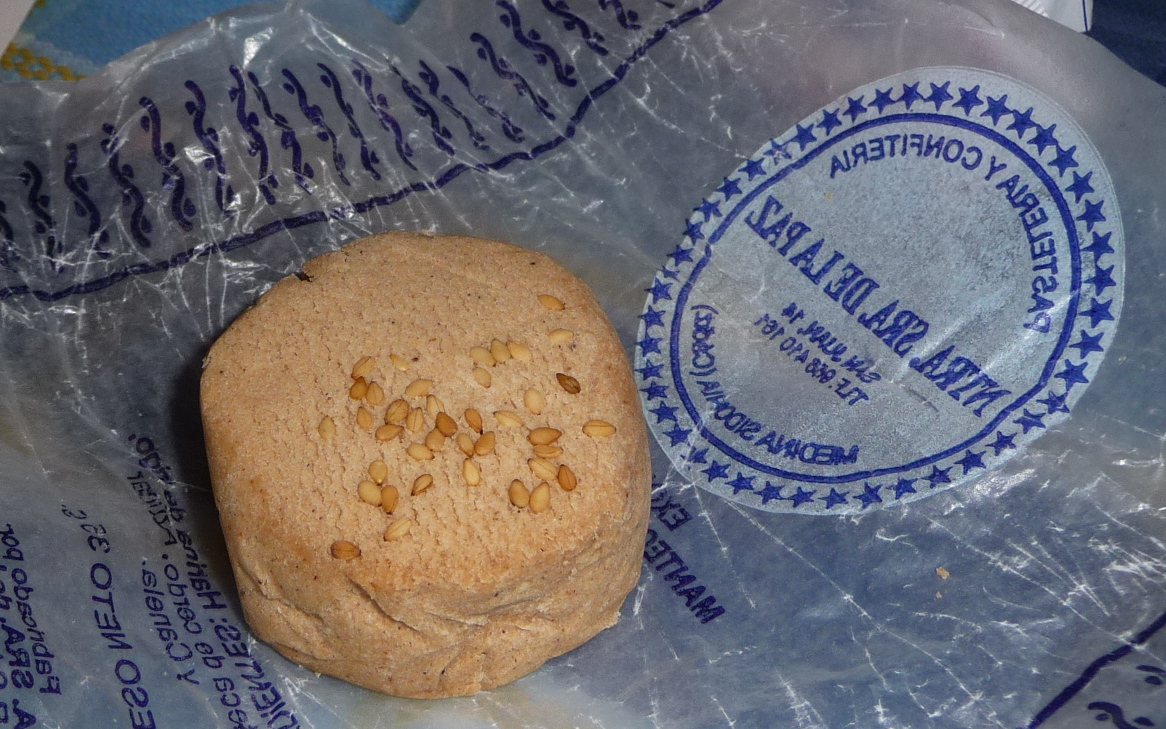
- From Medina-Sidonia in Spain
- Type: Shortbread
- Place of origin: Spain
- Region or state: Andalusia
- Main ingredients: Flour, sugar, milk, and nuts
- Similar dishes: Ghoriba; Qurabiya

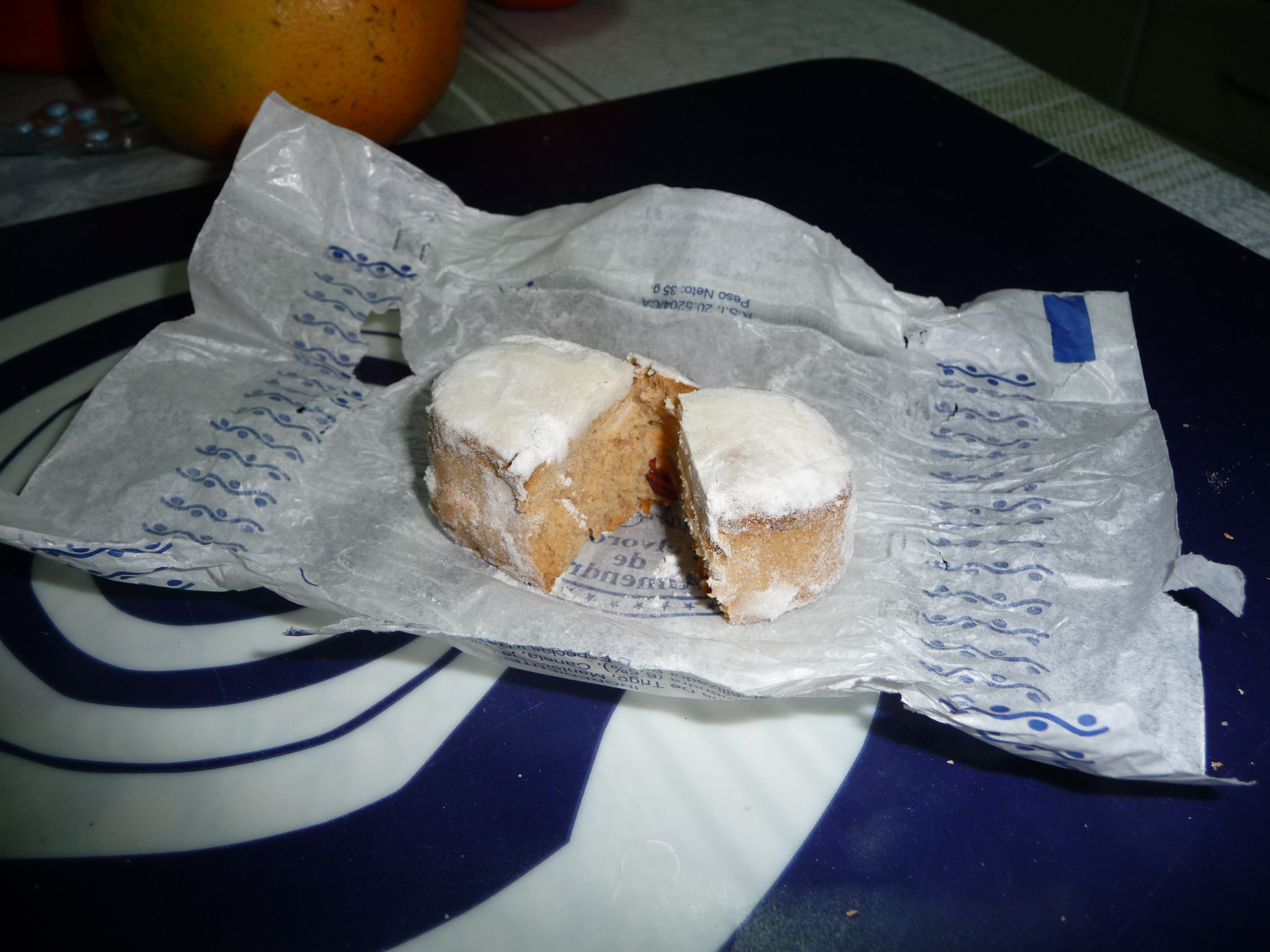
Polvorón on its paper wrapper

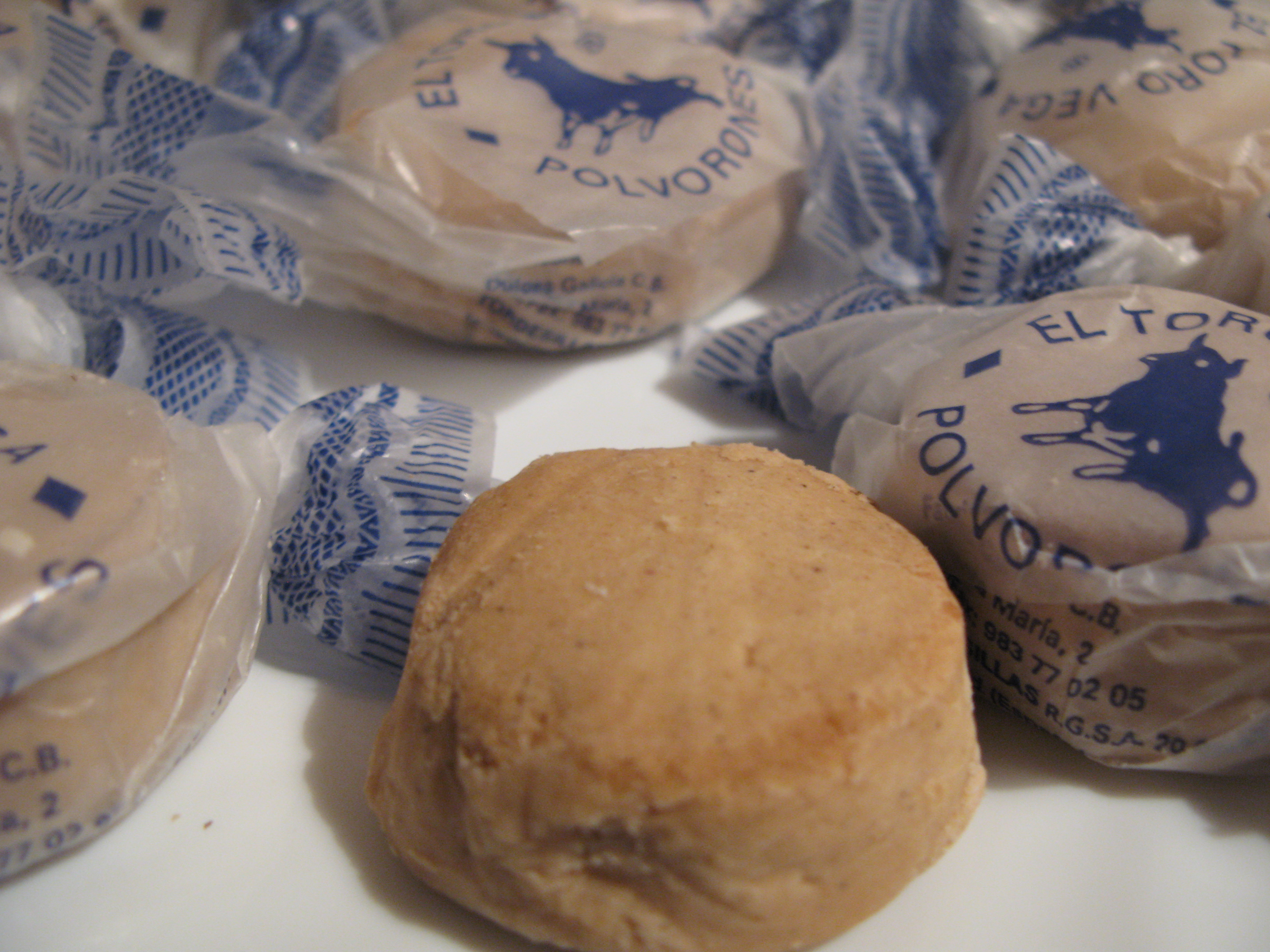
Mantecados (not polvorones) and their traditional wrappers

A polvorón (From polvo, the Spanish word for powder, or dust) is a type of heavy, soft, and very crumbly Spanish shortbread made of flour, sugar, milk, and nuts (especially almonds). They are mostly produced in Andalusia, where there are about 70 factories that are part of a syndicate that produces polvorones and mantecados. Under the name mantecados, these sweets are a traditional preparation of other areas of the Iberian Peninsula and other Spanish-speaking countries as well.

Polvorones are popular holiday delicacies in all of Spain, Hispanic America, the Philippines, and other Spanish-influenced countries around the world. Traditionally, they were prepared from September to January, but they are now available all year round.

== Mantecado ==
Mantecado is a name for a variety of Spanish shortbreads that includes the polvorón. The names are often synonymous, but not all mantecados are polvorones. The name mantecado comes from manteca (lard), usually the fat of Iberian pig (cerdo ibérico), with which they are made, while the name polvorón is based on the fact that these cakes crumble easily into a kind of dust in the hand or the mouth.

In Cuba mantecado is an ice cream and in Spain it may be also the name given to a kind of sweet sherbet. In the Philippines and Puerto Rico, mantecado is a popular traditional ice cream flavour, characterised as a mixture of vanilla and butter. It was served during the 29 September 1898 luncheon banquet that followed the Malolos Congress' ratification of the Philippine Declaration of Independence in June that year 1935.

== Regional variations ==
=== Cuba ===
Cuba has adapted the flavors of mantecado or polvorones from Spain into a beloved flavor for Cuban ice cream. This Cuban flavor has influenced ice cream flavors made in other Latin American countries such as Puerto Rico.

=== Latin America ===
Polvorones are a common Christmas dessert in Latin America. Today, there are other options for the fat used in the sweet other than lard, like butter, as well as vegetarian polvorones and mantecados made with olive oil.

=== United States ===
Sometimes called Pan de Polvo, the sweet is made with anise in the south Texas region.

=== The Philippines ===
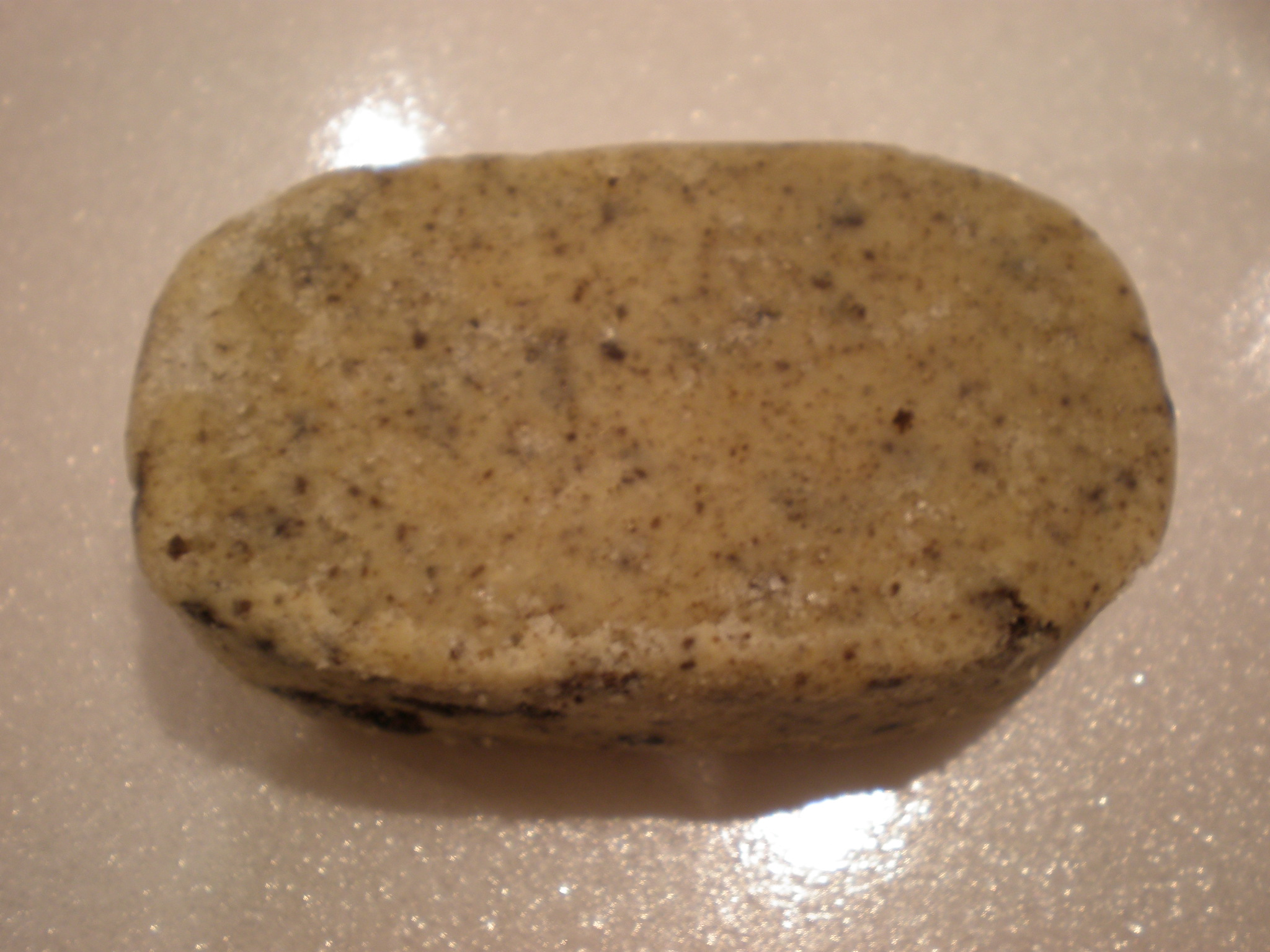
Filipino cookies 'n cream–flavored polvorón from Goldilocks Bakeshop

The Filipino version of polvorón (sometimes spelled "polboron" or "pulburon") is made from toasted flour, sugar, powdered milk, and butter or margarine instead of lard. In contrast to other polvorón, it is not baked and has a very fine powder-like and dry consistency. Though usually compressed and shaped by round or oval tin molds and individually wrapped in colorful papel de japón or cellophane, it can also be eaten in its toasted powder form stored in jars.

A number of optional ingredients can also be added to polvorón. Well-known variants include peanuts, kasuy (cashew nut), pinipig (pounded and toasted young green rice, similar to crisped rice), sprinkles, crushed Oreo cookies, powdered chocolate, mango-raspberry and ube halaya, among others. They can also be coated in chocolate.

Unlike its other counterparts, it is not considered a holiday delicacy, but rather an everyday snack. It is commonly used in town fiesta contests, where participants consume an amount of dry polvoron before they try to whistle.

== Photo gallery ==
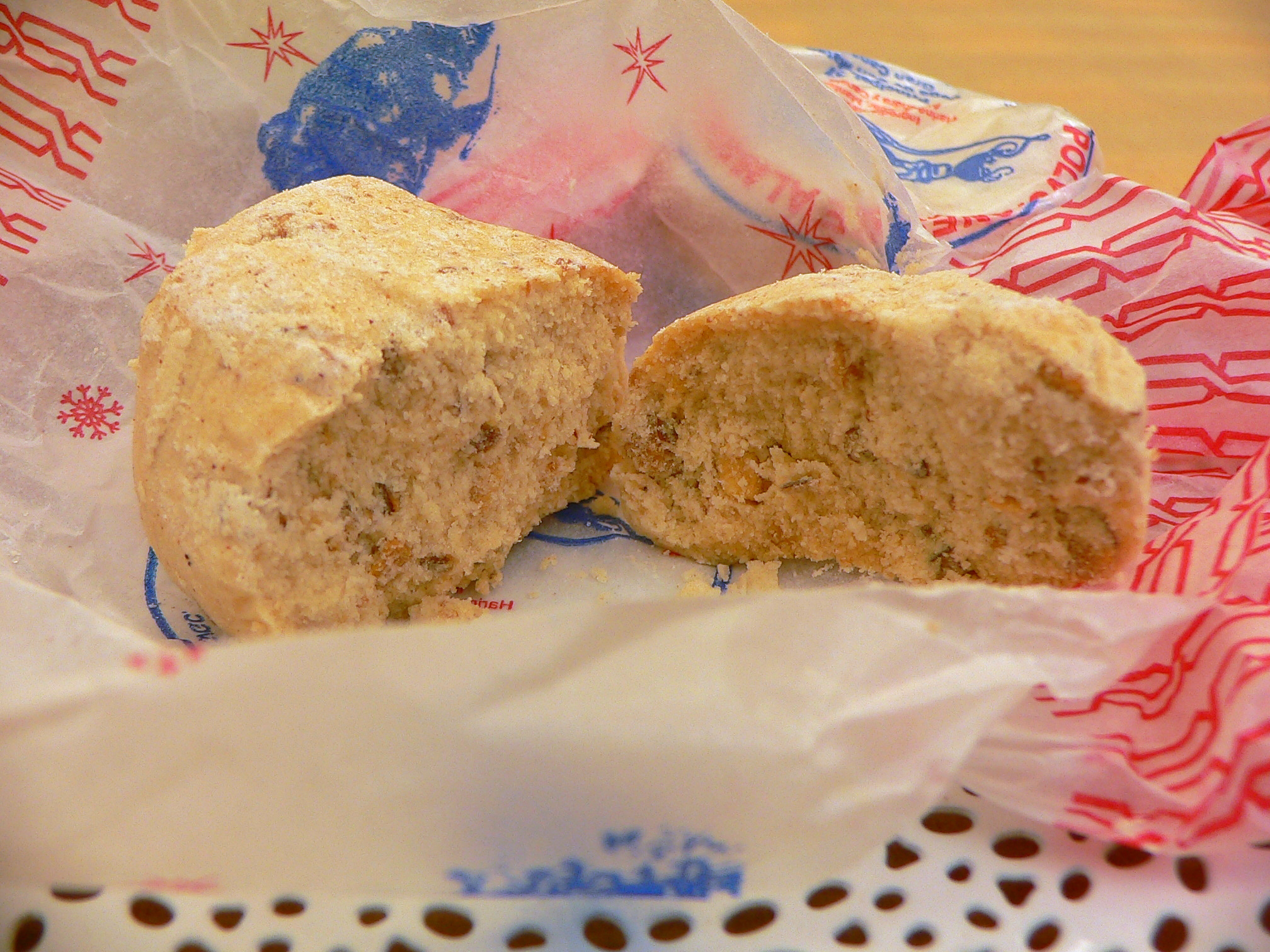
Two halves of a ''polvorón''

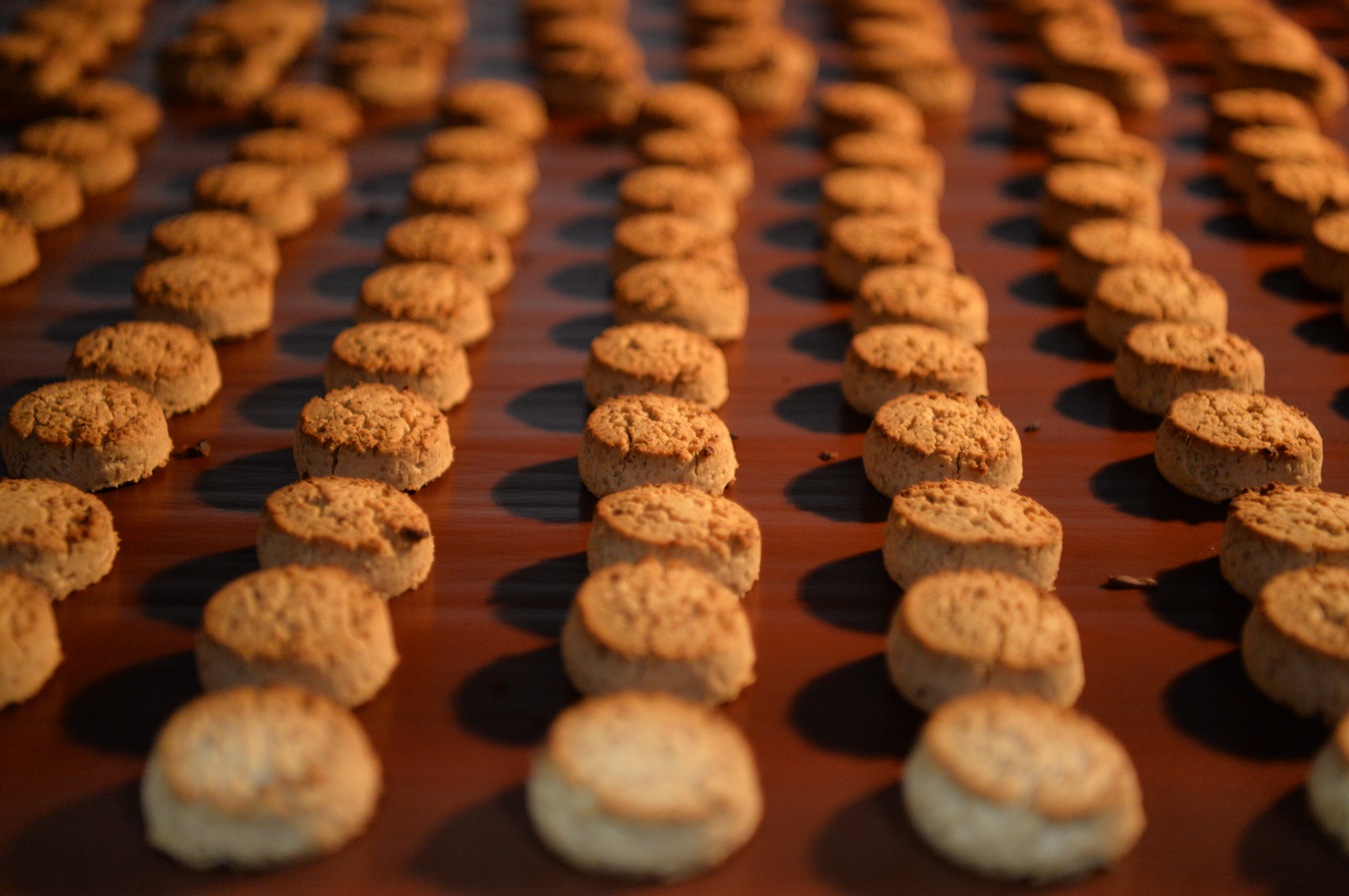
Polvoron production line in a factory in Spain

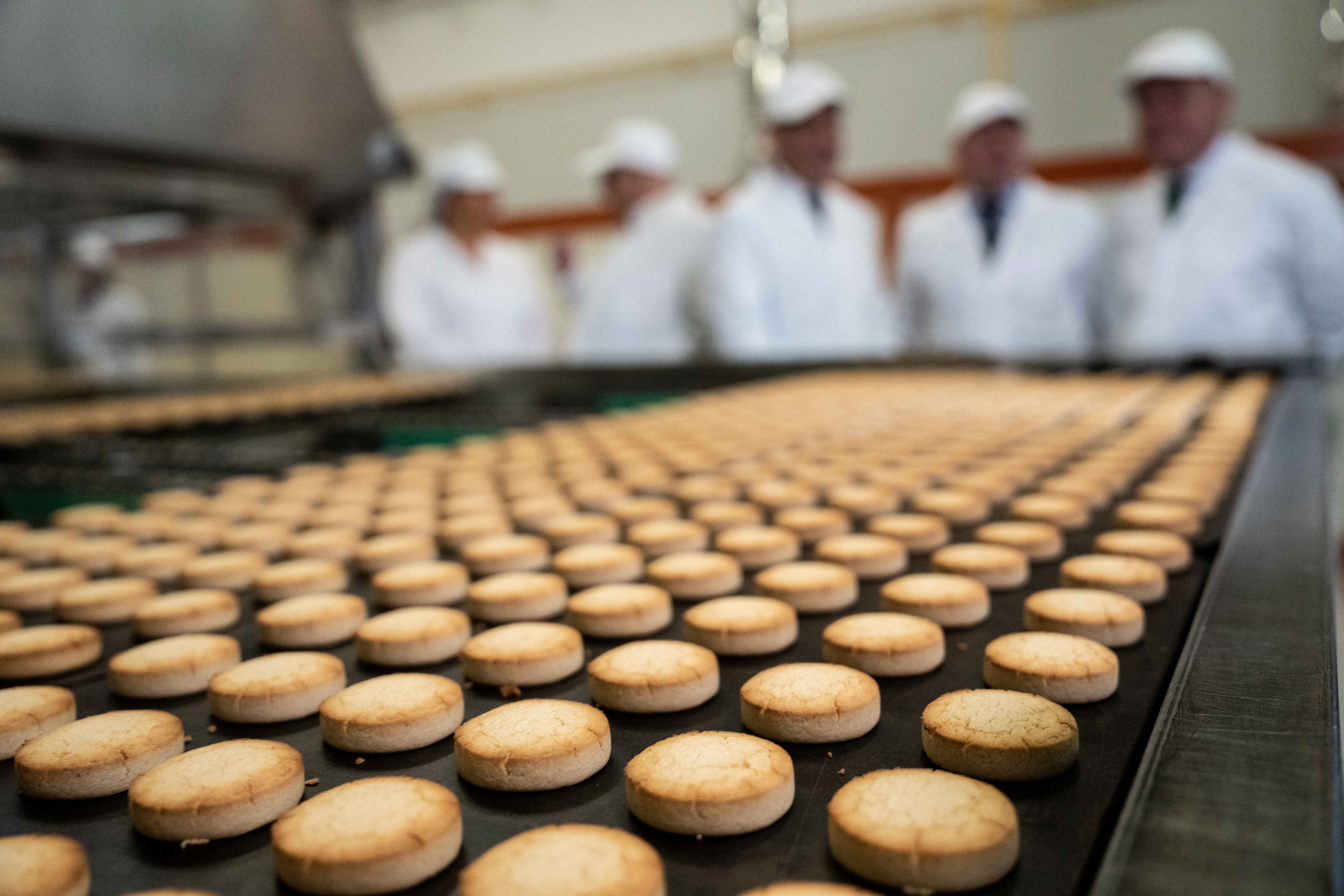
Visit of the Antequera Confectionery Industries of the Sancho Melero Group

== See also ==
- Andalusian cuisine
- Cuisine of Valladolid
- List of shortbread biscuits and cookies
- Masa podrida
- Puto seco
- Spanish cuisine
- Uraro
