= Macrozamia glaucophylla =

Conservation status
- Least Concern (IUCN 3.1)

Scientific classification
- Kingdom: Plantae
- Clade: Embryophytes
- Clade: Tracheophytes
- Clade: Spermatophytes
- Clade: Gymnospermae
- Division: Cycadophyta
- Class: Cycadopsida
- Order: Cycadales
- Family: Zamiaceae
- Genus: Macrozamia
- Species: M. glaucophylla

Binomial name
- Macrozamia glaucophylla D.L.Jones
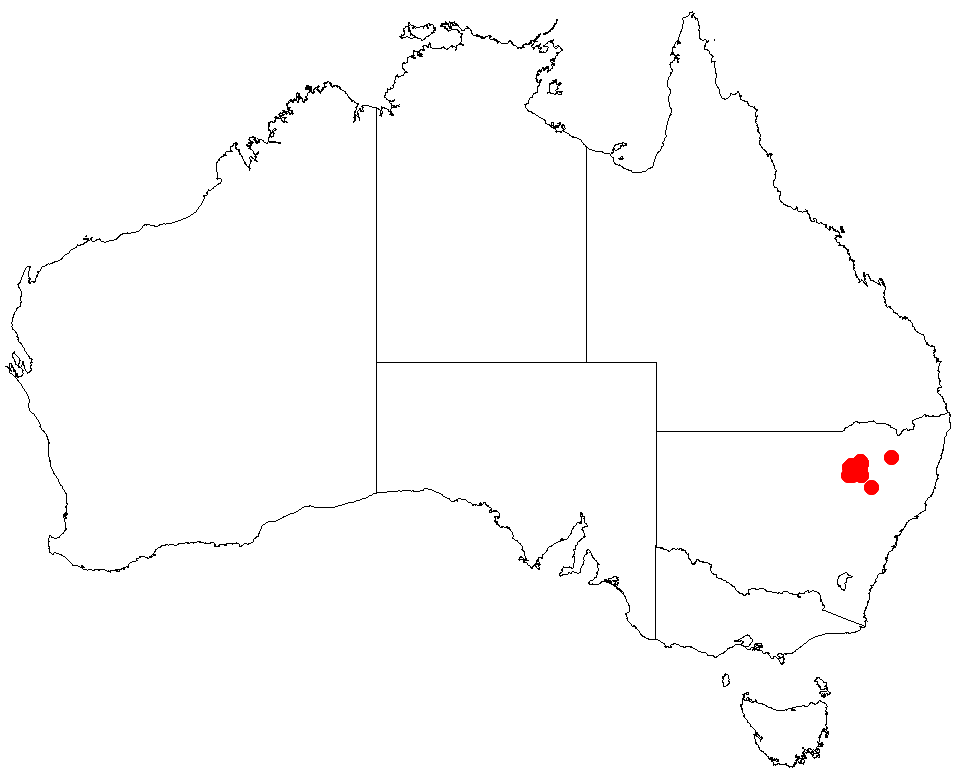
- Occurrence data from AVH

Synonyms
- Macrozamia heteromera var. glauca C.Moore; Macrozamia sp. 'Northern Pilliga'

Species of plant

Macrozamia glaucophylla is a species of cycad from the genus Macrozamia and the family Zamiaceae. Endemic to New South Wales, Australia, this species has features that resembles palms, although both species are taxonomically quite different. The current population trend of Macrozamia glaucophylla is stable with 2,500 to 10,000 mature individuals. The species are found in several habitats including forest and savanna. Ecologically, Macrozamia glaucophylla lives in terrestrial system, a land-based community of organisms where the biotic and abiotic components interact in the given area.

It is also known as zamia, zamia 'palm', wild pineapple, burrawang (NSW).

== Description ==
Macrozamia glaucophylla is a small to medium-sized cycad that has a normally subterranean unbranched caudex and has glaucous blue fronds with divided pinnae. The median pinnae are usually dichotomously branched, while the basal pinnae are not reducing to spines. The pinnae is sometimes simple, size ranging at 16 to 25 cm (6.3 to 9.8 in) long and 4 to 7 mm (0.16 to 0.28 in) wide (ultimate segments 3 to 5 cm (1.2 to 2.0 in) mm wide). Concolorous, meaning that it has the same colour throughout the surfaces, to weakly discolorous with flat margins. This plant also has large bulbous underground trunk, medium-sized and strongly keeled leaves. Macrozamia glaucophylla has red-coloured ovoid seed cones, fusiform pollen cones(25 cm (9.8 in) in length and 5 to 6 cm (2.0 to 2.4 in) in diameter), and megasporophyll with an expanded peltate apex.

Macrozamia glaucophylla is known as an attractive, tolerant to drought, rare ornamental plant with long blue-bluish glaucous leaves strongly recurved near the apex. The crown of this species has 2 to 8 number of leaves, each 60 to 120 cm (24 to 47 in) long. The leaves in Macrozamia glaucophylla are strongly to moderately keeled with 90-10 pinnae. The color is grey and green to blue with dull appearance. Petiole of Macrozamia glaucophylla is 12 to 25 cm (4.7 to 9.8 in) long and 9 to 12 cm (3.5 to 4.7 in) mm wide at the lowest pinnae. Meanwhile, the rachis of this species is not to moderately spirally twisted. The apex is entire and not spinescent.The plant is acaulescent, meaning it has a short stem concealed on the ground. The diameter of the stem is 20-40cm. Macrozamia glaucophylla has fronds that has an average height of 50 to 70 cm (20 to 28 in) from the ground surface. The maximum height reached by this plant was approximately 1.1 m (3 ft 7 in). The new fronds have glaucous blue color which changes to a bluish-green color as the plant ages. The callouses of this species are pinkish red, located at the point where the pinnae join the rachis. However, these callouses transforms in to a creamy-white color as they age.

Macrozamia glaucophylla has emerging fronds that are similar to that of Lepidozamia peroffskyana. The fronds rise almost vertically with furled pinnae. After reaching a considerable proportion of the maximum length, the pinnae begin to unfurl. Macrozamia glaucophylla generally has fronds with divided pinnae. The pinnae is normally divided into two sub-leaflets. The second division of pinnae commonly results in 3 sub-leaflets, sometimes results in the formation of 4 sub-leaflets.

Macrozamia glaucophylla has microsporophyll lamina with a length of 20 to 22 mm (0.79 to 0.87 in) and width of 19 to 22 mm (0.75 to 0.87 in). The apical spine is 2 to 15 mm (0.079 to 0.591 in) long. The female cones of Macrozamia glaucophylla are the largest in size for any section Macrozamia species in the New South Wales. The male cones are mostly green coloured, narrow in size and often curved when mature, whereas the female cones are also green, but broad and erect with two seeds on each sporophyll. The colour of the seeds also ranges from red, orange to yellow. The seed cones ovoid can reach the length of 18 to 23 cm (7.1 to 9.1 in) and diameter of 9 to 11 cm (3.5 to 4.3 in). Meanwhile, this species has megasporophyll with an expanded and peltate apex that are 20 to 30 mm (0.79 to 1.18 in) in length and 50 to 60 mm (2.0 to 2.4 in) in width. The apical spine is 2 to 10 mm (0.079 to 0.394 in) long. This species has irregular coning cycle. When the coning process occurs, generally both male and female species participate in a large group. As the result from the coning process, female Macrozamia glaucophylla will be seen to have two cones, meanwhile the male species has up to four cones. The size of seeds ovoid ranges from 30 to 34 mm (1.2 to 1.3 in) in length and 24 to 26 mm (0.94 to 1.02 in) in width. After the coning episode, plenty number of seeds, with the flesh removed by kangaroos, feral pigs, or opossums, are found near the female Macrozamia glaucophylla. These seeds usually appear with teeth marks. The size of the seed in Macrozamia glaucophylla that grows in the northern part of the distribution section are relatively larger in size than that of Macrozamia diplomera, Macrozamia heteromera, and other members of the Macrozamia genus.

=== Toxins ===
The species of Macrozamia genus including Macrozamia glaucophylla is grouped as a poisonous vascular plant, with leaflets without midribs with pale or pigmented patches at the base as the main distinguishing feature. The toxic parts of the plant are leaves, particularly the young leaves, and seeds. The weight of evidence for toxicity is 2, while the degree of danger is 3. The toxins present in Macrozamia glacuophylla is the Methylazoxymethanol (MAM), which is derived from cycad glycosides and an unidentified cycad neurotoxin, suspected to be produced by metabolism by ruminal microbes. The MAM glycosides are present more in the seeds of Australian cycads than that of the laves. The consumption of this toxin can cause zamia staggers, a disease that damages the nervous system, causing irreversible posterior ataxia and spinal corn white matter degeneration in particular. The negative effects of these toxins can directly affect mammals such as cattle, sheep, dogs, and human.

== Taxonomy and nomenclature ==
Macrozamia glaucophylla was first formally described in 1998 by David L. Jones in the Flora of Australia edited by Ken Hill and Patrick Martin McCarthy. In 1884, Charles Moore described Macrozamia heteromera var. glauca in the Journal and Proceedings of the Royal Society of New South Wales from a specimen found "near Narrabri" by Ernst Betche but the Australian Plant Census regards that name as a taxonomic synonym of M. glaucophylla. The specific epithet (glaucophylla) comes from the Ancient Greek words, glauco, meaning "bluish waxy bloom" and phyllon, meaning "leaf", referring to the bluish glaucous leaves of the species.

In respect of the cycad plants in New South Wales, there were only three named species of Zamiaceae before the revision of the M. heteromera complex by David Jones in 1998. The three species with divided pinnae are Macrozamia heteromera, Macrozamia stenomera (is concluded in Section Parazamia cycad), and Macrozamia diplomera (is concluded in Section Macrozamia cycad). David Jones named two new species of Section Parazamia cycads with divided pinnae, which are Macrozamia glaucophylla and Macrozamia polymorpha. In general, the difference between the two species are that Macrozamia glaucophylla has divided pinnae on most of the fronds, meanwhile Macrozamia polymorpha commonly has fronds with entire pinnae and does not normally have fronds with the combination of divided and entire pinnae.

== Distribution ==
Macrozamia glaucophylla is distributed within the range of the northern area of the Pilliga State Forest, south of Narrabri. This forest is also known as Pilliga Scrub, or simply, the Pilliga. The forest is located in between the town Coonabarabran and Narrabri. The overall area of the Pilliga forest exceeds 450,000 hectares after adjoining the Pilliga Nature Reserve in 1968.

Narrabri is located 215 m (705 ft) above the sea level with a significant annual average rainfall of 599 mm and precipitation falls of 23.6 inch. Narrabri has an average temperature of 19.1°C or 66.3°F. According to Köppen and Geiger, Narrabri is classified as Cfa (humid subtropical) with warm and temperate climate.

The yearly rainfall in Narrabri occurred occasionally during summer, taking one-third of the rainfall. On a seasonal basis, the rest two-third are spread equally throughout the rest of the year. The seasonal rainfall pattern of Narrabri described in numbers are: Summer (33%), Autumn (22%), Winter (21%), and Spring (24%).

Based on the affinities, Macrozamia glaucophylla is related to both Macrozamia stenomera and Macrozamia heteromera. Macrozamia glaucophylla, which usually grows at the northern part of the distribution range, have a larger size, more significant number of fronds, along with crowned pinnae which makes Macrozamia glaucophylla look more bushy and dense, similar to that of Macrozamia stenomera. On the other hand, the cycads that grow at the southern part of the distribution are smaller in size, with smaller stature and more orderly pinnae, hence, are more similar to that of Macrozamia heteromera.

== Habitat ==
Macrozamia glaucophylla, which is a natural and endemic plant from Australia, is often found around Gunnedah and the Pilliga Scrub, New South Wales, from southern to the northern part of the forest. This species grows in dry sclerophyll woodlands, especially in deep sandy soils. Locally, the species is abundant, but the populations of Macrozamia glaucophylla are sporadic.

== Ecology ==
Macrozamia glaucophylla grows in either a pattern of isolated individual botanicas or in thick, populated stands formed in scattered locations. The species usually grows in sandy and deep soil, below a sparse canopy of either Acacia spp., Callitris spp. (principally Callitris glaucophylla - white cypress pine) or Eucalyptus spp. (Eucalyptus crebra, Eucalyptus elegans, and Eucalyptus racemosa var. longiflora – narrow-leaved ironbark). In addition, the canopy cover provided by these plants for Macrozamia glaucophylla is the most exposed and open canopy cover among the cycad group in the New South Wales. Kangaroos, feral pigs and possums are involved in eating the flesh of the seed of Macrozamia glaucophylla, by taking the seed near the tree and drop it underneath. The seeds eaten by feral pigs usually appear with teeth marks.

=== Dependent Mutualism ===
The insect pollinators of cycads including that of Macrozamia glaucophylla conduct highly specialised mutualism symbiosis with the hosts. Both insect pollinators and Macrozamia glaucophylla are not able to survive in a long term without the presence of the other organism. The pollination that occurs in Macrozamia glaucophylla is considered as passive pollination, which means there are no specialised morphological structure in the said individuals that qualify as active pollination. On the other hand, cycads also form coralloid roots, which are advanced and specialised structures that accommodate endosymbiotic cyanobacteria.

== Cultivation ==
As a member of the cycad group, Macrozamia glaucophylla requires minimum attention and is undemanding in its environmental needs for cultivation. Hence, Macrozamia glaucophylla is ideal for low-maintenance garden. The genus Macrozamia mixes well with other plants, including palms, bromeliads, succulents, and grass trees. Macrozamia glaucophylla is suitable for either in-ground plantings or contains. Nevertheless, this species has sharp leaflets and spines on the cone scales and leaf bases which are not suitable for children and pets. If the raw fruit is eaten, the consequences may cause either severe gastro-intestinal irritation such as stomach cramps, nausea, vomiting and diarrhoea, or headache. In several rare cases, the consumption of the raw fruit of Macrozamia glaucophylla has been reported to cause liver damage, coma, and also death. The male cone of Macrozamia glaucophylla has a fruity, appetizing smell when releasing the pollen, however, this smell has been recorded as causes of respiratory distress.

The cultivation process of Macrozamia glaucophylla is similar with other Macrozamia (section Parazamia) species. The cycad seed is germinated in cliptop plastic bags that are filled with slightly damp perlite and vermiculite soaked in fungicide in a cool place. The purpose of this method is to prevent early germination. After the germination process occurs, the seed is put on a hot bed until the root grows and reach 25 to 50 mm (0.98 to 1.97 in) in length. The plant is then moved to the community pots (at least 300 mm (12 in) deep) in order to minimize the possibility for the root to dry out before it has grown too long, and to enhance root development in a moderate space. Seedlings can be removed from the pot to an individual container after 1-2 years. Cycads are fertilized with slow release Osmocote or Nutricote. The common mistakes made in cycad cultivation is keeping the environment in a too damp, or letting the germination process occurs earlier than the process should be. In order to determine whether the plant is ready to germinate or not, few numbers of seedlings can be placed in damp vermiculite in another bag.
