= Zamia splendens =

Conservation status
- Endangered (IUCN 3.1)

Scientific classification
- Kingdom: Plantae
- Clade: Embryophytes
- Clade: Tracheophytes
- Clade: Gymnosperms
- Division: Cycadophyta
- Class: Cycadopsida
- Order: Cycadales
- Family: Zamiaceae
- Genus: Zamia
- Species: Z. splendens

Binomial name
- Zamia splendens Schutzman

Species of cycad

Zamia splendens is a species of cycad plant in the family Zamiaceae found in tropical rainforests in southern Mexico. Described in 1984, it was later classified as a synomyn of other Zamia species, but is now recognized as a valid species by most authorities.

== Etymology ==
The specific epithet splendens refers to the very glossy leaves.

== Classification history ==
Zamia splendens was described and named by Schutzman in 1984. It was placed under synomyny to Z. verschaffeltii in 1998, and under synomyny to Z. katzeriana in 2008. Pérez-Farrera et al. removed Z. splendens from synonymy with Z. kazeriana in 2016, treating both of them as valid species, and described Z. verschaffeltii as probably extinct. As of March 2025, Z. splendens is accepted as a valid species by the World List of Cycads, the World Flora Online, and Tropicos. It remains listed as a synonym of Z. vershaffeltii by the Royal Botanic Gardens, Kew.

In 1998, a population of Zamia in the Selva Lacandona in eastern Chiapas that was initially included in Zamia splendens was described as a new species, Z. lacandona, based on strobili (reproductive cone) morphological and cytological differences.

== Description ==
The stem of Zamia splendens is subterranean, occasionally branched (more than one apex showing above ground), and grey in color. There are two to four compound leaves on a stem apex forming an arching crown standing 0.3 to 1 metre (1 ft 0 in to 3 ft 3 in) tall in the wild, up to 2 metres (6 ft 7 in) in cultivation. The leaves on plants in some populations emerge bright red in color, while those in other populations emerge light-green. Prickles up to 0.4 centimetres (0.16 in) in length may be present on the petiole (leaf stalk). There are 8 to 20 leaflets on a leaf. Leaflets are stiff, 9 to 35 centimetres (3.5 to 13.8 in) long and 3 to 6.5 centimetres (1.2 to 2.6 in) wide. They are long-elliptic through oblong to lanceolate, with teeth along the edges most of the way back from the apex, most frequently near the apex. The teeth are 0.5 to 2.5 millimetres (0.020 to 0.098 in) long. Leaflets are a very glossy bright green, with visible veins 1.5 to 2.5 millimetres (0.059 to 0.098 in) apart.

Like all cycads, Zamia splendens is dioecious, with plants being either male or female. There are two or more male strobili (cones) on a stem apex. The cones are conical, 4 to 5 centimetres (1.6 to 2.0 in) long and 1.1 to 1.3 centimetres (0.43 to 0.51 in) in diameter. They either hang down from or lie on the ground on 8 to 14 centimetres (3.1 to 5.5 in) long peduncles (stalks). The male cones are light brown and covered with hairs. The female strobili are subglobose or ellipsoid, 7 centimetres (2.8 in) long and 4.5 centimetres (1.8 in) in diameter. They start light-brown and covered in hair, later turning dark green and losing the hairs. Seeds are obovoid, up to 15 millimetres (0.59 in) long and 7 millimetres (0.28 in) in diameter. The sarcotesta (seed coat) is pink to scarlet at maturity. The chromosome number is 2n=16. The weevil Rhopalotria furfuracea has been found with Z. splendens, presumably as a pollinator.

== Range and habitat ==
Z. splendens is endemic to rainforests in the Mexican states of Chiapas, Tabasco, and southeastern Veracruz at elevations below 1,000 metres (3,300 ft) above sea level, and more specifically in the "understory of primary evergreen tropical rain forests on karstic rock or clay soil between 100 and 800 metres (330 and 2,620 ft) above sea level".

== Proposed hybridization ==
Zamia "Mexican clade" tree based on DNA

- Mexican clade
  - - - Zamia lacandona
      - Zamia grijalvensis
    - - - Zamia purpurea
        - - Zamia cremnophila
          - Zamia splendens
  - - - Zamia herrerae
      - Zamia paucijuga
    - - - Zamia prasina
        - Zamia variegata
      - - - Zamia spartea
          - - Zamia furfuracea
            - Zamia loddigesii

It has been proposed that Zamia splendens has been involved in hybridization events with Z. loddigesii, resulting in the creation of Z. grijalvensis and Z. katzeriana. An objection to the proposed hybridization that resulted in Z. katzeriana is that Z. splendens has a chromosome number of 2n=16, while Z. loddigesii has a chromosome number of 2n=18, making it difficult to explain how Z. katzeriana has a chromosome number of 2n=16. (Z. grijalvensis has a chromosome number of 2n=19, 20.) A molecular genetics study placed Z. splendens and Z. loddigesii in the same "Mexican" clade, although not the closest species to each other. That study placed Z. splendens in a "Purpurea" sub-clade with K. lacandona (2n=16, 17, 18), Z. grijalvensis (2n=19, 20), Z. purpurea (2n=16), and Z. cremnolphila (2n=16). Z. katzeriana was not included in the molecular study, but is likely the closest relative to Z. splendens.

An analysis of morphological and anatomical characteristics of Zamia splendens, Z. katzeriana, and Z. loddigesii concluded that, while there has been some admixture between Z. splendens and Z. loddigesii, Z. katzeriana is not a hybrid of Z. splendens and Z. loddigesii, but rather that Z. katzeriana and Z. loddigesii are descended from Z. splendens or a direct ancestor of Z. splendens. A limited amount of admixture occurred between Z. splendens and Z. loddigesii more than a few generations in the past. (Due to the slow growth of Zamia species, the average generation period is estimated to be ten years.)

== Sources ==
- Calonje, Michael; Meerow, Alan W.; Griffith, M. Patrick; Sala-Leiva, Dayana; Vovides, Andrew P.; Ciro, Mario; Francisco-Ortega, Javier (May 2019). "A Time-Calibrated Species Tree Phylogeny of the New World Cycad Genus Zamia L. (Zamiaceae, Cycadyles)". International Journal of Plant Sciences. 180 (4): 271–355. doi:10.1086/702642.
- Gutiérrez-Ortega, José Said; Pérez-Farrera, Miguel Angel; Lopez, Sergio; Vovides, Andrew P (May 2023). "Demographic history and species delimitation of three Zamia species (Zamiaceae) in south-eastern Mexico: Z. katzeriana is not a product of hybridization". Botanical Journal of the Linnean Society. 202 (1): 110–133. doi:10.1093/botlinnean/boac062. ISSN 0024-4074.
- Nicolalde-Morejón, Fernando; Vovides, Andrew P.; Stevenson, Dennis W.; Sosa, Victoria (2008). "The identity of Zamia katzeriana and Z. verschaffeltii (Zamiaceae)". Brittonia. 60 (1): 38–48. doi:10.1007/s12228-008-9000-9. ISSN 0007-196X.
- Pérez-Farrera, Miguel Ángel; Vovides, Andrew P.; Martínez-Camilo, Rubén; Martínez-Meléndez, Nayely; Gómez-Domínguez, Héctor; Galicia-Castellanos, Sonia (2012). "Zamia grijalvensis sp. nov. (Zamiaceae, Cycadales) from Chiapas, Mexico with notes on hybridization and karyology". Nordic Journal of Botany. 30 (5): 565–570. doi:10.1111/j.1756-1051.2012.01453.x. ISSN 1756-1051.
- Pérez-Farrera, Miguel A.; Vovides, Andrew P.; Ruiz-Castillejos, Christian; Galicia, Sonia; Cibrián-Jaramillo, Angélica; López, Sergio (2016). "Anatomy and morphology suggest a hybrid origin of Zamia katzeriana (Zamiaceae)". Phytotaxa. 270 (3): 161–181. doi:10.11646/phytotaxa.270.3.1.
- Schutzman, Bart (1984). "A New Species of Zamia L. (Zamiaceae, Cycadales) from Chiapas, Mexico" (PDF). Phytologia. 55 (5): 299–304 – via The Cycad Society.
- Schutzman, Bart; Vovides, Andrew P. (1998). "A New Zamia (Zamiaceae, Cycadales) from Eastern Chiapas, Mexico". Novon. 8 (4): 441–446. doi:10.2307/3391871. ISSN 1055-3177. JSTOR 3391871.
