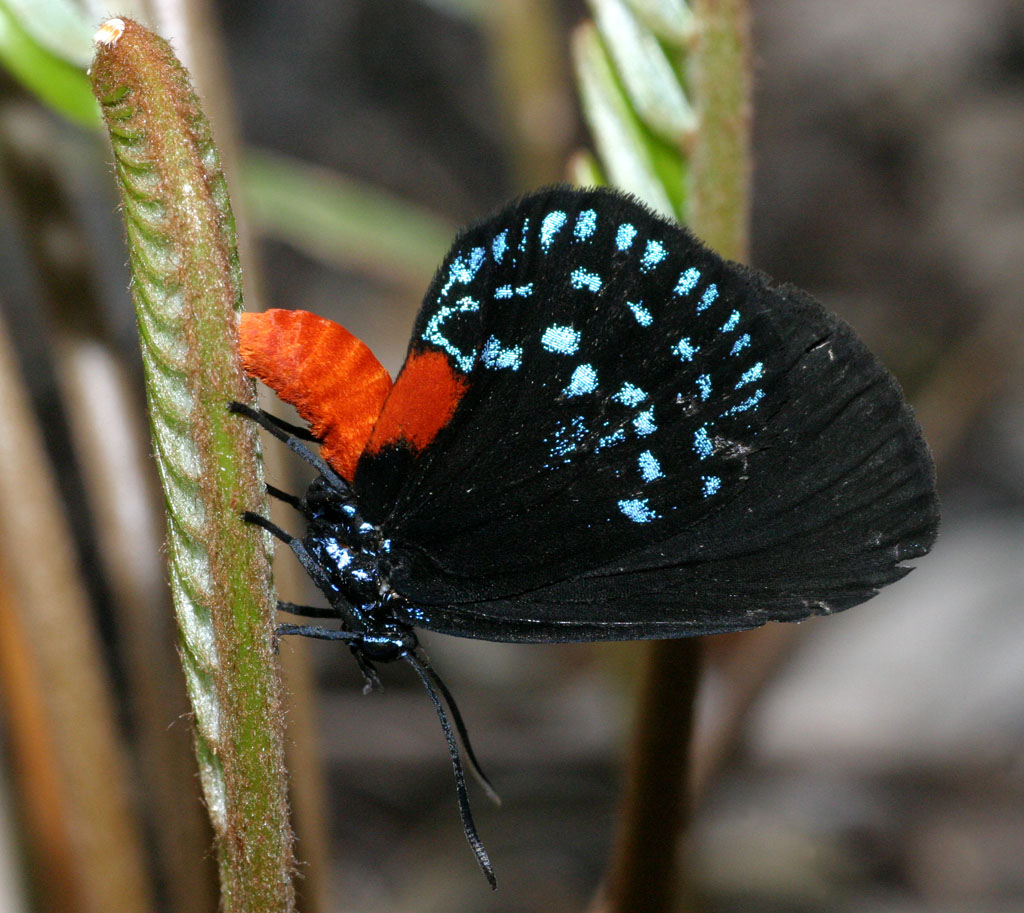
- Eumaeus atala female.

Scientific classification
- Kingdom: Animalia
- Phylum: Arthropoda
- Clade: Pancrustacea
- Class: Insecta
- Order: Lepidoptera
- Family: Lycaenidae
- Tribe: Eumaeini
- Genus: Eumaeus; Hübner, 1819

= Eumaeus (butterfly) =

Butterfly genus in family Lycaenidae

Eumaeus is a genus of butterflies in the family Lycaenidae, commonly known as cycadians. All known species are obligate herbivores on cycads.

== Distribution ==
Species of Eumaeus occur from central Mexico, Florida, and the West Indies to Bolivia, Brazil and Peru. E. atala occurs in the West Indies and Florida. E. childrenae and E. toxea both occur in Mexico, with some overlap in their ranges. E. godartii occurs in the Isthmus (southern Nicaragua, Costa Rica, and Panama) and western South America. E. minyas and E. toxana both occur in South America east of the Andes. Their ranges are not well understood, but overlap in Peru. The Isthmus and South American species of Eumaeus, E. godartii, E. minyas, and E. toxana, form a clade.

== Obligate herbivory ==
Caterpillars of the genus Eumaeus are obligate herbivores of cycads in the genera Zamia, Dioon, and Ceratozamia. The caterpillars normally feed on leaves and stems, but in some cases have been observed feeding on strobili (reproductive cones). Cycads harbor many toxins, including cycasin (a carcinogenic) and neurotoxic glucoside. Other glucoside toxins present may include macrozamin (de) and several neocycasins. Eumaeus caterpillars have aposematic coloration, being bright red with yellow or white bands, and adults have red elements on their body and wings. The caterpillars sequester and retain the toxins consumed from cycad plant tissue, rendering all stages of Eumaeus distasteful to predators.

== Zamia hosts ==
With one known exception, each Zamia species hosts only one species of Eumaeus caterpillars. Relationships of many Zamia and Eumaeus species had not been established as of 2023. The known host dependencies of Eumaeus species on Zamia species include: Species in the Florida/Caribbean clade are hosts for caterpillars of E. atala. Species in the Fisheri clade, and Z. cremnophila of the Mega-Mexico A sub-clade, are hosts for caterpillars of E. childrenae. Some species in the Z. loddigessii species complex of the Mega-Mexico A sub-clade are hosts for caterpillars of E. toxea. Many species in the South American west of the Andes clade are hosts for caterpillars of E. godartii. Several species in the South American east of the Andes clade are hosts for caterpillars of E. minyas. One Zamia species found east of the Andes, Z. poeppigiana, is host for caterpillars of both E. minyas and E. toxana. Another Zamia species east of the Andes, Z. amazonum, also hosts caterpillars of E. toxana.

== Selected species ==
Image	Species	Common name	Range	Notes
	E. atala (Poey, 1832)	Atala	West Indies, Florida	
	E. toxea (Godart, 1824)	Mexican cycadian	Eastern and western Mexico to Nicaragua (southern Texas as very rare stray)	
	E. childrenae (G. Gray, 1832)	Great cycadian	Eastern and southern Mexico to Honduras	[= E. debora]
	E. godartii (Boisduval, 1870)	White-tipped cycadian	Nicaragua to western Ecuador	
	E. minyas (Hübner, [1809])	Minyas cycadian	Colombia to Peru and central Brazil	
	E. toxana (Boisduval, 1870)		Venezuela to Bolivia	

== Sources ==
- Sierra-Botero, Laura; Calonje, Michael; Robbins, Robert K.; Rosser, Neil; Pierce, Naomi E.; López-Gallego, Cristina; Valencia-Montoya, Wendy A. (April 2023). "Cycad phylogeny predicts host plant use of Eumaeus butterflies". Ecology and Evolution. 13 (4) e9978. Bibcode:2023EcoEv..13E9978S. doi:10.1002/ece3.9978. ISSN 2045-7758. PMC 10085819. PMID 37056692.
- Whitaker, Melissa R. L.; Salzman, Shayla (2020). Turlings, Ted (ed.). "Ecology and evolution of cycad-feeding Lepidoptera". Ecology Letters. 23 (12): 1862–1877. Bibcode:2020EcolL..23.1862W. doi:10.1111/ele.13581. ISSN 1461-023X. PMID 32969575.
