= Eumaeus (disambiguation) =

Eumaeus (Εὔμαιος, Eumaios), in Greek mythology, was Odysseus's swineherd and friend.

Eumaeus may also refer to:

- Eumaeus (butterfly), a genus of butterflies in the family Lycaenidae
- "Eumaeus" (Ulysses episode), an episode in James Joyce's novel Ulysses
- Eumaeus, a character in New Gold Dreams, a web-comic by R. K. Milholland
