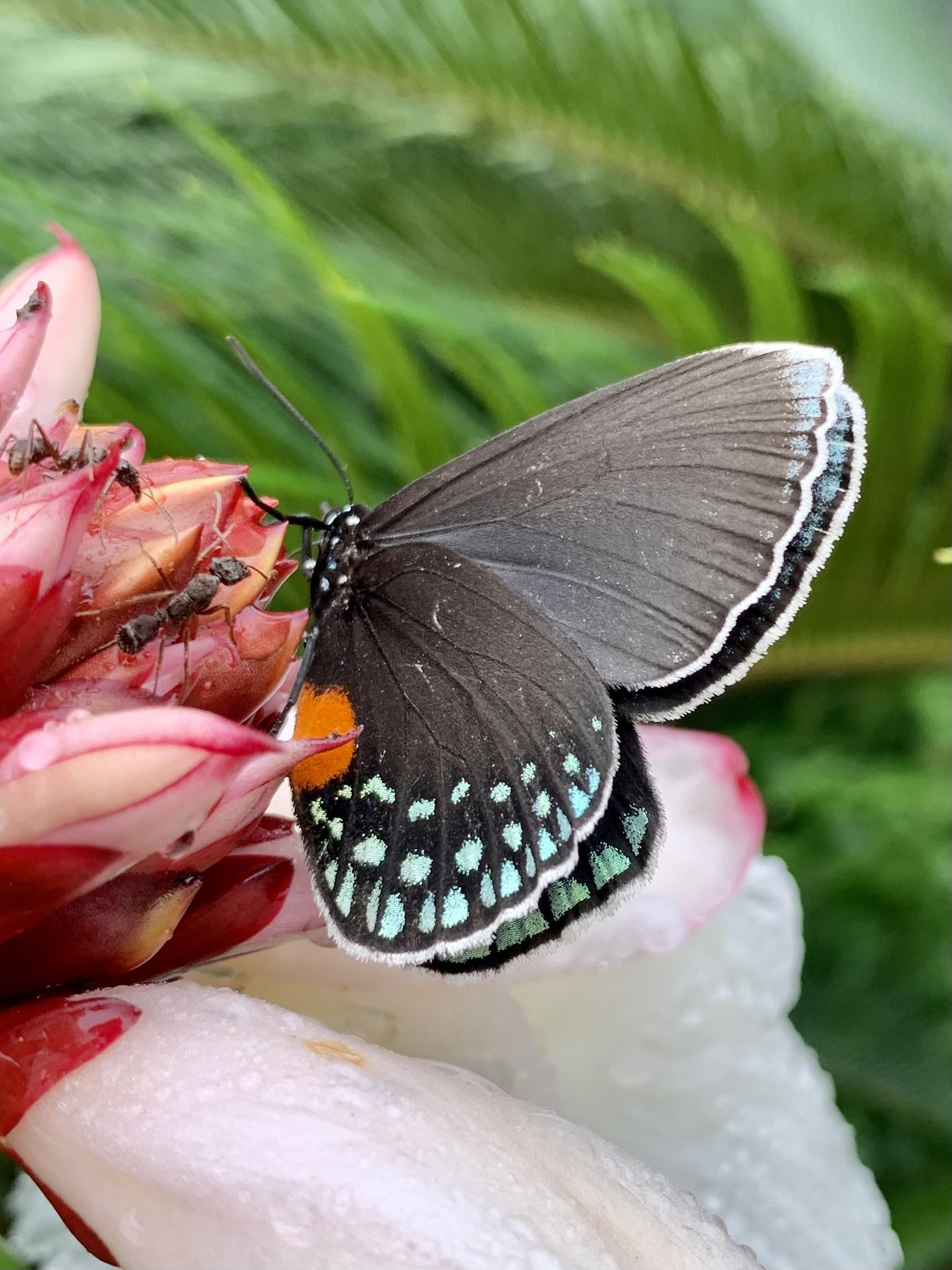

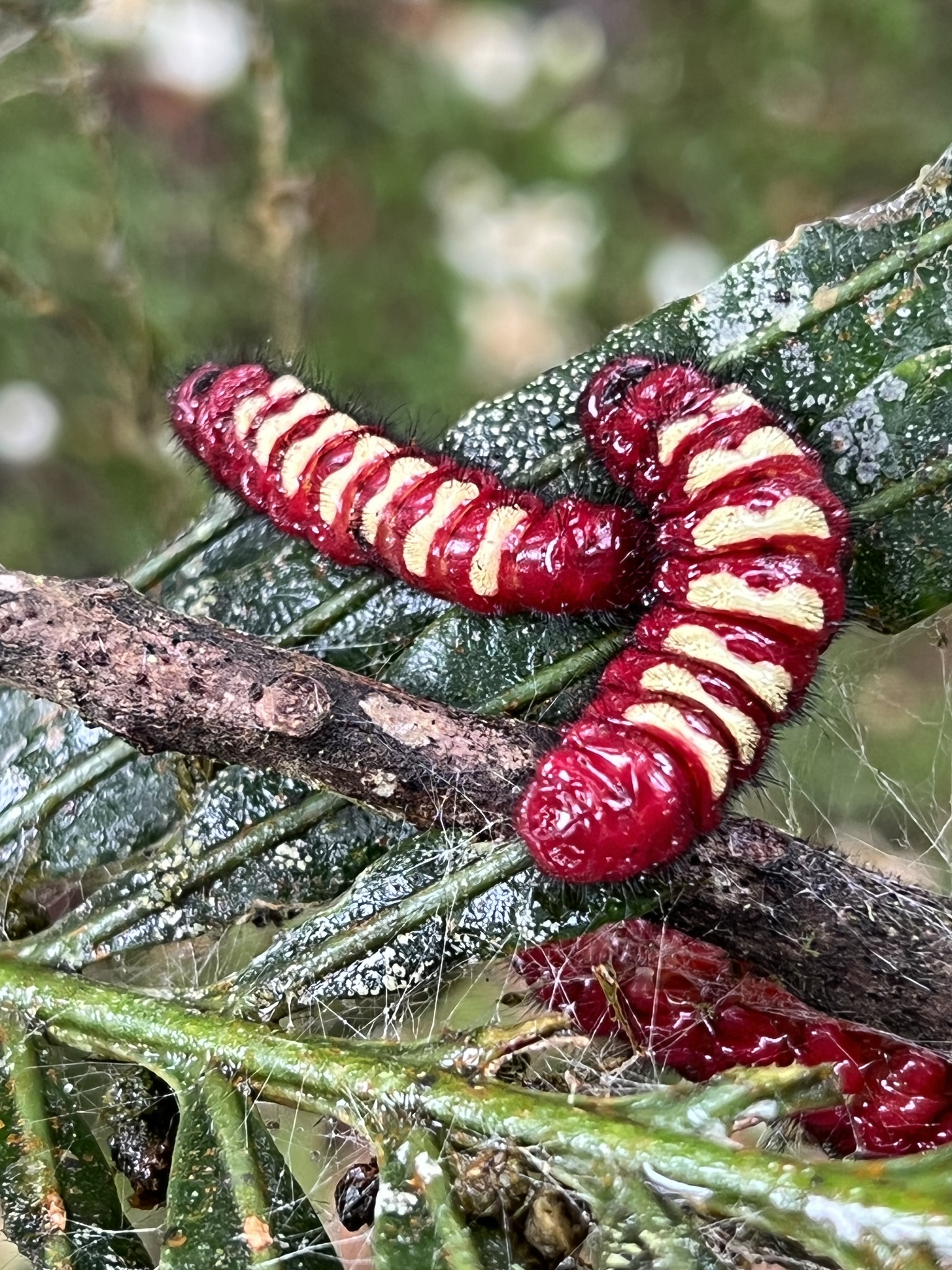
- Adult (top) and larvae (bottom)

Scientific classification
- Domain: Eukaryota
- Kingdom: Animalia
- Phylum: Arthropoda
- Class: Insecta
- Order: Lepidoptera
- Family: Lycaenidae
- Genus: Eumaeus
- Species: E. godartii

Binomial name
- Eumaeus godartii (Boisduval, 1870)

Synonyms
- Eumenia godartii Boisduval, 1870; Eumaeus costaricensis Draudt, 1916

= Eumaeus godartii =

Species of butterfly

Eumaeus godartii, the white-tipped cycadian, is a species of butterfly of the family Lycaenidae. It is found from Nicaragua to western Ecuador.
