= Methyl-ONN-azoxymethanol beta-D-glucosyltransferase =

Class of enzymes

Identifiers
- EC no.: 2.4.1.171
- CAS no.: 99283-65-5

Databases
- IntEnz: IntEnz view
- BRENDA: BRENDA entry
- ExPASy: NiceZyme view
- KEGG: KEGG entry
- MetaCyc: metabolic pathway
- PRIAM: profile
- PDB structures: RCSB PDB PDBe PDBsum
- Gene Ontology: AmiGO / QuickGO
Search
- PMC: articles
- PubMed: articles
- NCBI: proteins

Methyl-ONN-azoxymethanol beta-D-glucosyltransferase (EC 2.4.1.171) is an enzyme that catalyzes the chemical reaction

MAM
+ UDP-glucose
UDP
cycasin

The two substrates of this enzyme characterised from Cycas revoluta are methylazoxymethanol acetate (MAM) and UDP-glucose. Its products are the neurotoxic glucoside, cycasin, and uridine diphosphate (UDP).

This enzyme belongs to the family of glycosyltransferases, specifically the hexosyltransferases. The systematic name of this enzyme class is UDP-glucose:methyl-ONN-azoxymethanol beta-D-glucosyltransferase. Other names in common use include cycasin synthase, uridine diphosphoglucose-methylazoxymethanol glucosyltransferase, and UDP-glucose-methylazoxymethanol glucosyltransferase.
