= Zamia staggers =

Nervous disease affecting cattle

Zamia staggers is a fatal nervous disease affecting cattle, in areas where they browse on the leaves or cones of cycads. It is named after the cycad genus Zamia.

== Etiology ==
The disease is characterised by irreversible paralysis of the hind legs because of the degeneration of the spinal cord. It is caused by the toxins cycasin and macrozamin, β-glycosides (the sugars of which are glucose and primeverose, respectively) of methylazoxymethanol (MAM), and which are found in all cycad genera.

Following ingestion the sugar is removed by bacterial glycosidase in the gut, with the MAM being absorbed. The metabolized toxin produces tumours of the liver, kidney, intestine and brain after a latent period which may be a year or longer. The disease has been known in Australia since the 1860s and was the subject of a Queensland Government investigation during the 1890s.

== See also ==
- beta-Methylamino-L-alanine
- Methyl-ONN-azoxymethanol beta-D-glucosyltransferase
