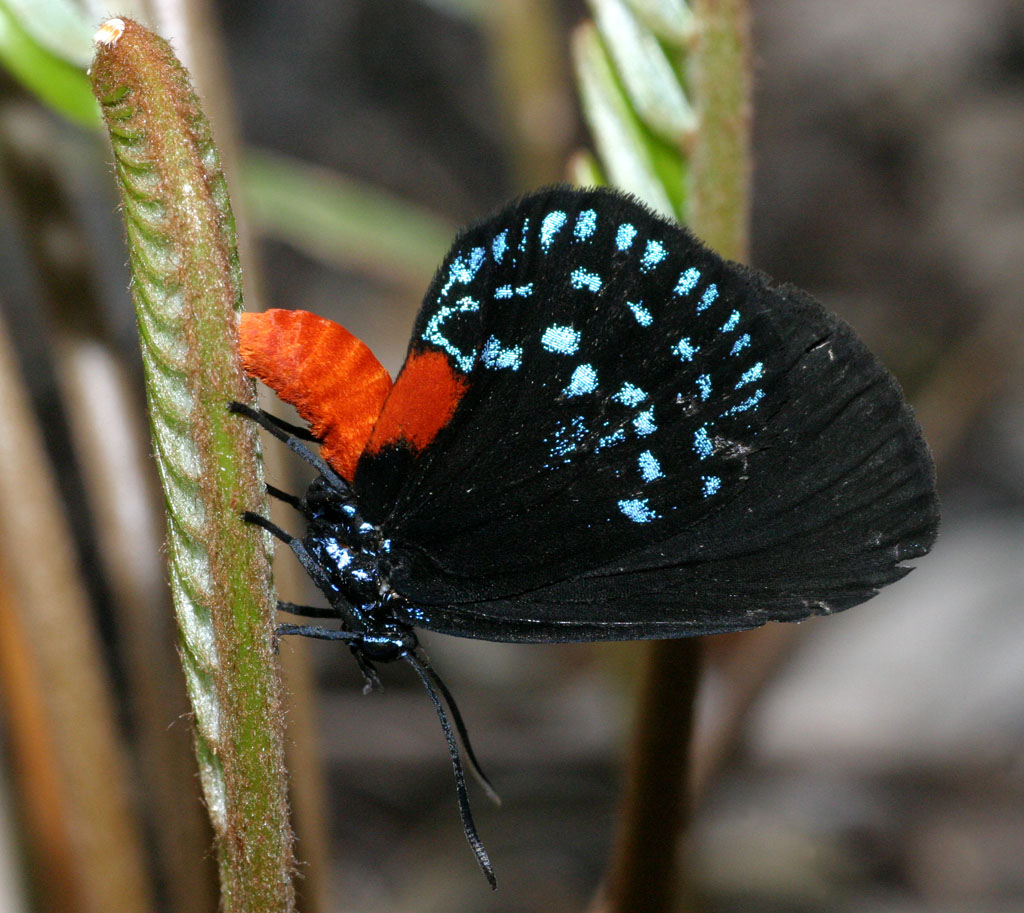
- Female, ovipositing.

Conservation status
- Apparently Secure (NatureServe)

Scientific classification
- Kingdom: Animalia
- Phylum: Arthropoda
- Clade: Pancrustacea
- Class: Insecta
- Order: Lepidoptera
- Family: Lycaenidae
- Genus: Eumaeus
- Species: E. atala

Binomial name
- Eumaeus atala (Poey, 1832)
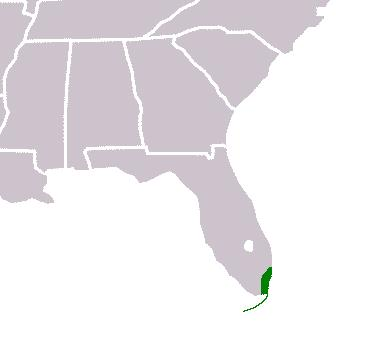
- Range in Florida (note: missing distribution in the Bahamas and Cuba)

= Eumaeus atala =

Species of butterfly

Eumaeus atala, also known as the Atala butterfly or coontie hairstreak, is a small colorful butterfly in the family Lycaenidae. It is found in southeastern Florida (including the Florida Keys) in the United States, Cuba, the Bahamas, and the Cayman Islands in the West Indies. Its coloration and habits are unique among butterflies within its range.

== History ==
The species was first described by the Cuban zoologist Felipe Poey. He named the butterfly for Atala, the Native American heroine of an 1801 French novella (Atala, ou Les Amours de deux sauvages dans le desert or in English: "Atala, or the Loves of two Indian savages in the desert") of the same name that was written by Chateaubriand.

== Ecology ==
Throughout its range, the larvae feed on a native cycad, Zamia integrifolia (commonly called "coontie palm" or "arrowhead"), as well as Zamia pumila and other exotic ornamental cycads. In Cuba, the introduced cycad Cycas revoluta also is eaten by this species.

Adult butterflies take flower nectar and sometimes roost in trees. Adults fly through much of the year. The natural habitat is open brushy areas and tropical hammocks, often in pine woodlands. Many populations now exist in suburban areas containing ornamental cycads. Males keep close to a site with host plants, often forming small colonies of a few individuals. The females, however, may disperse in search of more hosts. The larvae of Eumaeus atala feed exclusively on coontie (Zamia integrifolia) leaves, from which they sequester toxic cycasin compounds that make both the caterpillars and adult butterflies distasteful to predators.

Egg

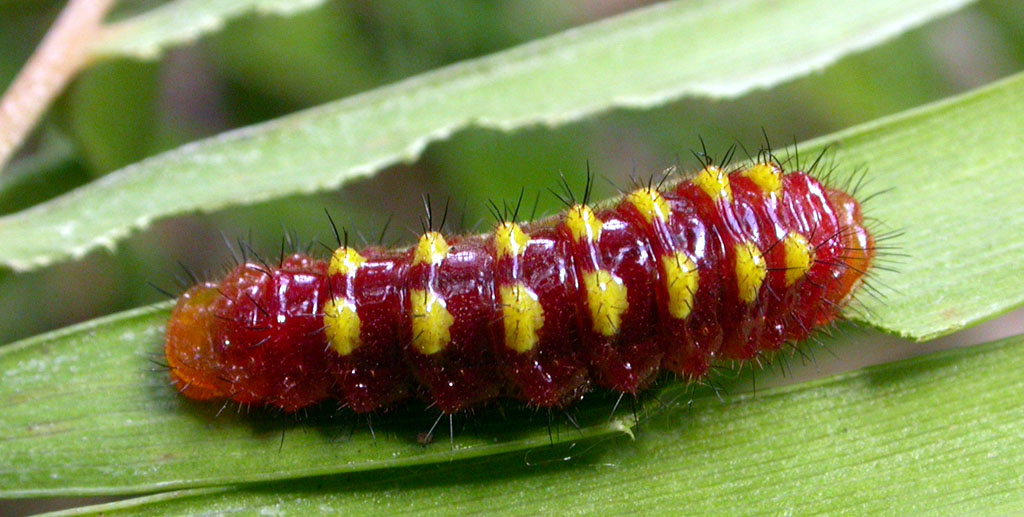
Larva

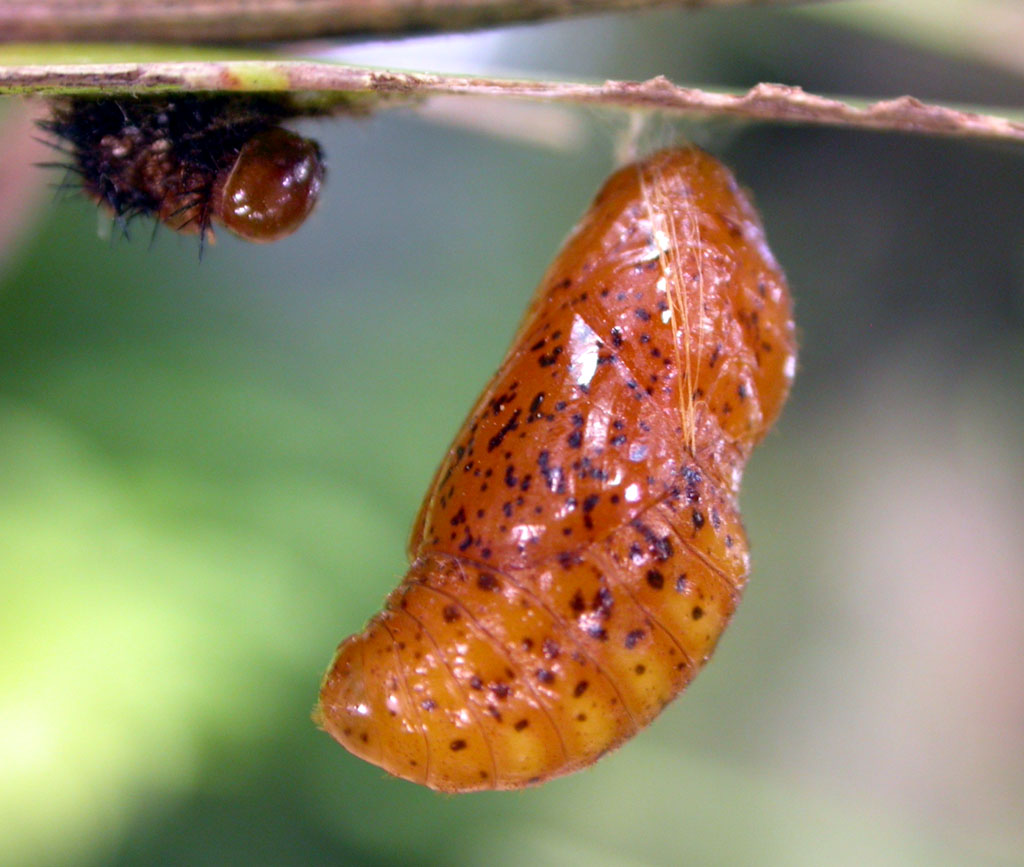
Pupa

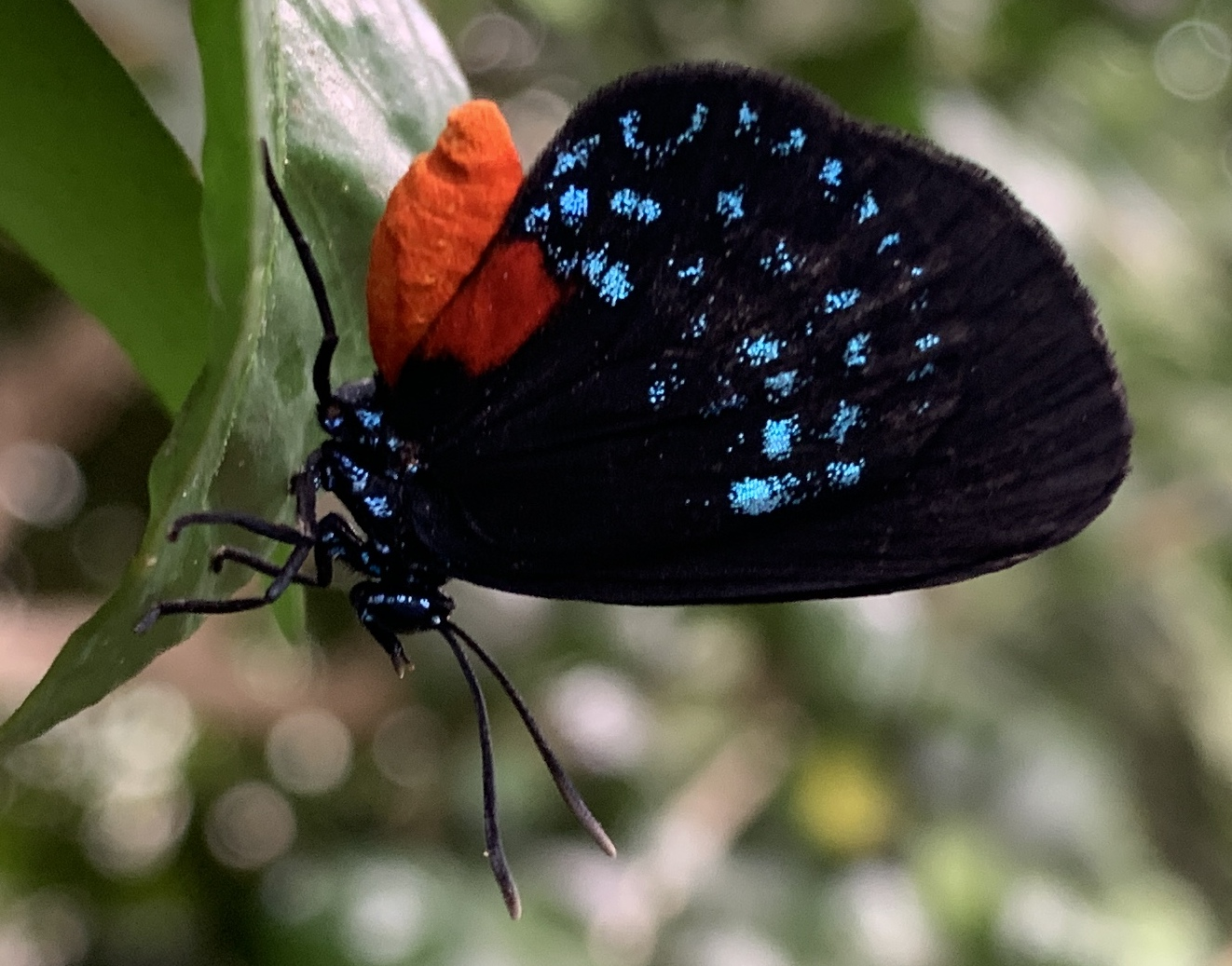
Adult

== Description ==
A group of larvae feed on a coontie leaf

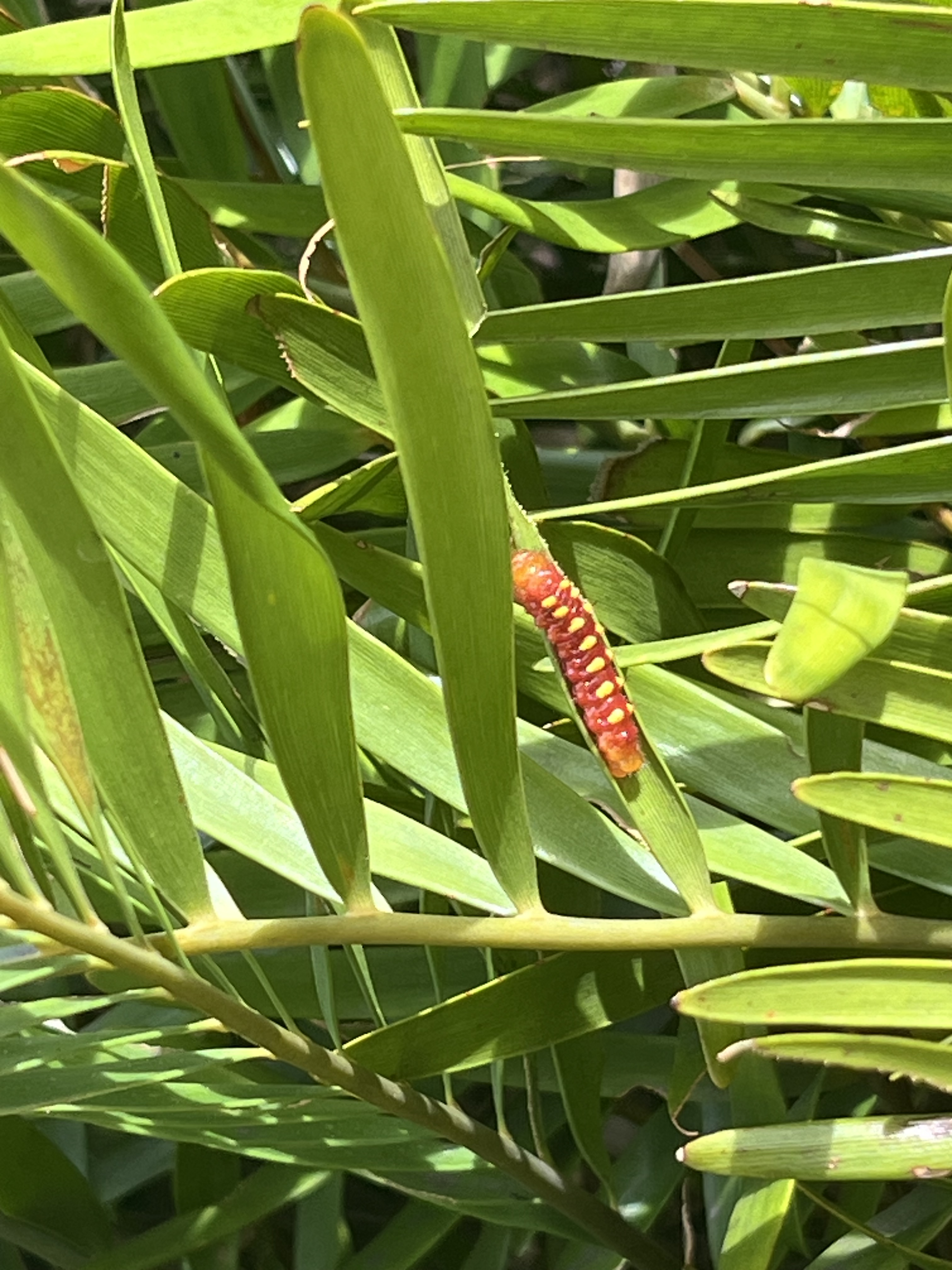
The striking red caterpillar of the Atala butterfly

The Atala butterfly is a great example of aposematic (warning) coloration throughout its life cycle. The brightly colored larva or caterpillar feeds on cycads that contain a toxic secondary plant chemical (cycasin) that it retains in its body for life. Birds, lizards, and other animals may attempt to prey on the larvae, pupae, and adults, but find them distasteful and learn to avoid these brightly patterned insects.

The butterfly's flight is slow, unlike the swift, erratic flight of many other Lycaenidae.

== Breeding ==
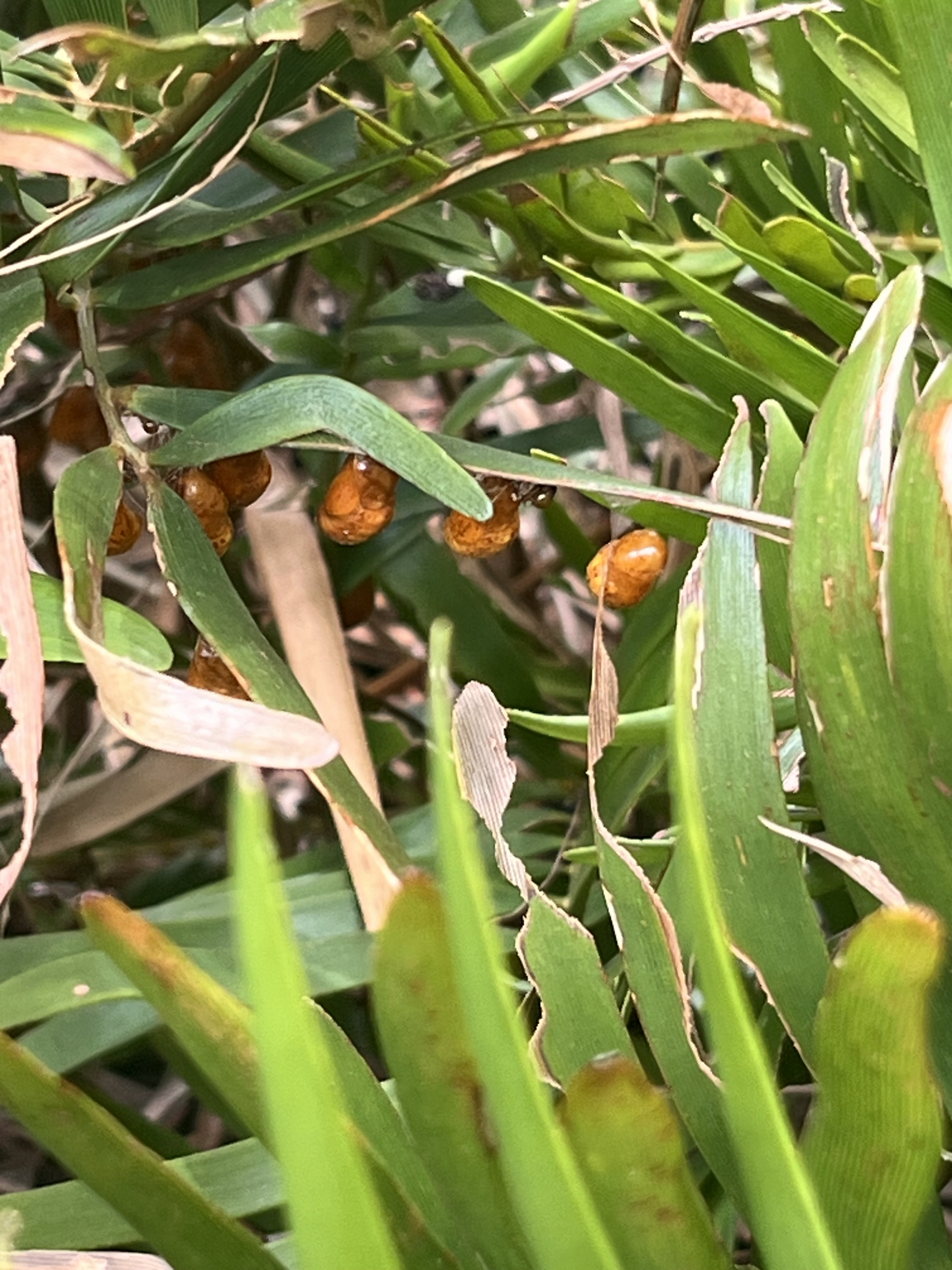
Atala butterfly chrysalises hang from a coontie palm.

Like many Lepidoptera, male atalas have hair-pencils (coremata) on their abdomens used in courtship; the male hovers in front of the female, wafting pheromones exuded from the pencils in her direction. Eggs are laid in clusters of 10-50 on the leaf tips of the host plant. Larvae feed on the leaves. Pupation is usually completed on the host plant.

== Conservation ==
The United States population of Eumaeus atala was originally restricted to pine rocklands and the edges of tropical hardwood hammocks in southeastern Florida. The severe reduction of populations of its host, coontie (Zamia integrifolia), and the loss of rockland and hammocks to development led to the near disappearance of the butterfly in the mid-1930s. While occasional specimens were found into the mid-1960s, the atala was believed to be extirpated in Florida after the 1960s, and was therefore not listed under the U.S. Endangered Species Act of 1973. A colony of atala butterflies was discovered on Virginia Key in 1979, and a private network of butterfly enthusiasts began introducing caterpillers to populations of coontie, including in areas well outside of the butterfly's original range. The Atala butterfly is now common locally in southeast Florida, having rebounded to the extent of being sometimes considered a pest for eating coontie and other ornamental cycads. Recent reports include colonies in Brevard County and sightings in Pinellas County, Gainesville, and Tallahassee.
