= Zamia cremnophila =

Conservation status
- Endangered (IUCN 3.1)

Scientific classification
- Kingdom: Plantae
- Clade: Tracheophytes
- Clade: Gymnospermae
- Division: Cycadophyta
- Class: Cycadopsida
- Order: Cycadales
- Family: Zamiaceae
- Genus: Zamia
- Species: Z. cremnophila

Binomial name
- Zamia cremnophila Vovides, Schutzman & Dehgan

Species of cycad

Zamia cremnophila is a species of plant in the family Zamiaceae. It is endemic to the state of Tabasco in Mexico.

== Discovery, etymology, and relationships ==
Zamia cremnophila was found in Tabasco state in Mexico in 1981, growing on rocky cliff sides of calcareous hills. The species epithet was accordingly taken from cremnos, Greek for cliff, to reflect that growth habit. It appears to be closely related to other Zamias in southern Mexico, including Z. purpurea and Z. splendens.

== Description ==
Zamia cremnophila has a thick stem, growing primarily underground, which is 10 to 25 centimetres (3.9 to 9.8 in) long or longer and 3 to 9 centimetres (1.2 to 3.5 in) in diameter. There are a variable number of drooping compound-leaves, 0.45 to 2.0 metres (1 ft 6 in to 6 ft 7 in) long and 41 to 72 centimetres (16 to 28 in) wide. There are up to 15 to 25 pairs of leaflets on a leaf. Leaflets are long-lanceolate to oblong, emerging a deep purplish-red and turning green as they mature. Leaflets are 10 to 36 centimetres (3.9 to 14.2 in) long, 2 to 4 centimetres (0.79 to 1.57 in) wide, and joined to the rachis (central shaft of the leaf) by a 0.8 to 1.2 centimetres (0.31 to 0.47 in) long stalk. The petiole (leaf stalk) is 0.5 to 4 centimetres (0.20 to 1.57 in) long. Both the petiole and rachis are covered with spines.

Like all cycads, Zamia cremnophila is dioecious, with individual plants being either male or female. Male strobili (cones) are cylindrical to conical, 2.5 centimetres (0.98 in) long and 0.8 centimetres (0.31 in) in diameter. They are brown and stand on a hairy peduncle (stalk). Female strobili (cones) are cylindrical to barrel-shaped, 8.5 centimetres (3.3 in) long and 5.5 centimetres (2.2 in) in diameter. They are deep brown in color and covered with hairs. Seeds are ovoid in shape, 1.5 to 1.7 centimetres (0.59 to 0.67 in) long and 0.9 to 1.0 centimetre (0.35 to 0.39 in) in diameter. The sarcotesta (seed coat) is white when immature, turning bright scarlet with maturity.

== Sources ==
- Schutzman, B.; Vovides, A. P.; Dehgan, B. (1988). "Two new species of Zamia (Zamiaceae, Cycadales) from southern Mexico" (PDF). Botanical Gazette. 149 (3): 347–360. doi:10.1086/337725.
- Nicolalde-Morejón, Fernando; Vovides, Andrew P.; Stevenson, Dennis W. (9 December 2009). "Taxonomic revision of Zamia in Mega-Mexico". Brittonia. 61 (4): 301–335. doi:10.1007/s12228-009-9077-9. ISSN 0007-196X.
