= Cycasin =

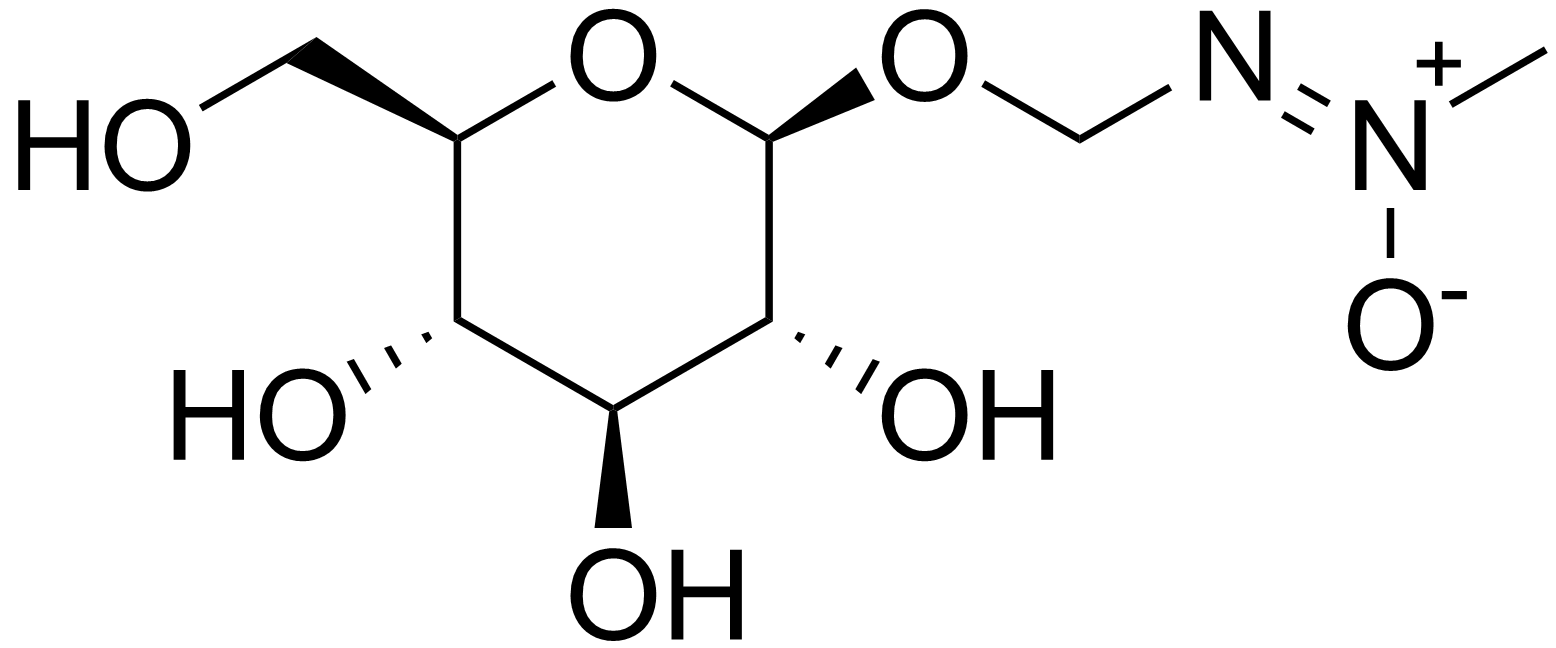

Names
- IUPAC name (Z)-1-[(β-D-Glucopyranosyloxy)methyl]-2-methyldiazene 2-oxide
- Systematic IUPAC name (Z)-1-Methyl-2-({[(2S,3R,4S,5S,6R)-3,4,5-trihydroxy-6-(hydroxymethyl)oxan-2-yl]oxy}methyl)diazene 1-oxide
- Other names β-D-Glucosyloxyazoxymethane; Methylazoxymethanol β-D-glucoside; Cycas revoluta glucoside; [(Z)-Methyl-ONN-azoxy]methyl β-D-glucopyranoside

Identifiers
CAS Number	14901-08-7
3D model (JSmol)	Interactive image
ChEBI	CHEBI:17074
ChemSpider	4573631
KEGG	C01418
MeSH	D003492
PubChem CID	5459896
UNII	9H51HL0E1D
CompTox Dashboard (EPA)	DTXSID2057574
- InChI: InChI=1S/C8H16N2O7/c1-10(15)9-3-16-8-7(14)6(13)5(12)4(2-11)17-8/h4-8,11-14H,2-3H2,1H3/b10-9-/t4-,5-,6+,7-,8-/m1/s1 Key: YHLRMABUJXBLCK-LBCXAKKBSA-N; InChI=1/C8H16N2O7/c1-10(15)9-3-16-8-7(14)6(13)5(12)4(2-11)17-8/h4-8,11-14H,2-3H2,1H3/b10-9-/t4-,5-,6+,7-,8-/m1/s1 Key: YHLRMABUJXBLCK-LBCXAKKBSA
- SMILES: [O-]/[N+](=N/CO[C@@H]1O[C@@H]([C@@H](O)[C@H](O)[C@H]1O)CO)C

Properties
Chemical formula	C_{8}H_{16}N_{2}O_{7}
Molar mass	252.223 g·mol^{−1}
Solubility in water	56.6 g/L
- Except where otherwise noted, data are given for materials in their standard state (at 25 °C [77 °F], 100 kPa). Infobox references

Cycasin is a carcinogenic and neurotoxic glucoside found in cycads such as Cycas revoluta and Zamia pumila. Symptoms of poisoning include vomiting, diarrhea, weakness, seizures, and hepatotoxicity. In metabolic conditions, cycasin is hydrolyzed into glucose and methylazoxymethanol (MAM), the latter of which dissociates into formaldehyde and diazomethane.

It induces hepatotoxicity and Zamia staggers, a fatal nervous disease affecting cattle resulting from browsing on the leaves or other parts of cycads.

== Sources ==
Cycasin is found in all known cycad genera and is distributed throughout the body of the plant, but with the highest concentration in the seeds. It is one of several toxins found in cycad plants, along with the neurotoxic amino acid BMAA. The origin and biological role of these toxins is unknown, as there does not appear to be a statistically significant correlation between the concentration of toxic material and the types of herbivory observed in animals consuming the plants.

The enzyme methyl-ONN-azoxymethanol beta-D-glucosyltransferase uses the two substrates UDP-glucose and methyl-ONN-azoxymethanol to produce UDP and cycasin.

=== Ecological significance ===
The butterfly Eumaeus atala, whose larvae feed on Z. pumila, contain the poison as a consequence of their diet.

=== Presence in sago ===
In order to produce sago, cycasin and other cycad toxins must be removed from the flesh of the plants. The flesh, seeds, and roots of the cycad are first dried and ground into a fine powder, before being submerged in boiling water. The water is then allowed to drain, leaching out the toxic material while leaving the starch behind. The extracted starch is then alternately dried and pounded until a fine powder is obtained. This repeated pounding and leaching process ensures that there is as little cycasin as possible left behind.

== Structure ==
Cycasin is a glucose-derived glycoside with a methylazoxymethanol substitution at the beta position.

Stereochemistry at the azoxy group is (Z) (or trans (E) when oxygen removed formally to form azo- group).

== Toxicity ==
Methylazoxymethanol (MAM)

Cycasin has an oral LD_{50} of 500 mg/kg. Exposure to cycasin by injection does not cause any permanent ill effects. As a consequence, consumption is not immediately lethal, but will cause a host of liver and neurological problems, as well as causing cancer with long-term exposure. The mechanism of cycasin's toxicity relies on β-glucosidase enzymes found in the gut. Treatment with β-glucosidase causes cycasin to release methylazoxymethanol (MAM), which spontaneously decomposes to form formaldehyde and methyldiazonium. The amount of formaldehyde released is too small to induce toxicity, but methyldiazonium is a potent methylating agent. The presence of this molecule methylates DNA, causing long-term damage and potentially giving rise to cancers.

=== Symptoms ===
Early symptoms of cycasin poisoning are vomiting, nausea, abdominal pain, and diarrhea. Later stages of poisoning manifest as liver dysfunctions.

=== Zamia staggers ===
Livestock that consume raw leaves, nuts, and flour of cycads develop a neurologic syndrome known as zamia staggers, named for the cycad genus Zamia native to Central and South America. It is clinically characterized by weight loss followed by lateral swaying of the hind quarters, with weakness, ataxia, and proprioceptive defects in the rear limbs, and results in demyelination and axonal degeneration in the brain, spinal cord, and dorsal root ganglia.

=== Suspected association with Lytico-bodig disease ===
The Lytico-bodig disease, also known as lateral sclerosis-parkinsonism-dementia, is a neurodegenerative disease of unknown origin that occurs exclusively in the Chamorro people of the island of Guam that has characteristics of both amyotrophic lateral sclerosis (ALS) and parkinsonism. It is characterized by muscle atrophy, maxillofacial paralysis, inability to speak or swallow, and dementia. The disease is fatal in all cases, with the diaphragm and respiratory accessory muscles becoming paralyzed in the later stages of the disease.

Observation of the diets of the native Chamorro people led to the creation of the so-called "Cycad hypothesis." Starches prepared from the seeds of a native cycad species, Cycas micronesica, are used to create the sago-like flour fadang, which forms a major part of the diet of the Chamorro people. As the seeds contain the highest amount of the toxin found in the plant, it was proposed that a dietary explanation relating to the consumption of poorly processed fadang was poisoning the natives. After failing to reproduce the symptoms of the disease in animal models, the hypothesis was rejected. Though the initial cycad hypothesis was rejected, a revised form of the hypothesis was proposed by Paul Alan Cox and Oliver Sacks after observing other elements of the Chamorro diet, specifically flying foxes. The bats accumulate BMAA in their fat by consuming cycad seeds, resulting a in a high concentration of the neurotoxin.

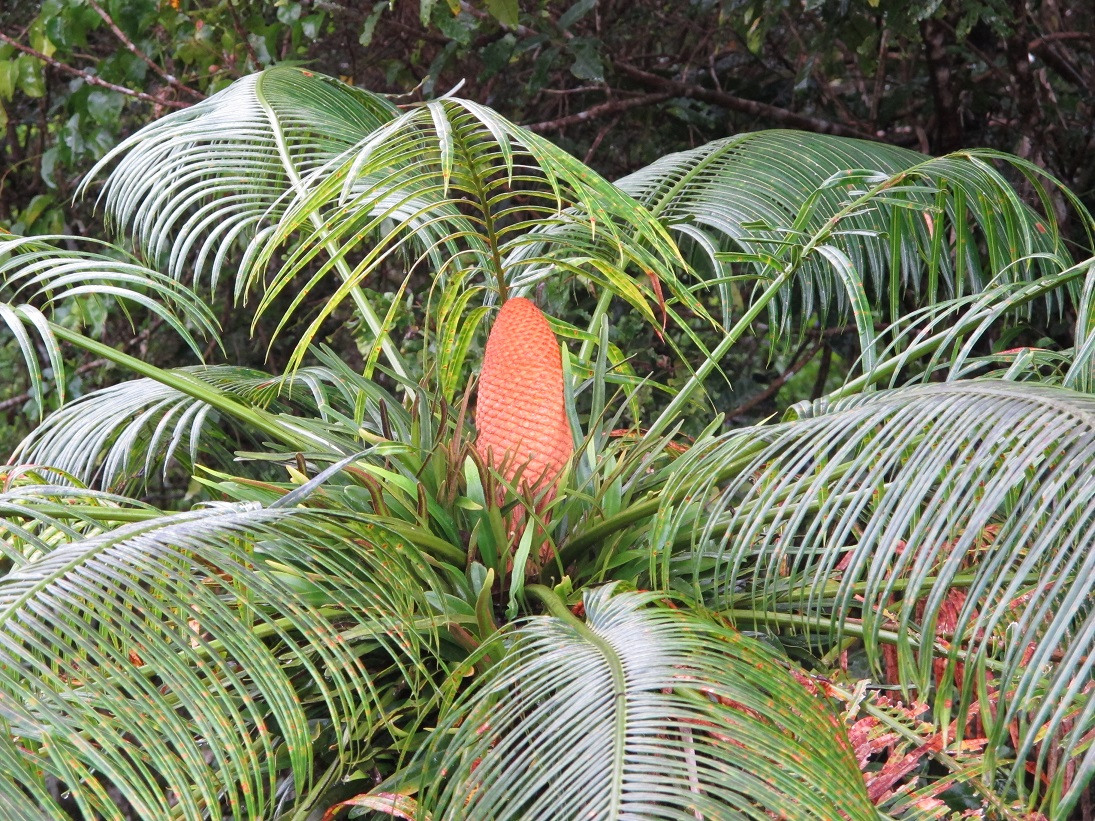
Cycas micronesica, one of the cycad species consumed by the Chamorro

== See also ==
- List of IARC Group 2B carcinogens
- List of MeSH codes (D02)
