= Zamia grijalvensis =

Conservation status
- Critically Endangered (IUCN 3.1)

Scientific classification
- Kingdom: Plantae
- Clade: Embryophytes
- Clade: Tracheophytes
- Clade: Spermatophytes
- Clade: Gymnospermae
- Division: Cycadophyta
- Class: Cycadopsida
- Order: Cycadales
- Family: Zamiaceae
- Genus: Zamia
- Species: Z. grijalvensis

Binomial name
- Zamia grijalvensis Pérez-Farr., Vovides & Mart.-Camilo

Species of cycad

Zamia grijalvensis is a species of cycad in the family Zamiaceae.
