= Methylazoxymethanol =

Names
- IUPAC name (Z)-hydroxymethylimino-methyl-oxidoazanium
- Preferred IUPAC name [(Z)-methyl-ONN-azoxy]methanol
- Other names MAM

Identifiers
CAS Number	590-96-5
3D model (JSmol)	Interactive image
ChEBI	CHEBI:29323
ChemSpider	16453402
KEGG	C02390
PubChem CID	6433205
UNII	JGG19N3YDQ
CompTox Dashboard (EPA)	DTXSID1035076
- InChI: InChI=1S/C2H6N2O2/c1-4(6)3-2-5/h5H,2H2,1H3/b4-3- Key: BJNBRIBHKLJMAG-ARJAWSKDSA-N
- SMILES: C[N+](=NCO)[O-]

Properties
Chemical formula	C_{2}H_{6}N_{2}O_{2}
Molar mass	90.082
- Except where otherwise noted, data are given for materials in their standard state (at 25 °C [77 °F], 100 kPa). Infobox references

Methylazoxymethanol, MAM, is a carcinogen which reduces DNA synthesis. Its derivatives include methylazoxymethanol acetate and cycasin, which they are found in cycad.
