= Zamia lacandona =

Conservation status
- Endangered (IUCN 3.1)

Scientific classification
- Kingdom: Plantae
- Clade: Embryophytes
- Clade: Tracheophytes
- Clade: Gymnosperms
- Division: Cycadophyta
- Class: Cycadopsida
- Order: Cycadales
- Family: Zamiaceae
- Genus: Zamia
- Species: Z. lacandona

Binomial name
- Zamia lacandona Schutzman & Vovides

Species of cycad

Zamia lacandona is a species of plant in the family Zamiaceae. It is endemic to Mexico, where it occurs only in the state of Chiapas, near Palenque and Agua Azul.

This plant grows 15 to 60 centimeters tall from an underground caudex. It usually produces a single leaf up to 100 centimeters long by 80 wide. The leaf has up to 12 pairs of leaflets. The species is named for its native rainforest habitat, the Lacandon Jungle, the Selva Lacandona.

This species is threatened by slash-and-burn agriculture. It can sometimes regenerate in degraded habitat that has been burned and cleared, and can be seen growing in agricultural fields and on roadsides.

== Sources ==
- Nicolalde-Morejón, Fernando; Vovides, Andrew P.; Stevenson, Dennis W. (9 December 2009). "Taxonomic revision of Zamia in Mega-Mexico". Brittonia. 61 (4): 301–335. doi:10.1007/s12228-009-9077-9. ISSN 0007-196X.
