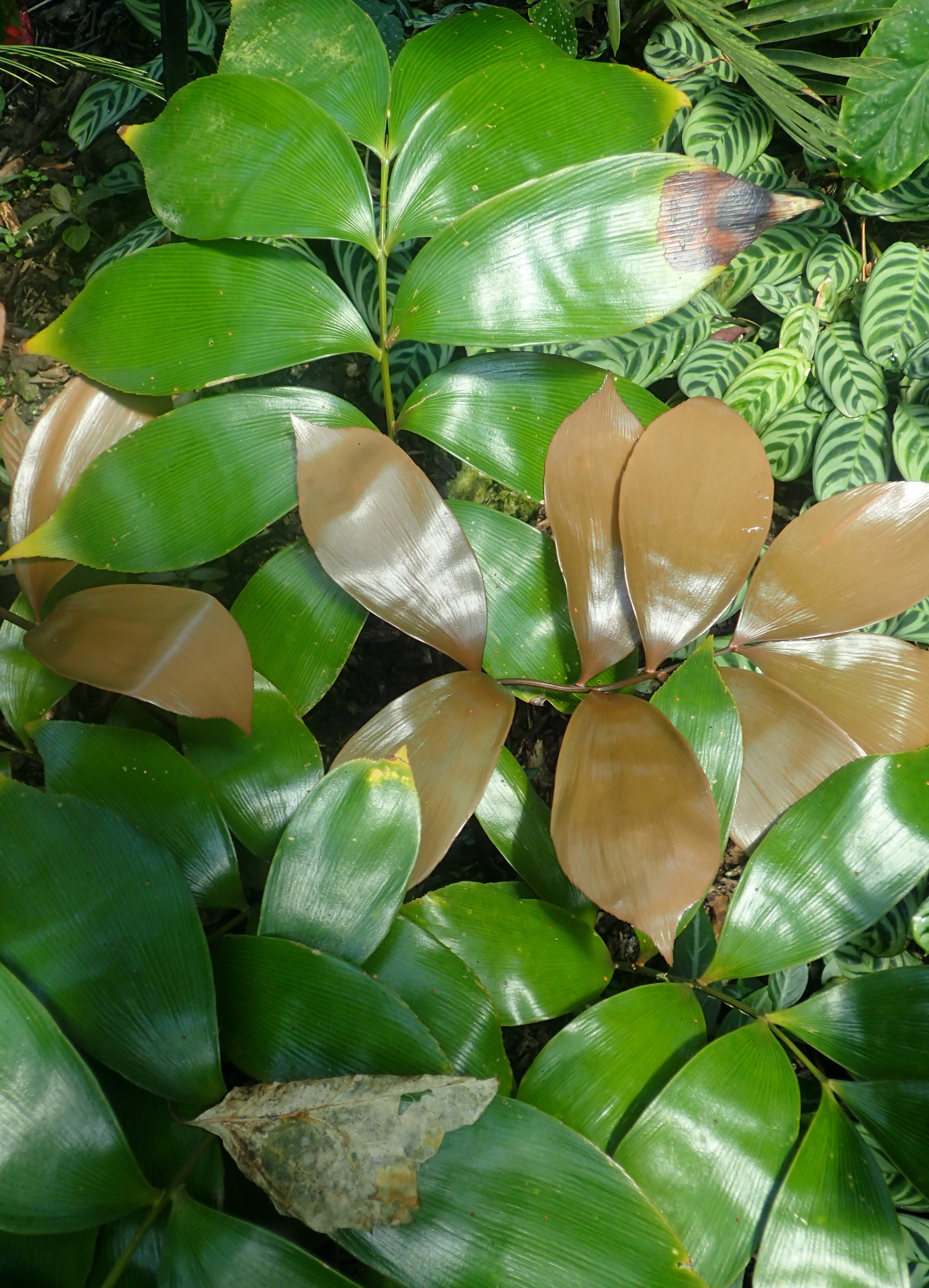

Conservation status
- Critically Endangered (IUCN 3.1)

Scientific classification
- Kingdom: Plantae
- Clade: Tracheophytes
- Clade: Gymnospermae
- Division: Cycadophyta
- Class: Cycadopsida
- Order: Cycadales
- Family: Zamiaceae
- Genus: Zamia
- Species: Z. purpurea

Binomial name
- Zamia purpurea Vovides, J.D.Rees & Vázq.Torres

= Zamia purpurea =

Species of cycad

Zamia purpurea is a species of plant in the family Zamiaceae. It is endemic to Mexico, where it occurs only in the states of Oaxaca and Veracruz. It grows in the understory of rainforests. It is affected by habitat destruction.

== Sources ==
- Nicolalde-Morejón, Fernando; Vovides, Andrew P.; Stevenson, Dennis W. (9 December 2009). "Taxonomic revision of Zamia in Mega-Mexico". Brittonia. 61 (4): 301–335. doi:10.1007/s12228-009-9077-9. ISSN 0007-196X.
