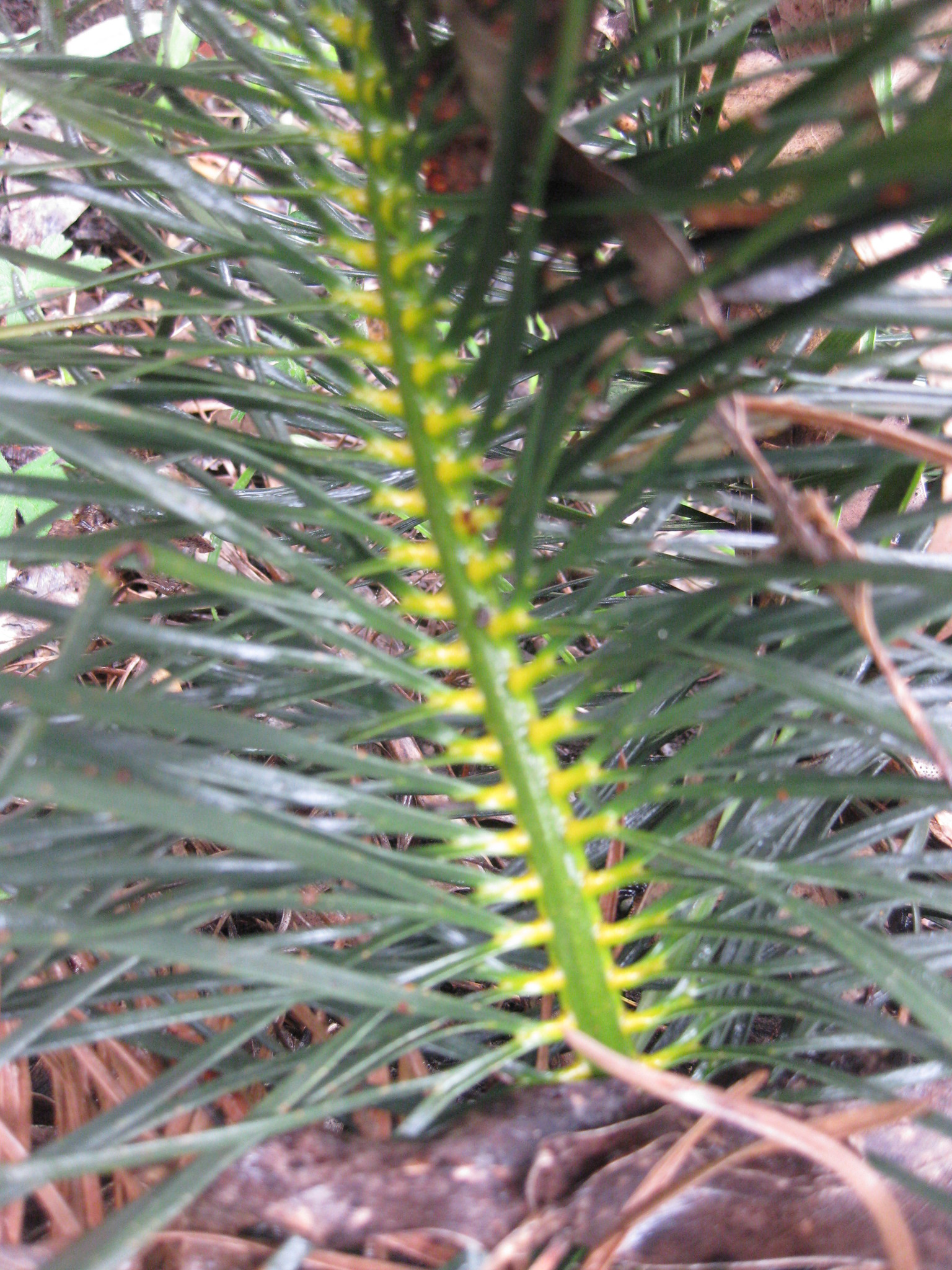

Conservation status
- Near Threatened (IUCN 3.1)

Scientific classification
- Kingdom: Plantae
- Clade: Tracheophytes
- Clade: Gymnospermae
- Division: Cycadophyta
- Class: Cycadopsida
- Order: Cycadales
- Family: Zamiaceae
- Genus: Macrozamia
- Species: M. stenomera

Binomial name
- Macrozamia stenomera L.A.S.Johnson
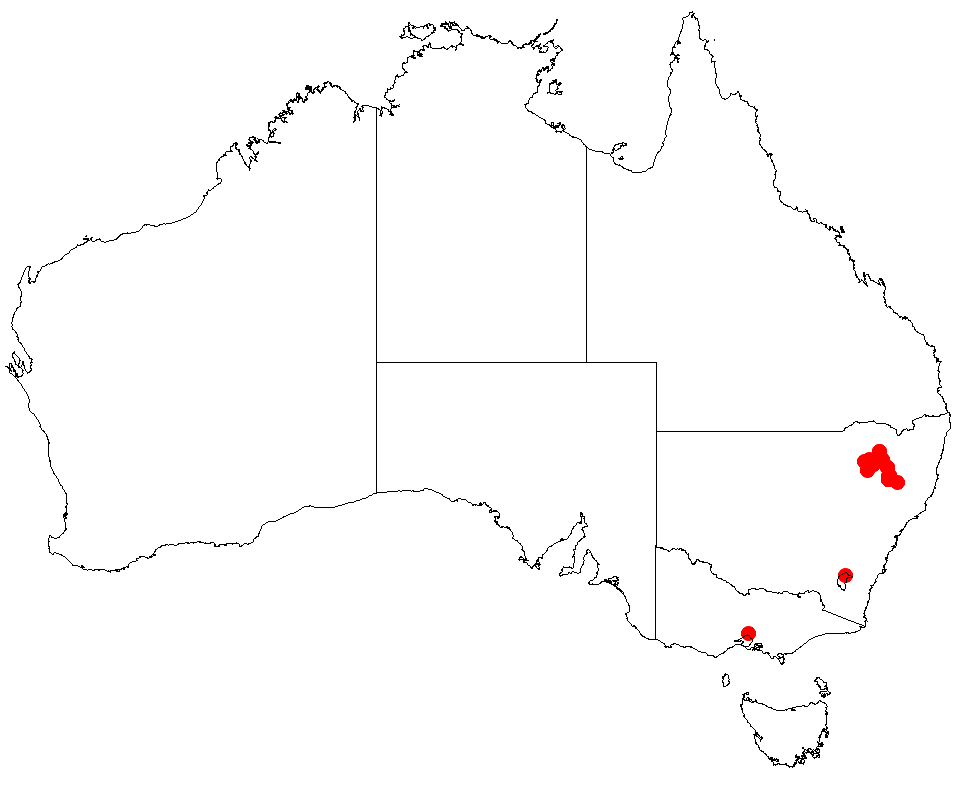
- Occurrence data from AVH

= Macrozamia stenomera =

Species of cycad

Macrozamia stenomera is a species of plant in the family Zamiaceae. It is endemic to New South Wales, Australia.
