= Methylazoxymethanol acetate =

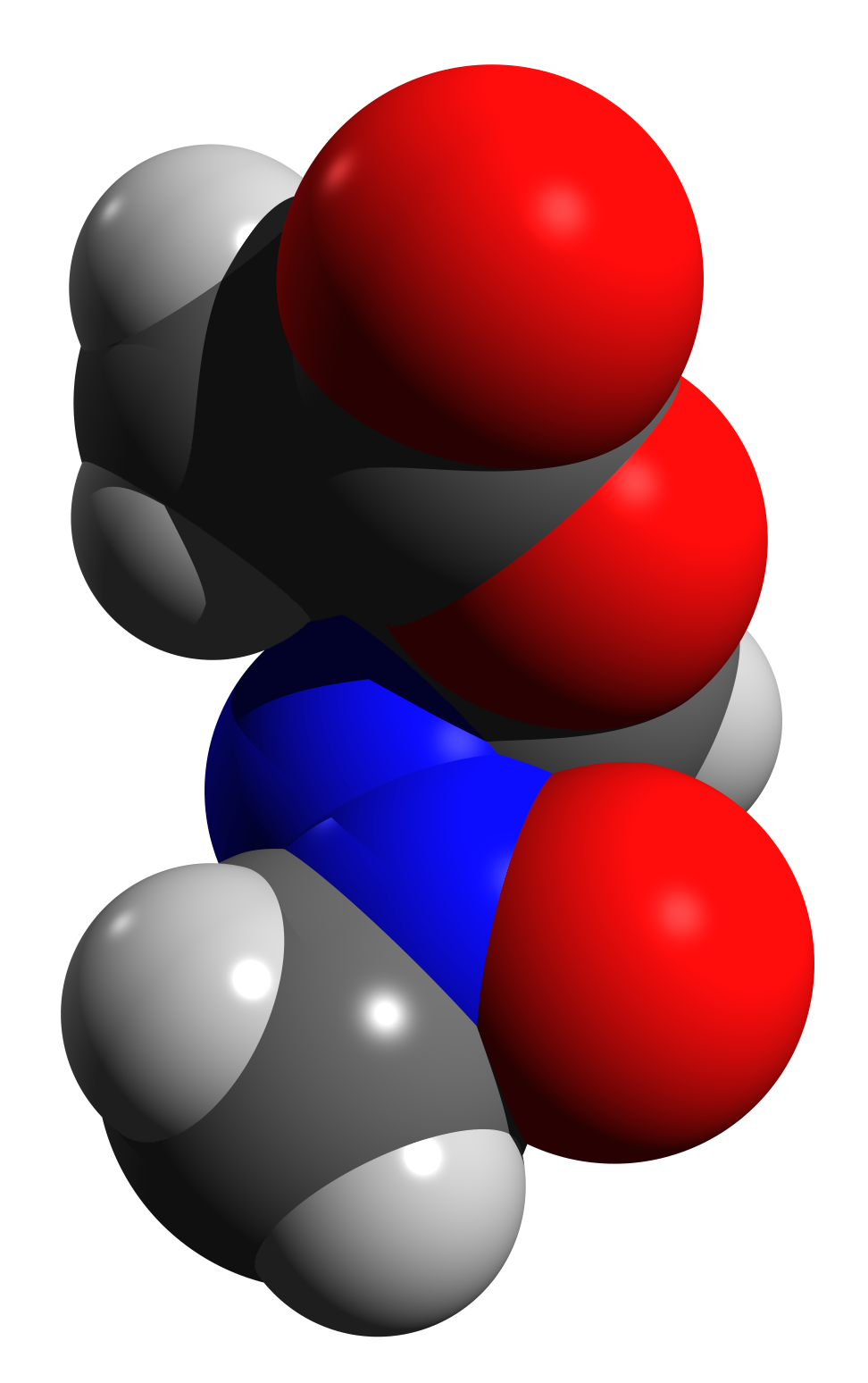

Names
- IUPAC name (Z)-acetyloxymethylimino-methyl-oxidoazanium
- Preferred IUPAC name [(Z)-methyl-ONN-azoxy]methyl acetate
- Other names MAM

Identifiers
CAS Number	592-62-1
3D model (JSmol)	Interactive image
ChEBI	CHEBI:82341
ChemSpider	19953632
ECHA InfoCard	100.008.879
EC Number	209-765-7
KEGG	C19258
MeSH	D008746
PubChem CID	5363199
UNII	4C7R36N7Q7
CompTox Dashboard (EPA)	DTXSID1025568
- InChI: InChI=1S/C4H8N2O3/c1-4(7)9-3-5-6(2)8/h3H2,1-2H3/b6-5- Key: BELPJCDYWUCHKF-WAYWQWQTSA-N; InChI=1/C4H8N2O3/c1-4(7)9-3-5-6(2)8/h3H2,1-2H3/b6-5- Key: BELPJCDYWUCHKF-WAYWQWQTBQ
- SMILES: CC(=O)OC/N=[N+](/C)\[O-]

Properties
Chemical formula	C_{4}H_{8}N_{2}O_{3}
Molar mass	132.11792

Hazards
- GHS labelling
Pictograms	(GHS08: Health hazard)
Signal word	Danger
Hazard statements	H350, H360D
Precautionary statements	P201, P202, P281, P308+P313, P405, P501
- Except where otherwise noted, data are given for materials in their standard state (at 25 °C [77 °F], 100 kPa). Infobox references

Methylazoxymethanol acetate, MAM, is a neurotoxin which reduces DNA synthesis used in making animal models of neurological diseases including schizophrenia and epilepsy. MAM is found in cycad seeds, and causes zamia staggers. It selectively targets neuroblasts in the central nervous system. In rats, administration of MAM affects structures in the brain which are developing most quickly. It is an acetate of methylazoxymethanol.

== MAM animal models ==
=== Schizophrenia ===
In rat models, the specific effect of MAM on neural development depends on the gestational age of the subject. At the seventeenth gestational day (GD17), administration of MAM produces behavioral and histopathological patterns found in schizophrenia. The molecular mechanism behind this model is not fully known. Methylazoxymethanol acetate administered at GD17 reduces the thickness of the hippocampus and the thalamus. The locomotor effects of amphetamines and the spontaneous firing rate of dopaminergic neurons in the ventral tegmental area are increased. In alternating maze tests, GD17 MAM rats quickly learned the first rule, but took longer to accommodate to alterations to the rule; this is thought to indicate deficits in working spatial memory, which is also impaired in schizophrenia.
