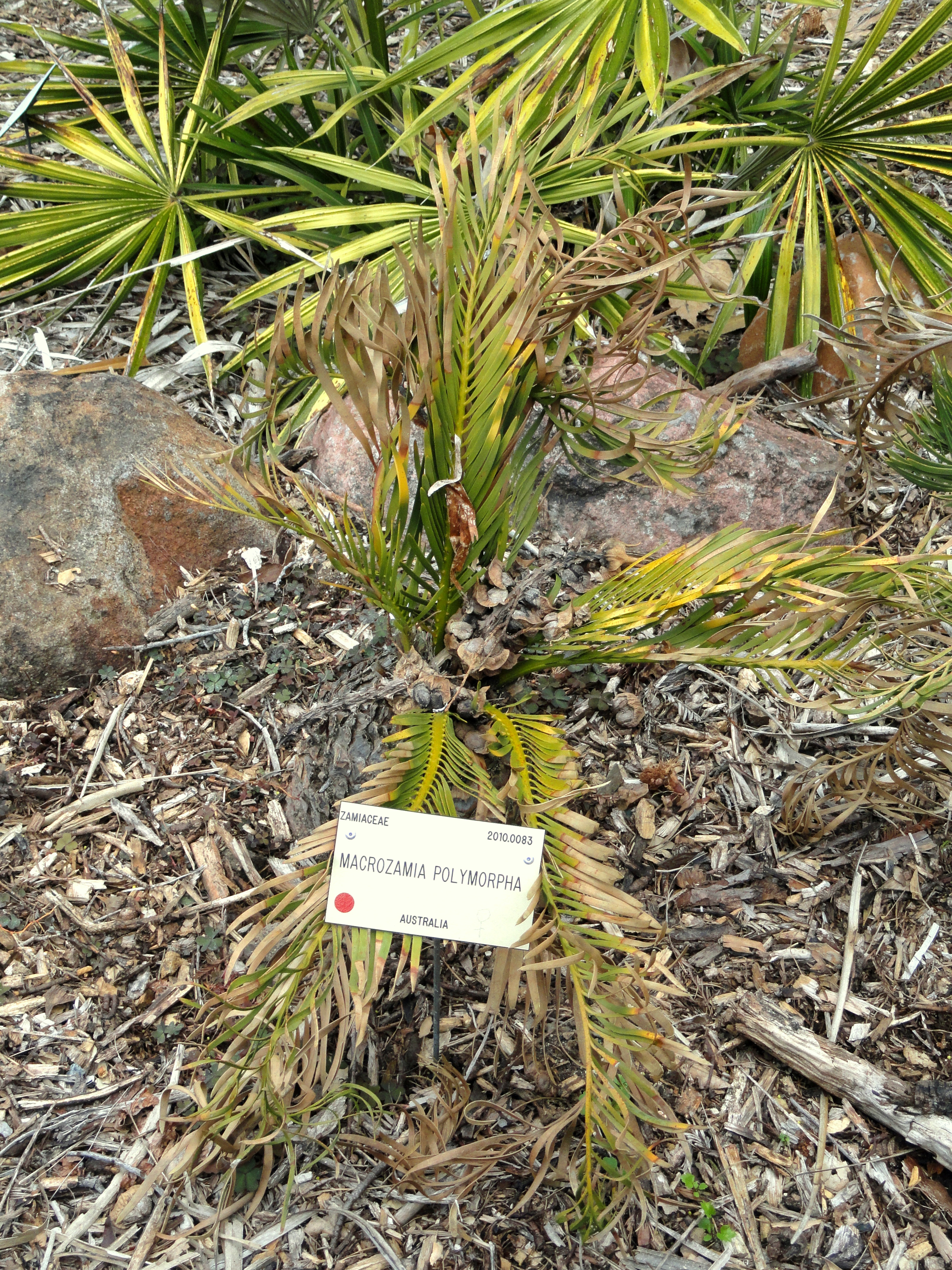
- Macrozamia polymorpha specimen in the University of California Botanical Garden, Berkeley, California, USA

Conservation status
- Least Concern (IUCN 3.1)

Scientific classification
- Kingdom: Plantae
- Clade: Tracheophytes
- Clade: Gymnospermae
- Division: Cycadophyta
- Class: Cycadopsida
- Order: Cycadales
- Family: Zamiaceae
- Genus: Macrozamia
- Species: M. polymorpha

Binomial name
- Macrozamia polymorpha D.L.Jones
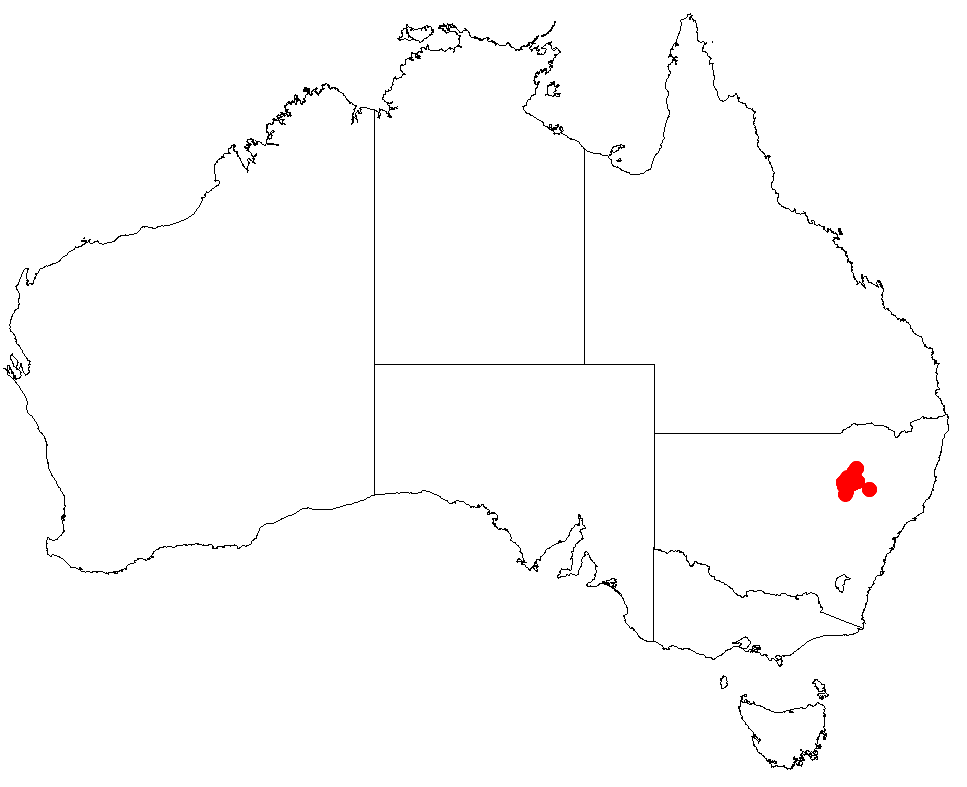
- Occurrence data from AVH

= Macrozamia polymorpha =

Species of cycad

Macrozamia polymorpha is a species of plant in the family Zamiaceae. It is endemic to New South Wales, Australia.
