= Jens Hansen Lundager =

Australian politician (1853–1930)

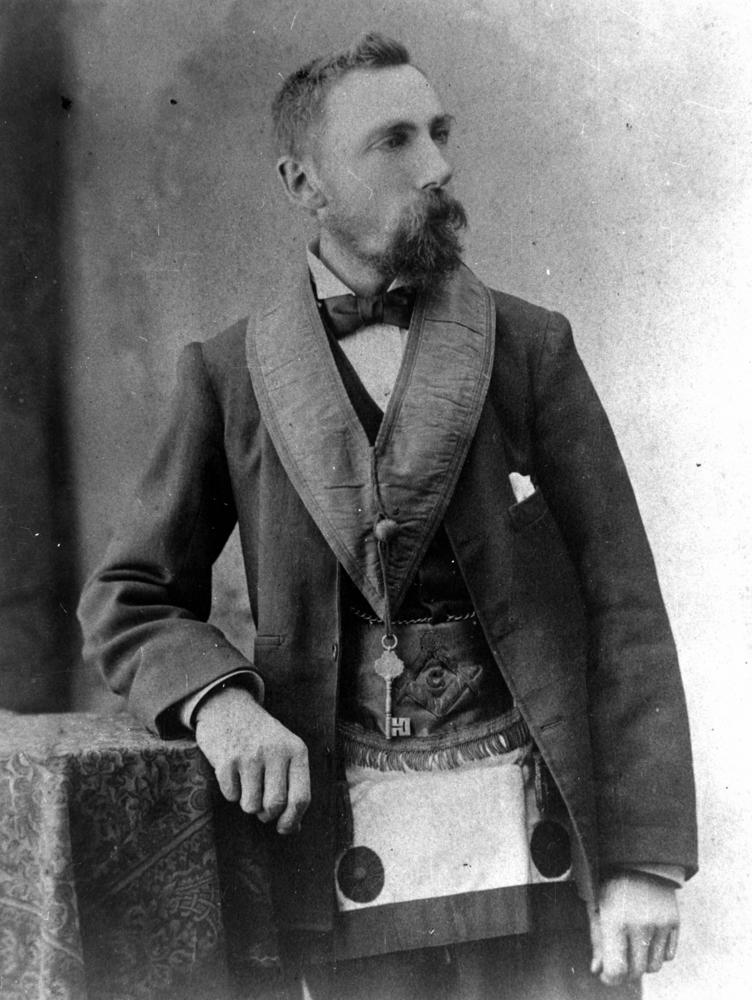
Jens Hansen Lundager

Jens Hansen Lundager (4 May 1853 – 7 March 1930) was a Danish-born Australian photographer, newspaper editor and politician.

== Early life ==
Lundager was born, along with a twin sister, in Vejlby, Denmark on 4 May 1853 to Hans Jensen Hansen and Else AndersDatte Hansen. At birth, he was named Jens Larsen Hansen. It was not until after he emigrated to Australia that he changed his surname to Lundager, which is believed to have been the name of his mother's home village.

He grew up in Bogense. Lundager's mother died when he was eleven, forcing him to find work as a servant before eventually relocating to Odense where he learnt pottery.

Lundager contracted tuberculosis leaving him unable to work for two years. When he was ready to work again, he had to find less physically challenging work, and therefore entered the field of photography, establishing his own photography business in Fredericia. However, Lundager still struggled to recover, prompting his doctor to suggest that he consider seeking a warmer climate. Lundager decided to emigrate to Australia.

== Arrival in Australia ==
Lundager made the journey from Hamburg to Rockhampton aboard the immigrant ship Charles Dickens, arriving in Keppel Bay on 26 February 1879. Lundager was among 208 Danes who arrived in Rockhampton on the ship. Seven people, including two children, had died during the journey and four babies were born between Hamburg and Rockhampton.

It was claimed that a number of passengers had arrived in Rockhampton under the impression that they would be entitled to receive a land order, enabling them to settle on and cultivate a parcel of land. This was despite the land order system being abolished several years earlier.

There was also criticism of the timing of Charles Dickens' arrival due to the fact that passengers aboard a previous immigrant ship, The Carnatic had "gutted" the local labour market, which many believed would make it particularly difficult for the immigrants from the Charles Dickens to find work.

After his arrival in Rockhampton, Lundager undertook some photography work but briefly went to the goldfields at Temora in the Riverina district of New South Wales. Upon his return to Rockhampton, he took over a photographic studio originally established by French photographer Louis Buderus. who moved to Clermont, Queensland to open a photographic studio there in 1884.

== Personal life ==
After settling in Rockhampton, Lundager married Mathilde Helene in 1882 and was naturalised as an Australian in 1883. Lundager and his wife had seven children: Else Johanna, Marie Chrestine, Henry Walter, Hulda Hellene, Mary Christina, Alma May and Dagmar Mathilde. Two of their children, Marie and Henry, both died from diphtheria in 1890.

== Photography ==
Lundager soon became well known in the local area for his high quality photography. The Mount Morgan Mine commissioned Lundager to take portraits of mine owners, managers, guests, mine workers and of the actual mine operations at Mount Morgan.

In 1885, the Queensland Government commissioned Lundager to create an album for the Colonial and Indian Exhibition of 1886 in London, for which he received praise and a bronze medal. His work was praised in London's Photographic News magazine, which described a contemporaneous South Australian work as dull, with the "dullness" more noticeable against the works of Lundager. According to the magazine, Lundager had succeeded in his works of the Mount Morgan Mine, obtaining a quality inseparable from good landscape work. The publication pondered if Queensland was more suitable for photography than South Australia or whether the difference was due to the photographer who created the work.

In 1889, the Rockhampton Reception Committee presented an album of Lundager's works were to visiting Irish MP and Home Rule advocate John Dillon. Dillon was on an Australian fundraising tour for the Irish National Movement and gave lectures at the Hibernian Hall in Rockhampton and at the Mount Morgan School of Arts.

Throughout his busy public life, Lundager continued his passion for photography and in 1911, released Central Queensland Illustrated, a compilation of photos he had taken in Central Queensland as a tribute and record to commemorate the region's 50th anniversary.

== Studio fire ==
In early November 1889, Lundager's shop in Rockhampton's East Street was destroyed in an overnight blaze. Although some equipment including a camera and some photographs were saved, many valuable photos and negatives were destroyed in the fire.

After the fire, Lundager made the decision to permanently take up residence in Mount Morgan, 25 miles from Rockhampton.

== Relocation ==
After relocating to Mount Morgan, Lundager again established a photographic business. He also became a bookseller and stationery agent to supplement his income.

He was a foundation member of the Mount Morgan Masonic Lodge in 1888 and its long-term treasurer.

In 1905, Lundager was unanimously elected mayor at the Mount Morgan Town Council. Before being officially elected as mayor, Lundager was already an alderman with the council and was serving as acting mayor. Lundager was again elected mayor of Mount Morgan Town Council in 1906.

His interest in politics also extended to a Federal level. Lundager was a candidate for a seat in the Australian Senate at the 1906 federal election winning over 47,000 votes.

Throughout his time in Mount Morgan, Lundager was involved in the Mount Morgan Progress Association, the Mount Morgan School of Arts, the Mount Morgan Hospital Committee, the Mount Morgan Technical College, the Mount Morgan Boys' School Committee, the Mount Morgan Girls' School Committee, the Penny Savings Bank, the Gordon Club, the Mount Morgan Licensing Bench, the Mount Morgan Masonic Lodge, the Workers' Political Organisation and the Australian Workers' Association.

Additionally, he was editor and part-proprietor of the local newspaper Mount Morgan Argus for six years – a version of which is still being published today. He was also vocal proponent for the Dawson Valley railway line.

Following declining health including the re-emergence of tuberculosis, Lundager began to withdraw from his various public and political interests in Mount Morgan in 1912, following advice from doctors. In an article published in The Morning Bulletin, the writer inferred that Lundager's health was inevitably going to suffer due to the strenuous life he had led for many years, without taking a break.

In 1919, Lundager made the decision to leave Mount Morgan and relocate to Sydney but not before his shop in Mount Morgan was ransacked in 1916 when thieves gained access to the premises through an unlocked window to steal various items, although they overlooked a number of valuable possessions during the break-in.

== Death ==
Lundager died at his home in Chatswood, New South Wales on 7 March 1930 at the age of 76. He is buried at the Methodist Cemetery in North Sydney.

== Legacy ==
Lundager's photographic work is still regularly used to illustrate the various developments, events and people of Central Queensland of the late 19th century and the early 20th century.

Lundager was also the subject of a 1992 Journal of Australian studies article by Grahame Griffin, entitled J. H. Lundager, Mount Morgan politician and photographer: company hack or subtle subversive?
