= Henry Leeson =

Australian cricketer

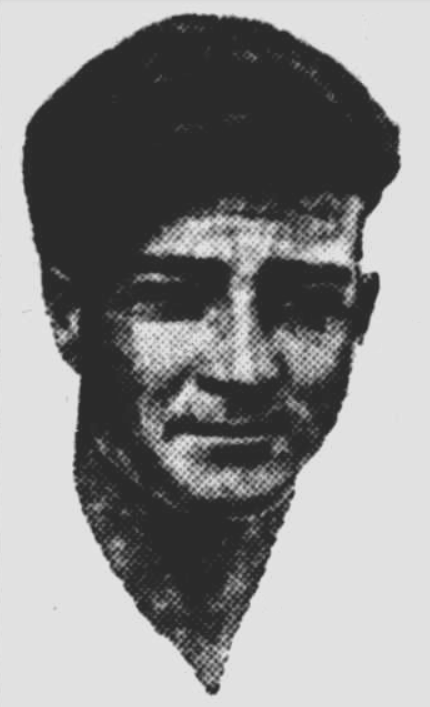

Personal information
- Born: 20 July 1908; Mount Morgan, Queensland, Australia
- Died: 25 June 1950 (aged 41); Logan River, Queensland, Australia
- Source: Cricinfo, 5 October 2020

Henry Leeson (20 July 1908 – 25 June 1950) was an Australian cricketer. He played in fourteen first-class matches for Queensland between 1929 and 1935.

== See also ==
- List of Queensland first-class cricketers
