= Mount Morgan Cemetery =

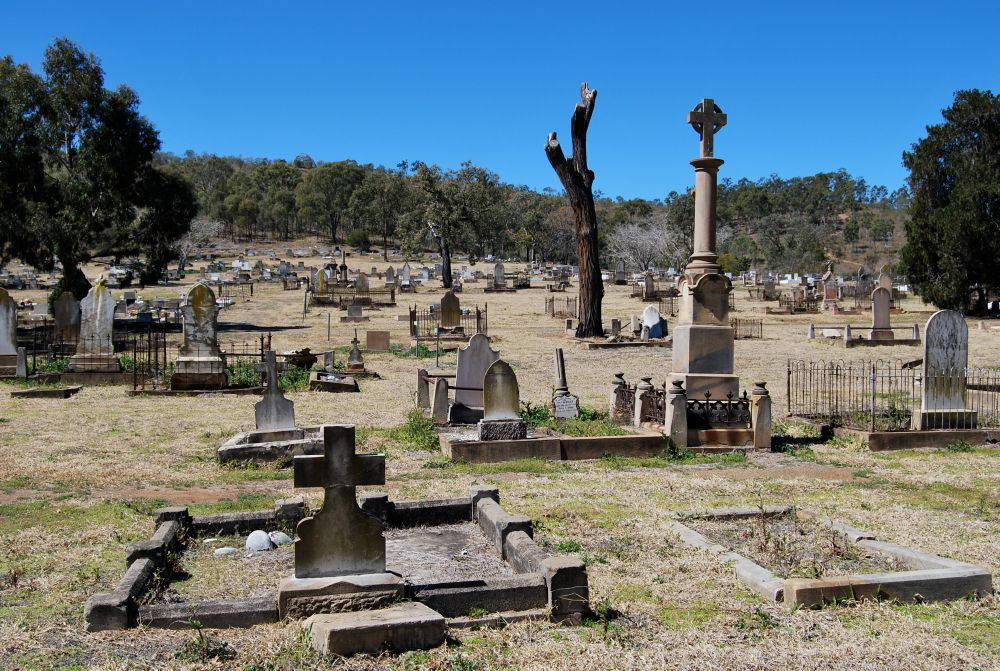
- Mount Morgan Cemetery, 2008

- Location within Queensland Location within Australia
- 23.6578°S 150.3902°E
- Location: East Street, Mount Morgan, Rockhampton Region, Queensland, Australia

History
- Design period: 1870s–1890s (late 19th century)
- Built: 1886

Site notes
- Owner: Rockhampton Regional Council

Queensland Heritage Register
- Official name: Mount Morgan Cemetery including Chinese Shrine and Linda Memorial
- Type: state heritage (landscape, built)
- Designated: 21 October 1992
- Reference no.: 600753
- Significant period: 1886– (social); 1886–1990s (historical, fabric)
- Significant components: grave marker, headstone, gate – entrance, memorial – cairn, seating, chinese ceremonial burner, memorial – column (broken), pathway/walkway, sarcophagus

Mount Morgan Cemetery is a heritage-listed cemetery at East Street, Mount Morgan, Rockhampton Region, Queensland, Australia. It was established in 1886. It was added to the Queensland Heritage Register on 21 October 1992.

== History ==
The earliest burial recorded in Mount Morgan Cemetery is that of James Kennedy in 1886. The cemetery was reserved in 1889 and occupies an area of 4.5 hectares (11 acres) of land to the south of the township. It continues in use and has many fine and unusual memorials.

Mount Morgan is a town which developed to support the open cut Mount Morgan Mine situated on the Dee River, 30 kilometres (19 mi) south west of Rockhampton. It was part of Calliungal pastoral run taken up by the Leith Hay family in the 1850s. Although gold bearing ore had been found in the area in 1870, it was not until 1882 that the three Morgan brothers and other businessmen formed a syndicate to mine and process deposits at Ironstone Mountain, which proved extremely rich. Mount Morgan was mined for 99 years, yielding 225,000 kilos of gold, 50,000 kilos of silver and 360,000 metric tons (350,000 long tons; 400,000 short tons) of copper. The mine was the economic focus of the town until ore production ceased in 1981 and the company finally ceased operations on 31 December 1992. The cemetery has continuously served the town for virtually the whole of its existence.

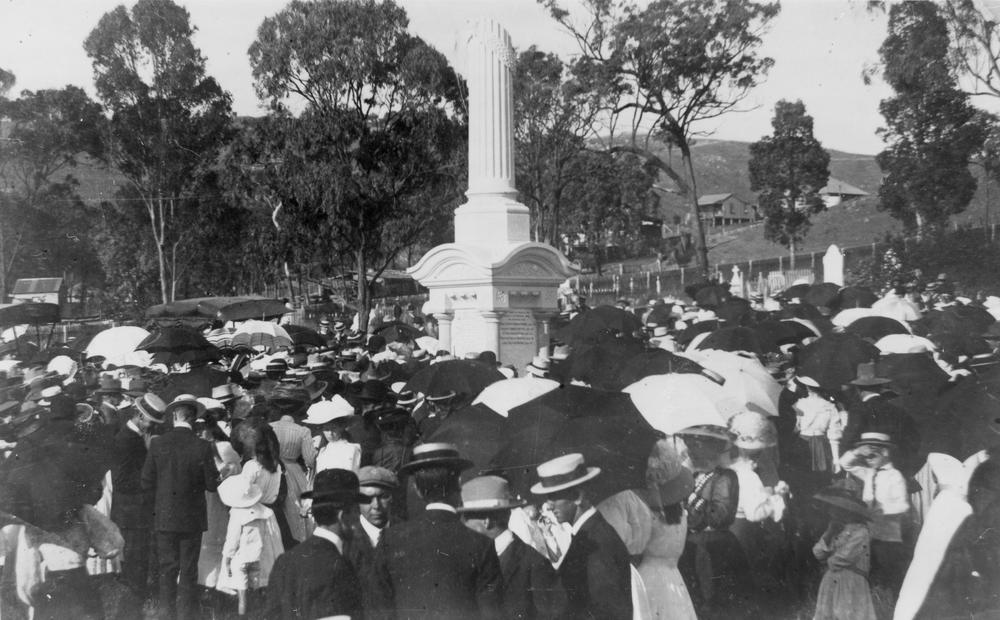
Crowds at the unveiling of Linda Memorial Monument, Mt Morgan, 1909

The most striking memorial in the cemetery is probably the Linda Memorial. On 5 November 1908, an accident occurred in the Linda section of the mine in which seven men where killed. Widespread concern and sympathy were evoked and a large public funeral was held. Five more miners were killed on 4 November of that year and a monument was erected for all who had died as the result of accidents in the Mount Morgan Mine; a total of 26 miners between 3 December 1894 and 28 July 1909. The memorial was constructed in 1909 by Busby and Hurlow of Toowong, Brisbane and unveiled by the Mayor of Mount Morgan, John Morrison, on 7 November 1909. It is a fitting memorial in a mining town and a poignant reminder of the danger inherent in mining operations.

The cemetery also contains a Chinese ceremonial burner, (a heung lew or xiang lu), thought to be the only one of its type and age in Queensland, which was used for burning symbolic papers and offerings for the dead. There were many Chinese in Mount Morgan from its inception working in mining, trade and market gardening. Most Chinese in Australia in the 19th century were sojourners, working here to earn money and then return home. Traditionally, Chinese who died overseas were buried locally and their remains exhumed and repatriated when this could be arranged by their families. Because of this custom, some burials were accompanied by a bottle containing identification details, rather than by erecting a headstone. Many such burials were not, in fact, relocated and the burner was used both for funerary offerings and for special festival offerings. The shrine is one of the few physical reminders of the Chinese community of Mount Morgan, who played an important role in developing the town. It is not known if there are still accompanying burials.

The cemetery also contains a broad range of memorials from the 1880s to the present day, many of a high quality of workmanship.

The cemetery contains six Commonwealth war graves of Australian Army soldiers of World War I.

== Description ==
The Mount Morgan Cemetery sits on a west facing hill on the east side of the Burnett Highway, south of the township. The cemetery is bounded by a star picket and wire fence with some timber posts on the northern side. There are brick gates, also serving as a columbarium, on the eastern side adjacent to the Apex Park which separates the cemetery from the Highway. A standard stock gate to the north and three pedestrian turnstiles, two along the curved south eastern corner and one along the northern boundary, provide access to the cemetery.

The cemetery is divided into sections by paths connecting to a main avenue entered by a cast iron gate and turnstile. Large pines line the path and cast iron seating is found along it. The cemetery is arranged into denominational areas in north–south strips and have been developed east to west up the hill. The cemetery contains a wide array of monumental masonry. The headstones are laid in traditional east–west orientation, most are the work of Rockhampton masons although some were made by masons in Brisbane. A number of the graves are surrounded with iron railings in a variety of designs. There is an extensive range of materials utilised in the construction of the monuments mostly white marble, sandstone and grey granite, but also red granite, iron, concrete and timber. The styles of memorials range from simple Georgian forms to elaborate Gothic, Edwardian and Victorian structures, as well as Art Deco inspired and modern slab and desk types. A high proportion of graves have artificial flowers in glass domes (immortelles), early examples being porcelain and recent ones silk flowers.

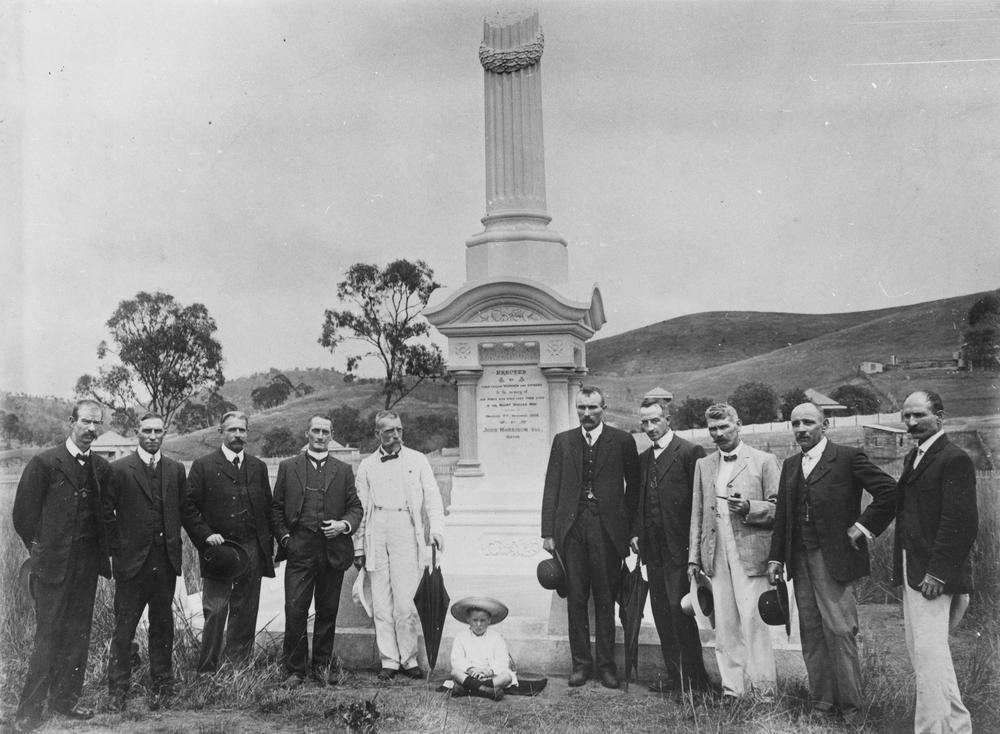
Group photograph of Linda Memorial Committee at the Monument, Mt. Morgan, 1909

The Linda Memorial is a concrete structure approximately 6.5 metres (21 ft) high. It comprises a square base surmounted by a broken, reeded column, symbolising life cut short, which is about 2 metres (6 ft 7 in) high and surmounted by a wreath. Marble panels on each of the four faces carry the names of miners killed in accidents. Floral emblems including the rose, shamrock and thistle, symbolising the countries of origin of the miners decorate the base of the memorial which is surrounded by a low concrete wall. An inscription on the front of the memorial reads:

Erected by their fellow workmen and citizens to the memory of the miners who have lost their lives in the Mount Morgan Mine unveiled 7th November 1909 by James Morrison, Esq., Mayor.

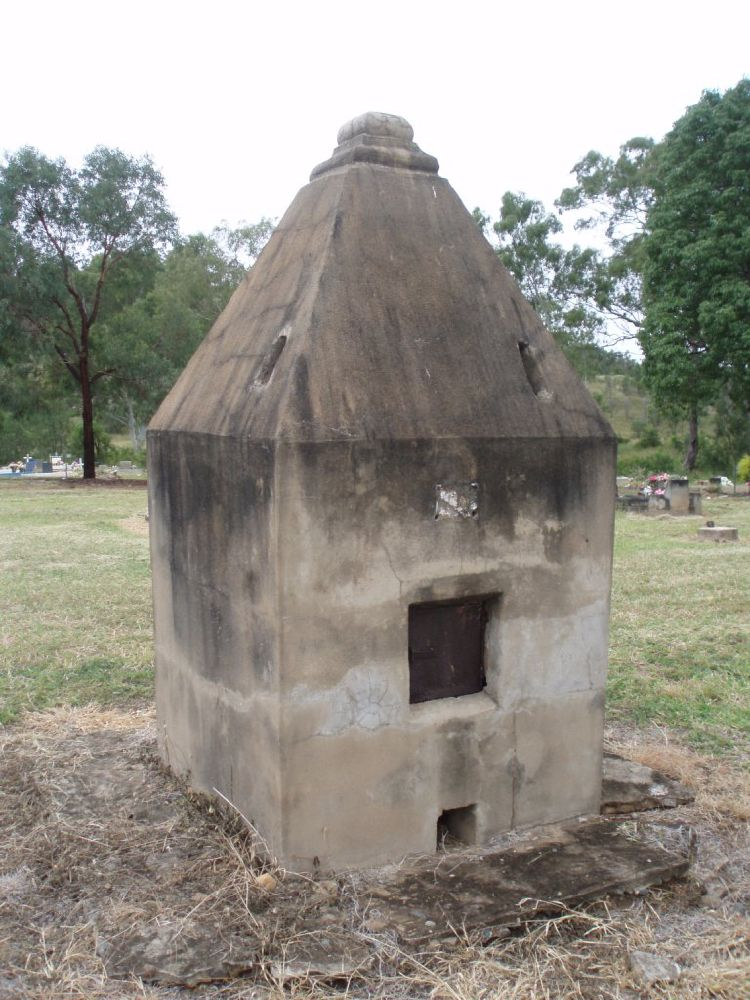
Chinese ceremonial burner, 2009

The Chinese burner is sited with the hillside rising behind it, regarded as an auspicious location, and is constructed of rendered brick and concrete set on a concrete base. It is approximately 2.230 metres (7 ft 3.8 in) high and comprises a 1.250-metre (4 ft 1.2 in) square base surmounted by a truncated pyramid topped by a small two tiered ornament. There is an oven opening in the centre of one side with a metal door set it in and an opening for removing ash below. Small elongated oval vents are set to the right hand side of 3 faces of the pyramid top.

Other monuments of note include:

- a three-metre-high (9.8-foot) Celtic cross with shamrock motif erected for Thomas and Katherine Barret and their children (1910s)
- a three-metre-high (9.8-foot) sandstone broken column with a rusticated pedestal and white marble tablet and a sandstone football for Tom Harrow Manson in 1907 and 'erected by his many sporting friends'
- white marble slab with an inscription laid in copper to Giovanni Dannetto who "met his death at the copper works", erected by his colleagues in 1909
- a sandstone sarcophagus with stylised medieval cross in relief for Edward Pigott in 1928
- a carving of an angel and a white marble stele to Ellen Lyons in 1908
- a Chinese grave with narrow sandstone headstone with Chinese script to Ah Sha
- a 1990s memorial cairn for the Bayali, the local Aboriginal people, which marks bones returned from London
- a number of graves with framed supports on which are set immortelles, some inside protective cylinders

There are only a few major plantings, mainly trees, which predominantly include eucalyptus and poinciana. There are some remnant plantings including orchids, mother of millions, various bulbs, aloe, yucca, camellia, oleander and geranium, but evidence on site suggests that other plantings may have been killed by poisoning. Ground cover is a mixture of native and introduced grasses.

== Heritage listing ==
Mount Morgan Cemetery including Chinese Shrine and Linda Memorial was listed on the Queensland Heritage Register on 21 October 1992 having satisfied the following criteria.

The place is important in demonstrating the evolution or pattern of Queensland's history.

The cemetery in its form, memorials and plantings illustrates the history of Mt Morgan, a major mining centre in Queensland which made an important contribution to the economy of the state for over a hundred years.

The place demonstrates rare, uncommon or endangered aspects of Queensland's cultural heritage.

The Mount Morgan cemetery contains a well-preserved Chinese ceremonial burner believed to be the only example of its kind in Queensland.

The place has potential to yield information that will contribute to an understanding of Queensland's history.

The cemetery has the potential to reveal information on burial customs of the late 19th and 20th centuries and on the social fabric of Mount Morgan.

The place is important in demonstrating the principal characteristics of a particular class of cultural places.

It is a good example of a regional cemetery in use since the end of the 19th century and includes a broad range of memorials, including some that are idiosyncratic and personalised.

The place is important because of its aesthetic significance.

Many of the monuments in Mount Morgan cemetery have aesthetic significance due to the high quality of workmanship and design used in their construction and to their garden setting.

The place has a strong or special association with a particular community or cultural group for social, cultural or spiritual reasons.

The cemetery has a special association with the community of Mount Morgan and the surrounding area.
