= Coronation Lamp War Memorial =

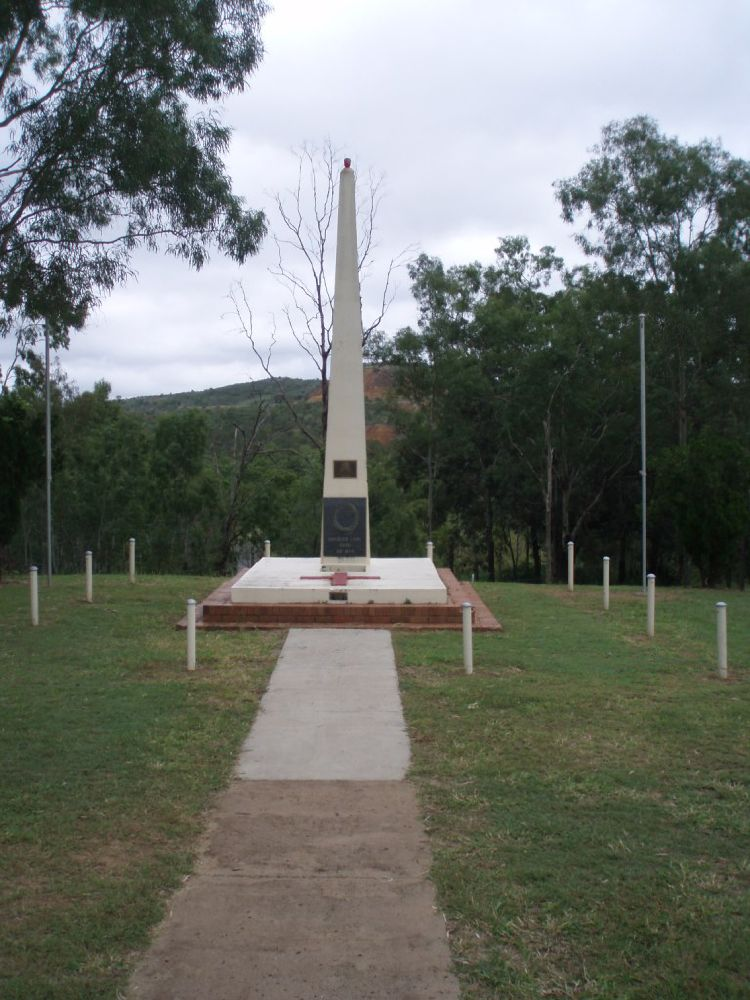
- Coronation Lamp War Memorial, 2009

- Location within Queensland
- 23.6458°S 150.3846°E
- Location: Morgan Street, Mount Morgan, Rockhampton Region, Queensland, Australia

History
- Design period: 1900–1914 (early 20th century)
- Built: 1902–1947

Site notes
- Architect: Arthur Jenks
- Architectural style: Classicism

Queensland Heritage Register
- Official name: The Coronation Lamp, Boer War Memorial, The Coronation Light
- Type: state heritage (built, landscape)
- Designated: 21 October 1992
- Reference no.: 600750
- Significant period: 1902– (social); 1902–1947 (historical); 1902 (fabric)
- Significant components: memorial – obelisk, park / green space, trees/plantings, memorial – lamp

Coronation Lamp is a heritage-listed war memorial at Morgan Street, Mount Morgan, Rockhampton Region, Queensland, Australia. It was designed by Arthur Jenks and built from 1902 to 1947. It is also known as Boer War Memorial and The Coronation Light. It was added to the Queensland Heritage Register on 21 October 1992.

== History ==
The Coronation Lamp and Boer War Memorial was erected on 26 June 1902 as part of Mount Morgan's coronation celebrations. The memorial was commissioned by the Mount Morgan Municipal Council and is thought to be designed by Arthur Jenks who, at the time, was Clerk of Works for the erection of the Mount Morgan Technical College. As well as commemorating the coronation of King Edward VII, it also honours the Mount Morgan troopers who died in the Boer War in South Africa. It originally stood at the intersection of Morgan and East Streets, and although known as the Coronation Lamp, the lamp eventually became the site of Anzac Day commemorations, the first in 1916 and also of victory celebrations at the end of the First World War.

In 1947, the Coronation Lamp was relocated to Anzac Park when the main street was bituminised.

The township of Mount Morgan grew with the establishment of what was to become the richest single gold mine in the world. Although small mining claims had occurred previously, in 1882 the three Morgan Brothers pegged claims which encompassed most of the mountain top. In July of the same year, they formed a partnership with three Rockhampton businessmen. They became extremely prosperous before selling out to their partners in 1886 who then formed the Mount Morgan Gold Mining Company Limited. The township quickly developed, setting up a much needed infrastructure. The three partners continued the company business until 1929 when a new company was formed after many miners disputes. The mine continued to produce gold and copper until it closed in 1990.

At the time of the Boer War, the citizens of Mount Morgan showed a great deal of patriotism. The local children were encouraged to donate pennies to be melted down to form the huge Mafeking bell which originally hung in the Town Hall.

The Mount Morgan memorial was constructed at an early phase of the history of war memorials in the state. After the First World War, the construction of war memorials was prolific. Australian war memorials are valuable evidence of imperial and national loyalties, at the time not seen as conflicting; the skills of local stonemasons, metalworkers and architects; and of popular taste.

Although there are now many different types of memorials throughout Queensland there are few Boer Memorials and only one known one in the form of a lamp. The memorial at Mount Morgan was originally a gas lamp but has since been converted to electricity.

== Description ==
The Boer War Memorial is situated in Anzac Park facing West Street in Mount Morgan. The park is on a sloping site with the Mount Morgan Gold and Copper Works in the background. It stands close to the road and is surrounded by mature trees. A sign which displays the name of the park is located directly in front of the memorial. Also located in the park, directly behind the Boer War Memorial is the First World War Memorial.

The painted concrete memorial comprises a concrete pedestal surmounted by a lamp. The pedestal sits on a base capped with a cyma recta moulding. The pedestal itself has recessed sections with mouldings to each face. The front and rear faces have marble plates with cut and blackened lettering commemorating the local men who fell in the Boer War and celebrating the Coronation. The dado is capped by a large entablature comprising a frieze and cornice of multiple steps and mouldings. The cornice is surmounted by two more steps which form a base for the lamp.

The lamp is a cast iron gas standard, approximately 15 feet (4.6 m) high. It is fluted and culminates in an Egyptian capital. Extending from the capital are two iron rods on either side and two fluorescent lights from the top.

== Heritage listing ==
The Coronation Lamp War Memorial was listed on the Queensland Heritage Register on 21 October 1992 having satisfied the following criteria.

The place is important in demonstrating the evolution or pattern of Queensland's history.

War memorials are important in demonstrating the pattern of Queensland's history as they are representative of a recurrent theme that involved most communities throughout the state. They provide evidence of an era of widespread Australian patriotism and nationalism, particularly during and following the First World War. The monuments manifest a unique documentary record and are demonstrative of popular taste in the inter-war period.

This Boer War Memorial is an important Queensland monument. The memorial was constructed at an early phase of the history of war memorials in the state and is one of the few memorials in Queensland to commemorate the involvement and death of Queensland soldiers in the Boer War of 1899–1902.

The place demonstrates rare, uncommon or endangered aspects of Queensland's cultural heritage.

After the First World War, memorials were erected in most Queensland towns, however in 1902, when this memorial was unveiled, they were still quite rare. This particular memorial is also rare as the first known memorial in Queensland to the Boer War and as the only memorial to commemorate both the Boer War and the Coronation of King Edward VII. As a lamp, it is an unusual type of memorial.

The place is important because of its aesthetic significance.

The memorial and its setting contribute to the aesthetic qualities of the townscape. The memorial is of aesthetic significance for its high level of workmanship and design.

The place has a strong or special association with a particular community or cultural group for social, cultural or spiritual reasons.

It has a strong and continuing association with the community as evidence of the impact of a major historic event and as the focal point for the remembrance of that event.
