= Mount Morgan Court House and Police Station =

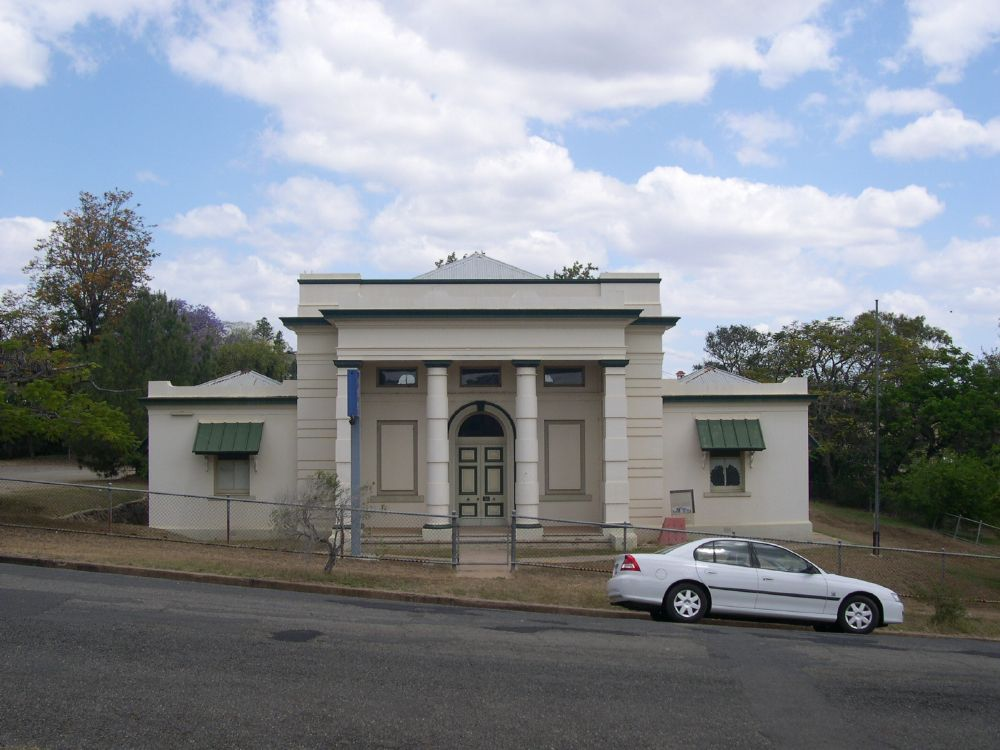
- Mount Morgan Court House and Police Station, 2006

- Location within Queensland Location within Australia
- 23.6484°S 150.3884°E
- Location: 28 Hall Street, Mount Morgan, Rockhampton Region, Queensland, Australia

History
- Design period: 1870s–1890s (late 19th century)
- Built: 1898–1900

Site notes
- Architect: Queensland Department of Public Works
- Architectural style: Classicism

Queensland Heritage Register
- Official name: Court House and Police Station
- Type: state heritage (built)
- Designated: 21 October 1992
- Reference no.: 600745
- Significant period: 1898–1900s (historical); 1898–1900s (fabric)
- Significant components: police station, court house
- Builders: John Macfarlane and Co

Mount Morgan Court House and Police Station is a heritage-listed courthouse and police station at 28 Hall Street, Mount Morgan, Rockhampton Region, Queensland, Australia. It was designed by Queensland Department of Public Works and built from 1898 to 1900 by John Macfarlane and Co. It was added to the Queensland Heritage Register on 21 October 1992.

== History ==
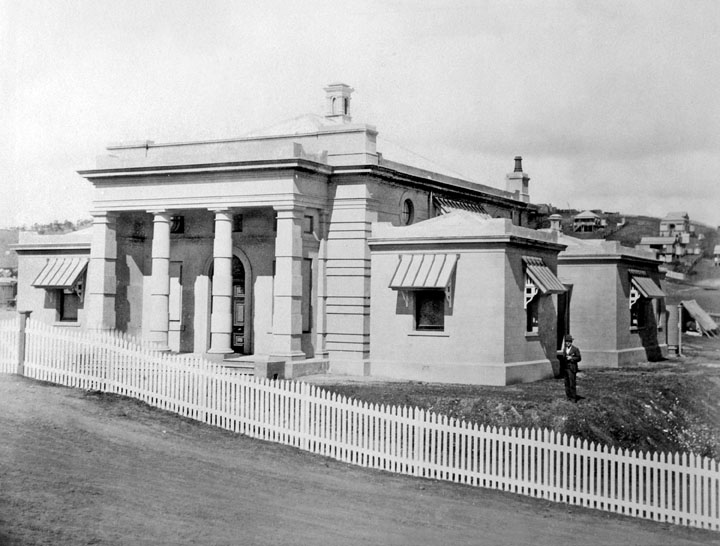
Court House, Mount Morgan, c1890s

The Mount Morgan Court House and Police Station was constructed in 1900 to the design of the Works Department as the second court house in Mount Morgan.

The township of Mount Morgan grew with the establishment of what was to become the richest gold mine in the world. Although small mining claims occurred before 1882, the three Morgan Brothers pegged claims which encompassed most of the mountain top in that year. In July they formed a partnership with three Rockhampton businessmen before selling out to them in 1886 when the Mount Morgan Gold Mining Company Limited was formed. The township quickly developed, establishing infrastructure for the rapidly increasing population. The company continued until 1929 when a new company and continued to produce gold and copper until it closed in 1990.

A police station was constructed in Mount Morgan after a report of 11 February 1887 suggested that with a population of 1500 and four hotels, police protection was required. Tenders were called and that of John Wotherspoon for £755 was accepted. In the following year tenders were called for the construction of a court house and that of Martin Doyle and William Gilbert for £409/16/6 was accepted. This building was used for only about ten years. In February 1897 the Mount Morgan and Fitzroy Progress Association carried a resolution to lobby for a new, larger courthouse on a different site. Tenders were called for the construction of the building in the Queensland Government Gazette on 26 May 1898. The contract was awarded to Rockhampton builder, John Macfarlane and Co for a sum of £2995. By 1900 the court house was completed.

== Description ==
The Mount Morgan Court House is a simple one storey classical revival building of rendered brick construction with a hipped roof clad with corrugated iron concealed by moulded cornice parapets. The building is symmetrically composed with a central rectangular planned bay, flanked by squat single storey wings, linked by verandahs. The principal facade features a central projecting entrance portico comprising two banded columns and pilastered returns roofed with a parapeted skillion awning. The columns support an entablature with lettering "COURT HOUSE" on the widest panel of moulding. A central doorway within the porch which is flanked by blind windows, opens onto the internal court room. Surmounting the doorway is an arched fanlight with moulded architrave and keystone. Internally the building has rendered plaster walls, timber floors and timber boarded ceilings. An arch behind the courtroom bench leads to the original principal offices of the courthouse, the former police magistrate and judge's office to one side and the land agent's office to the other. The roof of the courtroom is supported on queen post trusses.

In 1991, the building ceased to be used as a court house but continued to be used by the Queensland Police Service.

== Heritage listing ==
The Mount Morgan Court House and Police Station was listed on the Queensland Heritage Register on 21 October 1992 having satisfied the following criteria.

The place is important in demonstrating the evolution or pattern of Queensland's history.

The Mount Morgan Court House, constructed in 1900, demonstrates the growth of Mount Morgan following the discovery of gold at the Mount Morgan Mine and reflects the importance of the town during this time.

The place is important in demonstrating the principal characteristics of a particular class of cultural places.

The building is characteristic of regional court houses, influenced by classical revival styles imbuing tradition and authority.

The place is important because of its aesthetic significance.

The Mount Morgan Court House is of architectural merit as a small regional example of a classical court house, prominently sited and with interesting features including the banded columns and entrance porch.
