= Grand Hotel, Mount Morgan =

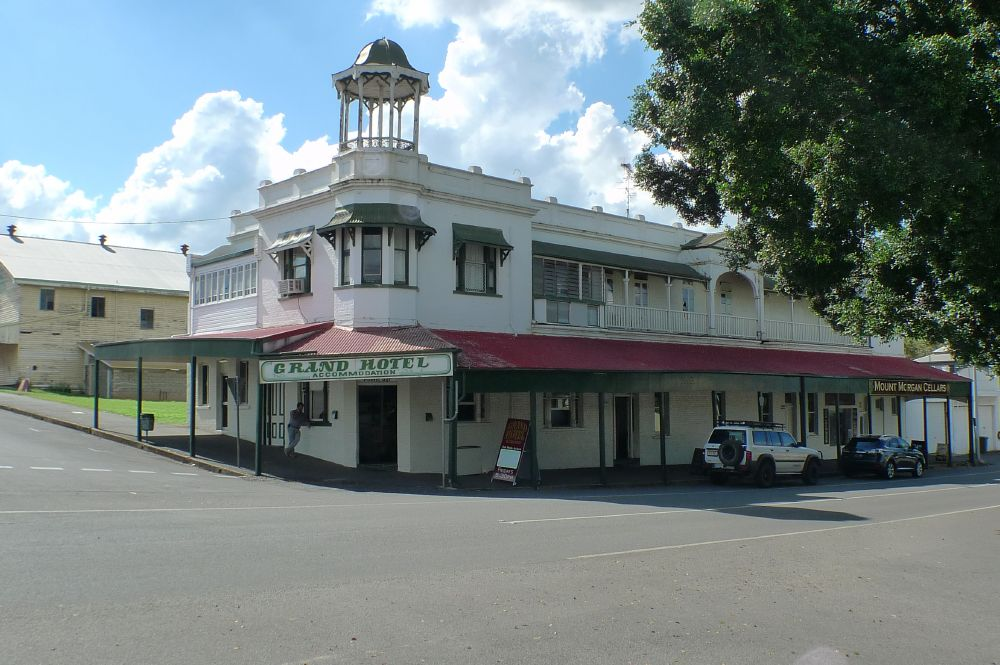
- The Grand Hotel, 2010

- Location within Queensland Location within Australia
- 23.645°S 150.3872°E
- Location: 39 Central Street, Mount Morgan, Rockhampton Region, Queensland, Australia

History
- Design period: 1900–1914 (early 20th century)
- Built: c. 1901

Queensland Heritage Register
- Official name: Grand Hotel
- Type: state heritage (built)
- Designated: 21 October 1992
- Reference no.: 600743
- Significant period: 1900s (fabric) c. 1901–ongoing (historical use)
- Significant components: tower, laundry / wash house, residential accommodation – housing

Grand Hotel is a heritage-listed hotel at 39 Central Street, Mount Morgan, Rockhampton Region, Queensland, Australia. It was built c. 1901. It was added to the Queensland Heritage Register on 21 October 1992.

== History ==
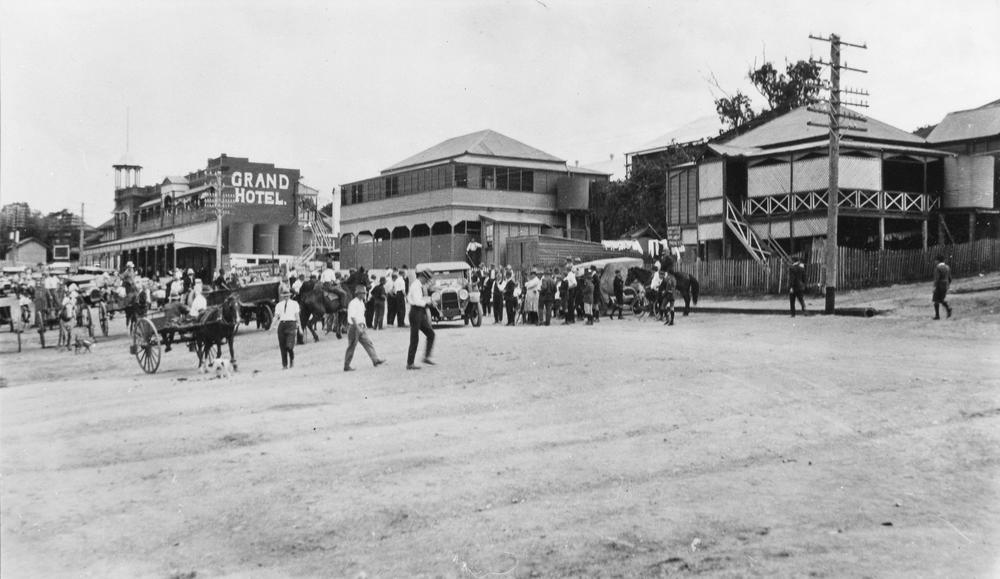
The Grand Hotel (left), 1924

The Grand Hotel is a two-storey brick hotel building and was erected c. 1901 on the corner of Morgan and Central Streets, Mount Morgan.

The township of Mount Morgan grew with the establishment of what was to become the richest gold mine in the world. Although small mining claims occurred before 1882, the three Morgan Brothers pegged claims which encompassed most of the mountain top in that year. In July they formed a partnership with three Rockhampton businessmen before selling out to them in 1886 when the Mount Morgan Gold Mining Company Limited was formed. By the following year even the Queensland Post Office Directory noted that "the importance of this place as a goldfield can scarcely be exaggerated." This led to the rapid development of a township to provide an infrastructure for the increasing population. This development included the construction of a number of hotels, of which the Grand Hotel was one of the most elaborate.

The land on which the Grand Hotel was to be constructed was originally part of the huge portion 247 of 640 acres (260 ha), acquired in 1883 by members of the Mount Morgan Mine syndicate. It was subdivided in 1895 and leased to a number of people who probably had constructed dwellings and commercial buildings on it. In September 1900 a lease on sub 1 of section 6 at the corner of Morgan and Central Streets was acquired by Richard Daniel Shaw. Shaw was an auctioneer and real estate agent although he had held the license on the Leichhardt Hotel in Mount Morgan in 1897. He took out a mortgage for £2000 on his interest in November 1900 and also £4912/1/2 on subs 14–17 in the same block in March 1901.

There was a surge of building in Mount Morgan around the turn of the century and a number of new hotels were built. The Grand Hotel was probably constructed for Shaw and in late 1900 or early 1901 it was being run by Ernest Bale, a hotelier from Rockhampton. Shaw may have had financial problems, because the Queensland National Bank took out a caveat on the mortgage in 1901 and by July the Grand Hotel was being advertised in the Rockhampton Morning Bulletin under the proprietorship of W.D. Eaton. It was claimed to feature "every convenience of a First Class Hotel for families, visitors, tourists and commercial Gentlemen". The coffee and dining rooms were lighted by gas, a service newly available in Mount Morgan, and a telephone line was installed. This was no doubt of value to the commercial travellers who used the sample rooms, as was its central position with regard to the railway station, post office, court house and central business district. A two-storey building across the lane from the hotel on Central Street was constructed as a guest house to take the overflow of guests from the Grand, probably its long term boarders. Eaton did not retain his interest in the hotel, however, and in 1902 it was taken over by Joseph Moulds, an experienced local publican who had previously run the Mountain View Hotel, his lease being formalised in October 1903.

In 1906 the property was formally acquired by the Queensland National Bank as Shaw was declared insolvent in 1904. Moulds died in 1907 and in early 1908 the property, now described as subdivision 1 on section 6 of resubdivision 11 of subdivision B, and measuring about 24 perches (610 m^{2}), was acquired by Lucy Moulds, his widow. The property was purchased in 1917 by Francis Chardon, a butcher, who presumably purchased it as an investment. May Maykin purchased the license from 1920 to 1922.In 1923 a major fire occurred in the block along Morgan Street and the School of Arts was destroyed, probably also removing the series of small shops shown abutting the Grand Hotel in a 1913 photograph. In 1929 the hotel passed to James Hayes, a hotelier. Hayes ran the hotel until his death in an aircraft accident in 1937, but Mrs Hayes and then Charlotte Hayes continued to operate it. The Hayes family acquired the block next to the hotel and in 1949 this and the original subdivision 1 were sold to Richard and Violet McLean, who had been at the Grand since about 1945. In 1989 the hotel passed to Frank (Tapper) and Rose Welsh.

Changes occurring to the hotel over time have been relatively minor and include the painting of the bricks, which were originally a rich ochre red with contrasting cement render detail. The verandah facing Morgan Street on the upper level has been built in and some alterations to ground floor walls and the furnishing and decoration of the bars has occurred.

The bat wing doors that were originally on the corner entrance of the hotel survive as exhibits in the local museum.

== Description ==
The Grand Hotel is a substantial two storey hotel prominently sited at the intersection of Mount Morgan's 2 principal streets. The hotel is constructed of brick and is L-shaped, addressing both street frontages, although the Central Street frontage is longer. The end walls, which face a laneway on Central Street and a vacant block on Morgan Street, are blank. The hipped roof of the building is concealed by a panelled parapet and its most striking feature is a corner bay with an octagonal corner projection surmounted by a timber framed tower with onion dome roof of flat sheet metal. The base of the tower houses one of the principal entrances to the hotel. A wide awning clad with corrugated iron and supported on posts runs along both street frontages and is truncated at the corner and steps up along Morgan Street in line with the street level.

On the upper level of the hotel, verandahs run between the central tower and a projecting room and the end of the building. That facing Central Street has timber posts and timber balustrading. Centrally located on the verandah is a pedimented gabled projection. A similar verandah runs along this guest bedroom wing at the rear of the building. The verandah facing Morgan Street has been built in. The tower has a shaded triple window on the upper level.

Internally the main bar occupies the ground floor corner space and has plastered walls, a pressed metal ceiling and a modern free standing bar. There is a second bar on a higher level corresponding to the slope of Morgan Street. The guest's entrance is from Central Street where double doors with coloured transom lights open into a wide lobby area which also has rendered walls and a pressed metal ceiling. A turned timber staircase is at the end of the hall and leads to the upper storey. To the right of this entrance is a large room created from several smaller ones and the service rooms connected with running the hotel. There are toilets and a detached wash house behind. On the upper floor are small bedrooms running back to back along the Central Street axis. Those facing the street open onto a verandah. The upper floor rooms on the Morgan Street axis comprise an apartment for the publican.

The two storey timber house, which was at one time used as an extension of the hotel's accommodation, survives largely intact although the verandahs have been built in.

== Heritage listing ==
The Grand Hotel in Mount Morgan was listed on the Queensland Heritage Register on 21 October 1992 having satisfied the following criteria.

The place is important in demonstrating the evolution or pattern of Queensland's history.

Mining has played an important role in the development of Queensland and Mt Morgan was an extraordinarily rich mine that operated for over a hundred years, making a major contribution to the economy of the state and the development of the region. As good quality hotel from an important period in the development of the township, the Grand Hotel demonstrates the rapid growth and importance of the field at the beginning of the twentieth century.

The place is important in demonstrating the principal characteristics of a particular class of cultural places.

The Grand Hotel is important as a good example of a substantial regional hotel, designed for a prominent site and employing strong architectural features, including a corner tower and well detailed verandahs to attract custom.

The place is important because of its aesthetic significance.

Because the Grand Hotel is a local landmark, being prominently sited on the major street intersection in the town, and is a well composed building of architectural merit it makes an important contribution to the streetscape and character of the town.
