= Mount Morgan Masonic Temple =

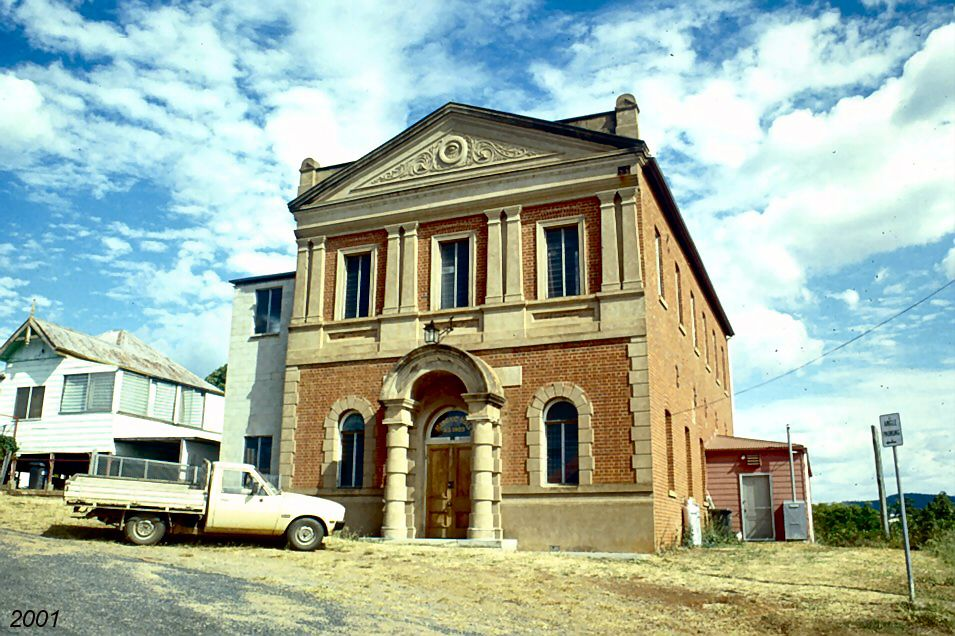
- Masonic Temple Mount Morgan, 2001

- Location within Queensland Location within Australia
- 23°38′49″S 150°23′11″E
- Location: 2 Gordon Street, Mount Morgan, Rockhampton Region, Queensland, Australia

History
- Design period: 1900–1914 (early 20th century)
- Built: 1903

Site notes
- Architect: Eaton & Bates

Queensland Heritage Register
- Official name: Masonic Temple Mount Morgan
- Type: state heritage (built)
- Designated: 21 October 1992
- Reference no.: 600744
- Significant period: 1903 (fabric); 1903–ongoing (social)
- Significant components: furniture/fittings, toilet block/earth closet/water closet, kitchen/kitchen house
- Builders: Newman Brothers

Mount Morgan Masonic Temple is a heritage-listed masonic temple at 2 Gordon Street, Mount Morgan, Rockhampton Region, Queensland, Australia. It was designed by Eaton & Bates and built in 1903 by Newman Brothers. It was added to the Queensland Heritage Register on 21 October 1992.

== History ==
The Mount Morgan Masonic Temple was constructed in about 1903 to the design of Rockhampton architects, Eaton and Bates. The building was constructed by Newman Brothers for a cost of about £1500. The building supervisor was Scottish-born Thomas Glen Cornes (1842–1903), an 1888 foundation member of the Mount Morgan Masonic Lodge No. 763 S.C., its first elected Master in 1889 and superintendent of sawmills and carpenters at the famous Mount Morgan Gold Mining Company Limited.

The township of Mount Morgan grew with the establishment of what was to become the richest gold mine in the world. Although small mining claims were made before 1882, the three Morgan Brothers pegged claims which encompassed most of the mountain top in that year. In July they formed a partnership with three Rockhampton businessmen before selling out to them 1886 when the Mount Morgan Gold Mining Company Limited was formed. The township quickly developed, establishing infrastructure for the rapidly increasing population. The company continued until 1929, when a new company and continued to produce gold and copper until it closed in 1990.

Discussions about forming a Masonic Lodge in Mount Morgan were held soon after the town was established in 1882, although it was not until 29 May 1888 that an official meeting with the purpose of forming a lodge was held. On June 17, 1888, a second meeting was held and a resolution was passed "that a Masonic Lodge be formed in Mount Morgan under the Scottish Constitution". On 4 August 1888 a Lodge was officially formed and the first meeting held in the local Oddfellows' Hall. The Lodge met in many different places and in 1896 passed a resolution "that the lodge take into consideration the advisability of purchasing a piece of ground for the purpose of building a Masonic Hall".

After land in Gordon Street was secured in 1901, a competition was held for the design of the Masonic Temple. A newspaper article in the Queensland Times of Ipswich mentions that a Brisbane architect had been chosen, although Mr Haenke as runner up was to "hold himself in readiness" should the unnamed Brisbane architect be unable to reduce the scope of his design to the budget of about £1000. However, on 10 August 1901 the Lodge met again and reconsidered the tenders, deciding that the design of Messrs Eaton and Bates of Rockhampton was the most appropriate. An article in the Rockhampton Times of 1903 states:

The building is a handsome structure of brick, two stories high and with a composite front. The lower portion of the hall may be used as a dining room and made available for dancing and other functions. The cost was £1500, and was erected by Newman Bros of Rockhampton under supervision of TG Cornes, from the plan of Messrs Eaton and Bates, who were the successful architects when competitive designs were called.

Eaton and Bates were a partnership of George Thomas Eaton and Albert Edmund Bates who opened an office in Rockhampton in 1894 and following success, opened branch offices throughout Central Queensland. The partnership were responsible for many buildings throughout Queensland including a large number of hotels and other commercial buildings.

A small kitchen extension has been added towards the rear, and there is a two-storey concrete block addition to the side. These do not impinge on the original section of the building, which is very intact.

== Description ==
The Mount Morgan Masonic Temple is a substantial two-storeyed brick-and-concrete building facing Gordon street. It has a rectangular floor plan and a gabled roof, concealed by a prominent pedimented parapet on the principal facade. This facade is elaborate and classically inspired with a prominent, centrally located entrance portico. It is constructed from face brick with concrete detailing including quoining, base course, pilasters, pediment and entablature. The entrance comprises two substantial banded columns supporting a round-arched vaulted awning which shades a double timber door surmounted by a round-arched fanlight. On the fanlight is lettering "MASONIC HALL AD 1903".

Flanking the entrance of the Masonic Hall are two round-arched window openings surrounded by quoining. At the level of the first floor line is a substantial cement-rendered band, divided into three rectangular moulded panels with four blocks which support paired Doric order pilasters. Between the pairs of columns are square headed window openings, surrounded by cement-rendered moulding. The pilasters seem to support a simple entablature at roof level which is surmounted by a triangular pediment which expands over the width of the facade. The tympanum features a large central eye motif flanked by foliated mouldings.

There is a large supper room on the ground floor which is used for a variety of social events. The floor above has been braced by inserting a grid of large steel "I" beams below the ceiling of this room. The upper floor is reached by decorative timber stairs and contains an anteroom leading into the lodge room. This is very intact and appears to retains its original furniture. Modern facilities have been housed in additions rather than in the main building. A small timber kitchen annexe with a lean-to roof has been added to the rear south east corner and on the north west side of the building there is a 2-storey addition constructed of unpainted concrete blocks. It is affixed to the temple, but the original wall and windows have not been removed or altered. This contains toilets, a small kitchenette on the upper floor and storage space.

== Heritage listing ==
Masonic Temple Mount Morgan was listed on the Queensland Heritage Register on 21 October 1992, having satisfied the following criteria.

The place is important in demonstrating the evolution or pattern of Queensland's history.

The building, a substantial regional example of a Masonic Temple, was constructed in about 1903 and demonstrates the growth and prominence of Mount Morgan in the early twentieth century and the spread of Freemasonry through Queensland in the wake of European settlement.

The place is important in demonstrating the principal characteristics of a particular class of cultural places.

The building is an excellent example of a substantial masonry Masonic Temple, a category of building prominent in the streetscape and important in the social life of many regional towns.

The place is important because of its aesthetic significance.

It is a well composed and interesting building of considerable architectural merit and, located on a hilltop, has landmark qualities

The place has a strong or special association with a particular community or cultural group for social, cultural or spiritual reasons.

The Masonic temple has a special association with those Freemasons living in and around Mt Morgan and with the Freemasonry movement as an early temple in Queensland.
