= Mount Morgan, Queensland =

Mount Morgan
- Town
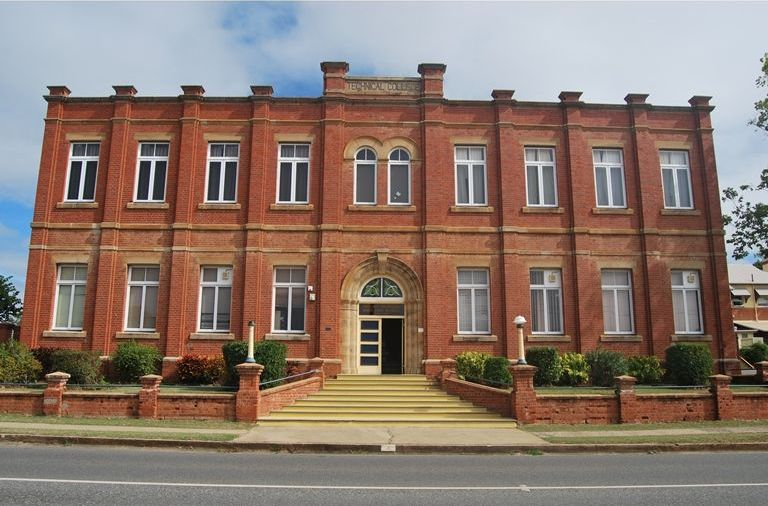
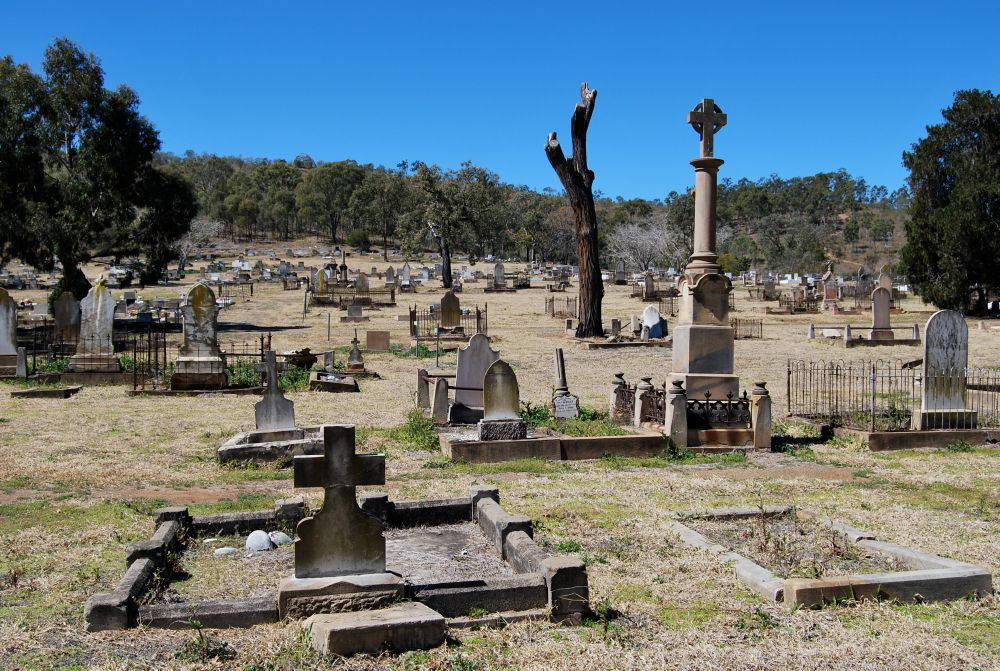
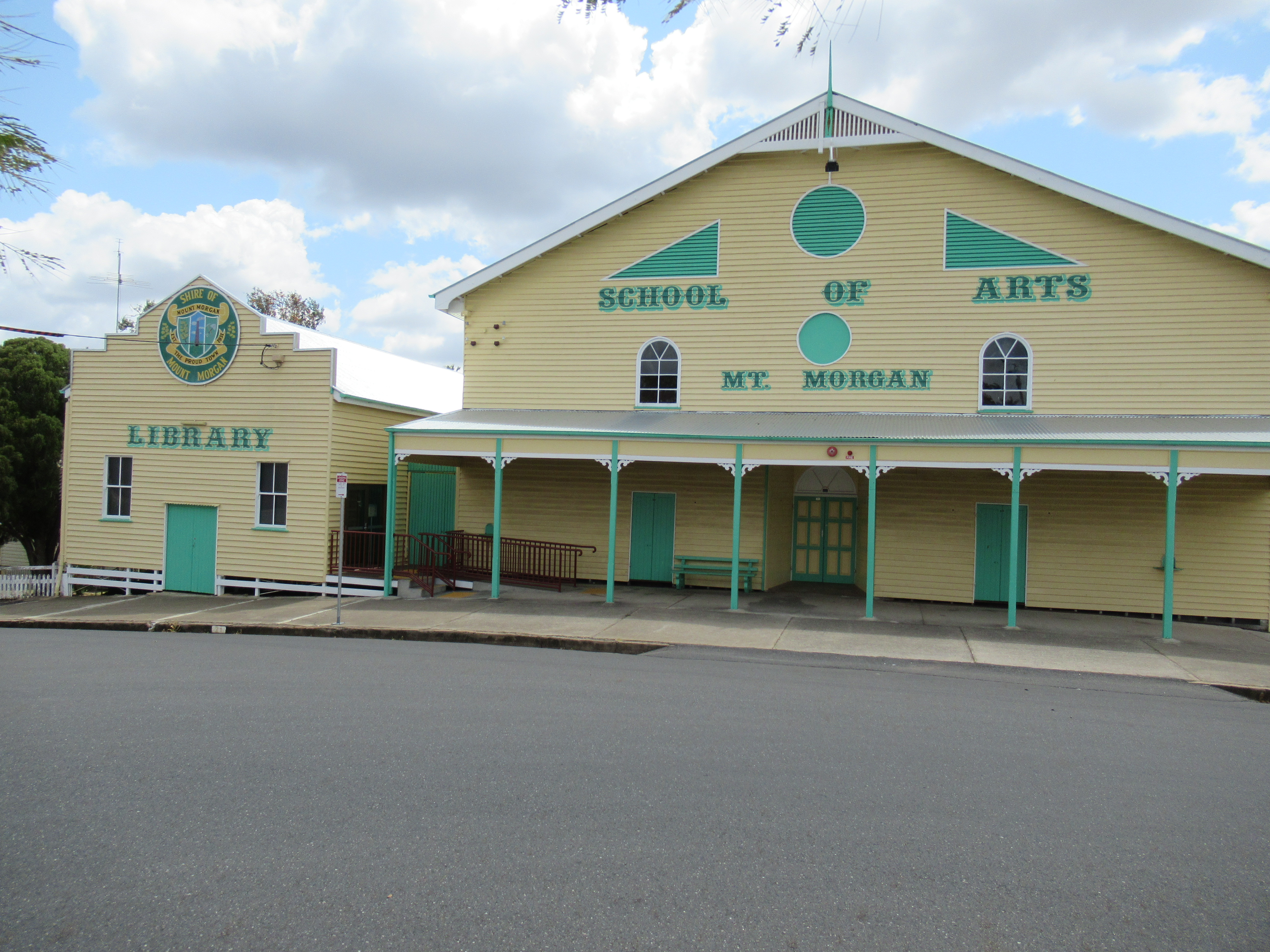
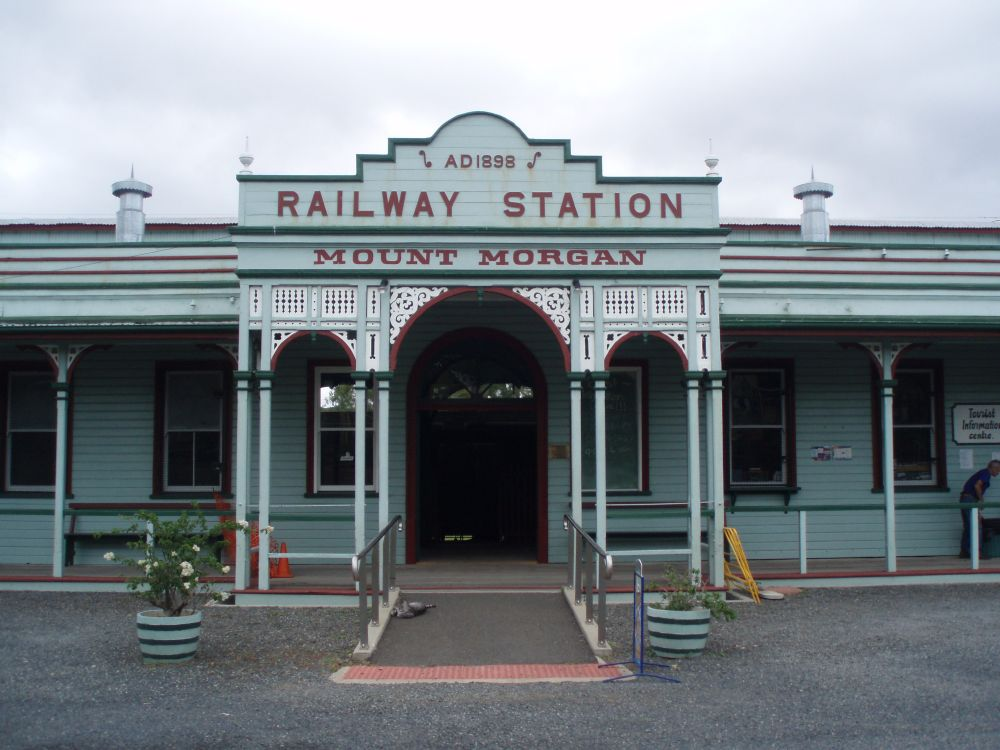
- From left to right; Old Technical College, Mount Morgan Cemetery; Mount Morgan School of Arts, Mount Morgan railway station

- Interactive map of Mount Morgan
- Coordinates: 23.6441°S 150.3897°E
- Country: Australia
- State: Queensland
- LGA: Rockhampton Region
- Location: 39.5 km (24.5 mi) SSW of Rockhampton CBD; 634 km (394 mi) NNW of Brisbane
- Established: 1882

Government
  - State electorate: Mirani
  - Federal division: Flynn

Area
  - Total: 12.1 km^{2} (4.7 sq mi)
- Elevation: 341 m (1,119 ft)

Population
  - Total: 2,487 (2021 census (town))
  - Density: 205.5/km^{2} (532.3/sq mi)
- Time zone: UTC+10:00 (AEST)
- Postcode: 4714
Localities around Mount Morgan
Walterhall	Baree; Leydens Hill	Johnsons Hill
The Mine	Mount Morgan	Struck Oil
Boulder Creek	Horse Creek	Limestone

Mount Morgan is a rural town and locality in the Rockhampton Region, Queensland, Australia. The town was the administrative centre of the Mount Morgan Shire until March 2008, when it was amalgamated with neighbouring local government areas to form the Rockhampton Region.

In the 2021 census, the town of Mount Morgan had a population of 2,487 people, while the locality of Mount Morgan had a population of 2,018 people.

== Geography ==
The town of Mount Morgan is situated on the Dee River, 38 kilometres (24 mi) south of the city of Rockhampton, and is 680 kilometres (420 mi) north of the state capital, Brisbane. The Burnett Highway passes through the town.

There are a number of neighbourhoods within the locality:

- Gordon Vale (23.65°S 150.3833°E)
- Kenbula (23.6578°S 150.3706°E), located around the former Kenbula railway station
- Talban (23.6503°S 150.3758°E), located around the former Talban railway station

The names Kenbula and Talban were both assigned by the Queensland Railway Department on 18 November 1911. Both are Aboriginal names, Kenbula meaning ironbark tree and Talban meaning stone curlew.

== History ==
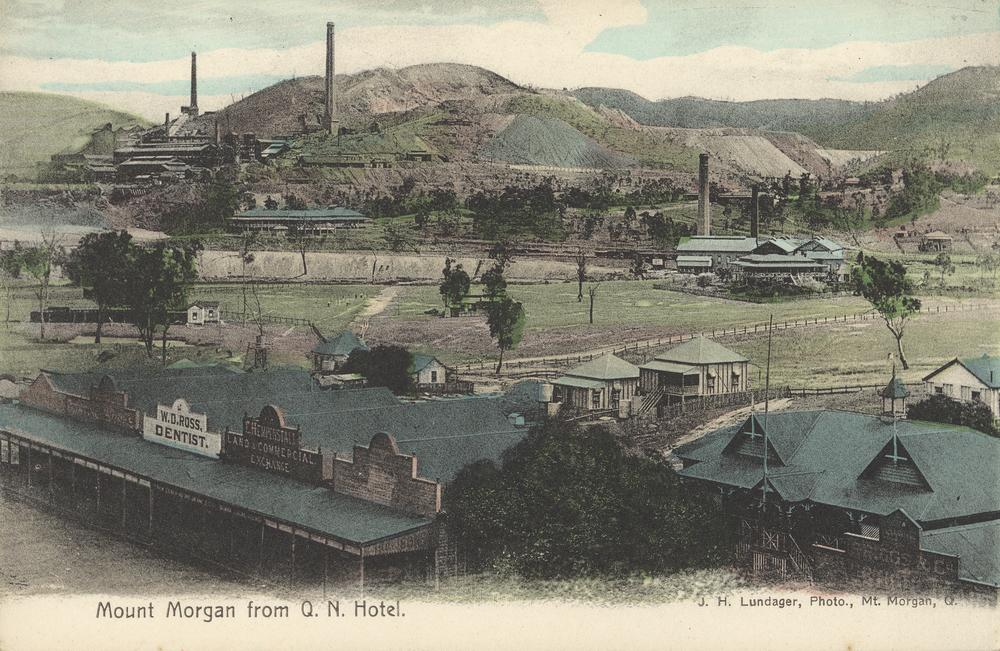
View of the town of Mount Morgan and the mine beyond from the Queensland National Hotel

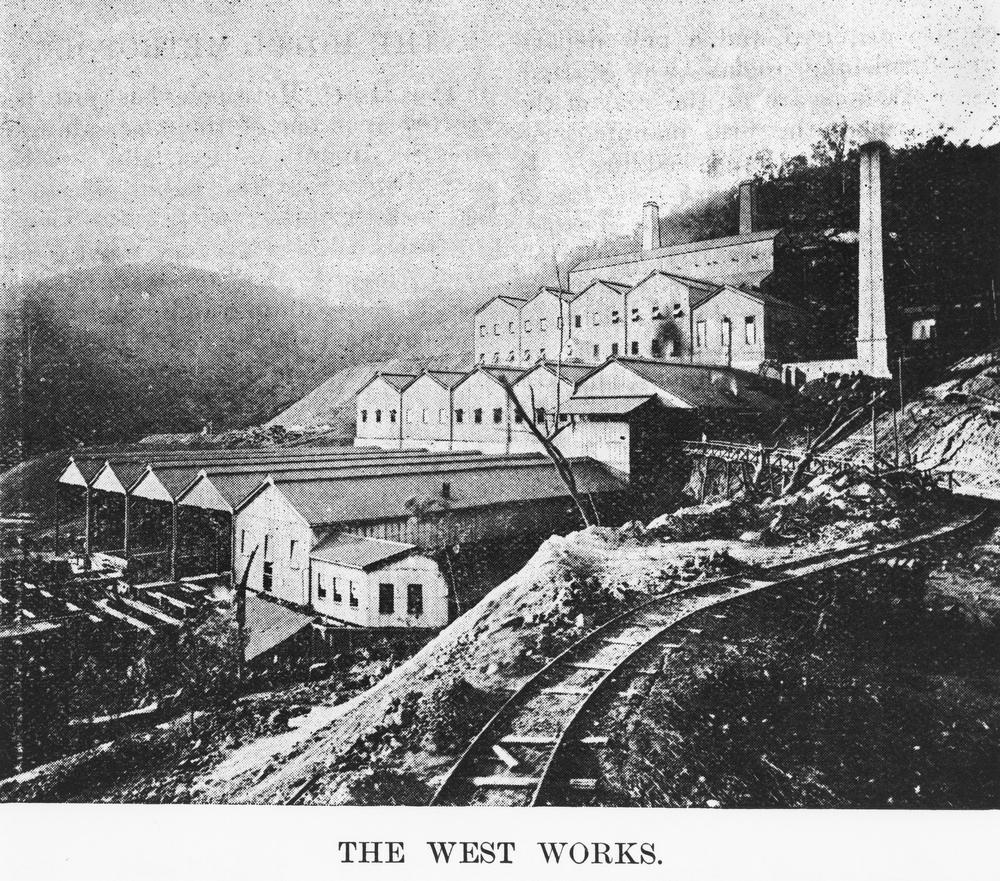
West works, Mt. Morgan, 1898

Prior to European migrants settling in the area, the area was part of the Kangulu peoples traditional lands.

Mount Morgan was founded as a gold mining town in 1882. The town takes its name from the family who took out the original gold mining leases in the area: Frederick Augustus Morgan and his brothers Thomas Squire Morgan and Edwin Francis Morgan.

Over the years, the Mount Morgan Mine has produced gold, silver and copper. Among those making a fortune from this mine was William Knox D'Arcy. D'Arcy used his fortune to finance oil exploration in Iran, which led to the formation of the Anglo-Persian Oil Company (now BP).

Mining of clay in a nearby hill for the production of furnace bricks commenced soon after that time, continuing until the early 1900s, The resulting man-made caves came to be known as the Fireclay Caverns, which contained large openings that measure between 4–12 metres in height from the cave floor. Dinosaur footprints (preserved as infills) were later found in nine different sections of the Fireclay Caverns, lining the ceiling dated to the Early Jurassic (Sinemurian).

Mount Morgan Post Office opened on 18 May 1885 (a receiving office had been open from 1884).

Mount Morgan Central State School opened in 1887 and grew so rapidly that it was separated into two schools on different sites the following year, forming Mount Morgan Boys State School and Mount Morgan Girls and Infants State School. The word 'Central' was added to the name of these two schools from 1911. They were amalgamated back into one school in 1929.

The town of Mount Morgan grew in a haphazard fashion around the entrance to the mining lease near the Dee River from the early 1880s. By 1889 a number of the major religions had established congregations and erected churches including the Primitive Methodists (1885), the Catholics (1887) and the Anglicans (1889). That year the town's name was formally changed from 'South Calliungal' to 'Mount Morgan', and by 1891 the Queensland census recorded a population of 3514.

Circa 1888-1889 an Anglican church opened in Mount Morgan.

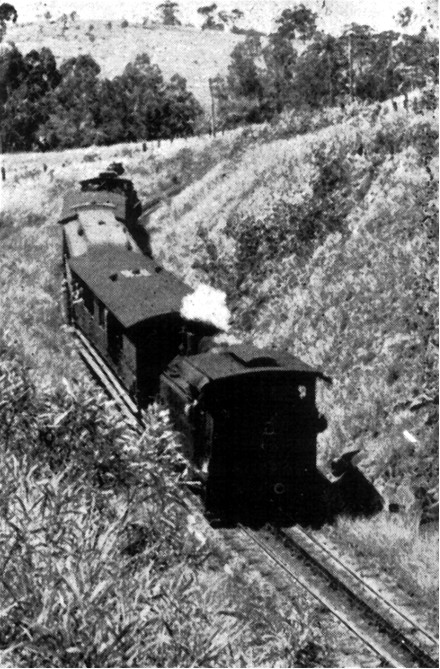
A rack train climbs towards Mount Morgan

Until the arrival of the railway in 1898, everything was transported by horse teams. The Mount Morgan Mining Company had a depot in Quay Street, where the wagoners would load up. Initially, there were two routes to Rockhampton, one via Crocodile (now Bouldercombe) and the other via Kabra, Boongarry and Moonmera. In 1885, a road was built over the Razorback Range.

The railway line between Mount Morgan and Rockhampton opened on 26 November 1898, with two railway stations serving the locality:

- Mount Morgan railway station, now abandoned (23.6392°S 150.3867°E)
- Walterhall railway station, now abandoned (23.6302°S 150.3876°E)

Like many Australian towns, in 1899 to 1900, the Siege of Mafeking was avidly followed in the news in Mount Morgan. With every confidence in a British victory, in March 1900, the town's people decided to prepare to celebrate the relief of Mafeking as soon as it was announced. The town band was to assemble immediately on the corner of East and Morgan Streets and other entertainments were arranged, such as a bonfire and a greasy pig. On 20 May 1900, on hearing the news of the relief of Mafeking, bonfires were lit on the hills around the town, the bands were playing, and patriotic speeches were made. The celebrations did not end there, as by November 1900, a "Mafeking" bell had been installed in a tower beside the town hall. The bell had been cast at the Mount Morgan Mine and weighed 7 cwt (360 kg). The sound of the bell was described as "blood curdling" and led to arguments as to whether the bell was cracked. By 1955, the wooden tower had rotted and the bell was taken down to be relocated to the verandah of the town hall. In 1969 the bell was relocated to the scout hall in Dee Street as the army leader at Mafeking was Lord Baden-Powell who established the Scouting movement in 1907. In February 2018, the bell was returned to the main street of Mount Morgan as part of a streetscape redevelopment project. There is a popular story that the schoolchildren of Mount Isa funded the bell by donating pennies (either to pay for it or to be melted down to construct it), but the earliest sources so far identified for this story are from 1955, 55 years after the bell was cast, and the commemorative plaque which also presents this story was not created until 1962.

Sacred Heart Catholic Primary School opened in 1891 and closed in 1997.

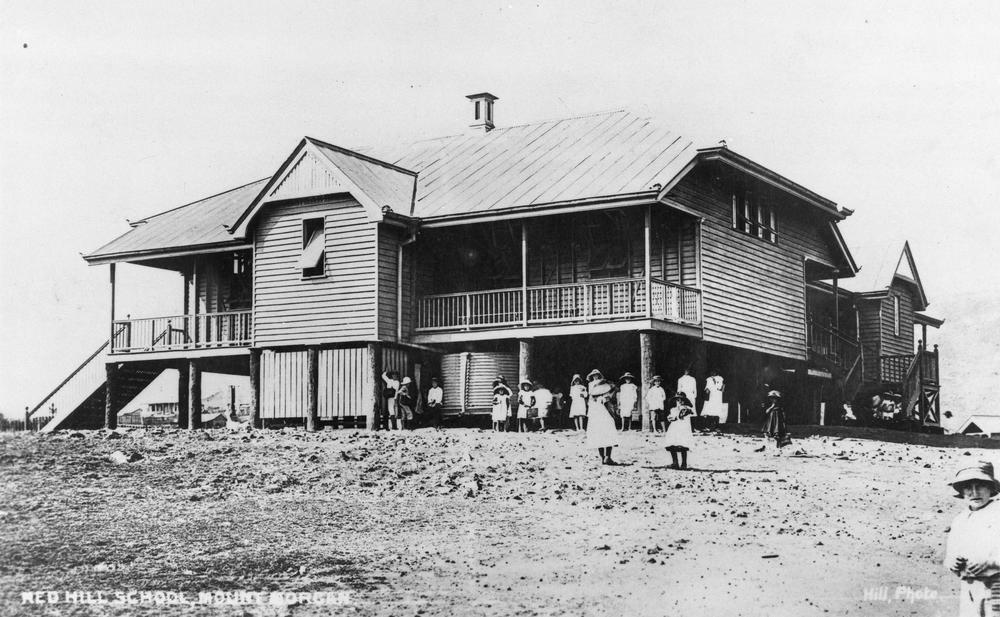
Red Hill State School, 1912

Red Hill State School opened in 1900 and closed circa 1931. It was in the Red Hill neighbourhood of Mount Morgan, and presumably is the origin of the name of School Street (approx 23.6529°S 150.3758°E).

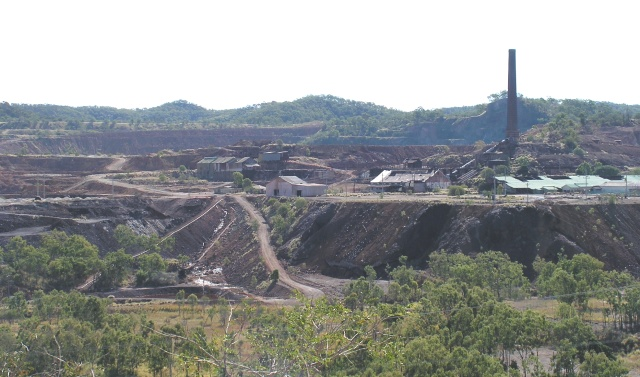
Mount Morgan minesite, 2005

In 1902, a Baptist church opened in Mount Morgan. Prior to the opening of the church, Baptist services had been held in the Forester's Hall. In April 1902 the Port Curtis Road Methodist Church building was purchased for removal and erected on the corner of East and Dee Streets in Mount Morgan. The stump-capping ceremony was held on Saturday 12 May 1902. The official opening of the church was on Sunday 22 June 1902.

Mount Morgan State High School opened on 22 January 1912. It was the first school of its kind to open in Queensland.

Maranu State School opened on 24 May 1915. It closed on 1 April 1927.

Upper Dee Provisional School opened in 1919. On 11 June 1923, it became Upper Dee State School. It closed circa 1929.

The Mount Morgan Mine finally closed in November 1990, having produced 250 tonnes of gold and 360,000 tonnes of copper during its lifetime, leaving 134 million tonnes of waste rock and tailings. During the mining operation, most of the mountain was mined away, and the town now lies adjacent to a 43 m deep acid-water filled pit. The Queensland Government have begun a rehabilitation project of the minesite.

The Mount Morgan Public Library opened in 1993.

In December 2020, a 24 kilometre mountain bike trail network was completed around No. 7 Dam, creating a new sporting facility for the area, as part of the Advancing Mount Morgan strategy with an aim to help boost tourism to the town.

In 2021, the town's water supply was so low, drinking water had to be delivered on daily basis.

== Demographics ==
In the 1891 census, the town of Mount Morgan had a population of 3,514 people.

In the 2006 census, the town of Mount Morgan had a population of 2,447.

In the 2011 census, the locality of Mount Morgan had a population of 2,115 people.

In the 2016 census, the locality of Mount Morgan had a population of 1,963 people.

In the 2021 census, the town of Mount Morgan had a population of 2,487 people, while the locality of Mount Morgan had a population of 2,018 people.

== Heritage listings ==
Mount Morgan has a number of heritage-listed sites, including:

- Burnett Highway: Mount Morgan Mine
- 4 Central Street: Mount Morgan State High School
- 39 Central Street: Grand Hotel
- East Street: Mount Morgan Cemetery
- 2 Gordon Street (23.6469°S 150.3863°E): Mount Morgan Masonic Temple
- 11 Gordon Street: St Mary's Anglican Church
- 28 Hall Street: Court House and Police Station
- Morgan Street: Coronation Lamp War Memorial
- 28 Morgan Street: Queensland National Hotel
- 31 Morgan Street: Mount Morgan School of Arts
- 38 Morgan Street: Commonwealth Bank Building
- 44 Morgan Street: Mount Morgan Central State School
- Railway Parade: Mount Morgan railway station
- Westwood/Oakey Creek: Adolphus William Copper Smelter

== Economy ==
Mining companies still prospect today in the area, and plans to extract further gold from tailings at the mine site are under development.

== Education ==
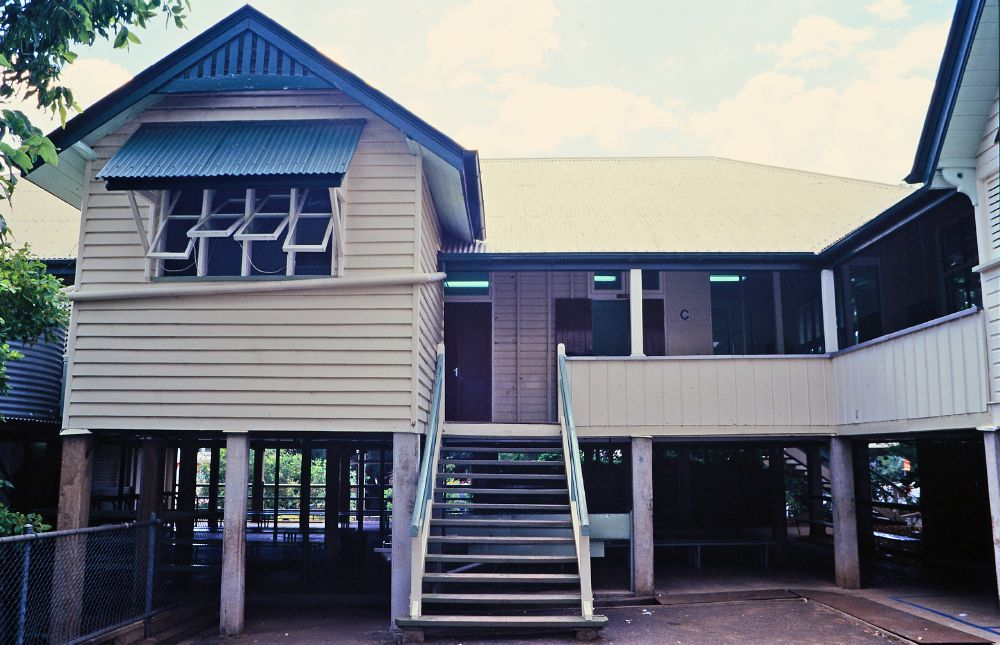
Mount Morgan Central State School, 2001

Mount Morgan Central State School is a government primary (Prep–6) school for boys and girls at 44 Morgan Street (23.6456°S 150.3880°E). In 2018, the school had an enrolment of 209 students with 15 teachers (12 full-time equivalent) and 13 non-teaching staff (10 full-time equivalent).

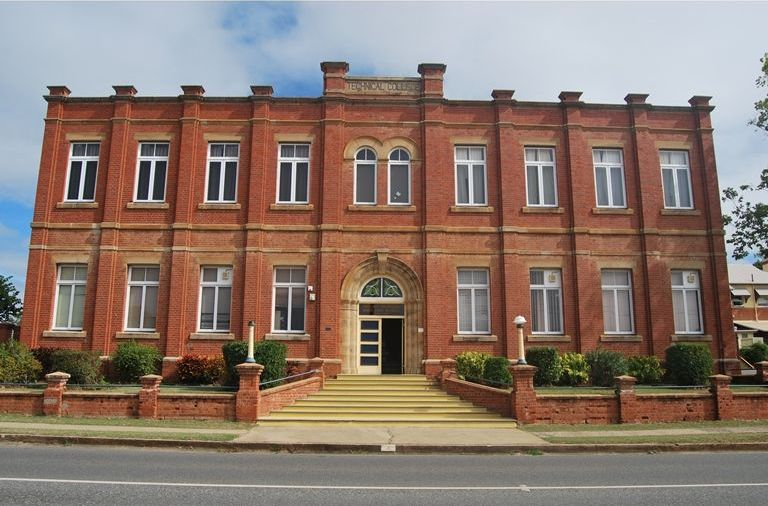
Mount Morgan State High School - former Technical College Building, from E (2015)

Mount Morgan State High School is a government secondary (7–12) school for boys and girls at 4 Central Street (23.6439°S 150.3873°E). In 2018, the school had an enrolment of 183 students with 21 teachers (20 full-time equivalent) and 17 non-teaching staff (12 full-time equivalent).

== Amenities ==
The Rockhampton Regional Council operates the Mount Morgan Library at 31 Morgan Street (23.6452°S 150.3866°E).

The Mount Morgan branch of the Queensland Country Women's Association meets at the CWA Hall at 127 East Street (23.6463°S 150.3898°E).

Mount Morgan Mountain Bike Trails are managed by Rockhampton Regional Council. Rockhampton Mountain Bike Club conducts social rides there and also has plans to commence racing at the new trail park in 2021.

There are a number of churches in Mount Morgan, including:

- St Mary's Anglican Church, 11 Gordon Street (23.6463°S 150.3866°E)
- Sacred Heart Catholic Church, 35A Hall Street (facing Gordon Street, 23.6469°S 150.3882°E)
- Mount Morgan Uniting Church, 86 East Street (corner Gordon Street, 23.6463°S 150.3893°E)
- St Enoch's Presbyterian Church, 78 East Street (23.6445°S 150.3893°E)
- Peace Christian Church (of the Peace Apostolic Ministries), 80 East Street (23.6439°S 150.3892°E); the building was formerly the Mount Morgan Baptist Church

== Events ==
Mount Morgan is known to hold the Golden Mount Festival in the main street at the end of April or the start of May as part of the Labour Day holiday. The festival usually starts on a Friday and finishes the next Monday. The Morgan Street is closed to vehicles during Saturday of the Festival for the day for markets and activities such as floats and "Running the Cutter" races.

== Attractions ==
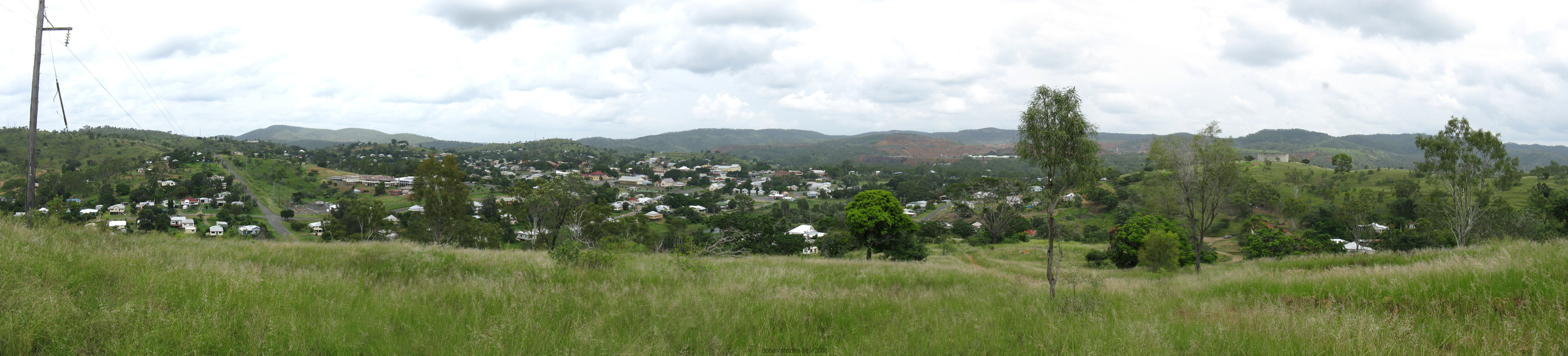
Panoramic Shot of Mount Morgan, 2008

Tourism plays a large part in the economy of the town today, with a visitor centre located at the old railway centre and recreation area at Dam No.7. The area was host to one of the few rack railways (as part of the line from Mount Morgan to Rockhampton) to operate in Australia. The rack portion of the line was replaced by a conventional adhesion railway in the 1950s, with a small portion of track retained at the town centre. In turn, the replacement line was closed in 1987, and the town no longer has a rail connection. The Mount Morgan railway station is still standing and now operates as a Museum and Tourist Information Centre. There is a regular bus service between Rockhampton, Gracemere and Mount Morgan provided by Young's Bus Service.

== Notable people ==
- Jens Hansen Lundager, mayor of Mount Morgan, editor of the Mount Morgan Argus, photographer
- Alma Moodie, German-based concert violinist and teacher
- Stephen Moore (rugby union), captain of the Wallabies, lived in Mount Morgan when his family first came to Queensland
- Mervyn Henry Stevenson, superintendent of the Townsville police district and inductee of the Australian Stockman's Hall of Fame

== Gallery ==
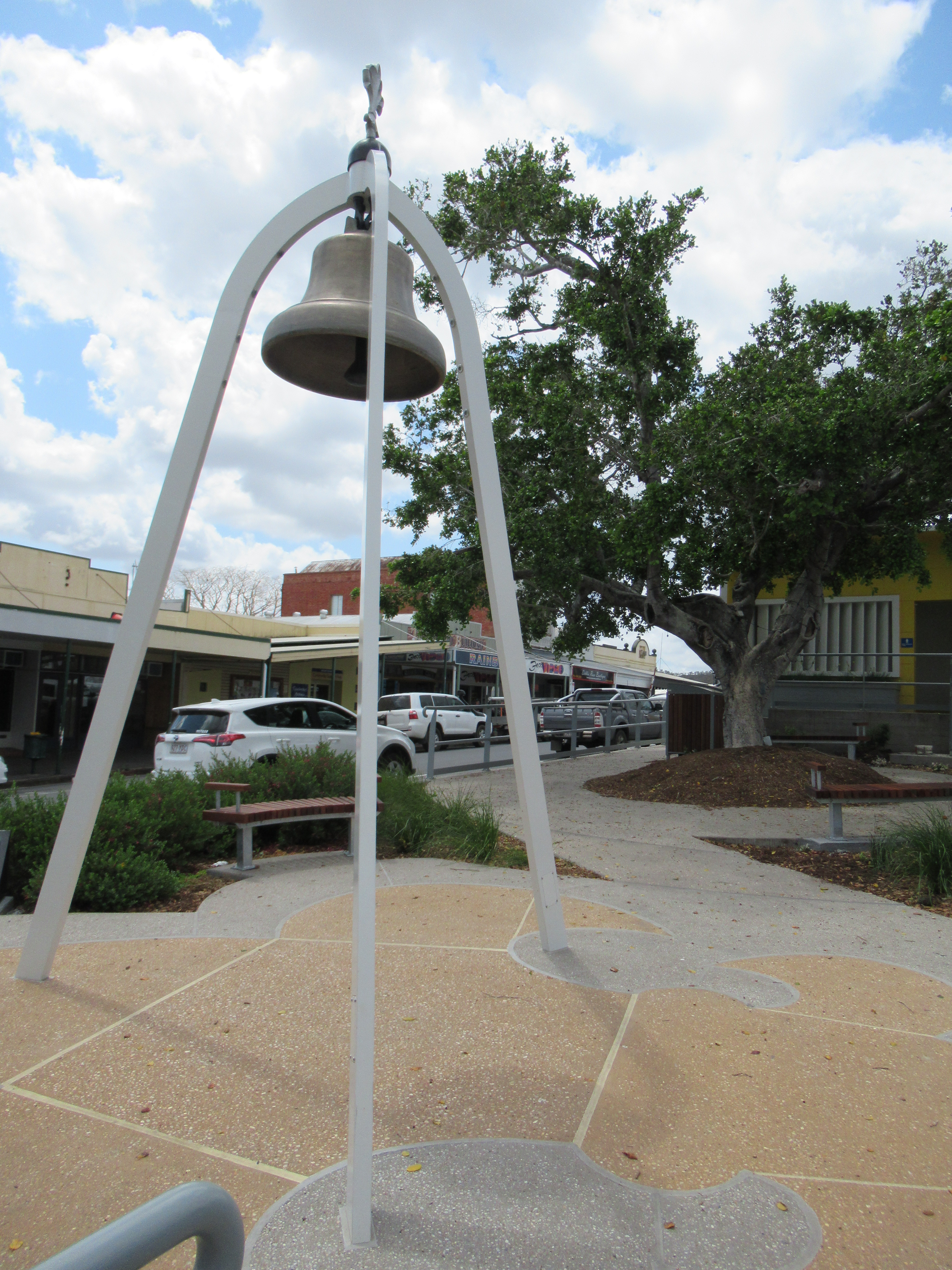
The Mafeking Bell in the main street of Mount Morgan, Queensland.

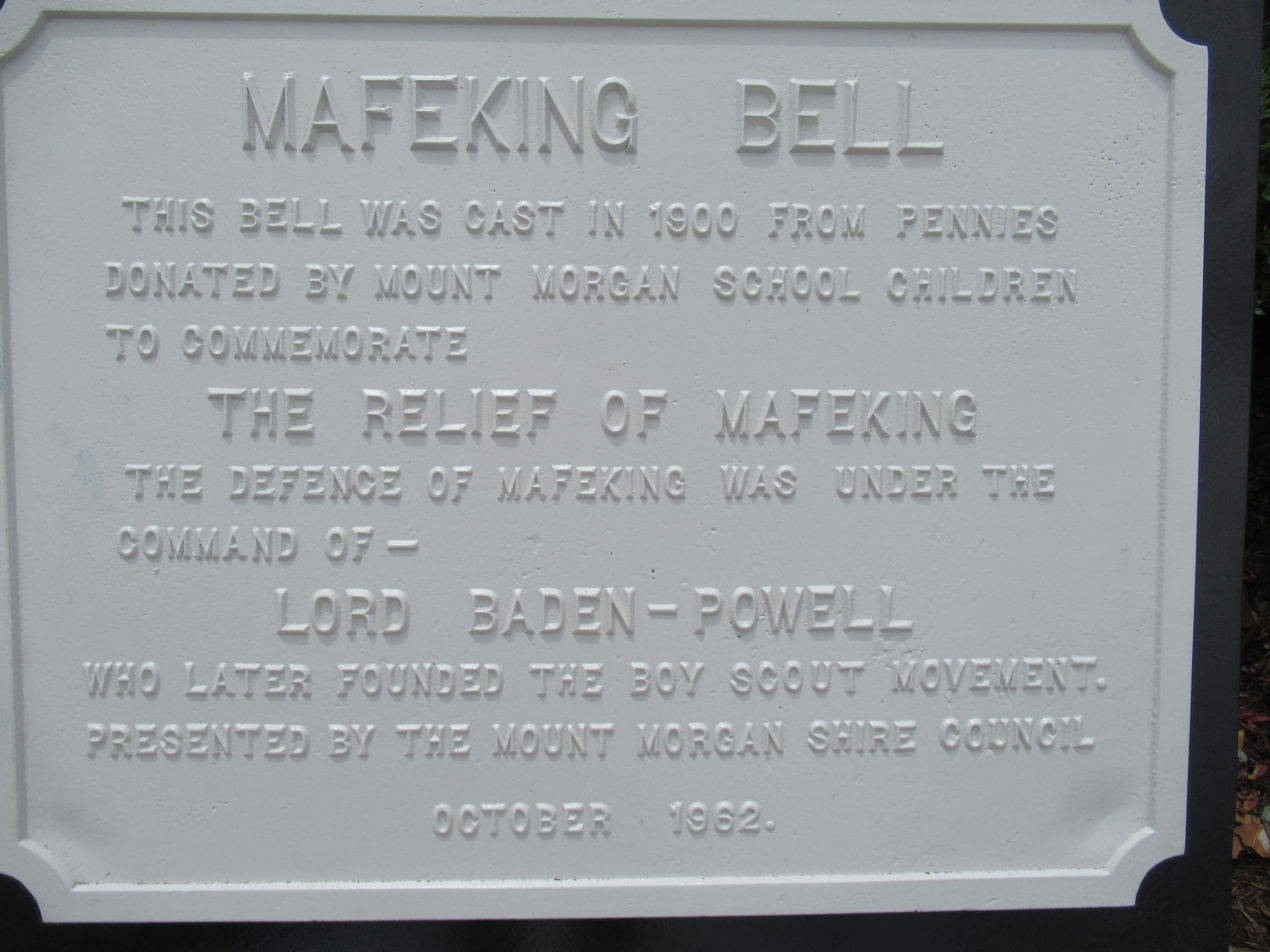
The Mafeking Bell Plaque

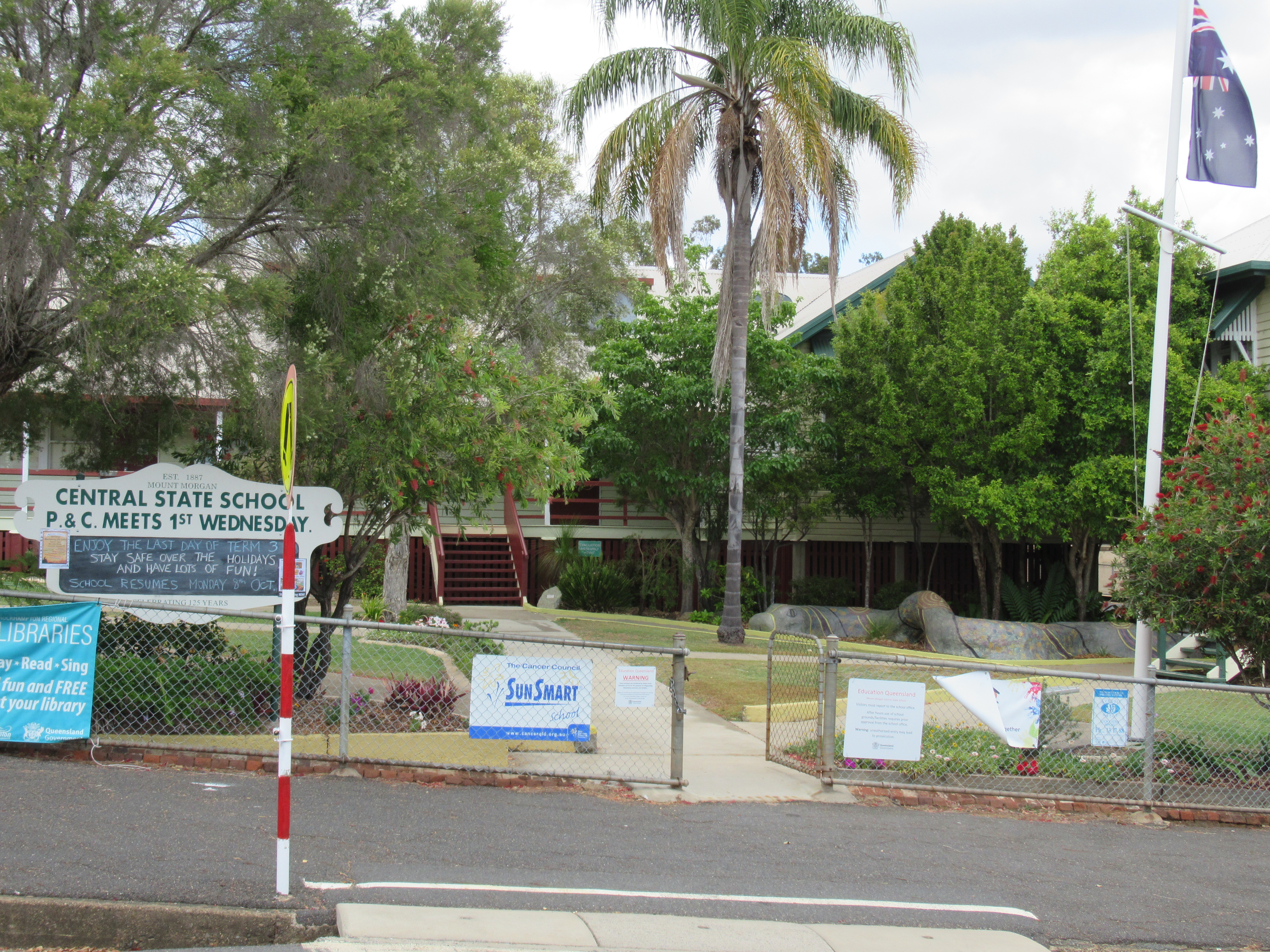
Mount Morgan Central State School, Mount Morgan, Queensland. It is a heritage-listed state school.

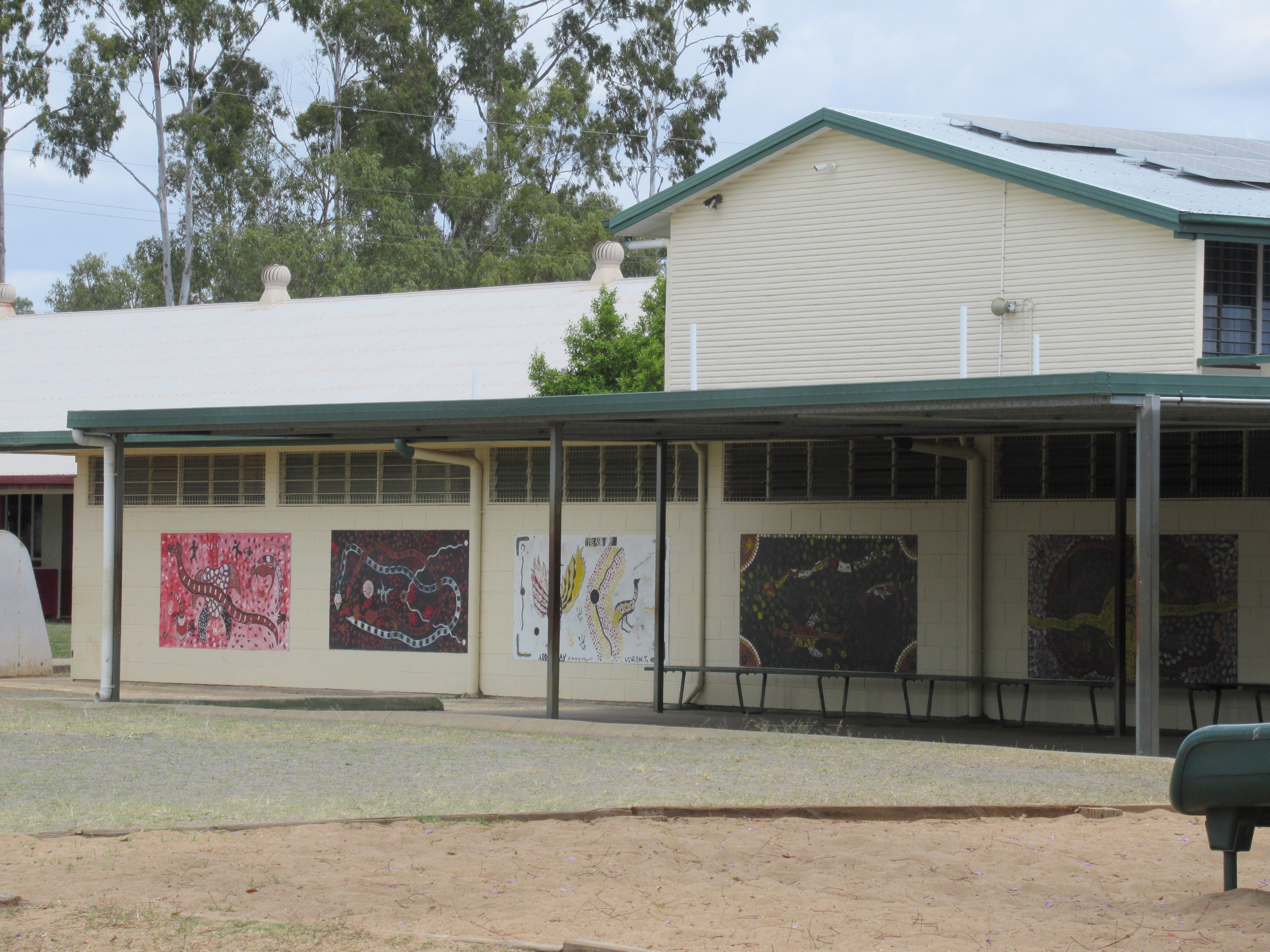
Murals at Mount Morgan Central State School, Mount Morgan, Queensland

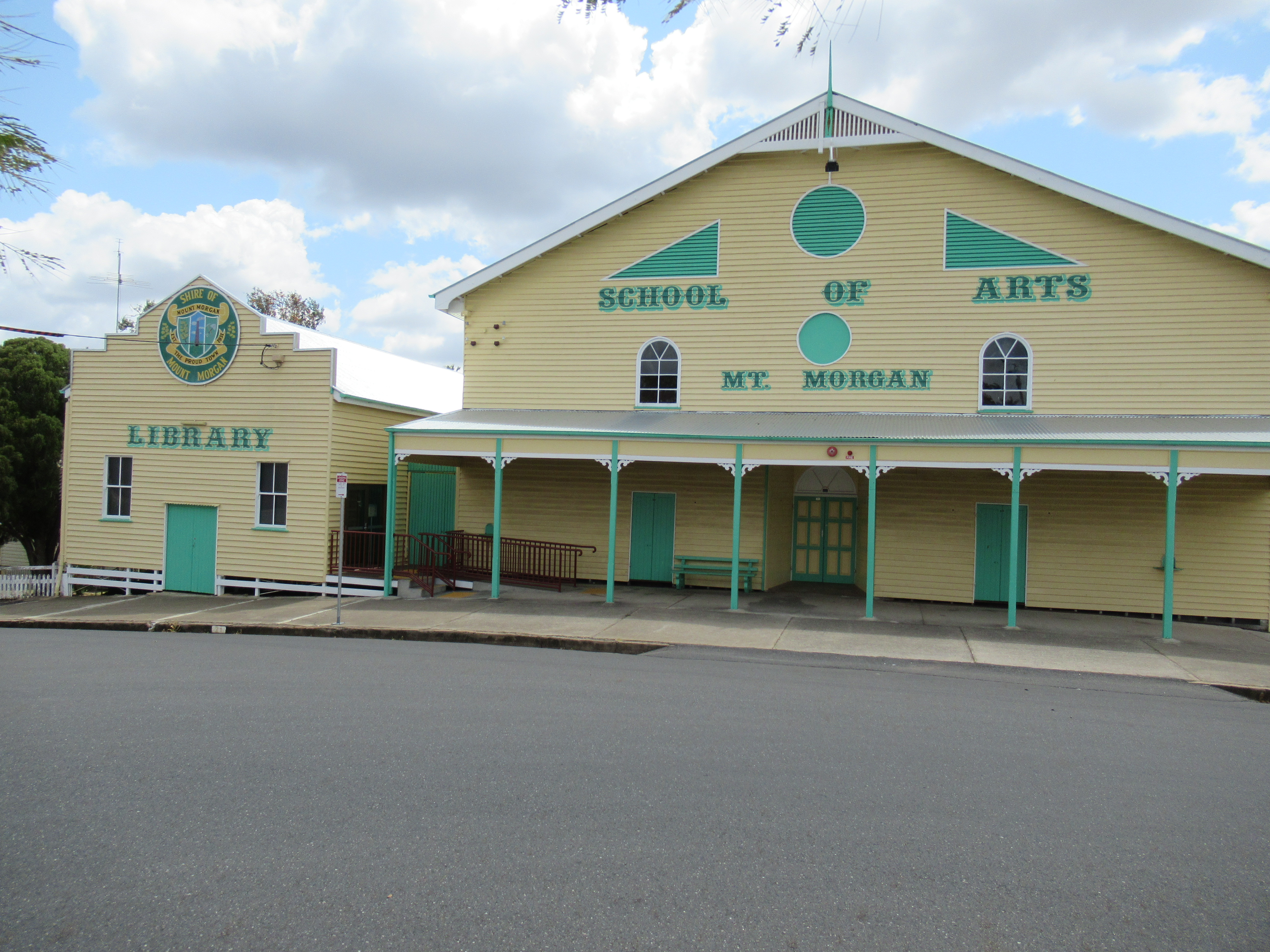
Mount Morgan School of Arts is heritage-listed

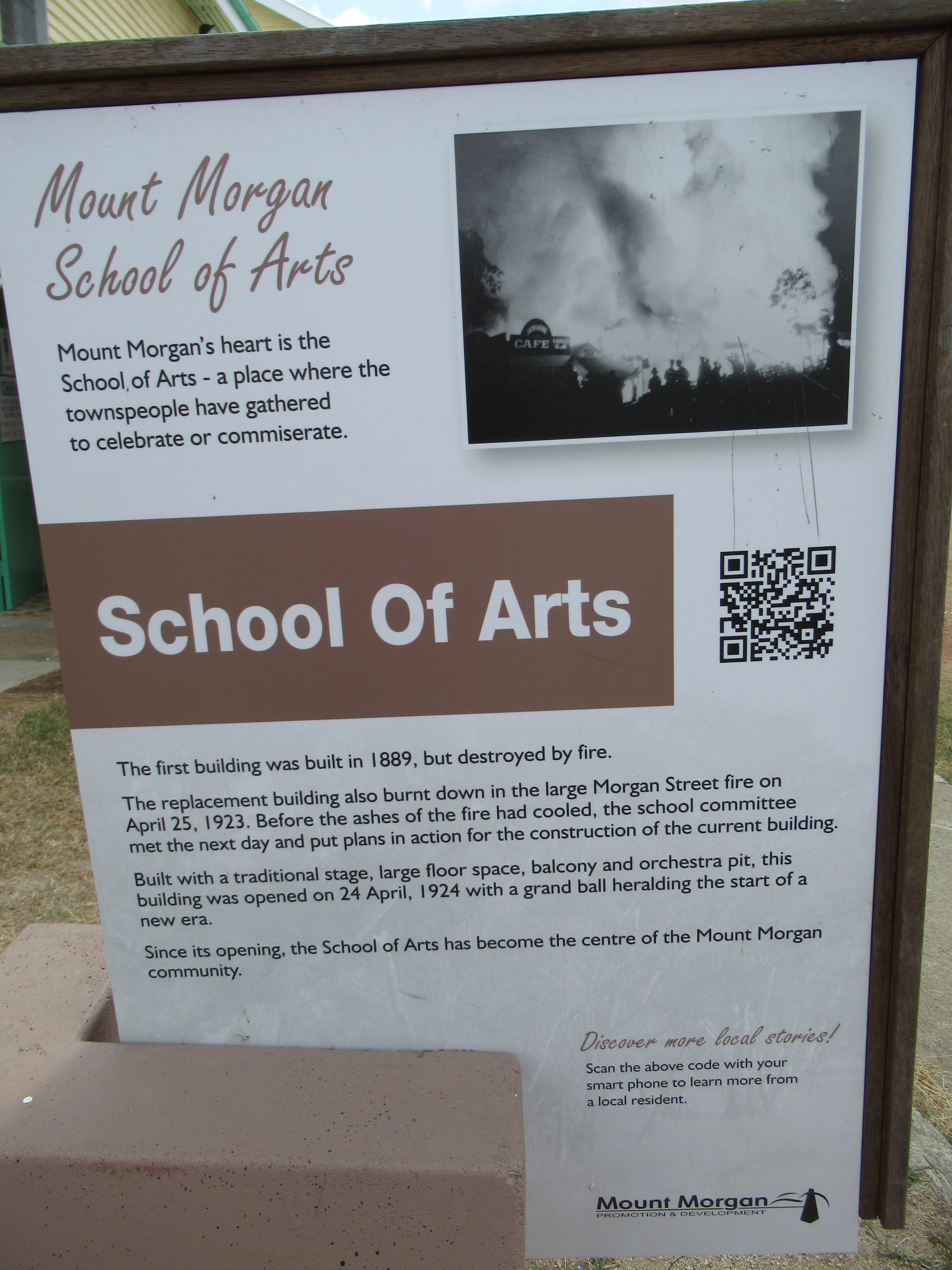
Mount Morgan School of Arts information sign

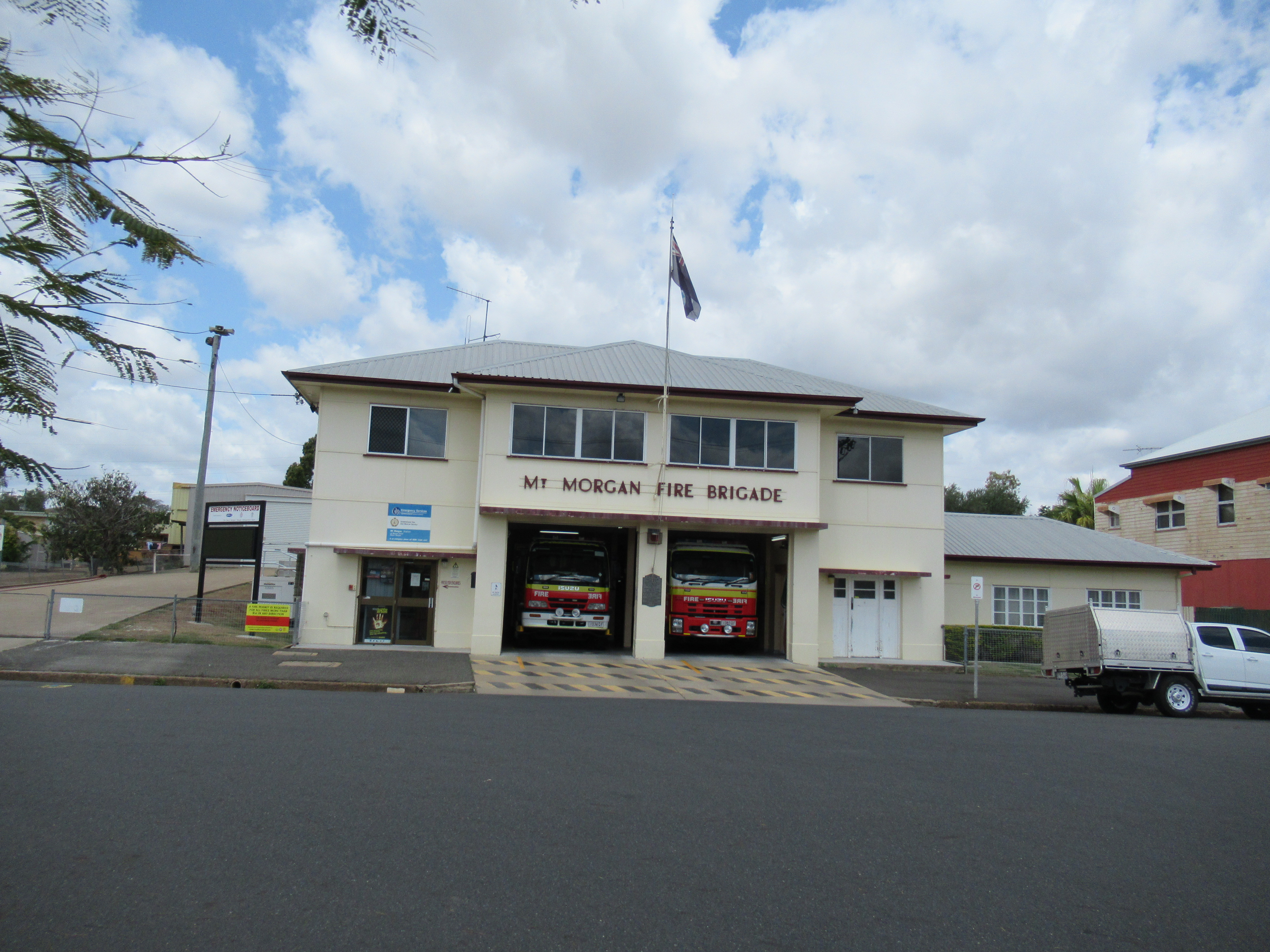
Fire Station, Mount Morgan, Queensland, Australia

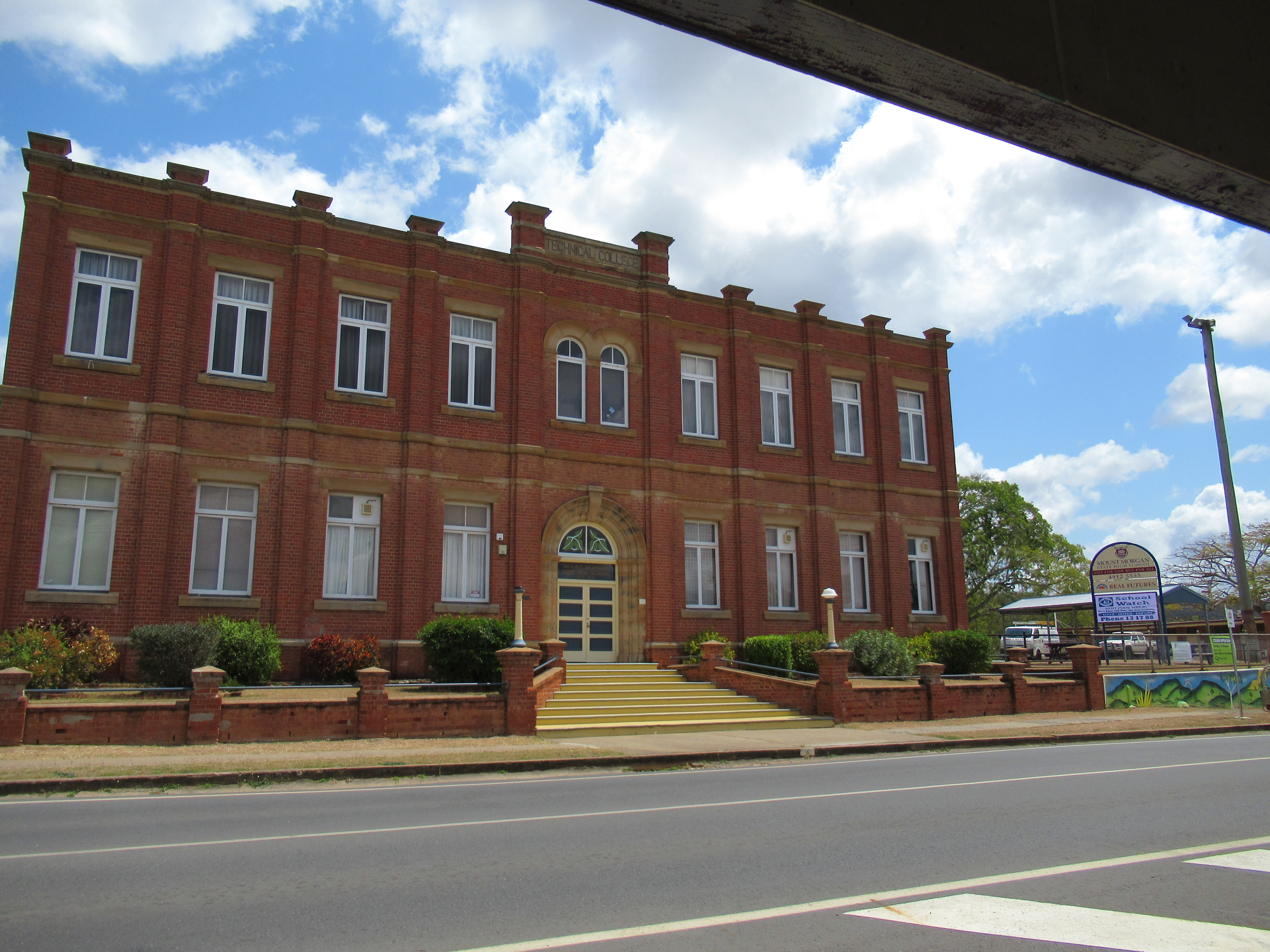
Mount Morgan State High School is a heritage-listed state high school

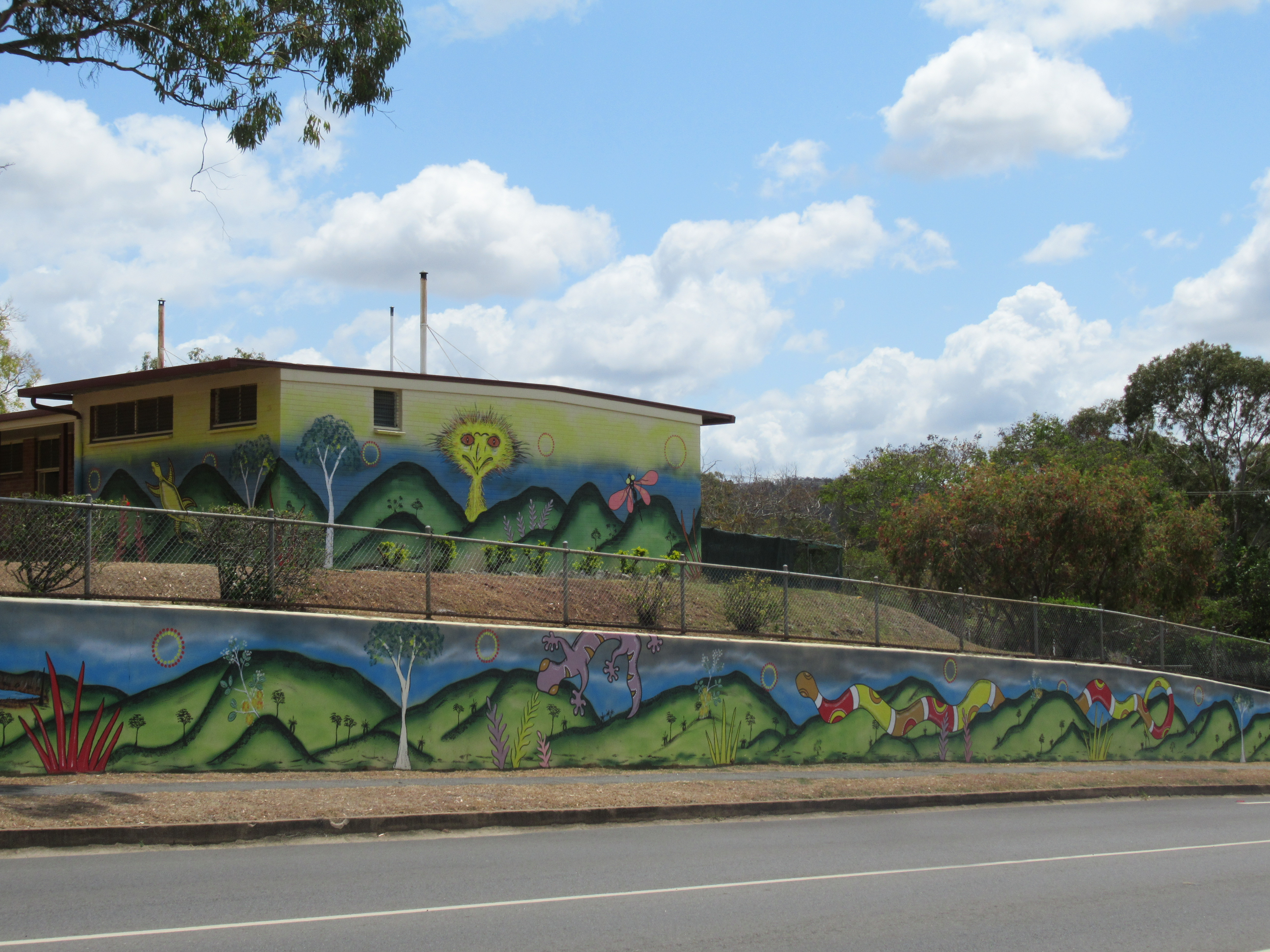
Murals at Mount Morgan State High School

== See also ==
- Mining in Australia
