= Mount Morgan School of Arts =

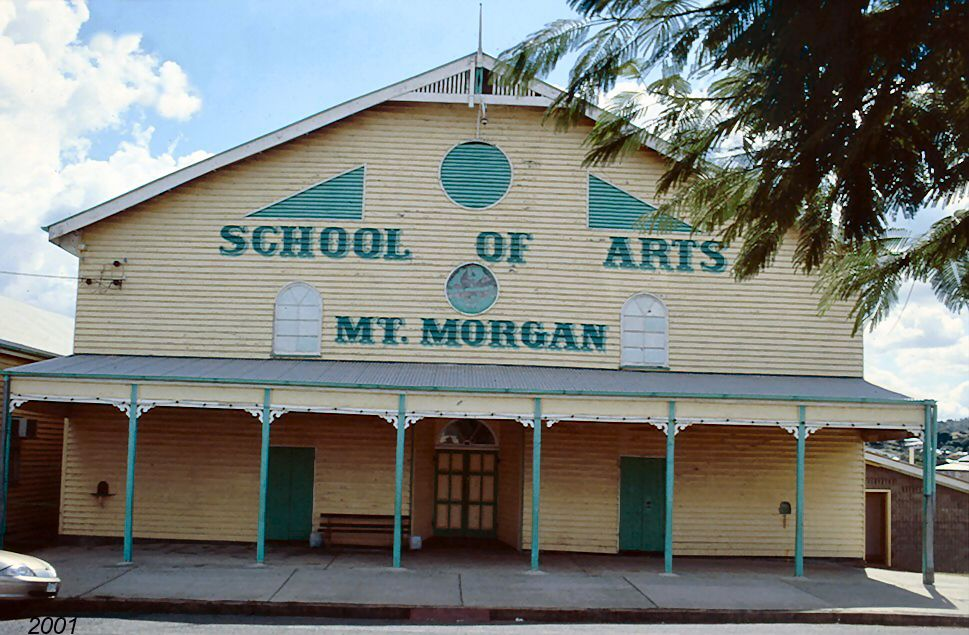
- Mount Morgan School of Arts Hall & Library, 2001

- Location within Queensland Location within Australia
- 23.645°S 150.3867°E
- Location: 31 Morgan Street, Mount Morgan, Rockhampton Region, Queensland, Australia

History
- Design period: 1870s–1890s (late 19th century)
- Built: 1924

Queensland Heritage Register
- Official name: School of Arts Hall & Library
- Type: state heritage (built)
- Designated: 21 October 1992
- Reference no.: 600749
- Significant period: 1920s (fabric); 1920s–1940s (historical); 1920s–1940s (social)
- Significant components: library – building, school of arts

Mount Morgan School of Arts is a heritage-listed school of arts at 31 Morgan Street, Mount Morgan, Rockhampton Region, Queensland, Australia. It was built in 1924. It was added to the Queensland Heritage Register on 21 October 1992.

== History ==
The School of Arts was opened in Mount Morgan in April 1924 and was the third School of Arts in the town, built following the demolition by fire of the previous building.

The township of Mount Morgan grew with the establishment of what was to become the richest gold mine in the world. Although small mining claims occurred before 1882, the three Morgan Brothers pegged claims which encompassed most of the mountain top in that year. In July they formed a partnership with three Rockhampton businessmen before selling out to them in 1886 when the Mount Morgan Gold Mining Company Limited was formed. The township quickly developed, establishing infrastructure for the rapidly increasing population. The company continued until 1929 when a new company and continued to produce gold and copper until it closed in 1990.

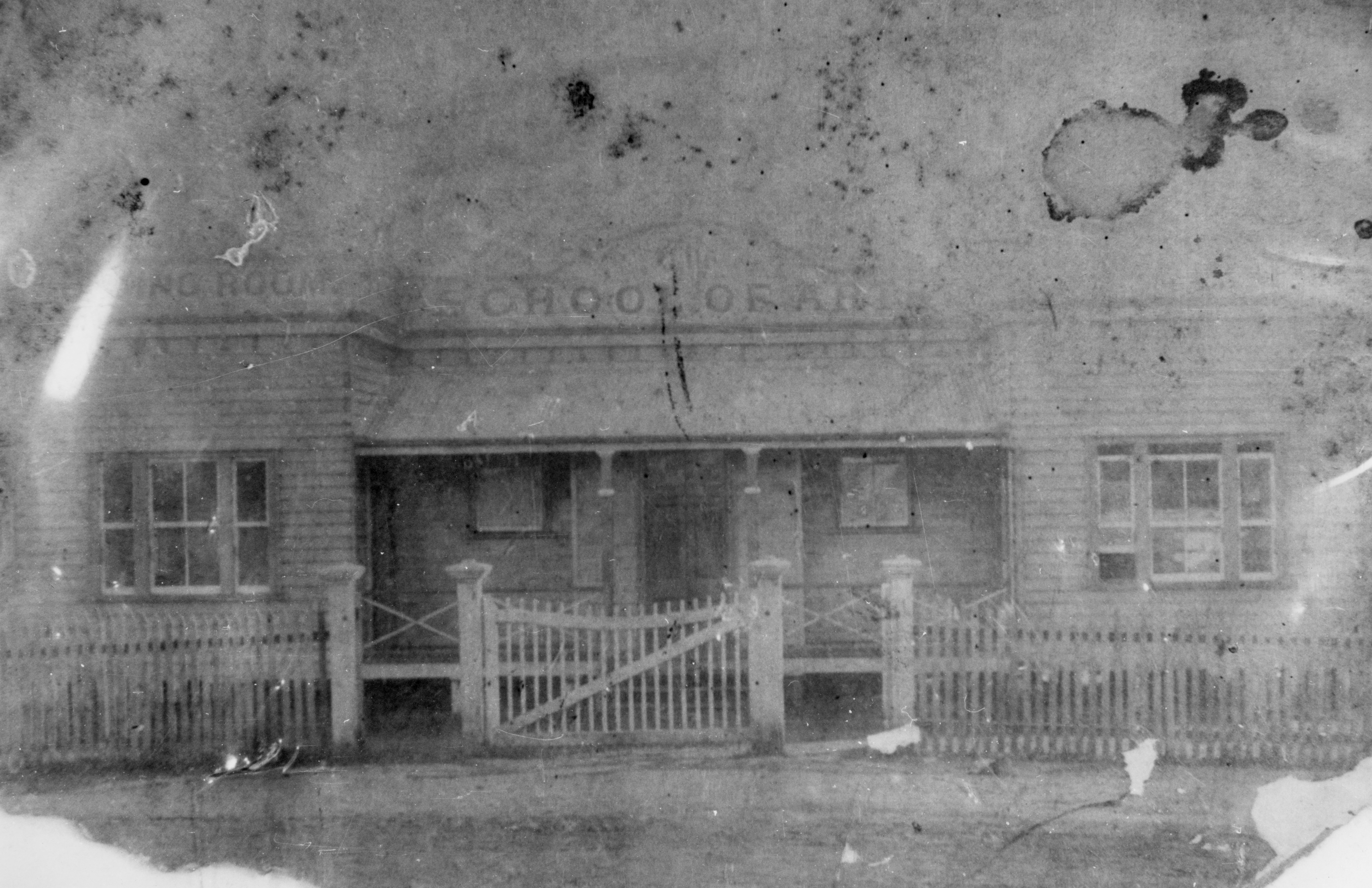
The first Mount Morgan School of Arts, circa 1890

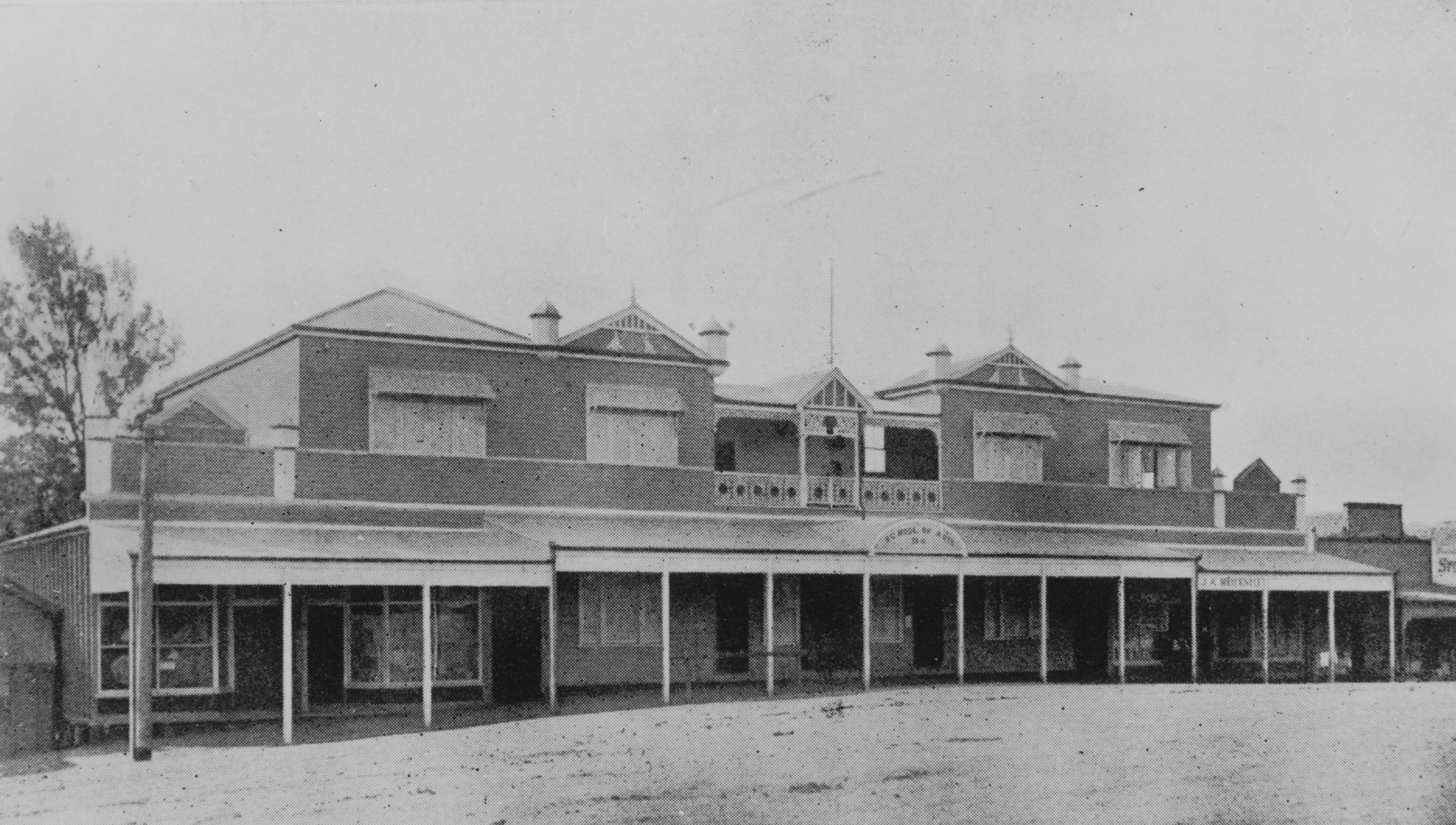
Second School of Arts building, circa 1910

A School of Arts was built in Mount Morgan in 1889 and opened on 11 September 1891. It was destroyed by fire. A School of Arts Reserve was proclaimed in 1895 and a new building was constructed but was also razed by fire on 25 April 1923. A special meeting of the School of Arts Committee was held in the Commonwealth Bank on 26 April 1923 to discuss the erection of another building. The library of the School of Arts was re-opened in St Mary's Institute which was leased by the School of Arts Committee, with books imported from London by the Mount Morgan Mine Manager, Adam Alexander Boyd.

The School of Arts Committee decided to approach Mr Boyd about the rebuilding of the School of Arts and he agreed that his Company would supply plans for the building. Tenders were called but both tenders submitted were rejected on the basis of price. It was suggested that construction by day labour would reduce costs and the building was eventually erected on this basis by W. Butcher and R.A Ames. The cost was largely covered by a loan of £3000 from the Queensland Government.

The library and reading room were completed and opened to the public on 24 April 1924, the hall itself was opened with a Grand Ball held on 20 August 1924. The hall has been used for a wide variety of purposes, including the screening of films, balls, theatrical performances and most large scale public events occurring in the town. During World War II, American soldiers stationed at Rockhampton used the place for accommodation and recreation.

Extensive refurbishment was undertaken in 2011 by the Rockhampton Regional Council which now manages the building.

== Description ==
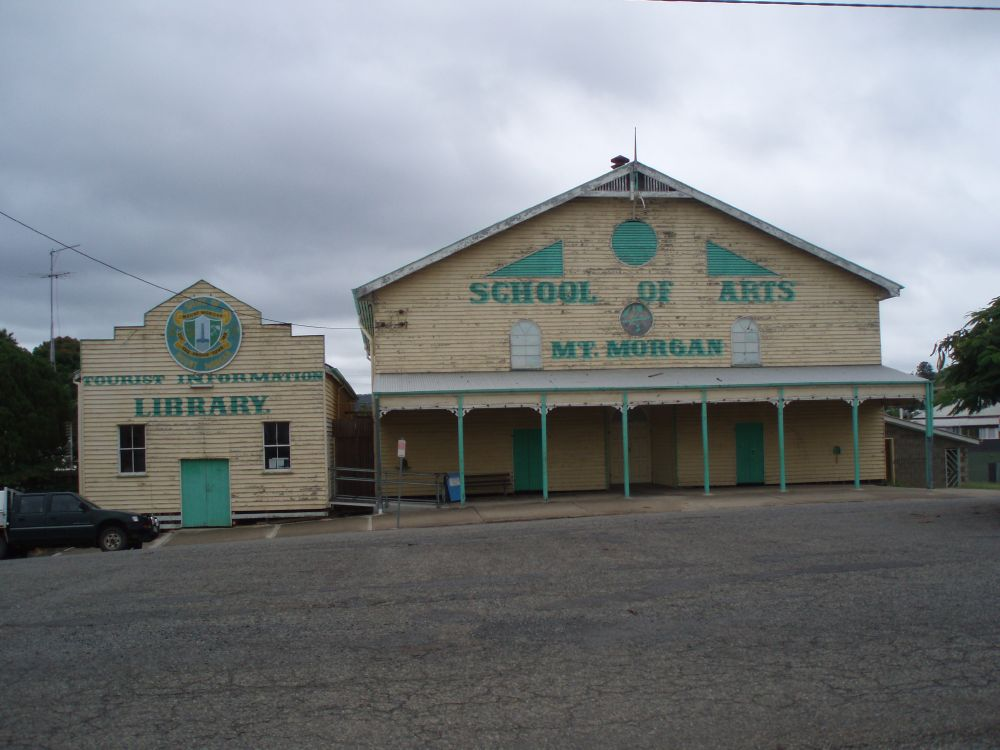
Mount Morgan School of Arts Hall & Library, 2002

The Mount Morgan School of Arts comprises two rectangular timber buildings with gabled roofs set on stumps: a very large hall and an adjacent library of more modest scale, parallel to each other and connected by a timber walkway secured by a gate at either end. The buildings are across the road from the former Queensland National Hotel and are separated by a large vacant block from the Grand Hotel.

The roof of the hall is divided into two sections. The stage end of the building is elevated from the principal roof line and reflects the internal space required by a fly tower for raising and lowering scenery. There is an awning to the street supported on timber posts with fretwork brackets linked by a decorative frieze panel. Above the awning in a symmetrical arrangement are large circular and triangular openings filled with fixed timber louvres and two round arched windows. There is a central recessed entrance door flanked by two smaller entrances. On the side of the hall away from the library a small verandah runs along the building in front of the crash doors. A modern toilet block constructed of concrete blocks with a corrugated iron roof adjoins the building. The under stage area at the rear is now used as a child care centre.

The hall interior is a large rectangular space with exposed beams and a timber floor. It is lit by louvred windows in the side walls that also have four sets of crush doors. There is a stage at one end with provision for scenery and a small orchestra pit. The proscenium arch is sheeted with decorative pressed metal. On either side of the front entrance doors are internal stairs that lead up to a large dress circle with a raked floor. This has fold up seating and a projection box which is now empty. Beneath the staircases and extending slightly into the hall are two small ticket boxes. To the right of the main entrance there is a large curved snack bar counter with a laminex top incorporating a small refrigerated showcase. The walls below the gallery are lined with horizontal beaded timber boards and those to the main part of the hall are lined with fibrous cement sheeting.

The School of Arts Library is a simple rectangular building clad with weatherboard. At the front the roof is concealed by a stepped parapet. The central street entrance is flanked by a pair of sash windows. The rear and sides of the building have windows of a domestic scale shaded by sunhoods. It is in currently use as the Municipal library and tourist information centre.

== Heritage listing ==
The Mount Morgan School of Arts was listed on the Queensland Heritage Register on 21 October 1992 having satisfied the following criteria.

The place is important in demonstrating the evolution or pattern of Queensland's history.

The Mount Morgan School of Arts hall and library are important elements in the network of Schools of Arts which sprang up in any town of consequence in Queensland during the nineteenth and early twentieth centuries. They were community based and played a valuable educational and social role in the dissemination of information and the provision of facilities for lectures, meetings, games of skill and the staging of community events such as balls, plays and concerts.

The place is important in demonstrating the principal characteristics of a particular class of cultural places.

They are good examples of School of Arts buildings comprising a hall and library and designed to provide the facilities for a wide range of community cultural events and needs, the large size of the hall demonstrating the size and importance of Mount Morgan in the 1920s.

The place is important because of its aesthetic significance.

The buildings are a significant as part of the townscape of Mount Morgan because of its scale and location close to the town centre.

The place has a strong or special association with a particular community or cultural group for social, cultural or spiritual reasons.

The School of Arts is important for its connection with the community of Mount Morgan as an integral part of the social and community life of the town.
