= Shire of Mount Morgan =

Coordinates: 23°38′40.21″S 150°23′14.39″E

- Local government area
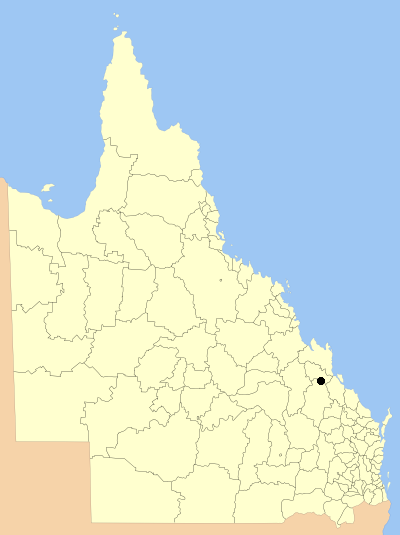
- Location within Queensland

- Country: Australia
- State: Queensland
- Region: Capricornia
- Established: 1890
- Council seat: Mount Morgan

Area
  - Total: 492.0 km^{2} (190.0 sq mi)

Population
  - Total: 2,925 (2006 census)
  - Density: 5.9451/km^{2} (15.398/sq mi)
- Website: Shire of Mount Morgan
LGAs around Shire of Mount Morgan
Fitzroy	Fitzroy	Fitzroy
Banana	Shire of Mount Morgan	Fitzroy
Banana	Banana	Banana

The Shire of Mount Morgan was a local government area located in the Capricornia region of Central Queensland, Queensland, Australia, about 20 kilometres (12 mi) south of the regional city of Rockhampton. The shire, roughly the region surrounding the former gold mining town of Mount Morgan, covered an area of 492.0 square kilometres (190.0 sq mi), and existed as a local government entity from 1890 until 2008, when it amalgamated with several other councils to become the Rockhampton Region.

== History ==
Mount Morgan came into being with the discovery of gold in the area in 1882. It was established as the Borough of Mount Morgan on 22 May 1890, becoming the Town of Mount Morgan on 31 March 1903 with the enactment of the Local Authorities Act 1902. On 17 March 1909, the surrounding area, previously part of the Shire of Banana, was incorporated as the Shire of Calliungal, which had its offices in Mount Morgan. On 5 November 1931, the two merged to form the Shire of Mount Morgan.

On 15 March 2008, under the Local Government (Reform Implementation) Act 2007 passed by the Parliament of Queensland on 10 August 2007, the Shire of Mount Morgan merged with the City of Rockhampton and the Shires of Livingstone and Fitzroy to form the Rockhampton Region.

== Towns and localities ==
The Shire of Mount Morgan included the following settlements:

- Mount Morgan
- Baree
- Hamilton Creek
- Horse Creek
- Moongan
- The Mine
- Walterhall

== Chairmen and Mayors ==
=== Shire of Calliungal ===
- 1927: Francis Sylvester Cunningham

=== Town of Mount Morgan ===
- 1906: J. H. Lundager
- D. Whitehead

=== Shire of Mount Morgan ===
- 1931–1933: Henry Searle
- 1933–1942: Michael Enright
- 1942–1947: Alexander Edward Holt
- 1947–1970: James Griffin Carmody
- 1970–198?: Arthur David Timms OAM
- 2000–2004: Stanley George Lean OAM OAM
- 2004–2008: Gavin Finch

== Population ==
Year	Population
1933	4,404
1947	4,954
1954	5,060
1961	4,871
1966	4,421
1971	3,967
1976	3,467
1981	3,136
1986	3,108
1991	3,093
1996	2,858
2001	2,776
2006	2,925
