= Shire of Fitzroy =

Coordinates: 23°26′12.16″S 150°27′21.26″E

- Local government area
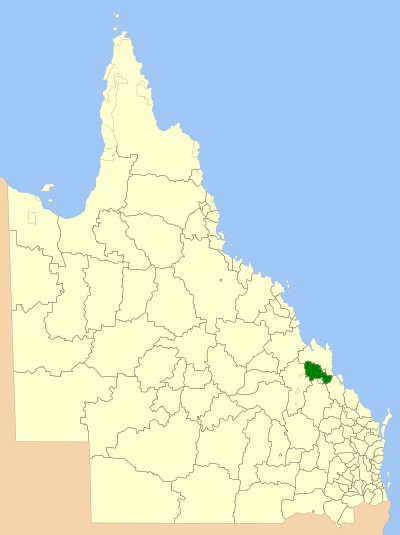
- Location within Queensland

- Country: Australia
- State: Queensland
- Region: Capricornia
- Established: 1899
- Council seat: Gracemere

Area
  - Total: 5,898.7 km^{2} (2,277.5 sq mi)

Population
  - Total: 10,310 (2006 census)
  - Density: 1.7478/km^{2} (4.5269/sq mi)
- Website: Shire of Fitzroy
LGAs around Shire of Fitzroy
Livingstone	Livingstone	Livingstone
Duaringa	Shire of Fitzroy	Rockhampton
Banana	Mount Morgan	Calliope

The Shire of Fitzroy was a local government area located in the Capricornia region of Central Queensland, Queensland, Australia, to the immediate west and south of the regional city of Rockhampton. The shire, administered from the town of Gracemere, covered an area of 5,898.7 square kilometres (2,277.5 sq mi), and existed as a local government entity from 1899 until 2008, when it amalgamated with several other councils to become the Rockhampton Region. It is named for the Fitzroy River, that passes along the northern boundary of the shire.

== History ==
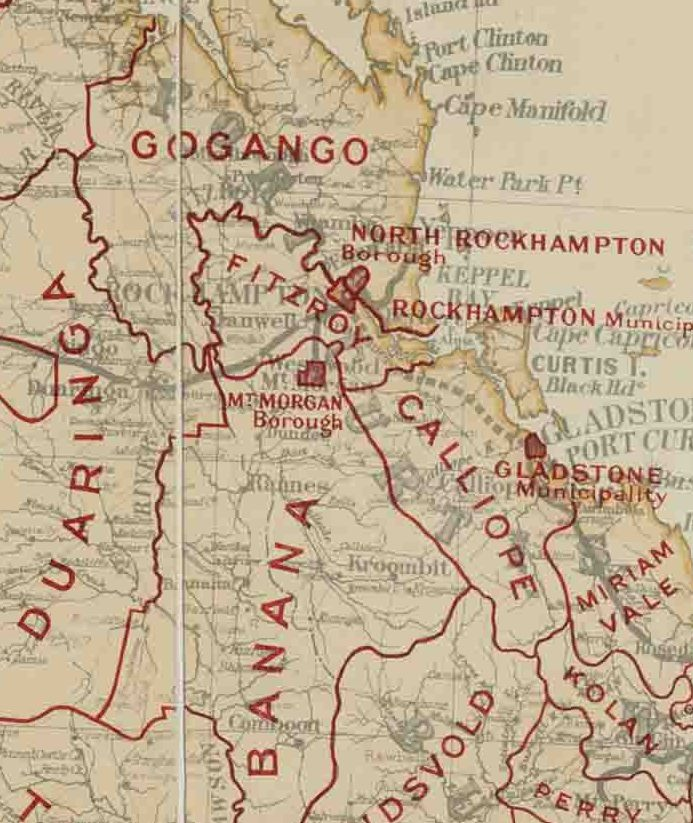
Map of Fitzroy Division and adjacent local government areas, March 1902

On 11 November 1879, the Gogango Division was established as one of 74 divisions around Queensland under the Divisional Boards Act 1879. On 6 April 1899, the section of Gogango south of the Fitzroy River split away to form the Fitzroy Division.

With the passage of the Local Authorities Act 1902, Fitzroy Division became the Shire of Fitzroy on 31 March 1903.

On 15 March 2008, under the Local Government (Reform Implementation) Act 2007 passed by the Parliament of Queensland on 10 August 2007, the Shire of Fitzroy merged with the City of Rockhampton and the Shires of Mount Morgan and Livingstone to form the Rockhampton Region.

At the time of amalgamation, the Shire of Fitzroy was the only local government area in Queensland without a library service.

== Towns and localities ==
The Shire of Fitzroy included the following settlements:

- Gracemere
- Alton Downs
- Bajool
- Bouldercombe
- Bushley
- Dalma
- Garnant
- Glenroy
- Gogango
- Kabra
- Kalapa
- Marmor
- Midgee
- Morinish
- Morinish South
- Nine Mile
- Pink Lily
- Port Alma
- Ridgelands
- Stanwell
- Westwood
- Wycarbah

== Chairmen ==
- 1899: Thomas Richard Avalon Creed
- 1903: William Wells
- 1913: Michael Leahy
- 1908; 1918; 1924–1930: John Walsh O'Shanesy
- 1930–1933: Edward Walker Archer
- 1933–1936: John Henry Salmon
- 1936–1943: John Beck
- 1943–1949: John Gay O'Shanesy
- 1949–1975: Richard (Richie) Edward Pierce (died in office)
- 1975–1982; 1988–1994; 1997–2000: Ian Besch
- 1982–1985: Robert Cedric Mackenzie Archer
- 1994–1997: Mary Lilliendal Seierup
- 2000–2004: Donald Edward Close
- 2004–2008: John Hopkins

== Population ==
Year	Population
1933	4,256
1947	3,773
1954	3,554
1961	3,576
1966	3,590
1971	3,434
1976	3,441
1981	4,645
1986	6,406
1991	8,047
1996	9,499
2001	9,553
2006	10,310
