= Kalapa, Queensland =

Kalapa
- Suburb
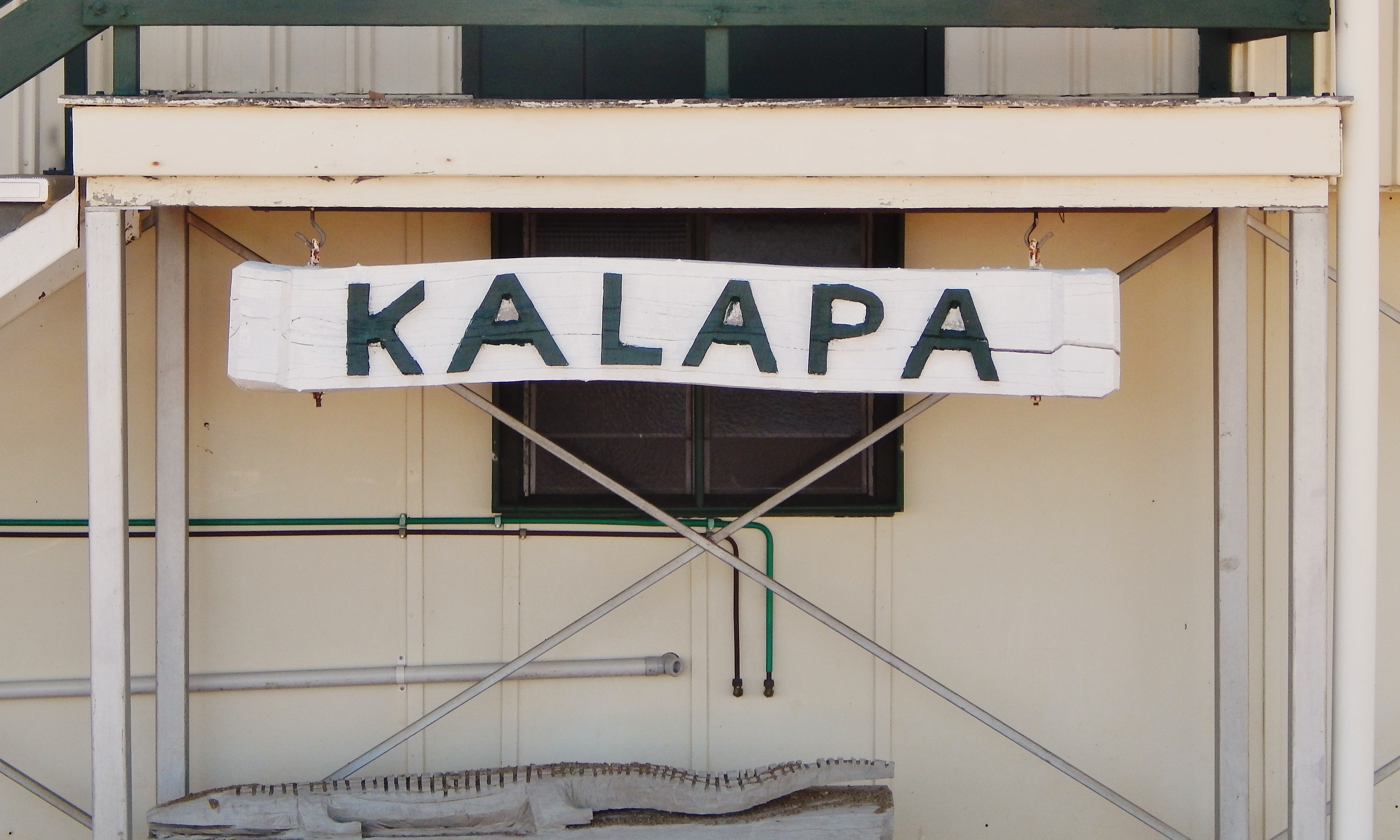

- Interactive map of Kalapa
- Coordinates: 23.4525°S 150.205°E
- Country: Australia
- State: Queensland
- LGA: Rockhampton Region
- Location: 23.1 km (14.4 mi) W of Stanwell; 48.5 km (30.1 mi) WSW of Rockhampton CBD; 669 km (416 mi) NNW of Brisbane

Government
  - State electorate: Mirani
  - Federal division: Flynn

Area
  - Total: 161.8 km^{2} (62.5 sq mi)

Population
  - Total: 97 (2021 census)
  - Density: 0.600/km^{2} (1.553/sq mi)
- Time zone: UTC+10:00 (AEST)
- Postcode: 4702
Suburbs around Kalapa
Morinish	Dalma	Stanwell
Morinish South	Kalapa	Stanwell
Wycarbah	Wycarbah	Bushley

Kalapa is a rural locality in the Rockhampton Region, Queensland, Australia. In the 2021 census, Kalapa had a population of 97 people.

== History ==
Originally known as Woodend, the name was officially changed to Kalapa in 1923 to avoid confusion with other communities of the same name, such as Woodend.

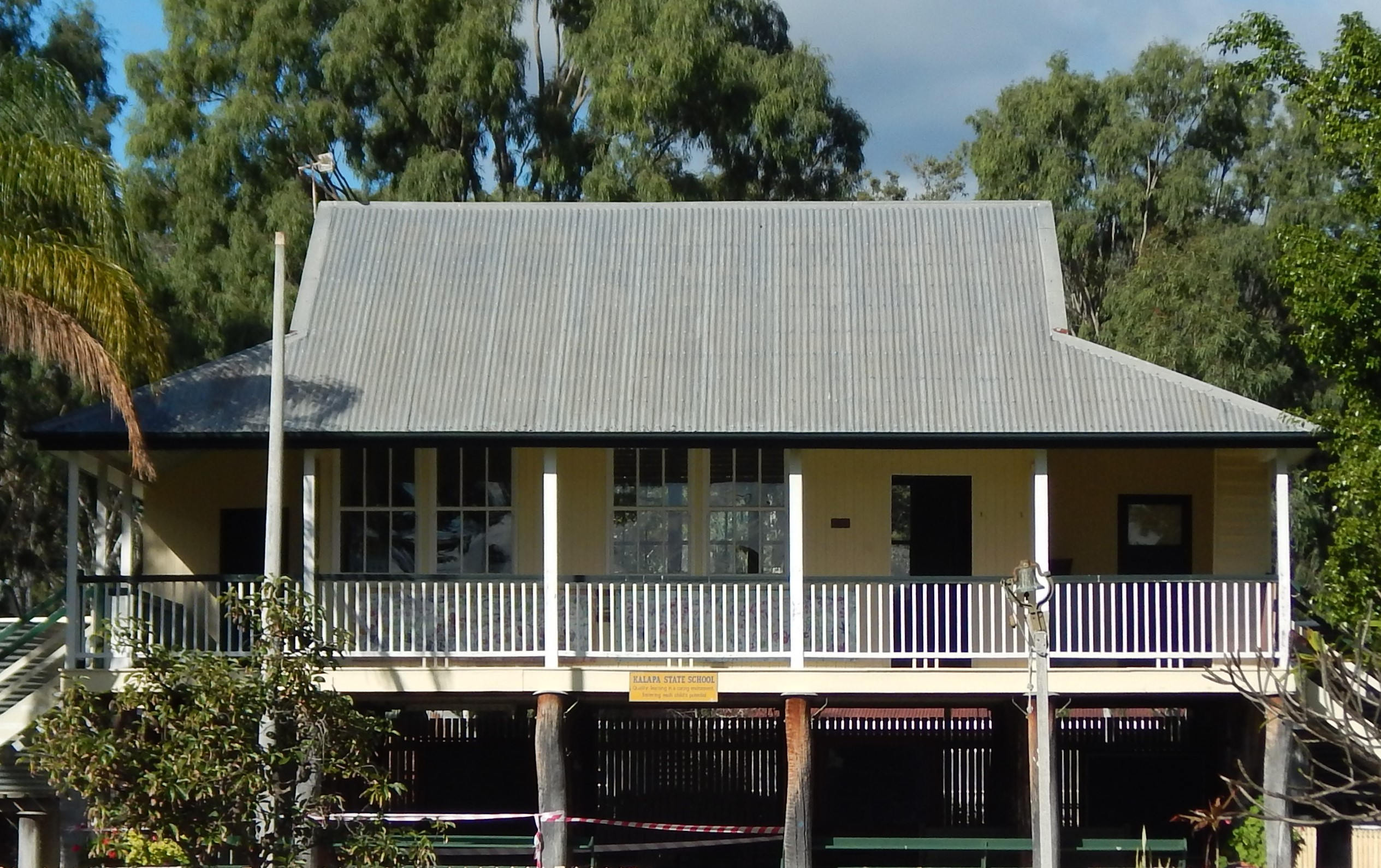
Kalapa State School on display at Rockhampton Heritage Village, 2021

Woodend State School opened on 8 June 1915 after local property owner Benjamin Dallow donated two acres of land to the education department to erect a new primary school. The opening was celebrated with a picnic on the banks of Neerkol Creek and an evening dance at the new school, where an official ceremony was also held, during which Dallow declared the school open. Some improvements were implemented following the initial opening, including raising the school onto stumps and boarding up unenclosed sides. The school was then officially opened by Herbert Hardacre in February 1917.

In 1934, Woodend State School was renamed Kalapa State School in line with the community's name change a decade earlier, and was situated at 22 Kalapa Black Mountain Road (23.5105°S 150.2682°E).

Kalapa State School closed on 13 December 1996. Following the school's closure, the building was donated and relocated to the Rockhampton Heritage Village township museum at Parkhurst where it has been preserved as a typical Australian country school of the 20th century. In 2015, the school's centenary was celebrated at Kalapa which included opening a time capsule which had been buried at the school's 75th anniversary in 1990.

In 2013, Australia's first farm-born, hand-cloned cow was born on a local Kalapa cattle property which attracted considerable interest from the scientific community and agricultural industry. The calf, named "Eve", was cloned from a prize Australian Brangus cow which had been purchased for $20,000. It was born on Oaklands Brangus Stud during the 2013 floods which were caused by ex-Cyclone Oswald. Australian reproductive specialists described the event as significant as it was believed to have been the first time a successful handmade cloning had been achieved using a somatic cell nuclear transfer outside a laboratory setting.

== Demographics ==
In the 2016 census, Kalapa had a population of 86 people.

In the 2021 census, Kalapa had a population of 97 people.

== Education ==
There are no schools in Kalapa. The nearest government primary schools are Stanwell State School in neighbouring Stanwell to the east and Westwood State School in Westwood to the south. The nearest government secondary school is Rockhampton State High School in Wandal, Rockhampton, to the east.

== Community groups ==
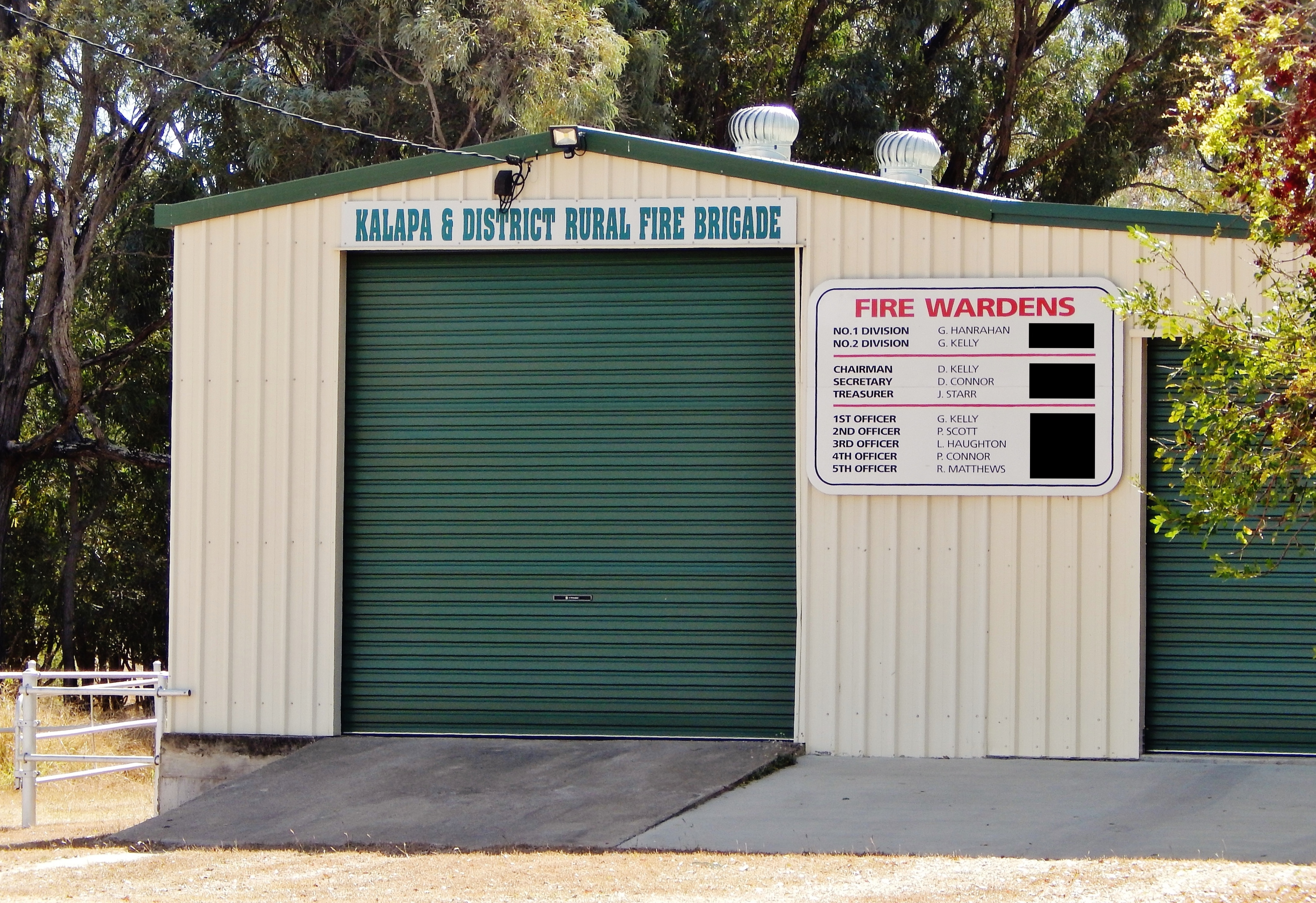
Kalapa & District Rural Fire Brigade, 2017

Kalapa is served by the Kalapa & District Fire Brigade. The brigade, made up of volunteer firefighters from the local community, was established in 1956. It celebrated its 60th anniversary in 2015 when it had 36 active members. In 2019, that number had grown to 55 active members, aged between 17 and 70.

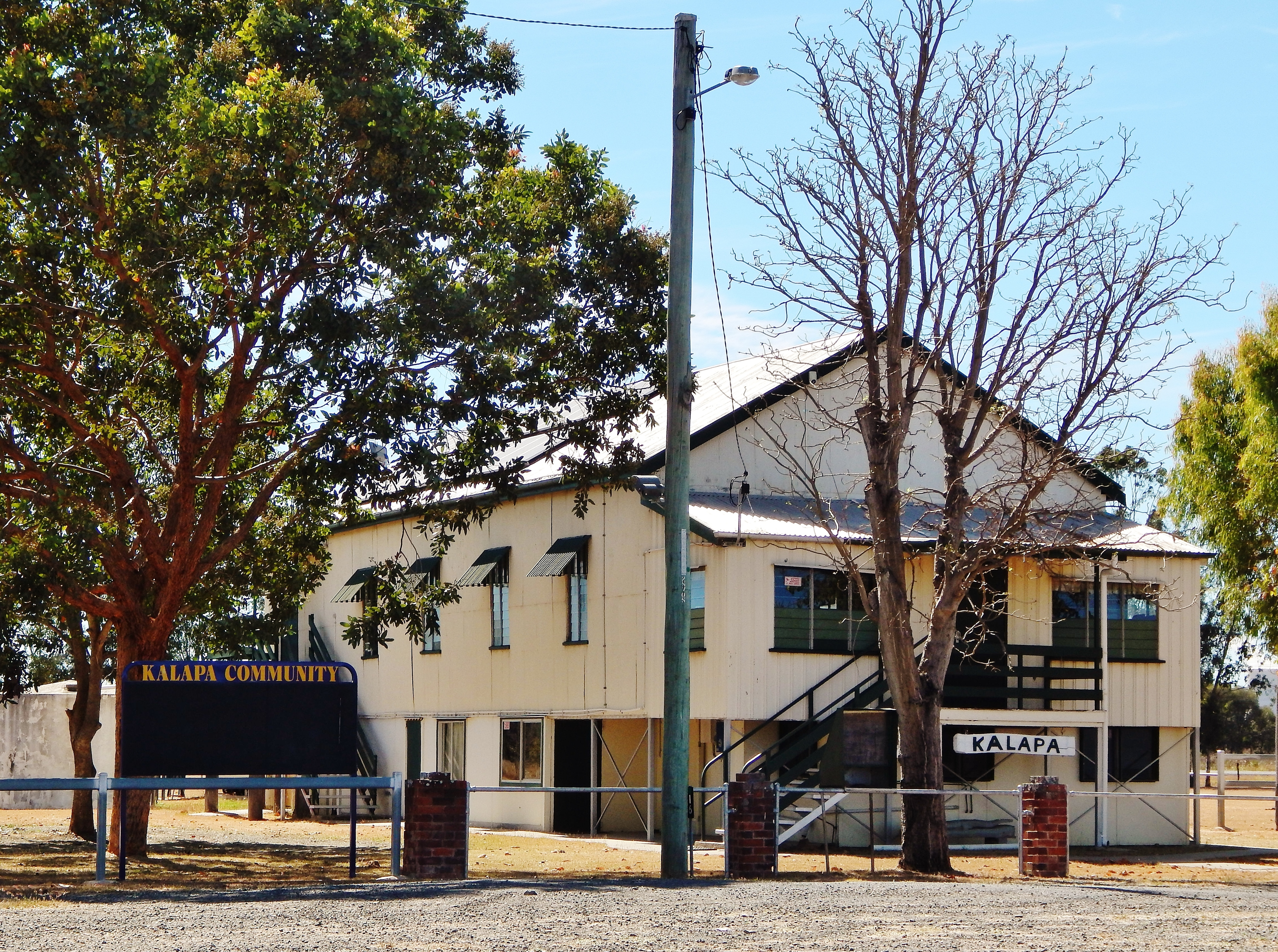
Kalapa Hall, 2017

The Kalapa Hall and Sports Committee manages the local community hall situated at 16 Kalapa-Black Mountain Road, where various local events, activities and functions are held including the annual Kalapa Horse Sports days. Repairs to the building and the surrounding grounds had to be undertaken following the major 2013 floods caused by ex-Cyclone Oswald which severely impacted the community of Kalapa. In 2019, a chair lift was installed to improve access to the hall for people with mobility issues. The Kalapa branch of the Queensland Country Women's Association regularly meets at the hall.
