= Morinish, Queensland =

Morinish
- Suburb
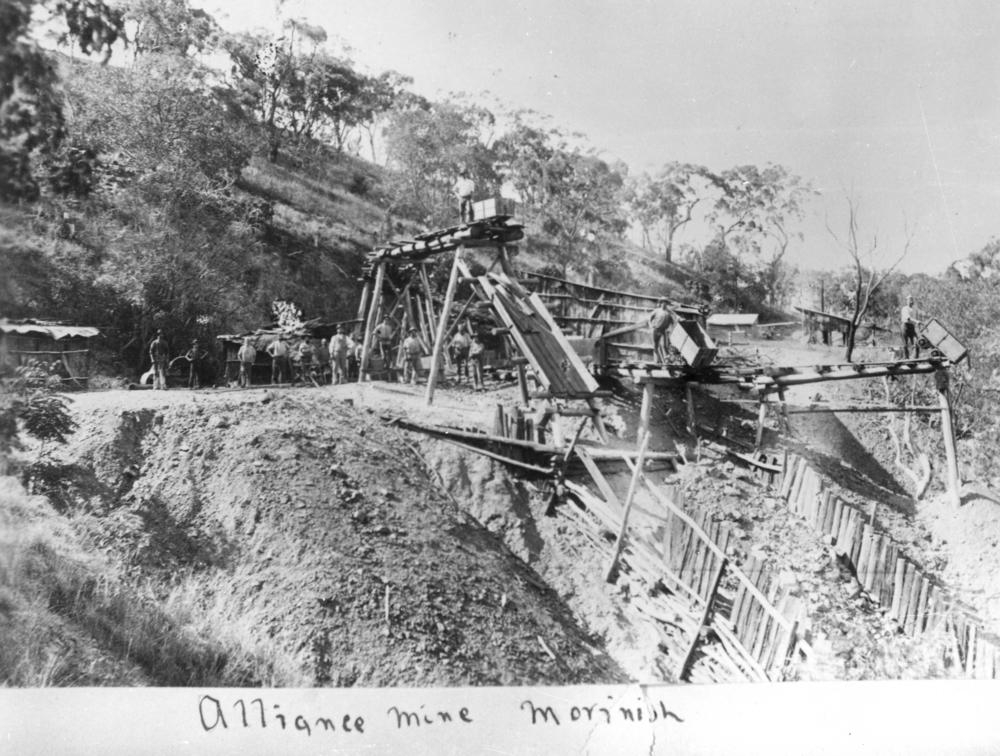
- Alliance Mine in operation at Morinish, circa 1890

- Interactive map of Morinish
- Coordinates: 23.205°S 150.0525°E
- Country: Australia
- State: Queensland
- LGA: Rockhampton Region
- Location: 36.5 km (22.7 mi) E of Ridgelands; 66.4 km (41.3 mi) NW of Rockhampton; 701 km (436 mi) NNW of Brisbane

Government
  - State electorate: Mirani
  - Federal division: Flynn

Area
  - Total: 756.3 km^{2} (292.0 sq mi)

Population
  - Total: 62 (2021 census)
  - Density: 0.0820/km^{2} (0.2123/sq mi)
- Time zone: UTC+10:00 (AEST)
- Postcode: 4702
Suburbs around Morinish
Glenroy	Canoona	Garnant
Glenroy	Morinish	Ridgelands
Glenroy	Morinish South	Dalma; Kalapa

Morinish is a rural locality in the Rockhampton Region, Queensland, Australia. In the 2021 census, Morinish had a population of 62 people.

== Geography ==
The locality is bounded by the Fitzroy River to the north and west.

Ten Mile Creek rises in the south-west of the locality (23.2864°S 150.0377°E) and flows northward through the locality where it becomes a tributary of the Fitzroy River (23.0861°S 150.0010°E).

The former town of Morinish is south of centre of the locality (approx 23.2524°S 150.1382°E).

== History ==
Gold was found at Morinish in 1866 with miners working in the area by December 1866, and a "new rush" being described in the newspapers in February 1867 with the population being estimated on the field as 600.

The Morinish Post Office opened on 1 July 1867 and closed on 4 November 1872.

There were at least three major mines in the period of 1880s to 1900s: Welcome Reef, Alliance Mine and Mount Morinish Mine.

Perhaps reflecting the changing fortunes on the goldfields, schooling in Morinish was available intermittently.

Morinish Provisional School opened circa 1882 and closed circa 1890. A second Morinish Provisional School opened circa 1894 and closed circa 1897, but it is not known if this was first school re-opening or a different school.

In 1902, two new provisional schools opened called Morinish No 1 Provisional School and Morinish No 2 Provisional School. They were half-time schools (meaning they shared a single teacher between them). In 1915, the No 2 school was closed and the No 1 school became the full-time Morinish State School. It closed in 1928 due to "insufficient pupils". In 1930, the school building was relocated to establish the State School at Garnant. Morinish State School was on Morinish Road (approx 23.2512°S 150.1566°E).

Ten Mile Creek Provisional School opened in 1916 but closed circa 1917.

Morinish was within the Shire of Fitzroy until 2008 when amalgamation of local government areas resulted in it becoming part of the newly created Rockhampton Region.

== Demographics ==
In the 2016 census, Morinish had a population of 89 people.

In the 2021 census, Morinish had a population of 62 people.

== Education ==
There are no school in Morinish. The nearest government primary school is Ridgelands State School in neighbouring Ridgelands to the west. The nearest government secondary school is Rockhampton State High School in Wandal, a suburb of Rockhampton; however, it is sufficiently distant that other options would be distance education and boarding school.

== Notable residents ==
- William Anderson Forbes (1839-1879), bush balladeer, worked on the goldfield in the 1860s.
- Fergus McMaster, one of the founders of the airline Qantas, was born in Morinish
