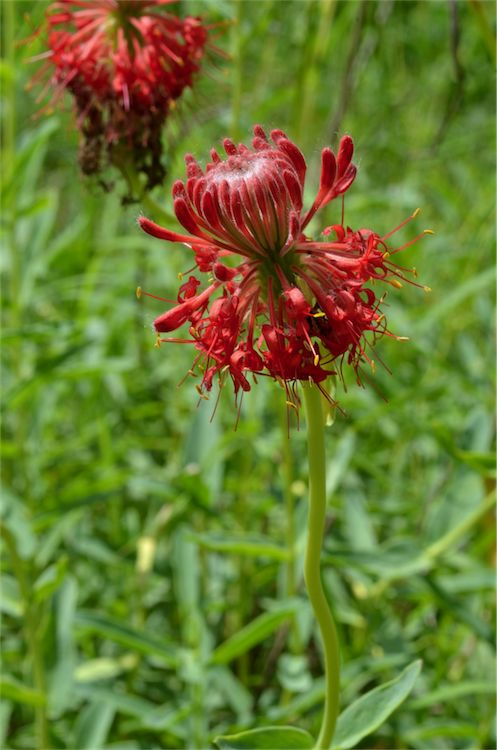
- Pimelea haematostachya near Wycarbah

Scientific classification
- Kingdom: Plantae
- Clade: Tracheophytes
- Clade: Angiosperms
- Clade: Eudicots
- Clade: Rosids
- Order: Malvales
- Family: Thymelaeaceae
- Genus: Pimelea
- Species: P. haematostachya

Binomial name
- Pimelea haematostachya F.Muell.

Synonyms
- Banksia haematostachya (F.Muell.) Kuntze

= Pimelea haematostachya =

Pimelea poppy

Species of shrub

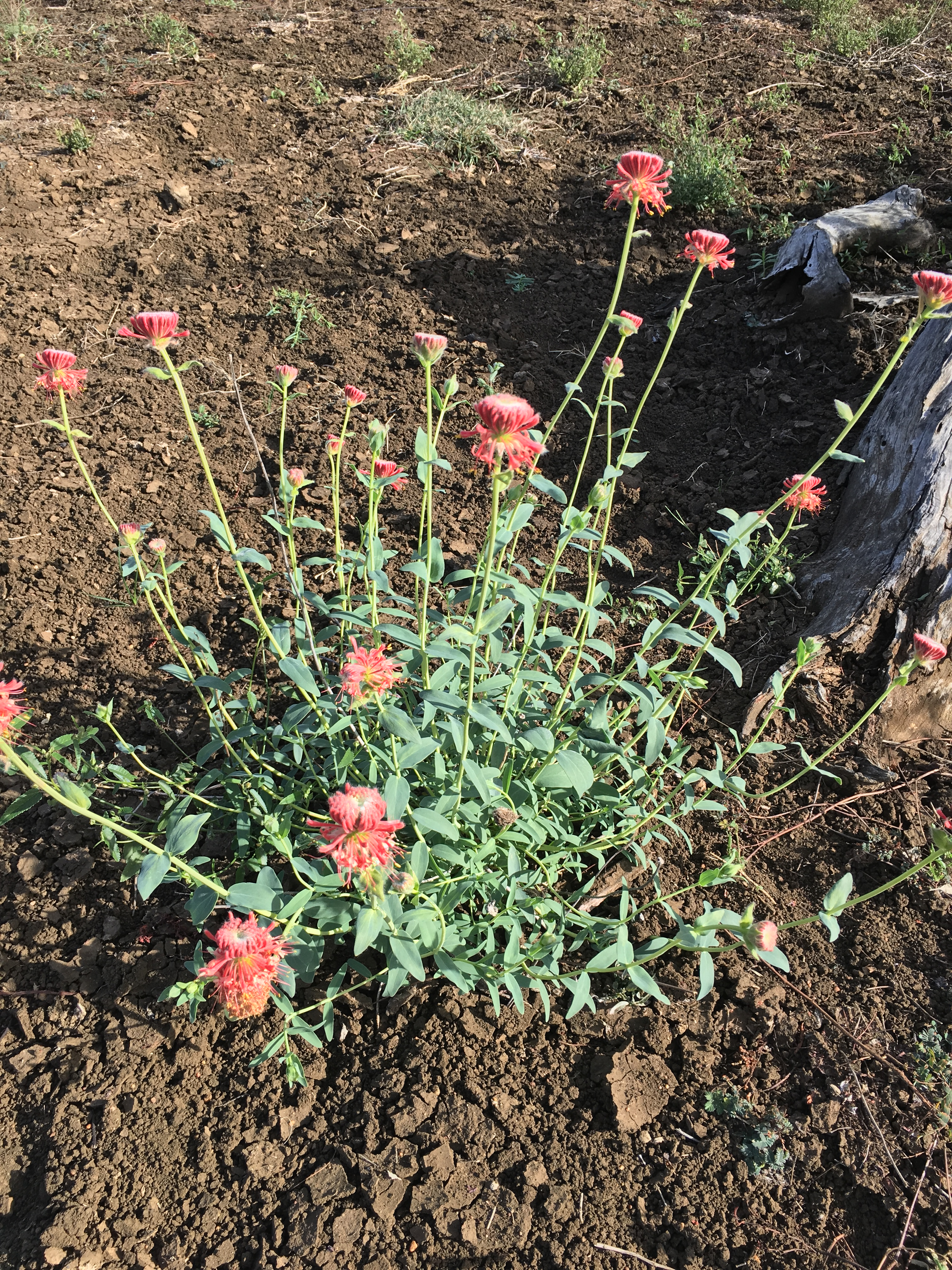
Habit near Charters Towers

Pimelea haematostachya, commonly known as pimelea poppy, is a species of flowering plant in the family Thymelaeaceae and is endemic to Queensland. It is a perennial herb with narrowly egg-shaped or narrowly elliptic leaves and heads of red flowers.

== Description ==
Pimelea haematostachya is a perennial herb that usually grows to a height of 0.2–1 m (7.9 in – 3 ft 3.4 in) but has a woody base. The leaves are narrowly egg-shaped to narrowly elliptic, usually 18–85 mm (0.71–3.35 in) long, 1.5–20 mm (0.059–0.787 in) wide and sometimes glaucous. The flowers are arranged in heads on a rachis 40–130 mm (1.6–5.1 in) long, surrounded by narrowly egg-shaped, hairy involucral bracts 10–13.5 mm (0.39–0.53 in) long and 1.5–4 mm (0.059–0.157 in) wide, but that fall off as the flowers open. The flowers are red with a yellow base, the floral tube 10.5–13 mm (0.41–0.51 in) long and later shed above the ovary. The sepals are 4–5 mm (0.16–0.20 in) long, the stamens much longer than the sepals. Flowering mainly occurs from June to February.

== Taxonomy ==
Pimelea haematostachya was first formally described in 1859 by Ferdinand von Mueller in Fragmenta Phytographiae Australiae from specimens collected near the Burnett River.

== Distribution and habitat ==
This pimelea grows in grassland from near the Gilbert River to near the Burnett River in north Queensland.

== Conservation status ==
Pimelea haematostachya is listed as "least concern" under the Queensland Government Nature Conservation Act 1992.
