= Bushley, Queensland =

Bushley
- Suburb
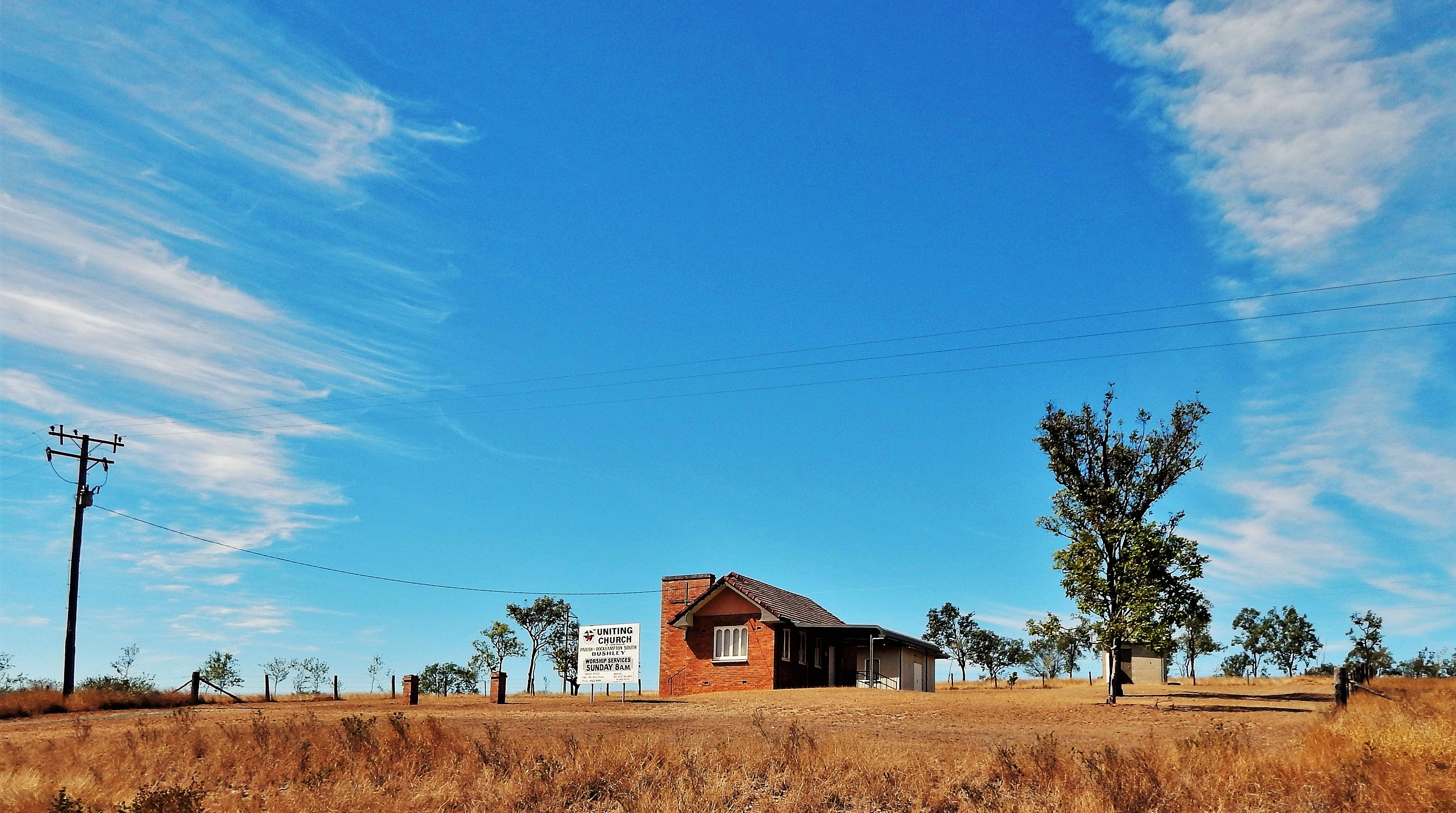
- Bushley, 2017

- Interactive map of Bushley
- Coordinates: 23.5922°S 150.2688°E
- Country: Australia
- State: Queensland
- LGA: Rockhampton Region
- Location: 34.9 km (21.7 mi) SW of Gracemere; 45.0 km (28.0 mi) SW of Rockhampton CBD; 55.7 km (34.6 mi) NW of Mount Morgan; 666 km (414 mi) NNW of Brisbane

Government
  - State electorate: Mirani
  - Federal division: Flynn

Area
  - Total: 137.7 km^{2} (53.2 sq mi)

Population
  - Total: 36 (2021 census)
  - Density: 0.261/km^{2} (0.677/sq mi)
- Time zone: UTC+10:00 (AEST)
- Postcode: 4702
Suburbs around Bushley
Wycarbah	Kalapa	Stanwell
Westwood	Bushley	Stanwell
Westwood	Westwood	Boulder Creek

Bushley is a rural locality in the Rockhampton Region, Queensland, Australia. In the 2021 census, Bushley had a population of 36 people.

== Geography ==
The Central Western railway line forms the northern boundary of the locality, with the now-abandoned Bushley railway station (23.5284°S 150.2510°E) serving the locality.

Bushley has the following mountains (from north to south):

- Mount Hay (23.5671°S 150.2141°E) 360 metres (1,180 ft)
- Mount Gordon (23.5677°S 150.2776°E) 175 metres (574 ft)
- Mount Coombs (23.5716°S 150.2795°E) 200 metres (660 ft)
- Browns Lookout (23.5729°S 150.2997°E) 200 metres (660 ft)

The land use is predominantly grazing on native vegetation.

== History ==
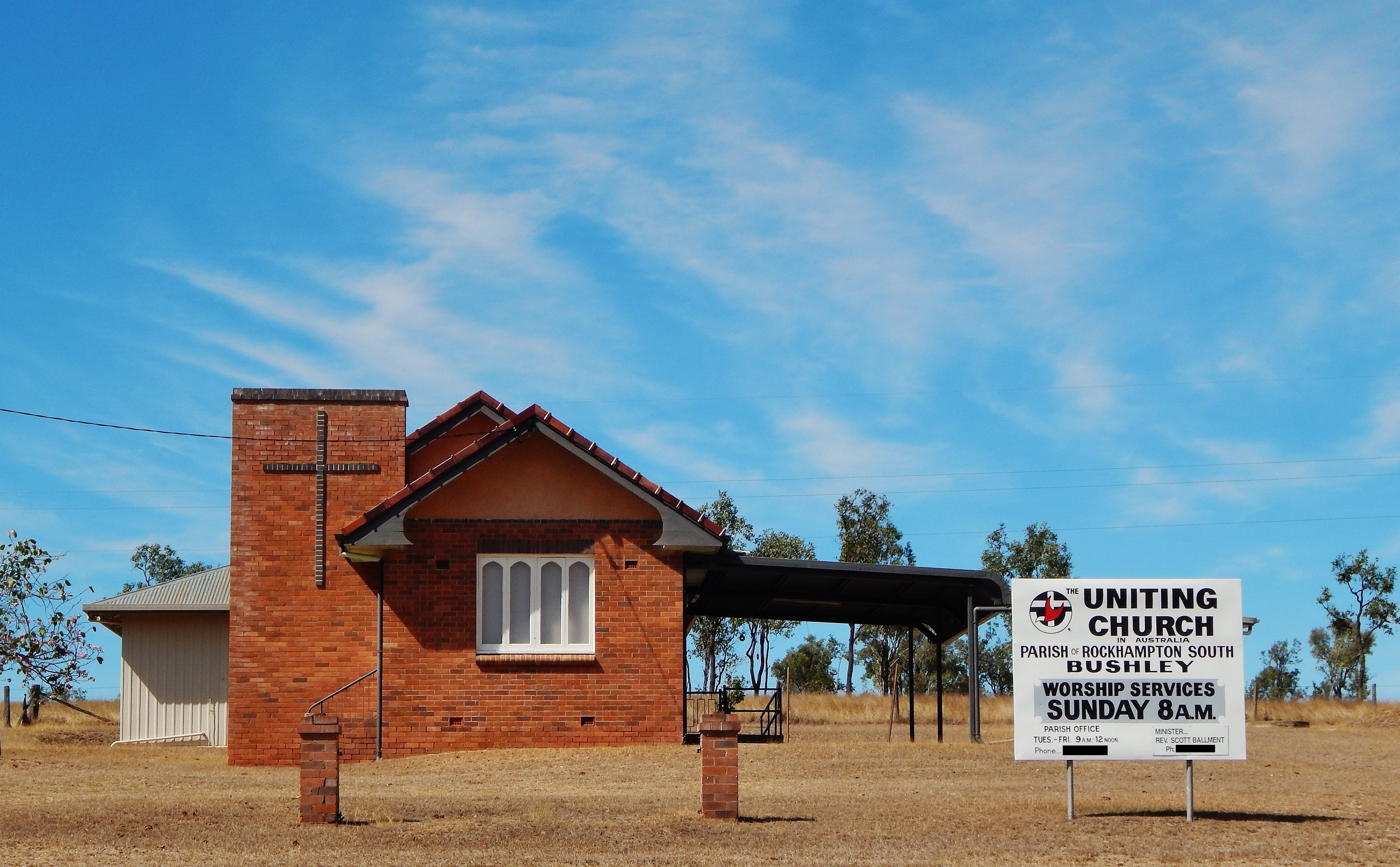
Bushley Uniting Church, 2017

Methodist church services at Bushley date back to 1875 when Reverend Robert Hartley commenced worship services at the home of Mr and Mrs Isaac Coombs family. The Coombs family later donated their land for the construction of a community hall where church services were held until the opening of the existing brick church building in 1959 in front of the hall. The Bushley Methodist Church was officially opened on 13 December 1959. It became the Bushley Uniting Church following the amalgamation of the Methodist Church into the Uniting Church in Australia in 1977. The final service was held at the church on 5 December 2021, just shy of its 62nd anniversary, which was attended by about 75 people including Uniting Church moderator Rev Andrew Gunton. The church was closed due to dwindling attendance numbers. Bushley Uniting Church was at 525 Brickworks Road (access from Bushley Road off the Capricorn Highway, 23.5288°S 150.2528°E). It was part of the Parish of Rockhampton South Uniting Church.

Playfair State School opened on 10 July 1917. It closed in 1928. It presumably takes its name from the parish. The school was located at approximately 213 Sandy Creek Road (23.5364°S 150.2661°E).

In 2019, Bushley was selected as the site of a new waste transfer station which aimed to serve the needs of residents of Rockhampton Regional Council's western districts from Gogango to Stanwell following the closure of roadside bin stations. The council's decision to close the local roadside bin stations had previously been criticised by residents and led to a heated community meeting at nearby Wycarbah in 2018.

== Demographics ==
In the 2016 census, Bushley had a population of 30 people.

In the 2021 census, Bushley had a population of 36 people.

== Education ==
There are no schools in Bushley. The nearest government primary schools are Stanwell State School in neighbouring Stanwell to the north-east, Mount Morgan Central State School in Mount Morgan to the south-east, and Westwood State School in neighbouring Westwood to the west.

The nearest government secondary schools are Mount Morgan State High School in Mount Morgan to the south-east and Rockhampton State High School in Wandal, Rockhampton, to the north-east. However, students living in the south-west of the locality might be too distant from these secondary schools for a daily commute; the alternatives are distance education and boarding school.

There are also a number of non-government schools in Rockhampton.

== Attractions ==
Browns Lookout is a tourist attraction (23.5731°S 150.2998°E).
