= Balcomba, Queensland =

Balcomba
- Suburb
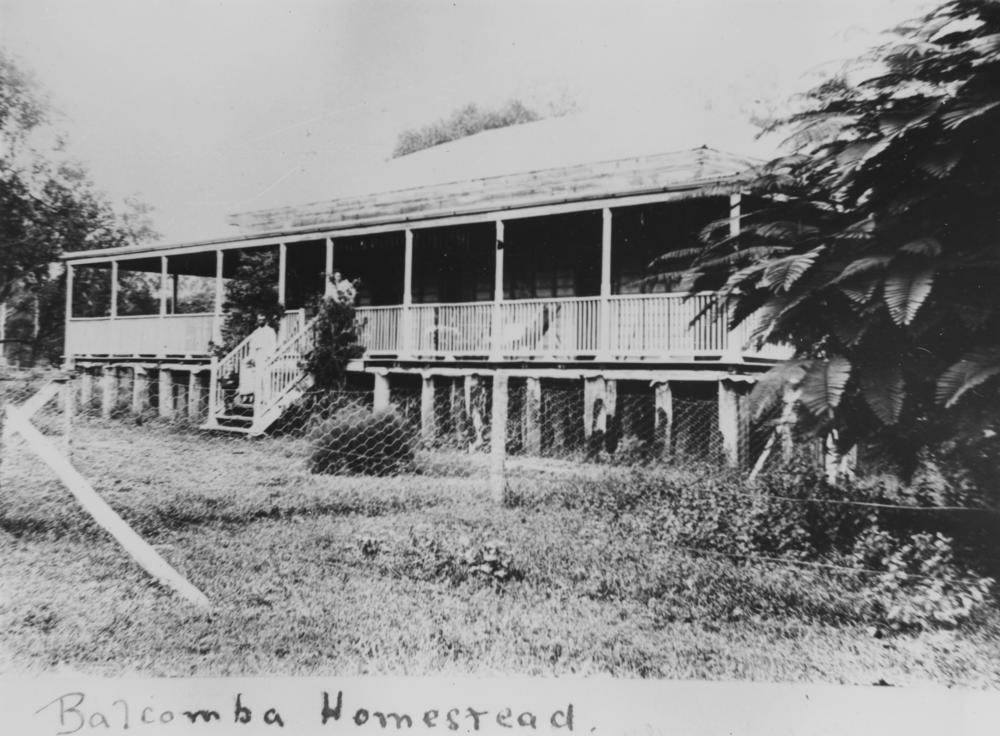
- Balcomba Homestead, circa 1900

- Interactive map of Balcomba
- Coordinates: 23.3236°S 149.6433°E
- Country: Australia
- State: Queensland
- LGAs: Central Highlands Region; Aboriginal Shire of Woorabinda
- Location: 26.2 km (16.3 mi) N of Duaringa; 85.4 km (53.1 mi) NNE of Woorabinda; 138 km (86 mi) WSW of Rockhampton; 186 km (116 mi) E of Emerald; 758 km (471 mi) NNW of Brisbane

Government
  - State electorate: Gregory
  - Federal division: Flynn

Area
  - Total: 924.6 km^{2} (357.0 sq mi)

Population
  - Total: 29 (2021 census)
  - Density: 0.0314/km^{2} (0.0812/sq mi)
- Time zone: UTC+10:00 (AEST)
- Postcode: 4702
Suburbs around Balcomba
Mackenzie	Mount Gardiner	Marlborough
Goowarra	Balcomba	Glenroy
Duaringa	Gogango	Gogango

Balcomba is a rural locality split between the Central Highlands Region and the Aboriginal Shire of Woorabinda, Queensland, Australia. In the 2021 census, Balcomba had a population of 29 people.

== Geography ==
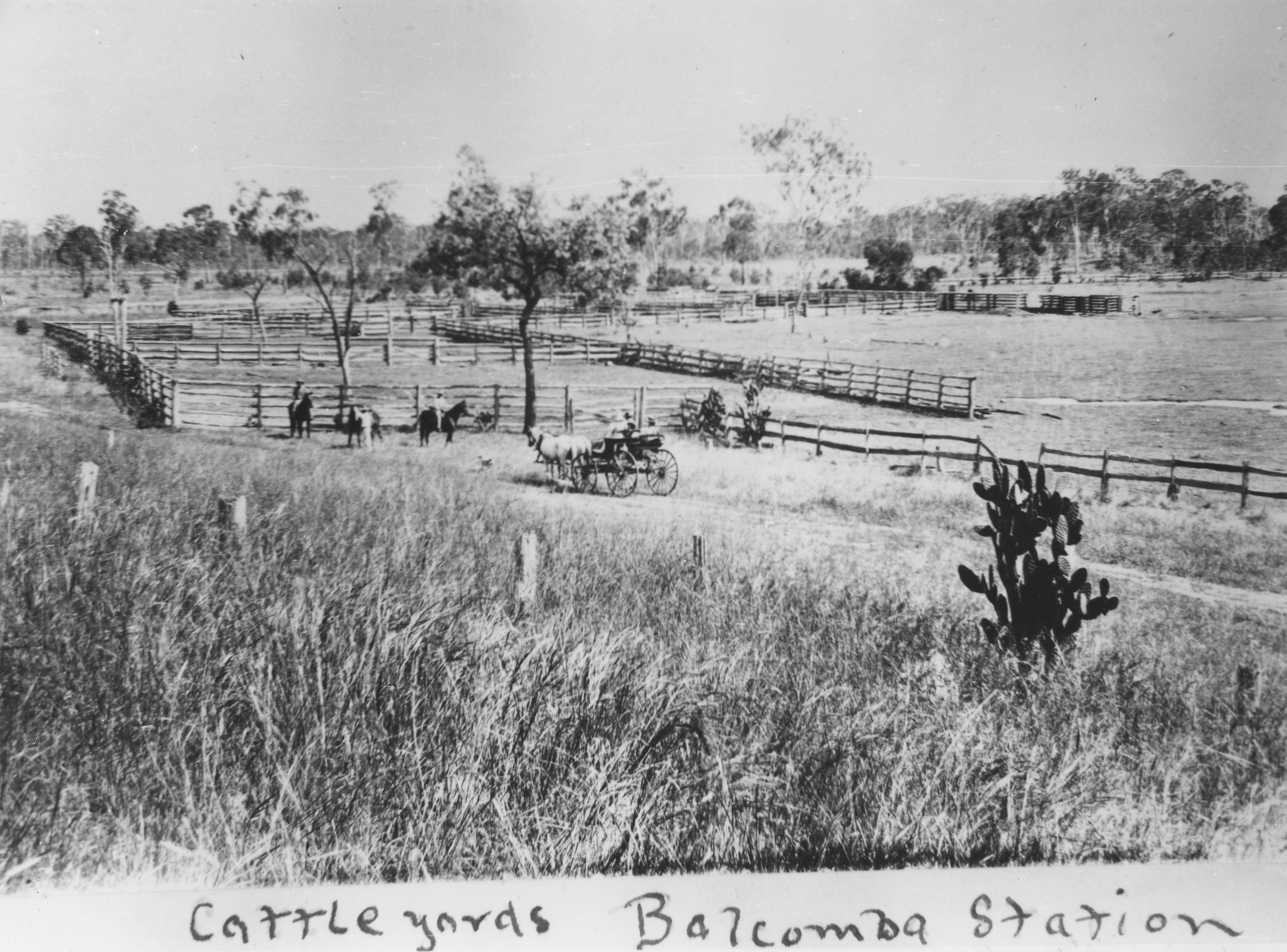
Cattleyards on the Balcomba Station, circa 1900

The Mackenzie River forms the western boundary of the locality, entering from the north-west (Mackenzie / Mount Gardiner) and exiting to the south-west (Duaringa / Gogango).

Local government boundaries split Balcomba into three parts:

- the larger northern part in Central Highlands Region (23.27337°S 149.62852°E)
- the smaller middle part in the Aboriginal Shire of Woorabinda (23.47909°S 149.69051°E)
- smaller southern part in Central Highlands Region (23.52391°S 149.75727°E)

The land use is predominantly grazing on native vegetation with some crop growing in the south of the locality.

== History ==
In 1863, Balcomba pastoral Station was owned by A. Thompson and Turner. In 1905, it was sold with 2300 cattle and 60-80 horses to Mr M. M. McKellar. After World War I, James Lockie Wilson and P. J. C. McDouall bought Calliungal, Rannes and Balcomba pastoral stations. Balcomba station was on the Mackenzie River and was 209 square miles (540 km^{2}).

== Demographics ==
In the 2016 census, Balcomba had a population of 16 people.

In the 2021 census, Balcomba had a population of 29 people.

== Economy ==
There are a number of homesteads in the locality:

- Santa Fe (23.1236°S 149.5491°E)
- Leura (23.1729°S 149.5756°E)
- Balcomba (23.4079°S 149.6303°E)

== Education ==
There are no schools in Balcomba. The nearest government primary school is Duaringa State School in neighbouring Duaringa to the south; however, it would be too distant for students in the north of Balcomba. There are no nearby secondary schools. The alternatives are distance education and boarding school.
