= Dalma, Queensland =

Dalma
- Suburb
- Interactive map of Dalma
- Coordinates: 23.3580°S 150.2266°E
- Country: Australia
- State: Queensland
- LGA: Rockhampton Region
- Location: 38.4 km (23.9 mi) W of Rockhampton CBD; 640 km (400 mi) NNW of Brisbane

Government
  - State electorate: Mirani
  - Federal division: Flynn

Area
  - Total: 92.8 km^{2} (35.8 sq mi)

Population
  - Total: 95 (2021 census)
  - Density: 1.024/km^{2} (2.651/sq mi)
- Time zone: UTC+10:00 (AEST)
- Postcode: 4702
Suburbs around Dalma
Morinish	Ridgelands	Ridgelands
Morinish	Dalma	Alton Downs
Kalapa	Stanwell	Nine Mile

Dalma is a rural locality in the Rockhampton Region, Queensland, Australia. In the 2021 census, Dalma had a population of 95 people.

== History ==
Dalma Provisional School opened on 5 March 1889 and closed in 1893.

Dalma Road Provisional School opened on 25 February 1901. On 1 January 1909, it became Dalma Road State School. It closed in 1934. It was at 32 Harding Road in the present-day locality of Alton Downs (north-west corner of Nicholson Road, 23.3454°S 150.3478°E).

Dalma Scrub Provisional School opened in May 1920. In 1926 it became Dalma Scrub State School. In 1947, it was renamed Dalma State School. It was "mothballed" on 30 January 2006 and closed on 31 December 2006. It was at 5 Shannen Road (23.3537°S 150.2432°E).

== Demographics ==
In the 2016 census, Dalma had a population of 78 people.

In the 2021 census, Dalma had a population of 95 people.

== Education ==
There are no schools in Dalma. The nearest government primary schools are Ridgelands State School in neighbouring Ridgelands to the north and Stanwell State School in neighbouring Stanwell to the south. The nearest government secondary school is Rockhampton State High School in Wandal, Rockhampton.
