= Fergus McMaster =

Australian businessman and aviator (1879–1950)

Sir Fergus McMaster
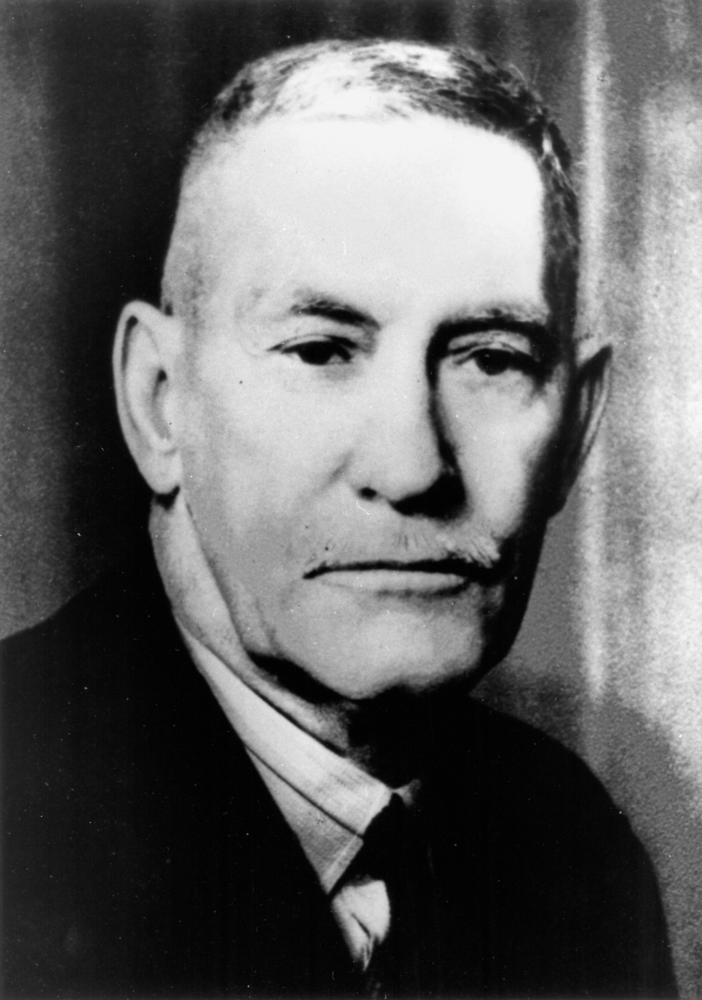
- Born: 3 May 1879; Morinish, Queensland, Australia
- Died: 8 August 1950 (aged 71); Brisbane, Queensland, Australia
- Occupation(s): Businessman, soldier
- Employer: Self employed: McMaster Brothers Pty. Ltd.
- Known for: Founding of QANTAS
- Spouse: Edith Scougall 1889-1913 (died 1913) + Edna Faulkner 1894 - 1960 (died 1960)
- Children: 4 (Jean [Edith] + Ken, Ross, Duncan [Edna])

- Allegiance: Australia
- Branch: Australian Imperial Force
- Rank: Gunner

Sir Fergus McMaster (3 May 1879 – 8 August 1950) was an Australian businessman and aviation pioneer. He was one of the three founders of the Queensland and Northern Territory Aerial Services Limited, the airline company that became commonly known by its acronym, Qantas.

== Early life ==
McMaster was born in Morinish, a town near the city of Rockhampton, Queensland. As a young man, he assisted his brothers as a sheep grazier. He married Edith Scougall in 1911; she died in 1913. In January 1917 he enlisted in the First Australian Imperial Force and served as a gunner and dispatch rider in France during World War I.

== Business ==
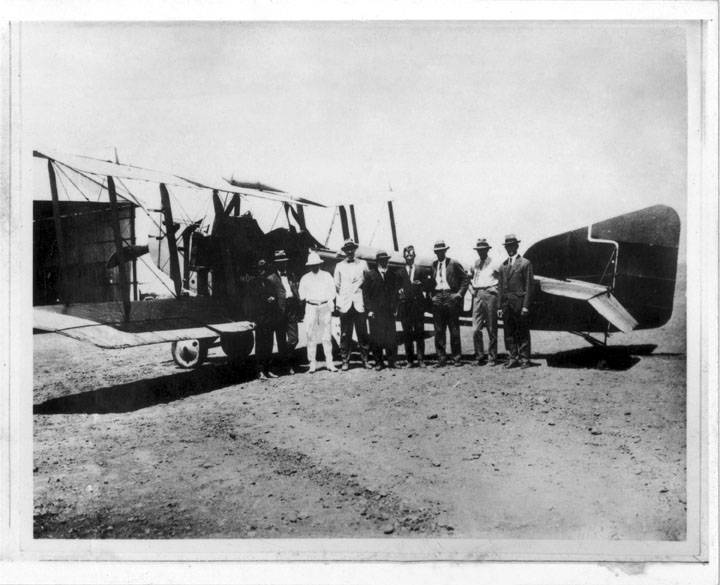
Arrival at Longreach of the Armstrong Whitworth FK8 with the first bag of air mail on the inaugural flight of the first Qantas air service from Charleville to Cloncurry, 22 November 1922 (McMaster is third from right)

McMaster was named as chairman of Qantas at the company's establishment in 1920 and served in that capacity for all but three of the next 27 years until 1947, when Qantas was taken over by the Australian government. He was knighted in 1941 for his services towards the development and survival of Qantas, and the development of other companies, such as North Australian Worsted & Woollen Mills Ltd and Electric Supply Co., Charters Towers, was treasurer of Queensland Country Party and a member of the Executive Council of the Queensland Graziers Association.

== Later life ==
McMaster died in Brisbane on 8 August 1950. His funeral was held on 10 August 1950 at St Andrew's Presbyterian Church, after which he was cremated at Mount Thompson crematorium.

In 2008, Qantas named one its fleet of twelve Airbus A380s (registration VH-OQD) "Fergus McMaster" in recognition of its first chairman's contribution to the aviation industry and particularly to Qantas.
