= Garnant, Queensland =

Garnant
- Suburb
- Interactive map of Garnant
- Coordinates: 23.1713°S 150.2613°E
- Country: Australia
- State: Queensland
- LGA: Rockhampton Region
- Location: 10.9 km (6.8 mi) N of Ridgelands; 40.9 km (25.4 mi) NW of Rockhampton CBD; 672 km (418 mi) NNW of Brisbane

Government
  - State electorate: Mirani
  - Federal division: Flynn

Area
  - Total: 96.8 km^{2} (37.4 sq mi)

Population
  - Total: 90 (2021 census)
  - Density: 0.93/km^{2} (2.41/sq mi)
- Time zone: UTC+10:00 (AEST)
- Postcode: 4702
Suburbs around Garnant
Morinish	Canoona	Yaamba
Morinish	Garnant	South Yaamba
Morinish	Ridgelands	South Yaamba

Garnant is a rural locality in the Rockhampton Region, Queensland, Australia. In the 2021 census, Garnant had a population of 90 people.

== History ==
Garnant State School opened on 11 September 1930. The school was called Garnant after the town Garnant in Glamorganishire, Wales, which was the home town of local resident Abraham Jones who took a leading role in establishing the school. Presumably the locality took its name from the school. The school building was relocated from neighbouring Morinish (as the Morinish State School had closed in 1928). Garnant State School closed in 1969. It was on Evans Road (23.1902°S 150.2595°E).

== Demographics ==
In the 2016 census, Garnant had a population of 99 people.

In the 2021 census, Garnant had a population of 90 people.

== Education ==
There are no schools in Garnant. The nearest government primary school is Ridgelands State School in neighbouring Ridgelands to the south. The nearest government secondary school is Rockhampton State High School in Wandal, Rockhampton, to the south-east. There are also non-governments schools in Rockhampton and its suburbs.
