= Pink Lily =

- Suburb
- Interactive map of Pink Lily
- Coordinates: 23.3519°S 150.4594°E
- Country: Australia
- State: Queensland
- LGA: Rockhampton Region
- Location: 5.4 km (3.4 mi) NW of Rockhampton CBD; 640 km (400 mi) NNW of Brisbane

Government
  - State electorate: Mirani
  - Federal division: Capricornia

Area
  - Total: 31.7 km^{2} (12.2 sq mi)

Population
  - Total: 193 (2021 census)
  - Density: 6.088/km^{2} (15.77/sq mi)
- Time zone: UTC+10:00 (AEST)
- Postcode: 4702
Suburbs around Pink Lily
Alton Downs	Glenlee	Parkhurst
Alton Downs	Pink Lily	Kawana
Nine Mile	Fairy Bower	Wandal; West Rockhampton

Pink Lily is a rural locality in the Rockhampton Region, Queensland, Australia. The proposed Rockhampton Ring Road will pass through Pink Lily. In the 2021 census, Pink Lily had a population of 193 people.

== History ==
The locality takes its name from the Pink Lily railway station, named by the Queensland Railways Department on 22 August 1916, taking the name from the Pink Lily Lagoon (23.3411°S 150.4770°E).

Pink Lily Lagoon State School opened on 9 September 1872. It closed on 30 April 1971. It was at 17 Six Mile Road (23.3576°S 150.4704°E).

Pink Lily Primitive Methodist Church opened on Friday 10 December 1886.

== Demographics ==
In the 2016 census, Pink Lily had a population of 231 people.

In the 2021 census, Pink Lily had a population of 193 people.

== Education ==
There are no schools in Pink Lily. The nearest government primary schools are The Hall State School in neighbouring Wandal to the south-east and Gracemere State School in Gracemere to the south. The nearest government secondary school is Rockhampton State High School, also in Wandal.
