= Morinish South, Queensland =

Morinish South
- Suburb
- Interactive map of Morinish South
- Coordinates: 23.3647°S 150.0211°E
- Country: Australia
- State: Queensland
- LGA: Rockhampton Region
- Location: 36.4 km (22.6 mi) N of Westwood; 63.4 km (39.4 mi) W of Rockhampton CBD; 693 km (431 mi) NNW of Brisbane

Government
  - State electorate: Mirani
  - Federal division: Flynn

Area
  - Total: 367.8 km^{2} (142.0 sq mi)

Population
  - Total: 13 (2021 census)
  - Density: 0.0353/km^{2} (0.092/sq mi)
- Time zone: UTC+10:00 (AEST)
- Postcode: 4702
Suburbs around Morinish South
Glenroy	Morinish	Morinish
Gogango	Morinish South	Kalapa
Wycarbah	Wycarbah	Kalapa

Morinish South is a rural locality in the Rockhampton Region, Queensland, Australia. In the 2021 census, Morinish South had a population of 13 people.

== Geography ==
The Fitzroy River enters the locality from the south (Wycarbah) and forms the south-western and western boundaries of the locality before exiting the locality to the north (Glenroy / Morinish).

Morinish South has the following mountains (from north to south):

- Round Mountain in the north-west of the locality (23.3135°S 149.9547°E) 148 metres (486 ft)
- Mount Wallace in the north-west of the locality (23.3172°S 149.9785°E) 130 metres (430 ft)
- Figtree Mountain in the south-east of the locality (23.4338°S 150.1402°E) 393 metres (1,289 ft)

The land use is predominantly grazing on native vegetation.

== Demographics ==
In the 2016 census, Morinish South had "no people or a very low population".

In the 2021 census, Morinish South had a population of 13 people.

== Education ==
There are no schools in Morinish South. The nearest government primary schools are Westwood State School in Westwood to the south-east and Ridgelands State School in Ridgelands to the north-east; however, some students in the locality may be too distant to attend either school. Also, there are no nearby secondary schools. The alternatives are distance education and boarding school.
