= Rockhampton Region =

Coordinates: 23°22′29.97″S 150°30′42.02″E

- Local government area
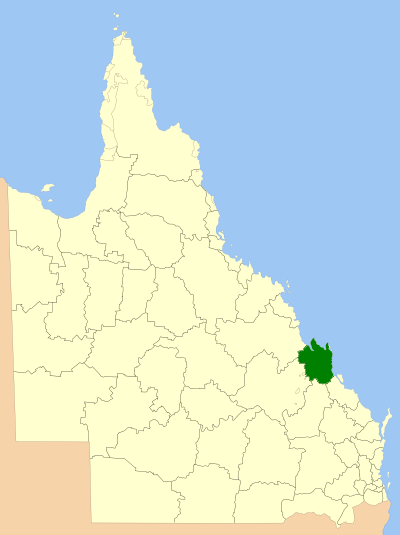
- Location in Queensland, 2013, prior to de-amalgamation of Shire of Livingstone

- Interactive map of Rockhampton Region
- Country: Australia
- State: Queensland
- Region: Central Queensland
- Established: 2008
- Council seat: Rockhampton

Government
  - Mayor: Tony Williams (Labor)
  - State electorates: Rockhampton; Keppel; Mirani
  - Federal divisions: Capricornia; Flynn

Area
  - Total: 6,570 km^{2} (2,540 sq mi)

Population
  - Total: 81,968 (2021 census)
  - Density: 12.476/km^{2} (32.313/sq mi)
- Postcode: 4700, 4701, 4702, 4703, 4704, 4705, 4706, 4707
- Website: Rockhampton Region
LGAs around Rockhampton Region
Isaac	Livingstone	Coral Sea
Central Highlands	Rockhampton Region	Coral Sea
Woorabinda	Banana	Gladstone

The Rockhampton Region is a local government area (LGA) in Central Queensland, Australia, located on the Tropic of Capricorn about 600 kilometres (370 mi) north of Brisbane. Rockhampton is the region's major city; the region also includes the Fitzroy River, Mount Archer National Park and Berserker Range.

In the 2021 census, the Rockhampton Region had a population of 81,968 people.

== History ==
Established in 2008, it was preceded by four previous local government areas extending to almost the beginning of local government in Queensland. On 1 January 2014, one of those local government areas, the Shire of Livingstone was restored as an independent council.

Prior to the 2008 amalgamation, the Rockhampton Region existed as four distinct local government areas:

- the City of Rockhampton;
- the Shire of Fitzroy;
- the Shire of Livingstone (now de-amalgamated);
- and the Shire of Mount Morgan.

Rockhampton was proclaimed as Queensland's fourth municipality (after Brisbane, Ipswich and Toowoomba) on 13 December 1860 under the Municipalities Act 1858, a piece of New South Wales legislation inherited by Queensland when it became a separate colony in 1859. It held its first election on 26 February 1861 and its inaugural meeting on 1 March 1861. The municipality had an area of 13 km^{2} (5.0 sq mi) located on the south bank of the Fitzroy River and had a population of about 600. In 1864, the council was divided into three wards—Fitzroy, Archer and Leichhardt. A proposal to greatly expand its area southwards to include Gracemere and Bouldercombe was rejected in part due to opposition from influential squatters in the area. It achieved a measure of autonomy in 1878 with the enactment of the Local Government Act.

On 11 November 1879, the Gogango Divisional Board was established as one of 74 divisions around Queensland under the Divisional Boards Act 1879. It covered an area of 16,239 km^{2} (6,270 sq mi) surrounding the municipality—an area significantly greater than the modern Rockhampton Region covers. Capital and people came to the area in greater numbers after the discovery of gold in 1882 at Mount Morgan, about 20 kilometres (12 mi) south of Rockhampton. A Municipal Borough was proclaimed there on 22 May 1890.

A bridge was built spanning the Fitzroy River in 1882, and a year later in September 1883, the North Rockhampton Borough was proclaimed. North Rockhampton had a somewhat unhappy 36-year existence—its small population and location opposite the stronger and wealthier Rockhampton borough made comparisons inevitable and development of its own identity almost impossible. In 1919, it was described as a "small and straggling hamlet". Nevertheless, it was able to get a loan to construct a Municipal Chambers in 1885, which was completed in December of that year. The town clerk's arrest for embezzlement in 1890 marked the beginning of a period of difficulties characterised by disputes with the surrounding Gogango Divisional Board over road construction, and internal conflict between members of council, in which the Queensland Government was often requested to intervene. It did not have a reliable water supply and at the time of its amalgamation was still trying to raise funds for a dam.

The Fitzroy Division was proclaimed on 6 April 1899 out of the southern part of Gogango. With the passage of the Local Authorities Act 1902, Rockhampton became one of three former municipalities, alongside Brisbane and Townsville, to become a City on 31 March 1903, while North Rockhampton and Mount Morgan became Towns and the divisions of Gogango and Fitzroy became Shires. Gogango was renamed Livingstone on 8 August 1903.

The State Government became concerned in 1918 after both the City of Rockhampton and Town of North Rockhampton councils proposed separate water infrastructure projects. On Saturday 25 January 1919, an amalgamation referendum held in North Rockhampton passed with 884 of the 1,029 votes cast in favour. On 15 March 1919, elections for the new four-ward council with 11 councillors took place, with their first meeting being held five days later. North Rockhampton's chambers, located in Stapleton Park, North Rockhampton, became a Main Roads office for about four decades, and eventually was restored and, since 1985, has been the home of Rockhampton and District Historical Society.

Wards were abolished at some point and were not reintroduced until 1982, when the council was restructured with 10 divisions each electing one councillor, plus a mayor elected by the entire City. On 1 July 1984, the City grew northwards by annexing Parkhurst, where its water treatment facility was being constructed, from the Shire of Livingstone. The council tried on several occasions to expand further into the Livingstone and Fitzroy areas, but a referendum in Fitzroy on 9 February 1991 was opposed by 83% of valid votes cast.

In July 2007, the Local Government Reform Commission released a report making recommendations for statewide reform of local government boundaries, and recommended that the four areas of Rockhampton, Fitzroy, Livingstone and Mount Morgan amalgamate, due to a community of interest centred upon Rockhampton. The very weak sustainability rating given to the Shire of Mount Morgan was of particular concern. On 15 March 2008, the City and Shires formally ceased to exist, and elections were held on the same day to elect councillors and a mayor to the Regional Council.

In 2012, a proposal was made to de-amalgamate the Shire of Livingstone from the Rockhampton Region. On 9 March 2013, the citizens of the former Livingstone shire voted in a referendum to de-amalgamate. The Shire of Livingstone was re-established on 1 January 2014.

=== 2019 proposal to transfer three localities from the Shire of Livingstone ===
In 2019, a proposal was put forward that the localities of Glenlee, Rockyview and Glendale (all within the Shire of Livingstone) should become part of the Rockhampton Region. The main rationales for the change were that these localities lay in the path of suburban growth to the north of Rockhampton and that the residents of these localities used the services and facilities within the Rockhampton Region rather than those of the Shire of Livingstone. The proposal highlighted the different planning priorities between the two local governments with Rockhampton Region wishing to develop more suburban housing and associated amenities with smaller land parcels, while the Shire of Livingstone preferred to have larger land parcels to retain its rural and rural residential character. Given the unpopularity of the forced 2008 amalgamation, there was suspicion among shire residents that the proposal was another attempt to achieve amalgamation through progressive loss of localities to the Rockhampton Region. Following a number of investigations and public consultations, it was decided in October 2022 not to change the local government boundaries.

== Divisions and elections ==
The Council consists of a Mayor and seven Councillors. The Mayor is elected by the public, and the Councillors are elected from seven single-member divisions using an optional preferential voting system. Elections are held every four years.

== Mayors ==
- 2008–2012: Brad Carter
- 2012–2020: Margaret Strelow
- 2020–2021: Neil Fisher (acting)
- 2021–present: Tony Williams

=== Resignation of Margaret Strelow ===
Margaret Strelow resigned the mayoralty on Monday 9 November 2020, following an adverse finding at the Councillor Conduct Tribunal. The misconduct finding related to non-disclosure, or incorrect disclosure, of corporate hospitality received by mining company Adani during a trip to India as part of a delegation of Mayors from Regional Queensland. Strelow publicly stated that she refuted the findings, and that her refusal to agree to having been personally compromised was a matter of personal integrity, but that she had resigned her position in light of the findings.

Following an amendment made to the Local Government Act 2009 (Qld) only a few months prior, Strelow's resignation less than 12 months after being elected meant that the position of Mayor would immediately pass to the runner-up from the Mayoral election of March 2020. The only other candidate in that election had been local environmental activist, Chris "Pineapple" Hooper, who had received less than a third of votes cast in the election. Following uproar over Hooper's "accidental" elevation to the Mayoralty, Local Government Minister Stirling Hinchliffe announced the following day that the Queensland Government would amend the Act to roll back the changes and force a by-election for the role of Mayor as soon as the newly-elected Queensland Parliament had been sworn in.

Following Strelow's resignation as Mayor, it was announced that Deputy Mayor Neil Fisher would fill the role of Acting Mayor until a replacement had been elected.

On 4 February 2021, Tony Williams was elected as mayor.

In 2024, Strelow was exonerated as a review by QCAT found that the official hospitality was not required to have been listed on the particular register in question. It also commented that it was "clearly highly regrettable that this matter has taken so long to be dealt with".

== Suburbs, towns and localities ==
The Rockhampton Region includes the following settlements:

Rockhampton area

- Allenstown
- Berserker
- Depot Hill
- Fairy Bower
- Frenchville
- Kawana
- Koongal
- Lakes Creek^{*}
- Limestone Creek
- Mount Archer
- Norman Gardens
- Park Avenue
- Parkhurst
- Port Curtis
- Rockhampton City
- The Common
- The Range
- Wandal
- West Rockhampton

Mount Morgan area

- Mount Morgan
- Baree
- Hamilton Creek
- Horse Creek
- Moongan
- The Mine
- Walterhall

Fitzroy area

- Gracemere
- Alton Downs
- Bajool
- Bouldercombe
- Bushley
- Dalma
- Garnant
- Glenroy
- Gogango
- Kabra
- Kalapa
- Marmor
- Midgee
- Morinish
- Morinish South
- Nine Mile
- Pink Lily
- Port Alma
- Ridgelands
- Stanwell
- Westwood
- Wycarbah

^{*} - shared with the Shire of Livingstone

== Demographics ==
The populations given relate to the component entities prior to 2008. The census in 2011 was the first for the new Region, while the census in 2016 reflects the deamalgamation of the Shire of Livingstone.

Year	Total Region	Rockhampton	Livingstone	Fitzroy	Mt Morgan
1933	44,501	29,369	6,472	4,256	4,404
1947	50,167	34,988	6,452	3,773	4,954
1954	56,315	40,670	7,031	3,554	5,060
1961	59,895	44,128	7,320	3,576	4,871
1966	61,874	46,083	7,780	3,590	4,421
1971	66,160	49,164	9,595	3,434	3,967
1976	69,675	51,133	11,634	3,441	3,467
1981	75,875	52,383	15,711	4,645	3,136
1986	82,142	56,742	15,886	6,406	3,108
1991	89,868	59,394	19,334	8,047	3,093
1996	96,885	59,732	24,796	9,499	2,858
2001	97,728	58,382	27,017	9,553	2,776
2006	102,048	59,943	28,870	10,310	2,925
2011	109,336				
2016	79,726				
2021	81,968				

== Council facilities ==
Rockhampton Regional Council operates a headquarters public library at 230 Bolsover Street, Rockhampton ("Southside"). Branch libraries are located in Berserker ("Rockhampton North"), Gracemere, Mount Morgan and West Rockhampton ("Anytime" at Rockhampton Airport).

The council owns six business units which are city-owned enterprises managed on commercial lines:

- Rockhampton International Airport
- Fitzroy River Water
- Rockhampton Showgrounds
- Gracemere Saleyards
- Pilbeam Theatre
- Rockhampton Regional Art Gallery
