= Nine Mile, Queensland =

Nine Mile
- Suburb
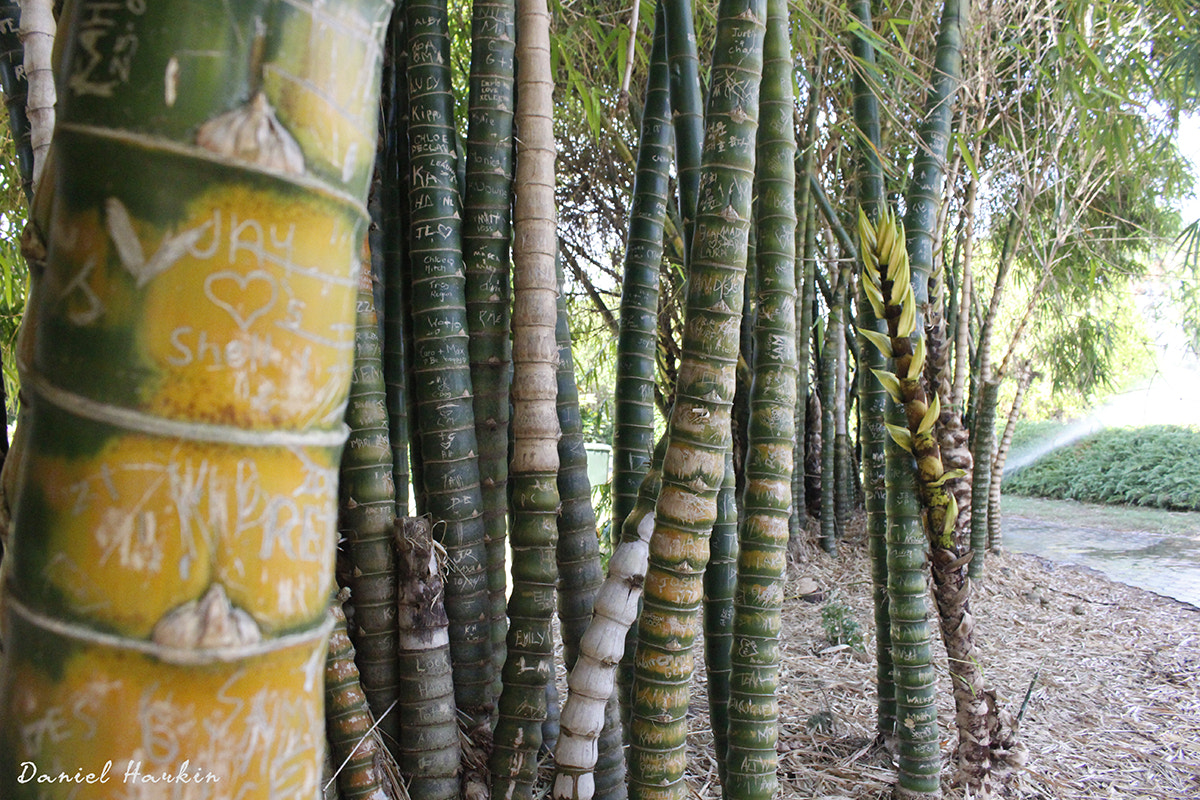

- Interactive map of Nine Mile
- Coordinates: 23.4136°S 150.3491°E
- Country: Australia
- State: Queensland
- LGA: Rockhampton Region
- Location: 17.1 km (10.6 mi) W of Rockhampton; 652 km (405 mi) NNW of Brisbane

Government
  - State electorate: Mirani
  - Federal division: Flynn

Area
  - Total: 130.9 km^{2} (50.5 sq mi)

Population
  - Total: 84 (2021 census)
  - Density: 0.642/km^{2} (1.662/sq mi)
- Time zone: UTC+10:00 (AEST)
- Postcode: 4702
Suburbs around Nine Mile
Dalma	Alton Downs	Pink Lily
Stanwell	Nine Mile	Fairy Bower
Stanwell	Kabra	Gracemere

Nine Mile is a rural locality in the Rockhampton Region, Queensland, Australia. In the 2021 census, Nine Mile had a population of 84 people.

== Geography ==
The land use is predominantly grazing on native vegetation.

== History ==
Nine Mine Provisional School opened on 8 July 1901 as a half-time school in conjunction with Lavendale Provisional School, sharing one teacher between them. In 1908, Woodville Provisional School opened and the teacher was shared between all three schools. In 1909, Nine Mile Provisional School closed due to low student numbers.

== Demographics ==
In the 2016 census, Nine Mile had a population of 77 people.

In the 2021 census, Nine Mile had a population of 84 people.

== Education ==
There are no schools in Nine Mile. The nearest government primary schools are Gracemere State School in neighbouring Gracemere to the south-east and Stanwell State School in neighbouring Stanwell to the south-west. The nearest government secondary school is Rockhampton State High School in Wandal, Rockhampton to the north-east.

== Paradise Lagoons Campdraft ==
An annual campdrafting event called the Paradise Lagoons Campdraft is held in Paradise Lagoons pastoral property 973 Malchi Nine Mile Road (23.3866°S 150.3836°E). A multi-million dollar, purpose-built facility was opened in 2003 when the event was inaugurated by Graeme Acton who died following a campdrafting accident at Clarke Creek in 2014. Acton's funeral was held at Paradise Lagoons in Nine Mile which was attended by numerous dignitaries including then-Prime Minister Tony Abbott, who had attended the campdraft the previous year prior to becoming prime minister.
