= Wycarbah =

- Suburb
- Interactive map of Wycarbah
- Coordinates: 23.495°S 150.0955°E
- Country: Australia
- State: Queensland
- LGA: Rockhampton Region
- Location: 12.3 km (7.6 mi) NE of Westwood; 13.9 km (8.6 mi) SW of Stanwell; 39.6 km (24.6 mi) SW of Rockhampton CBD; 660 km (410 mi) NNW of Brisbane

Government
  - State electorate: Mirani
  - Federal division: Flynn

Area
  - Total: 214.0 km^{2} (82.6 sq mi)

Population
  - Total: 36 (2021 census)
  - Density: 0.1682/km^{2} (0.436/sq mi)
- Time zone: UTC+10:00 (AEST)
- Postcode: 4702
Suburbs around Wycarbah
Gogango	Morinish South	Morinish South
Gogango	Wycarbah	Kalapa
Gogango	Westwood	Bushley

Wycarbah is a rural locality in the Rockhampton Region, Queensland, Australia. In the 2021 census, Wycarbah had a population of 36 people.

== Geography ==
The Fitzroy River passes through the north-west of the locality, entering from the north-west (Gogango) and exiting to the north (Morinish South).

The Blackwater railway line enters the locality from the south-east (Bushley) and exits to the south (Westwood) with Wycarbah railway station serving the locality (23.5466°S 150.2150°E). Kakoma railway station is an abandoned railway station on the line (23.5333°S 150.2262°E).

The Capricorn Highway enters the locality from the east (Kalapa) and exits to the south (Westwood). It runs loosely parallel and south of the railway line.

The land use is predominantly grazing on native vegetation.

== History ==
Rosewood Crossing Provisional School opened on 31 July 1876. In 1892, it was renamed Wycarbah Provisional School. A new school building was erected in 1890. On 1 January 1909, it became Wycarbah State School. It closed on 27 November 1935 with the students transferred to Kalapa State School in neighbouring Kalapa. In 1939, the school building was auctioned for removal. It was at 14 Wycarbah Road (23.54446°S 150.21271°E).

Wycarbah Hall opened in September 1926.

== Demographics ==
In the 2016 census, Wycarbah had a population of 49 people.

In the 2021 census, Wycarbah had a population of 36 people.

== Education ==
There are no schools in Wycarbah. The nearest government primary schools are Westwood State School in neighbouring Westwood to the south and Stanwell State School in Stanwell to the east. The nearest government secondary school is Rockhampton State High School in Wandal, Rockhampton; however, this school would be too distant for students living in the north-west of the locality with distance education and boarding school as the alternatives.

There are also non-government schools in Rockhampton and its suburbs and in Gracemere.

== Amenities ==
Wycarbah Hall is at 47 Rosewood Road (23.54553°S 150.21374°E).
