= Westwood, Queensland =

Westwood
- Town
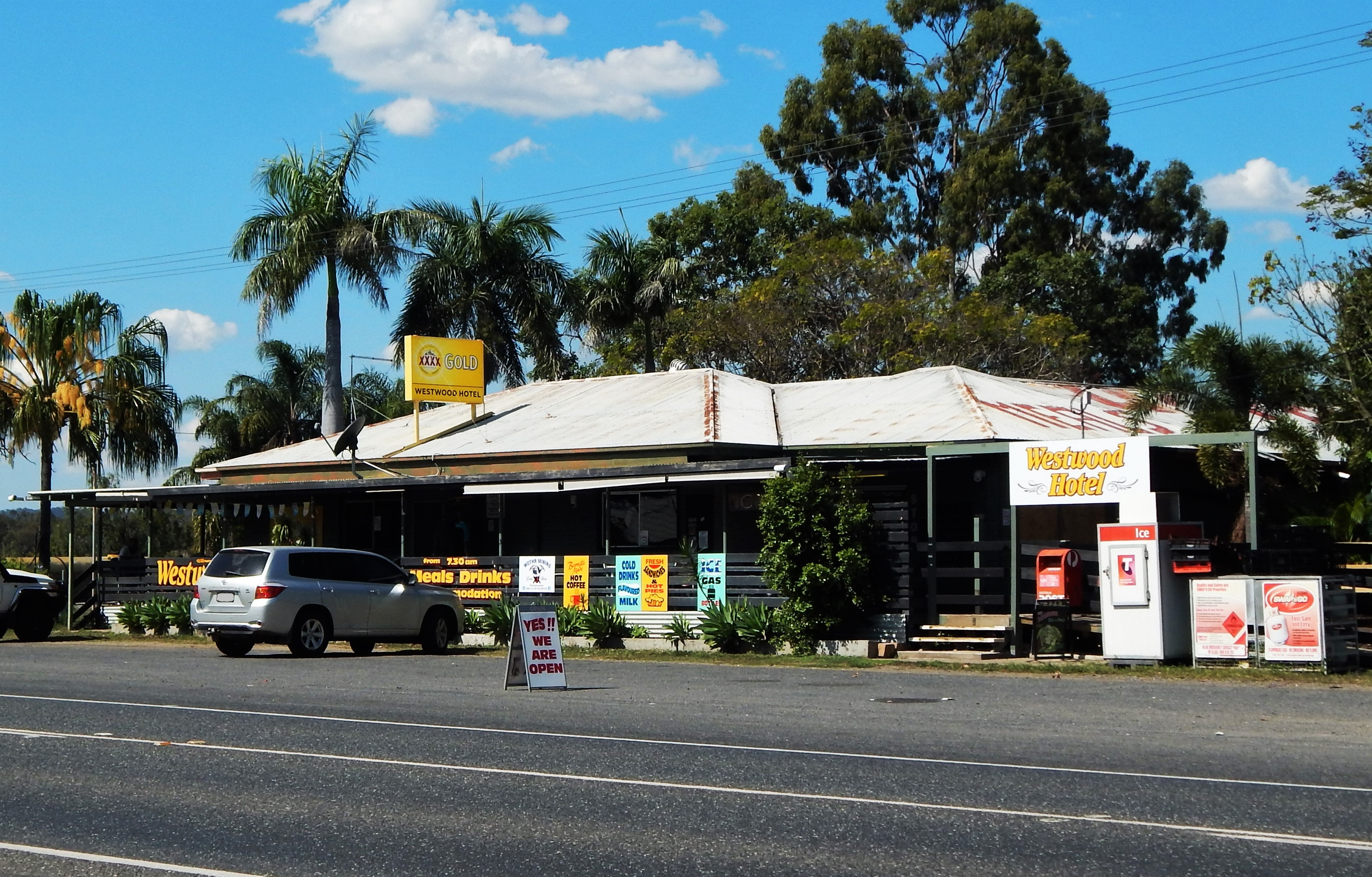
- Westwood Hotel, 2022

- Interactive map of Westwood
- Coordinates: 23.6144°S 150.1566°E
- Country: Australia
- State: Queensland
- LGAs: Rockhampton Region; Shire of Banana
- Location: 40.7 km (25.3 mi) SW of Gracemere; 50.5 km (31.4 mi) SW of Rockhampton; 677 km (421 mi) NNW of Brisbane

Government
  - State electorate: Mirani
  - Federal division: Flynn

Area
  - Total: 445.6 km^{2} (172.0 sq mi)

Population
  - Total: 199 (2021 census)
  - Density: 0.4466/km^{2} (1.1567/sq mi)
- Time zone: UTC+10:00 (AEST)
- Postcode: 4702
Localities around Westwood
Gogango	Wycarbah	Bushley
Gogango	Westwood	Boulder Creek; Oakey Creek
Pheasant Creek	Dululu	Wura

Westwood is a town in the Rockhampton Region and a locality split between the Rockhampton Region and the Shire of Banana in Queensland, Australia. It was the first town that was gazetted by the Queensland Government. In the 2021 census, the locality of Westwood had a population of 199 people.

== Geography ==
The northern half of the locality of Westwood is in Rockhampton region while the southern part is in the Shire of Banana.

The town is in the south-east of the locality with two other neighbourhoods in the north-east of locality

- Huxham (23.6°S 150.1666°E). It takes its name from the Huxham railway station, which in turn was named on 21 August 1919 by the Queensland Railways Department after John Saunders Huxham, the Home Secretary of Queensland.
- Spring Creek (23.5833°S 150.1666°E)

The Capricorn Highway passes through the town, and the intersection with the Leichhardt Highway is a few kilometres to the southwest.

The Blackwater railway line enters the locality from the north (Wycarbah), passes through the town, and exits to the south-west (Gogango).

Westwood has the following mountains:

- Sugarloaf Mountain in the north-east of the locality (23.56295°S 150.15110°E), rising to 300 metres (980 ft) above sea level
- Norman Head in the north-east of the locality (23.56129°S 150.14965°E), 220 metres (720 ft)
- Cobbler Mountain in the west of the locality (23.60440°S 150.08259°E), 305 metres (1,001 ft)
- Sebastopol Mountain in the south of the locality (23.63979°S 150.14193°E), 314 metres (1,030 ft)

The predominant land use is grazing on native vegetation.

== History ==
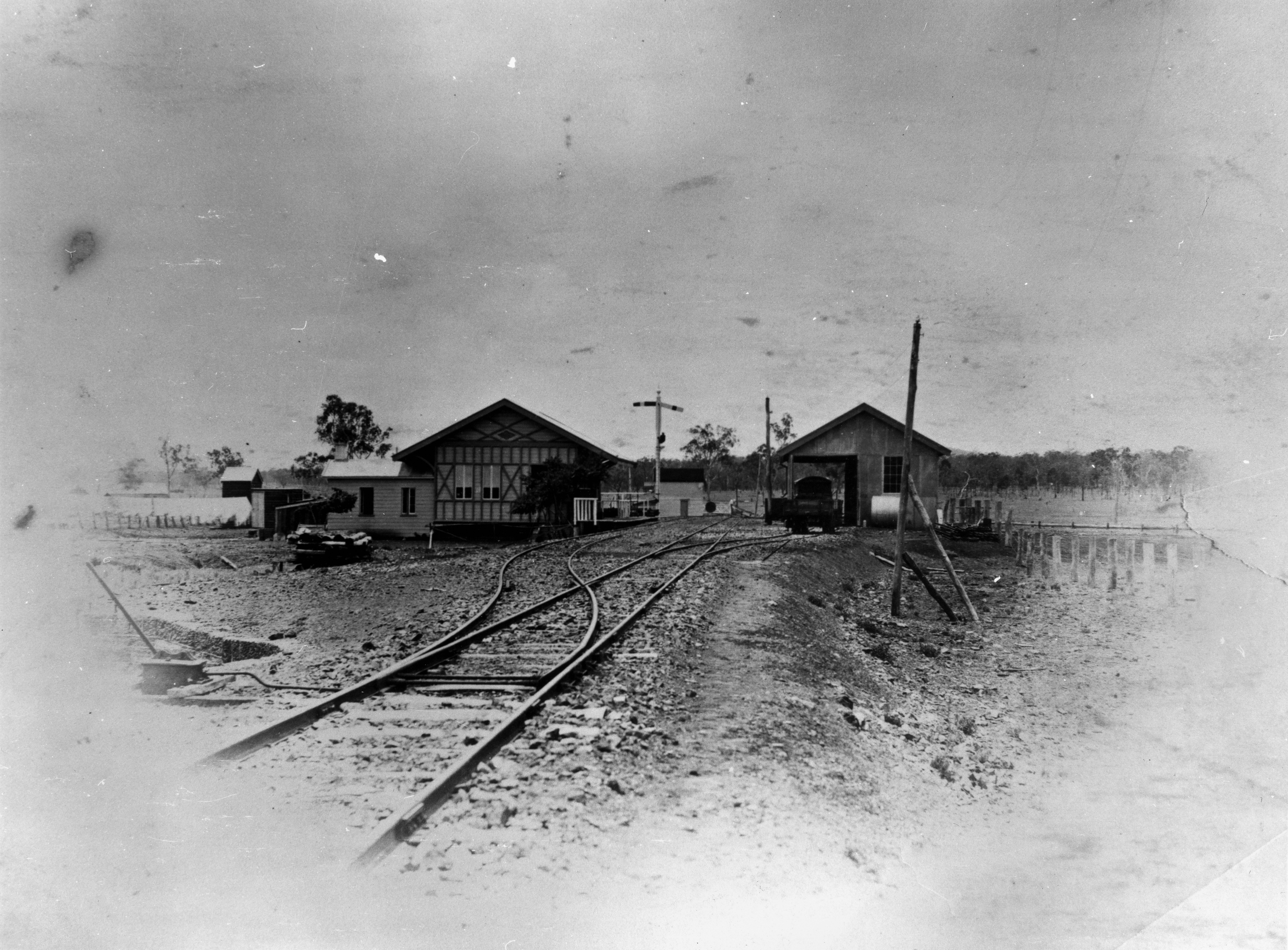
Old Westwood railway station

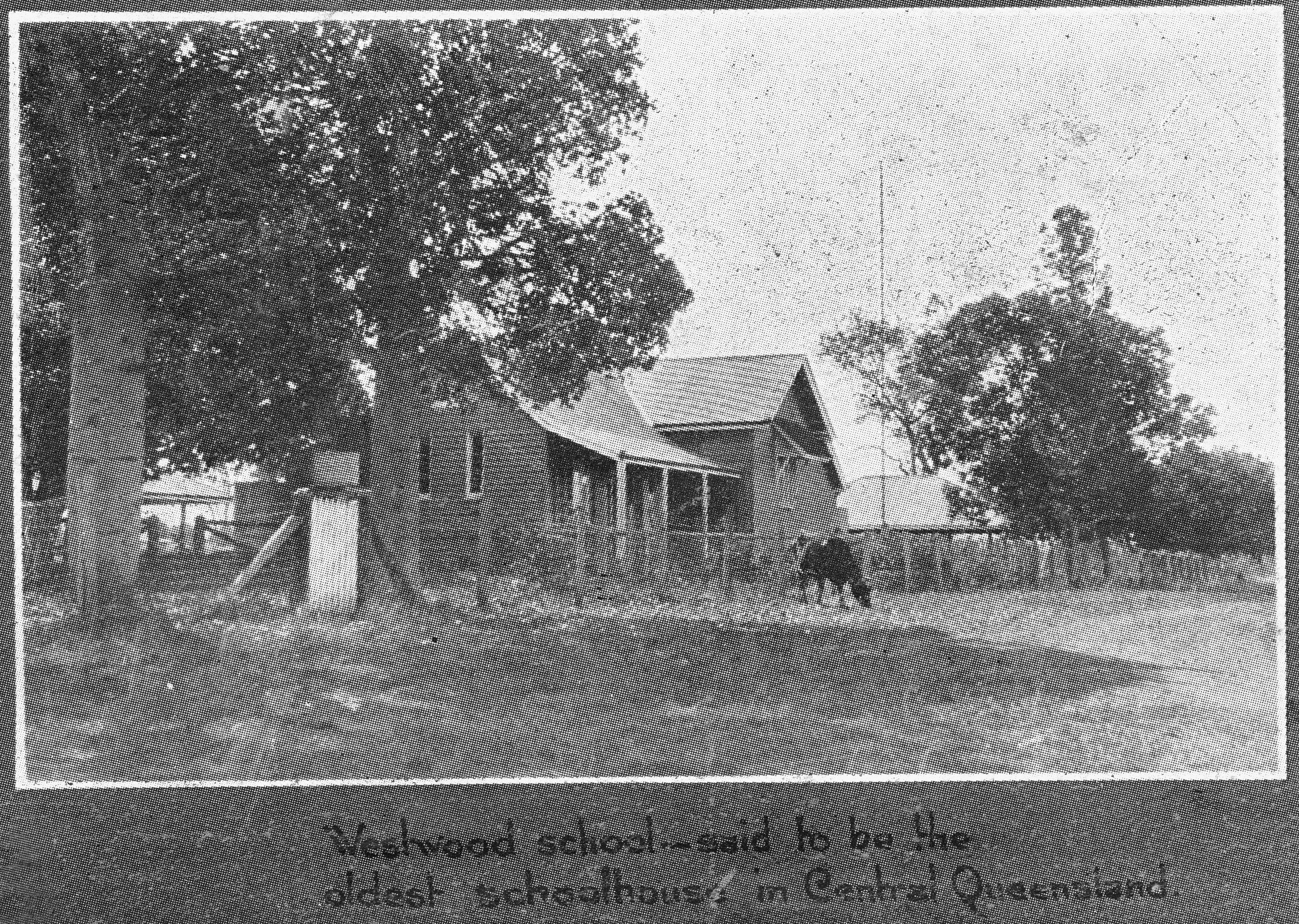
Westwood School, claimed to be the oldest schoolhouse in Central Queensland, 1930

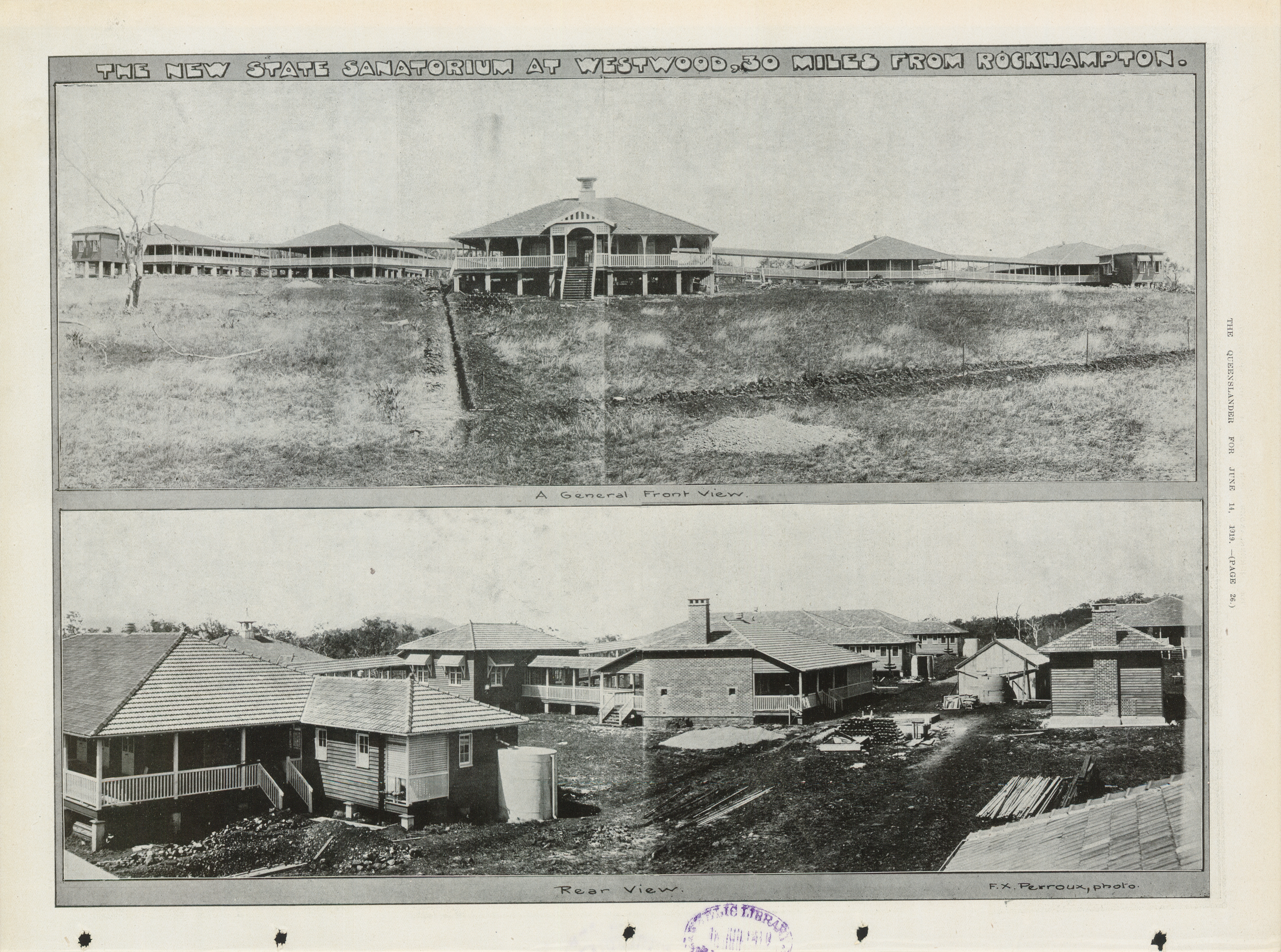
Front and rear views of the new state sanitorium at Westwood, June 1919

Although towns such as Brisbane, Maryborough and Rockhampton had been gazetted by the New South Wales Government prior to the separation of Queensland, Westwood was the first town to be gazetted by the newly established Queensland Government on 23 May 1860. Although the area was named Prestone on the original survey plan, Queensland Governor George Bowen decided to name the town Westwood after Westwood House, the home of Sir John Pakington, the Secretary of State for the Colonies and War in 1852.

On 29 September 1867, the first stage of the Great Northern Railway (now known as the Central Western Line) reached the area from Rockhampton, and Westwood became the railhead. The first load of wool was railed from the town on 23 August.

Westwood State School opened on 26 August 1872.

A Protestant church opened in Westwood on Thursday 2 October 1873.

The town was meant to be the railhead for only a short time. However, bureaucracy and financial difficulties for the state meant that the next section of the line did not commence construction until 1873. The significance of Westwood declined when the railhead moved further west.

On Saturday 6 September 1919, John Huxham, the Queensland Home Secretary opened the Westwood Sanatorium, a 64-bed sanitorium was opened in Westwood to treat miner's phthisis, a lung disease suffered by miners from working in dusty conditions. Later, it treated patients with Tuberculosis. In 1953, a ¾ mile bitumen road was built from the Huxham railway siding (just to the north of Westwood) to the sanitorium and named Haigh Drive in memory of Leonard Garfield Haigh, the former chairman of the Rockhampton Hospitals Board from 2 June 1933 to 16 February 1953. Commencing with a tiled-roof waiting shed at the siding with a plaque commemorating Haigh, the drive to the sanitorium was flanked with Peltophorum trees and was officially opened by James Larcombe (MLA for Rockhampton) in the presence of Haigh's widow on Sunday 1 November 1953. More effective medical treatments for tuberculous resulted in the closure of the sanitorium in 1959, but the building continued to be used as a nursing home until the 1980s. The sanitorium buildings were then relocated or demolished; one is in use as a private home in Emerald.

In 1996, Westwood held its first Anzac Day ceremony at its new memorial which was dedicated the same day. The event, organised by the Westwood Progress Association, was attended by approximately 80 people including official guests Fitzroy Shire mayor Mary Seierup, state MP Jim Pearce and federal MP Paul Marek. Fitzroy Shire councillor Vince Reynolds was the master of ceremonies while Uniting Church pastor Dorothy Demack served as the worship leader.

Westwood was in the Shire of Fitzroy until local government amalgamations in 2008 resulted in it being in the Rockhampton Region.

== Demographics ==
In the 2006 census, the locality of Westwood and the surrounding area had a population of 253 people.

In the 2011 census, the locality of Westwood had a population of 240 people.

In the 2016 census, the locality of Westwood had a population of 174 people.

In the 2021 census, the locality of Westwood had a population of 199 people.

== Heritage listings ==
Westwood has the following heritage-listed sites:

- remains of the Adolphus William Copper Smelter

== Education ==
Westwood State School is a government primary (Prep–6) school for boys and girls at 108 Herbert Street (23.6173°S 150.1545°E). In 2017, the school had an enrolment of 13 students with 2 teachers (1 full-time equivalent) and 4 non-teaching staff (2 full-time equivalent). In 2022, the school had 20 students.

There are no secondary schools in Westwood. The nearest government secondary school is Rockhampton State High School in Wandal, Rockhampton to the north-east.
