= Glenroy, Queensland =

Glenroy
- Suburb
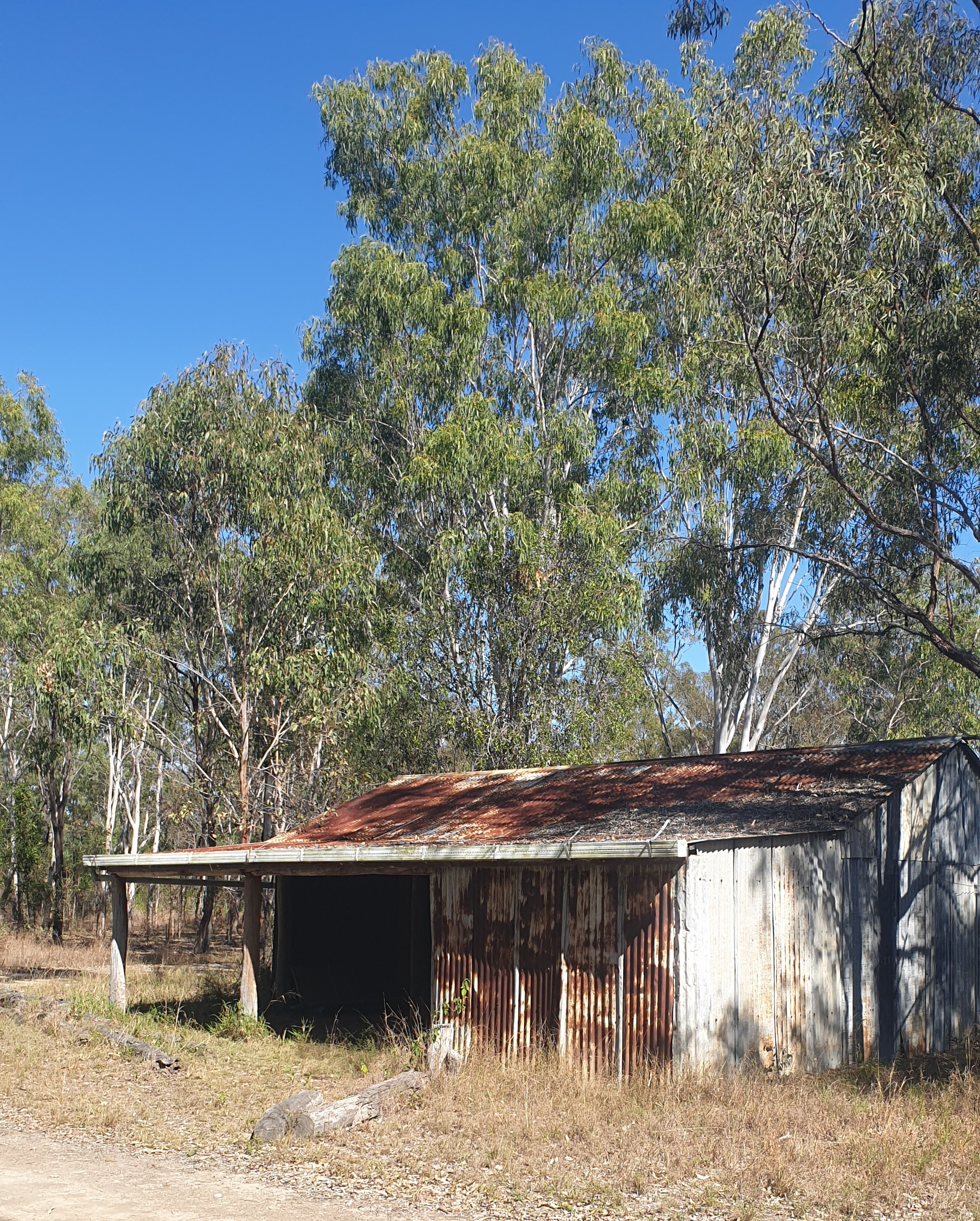
- Goodedulla National Park, 2023

- Interactive map of Glenroy
- Coordinates: 23.1861°S 149.815°E
- Country: Australia
- State: Queensland
- LGA: Rockhampton Region
- Location: 45.5 km (28.3 mi) W of Ridgelands; 55.5 km (34.5 mi) S of Marlborough; 75.3 km (46.8 mi) NW of Rockhampton CBD; 715 km (444 mi) NNW of Brisbane

Government
  - State electorate: Mirani
  - Federal division: Flynn

Area
  - Total: 875.8 km^{2} (338.1 sq mi)

Population
  - Total: 19 (2021 census)
  - Density: 0.0217/km^{2} (0.0562/sq mi)
- Time zone: UTC+10:00 (AEST)
- Postcode: 4702
Suburbs around Glenroy
Marlborough	Marlborough	Canoona
Balcomba	Glenroy	Morinish
Balcomba	Gogango	Morinish South

Glenroy is a rural locality in the Rockhampton Region, Queensland, Australia. In the 2021 census, Glenroy had a population of 19 people.

== Geography ==
The Fitzroy River forms most of the eastern boundary of the locality, entering from the south-east (Gogango / Morinish South) and exiting to the north-east (Canoona / Morinish).

The Goodedulla National Park is in the west and south-west of the locality. Immediately to the north of the national park is the Develin State Forest in the north-west of the locality. Apart from these protected areas, the land use is predominantly grazing on native vegetation.

== History ==
The Goodedulla National Park was gazetted in 1994.

== Demographics ==
In the 2016 census, Glenroy had a population of 28 people.

In the 2021 census, Glenroy had a population of 19 people.

== Education ==
There are no schools in Glenroy. The nearest government primary schools are Marlborough State School in neighbouring Marlborough to the north and Ridgelands State School in Ridgelands to the east. However, some students in the south of the locality would be too distant to attend these schools. Also, there are no secondary schools nearby. The alternatives are distance education and boarding school.
