= Gogango =

- Town
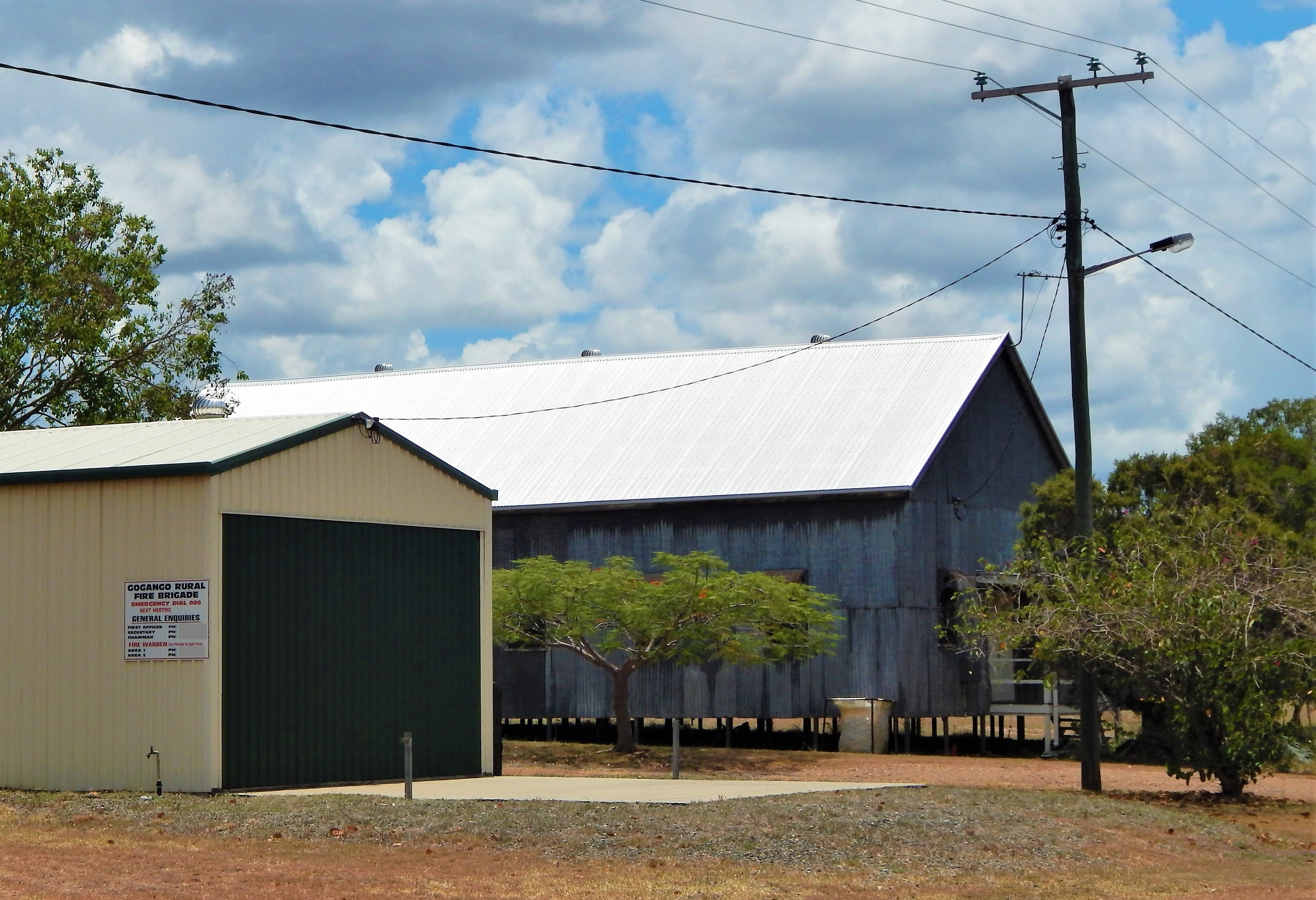
- Buildings in Wills Street, Gogango: rural fire brigade shed (left) and community hall (right)

- Interactive map of Gogango
- Coordinates: 23.6666°S 150.0422°E
- Country: Australia
- State: Queensland
- LGA: Rockhampton Region
- Location: 65.7 km (40.8 mi) SW of Rockhampton; 615 km (382 mi) NNW of Brisbane

Government
  - State electorate: Mirani
  - Federal division: Flynn

Area
  - Total: 791.9 km^{2} (305.8 sq mi)

Population
  - Total: 184 (2021 census)
  - Density: 0.2324/km^{2} (0.6018/sq mi)
- Time zone: UTC+10:00 (AEST)
- Postcode: 4702
Localities around Gogango
Balcomba	Glenroy	Morinish South
Duaringa	Gogango	Wycarbah
Boolburra	Gainsford; Pheasant Creek	Westwood

Gogango is a rural town and locality in the Rockhampton Region, Queensland, Australia. In the 2021 census, the locality of Gogango had a population of 184 people.

== Geography ==
Gogango is in Central Queensland. The Capricorn Highway traverses the south of the locality passing through the town which is situated in the south-east corner of the locality. The Central Western railway line also traverses the south of the locality mostly parallel and to the immediate north of the highway. The town is serviced by Gogango railway station (23.6653°S 150.0404°E), while Grantleigh railway station (23.7013°S 149.9951°E) serves the south-west of the locality.

The Fitzroy River flows from west to east through the centre of the locality. Gogango Creek flows from south to north through the town and is a tributary of the Fitzroy River.

The principal land use is farming, mostly grazing cattle.

== History ==
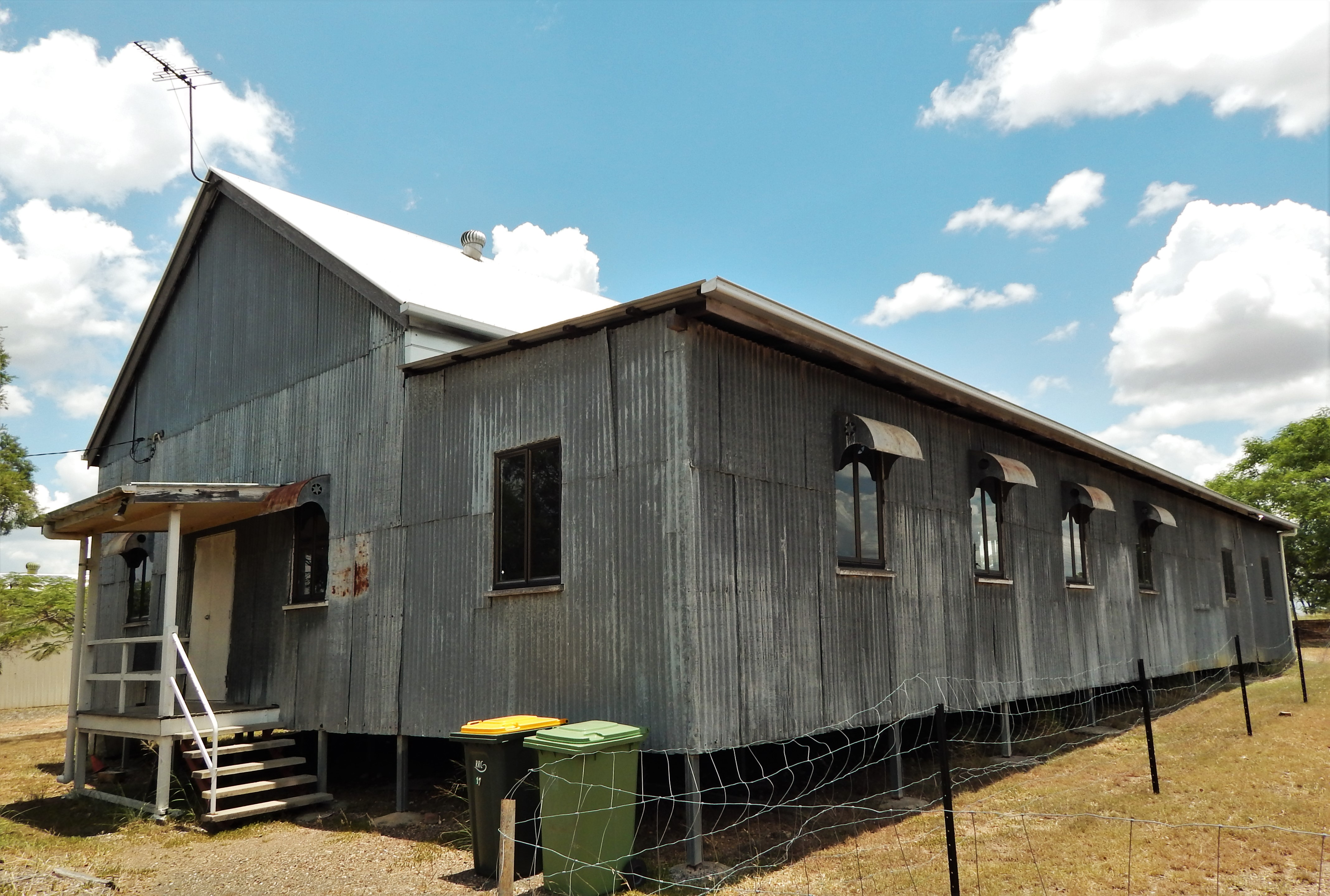
Gogango Hall, 2018

Goganjo Provisional School opened in 1874 but closed circa 1878. In 1888 it renamed under the name Gogango Provisional School (note change of spelling) becoming Gogango State School on 1 January 1909.

On 29 November 1950, the Gogango Hall held an Ambulance Ball. People from Westwood, Mt Morgan and Rockhampton attended.

In the 2010–11 Queensland floods the Fitzroy River which passes through the area of Gogango rose to 28 metres. Gogango Creek also flooded, stopping traffic on the Capricorn Highway.

The Capricorn Highway was also flooded for more than 12 hours in January 2013.

In February 2015, Cyclone Marcia caused heavy rainfall which led to Gogango Creek rising over the highway.

== Demographics ==
In the 2011 census, the locality of Gogango and the surrounding areas had a population of 310 people.

In the 2016 census, the locality of Gogango had a population of 111 people.

In the 2021 census, the locality of Gogango had a population of 184 people.

== Infrastructure ==
The Rookwood Weir (Darumbal: Managibei Gamu) is a concrete weir located on the Fitzroy River in the Gogango area, approximately 15 kilometres (9.3 mi) from the township. Opened in 2023, the weir has a maximum capacity of 80,000 megalitres (65,000 acre⋅ft). Completed in two stages, the weir is 17.5 metres (57 ft) high and inundated 1,930 hectares (4,800 acres).

== Economy ==
There are a number of homesteads in the locality, including:

- Rookwood (23.4618°S 149.8366°E)
- Separation (23.5873°S 149.7834°E)
- Weir Park (23.5386°S 149.9798°E)
- Yarra (23.5585°S 149.8846°E)

== Transport ==
There are a number of airstrips in the locality, all of them associated with the homesteads:

- Rookwood airstrip (23.4671°S 149.8324°E)
- Separation airstrip (23.5934°S 149.7813°E)
- Weir Park airstrip (23.5406°S 149.9808°E)
- Yarra airstrip (23.5614°S 149.8839°E)

== Education ==
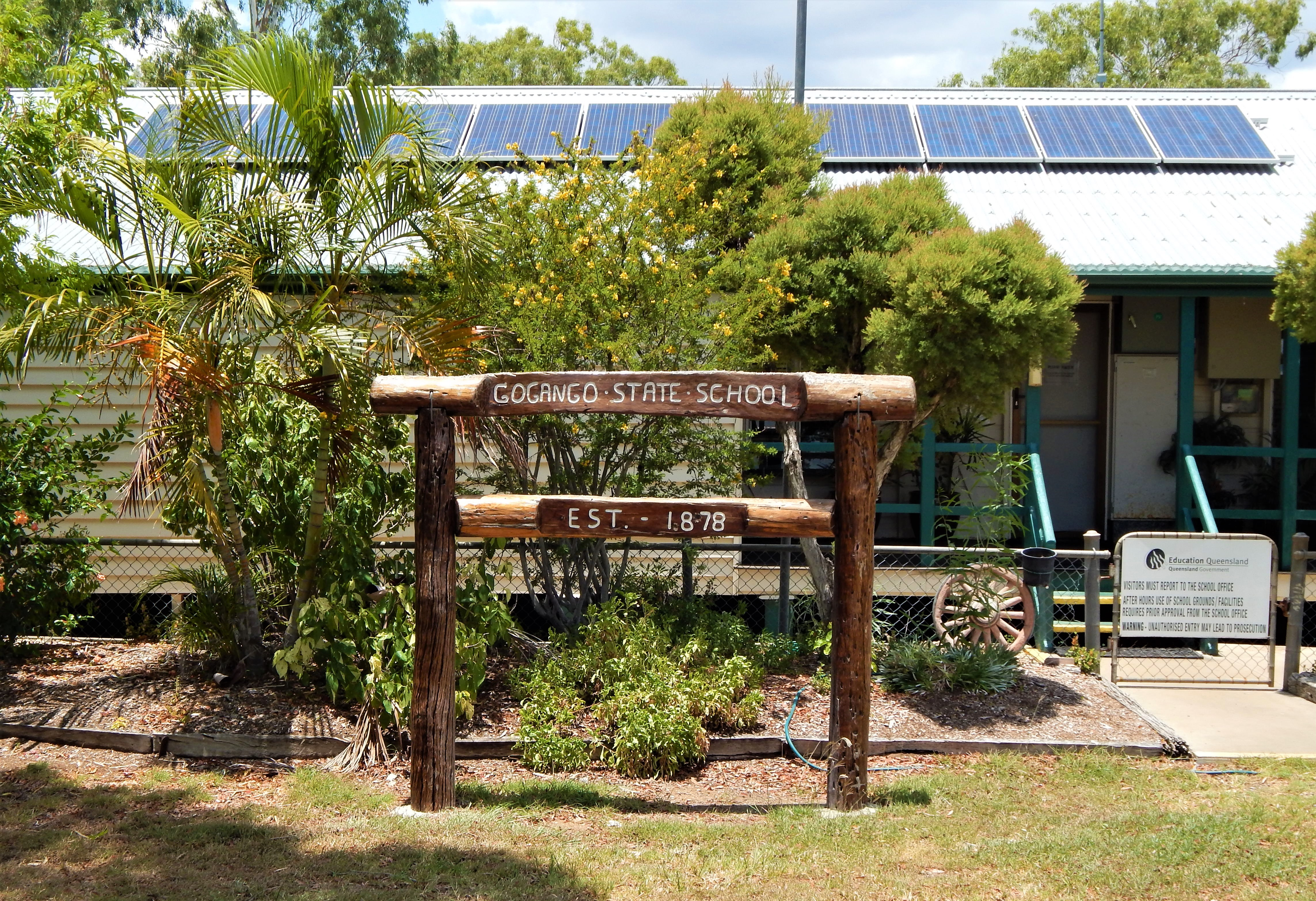
Gogango State School, 2018

Gogango State School is a government primary (Prep–6) school for boys and girls at 10 Wills Street (23.6647°S 150.0444°E). In 2016, the school had an enrolment of 9 students with 3 teachers (1 full-time equivalent) and 4 non-teaching staff (2 full-time equivalent). In 2018, the school had an enrolment of 7 students with 4 teachers (2 full-time equivalent) and 4 non-teaching staff (1 full-time equivalent).

There is no secondary school in Gogango. The nearest state secondary school is Rockhampton State High School in Wandal in Rockhampton to the north-east. A school bus service is available.

== Facilities ==
Dunphy Park is at the corner of Third Street and Wills Street (23.6665°S 150.0412°E). It has picnic tables and shade areas.

There is a community hall where the Gogango Honour Roll is displayed.

There is a volunteer rural fire brigade.

== Notable people ==
- Barry O'Sullivan, Australian Senator, was born in Gogango
