= Stanwell, Queensland =

Stanwell
- Town
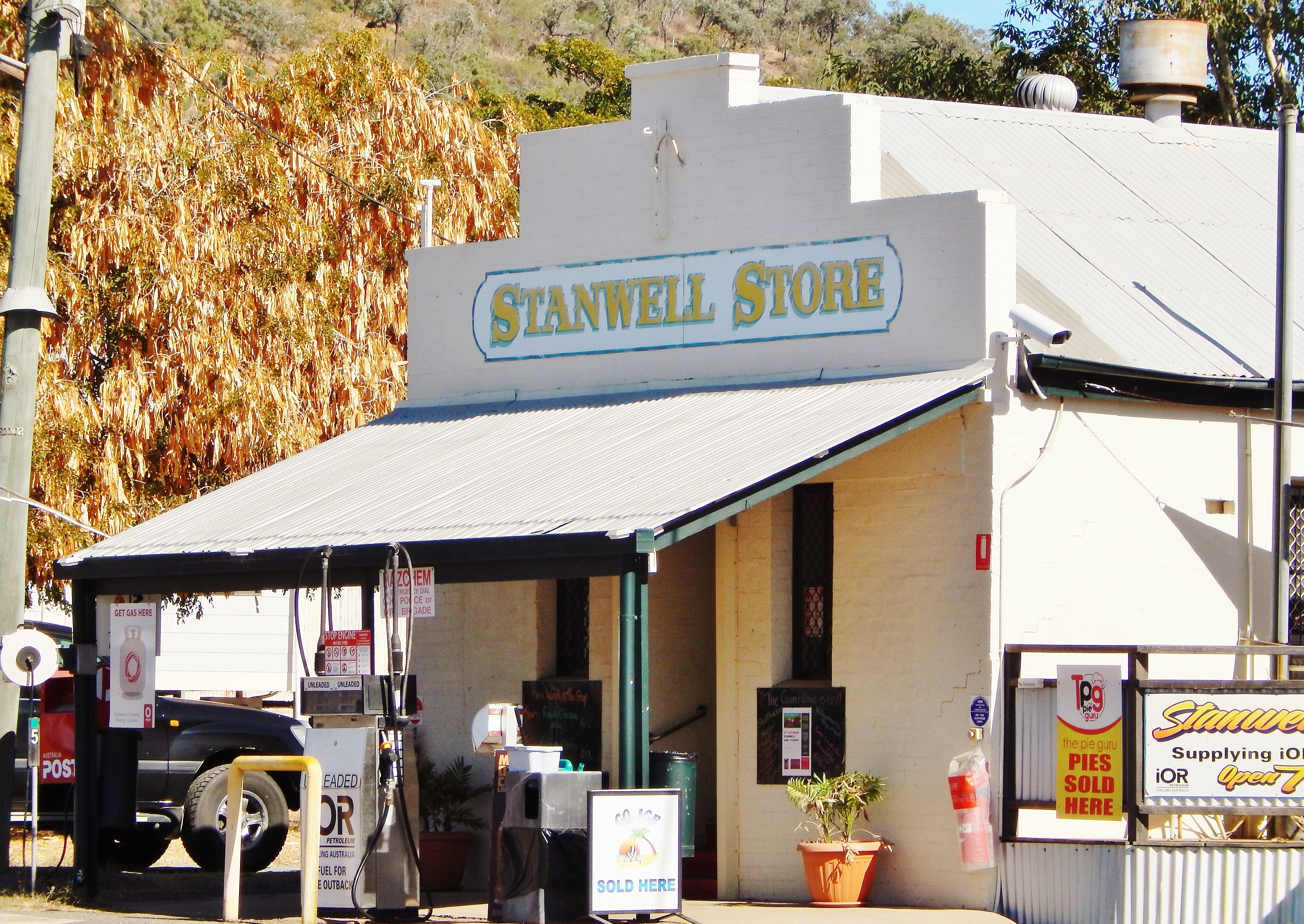
- Stanwell Store, 2017

- Interactive map of Stanwell
- Coordinates: 23.4836°S 150.3286°E
- Country: Australia
- State: Queensland
- LGA: Rockhampton Region
- Location: 26.2 km (16.3 mi) SE of Rockhampton CBD; 31.8 km (19.8 mi) NNW of Mount Morgan; 628 km (390 mi) NNW of Brisbane

Government
  - State electorate: Mirani
  - Federal division: Flynn

Area
  - Total: 136.5 km^{2} (52.7 sq mi)

Population
  - Total: 301 (2021 census)
  - Density: 2.205/km^{2} (5.711/sq mi)
- Time zone: UTC+10:00 (AEST)
- Postcode: 4702
Localities around Stanwell
Kalapa	Dalma	Nine Mile
Bushley	Stanwell	Kabra; Bouldercombe
Boulder Creek	Boulder Creek	The Mine

Stanwell is a rural town and locality in the Rockhampton Region, Queensland, Australia. In the 2021 census, the locality of Stanwell had a population of 301 people.

== Geography ==
Stanwell is located on the Capricorn Highway and the Central Western railway line. Neerkol Creek flows past the town.

== History ==
Early settlers in the Stanwell area were involved in dairying, quarrying or working for the railways.

Stanwell State School opened on 7 November 1873.

A postal receiving office opened in about 1874; a post office opened on 1 October 1880.

A Primitive Methodist Church opened in Stanwell on Saturday 13 August 1881 by the Reverend R. Hartley. Although the land was provided by the Methodists, other denominations contributed to the construction of the church as part of an arrangement whereby the other denominations could also use the church for their services.

In 1893, a quarry leased by Bishop John Cani was used to provide sandstone for the construction of St Josephs Roman Catholic Cathedral in Rockhampton.

An honour board was erected in the School of Arts Hall to honour those who served in World War I and World War II.

Construction of the Stanwell Power Station commenced in 1993 and it became operational in 1996.

== Demographics ==
In the 2011 census, the locality of Stanwell had a population of 303 people.

In the 2016 census, the locality of Stanwell had a population of 337 people.

In the 2021 census, the locality of Stanwell had a population of 301 people.

== Economy ==
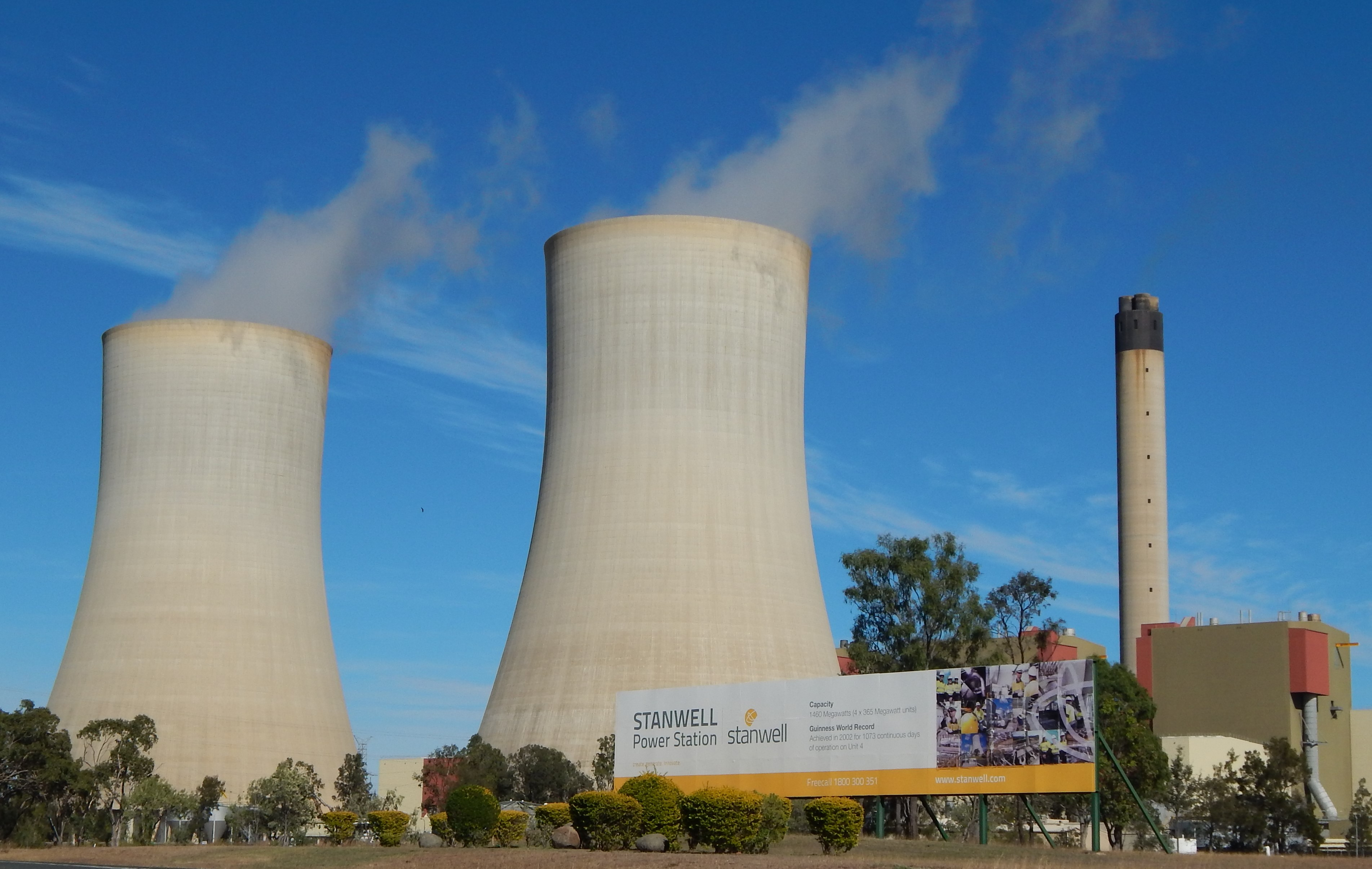
Stanwell Power Station, 2017

The Stanwell Power Station is located in Stanwell. It is located on 1,600 hectares (4,000 acres) of land to the south-west of the town.

== Education ==
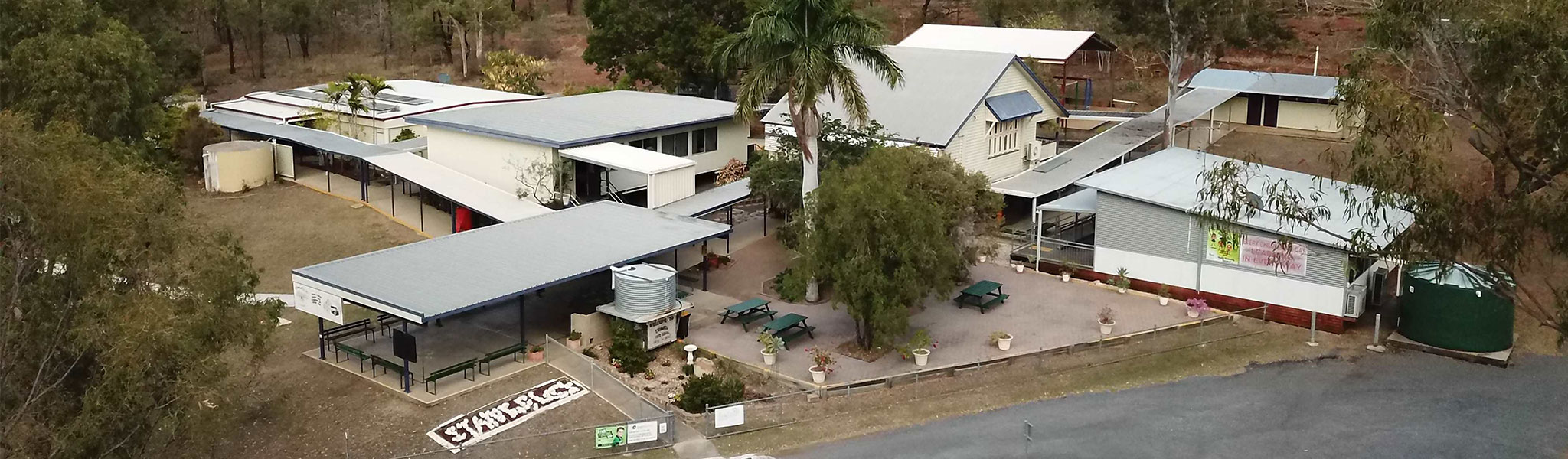
Stanwell State School, 2025

Stanwell State School is a government primary (Prep-6) school for boys and girls at 10 Teakle Street (23.4852°S 150.3215°E). In 2012, the school had an enrolment of 38 students with 3 teachers (2.5 full-time equivalent). In 2018, the school had an enrolment of 27 students with 4 teachers (3 full-time equivalent) and 5 non-teaching staff (3 full-time equivalent). The school motto is 'Study, service, sincerity'.

There is no secondary school in Stanwell. The nearest government secondary schools are Rockhampton State High School in Wandal, Rockhampton, to the north-east and Mount Morgan State High School in Mount Morgan to the south-east.
