= Rockhampton State High School =

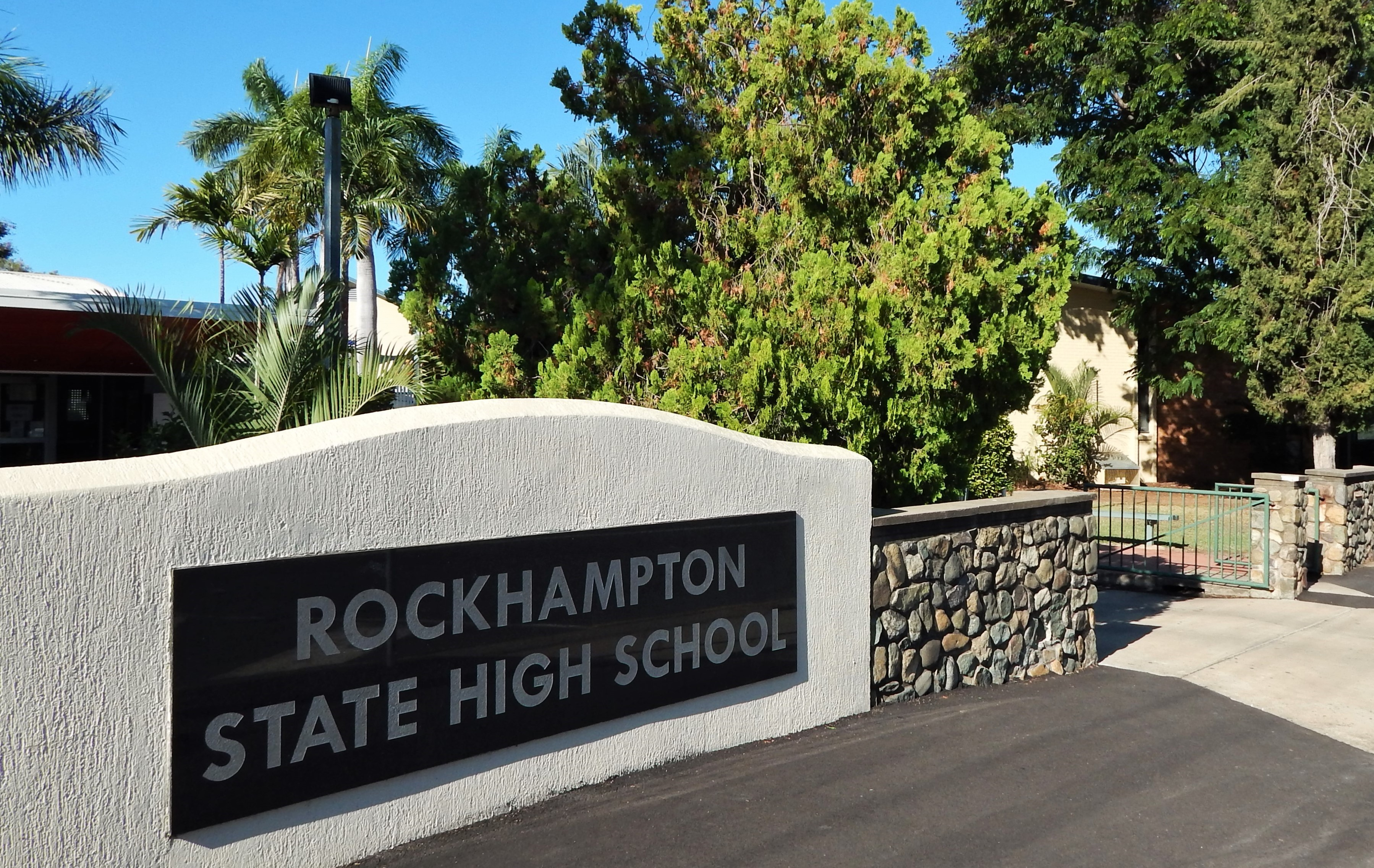
- Rockhampton State High School entrance

Location
- Campbell Street; Wandal, Rockhampton, Queensland; Australia; 23.37°S 150.5°E

Information
- Type: Public, secondary
- Motto: Aere Perennius (More lasting than bronze)
- Established: 1919
- Principal: Matt Newell
- Grades: 7–12
- Enrolment: 1119 (2017)
- Colours: Blue, brown and gold

Rockhampton State High School is a coeducational public secondary school located in Wandal, a suburb of Rockhampton in Queensland, Australia. The school has a total enrolment of more than 1000 students, with an official count of 1119 students in 2017.

Rockhampton State High School's role of the Principal of the School is currently held by Matt Newell. The school also consists of three Deputy Principals, twelve Heads of Department, twelve Year Level Coordinators, one Business Services Manager, two Guidance Officers, one School Chaplain, one School Nurse and 70 teaching staff.

== History ==
Rockhampton State High School opened in conjunction with the Rockhampton Technical College in 1919 under the leadership of Founding Principal John Hill, a former Australian Army major who served in Gallipoli and was awarded for his bravery. Major Hill chose the colours of his old army unit, blue and brown, as the school's official colours, as well as the school motto, Aere Perennius, meaning "More lasting than bronze". The high school conducted its classes in buildings in Bolsover Street and Alma Street until 1962, when the school separated from the Technical College and relocated to its present site in Wandal.

== Vocational Education & Training ==
Vocational Education & Training (VET) courses available to students in Years 11 and 12 include:

- Certificate II in Business (BSB20115)
- Certificate II in Engineering Pathways (MEM20413)
- Certificate II in Hospitality (SIT20213)
- Certificate II in Rural Operations (AHC21216)
- Certificate II in Sport & Recreation (NRL & Netball) (SIS20313)
- Certificate III in Fitness

== Co-curricular activities ==
Co-curricular activities available to students at Rockhampton State High School include:

- Agricultural showing
- Breakfast Club
- Constitutional Conventions
- Dance and Drama projects and performances
- Ecoman
- Indigenous programs (Academic & Talent Aspirations Program, ARTIE, FOGS and QATSIF)
- Inter-school sports
- Junior Secondary excellence programs
- Keyboarding competitions
- Mathematics, English and Science competitions
- Mathematics Team challenge
- Minister’s Arts Awards
- Mooting
- Pierre de Coubertin Award
- Rockhampton/Capricornia/Queensland/Australia representatives at various sports
- Rotary Quiz
- Year 7 lunchtime activities
- Year 11 leadership camp

== Notable alumni ==
- Duncan Armstrong, swimmer, Olympic and Commonwealth Games gold medal winner
- Glen Kelly, politician, state MP for Mirani (2024–present)
- Rod Laver, tennis player, world number one and winner of 11 major titles
- Anna Meares, cyclist, Olympian and Commonwealth Games gold medal winner
- George Pearce, politician, federal MP for Capricornia (1949–1961)
- Rod Reddy, rugby league player and coach, Queensland and Australia representative
- Robert Schwarten, politician, state MP for Rockhampton North (1989–1995) and Rockhampton (1995–2012)
- Dave Tollner, politician, federal MP for Solomon (2001–2007), Northern Territory MP for Fong Lim (2008–2016), Northern Territory Deputy Chief Minister (2013–2014)
- Kenrick Tucker, cyclist, Olympian and Commonwealth Games gold medal winner
- Perc Tucker, politician, state MP for Townsville North (1960–1972) and Townsville West (1972–1974), Queensland leader of the opposition (1974)
