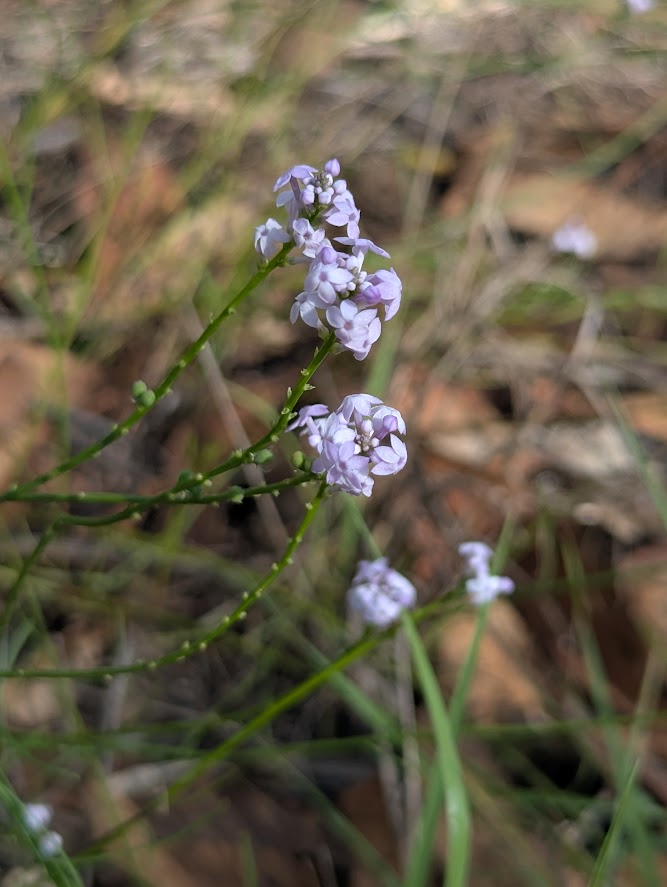

Conservation status
- Near Threatened (NCA)

Scientific classification
- Kingdom: Plantae
- Clade: Tracheophytes
- Clade: Angiosperms
- Clade: Eudicots
- Clade: Rosids
- Order: Celastrales
- Family: Celastraceae
- Genus: Stackhousia
- Species: S. tryonii

Binomial name
- Stackhousia tryonii F.M.Bailey

= Stackhousia tryonii =

Species of shrub

Stackhousia tryonii is a herb which possesses edaphic endemism to ultramafic serpentine soil containing high concentrations of nickel in Central Queensland.

== Description ==
Stackhousia tryonii is the first nickel hyperaccumulating plant species discovered in Queensland.

== Distribution & Habitat ==
This species has a restricted range where the species range mainly extends from Yaamba to Glen Geddes in the north near Lake Learmouth State Forest in regional Rockhampton, Queensland. It also occurs in the Livingstone Shire from Keppel Sands Road to Bondoola where the Yeppoon-Rockhampton Road highway intersects its habitat. Smaller occurrences of this species occur in pockets of ultramafic serpentine soil past Glen Geddes to Eugene State Forest and Marlborough, Queensland. Other native flora seen in association with this species include Themeda triandra, Hibiscus heterophyllus, Eucalyptus fibrosa, Eucalyptus xanthope, Acacia aulacocarpa, Pimelea leptospermoides, and Styphelia cuspidata. Invasive weeds including Lantana camara and Stachytarpheta jamaicensis can be tolerant to serpentine and may appear in the same habitat through disturbance.

== Conservation status ==
Stackhousia tryonii is listed as "near threatened" under the Queensland Nature Conservation Act 1992. It is not listed under the Australian Government Environment Protection and Biodiversity Conservation Act 1999.
