= Kunwarara, Queensland =

Kunwarara
- Suburb
- Interactive map of Kunwarara
- Coordinates: 22.8516°S 150.1091°E
- Country: Australia
- State: Queensland
- LGA: Livingstone Shire
- Location: 27.5 km (17.1 mi) NW of Milman; 54.4 km (33.8 mi) NW of Kawana; 58.8 km (36.5 mi) NW of Rockhampton; 677 km (421 mi) NNW of Brisbane

Government
  - State electorate: Mirani
  - Federal division: Capricornia

Area
  - Total: 673.4 km^{2} (260.0 sq mi)

Population
  - Total: 69 (2021 census)
  - Density: 0.1025/km^{2} (0.2654/sq mi)
- Time zone: UTC+10:00 (AEST)
- Postcode: 4702
Suburbs around Kunwarara
Marlborough	Stanage	Shoalwater
Marlborough	Kunwarara	Shoalwater
Marlborough	Canoona	Canal Creek

Kunwarara is a rural locality in the Livingstone Shire, Queensland, Australia. In the 2021 census, Kunwarara had a population of 69 people.

== Geography ==
The North Coast railway line forms part of the southern boundary of the locality with Canoona and then passes through the south-west of locality exiting to Marlborough.

Merimal is a neighbourhood within the locality (22.95°S 150.2°E). It takes its name from the now-abandoned Merimal railway station (22.9535°S 150.1996°E) on the North Coast railway line. Merimal Park (pastoral property) takes its name from the abandoned railway station and locality.

Princhester is an abandoned town in the locality (22.9436°S 150.0116°E). It takes its name from the former pastoral run established in 1857 by Dan Connor. Princhester railway siding (22.8592°S 150.0119°E) is to the north of the town on the North Coast railway line.

Despite its name Kunwarara railway station (22.9153°S 150.1361°E) is now located within the boundaries of Canoona to the south.

The Magog Range is in the north-west of the locality (22.7524°S 149.9541°E) extending into neighbouring Marlborough. It includes a number of peaks within the locality (from north to south):

- Mount Og (22.7441°S 149.9738°E) at 317 metres (1,040 ft) above sea level
- Mount Gog (22.7508°S 149.9991°E) at 320 metres (1,050 ft) above sea level
- Mount O'Connell (22.7511°S 150.0363°E) at 480 metres (1,570 ft) above sea level, thought to be named after Sir Maurice Charles O'Connell, President of the Legislative Council of Queensland
- Mount Moriah (22.7830°S 150.0061°E) at 324 metres (1,063 ft) above sea level
- Mount Pisgah (22.8116°S 150.0027°E) at 293 metres (961 ft) above sea level

The Pointer Range (22.9978°S 150.2805°E) forms part of south-eastern boundary of Kunwarara separating it from Canal Creek. The range extends south into Canoona.

== History ==
The Princhester pastoral run was established in 1857 by Dan Connor. By 1860 a Native Police barracks was constructed at Princhester under Sub-Lieutenant Walter Powell. The first town lots in Princhester were sold in June 1862. There was a gold rush at Princhester in 1883. However, it did not produce very much gold. From time to time, further small finds were made prompting more "rushes", but it was not a great gold producing area particularly compared with the success of Mount Morgan.

The section of the North Coast railway lines from Yaamba to Kunwarara was opened in August 1915. The next section of the North Coast railway line from Kunwarara to Marlborough was officially opened on Saturday 31 March 1917 by Herbert Hardacre, the Queensland Minister for Public Instruction. Although Kunwarara railway station remains officially an operational station, in 1994 the station building was relocated to the Australian Workers Heritage Centre in Barcaldine.

== Demographics ==
In the 2016 census, Kunwarara had a population of 71 people.

In the 2021 census, Kunwarara had a population of 69 people.

== Economy ==
There are a number of homesteads in the locality:

- Balmoral (22.9824°S 150.2620°E)
- Eden Garry (22.8470°S 150.0615°E)
- Grosvenor Park (22.9057°S 150.2163°E)
- Merimal Park

== Education ==
There are no schools in Kunwarara. The nearest government primary schools are Marlborough State School in neighbouring Marlborough to the west and Milman State School in Milman to the south-east. The nearest government secondary school is Glenmore State High School in Kawana in Rockhampton to the south.
