= Canal Creek =

- Suburb
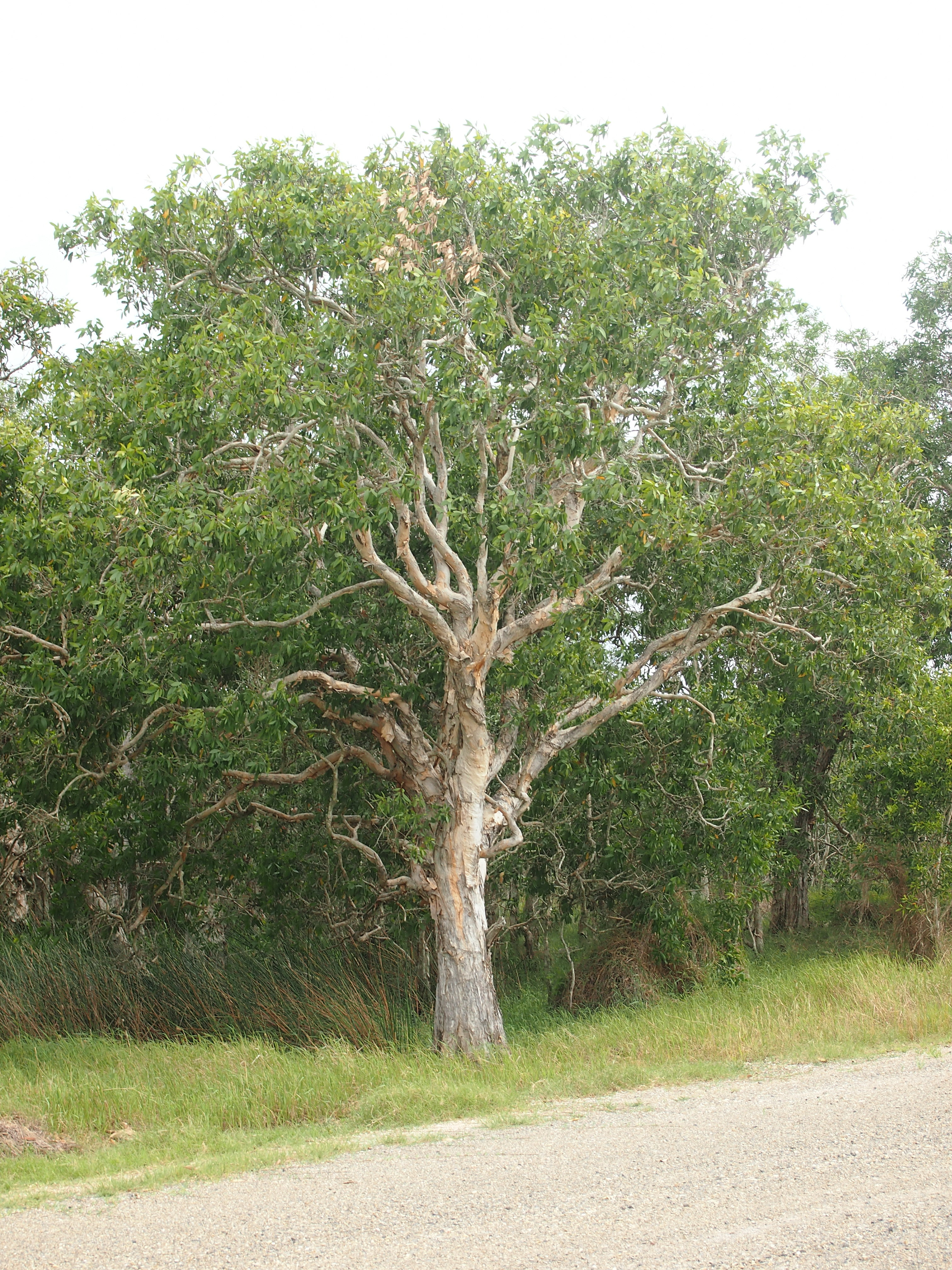
- Melaleuca viridiflora in Canal Creek

- Interactive map of Canal Creek
- Coordinates: 22.945°S 150.3952°E
- Country: Australia
- State: Queensland
- LGA: Livingstone Shire
- Location: 49.3 km (30.6 mi) NNW of Kawana; 53.4 km (33.2 mi) NNW of Yeppoon; 54.2 km (33.7 mi) NNW of Rockhampton CBD; 698 km (434 mi) NNW of Brisbane

Government
  - State electorates: Mirani; Keppel
  - Federal division: Capricornia

Area
  - Total: 537.3 km^{2} (207.5 sq mi)

Population
  - Total: 0 (2021 census)
  - Density: 0.0000/km^{2} (0.0000/sq mi)
- Time zone: UTC+10:00 (AEST)
- Postcode: 4702
Suburbs around Canal Creek
| Kunwarara | Shoalwater | Byfield |
| Kunwarara | Canal Creek | Maryvale |
| Canoona | Jardine; Rossmoya | Greenlake |

Canal Creek is a rural locality in the Livingstone Shire, Queensland, Australia. In the 2021 census, Canal Creek had "no people or a very low population".

== Geography ==
The ridge of the Pointer Range forms the south-western boundary of the locality. The terrain in the locality ranges from flatter land at approx 20 metres (66 ft) above sea level to numerous named peaks including (from west to east):

- North Pointer 223 metres (732 ft)
- The Pointer 167 metres (548 ft)
- Mount Jardine 98 metres (322 ft)
- Pleasant Hill 46 metres (151 ft)
- Conical Mountain 200 metres (660 ft)
- Charley Peak 260 metres (850 ft)
- The Gate Mountain 112 metres (367 ft)

Three creeks enter through the locality from the north (Shoalwater) flowing south, Alligator Creek to Canoona/Jardine and Canal Creek (from which the locality presumably takes its name) and Werribee Creek to Rossmoya. These creeks are ultimately tributaries to the Fitzroy River which enters the Coral Sea between Thompsons Point and Port Alma.

There are a number of protected areas in the locality, including:

- North Pointer Conservation Park in the south-west of the locality
- Alligator Creek State Forest in the north and centre of the locality
- Canal Creek State Forest in the centre of the locality
- Werribee State Forest in the north-east of the locality

The predominant land use is grazing on native vegetation, plantation forestry and a small amount of crop growing.

== History ==
On 19 December 1943 a USA military aircraft crashed at Canal Creek Cattle Station and 31 people were killed. The C47 aircraft of 22nd Troop Carrier Squadron 374th Transport Group was flying from Townsville to Brisbane with a stop in Rockhampton. The port engine caught fire, which caused an explosion and the plane crashed and all 31 people on board were killed. The aircraft was carrying 20 USA military personnel, 8 Australian military personnel, and three civilians (one from the YMCA, one from the Salvation Army, and a war photographer). On 16 June 2002 a memorial to the crash was officially dedicated; it is at 22.97974°S 150.48141°E approximately 1 kilometre (0.62 mi) from the crash site due to the boggy terrain at the site. The memorial was organised by Yeppoon resident John Millroy. It was the 2nd worst aircrash in Australia's history (Bakers Creek air crash in June 1943 killed 40 people).

== Demographics ==
In the 2016 census, Canal Creek had a population of 8 people.

In the 2021 census, Canal Creek had "no people or a very low population".

== Education ==
There are no schools in Canal Creek. The nearest government primary school is Milman State School in Millman to the south. The nearest government secondary schools are Yeppoon State High School in Yeppoon to the south-east and Glenmore State High School in Kawana, Rockhampton to the south. The north-western parts of Canal Creek are too distant from these secondary schools for a daily commute, so distance education and boarding school are other alternatives.
