= Styphelia cognata =

Scientific classification
- Kingdom: Plantae
- Clade: Tracheophytes
- Clade: Angiosperms
- Clade: Eudicots
- Clade: Asterids
- Order: Ericales
- Family: Ericaceae
- Genus: Styphelia
- Species: S. cognata

Binomial name
- Styphelia cognata A.R.Bean

Species of shrub

Styphelia cognata is a species of flowering plant in the heath family Ericaceae and is endemic to a small area in north Queensland. It is a shrub with densely hairy branches, egg-shaped to lance-shaped leaves with the narrower end towards the base, and small white flowers.

== Description ==
Styphelia cognata is a shrub with densely hairy branchlets, that typically grows to a height of 0.3–1.5 m (1 ft 0 in – 4 ft 11 in). Its leaves are egg-shaped to lance-shaped with the narrower end towards the base, 5.4–9 mm (0.21–0.35 in) long and 1.5–2.1 mm (0.059–0.083 in) wide on an indistinct petiole. The leaves are concave, and more or less glabrous, the upper surface shiny and the lower surface dull green. The flowers are mostly arranged singly in leaf axils on a peduncle 1.0–1.5 mm (0.039–0.059 in) long, with bracts and boat-shaped bracteoles 2.2–2.5 mm (0.087–0.098 in) long. The sepals are 2.8–3.4 mm (0.11–0.13 in) long and the petals are white, forming a tube 2.2–2.9 mm (0.087–0.114 in) long with lobes 1.8–2.7 mm (0.071–0.106 in) long and densely hairy on the inside. Flowering occurs in all months and the fruit is an elliptic drupe 2.5–2.9 mm (0.098–0.114 in) long.

== Taxonomy ==
Stypheli cognata was first formally described in 2020 by Anthony Bean in the journal Austrobaileya from specimens collected in the Port Curtis district in 1998. The specific epithet (cognata) means "closely related", in reference to it similarity to Styphelia cuspidata.

== Distribution and habitat ==
Styphelia cognata is found in a limited area between Marlborough and The Caves where it grows in woodland on hilly terrain.
