= Barmoya, Queensland =

Barmoya
- Suburb
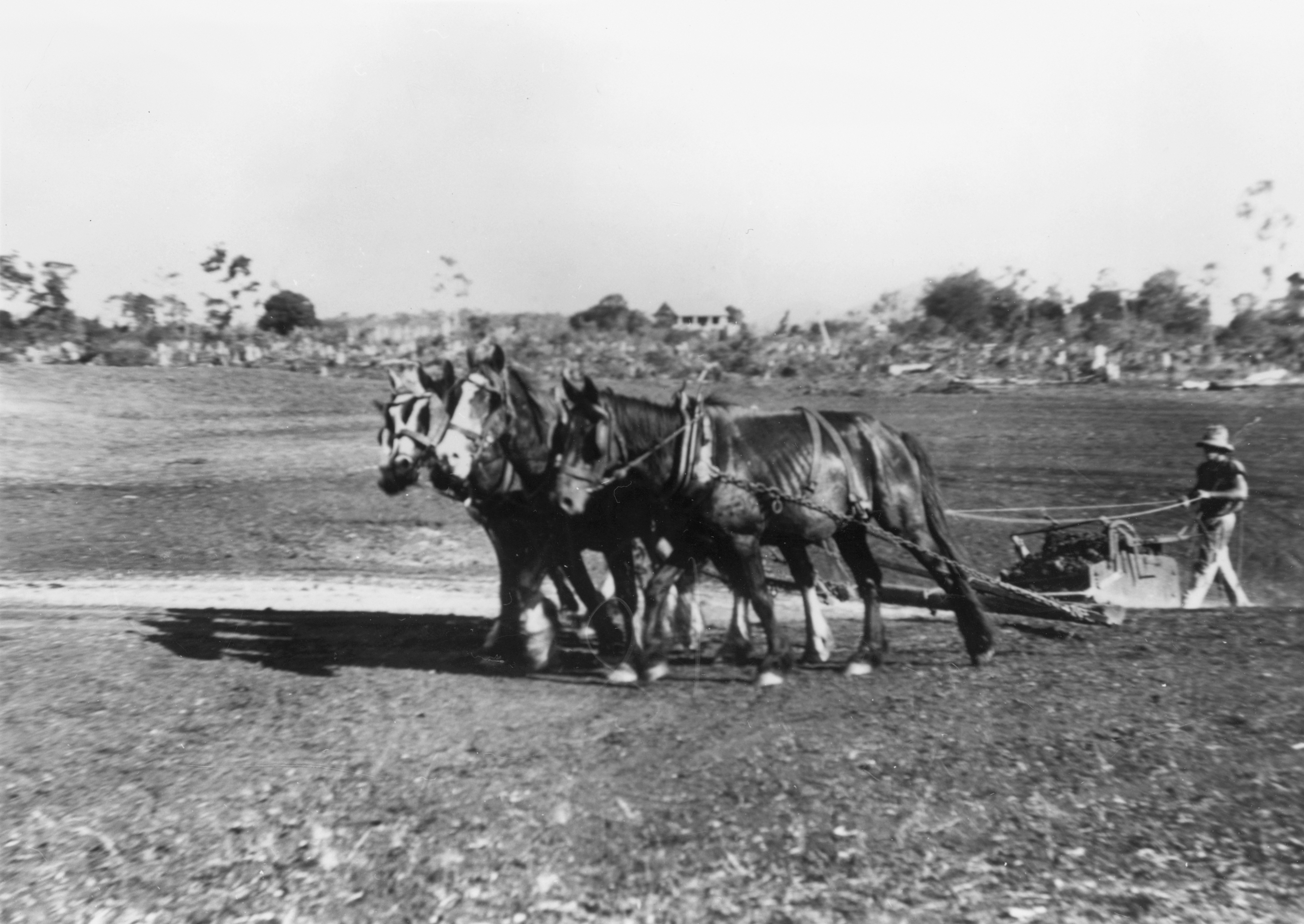
- Team of horses used in the dam building on Redlands, Arthur Jones' property, Barmoya, 1920s

- Interactive map of Barmoya
- Coordinates: 23.1277°S 150.5397°E
- Country: Australia
- State: Queensland
- LGA: Livingstone Shire
- Location: 31.9 km (19.8 mi) NNE of Rockhampton CBD; 35.3 km (21.9 mi) W of Yeppoon; 671 km (417 mi) NNW of Brisbane

Government
  - State electorate: Keppel
  - Federal division: Capricornia

Area
  - Total: 77.2 km^{2} (29.8 sq mi)

Population
  - Total: 85 (2021 census)
  - Density: 1.101/km^{2} (2.852/sq mi)
- Time zone: UTC+10:00 (AEST)
- Postcode: 4703
Suburbs around Barmoya
Rossmoya	Greenlake	Greenlake
Wattlebank	Barmoya	Lake Mary
The Caves	Sandringham	Cobraball; Mulara

Barmoya is a rural locality in the Livingstone Shire, Queensland, Australia. In the 2021 census, Barmoya had a population of 85 people.

== Geography ==
Hedlow Creek forms the eastern boundary of the locality.

Mount Munga Wappa rises to 155 metres (509 ft) above sea level in the centre of the locality (23.1145°S 150.5405°E).

The centre and north-east of the locality have swampland. The land use in the locality is predominantly grazing on native vegetation.

== History ==
Barmoya Settlement State School opened on 31 August 1911. In 1935, it was renamed Barmoya East State School. It closed on 4 July 1969. It was at 9 C H Barretts Road (corner of East Barmoya Road, 23.14461°S 150.54377°E).

Barmoya Central State School opened on 28 August 1918. In February 1930, the school was closed because it had only seven students; it was suggested that the school should be moved to a more central location. In October 1931, it was proposed to relocate the school building to Rossmoya Road where 16 students could attend the school, but some parents thought it was too distant for their children to travel to and from the school each day. In June 1932, it was decided to move the school to Rossmoya Road, but, in March 1933, the government said there were insufficient funds available to move the school at that time. In September 1933, tenders were called to relocate the school. The school was relocated in January 1934. In 1936, it was renamed Wattlebank State School. It closed in December 1959. It was on the western side of Rossmoya Road (approx 23.13030°S 150.45931°E) in Wattlebank.

The locality was officially named and bounded on 18 February 2000.

== Demographics ==
In the 2016 census, Barmoya had a population of 80 people.

In the 2021 census, Barmoya had a population of 85 people.

== Education ==
There are no schools are in Barmoya. The nearest government primary schools are The Caves State School in neighbouring The Caves to the south-west, Milman State School in Milman to the west, and Yeppoon State School in Yeppoon to the east. The nearest government secondary schools are Yeppoon State High School in Yeppoon and Glenmore State High School in Kawana, Rockhampton, to the south.
