= Pimelea leptospermoides =

Conservation status
- Vulnerable (EPBC Act)

Scientific classification
- Kingdom: Plantae
- Clade: Tracheophytes
- Clade: Angiosperms
- Clade: Eudicots
- Clade: Rosids
- Order: Malvales
- Family: Thymelaeaceae
- Genus: Pimelea
- Species: P. leptospermoides

Binomial name
- Pimelea leptospermoides F.Muell.

Synonyms
- Banksia leptospermoides (F.Muell.) Kuntze

Species of shrub

Pimelea leptospermoides, commonly known as serpentine rice flower, is a species of flowering plant in the family Thymelaeaceae and is endemic to Queensland. It is a shrub with narrowly egg-shaped to elliptic leaves and white, tube-shaped flowers arranged in groups of up to 7.

== Description ==
Pimelea leptospermoides is a shrub that typically grows to a height of 0.3–1 m (1 ft 0 in – 3 ft 3 in) and has hairy young stems. The leaves are narrowly egg-shaped with the narrower end towards the base, to elliptic, 7–22 mm (0.28–0.87 in) long and 2–7 mm (0.079–0.276 in) wide on a petiole 0.7–1 mm (0.028–0.039 in) long. The flowers are arranged singly or in small groups in leaf axils on a densely hairy rachis 1–2 mm (0.039–0.079 in) long. The flowers are white, the floral tube 6–10 mm (0.24–0.39 in) long, the sepals 2–4 mm (0.079–0.157 in) long, the style shorter than the floral tube. Flowering occurs from May to October.

== Taxonomy ==
Pimelea leptospermoides was first formally described in 1869 by Ferdinand von Mueller in Fragmenta Phytographiae Australiae from specimens collected near the Tropic of Capricorn by Anthelme Thozet.

In 2017, Anthony Bean described two subspecies of P. leptospermoides and the names are accepted by the Australian Plant Census:

- Pimelea leptospermoides subsp. bowmanii (F.Muell. ex Benth.) A.R.Bean, (previously known as Pimelea bowmanni F.Muell. ex Benth.) has densely hairy lower leaf surfaces, the hairs 0.8–0.9 mm (0.031–0.035 in) long, and the hairs on the floral tube 0.4–0.6 mm (0.016–0.024 in) long.
- Pimelea leptospermoides F.Muell.) subsp. leptospermoides has sparsely hairy lower leaf surfaces, the hairs 0.25–0.6 mm (0.0098–0.0236 in) long, and the hairs on the floral tube 0.2–0.3 mm (0.0079–0.0118 in) long.

== Distribution and habitat ==
This pimelea grows on stony hillsides and in the understory of shrubby woodland in serpentine soils, from near Marlborough to near Rockhampton in north Queensland. Eucalyptus fibrosa subsp. fibrosa and Corymbia xanthope are indicators of serpentine soils, and commonly co-occur with Pimelea leptospermoides, which actively accumulates large amounts of nickel. Subspecies bowmanni is found west of Canoona, and subsp. leptospermoides occurs between Canoona and Marlborough.

== Conservation status ==
Pimelea leptospermoides is listed as "vulnerable" under the Australian Government Environment Protection and Biodiversity Conservation Act 1999 and as "near threatened" under the Queensland Government Nature Conservation Act 1992.. Pimelea leptospermoides subsp. bowmanni is listed as "critically endangered under the Queensland Nature Conservation Act 1992, and Pimelea leptospermoides subsp. leptospermoides is listed as "vulnerable" under the same act.

This species has the potential to become at risk of localized extinction due the species restricted distribution. Threats to this species include vegetation clearing, altered fire regimes, mining, and inappropriate timber harvesting. Broadscale vegetation clearing on serpentine soil occurs mainly through mining and agricultural pasture improvement..
