= Kawana, Queensland =

Kawana, Queensland may refer to either of two locations in the Australian state of Queensland:

- Kawana Waters, Queensland, an urban centre on the Sunshine Coast
- Kawana, Queensland (Rockhampton), a suburb of the regional city Rockhampton
