= Jardine, Queensland =

Jardine
- Suburb
- Interactive map of Jardine
- Coordinates: 23.0569°S 150.4019°E
- Country: Australia
- State: Queensland
- LGA: Livingstone Shire
- Location: 37.2 km (23.1 mi) N of Kawana; 43.0 km (26.7 mi) N of Rockhampton; 57.9 km (36.0 mi) WNW of Yeppoon; 661 km (411 mi) NNW of Brisbane

Government
  - State electorate: Mirani
  - Federal division: Capricornia

Area
  - Total: 61.4 km^{2} (23.7 sq mi)
- Elevation: 20–30 m (66–98 ft)

Population
  - Total: 72 (2021 census)
  - Density: 1.173/km^{2} (3.037/sq mi)
- Time zone: UTC+10:00 (AEST)
- Postcode: 4702
Suburbs around Jardine
Canoona	Canal Creek	Canal Creek
Canoona	Jardine	Rossmoya
Yaamba	Yaamba	Milman

Jardine is a rural locality in the Livingstone Shire, Queensland, Australia. In the 2021 census, Jardine had a population of 72 people.

== Geography ==
The locality is bounded by Alligator Creek to the west, by Bills Creek to the north and Hedlow Creek.

The land is relatively flat mostly 20–30 metres (66–98 ft) above sea level. The predominant land use is grazing on native vegetation with some cropping.

== History ==
The locality was most likely named after pastoralist and magistrate John Jardine of Rockhampton.

Jardine Provisional School opened on 11 August 1913. On 1 December 1914, it became Jardine State School. Circa 1935, it was renamed Milman State School.

== Demographics ==
In the 2016 census, Jardine had a population of 59 people.

In the 2021 census, Jardine had a population of 72 people.

== Education ==
There are no schools in present-day Jardine. The nearest government primary school is Milman State School in neighbouring Milman to the south-east. The nearest government secondary school is Glenmore State High School in Kawana, a northern suburb of Rockhampton, to the south.
