= Wattlebank =

- Suburb
- Interactive map of Wattlebank
- Coordinates: 23.1202°S 150.4725°E
- Country: Australia
- State: Queensland
- LGA: Livingstone Shire
- Location: 30.4 km (18.9 mi) N of Rockhampton CBD; 44.1 km (27.4 mi) W of Yeppoon; 675 km (419 mi) NNW of Brisbane

Government
  - State electorates: Keppel; Mirani
  - Federal division: Capricornia

Area
  - Total: 31.1 km^{2} (12.0 sq mi)

Population
  - Total: 74 (2021 census)
  - Density: 2.379/km^{2} (6.16/sq mi)
- Time zone: UTC+10:00 (AEST)
- Postcode: 4704
Suburbs around Wattlebank
Milman	Rossmoya	Rossmoya
Milman	Wattlebank	Barmoya
The Caves	The Caves	Barmoya

Wattlebank is a rural locality in the Livingstone Shire, Queensland, Australia. In the 2021 census, Wattlebank had a population of 74 people.

== Geography ==
The terrain varies from 20 to 150 metres (66 to 492 ft) above sea level. The land use is grazing on native vegetation.

== History ==
Barmoya Central State School opened on 28 August 1918. In February 1930, the school was closed because it had only seven students; it was suggested that the school should be moved to a more central location. In October 1931, it was proposed to relocate the school building to Rossmoya Road where 16 students could attend the school, but some parents thought it was too distant for their children to travel to and from the school each day. In June 1932, it was decided to move the school to Rossmoya Road, but, in March 1933, the government said there were insufficient funds available to move the school at that time. In September 1933, tenders were called to relocate the school. The school was relocated in January 1934. In 1936, it was renamed Wattlebank State School. It closed in December 1959. It was on the western side of Rossmoya Road (approx 23.13030°S 150.45931°E).

== Demographics ==
In the 2016 census, Wattlebank had a population of 78 people.

In the 2021 census, Wattlebank had a population of 74 people.

== Education ==
There are no schools in Wattlebank. The nearest government primary schools are Milman State School in neighbouring Milman to the west and The Caves State School in neighbouring The Caves to the south. The nearest government secondary school is Glenmore State High School in Kawana, Rockhampton, to the south.
