= Rossmoya =

- Suburb
- Interactive map of Rossmoya
- Coordinates: 23.05°S 150.4916°E
- Country: Australia
- State: Queensland
- LGA: Livingstone Shire
- Location: 18.5 km (11.5 mi) NE of Milman; 44.1 km (27.4 mi) N of Rockhampton CBD; 57.9 km (36.0 mi) WNW of Yeppoon; 674 km (419 mi) NNW of Brisbane

Government
  - State electorates: Keppel; Mirani
  - Federal division: Capricornia

Area
  - Total: 62.2 km^{2} (24.0 sq mi)

Population
  - Total: 67 (2021 census)
  - Density: 1.077/km^{2} (2.790/sq mi)
- Time zone: UTC+10:00 (AEST)
- Postcode: 4702
Suburbs around Rossmoya
Canal Creek	Canal Creek	Greenlake
Jardine	Rossmoya	Greenlake
Milman	Wattlebank	Barmoya

Rossmoya is a rural locality in the Livingstone Shire, Queensland, Australia. In the 2021 census, Rossmoya had a population of 67 people.

== History ==
Rossmoya Provisional School opened on 30 July 1923. It became Rossmoya State School circa 1926. It closed on 26 January 1968. It was at 1770 Rossmoya Road (23.02557°S 150.48425°E).

== Demographics ==
In the 2016 census, Rossmoya had a population of 65 people.

In the 2021 census, Rossmoya had a population of 67 people.

== Education ==
There are no schools in Rossmoya. The nearest government primary school is Milman State School in neighbouring Milman to the south-west. The nearest government secondary schools are Yeppoon State High School in Yeppoon to the east and Glenmore State High School in Kawana, Rockhampton, to the south.
