= The Caves, Queensland =

The Caves
- Town
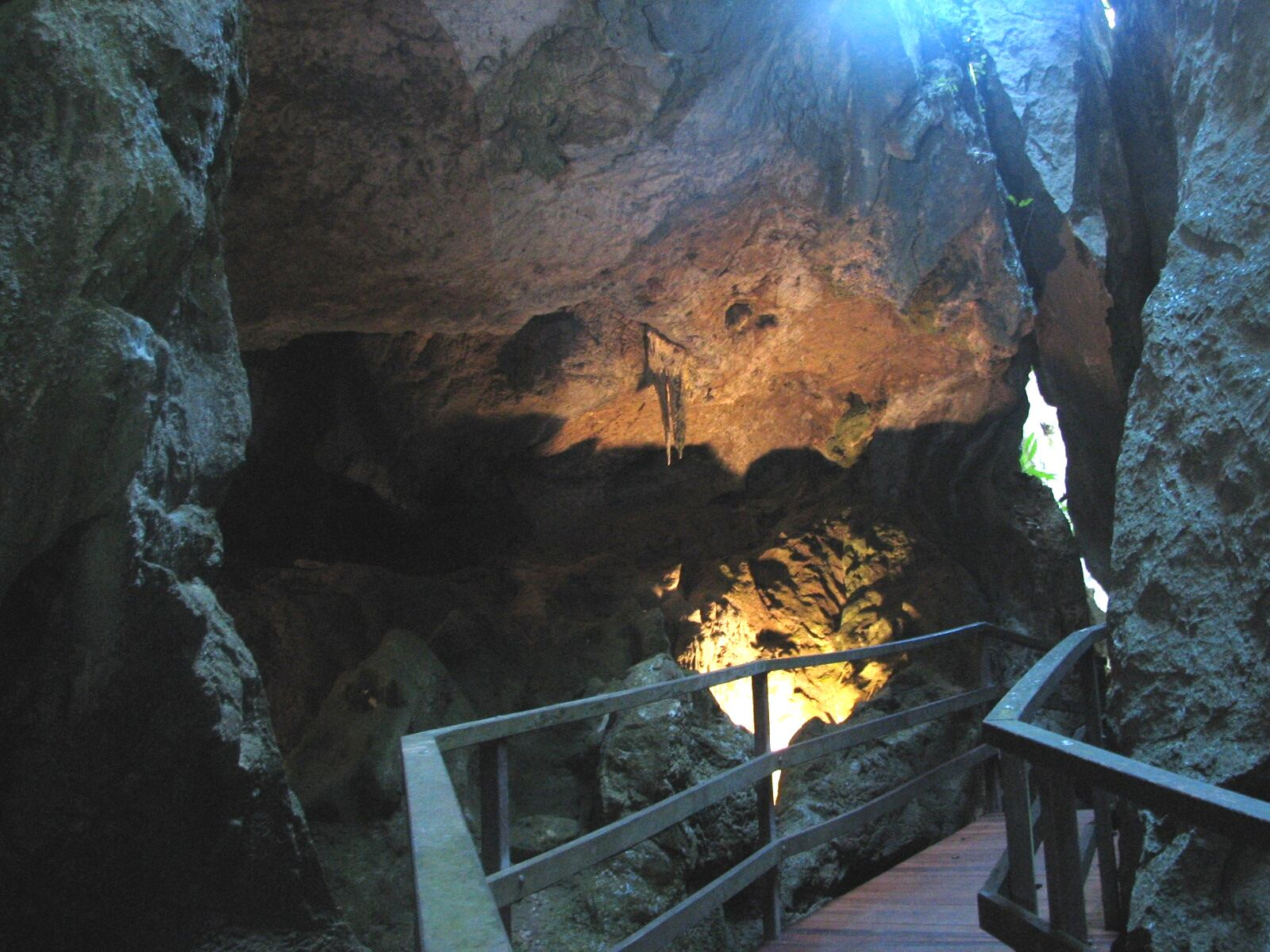
- Capricornia Caves

- Interactive map of The Caves
- Coordinates: 23.1766°S 150.4597°E
- Country: Australia
- State: Queensland
- LGA: Shire of Livingstone
- Location: 25.8 km (16.0 mi) N of Rockhampton; 43.3 km (26.9 mi) W of Yeppoon; 640 km (400 mi) NNW of Brisbane

Government
  - State electorates: Keppel; Mirani
  - Federal division: Capricornia

Area
  - Total: 45.0 km^{2} (17.4 sq mi)

Population
  - Total: 680 (2021 census)
  - Density: 15.11/km^{2} (39.1/sq mi)
- Time zone: UTC+10:00 (AEST)
- Postcode: 4702
Localities around The Caves
Milman	Wattlebank	Barmoya
Yaamba	The Caves	Sandringham
Etna Creek	Etna Creek	Sandringham

The Caves is a rural town and locality in the Livingstone Shire, Queensland, Australia. In the 2021 census, the locality of The Caves had a population of 680 people.

== Geography ==
The locality is in Central Queensland region. Alligator Creek, a tributary of the Fitzroy River forms the western boundary of the locality. The town is in the centre of the locality.

Cammoo is a neighbourhood within the north of the locality (23.1666°S 150.45°E).

The Bruce Highway (locally also known as Yaamba Road) and the North Coast railway line traverse the locality from south (Etna Creek) to north-west (Milman), passing through the town, which is served by The Caves railway station (23.1807°S 150.4614°E) while Cammoo railway station further north in the locality (23.1669°S 150.4519°E) is now abandoned.

The Mount Etna Caves National Park (23.1575°S 150.4822°E) protects the limestone caves area in the north of the locality and its colonies of ghost bats:

- Cammoo Caves (23.1627°S 150.4662°E)
- Johansens Caves (23.1531°S 150.4610°E)
- Mount Etna Caves (23.1600°S 150.4551°E)

Olsens Caves in the east of the locality (23.1650°S 150.4905°E) is outside the national park.

The locality has a number of mountains, including:

- Limestone Peak (23.1592°S 150.4641°E) 204 metres (669 ft)
- Mount Charlton (23.1681°S 150.4375°E) 79 metres (259 ft)
- Mount Etna (23.1582°S 150.4524°E) 283 metres (928 ft)
- Scrubby Hill (23.1737°S 150.4361°E) 116 metres (381 ft)
- Spinifex Hill (23.1647°S 150.4586°E) 157 metres (515 ft)

== History ==
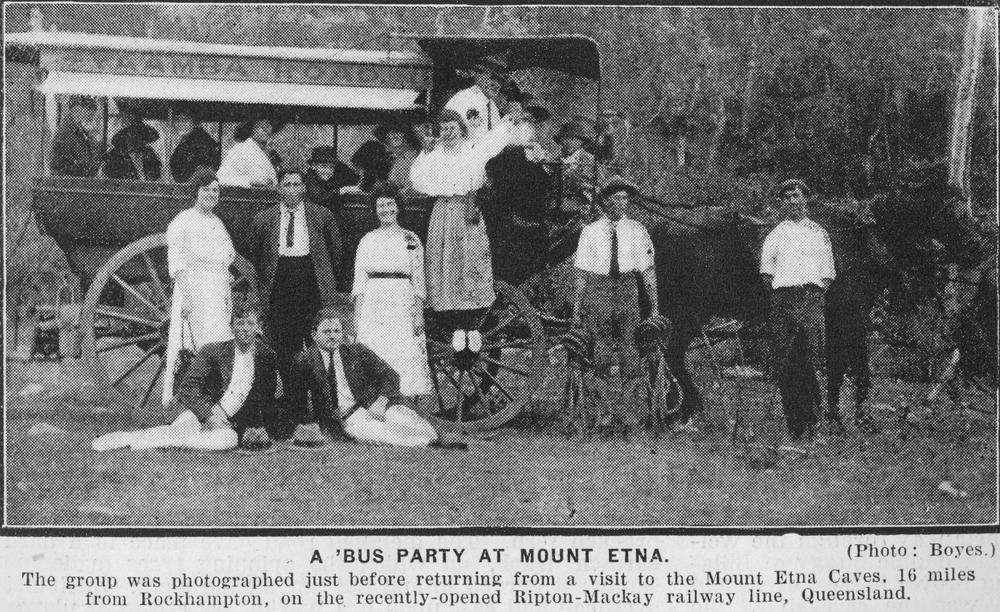
Group from Rockhampton, just before returning from a day trip to Mount Etna Caves, 1921

The town takes its name from The Caves railway station, which in turn was originally called Etna railway station but was renamed by the Queensland Railways Department on 23 July 1914, because of the limestone caves in the area.

Mount Etna Provisional School opened on 7 November 1904 but was renamed The Caves Provisional School in 1905. It became The Caves State School on 1 January 1909.

The Fitzroy Caves National Park was gazetted in 1973 with a focus on the protection of the bats rather than the caves. In 1990 it was renamed Mount Etna Caves National Park. In 1999 the park was extended to provide more protection to the caves.

The Caves Progress & Agricultural Society was established in 1975 to provide a venue to hold agricultural shows, campdrafts, rodeos, and other sporting events.

The Caves War Memorial was unveiled on Thursday 25 April 1985 (Anzac Day in Queensland) by Lindsay Hartwig, Member of the Queensland Legislative Assembly for Callide and chairman of the Livingstone Shire Council.

== Demographics ==
In the 2011 census, the locality of The Caves had a population of 708 people.

In the 2016 census, the locality of The Caves had a population of 718 people.

In the 2021 census, the locality of The Caves had a population of 680 people.

== Education ==
The Caves State School is a government primary (Prep-6) school for boys and girls at 1 Barmoya Road (23.1767°S 150.4593°E). In 2016, the school had an enrolment of 87 students with 6 teachers (5 full-time equivalent) and 8 non-teaching staff (5 full-time equivalent). In 2018, the school had an enrolment of 89 students with 5 teachers (4 full-time equivalent) and 10 non-teaching staff (5 full-time equivalent).

There is no secondary school in The Caves. The nearest government secondary school is Glenmore State High School in Kawana, Rockhampton, to the south.

== Amenities ==
North Rockhampton Uniting Church (based in Frenchville, Rockhampton) holds quarterly services at the CWA Hall.

The Caves Lions Bicentennial Park is at 5-11 Barmoya Street (23.1761°S 150.4599°E).

The Caves Showgrounds are on Rossmoya Road (23.1727°S 150.4583°E). The venue has an arena with supporting infrastructure such as kitchen, bar, pavilion, and announcer's box. It has powered and unpowered camp sites and toilet facilities. It also has paddocks, holding yards, and shutes to support the events involving animals.

The Caves War Memorial is in Buch Square off Rossmoya Road (23.1782°S 150.4603°E)

The Caves Post Office is at 7-9 Buch Square (23.1781°S 150.4606°E).

== Events ==
The Caves Show is an agricultural show held in April annually, but was cancelled in 2020 due to the COVID-19 pandemic.

The Caves Rodeo is held annually in September. It was also cancelled in 2020 due to the pandemic.

== Attractions ==
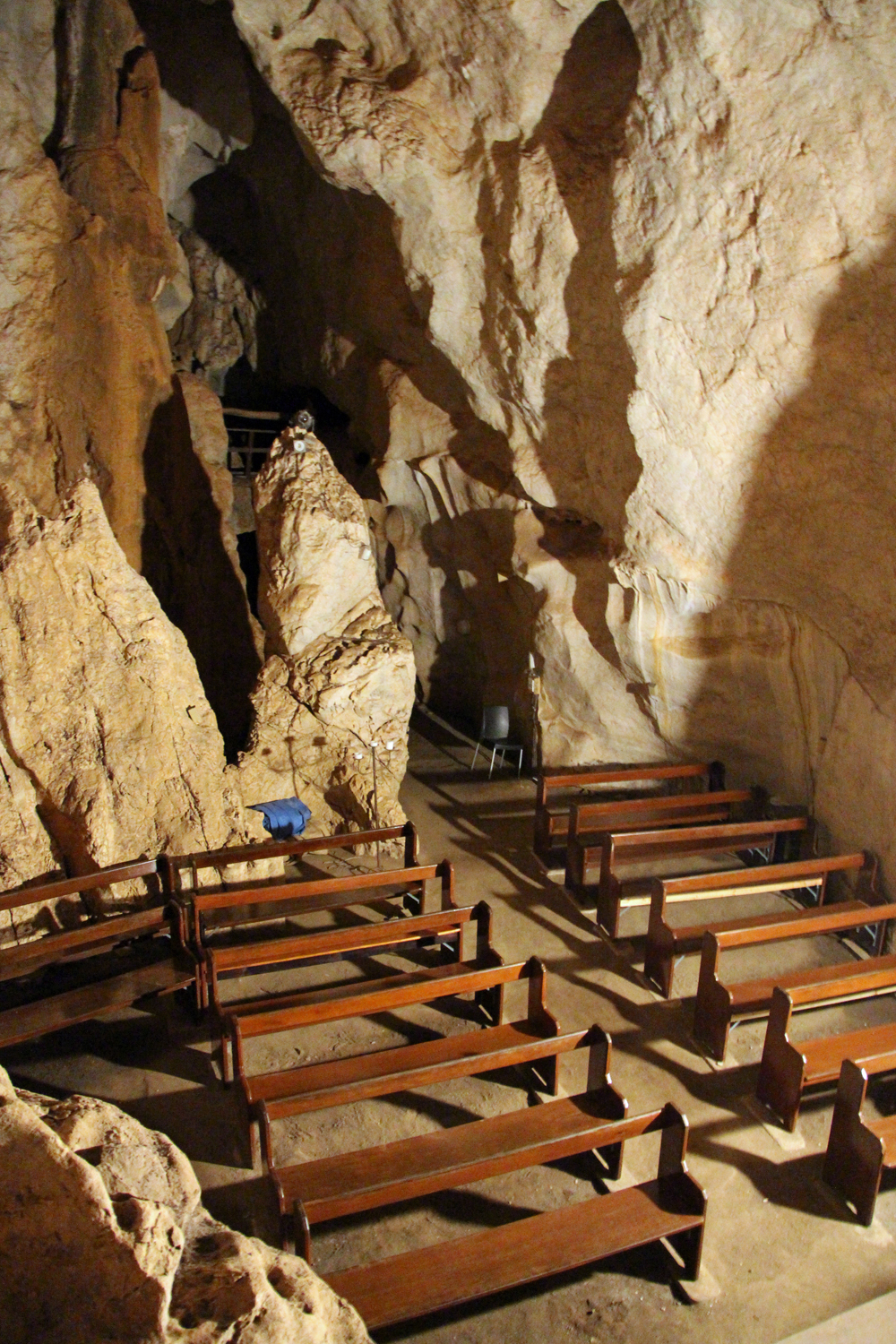
Cathedral Cave, Capricorn Caves, 2013

The Caves is home to two cave based tourist attractions. They are:

- Capricorn Caves, a privately owned limestone caves system.
- Mount Etna Caves National Park, a state government owned limestone caves system with two separate sections (Cammoo and Mount Etna)
