= Mount Etna Caves National Park =

National park in Australia

- IUCN category II (national park)
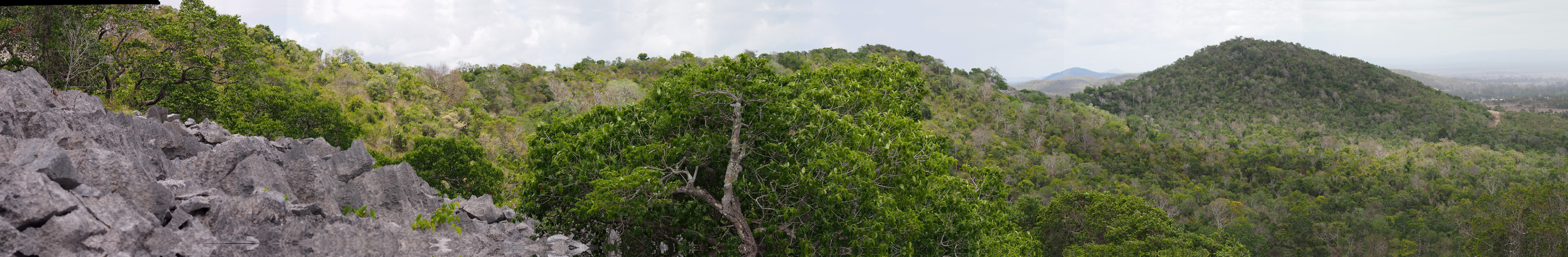
- View from eastern summit.

- Location within Queensland
- Location: Queensland
- Nearest city: The Caves
- Coordinates: 23°09′37″S 150°28′31″E
- Area: 4.78 km^{2} (1.85 sq mi)
- Established: 1994
- Governing body: Queensland Parks and Wildlife Service
- Website: Official website

Mount Etna Caves is a national park in The Caves, Shire of Livingstone, Queensland, Australia, 544 km northwest of Brisbane.

The park's caves are the roosting site for more than 80 percent of Australia's breeding population of little bent-wing bats. It is also one of the few places in Australia supporting a colony of the endangered ghost bat.

== History ==
The Fitzroy Caves National Park was gazetted in 1973 with a focus on the protection of the bats rather than the caves. In 1990, it was renamed Mount Etna Caves National Park. In 1999, the park was extended to provide more protection to the caves.

== Flora ==
The national park is home to rare and/or threatened species of native plant species:

- Corchorus hygrophilus
- Cycas ophiolitica
- Graphtophyllum excelsum
- Tectaria devexa

== Extinct Megafauna ==
Protemnodon, Sarcophilus, Thylacinus, and Thylacoleo fossils were found in the caves system and the surround Mount Etna area. Protemnodon fossils were found in the western side of the national park which was formerly a limestone mine.

== See also ==
- Protected areas of Queensland
