= Canoona =

- Suburb
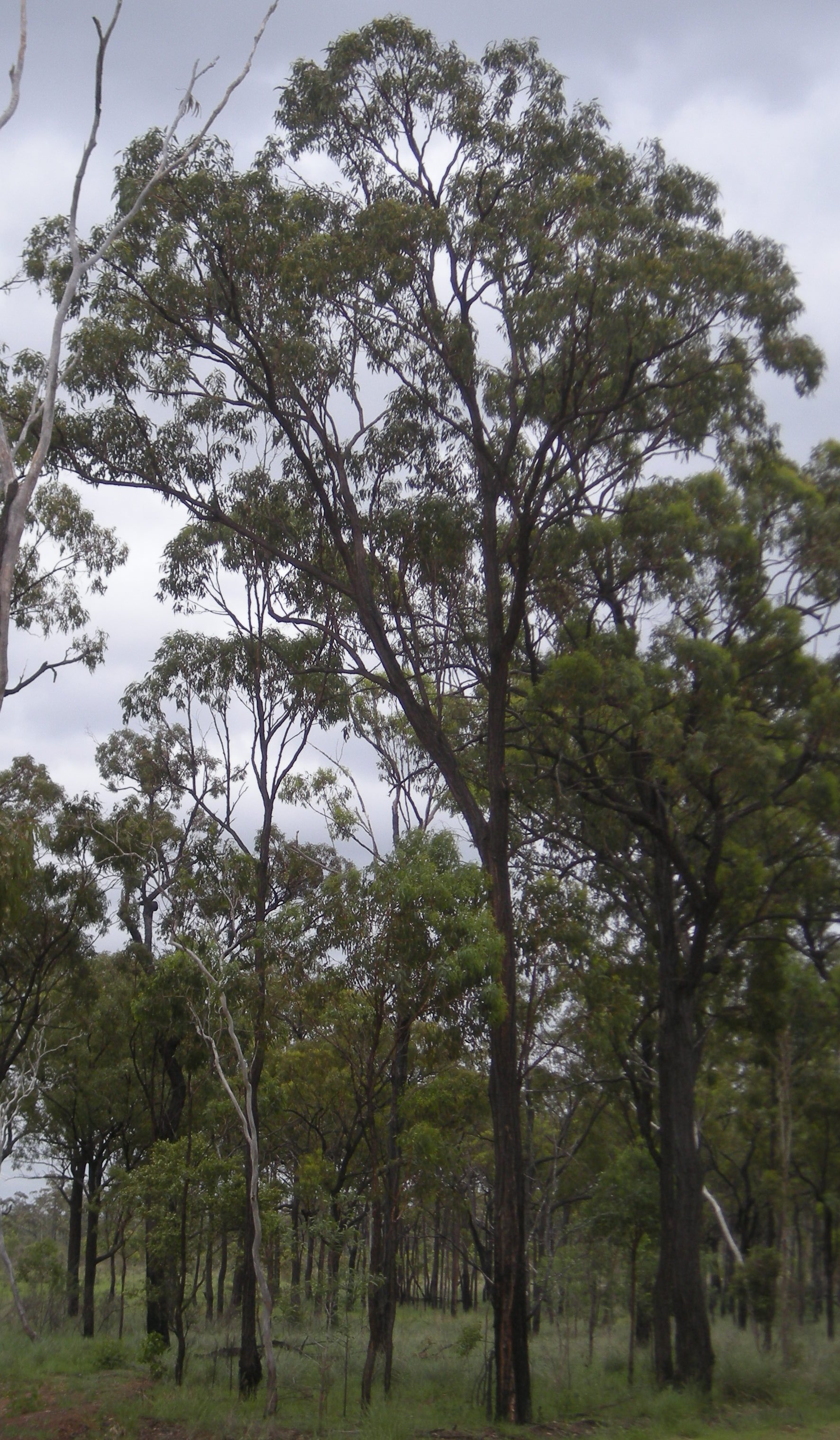
- Eucalyptus fibrosa tree, Canoona, 2011

- Interactive map of Canoona
- Coordinates: 23.015°S 150.1488°E
- Country: Australia
- State: Queensland
- LGA: Shire of Livingstone
- Location: 75.9 km (47.2 mi) WNW of Yeppoon; 58.5 km (36.4 mi) NW of Rockhampton; 703 km (437 mi) NNW of Brisbane

Government
  - State electorate: Mirani
  - Federal division: Capricornia

Area
  - Total: 612.6 km^{2} (236.5 sq mi)

Population
  - Total: 90 (2021 census)
  - Density: 0.147/km^{2} (0.381/sq mi)
- Time zone: UTC+10:00 (AEST)
- Postcode: 4702
Suburbs around Canoona
Marlborough	Kunwarara	Canal Creek
Glenroy	Canoona	Jardine
Morinish	Garnant	Yaamba

Canoona is a rural locality in the Livingstone Shire, Queensland, Australia. It was the site of the first North Australian gold rush. In the 2021 census, Canoona had a population of 90 people.

== Geography ==
The Fitzroy River forms the southern boundary of the locality, while Marlborough Creek and Mountain Hut Creek form most of its western boundary. The Bruce Highway forms most of the north-eastern boundary with North Coast railway line running closely beside it.

A number of creeks flow through the locality, all are tributaries of the Fitzroy River.

The Princhester Conservation Park lies in the west of the locality and the Lake Learmouth State Forest in the east. Apart from these protected areas, the land is predominantly used for grazing.

Although a town centre was surveyed for Canoona at 23.0328°S 150.1393°E, no township remains and the township land is now a reserved area.

There are a number of railway stations on the North Coast line within the locality; from north to south:

- Kunwarara railway station (22.9153°S 150.1361°E)
- Uromoko railway station, now abandoned (22.9313°S 150.1633°E)
- Merimal railway station, now abandoned (22.9535°S 150.1996°E)
- Canoona Loop railway station, now dismantled (23.0170°S 150.3143°E)
- Glen Geddes railway station (23.0253°S 150.2584°E)
- Canoona railway station, now abandoned (23.0761°S 150.2773°E)

Despite its name, Kunwarara railway station is located within the boundaries of present-day Canoona.

== History ==
=== British colonisation ===
Scottish colonists and brothers William Thomas Elliot and George Mackenzie Elliot came to the frontier Fitzroy River region in September 1855 to establish a sheep station, which they named Canoona. The brothers had previously established the Johngboon property near Barambah to the south. Their father was James Elliot, 3rd Laird of Wolfelee House near Hawick in Scotland. One of their other brothers was Walter Elliot of the East India Company and secretary to the governor of the Madras Presidency.

In January 1856, after a massacre of local Aboriginal people perpetrated by Lieutenant John Murray of the Native Police at nearby Nankin Creek, some 200 Aboriginal men, women and children came to Canoona and began shouting at the employees of the Elliots. William Thomas Elliot and his men opened fire at random upon the group which fled after a short time. Two of the white men were wounded and about seven of the local inhabitants were killed. Fellow colonist, Charles Archer of Gracemere and a group of Native Police troopers later pursued these Aboriginal people toward the east and punished them further. Local Aboriginal people friendly to Archer were also fired upon, killing one. George Mackenzie Elliot died of illness soon after, while William Thomas Elliot remained in the region for some time, later dying in Munich in 1890.

=== Gold rush of 1858 ===
After the goldfields in New South Wales and Victoria had been mined to the extent where there were few opportunities for the independent miner possessed of only basic equipment, many miners were seeking a new opportunity. On hearing that gold had been found at Canoona in about July 1858, it stimulated a gold rush and approximately 20,000 miners descended on Canoona within the following months. However, relatively little gold was found at Canoona and there was great disappointment and Canoona became known as a "duffer". Having spent everything to come to Canoona, many miners were then destitute. Having lost so much of its labour force, the Victorian Government sent a ship to enable destitute miners to return to Victoria and repay their fare by working in Melbourne on their return. While many returned to the southern states, others remained in Queensland providing a labour force that enabled the development of the newly established colony of Queensland. Some remained and would try their luck in Queensland's later gold rushes. For example, Hugo William Du Rietz was enticed to Australia by the gold rushes in Ballarat and then came to the Canoona gold rush and then to the Gympie gold rush. Although never particularly successful as a miner, he was successful as an architect and builder and took an active civic role in Brisbane and Gympie.

The North Coast railway line through Canoona was opened in 1915.

Although Kunwarara railway station remains officially an operational station, in 1994 the station building was relocated to the Australian Workers Heritage Museum in Barcaldine.

== Demographics ==
In the 2016 census, Canoona had a population of 81 people.

In the 2021 census, Canoona had a population of 90 people.

== Education ==
There are no schools in Canoona. The nearest government primary schools are Milman State School in Milman to the south-east and Marlborough State School in neighbouring Marlborough to the north-west. The nearest government secondary school is Glenmore State High School in Kawana, Rockhampton; however, some parts of Canoona are too distant for a daily commute so the alternatives would be distance education and boarding school.

== Notable deaths ==
- Alwyn Torenbeek (1937-2015), a notable Australian drover, endurance- and bronc rider, was killed in an accident on a rural property at Canoona in 2015. It is believed that the accident occurred when Torenbeek inadvertently pressed the accelerator while attempting to move over to the passenger side of the vehicle he was in, causing it to collide into a post.
