= Yaamba =

- Town
- Interactive map of Yaamba
- Coordinates: 23.1411°S 150.3736°E
- Country: Australia
- State: Queensland
- LGA: Shire of Livingstone
- Location: 36.8 km (22.9 mi) NNW of Rockhampton; 58.6 km (36.4 mi) W of Yeppoon; 668 km (415 mi) NNW of Brisbane

Government
  - State electorate: Mirani
  - Federal division: Capricornia

Area
  - Total: 66.1 km^{2} (25.5 sq mi)

Population
  - Total: 51 (2021 census)
  - Density: 0.772/km^{2} (1.998/sq mi)
- Time zone: UTC+10:00 (AEST)
- Postcode: 4704
Localities around Yaamba
Canoona	Canoona	Jardine
Canoona	Yaamba	Milman
Garnant	South Yaamba	The Caves

Yaamba is a rural town and locality in the Livingstone Shire, Queensland, Australia. In the 2021 census, the locality of Yaamba had a population of 51 people.

== Geography ==
Yaamba is bounded by the Fitzroy River to the south and by its tributary Alligator Creek to the east. The town is in the south of the locality beside the river.

The Bruce Highway enters the locality from the east (Milman) where it is locally known as Yaamba Road. It passes to the immediate north of the town, after which it is locally known as Kunwarara Road, and exits to the west (Canoona).

The North Coast railway line also passes through the locality from east to west, roughly parallel and north of the highway. The town is served by Yaamba railway station (23.1319°S 150.3675°E).

The land is predominantly used for grazing. There are two clusters of housing in the town, one cluster is around the highway and railway station; the other is further south nearer the river.

== History ==
The Darumbal (Tarumbul, Tharoombool) language region includes the city of Rockhampton extending south towards Raglan Creek and north towards the Styx River and inland along the Broad Sound Ranges.

The area takes its name from the pastoral run taken up in the 1860s by Peter Fitzallan MacDonald. It is believed to be an Aboriginal word meaning main camping ground.

Town lots were sold in Yaamba in November 1860.

In July 1872, a Rockhampton architect John William Wilson found a large salt water crocodile known as Big Ben dying in Alligator Creek (it had been shot). Big Ben had originally inhabited the lower reaches of the Fitzroy River but had been frightened by the shipping in the river and had retreated to Alligator Creek. In October that year, Wilson displayed Big Ben and some other crocodiles in Rockhampton's Theatre Royal. Big Ben was 22 feet 3 1/2 inches (6.795 m) long and an analysis of his stomach revealed human bones; local Aboriginal people had long believed Big Ben had eaten people and held a corroborree to celebrate his death.

Yaamba State School opened in 1867. It closed on 12 April 1940. It was located on the north-western corner of Iris Street and Yaamba Siding Road (approx 23.1328°S 150.3670°E).

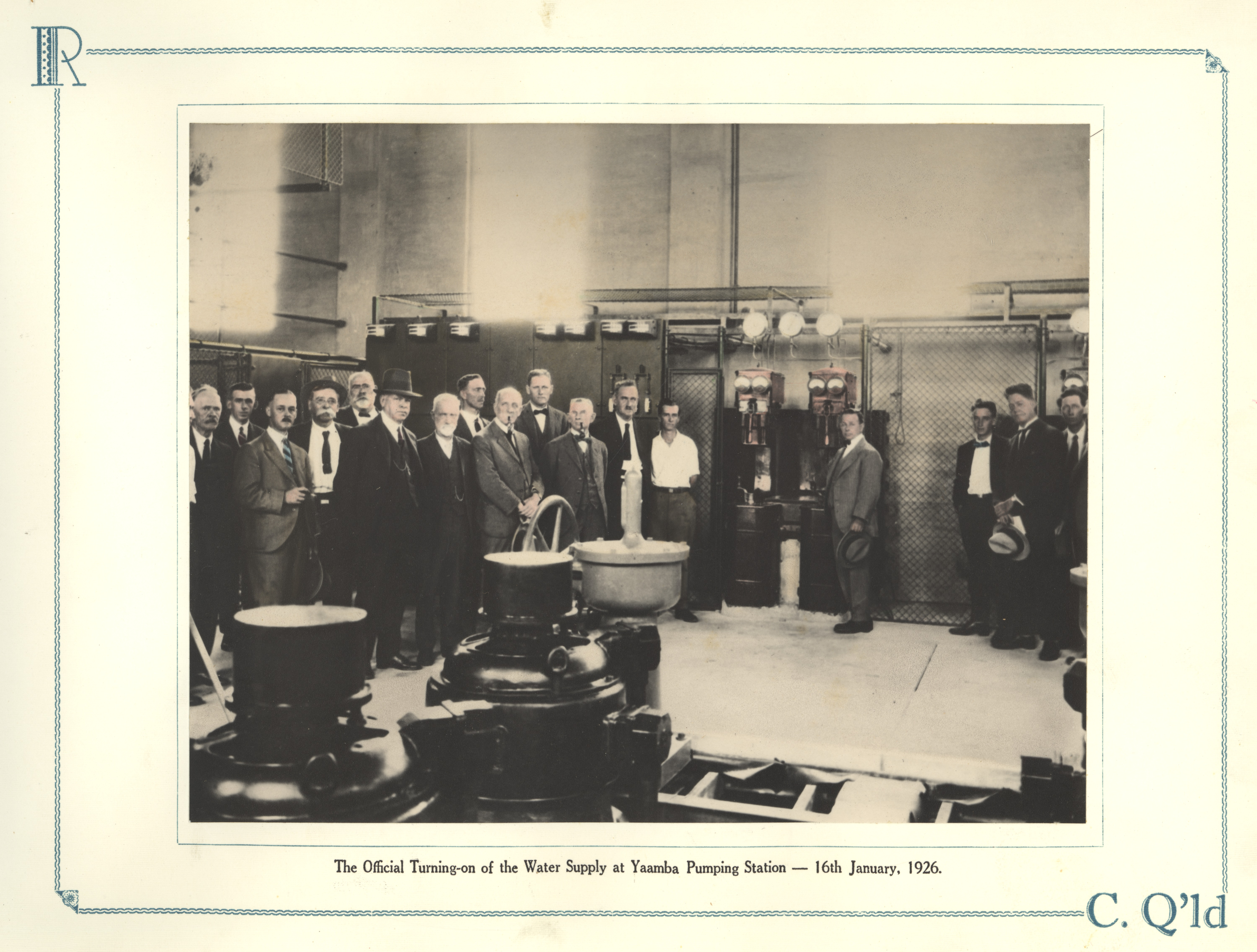
Official Turning-On ceremony at Yaamba pumping station, 16 January 1926

On Saturday 16 January 1926, the Yaamba pumping station was officially opened by the Mayor of Rockhampton Theodore William Kingel and Minister of Railways James Larcombe. The purpose of the pumping station was to supply the rapidly-growing City of Rockhampton with a reliable freshwater supply from the Fitzroy River, as the lower reaches of the Fitzoy River closer to Rockhampton were tidal and the water salty. The water from the Yaamba pumping station was then piped to a filtration plant at Mount Charlton (in The Caves) before being distributed through the city. The cost of the completed project was £400,000, a huge amount at that time, and considerably higher than the estimated cost of £114,000 when the project was approved by the Rockhampton City Council in 1914. Due to World War I, the need to raise the funds to build the new supply, and ongoing public opinion that a cheaper solution must be possible, construction did not commence until 24 January 1924 when James Larcombe turned the first sod. After the World War II, it became clear that the continued growth of Rockhampton combined with periods of drought would require more water than what was currently being sourced from Yaamba. While there was the possibility of a second pipeline from Yaamba, there had been ongoing problems with the build-up of sediment in the very long first pipeline reducing the volume of water, which were difficult and expensive to fix. Commencing in 1969, a barrage was built across the Fitzroy River in Rockhampton (between Wandal and Park Avenue) to prevent the salty tidal flows extending further up the river with the new Glenmore pumping station and water treatment works in Parkhurst completed in 1971. Yaamba pumping station is no longer in use. It is on the western side of Auckland Street (23.1438°S 150.3682°E).

== Demographics ==
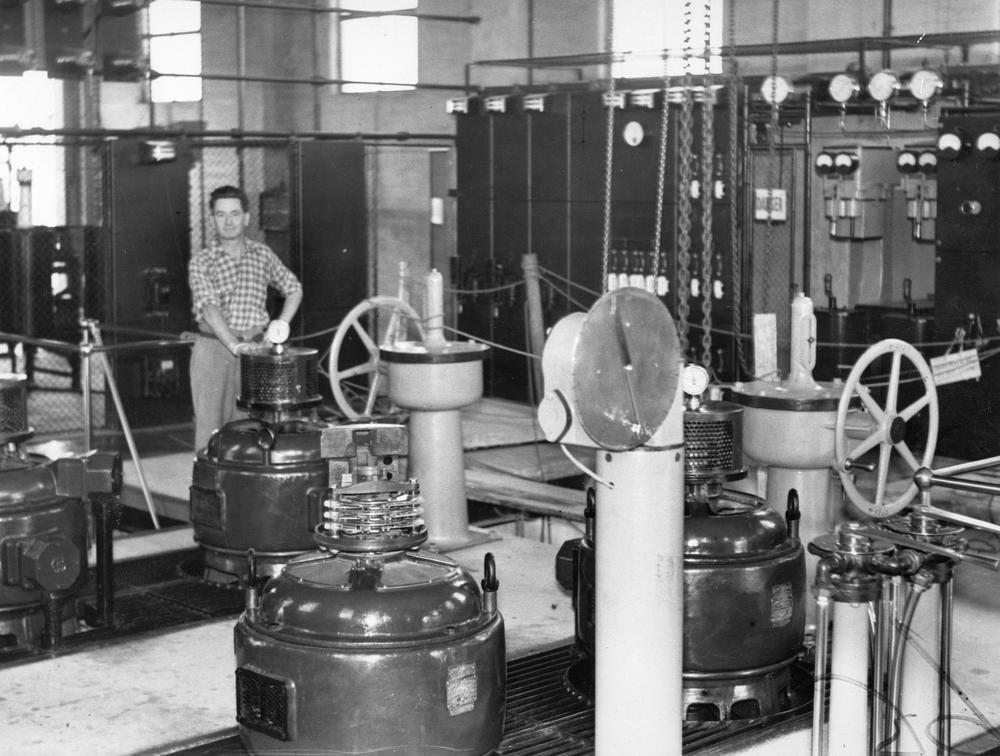
Worker at the controls at the Yaamba pumping station, 1935

In the 2016 census, the locality of Yaamba had a population of 62 people.

In the 2021 census, the locality of Yaamba had a population of 51 people.

== Education ==
There are no schools in Yaamba. The nearest government primary school is Milman State School in neighbouring Milman to the east. The nearest government secondary school is Glenmore State High School in Kawana in Rockhampton.

== Facilities ==
Yaamba Cemetery is on the south-eastern corner of Iris Street and Yaamba Siding Road (23.1333°S 150.3682°E). It is managed by the Livingstone Shire Council.
