= Corymbia xanthope =

Glen Geddes bloodwood

Conservation status
- Near Threatened (IUCN 3.1)

- Vulnerable (EPBC Act)

Scientific classification
- Kingdom: Plantae
- Clade: Tracheophytes
- Clade: Angiosperms
- Clade: Eudicots
- Clade: Rosids
- Order: Myrtales
- Family: Myrtaceae
- Genus: Corymbia
- Species: C. xanthope

Binomial name
- Corymbia xanthope (A.R.Bean & Brooker) K.D.Hill & L.A.S.Johnson

Synonyms
- Eucalyptus xanthope A.R.Bean & Brooker

Species of plant

Corymbia xanthope, commonly known as Glen Geddes bloodwood, is a species of tree that is endemic to a small area of Queensland. It has thick, rough bark on the trunk and branches with yellow bark visible underneath, lance-shaped to curved adult leaves, flower buds in groups of seven, creamy white flowers and urn-shaped fruit.

== Description ==
Corymbia xanthope is a tree that typically grows to a height of 12 m (39 ft) and forms a lignotuber. It has thick, rough, hard, tessellated bark on the trunk and branches with yellow bark visible underneath. Young plants and coppice regrowth have linear to narrow lance-shaped leaves that are paler on the lower surface, 48–100 mm (1.9–3.9 in) long and 7–20 mm (0.28–0.79 in) wide arranged in opposite pairs. Adult leaves are arranged alternately, lance-shaped to curved, much paler on the lower surface, 90–200 mm (3.5–7.9 in) long and 10–25 mm (0.39–0.98 in) wide, tapering to a petiole 8–22 mm (0.31–0.87 in) long. The flower buds are arranged on the ends of branchlets on a branched peduncle 6–16 mm (0.24–0.63 in) long, each branch of the peduncle with seven buds on pedicels 3–11 mm (0.12–0.43 in) long. Mature buds are oval to cylindrical, 7–8 mm (0.28–0.31 in) long and 4–5 mm (0.16–0.20 in) wide with a rounded to conical operculum. Flower occurs from February to April and the flowers are creamy white. The fruit is a woody urn-shaped capsule, 14–20 mm (0.55–0.79 in) long and 10–15 mm (0.39–0.59 in) wide, with a short neck.

== Taxonomy and naming ==
Glen Geddes bloodwood was first formally described in 1989 by Anthony Bean and Ian Brooker and given the name Eucalyptus xanthope. The description was published in the journal Austrobaileya from specimens collected by Bean near the Glen Geddes siding (about 50 km (31 mi) south of Marlborough) in 1988. In 1995 Ken Hill and Lawrie Johnson changed the name to Corymbia xanthope.

== Distribution and habitat ==
Corymbia xanthope grows in woodland communities with Eucalyptus fibrosa on ridges or slopes with sandy soils. It is found on the central coast of Queensland north of Rockhampton.

== Conservation status ==
This eucalypt is classified as "vulnerable" under the Australian Government Environment Protection and Biodiversity Conservation Act 1999 and the Queensland Government Nature Conservation Act 1992. The main threats to the species are destruction of trees and habitat disturbance caused by mining activities. The IUCN Red List assesses the species as Near Threatened.

== See also ==
- List of Corymbia species
