= Styphelia cuspidata =

Scientific classification
- Kingdom: Plantae
- Clade: Tracheophytes
- Clade: Angiosperms
- Clade: Eudicots
- Clade: Asterids
- Order: Ericales
- Family: Ericaceae
- Genus: Styphelia
- Species: S. cuspidata

Binomial name
- Styphelia cuspidata (R.Br.) Spreng.
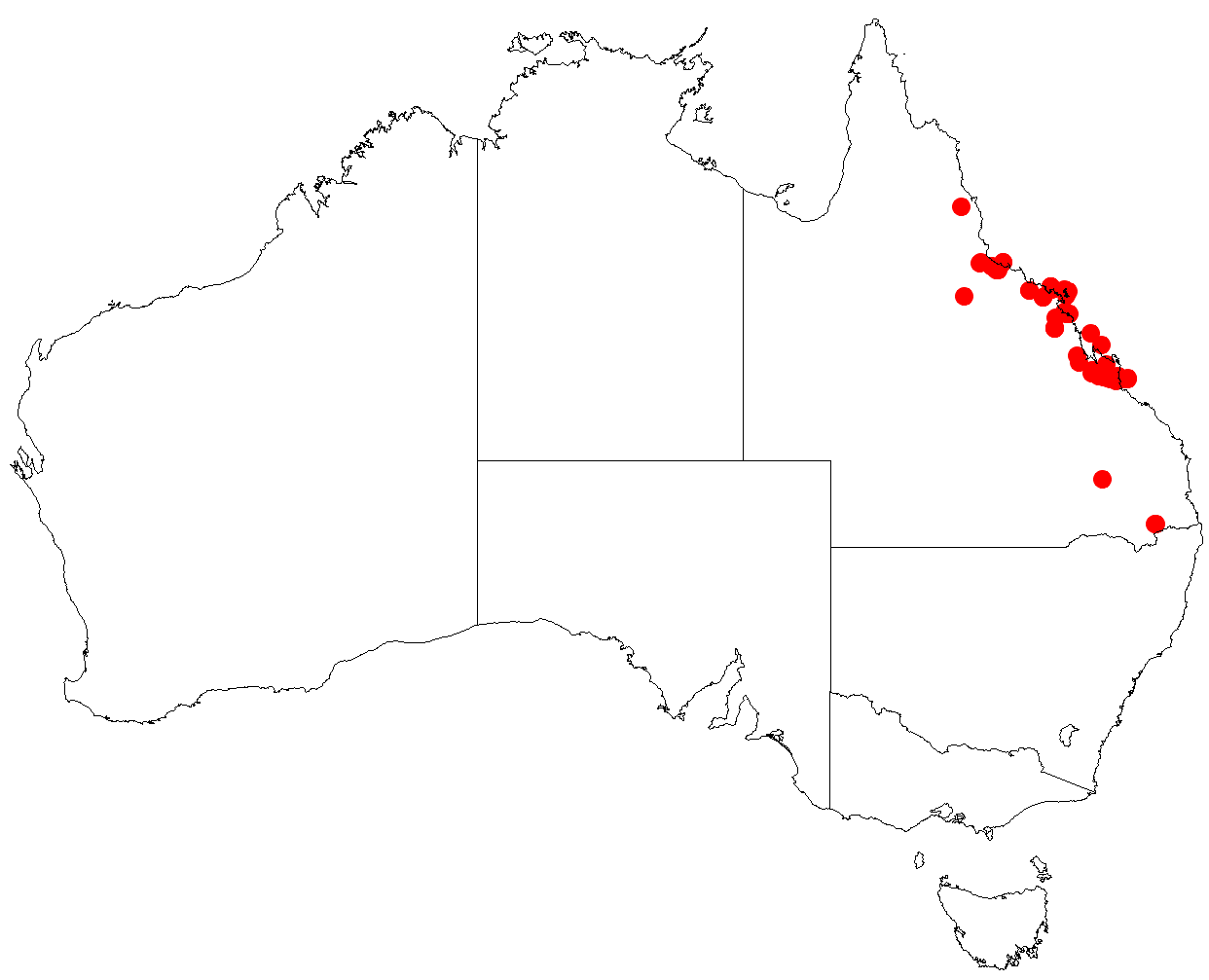
- Occurrence data from AVH

Synonyms
- Leucopogon cuspidatus R.Br.; Acrotriche aristata Benth.

Species of shrub

Styphelia cuspidata is a species of flowering plant in the family Ericaceae and is endemic to the central Queensland coast. It is a shrub with densely hairy young branchlets, egg-shaped to lance-shaped leaves with the narrower end towards the base, and white, bell-shaped flowers that are bearded inside.

== Description ==
Styphelia cuspidata is a shrub that typically grows to a height of 0.4–1.5 m (1 ft 4 in – 4 ft 11 in), its young branchlets densely hairy. The leaves are egg-shaped to lance-shaped with the narrower end towards the base, 10–18 mm (0.39–0.71 in) long and 2–4 mm (0.079–0.157 in) wide on a petiole about 0.5 mm (0.020 in) long. The leaves point upwards and have a sharply-pointed tip. The flowers are arranged in two to four upper leaf axils on a peduncle up to 1 mm (0.039 in) long, with egg-shaped to round bracts about 0.6 mm (0.024 in) long and bracteoles 1.0–1.3 mm (0.039–0.051 in) long. The sepals are lance-shaped, 2.3–3.1 mm (0.091–0.122 in) long and the petals white and form a bell-shaped tube 1.5–1.9 mm (0.059–0.075 in) long with lobes 1.8–2.2 mm (0.071–0.087 in) long and densely hairy inside. Flowering occurs in most months and the fruit is an elliptic drupe 2.8–3.3 mm (0.11–0.13 in) long.

== Taxonomy ==
This species was first formally described in 1810 by Robert Brown who gave it the name Leucopogon cuspidatus in Prodromus Florae Novae Hollandiae et Insulae Van Diemen. In 1824, Kurt Polycarp Joachim Sprengel transferred the species to Styphelia as S. cuspidata in Systema Vegetabilium. The specific epithet (cuspidata) means "cuspidate".

== Distribution and habitat ==
This species occurs in shrubland on hillsides and mountains on the Central Queensland coast between Hook Island in the north and Great Keppel Island and Gai-i in the south.
