= Milman, Queensland =

Milman
- Suburb
- Interactive map of Milman
- Coordinates: 23.1097°S 150.4222°E
- Country: Australia
- State: Queensland
- LGA: Livingstone Shire
- Location: 32.0 km (19.9 mi) N of Kawana; 37.3 km (23.2 mi) N of Rockhampton CBD; 667 km (414 mi) NNW of Brisbane

Government
  - State electorate: Mirani
  - Federal division: Capricornia

Area
  - Total: 67.7 km^{2} (26.1 sq mi)

Population
  - Total: 122 (2021 census)
  - Density: 1.802/km^{2} (4.667/sq mi)
- Time zone: UTC+10:00 (AEST)
- Postcode: 4702
Suburbs around Milman
Jardine	Jardine	Rossmoya
Yaamba	Milman	Wattlebank
Yaamba	Yaamba	The Caves

Milman is a rural locality in the Livingstone Shire, Queensland, Australia. In the 2021 census, Milman had a population of 122 people.

== Geography ==
Alligator Creek, a tributary of the Fitzroy River, forms the western boundary of the locality. The Bruce Highway and North Coast railway line pass through the south-west corner of the locality, which was served by the Milman railway station (23.1287°S 150.4009°E) which opened in 1913 but has since been abandoned.

The land use is farming, predominantly cattle grazing.

== History ==
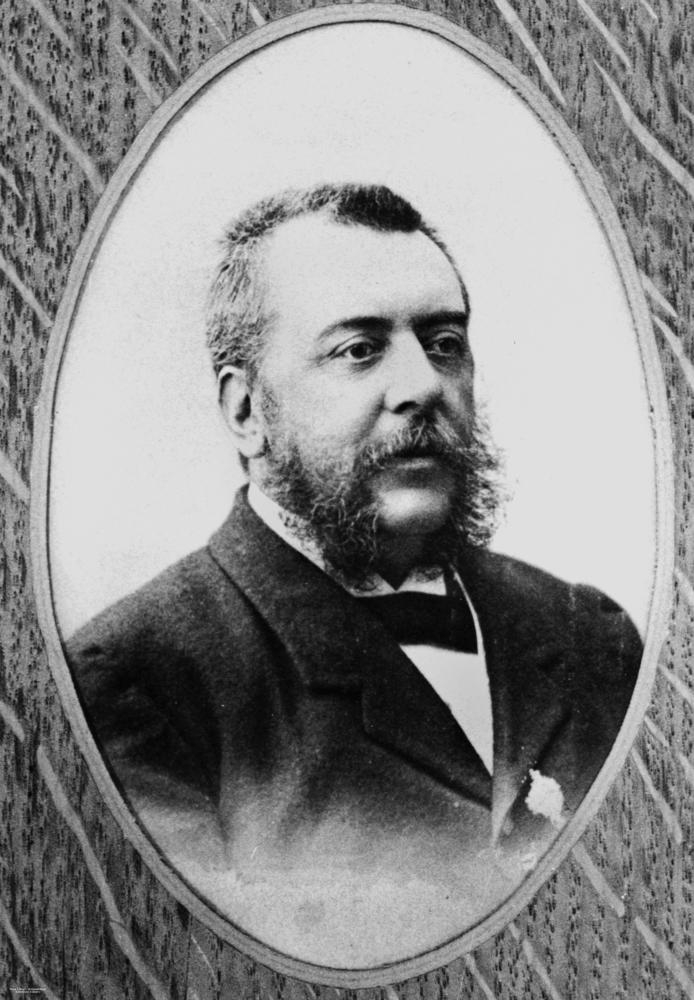
Hugh Milman, circa 1890

The locality is named after its railway station, which was named Milman on 20 October 1918 having previously been known as Jardine. It is thought that the Milman name refers to public servant Hugh Miles Milman who married Katherine Maule Jardine in 1871.

Jardine Provisional School opened on 11 August 1913, becoming Jardine State School on 1 December 1914. It was renamed Milman State School about 1934.

=== Settlement by the German immigrants ===
Milman was established as a settlement by German immigrants, arising from the initiative of Queensland Premier William Kidson of Queensland (19 January 1906 to 19 November 1907 and 18 February 1908 to 7 February 1911) who established a program to bring immigrants to Queensland to open the rural land. Kidson established a program calling for immigrants including Nominated Immigrants who were sponsored by residents of Queensland and the Queensland Government provided passage assistance.

There was much adversity for the immigrants to get to Australia. The immigrants for Jardine came principally from the impoverished working class residents of eastern Berlin. With the diplomatic conflict between Germany and England tensions high in the mid-1910s, owing to Germany's military expansionism, and the German Kaiser had forbidden any immigrants leaving Germany to other than German colonies. This meant immigrants had to first get to a foreign port to immigrate. The Jardine immigrants had to secretly leave Berlin and travel to London, through Amsterdam Holland, to board a ship for Queensland with the assistance of The Queensland Agent General. All communication prior to departure from Berlin was necessary by word of mouth to select the immigrants and secretly. No one could tell anyone they were leaving otherwise the police would have jailed the intending immigrants; school children could not tell their friends they would not be at school the next day.

Economic factors in Germany were a motivation for immigration. Germany has been a booming industrial power from the formation of Germany in 1871 up to 1900. From the beginning of 1908 something of a revival occurred to the German migration to Queensland, with a total of 778 settlers landing in Brisbane between February 1908 and the middle of 1910. This phenomenon was not unconnected with the downturn of the business cycle in Germany that commenced in 1907. While Niemeyer's emigrants were poor, they were positively well-off in comparison to most of those brought out by Bernoth. The latter included, according to Berlin police, persons who had been on poor relief; number of the Jardine immigrants would have been unemployed.

The first ship load of immigrants (brought to Australia from London aboard the S.S. Omrah) arrived on the banks of Alligator Creek on 11 January 1910. The second ship load of immigrants departed London on Friday 28 January 1910 and arrived on the banks of the Alligator Creek in late April 1910 having berthed in Brisbane aboard the S.S. Oswestry Grange on 23 March 1910. These immigrants had travelled by train from Berlin to Amsterdam to get to London undetected by the German authorities. The first ship's immigrants were affected by dengue fever upon arrival in Brisbane. When the second ship arrived the immigrants complained to the Imperial German Consul about the poor and contaminated food, and the poor hygiene of catering staff, on the vessel – this resulted in a Government inquiry and the complaint was upheld.

While in most other districts land would be surveyed and buyers would purchase surveyed blocks, the land in Jardine had not been surveyed before immigrants arrived and therefore the portions were unknown. On 18 November 1909 Mr. Staff Surveyor Ellis was instructed to ‘at once design the area’ - about 22,000 acres for Agricultural Farm selection; the scrub land into 160 acres; superior forest into 320 acres, and inferior forest into 640 to 1280 acre blocks. On 29 November 1909 Mr Ellis was additionally requested to make out one or more of the principal roads so that the Germans may be employed in clearing and forming the roads immediately on their arrival; permanent survey of the farms would follow. As early as mid November 1909 there was agreement by the Government, in response to Rev. M. Bernoth's request, that the immigrant men be employed clearing roads and ‘otherwise improving the area reserved for them’ but the Government directed that the cost of such improvement is added to the price of the land. If this had not been done the immigrants would have needed to find paid employment elsewhere. Mr. Ellis commenced the survey work on 29 November.

Inspector Turner of the Department of Works oversaw the settling-in of the immigrants and the road building works; his tenure was almost 12 months. He worked closely with the Lands Department, the surveyor and the Government in Brisbane. He was highly critical of the immigrant's manual skills both initially and even in his final report.

Inspector Turner can be credited with an enormous effort on his part to help them establish and even helping them during periods of extremely heavy rain and flooding of Alligator Creek (at one time swimming two flooded creeks to report their safety and arrange safety checking by the Yaamba Police ). The first ship load of immigrants arrived amid torrential rain on 11 January 1910 and already local flooding of streams feeding the Alligator Creek required that the settlers had to be taken by dray an additional distance of about 1½ Miles through the bush (expected to be along ridge lines to avoid flooded creeks). It was so boggy (‘4½ miles of sludge’) on the dirt tracks that the Inspector had to abandon the transfer from the landing point (forde – probably what is now Plentiful Creek Rd) on the Alligator Creek to the German Camp No 1 on the first day. The rain was so persistent that the balance of their goods, were not be delivered to their camp until 22 January.

On 18 January 1910 he reported finding ‘their camp in such an insanitary condition’. The immigrants had no bush skills, and the excessive rain would have inundated the site even though it was on a rise. He spent the day helping to reorganise the camp rather than starting work on the roads.

Camp 1 was an area 184’ [60 metres] by 99’ [32 metres] with a "bough shed 40’ (12m) by 13’ (4m) [presumably a common gathering place] in the middle, and eight fireplaces behind two rows of tents on each long side; a total of 30 tents for 25 families. These settlers had come from the poor areas of eastern Berlin (principally but not entirely) to canvas tents in the middle of heavy summer rains in virgin scrub. The conditions must have been unbearable as the rain was torrential; six families abandoned the camp by 20 January and a scathing letter was published in the Truth newspaper Brisbane about the conditions.

The first survey map was not published until about 11 April 1910.

The Parish was initially reserved for those known as "The Alligator Creek Group" and when the Government advertised the land for sale it was publicly listed for purchase exclusively by that group. There is no documentation to substantiate this but there are suggestions that the first group of immigrants believed they should have been given priority for the selection of the land because they had been working hard for almost four months building the roads before the second group arrived. There was in fact a ‘ballot’ conducted within The Alligator Creek Group, presumably overseen by Reverend Bernoth, who must have negotiated an equitable outcome; held sometime after the second boat load of settlers arrived but before August. The ballot was in fact only for the 160-acre lots because the one 512 acre lot (Portion 45), five surveyed 320 acre blocks (Portions 42, 43, 44, 46 and 47), and two unsurveyed blocks (Portions 71 and 72 - also 320 acres) were ‘agreed’ (as to who would get them), under some controversy, before the ballot. Also, there must have been an agreement with the Government that the outcome of this ballot within the Group would be accepted as applicants for the land once it came to be released by the Rockhampton Land Court. Most settlers moved from their Camps progressively and by mid September only three families remained in camps. The first release of the land in the Land Court was not until 7 December 1911 in the Government Gazette.

The financial structure required the selector signing a lease with the Government to pay the Rent and Survey Fee and also a mortgage to the Agricultural Bank of Queensland. While the bank did not receive payments they had the power to foreclose if the selector fell behind in payments; this occurred, for example, to Friedrich Herrmann Richard Lamain (Portion 54) when the bank disposed of the property to James Stafford Heaslip on 18 September 1929. Mr. Heaslip then continued the payments until freehold title was granted on 3 January 1936.

The railway line to Jardine did not exist when the settlers arrived in 1910. The extension of the railway beyond Rockhampton towards Mackay was commenced in 1912 and some of the Jardine settlers were employed on the line construction. The construction beyond Jardine was delayed by the need to complete the railway bridge across the Alligator Creek – a large bridge. On Saturday 28 June 1913 the North Coast Railway to Jardine was opened. 2000 people attended using three special trains from Rockhampton – the extension from Glenmore Junction was 21 miles and 4 chains. The line was opened beyond Jardine to Yaamba, a distance of 2 miles on 1 October 1913 after the construction of the Alligator Creek Railway Bridge. The opening of the Jardine railway station was a major step in the development of Jardine as it made it easy for the new settlers to get their produce to market. The railway station soon became a post office for delivery purpose initially and by February 1916 it had become a receiving post office. Approval for renaming of the railway station to Milman was reported in October 1916: whether this was as a result of the policy of removing German place names during World War 1 or that there already existed another station named Jardine Valley on the Great Northern Railway – which, in 1913, ran from Townsville to Duchess (later to Mt Isa); it was more likely the latter.

=== Establishment of the School ===
An Application for the Establishment of a State School was submitted on 3 August 1912 after earlier submissions to the Department of Public Instruction had failed. A School Building Committee consisting of Anton Nawarth, Max Menzel, Otto Raders, Johann Gardey and Louis Meyer (Secretary) had been elected on 13 March 1912.

On 30 October 1912 the Under Secretary of the Department Public Instruction replied to Mr. Meyer that until the district was more populated the educational needs of the children would be met by establishment of a tent school and the Railway Department had been requested to have a framed tent constructed; the Works Department would supply the necessary furniture, water tank and earth closets and the Department Public Instruction would find a teacher. There was some controversy as to where the school would be built. While the reserve was adjacent Portion 35, where the school was eventually built, this did not suit many parents whose children were on the other side of Mt Yaamba. Mr. Ferdinand Arthur Bahlinger offered 5 acres on his property (Portion 26) which was much closer to the majority of potential students and there were bitter feelings in the community about where the school should be located. The Government tried in vain to get the community to agree on the location, and the last application nominated the existing Crown Land School Reserve, yet controversy persisted with letters to the Minister by dissatisfied parties until the Minister finally made the decision.

The settlers must have had discussions with Railways and tried to get a framed tent with floor 40’ long and 12’ wide. The parents provided the teachers hut, as a condition of obtaining approval for a school and this completed by the settlers at their cost in February 1913. This was a stand-alone single-room sawn-timber hut 12’ by 8’ with a 6’ verandah along a long side and a water tank.

The first teacher was Mr. Karl August Mohr who ceased work at the Gurrumba school, a mining district 100 km west of Innisfail, on 30 July and arrived at Jardine on 7 August about 3 o’clock. The second letter to the Department on 8 August 1913 advised he had taken charge of the Jardine Provisional School on that day.

The names of the first school committee, elected at a meeting on 24 August 1913 attended by 18 settlers, was: Chairman Mr. Otto Haase, Secretary Mr. Louis Meyer, Treasurer Mr. Kurt Henke, Members Messrs Max Menzel and Frank Maleszka." The parents and settlers must have been devastated when Mr. Mohr did not return from Christmas holidays the next year, because of his untimely ill health, and he died the following year.

== Demographics ==
In the 2016 census, Milman had a population of 113 people.

In the 2021 census, Milman had a population of 122 people.

== Education ==
Milman State School is a government primary (Prep-6) school for boys and girls at 335 Milman Road (23.1060°S 150.4086°E). In 2016, the school had an enrolment of 7 students with 2 teachers and 3 non-teaching staff (1 full-time equivalent). In 2018, the school had an enrolment of 7 students with 2 teachers and 5 non-teaching staff (2 full-time equivalent).

There are no secondary schools in Milman. The nearest government secondary school is Glenmore State High School in Kawana, Rockhampton.
