= Kawana, Queensland (Rockhampton) =

Kawana
- Suburb
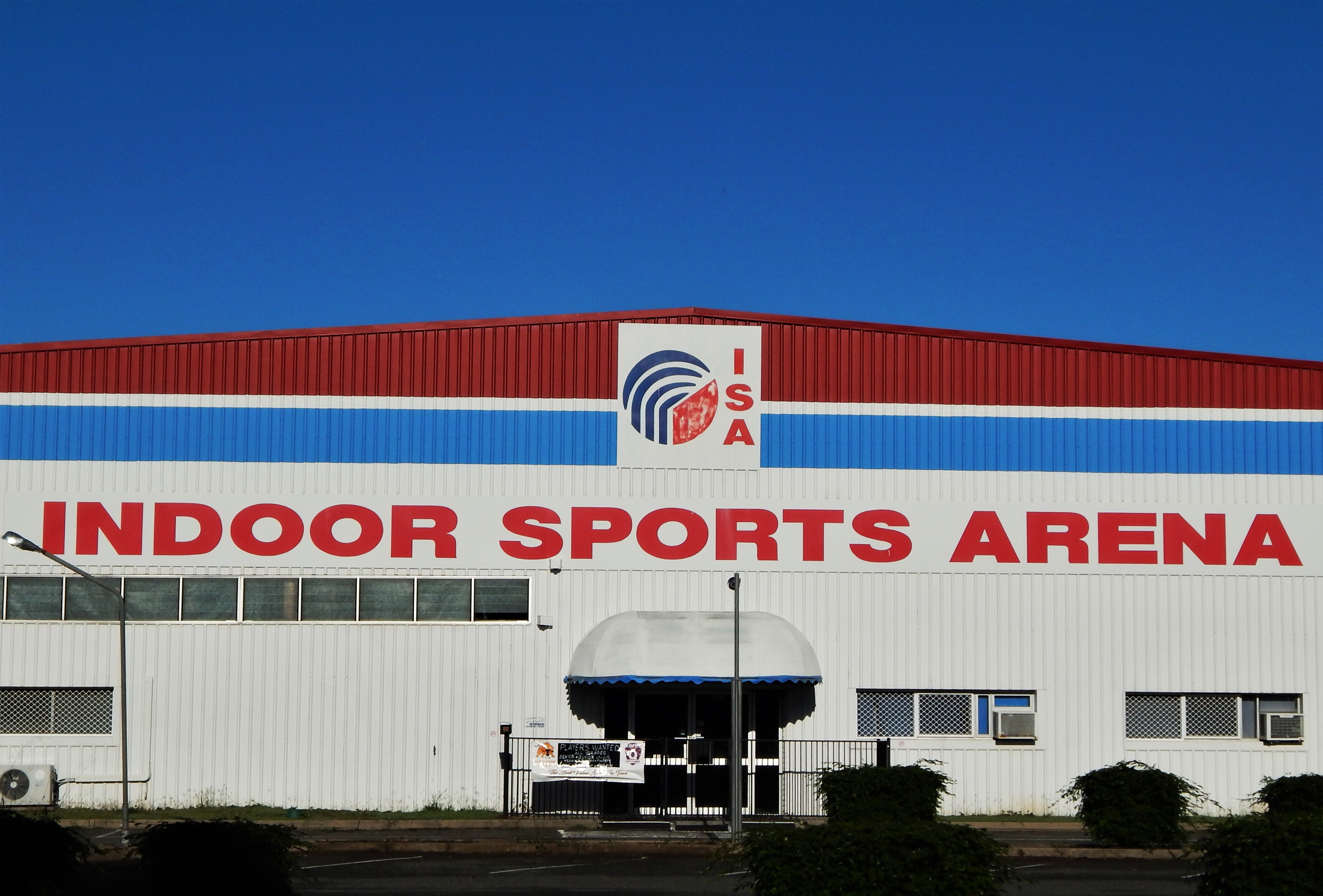
- Indoor Sports Arena

- Interactive map of Kawana
- Coordinates: 23.3377°S 150.5052°E
- Country: Australia
- State: Queensland
- City: Rockhampton
- LGA: Rockhampton Region
- Location: 5.5 km (3.4 mi) N of Rockhampton CBD; 620 km (390 mi) NNW of Brisbane

Government
  - State electorates: Rockhampton; Keppel
  - Federal division: Capricornia

Area
  - Total: 7.6 km^{2} (2.9 sq mi)

Population
  - Total: 4,434 (2021 census)
  - Density: 583/km^{2} (1,511/sq mi)
- Time zone: UTC+10:00 (AEST)
- Postcode: 4701
Suburbs around Kawana
Parkhurst	Parkhurst	Norman Gardens
Pink Lily	Kawana	Norman Gardens
Wandal	Park Avenue	Norman Gardens

Kawana is a suburb of Rockhampton in the Rockhampton Region, Queensland, Australia. In the 2021 census, Kawana had a population of 4,434 people.

== Geography ==
Kawana is bordered to the west by the Fitzroy River, to the north by Limestone Creek, to the east by Yaamba Road (part of the Bruce Highway), and to the south by Richardson Road.

Glenmore is a neighbourhood within the north-west of the suburb (23.3333°S 150.5°E).

The North Coast railway line enters the suburb from the south (Park Avenue) and exits to the north (Parkhurst). The suburb was originally served by the Kawana railway station (23.3402°S 150.5080°E), but it is now abandoned.

== History ==
Glenmore State School opened on 17 October 1889. The original building was built on the block of land on the other side of McLaughlin Street directly opposite the school's current lower oval. The first principal was Edward Costello. He served the school for 13 years until 1902. The original building was moved from the original site in November 1921 to a new site in Hinchcliff Street, about one kilometre away, where it remained in operation until 1970. Due to the rapid urbanisation of North Rockhampton in the late 1960s, a new school site was needed. In 1971 Glenmore State School relocated to its current site. This was overseen by the school's principal, Francis (Frank) Cridland, who served from 1971–1976. In 2014 the school celebrated its 125-year anniversary. The first Glenmore State School building is now the Country Women's Association hall.

Glenmore State High School opened on 28 January 1975.

In 1980, The Cathedral of Praise Church purchased a 19.5-acre (7.9 ha) site in Carlton Street. In November 1982, the worship centre and youth centre were opened. Cathedral of Praise Christian College opened on 31 January 1989. In 2003, the school was renamed Heights College.

== Demographics ==
In the 2016 census, Kawana had a population of 4,426 people.

In the 2021 census, Kawana had a population of 4,434 people.

== Education ==
Glenmore State School is a government primary (Prep–6) school for boys and girls at 241–259 Farm Street (23.3372°S 150.5148°E). In 2018, the school had an enrolment of 388 students with 34 teachers (31 full-time equivalent) and 28 non-teaching staff (18 full-time equivalent). It includes a special education program. The school also hosts:

- Rockhampton Intensive English Centre, a primary and secondary (4–12) intensive English language program
- a campus of the Capricornia School of Distance Education, a primary and secondary (Prep–12) school, headquartered in Emerald

Glenmore State High School is a government secondary (7–12) school for boys and girls on the corner of the Bruce Highway and Farm Street (23.3363°S 150.5167°E). In 2018, the school had an enrolment of 556 students with 52 teachers (51 full-time equivalent) and 33 non-teaching staff (25 full-time equivalent). It includes a special education program.

Heights College is a private primary and secondary (Prep–12) school at the corner of Carlton Street and Yaamba Road (23.3287°S 150.5155°E).

== Amenities ==
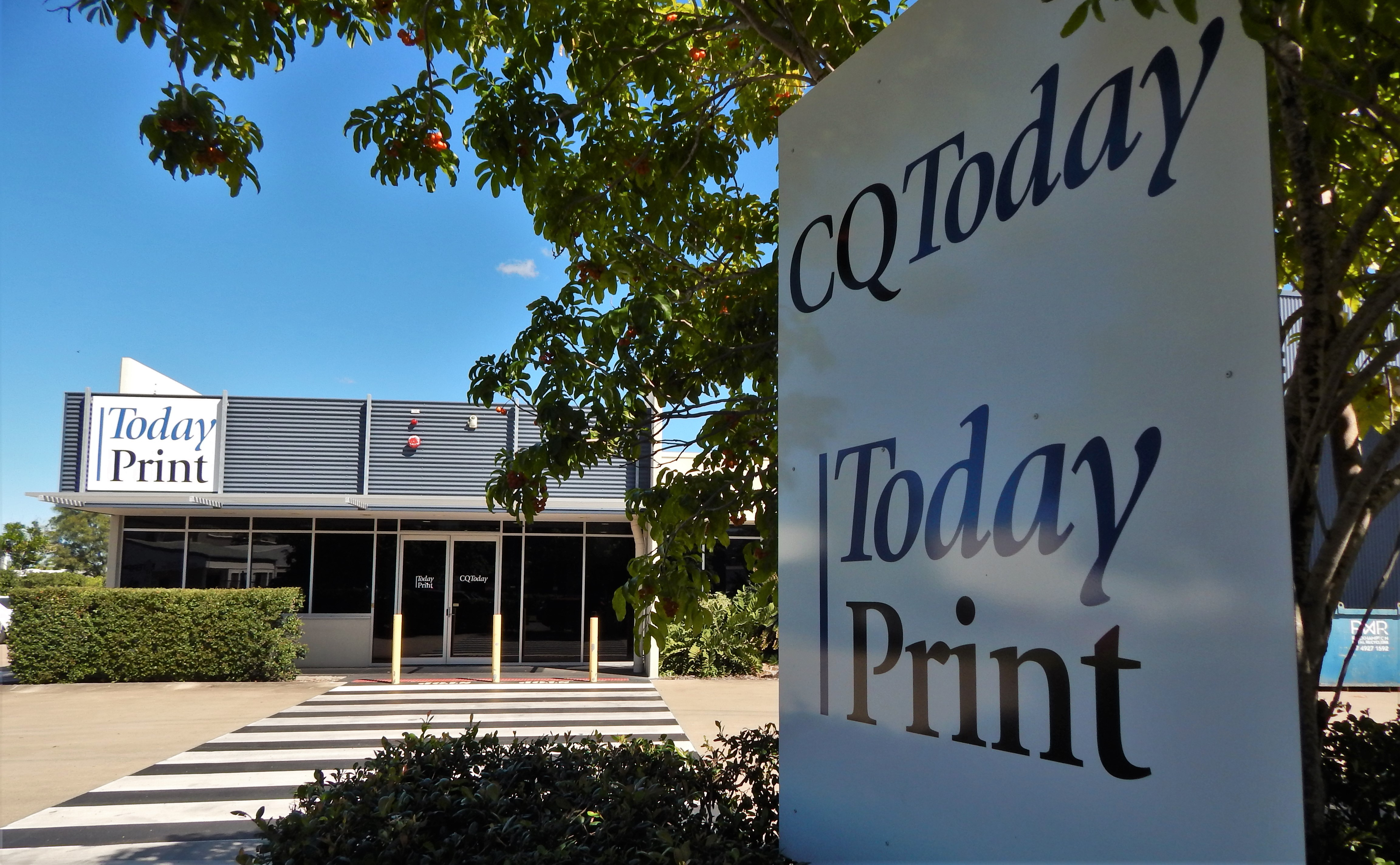
Today Print in Kawana, 2022

The Indoor Sports Arena Rockhampton is at 37–55 Hollingsworth Street (23.3484°S 150.5036°E). It has facilities for indoor netball, indoor cricket, indoor soccer, and outdoor facilities for beach volleyball.

Cathedral of Praise Church is at 276 Carlton Street (23.3288°S 150.5160°E).

The Today Print newspaper printing press operations and the offices of CQ Today are at 5–9 Hempenstall Street.(23.3378°S 150.5108°E) Operations at the print site re-commenced in 2021. This was following its closure in 2020 amid News Corporation's decision to cease the publication of most of their daily Queensland newspapers. The printing press operations had initially commenced at the site when they were relocated from the Bulletin Building in Quay Street in 2007.

== Attribution ==
This Wikipedia article includes content from "History". Glenmore State School. State of Queensland (Department of Education). 2021. Published under CC-BY-4.0 licence.
