= Alton Downs, Queensland =

Alton Downs
- Suburb
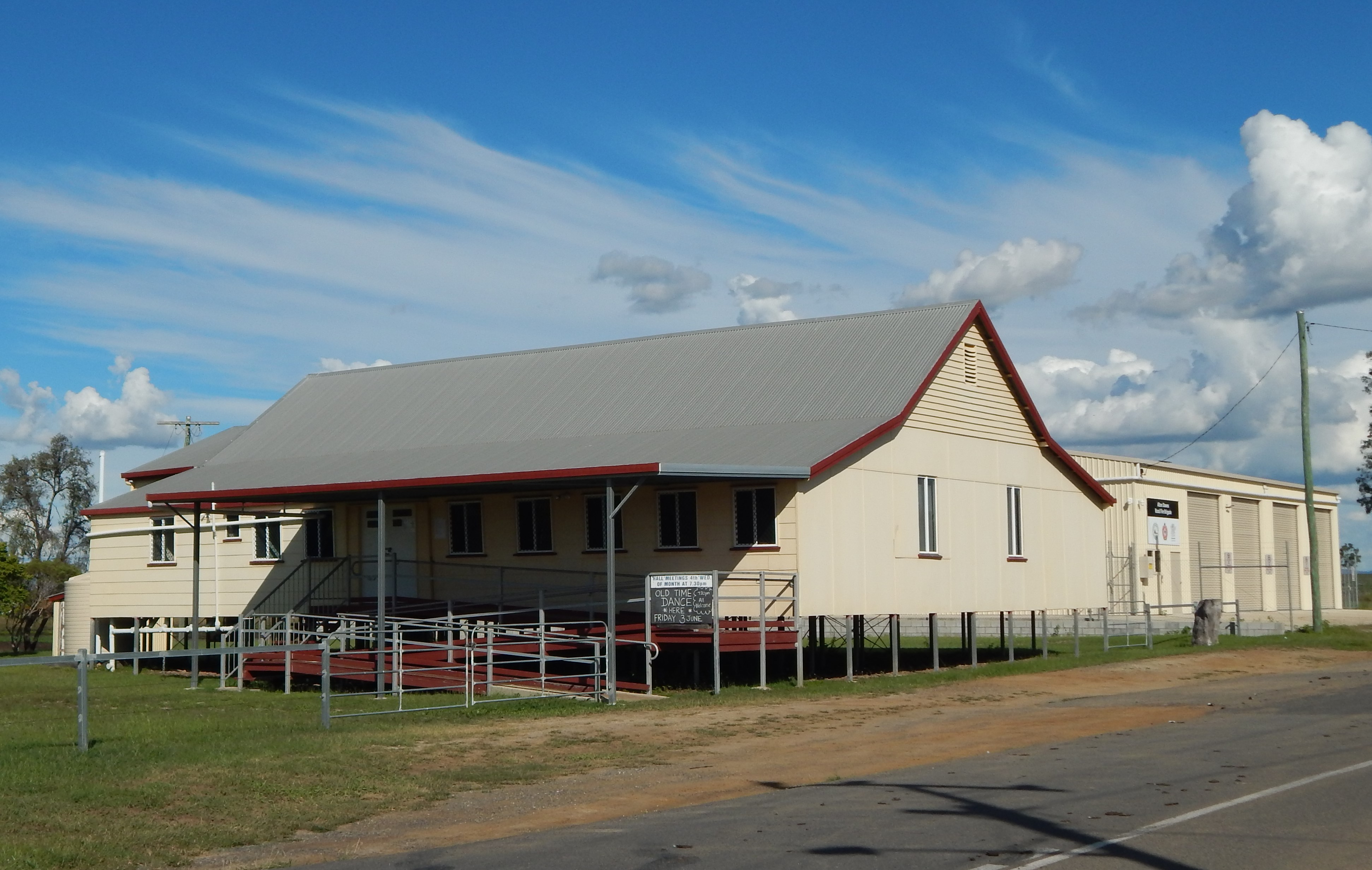
- Alton Downs Hall, 2022

- Interactive map of Alton Downs
- Coordinates: 23.3158°S 150.3644°E
- Country: Australia
- State: Queensland
- LGA: Rockhampton Region
- Location: 19.5 km (12.1 mi) NW of Rockhampton CBD; 665 km (413 mi) NNW of Brisbane

Government
  - State electorate: Mirani
  - Federal division: Flynn

Area
  - Total: 177.1 km^{2} (68.4 sq mi)

Population
  - Total: 1,324 (2021 census)
  - Density: 7.476/km^{2} (19.363/sq mi)
- Time zone: UTC+10:00 (AEST)
- Postcode: 4702
Suburbs around Alton Downs
South Yaamba	Etna Creek	Glendale
Ridgelands	Alton Downs	Glenlee
Dalma	Nine Mile	Pink Lily

Alton Downs is a rural locality in the Rockhampton Region, Queensland, Australia. In the 2021 census, Alton Downs had a population of 1,324 people.

== Geography ==
The Fitzroy River forms the northern and eastern boundary of the locality.

Mount Zion is in the north-east of the locality (23.2787°S 150.3915°E) and rises 91 metres (299 ft) above sea level.

Ridgelands Road enters the locality from the south-east (Pink Lily) and runs west through the locality.

The land use is a mixture of rural residential housing, grazing on native vegetation, with some crop growing.

== History ==
The locality name was derived from a pastoral property. The name was assigned to a railway station named by the Queensland Railways Department on 18 Aug 1916.

Alton Downs Provisional School opened on 10 February 1890. In 1908, it became Alton Downs State School. It closed on 26 March 1964. It was at 1247 Ridgelands Road (23.3071°S 150.3869°E).

Dalma Road Provisional School opened on 25 February 1901. On 1 January 1909, it became Dalma Road State School. It closed in 1934. It was at 32 Harding Road (north-west corner of Nicholson Road, 23.3454°S 150.3478°E).

The Alton Downs Community Hall officially opened on 2 January 1905.

The foundation stone for an Anglican church was laid on Sunday 20 January 1907. St James' Anglican Church opened in April 1907. The church was 34 by 22 feet (10.4 by 6.7 m) and 13 feet (4.0 m) high inside with a front porch and vestry. It was built by R. Cousins & Co using tongue-and-groove dressed hardwood.

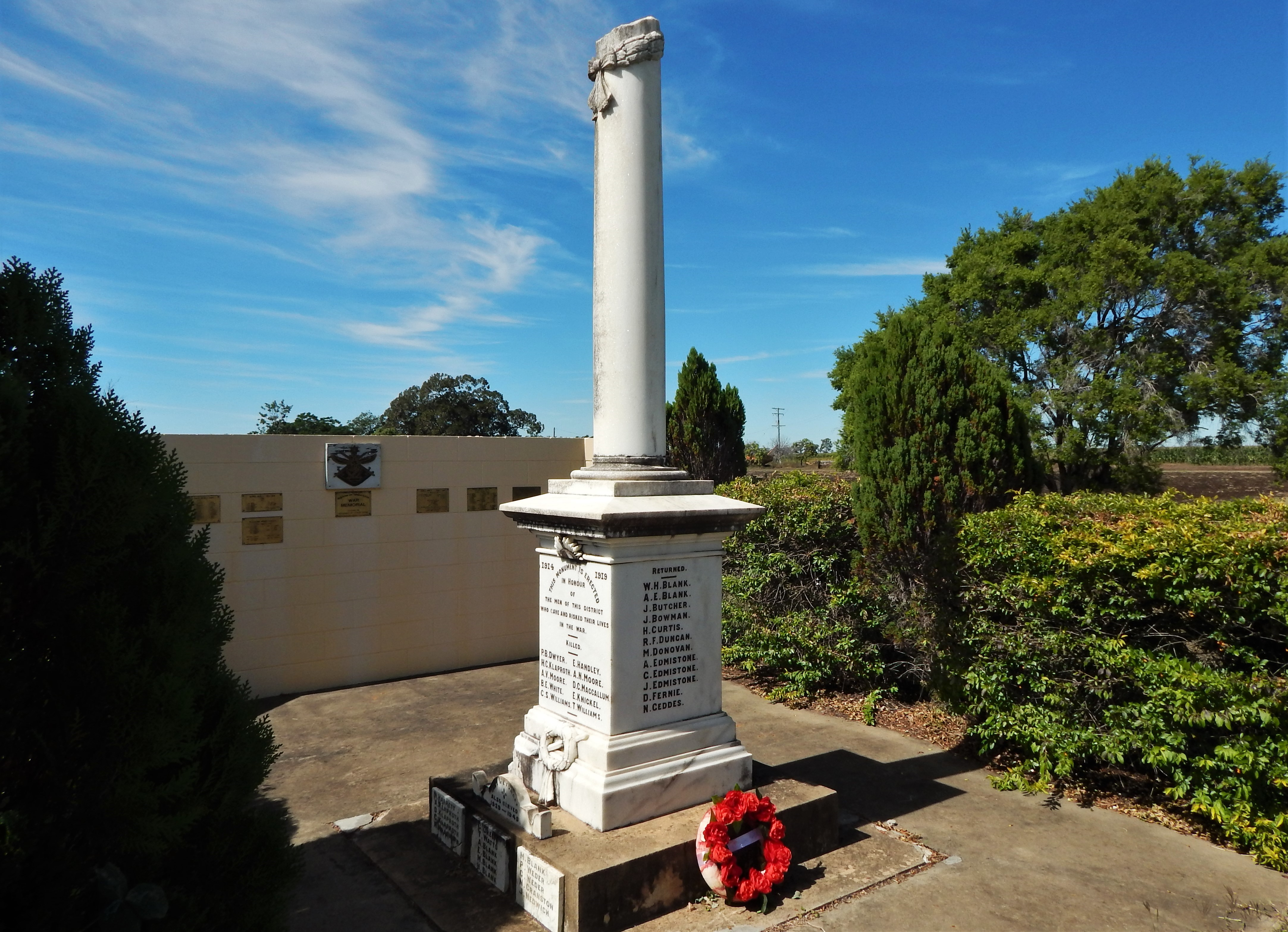
Alton Downs War Memorial, 2020

The Alton Downs War Memorial was officially unveiled on 16 October 1920 by Mrs H.G. Wheeler to honour those from the district who served in World War I. The memorial is made of Ulam marble and is a 12-foot (3.7 m) broken column (signifying young life cut short). It cost £180 to erect and the stonemason was Frederick Moulton Allan of Rockhampton.

A seven-hour siege occurred at Alton Downs on the night of 20 July 2000 after police responded to reports of a serious domestic dispute on a hobby farm where gunshots had been fired. Just after midnight on 21 July 2000, former air force officer Royce William Cooper fired a shot at Queensland Police Service dog squad officer Norm Watt who was hit in the leg. Watt subsequently bled to death from the bullet wound. Cooper later surrendered to police. A two-week trial was held at the Rockhampton Supreme Court in 2003 where Cooper pleaded not guilty. At the conclusion of the trial, a jury deliberated for five hours before finding Cooper guilty of murder. Justice Peter Dutney sentenced Cooper to life in prison. Watt is regularly remembered on the anniversary of his death and at events commemorating Queensland police officers who have been killed in the line of duty. In March 2020, a new police vessel was named in Watt's honour.

Access to a reliable water supply has been an ongoing concern for the Alton Downs community for many years. A public meeting was held in January 2020 which was attended by local residents and local state MP for Mirani Stephen Andrew. Residents voiced their concerns about never having been able have a main water pipeline established despite being in close proximity to the Fitzroy River. The unreliable water supply is a concern for the local rural fire brigade and many property owners are reliant on dams and bore water.

Following the easing of COVID-19 restrictions at the beginning of May 2020, an Alton Downs grazier opened his large sunflower field to the public who were able to purchase sunflower heads in exchange for a donation to charity. With the sunflowers in full bloom and with people having just been permitted to travel within a 50 kilometre radius on the Labour Day long weekend, the sunflower field proved to be popular with locals. An estimated 10,000 people visiting the field to and more than $25,000 was raised for charity. Police attended the sunflower field to ensure social distancing was being observed. The local farmer had previously stated in 2013 that he had planted the crop because sunflowers were beautiful to look at but had been surprised at the amount of attention the flowers had garnered from passing motorists who often stopped to take photos.

== Demographics ==
In the 2016 census, Alton Downs had a population of 1,278 people.

In the 2021 census, Alton Downs had a population of 1,324 people.

== Education ==
There are no schools in Alton Downs. The nearest government primary schools are Ridgelands State School in neighbouring Ridgelands to the north-west, The Hall State School in Wandal to the south-east, and Gracemere State School in Gracemere to the south. The nearest government secondary school is Rockhampton State High School in Wandal.

== Amenities ==
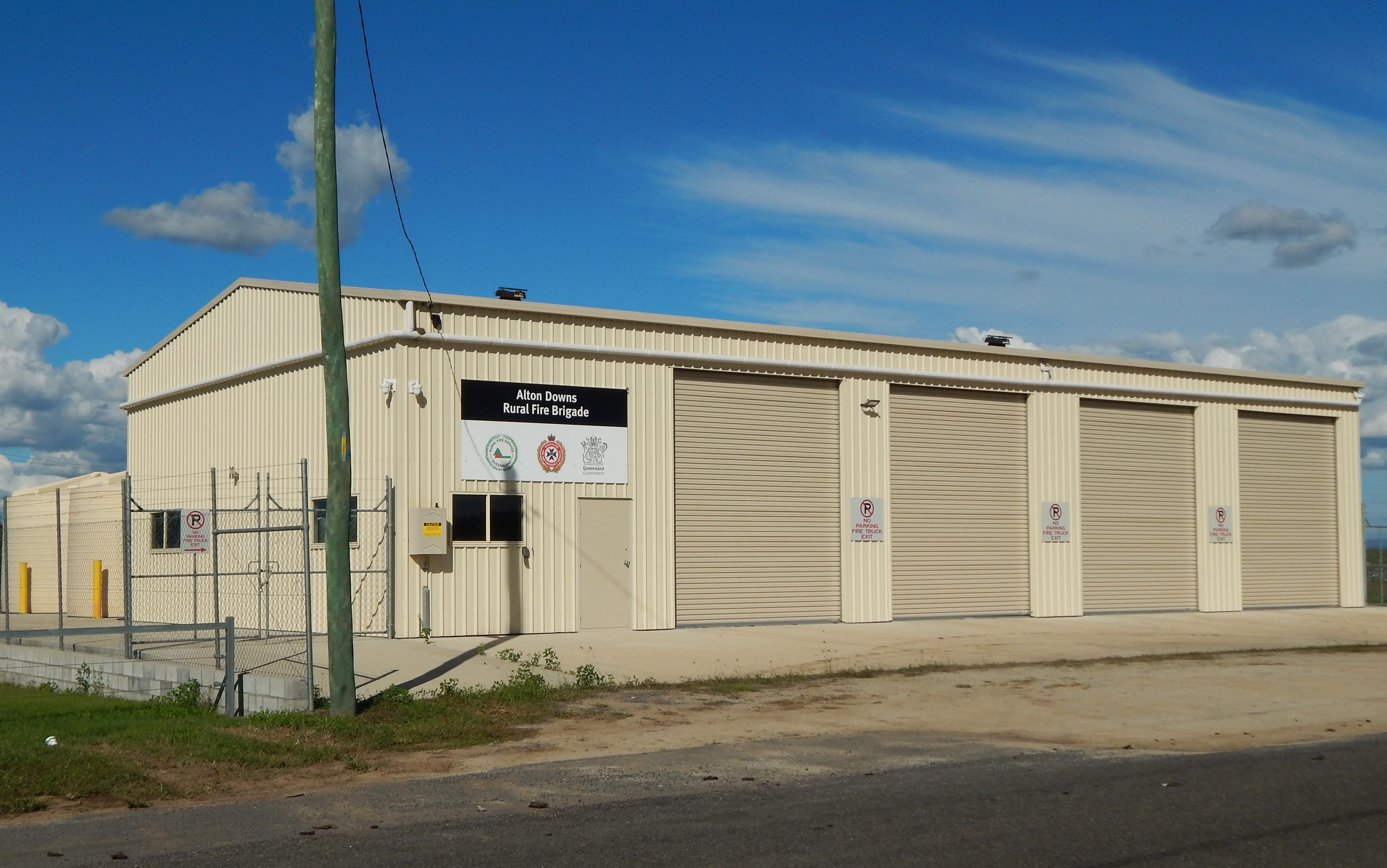
Alton Downs Rural Fire Brigade, 2022

The Alton Downs Community Hall is at 1569 Ridgelands Road (23.3028°S 150.3560°E). The Alton Downs War Memorial is in the grounds of the hall (23.3027°S 150.3563°E). It commemorates those who served and died in World War I and World War II.

Alton Downs Cemetery is at 78 McKenzie Road (23.3000°N 150.3895°E).
