= Ironpot =

Ironpot may refer to:

- Ironpot, Queensland (Livingstone Shire), a locality in Queensland, Australia
- Ironpot, Queensland (South Burnett Region), a locality in Queensland, Australia
