= Mulara, Queensland =

Mulara
- Suburb
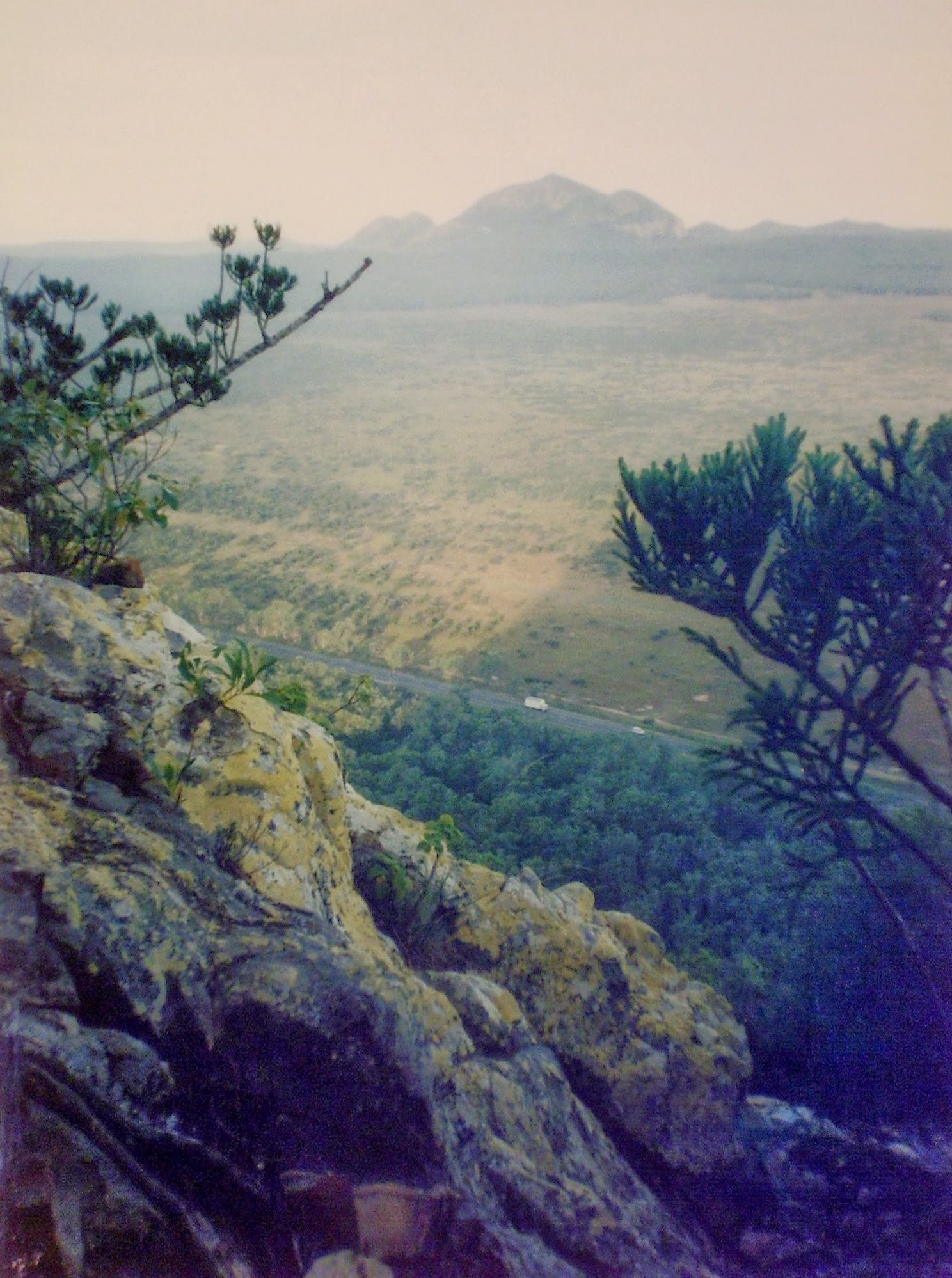
- Mulara

- Interactive map of Mulara
- Coordinates: 23.2061°S 150.6113°E
- Country: Australia
- State: Queensland
- LGA: Livingstone Shire
- Location: 16.6 km (10.3 mi) SW of Yeppoon; 25.0 km (15.5 mi) NE of Rockhampton CBD; 655 km (407 mi) NNW of Brisbane

Government
  - State electorate: Keppel
  - Federal division: Capricornia

Area
  - Total: 57.6 km^{2} (22.2 sq mi)

Population
  - Total: 93 (2021 census)
  - Density: 1.615/km^{2} (4.182/sq mi)
- Time zone: UTC+10:00 (AEST)
- Postcode: 4703
Suburbs around Mulara
Barmoya	Cobraball	Cobraball
Sandringham	Mulara	Bondoola
Sandringham	Ironpot	Cawarral

Mulara is a rural locality in the Livingstone Shire, Queensland, Australia. In the 2021 census, Mulara had a population of 93 people.

== Geography ==
The Rockhampton-Yeppoon Road (as Yeppoon Road) runs through from south to north-east.

== Demographics ==
In the 2016 census, Mulara had a population of 89 people.

In the 2021 census, Mulara had a population of 93 people.

== Education ==
There are no schools in Mulara. The nearest government primary schools are Yeppoon State School in Yeppoon to the north-east, Cawarral State School in neighbouring Cawarral to the south-east, and Parkhurst State School in Parkhurst, Rockhampton, to the south-west. The nearest government secondary schools are Yeppoon State High School in Yeppoon and Glenmore State High School in Kawana, Rockhampton.

== Surf lake ==
Yeppoon Surf Lake opened in Mulara in 2018. Located at 1662 Yeppoon Road, the large wave pool was originally established by Surf Lakes International as a research and development facility and not open to the general public. Surfer Mark Occhilupo was engaged as a surf industry advisor to the project. The site was upgraded in 2021 to include a learn-to-surf area.

Livingstone Shire Council gave approval on 18 January 2022 to the first stage of a proposed $187million development at the site which will see it open commercially and become a tourist attraction. The first stage is expected to incorporate a skate park, a scuba hole, playground, tourist accommodation and a solar farm.

== Amenities ==
Hedlow Airfield is at 221B Old Byfield Road (23.2207°S 150.6012°E). It has two sealed runways.
