= Sandringham, Queensland =

Sandringham
- Suburb
- Interactive map of Sandringham
- Coordinates: 23.2241°S 150.5383°E
- Country: Australia
- State: Queensland
- LGA: Livingstone Shire
- Location: 17.4 km (10.8 mi) NNE of Kawana; 22.4 km (13.9 mi) NNE of Rockhampton CBD; 26.8 km (16.7 mi) SW of Yeppoon; 652 km (405 mi) NNW of Brisbane

Government
  - State electorates: Keppel; Mirani
  - Federal division: Capricornia

Area
  - Total: 49.9 km^{2} (19.3 sq mi)

Population
  - Total: 49 (2021 census)
  - Density: 0.982/km^{2} (2.543/sq mi)
- Time zone: UTC+10:00 (AEST)
- Postcode: 4701
Suburbs around Sandringham
The Caves	Barmoya	Cobraball
Etna Creek	Sandringham	Mulara
Rockyview	Limestone Creek	Ironpot

Sandringham is a rural locality in the Livingstone Shire, Queensland, Australia. In the 2021 census, Sandringham had a population of 49 people.

== Geography ==
The land use is grazing on native vegetation.

== Demographics ==
In the 2016 census, Sandringham had a population of 45 people.

In the 2021 census, Sandringham had a population of 49 people.

== Education ==
There are no schools in Sandringham. The nearest government primary schools are The Caves State School in neighbouring The Caves to the north-east, Cawarral State School in Cawarral to the east, and Parkhurst State School in Parkhurst, Rockhampton, to the south. The nearest government secondary school is Glenmore State High School in Kawana, Rockhampton, to the south.
