= Glendale, Queensland =

Glendale
- Suburb
- Interactive map of Glendale
- Coordinates: 23.2458°S 150.4544°E
- Country: Australia
- State: Queensland
- LGA: Shire of Livingstone
- Location: 11.0 km (6.8 mi) NNW of Parkhurst; 20.3 km (12.6 mi) N of Rockhampton CBD; 661 km (411 mi) NNW of Brisbane

Government
  - State electorate: Mirani
  - Federal division: Capricornia

Area
  - Total: 21.9 km^{2} (8.5 sq mi)

Population
  - Total: 600 (2021 census)
  - Density: 27.4/km^{2} (71/sq mi)
- Time zone: UTC+10:00 (AEST)
- Postcode: 4711
Suburbs around Glendale
Etna Creek	Etna Creek	Etna Creek
Alton Downs	Glendale	Glenlee
Glenlee	Glenlee	Glenlee

Glendale is a rural locality in the Shire of Livingstone, Queensland, Australia. In the 2021 census, Glendale had a population of 600 people.

== Geography ==
The locality is bounded to the north by Etna Creek (the watercourse), to the south-west by the Fitzroy River, and to the south and south-east by Belmont Creek.

The land use is predominantly grazing on native vegetation, apart from two areas of rural residential housing, one in the west of the locality near the Fitzroy River and the other in the south-east of the locality along Belmont Creek.

== History ==
Historically, the locality has been used for grazing, but, from the mid-1980s, there has been subdivision to create large lots for rural residential housing. Between 2008 and 2014, all of the Shire of Livingstone was part of the Rockhampton Region, until the Shire of Livingstone was reinstated following a vote of its residents.

=== 2019 proposal to transfer to the Rockhampton Region ===
In 2019, a proposal was put forward that the localities of Glenlee, Rockyview and Glendale (all within the Shire of Livingstone) should become part of the Rockhampton Region. The main rationales for the change were that these localities lay in the path of suburban growth to the north of Rockhampton and that the residents of these localities used the services and facilities within the Rockhampton Region rather than those of the Shire of Livingstone. The proposal highlighted the different planning priorities between the two local governments with Rockhampton Region wishing to develop more suburban housing and associated amenities with smaller land parcels, while the Shire of Livingstone preferred to have larger land parcels to retain its rural and rural residential character. Given the unpopularity of the forced 2008 amalgamation, there was suspicion among shire residents that the proposal was another attempt to achieve amalgamation through progressive loss of localities to the Rockhampton Region. Following a number of investigations and public consultations, it was decided in October 2022 not to change the local government boundaries.

== Demographics ==
In the 2016 census, Glendale had a population of 614 people.

In the 2021 census, Glendale had a population of 600 people.

== Education ==
There are no schools in Glendale. The nearest government primary school is Parkhurst State School in Parkhurst, Rockhampton, to the south-east. The nearest government secondary school is Glenmore State High School in Kawana, Rockhampton, to the south-east.

== Amenities ==
Sondra Lena Park is in Glendale Road (23.2437°S 150.4871°E). It was named after Police Constable Sondra Lena who was killed on 10 April 1992 when she was hit by a car at a roadblock during a search for a prison escapee.
