= Etna Creek =

- Suburb
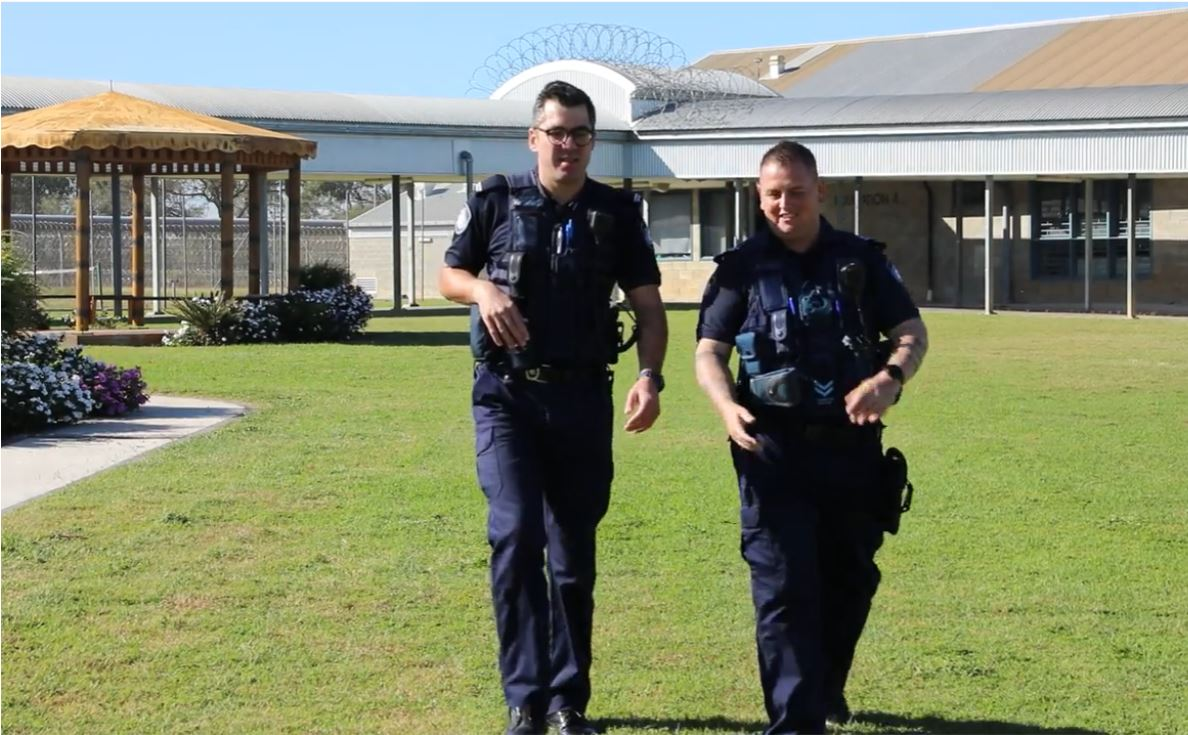
- Capricornia Correctional Centre

- Interactive map of Etna Creek
- Coordinates: 23.2288°S 150.4222°E
- Country: Australia
- State: Queensland
- LGA: Livingstone Shire
- Location: 5.5 km (3.4 mi) SSE of The Caves; 19.9 km (12.4 mi) NNW of Rockhampton; 660 km (410 mi) NNW of Brisbane

Government
  - State electorate: Mirani
  - Federal division: Capricornia

Area
  - Total: 69.4 km^{2} (26.8 sq mi)

Population
  - Total: 1,029 (2021 census)
  - Density: 14.827/km^{2} (38.40/sq mi)
- Time zone: UTC+10:00 (AEST)
- Postcode: 4702
Suburbs around Etna Creek
| Yaamba | The Caves | Sandringham |
| South Yaamba | Etna Creek | Rockyview |
| Alton Downs | Glendale | Glenlee |

Etna Creek is a rural locality in the Livingstone Shire, Queensland, Australia. In the 2021 census, Etna Creek had a population of 1,029 people.

== Geography ==
The Fitzroy River bounds the locality to the south-west, west, and north-west.

Etna Creek (the watercourse) rises in The Caves to the north and flows in a generally south-westly direction through the locality of Etna Creek, forming a short section of its southern boundary before flowing back into the locality and becoming the tributary of Fitzroy River in the south-west of the locality (23.24062°S 150.41084°E). Immediately east of the creek mouth is Long Island Bend Conservation Park, which includes an unnamed island in the Fitzroy River and part of the mainland, a total of 25 hectares (62 acres).

Boomerang Lagoon is a large waterhole in the south-west of the locality (23.24298°S 150.37666°E).

South Yaamba is a town (23.1988°S 150.4005°E) in the north-east of locality. The town of South Yaamba is not to be confused with the locality of South Yaamba, which is adjacent and to the west of the locality of Etna Creek. The locality of South Yaamba is physically separated from the town of South Yaamba and the locality of Etna Creek by the Fitzroy River.

The Bruce Highway (known as Yaamba Road within the locality) enters the locality from the south-west (Glenlee / Rockyview) and exits to the north (The Caves).

The North Coast railway line enters the locality from the south (Glendale) and exits to the north (The Caves). Etna Creek railway station is an abandoned railway station on the line (23.2076°S 150.4765°E). The highway and railway line run loosely parallel through the locality.

== History ==
The locality takes its name from the Etna Creek railway station, which was assigned by the Queensland Railways Department on 23 July 1914.

South Yaamba takes its name from the pastoral run name given by pastoralist Peter Fitzallan MacDonald in the 1860s. Yaamba is believed to be an Aboriginal word meaning main camping ground.

In 1891, residents in Etna Creek employed a private teacher for their children, while lobbying the Queensland Government to establish a school with Mr P. Hinz offering a 2-acre (0.81 ha) site close to the main Yaamba Road for the school. Etna Creek Provisional School opened on 31 October 1892. On 1 January 1909, it became Etna Creek State School. In September 1910, it had an average attendance of 13 students. It was on the Yaamba Road near the intersection with the railway line (approx 23.22511°S 150.48075°E). In 1922, a new school building was approved with an expected cost of £631 on a new site. The school closed in 1950. It was at 479 Etna Creek Road ()23.21345°S 150.43203°E).

Long Island Bend Conservation Park was gazetted on 16 December 1994 under the Nature Conservation Act 1992. No specific purpose was identified in the gazettal.

== Demographics ==
In the 2016 census, Etna Creek had a population of 792 people.

In the 2021 census, Etna Creek had a population of 1,029 people.

== Education ==
There are no schools in Etna Creek. The nearest government primary schools are The Caves State School in neighbouring The Caves to the north and Parkhurst State School in Parkhurst, Rockhampton, to the south-east. The nearest government secondary school is Glenmore State High School in Kawana, Rockhampton, to the south-east.

== Facilities ==
Capricornia Correctional Centre is a prison on Meldrum Road, off the Bruce Highway (23.2302°S 150.4721°E). It provides facilities for remand, reception and sentenced prisoners. It caters for high security prisoners and has a farm complex for low security prisoners.

Etna Creek SES Facility is on Olives Road (23.2279°S 150.4720°E).
