= Rockhampton (disambiguation) =

Rockhampton is a city in Queensland, Australia.

Rockhampton may also refer to related topics:

- Rockhampton City, Queensland, the central suburb of Rockhampton, Queensland
- Rockhampton Region, the local government area surrounding Rockhampton, Queensland
- Rockhampton Morning Bulletin, newspaper published in Rockhampton, Queensland
- Rockhampton Airport, an airport serving Rockhampton, Queensland
- Rockhampton Correctional Centre, a prison near Rockhampton, Queensland
- City of Rockhampton, a former local government area in Queensland
- Town of North Rockhampton, a former local government area in Queensland
- Electoral district of Rockhampton, Queensland, Australia
- Electoral district of Rockhampton North, Queensland, Australia
- Electoral district of Rockhampton South, Queensland, Australia
- Anglican Diocese of Rockhampton, Queensland
- Roman Catholic Diocese of Rockhampton, Queensland
- West Rockhampton, Queensland, a suburb of Rockhampton, Queensland

Alternatively, it may refer to:

- Rockhampton, Gloucestershire, a village in South Gloucestershire, England
