= Glenlee, Queensland =

Glenlee
- Suburb
- Interactive map of Glenlee
- Coordinates: 23.2902°S 150.4686°E
- Country: Australia
- State: Queensland
- LGA: Livingstone Shire
- Location: 14.8 km (9.2 mi) N of Kawana; 19.2 km (11.9 mi) N of Rockhampton CBD; 36.2 km (22.5 mi) SW of Yeppoon; 644 km (400 mi) NNW of Brisbane

Government
  - State electorates: Mirani; Rockhampton
  - Federal division: Capricornia

Area
  - Total: 42.0 km^{2} (16.2 sq mi)

Population
  - Total: 1,193 (2021 census)
  - Density: 28.40/km^{2} (73.57/sq mi)
- Time zone: UTC+10:00 (AEST)
- Postcode: 4711
Suburbs around Glenlee
Alton Downs	Glendale	Etna Creek
Alton Downs	Glenlee	Rockyview
Alton Downs	Pink Lily	Parkhurst

Glenlee is a rural locality in the Livingstone Shire, Queensland, Australia. In the 2021 census, Glenlee had a population of 1,193 people.

== Geography ==
The locality is bounded by an unnamed creek to the north, Yaamba Road to the east, Ramsay Creek to the south-east, and the Fitzroy River to the south-west and west.

The North Coast railway line enters the locality from the south-east (Parkhurst) and exits to the north-east (Glendale).

== History ==
The School of Today opened in 1996. Some time prior to 2007, it was renamed Glenlee Christian College. The school was established by parents whose children who suffered from sensitivities to chemicals or who had learning difficulties linked to environmental factors. Therefore the school was established in a rural area away from the pollution of traffic and urban activities. As of 2007, the school had nine students and one teacher. It was located at 46 Dawson Road (23.2522°S 150.4938°E) just to the east of the North Coast railway line. The school subsequently closed.

In January 2016, Carinity Education Rockhampton established a school on the site of the Glenlee Christian College.

=== 2019 proposal to transfer the locality to the Rockhampton Region ===
In 2019, a proposal was put forward that the localities of Glenlee, Rockyview and Glendale (all within the Shire of Livingstone) should become part of the Rockhampton Region. The main rationales for the change were that these localities lay in the path of suburban growth to the north of Rockhampton and that the residents of these localities used the services and facilities within the Rockhampton Region rather than those of the Shire of Livingstone. The proposal highlighted the different planning priorities between the two local governments with Rockhampton Region wishing to develop more suburban housing and associated amenities with smaller land parcels, while the Shire of Livingstone preferred to have larger land parcels to retain its rural and rural residential character. Given the unpopularity of the forced 2008 amalgamation, there was suspicion among shire residents that the proposal was another attempt to achieve amalgamation through progressive loss of localities to the Rockhampton Region. Following a number of investigations and public consultations, it was decided in October 2022 not to change the local government boundaries.

== Demographics ==
In the 2016 census, Glenlee had a population of 1,236 people.

In the 2021 census, Glenlee had a population of 1,193 people.

== Education ==
Carinity Education Rockhampton is a private secondary (7-12) school for boys and girls at 46 Dawson Road (23.2527°S 150.4936°E). In 2017, the school had an enrolment of 89 students with 6 teachers and 11 non-teaching staff (9 full-time equivalent). The school caters for students who have disengaged with mainstream education or are risk of doing so.

There are no mainstream schools in Glenlee. The nearest government primary school is Parkhurst State School in neighbouring Parkhurst to the south-west. The nearest government secondary school is Glenmore State High School in Kawana to the south.
