= Ironpot, Queensland (Livingstone Shire) =

Ironpot
- Suburb
- Interactive map of Ironpot
- Coordinates: 23.27°S 150.5997°E
- Country: Australia
- State: Queensland
- LGA: Livingstone Shire
- Location: 16.9 km (10.5 mi) NE of Kawana; 19.2 km (11.9 mi) SW of Yeppoon; 21.8 km (13.5 mi) NE of Rockhampton CBD; 662 km (411 mi) NNW of Brisbane

Government
  - State electorate: Keppel
  - Federal division: Capricornia

Area
  - Total: 36.4 km^{2} (14.1 sq mi)

Population
  - Total: 184 (2021 census)
  - Density: 5.055/km^{2} (13.09/sq mi)
- Time zone: UTC+10:00 (AEST)
- Postcode: 4701
Suburbs around Ironpot
Sandringham	Mulara	Mulara
Limestone Creek	Ironpot	Cawarral
Limestone Creek	Mount Chalmers	Mount Chalmers

Ironpot is a rural locality in the Livingstone Shire, Queensland, Australia. In the 2021 census, Ironpot had a population of 184 people.

== Geography ==
The Rockhampton-Yeppoon Road (also known as Yeppoon Road) enters the locality from the south-west (Limestone Creek) and exits to the north-east (Mulara).

The southern corner of the locality is within the Mount Archer State Forest which extends into neighbouring Limestone Creek and Mount Chalmers. Mount Nicholson is within the state forest (23.3133°S 150.6042°E) rising to 572 metres (1,877 ft) above sea level.

The land use is predominantly grazing on native vegetation with rural residential housing in the centre and south-west of the locality.

== Demographics ==
In the 2016 census, Ironpot had a population of 159 people.

In the 2021 census, Ironpot had a population of 184 people.

== Education ==
There are no schools in Ironpot. The nearest government primary schools are Cawarral State School in neighbouring Cawarral to the east and Parkhurst State School in Parkhurst, Rockhampton, to the south-west. The nearest government secondary schools are Glenmore State High School in Kawana, Rockhampton to the south-west and Yeppoon State High School in Yeppoon to the north-east.
