= Limestone Creek, Queensland =

Limestone Creek
- Suburb
- Interactive map of Limestone Creek
- Coordinates: 23.2883°S 150.5652°E
- Country: Australia
- State: Queensland
- LGA: Rockhampton Region
- Location: 14.4 km (8.9 mi) NE of Rockhampton CBD; 650 km (400 mi) NNW of Brisbane

Government
  - State electorate: Keppel
  - Federal division: Capricornia

Area
  - Total: 22.8 km^{2} (8.8 sq mi)

Population
  - Total: 179 (2021 census)
  - Density: 7.85/km^{2} (20.33/sq mi)
- Time zone: UTC+10:00 (AEST)
- Postcode: 4701
Suburbs around Limestone Creek
Rockyview	Sandringham	Ironpot
Parkhurst	Limestone Creek	Ironpot
Norman Gardens	Mount Archer	Mount Chalmers

Limestone Creek is a suburb in the Rockhampton Region, Queensland, Australia. In the 2021 census, Limestone Creek had a population of 179 people.

== Geography ==
The Rockhampton-Yeppoon Road (as Yeppoon Road) enters the locality from the south-east (Parkhurst / Norman Gardens) and exits to the north-east (Ironpot).

The creek Limestone Creek rises in the south-east of the locality and forms most of the south-east boundary of the locality before flowing west loosely parallel and north of the Yeppoon Road, exiting the locality to the west (Parkhurst) where it becomes a tributary of the Fitzroy River, which flows into the Coral Sea.

Limestone Creek has the following mountains along its southern boundary (from west to east):

- Mount Chapple (23.3091°S 150.5551°E) 435 metres (1,427 ft)
- Mount Wiseman (23.3027°S 150.5642°E) 306 metres (1,004 ft)
- Mount Ellida (23.3046°S 150.5852°E) 432 metres (1,417 ft)

Seeonee Park is a 600-acre (240 ha) park in the west of the locality. Operated by Scouts Queensland, it provides camping and other recreational facilities for community groups.

In the south-east of the locality are two small sections of the protected areas:

- Mount Archer National Park which extends into neighbouring Mount Archer to the south
- Mount Archer State Forest which extends into neighbouring Ironpot to the east and neighbouring Mount Chalmers to the south-east

Apart from these protected areas and Seeonee Park, the remaining land use is a mixture of rural residential housing and undeveloped land.

== Demographics ==
In the 2016 census, Limestone Creek had a population of 186 people.

In the 2021 census, Limestone Creek had a population of 179 people.

== Education ==
There are no schools in Limestone Creek. The nearest government primary school is Parkhurst State School in neighbouring Parkhurst, Rockhampton, to the east. The nearest government secondary school is Glenmore State High School in Kawana, Rockhampton, to the south-east. There are also numerous non-government schools in Rockhampton and its suburbs.
