= Ridgelands, Queensland =

Ridgelands
- Suburb
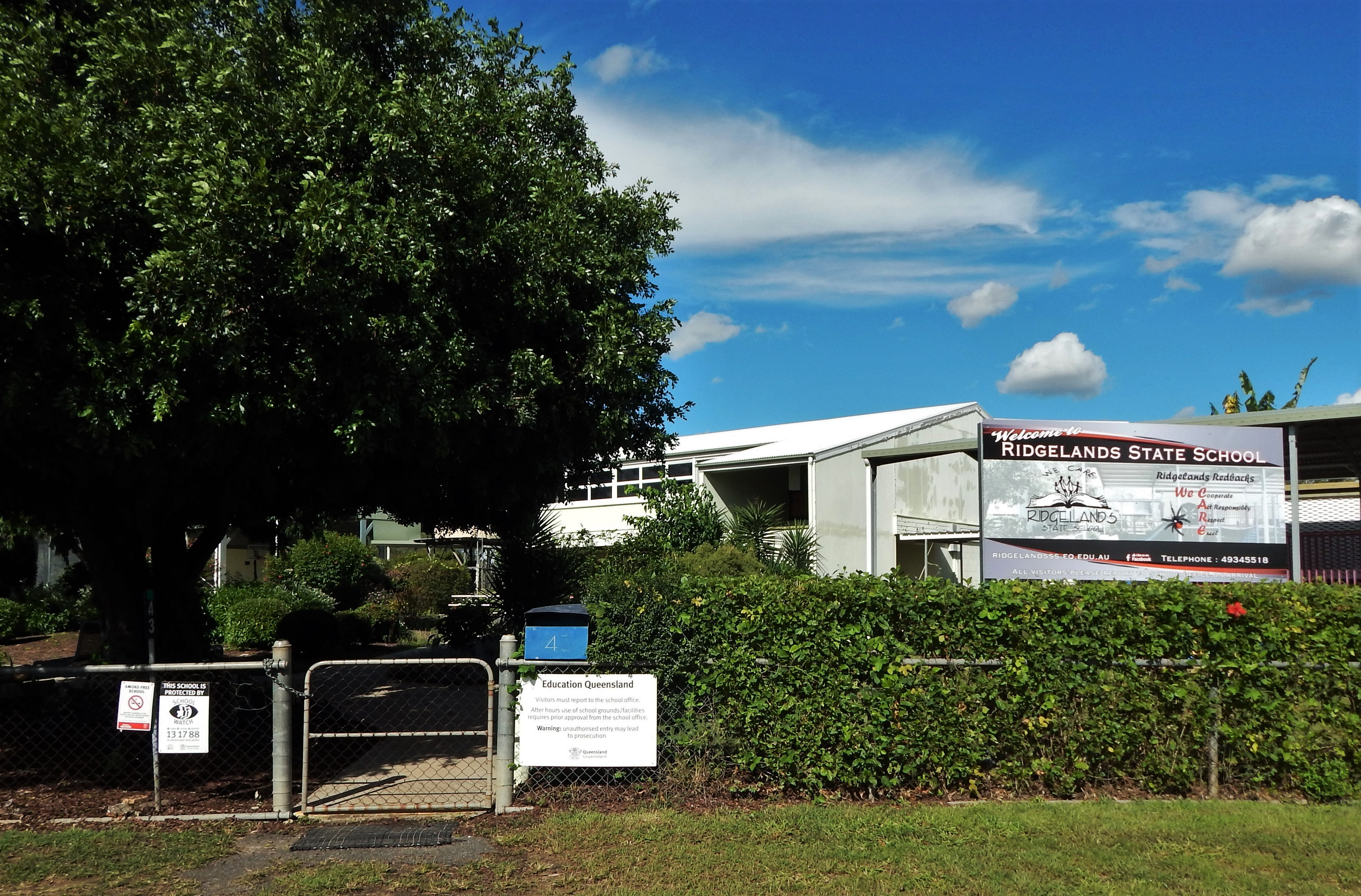
- Ridgelands State School, 2022

- Interactive map of Ridgelands
- Coordinates: 23.2788°S 150.2597°E
- Country: Australia
- State: Queensland
- LGA: Rockhampton Region
- Location: 29.9 km (18.6 mi) NW of Rockhampton CBD; 663 km (412 mi) NNW of Brisbane

Government
  - State electorate: Mirani
  - Federal division: Flynn

Area
  - Total: 112.4 km^{2} (43.4 sq mi)

Population
  - Total: 195 (2021 census)
  - Density: 1.735/km^{2} (4.493/sq mi)
- Time zone: UTC+10:00 (AEST)
- Postcode: 4702
Suburbs around Ridgelands
Morinish	Garnant	South Yaamba
Morinish	Ridgelands	South Yaamba
Dalma	Alton Downs	Alton Downs

Ridgelands is a rural locality in the Rockhampton Region, Queensland, Australia. In the 2021 census, Ridgelands had a population of 195 people.

== History ==
Ridgelands Provisional School opened on 12 October 1921. On 1 July 1924 it became Ridgelands State School. On 26 August 1924 it was renamed Calmorin State School. In 1925 it closed, but reopened on 29 January 1935. It closed on 31 December 1963.

Faraday State School began in temporary accommodation at Ridgelands Hall on 28 July 1922 but opened in its own building on 2 September 1922. It closed in 1928 but reopened in 1931 and closed again in 1932. In 1939 it reopened but was relocated and renamed Ridgelands State School.

== Demographics ==
In the 2016 census, Ridgelands had a population of 166 people.

In the 2021 census, Ridgelands had a population of 195 people.

== Education ==
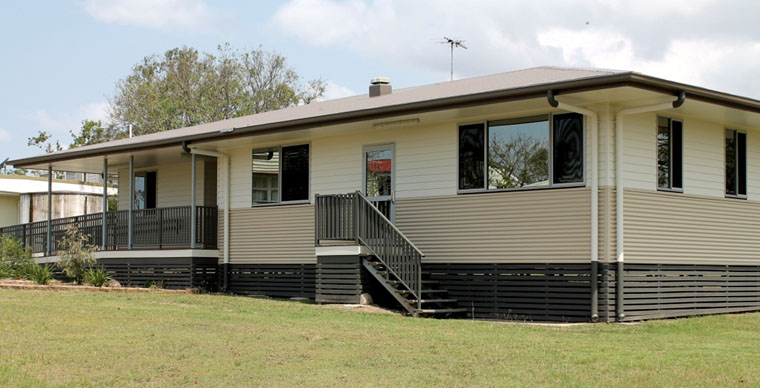
Ridgelands State School library, 2025

Ridgelands State School is a government primary (Prep-6) school for boys and girls at 43 Dalma-Ridgelands Road (23.2497°S 150.2799°E). In 2018, the school had an enrolment of 33 students with 4 teachers (3 full-time equivalent) and 6 non-teaching staff (3 full-time equivalent).

The nearest government secondary schools is Rockhampton State High School in Wandal, Rockhampton, to the south-east.

== Community groups ==
The Ridgelands branch of the Queensland Country Women's Association meets at CWA Hall at 39 Dalma Ridgelands Road.

== Events ==
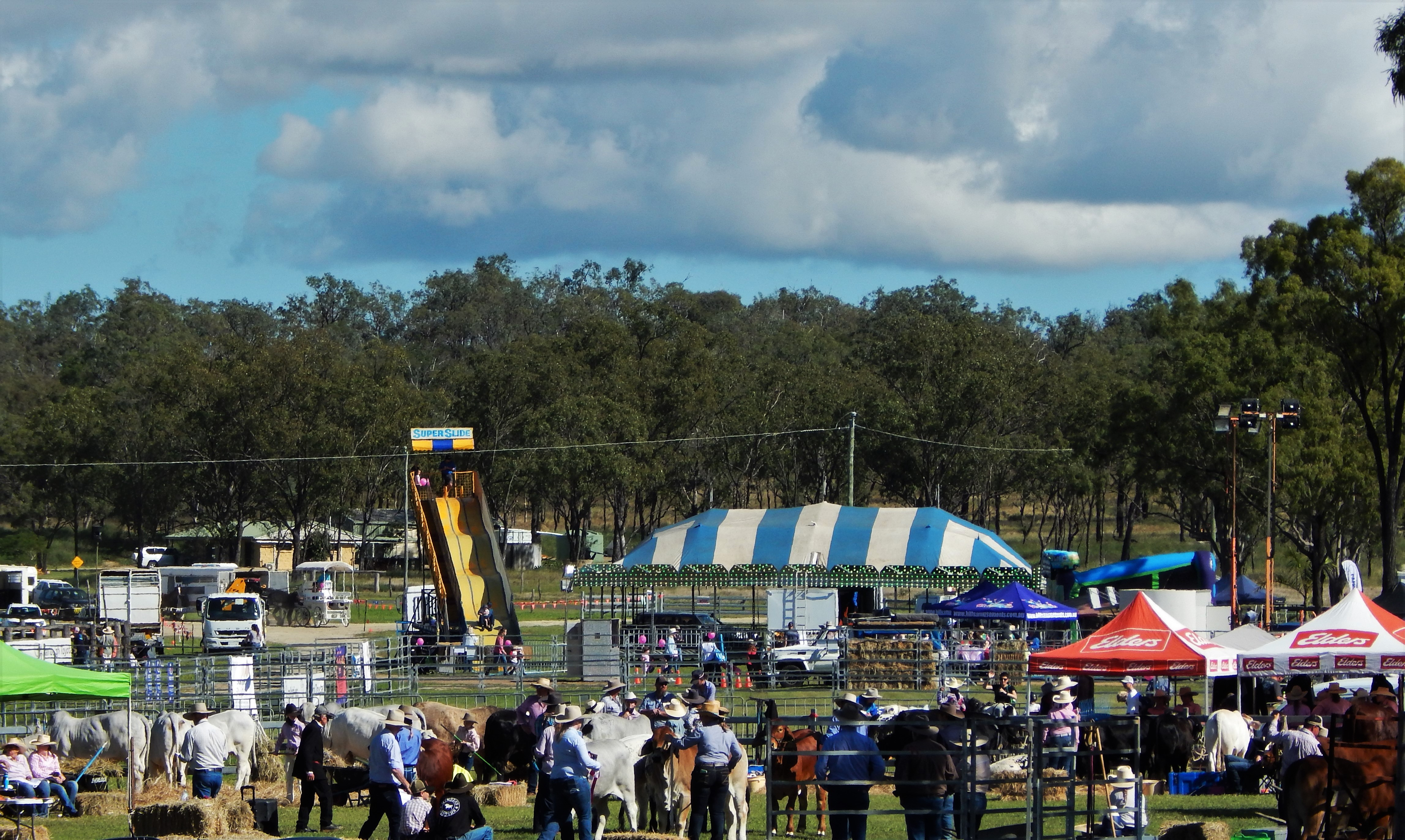
Ridgelands Agricultural Show, 2022

Ridgelands hosts an annual one-day agricultural show each June which is held at the Ridgelands Showgrounds. Concerts and other events are occasionally held at the Ridgelands Hall. Australian musician Fanny Lumsden performed at the hall in August 2021 as part of her "Country Halls tour".
