= Rockyview, Queensland =

Rockyview
- Suburb
- Interactive map of Rockyview
- Coordinates: 23.255°S 150.5208°E
- Country: Australia
- State: Queensland
- LGA: Livingstone Shire
- Location: 17.2 km (10.7 mi) N of Rockhampton CBD; 33.7 km (20.9 mi) SW of Yeppoon; 649 km (403 mi) NNW of Brisbane

Government
  - State electorates: Mirani; Keppel
  - Federal division: Capricornia

Area
  - Total: 30.3 km^{2} (11.7 sq mi)

Population
  - Total: 1,735 (2021 census)
  - Density: 57.26/km^{2} (148.30/sq mi)
- Time zone: UTC+10:00 (AEST)
- Postcode: 4701
Suburbs around Rockyview
Etna Creek	Sandringham	Sandringham
Glenlee	Rockyview	Sandringham
Glenlee	Parkhurst	Limestone Creek

Rockyview is a rural locality in the Livingstone Shire, Queensland, Australia. In the 2021 census, Rockyview had a population of 1,735 people.

== History ==
=== 2019 proposal to transfer the locality to the Rockhampton Region ===
In 2019, a proposal was put forward that the localities of Glenlee, Rockyview and Glendale (all within the Shire of Livingstone) should become part of the Rockhampton Region. The main rationales for the change were that these localities lay in the path of suburban growth to the north of Rockhampton and that the residents of these localities used the services and facilities within the Rockhampton Region rather than those of the Shire of Livingstone. The proposal highlighted the different planning priorities between the two local governments with Rockhampton Region wishing to develop more suburban housing and associated amenities with smaller land parcels, while the Shire of Livingstone preferred to have larger land parcels to retain its rural and rural residential character. Given the unpopularity of the forced 2008 amalgamation, there was suspicion among shire residents that the proposal was another attempt to achieve amalgamation through progressive loss of localities to the Rockhampton Region. Following a number of investigations and public consultations, it was decided in October 2022 not to change the local government boundaries.

In 2025, Dick Olive Park was upgraded with the installation of a new inclusive playground and a shaded picnic area after Livingstone Shire Council received feedback during consultation with local residents in 2023.

== Demographics ==
In the 2016 census, Rockyview had a population of 1,622 people.

In the 2021 census, Rockyview had a population of 1,735 people.

== Education ==
There are no schools in Rockyview. The nearest government primary schools are Parkhurst State School in neighbouring Parkhurst, Rockhampton, to the south and The Caves State School in The Caves to the north-west. The nearest government secondary school is Glenmore State High School in Kawana, Rockhampton, to the south.

== Amenities ==
There are a number of parks in the area:

- Olive Park (23.2502°S 150.5078°E)
- George Olive Park (23.2516°S 150.5114°E)
- Dick Olive Park (23.2648°S 150.5107°E)
