= Parkhurst Town Centre =

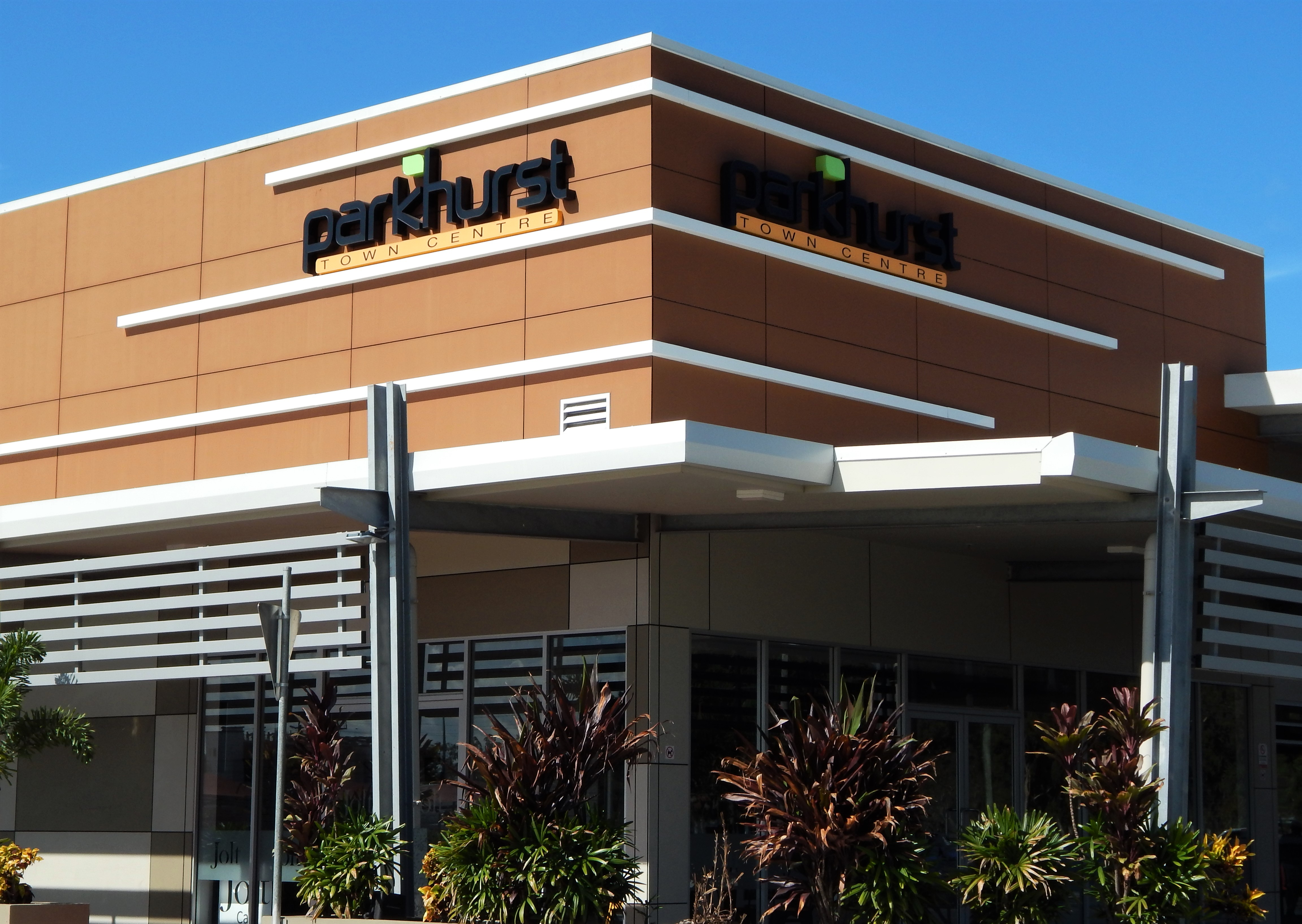
- The south-west corner of the centre
- Location: Rockhampton, Queensland, Australia
- Coordinates: 23°18′17″S 150°30′57″E
- Address: 812-818 Yaamba Road, Parkhurst QLD 4702
- Opened: 15 November 2016; 10 years ago
- Owner: AHC Limited
- Num. of stores: 35
- Num. of anchor tenants: 1
- Floor area: 8,500 m^{2} (91,493 sq ft)
- Floors: 1
- Parking: 420 Bays
- Website: www.ahc.com.au/commercial/parkhurst-town-centre

Parkhurst Town Centre is a shopping centre located on the corner of the Yaamba Road and Boundary Road in Parkhurst, a suburb on the northern outskirts of Rockhampton, Queensland, Australia.

Being Parkhurst's first major commercial retail precinct, the opening of the Woolworths-anchored shopping centre in 2016 is arguably most notable for denoting the rapid residential development of Parkhurst which was until the turn of the century an entirely separate rural locality rather than a northern suburb of the city as it is now.

== History ==
A shopping centre in Parkhurst was first mooted in the 2000s. As Parkhurst and the surrounding area grew throughout the 1990s and 2000s with the development of multiple new large housing estates, a shopping centre increasingly became a necessity for the area.

In 2009, Crown Property Group confirmed it intended to proceed with plans to build the centre on the site of a former caravan park. At the time, Woolworths stated that they had not decided whether to be a part of the development.

In 2011, as developers sought approval to build the centre, the proposed shopping complex received support from local residents and from nearby businesses including the Parkhurst Tavern.

Due to Cyclone Marcia in 2015 approvals for the construction of the complex were delayed. However, land clearing of the old caravan park site commenced in December 2014 with construction commencing in March 2016.

The managing director of the company stated at the time that all hardware and construction items would be supplied from local businesses, with the construction creating over 150 jobs and 200 jobs when completed.

At the time construction began, it was predicted the shopping centre would meet the needs of 14,000 residents in Parkhurst and surrounding suburbs.

It was announced in June 2016 that the construction of the Woolworths store had been completed and the work on the entire shopping centre was ahead of schedule and that centre was expected to be open in November 2016.

Woolworths was the first store to open in the centre, being officially opened at 5pm on 14 November 2016. The official opening of the new Woolworths supermarket was attended by Federal MP Michelle Landry, State MP Brittany Lauga and Rockhampton mayor Margaret Strelow.

The centre held a "grand opening" promotional event on Saturday 19 November 2016 which incorporated a Sea FM outside broadcast and novelty children's amusements such as a petting zoo, face painting and balloon creations.

AHC Limited reported in 2018 that more than 22,000 people were entering the shopping centre each week.

Since opening in 2016, numerous tenants have opened shops and offices at the centre.

Woolworths simultaneously opened with a bottle shop, sushi shop, a hairdressing salon, a massage therapist, a nail salon and a medical centre. In the ensuing years, numerous additional tenants have leased space at the centre for various shops, offices and services. These include a petrol station which was constructed on the site, as well as a butchery, a newsagency, a bakery, a coffee shop, a kebab shop, a national discount retailer, a ladies fashion boutique, a national craft retailer, a pizza and pasta shop, a pilates studio, an accounting firm and an inductions office for a local mining group.

The first multinational fast food restaurant opened in Parkhurst in November 2022 following the construction of a brand new KFC outlet at the Parkhurst Town Centre.

In 2020, businesses operators within the Parkhurst Town Centre expressed frustration at the ongoing roadworks in front of the centre associated with the Rockhampton Northern Access Upgrade which saw the duplication of 5.4 kilometres of the Bruce Highway.

Upon the completion of the Rockhampton Ring Road which will bypass the city of Rockhampton, the Parkhurst Town Centre is expected to become the final opportunity for southbound motorists to access a commercial retail complex to buy fuel, takeaway food and groceries before entering the ring road, without having to travel into the city.

=== Retail crime ===
Since opening in 2016, the centre has experienced retail crime such as shoplifting.

Data released by the Queensland Police Service in 2022 showed that in the previous twelve months, there was a cluster of 45 offences at the shopping centre, which included 36 theft-related offences, four fraud-related offences, one trespass offence and two property damage offences.

In 2023, a 22-year-old man pleaded guilty to a count of wilful damage in the Rockhampton Magistrates Court for attacking a set of automatic doors at the shopping centre when they did not open. A conviction was recorded and he was ordered to pay $350 to AHC Limited.

In an incident in January 2024, a 47-year-old man stole two skill tester machines from the shopping centre, breaking off the padlocks and attempting to break into the cash containers to retrieve cash to feed his meth addiction, with the magistrate noting the incident at the Parkhurst Town Centre was indicative of how desperate he was to feed his addiction.
