= South Yaamba, Queensland =

South Yaamba
- Suburb
- Interactive map of South Yaamba
- Coordinates: 23.2113°S 150.3375°E
- Country: Australia
- State: Queensland
- LGA: Rockhampton Region
- Location: 27.2 km (16.9 mi) NW of Rockhampton CBD; 671 km (417 mi) NNW of Brisbane

Government
  - State electorate: Mirani
  - Federal division: Flynn

Area
  - Total: 100.5 km^{2} (38.8 sq mi)

Population
  - Total: 79 (2021 census)
  - Density: 0.786/km^{2} (2.036/sq mi)
- Time zone: UTC+10:00 (AEST)
- Postcode: 4702
Suburbs around South Yaamba
Yaamba	Yaamba	Yaamba
Garnant	South Yaamba	Etna Creek
Ridgelands	Ridgelands	Alton Downs

South Yaamba is a rural locality in the Rockhampton Region, Queensland, Australia. In the 2021 census, South Yaamba had a population of 79 people.

== Geography ==
The locality is bounded by the Fitzroy River to the north, north-east, and east.

Despite having the same name, the town of South Yaamba is on the other side of the river in the locality of Etna Creek.

Calmorin is a neighbourhood in the north-west of the locality (23.15°S 150.3166°E).

The land use is mostly grazing on native vegetation with some crop-growing.

== History ==
The locality takes its name from the town of Yaamba, which in turn took its name from the parish, which took its name from the pastoral run, named in 1860s by the pastoralist Peter Fitzallan MacDonald. It is believed to be an Aboriginal word meaning main camping ground.

== Demographics ==
In the 2016 census, South Yaamba had a population of 99 people.

In the 2021 census, South Yaamba had a population of 79 people.

== Education ==
There are no schools in South Yaamba. The nearest government primary school is Ridgelands State School in neighbouring Ridgelands to the south. The nearest government secondary school is Rockhampton State High School in Wandal, Rockhampton.
