= Capricornia Correctional Centre =

Prison in Queensland, Australia

Coordinates: 23.2302°S 150.4715°E

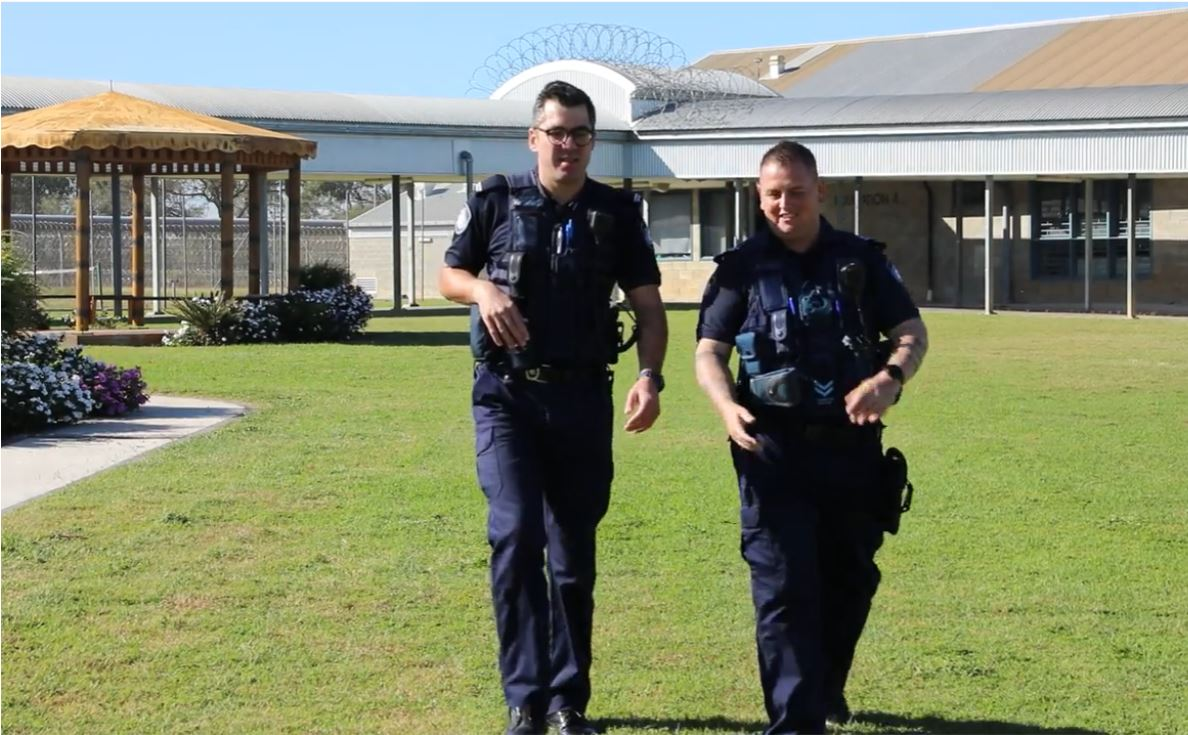
Capricornia Correctional Centre

The Capricornia Correctional Centre is a prison located in Etna Creek in the Shire of Livingstone, Queensland, Australia. It services mainly the Rockhampton and Central Queensland areas. It is a high and low security facility and can hold around 800 inmates.

Construction of the centre began in August 1999, and it was officially opened on 12 September 2001. The centre replaced the Rockhampton Correctional Centre (also known as Etna Creek Prison), which had been built in 1969. A portion of the RCC was incorporated into the new prison, which was built on a site adjacent.
