= Annie Wheeler =

(1867–1950) soldiers' welfare worker

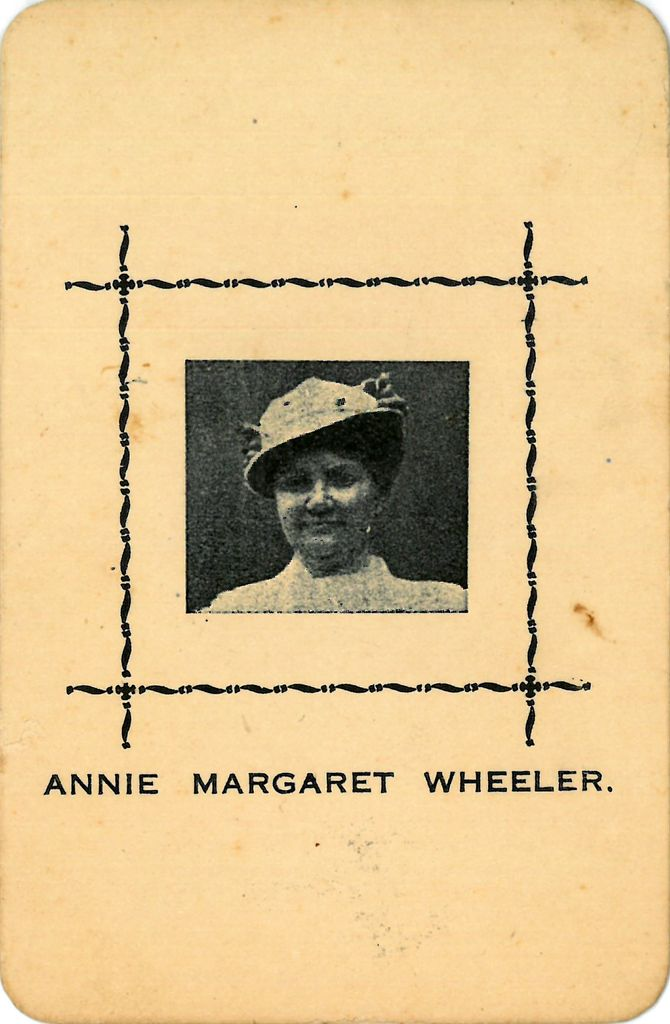
Annie Margaret Wheeler, c1918 to 1921

Annie Margaret Wheeler OBE (née Laurie; 1867–1950) was an Australian volunteer welfare worker who assisted soldiers from Central Queensland during World War I. She maintained a detailed card index of all soldiers from Central Queensland so that mail and parcels from their families could reach them and she provided practical and financial assistance to soldiers who were wounded, on leave in England or needing assistance with the army's bureaucracy. She was nicknamed "Mother of the Queenslanders" and "Mother of Anzacs".

== Early life ==
Annie Margaret Laurie was born on 10 December 1867 at Saunders Station, Dingo, Queensland, the eldest surviving child of grazier Alexander Stuart Somerville Laurie and his wife Margaret (née Stevenson). She attended Springsure State School. She was educated in a Rockhampton convent school and received some nursing training at Sydney Hospital after which she worked as a private nurse in Rockhampton. On 24 February 1896, she married Henry Gaudiano Wheeler of Cooroorah Station, near Blackwater, at St Paul's Cathedral in Rockhampton. Their daughter, Portia Jean, was born in 1897, but her husband died in 1903. Following his death, she returned to Rockhampton where she took over the Criterion Hotel. In March 1913, she went to England to visit relations and to complete Portia's education.

== World War I ==
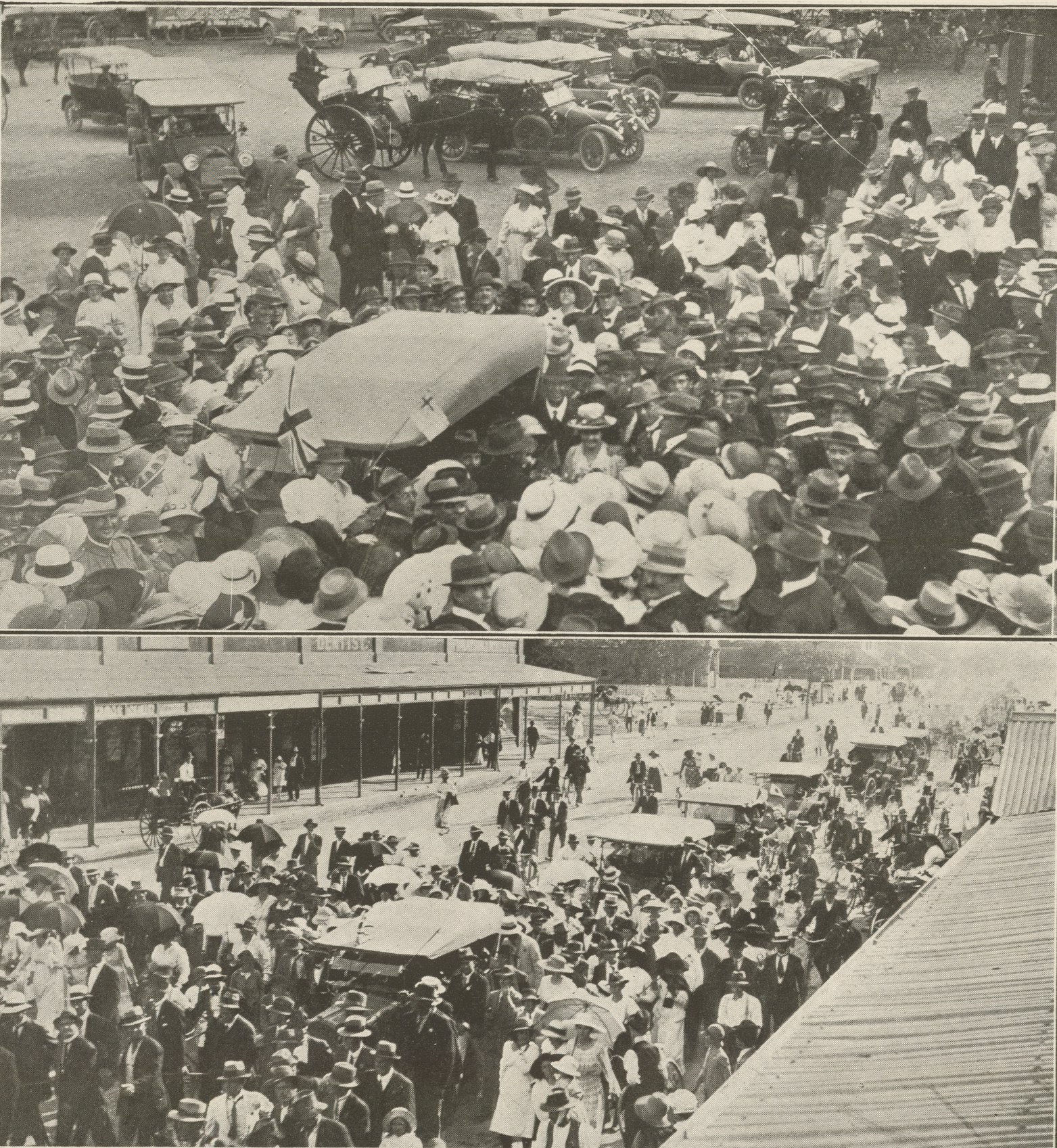
A hero's welcome for Annie Wheeler on her return to Rockhampton, November 1919

At the outset of World War I, she took up residence in London, near the Australian Army Headquarters and the Anzac Buffet. From this base, Mrs Wheeler endeavoured to contact all soldiers from Central Queensland, whether they were wounded, imprisoned, or in the trenches. She kept a detailed card index on them, corresponded with servicemen on the battlefield, forwarded packages and mail, provided for their needs and supervised the care and comfort of those in hospital. For soldiers on furlough, she supplemented restricted allowances and advanced funds when they experienced bureaucratic delays. To them, she became known as the "Mother of the Queenslanders". Families in Queensland sent letters and parcels through her; this was the only mail many diggers received. By 1918 over 2300 men were on her books. One of those she assisted was Jack Fryer who wrote to his sister saying:

"Went to see Mrs Wheeler this morning. She was jolly glad to see some of us Rockhampton boys. By jove! She is a great little woman. I think the name 'Mother of Anzacs' suits her to a T."

Annie Wheeler's support for families back in Queensland is illustrated by Jack Fryer being wounded by a grenade in early August 1918. Annie Wheeler sent a telegram to his family on 15 August saying "Jack writes hospital France wounds improving", which arrived 6 days before the official army telegram stating "Now reported Lieut. John Fryer admitted 6 August Second British Red Cross Hospital, England. Multiple gunshot wounds. Severe."

Each fortnight Mrs Wheeler sent home detailed letters which were published in The Capricornian and The Morning Bulletin. Initially she provided financial assistance from her own resources, but later a special fund to support her work was established at Rockhampton. Early in 1918, when she experienced poor health, Nurse May MacDonald was sent from Rockhampton to assist her.

== After the war ==
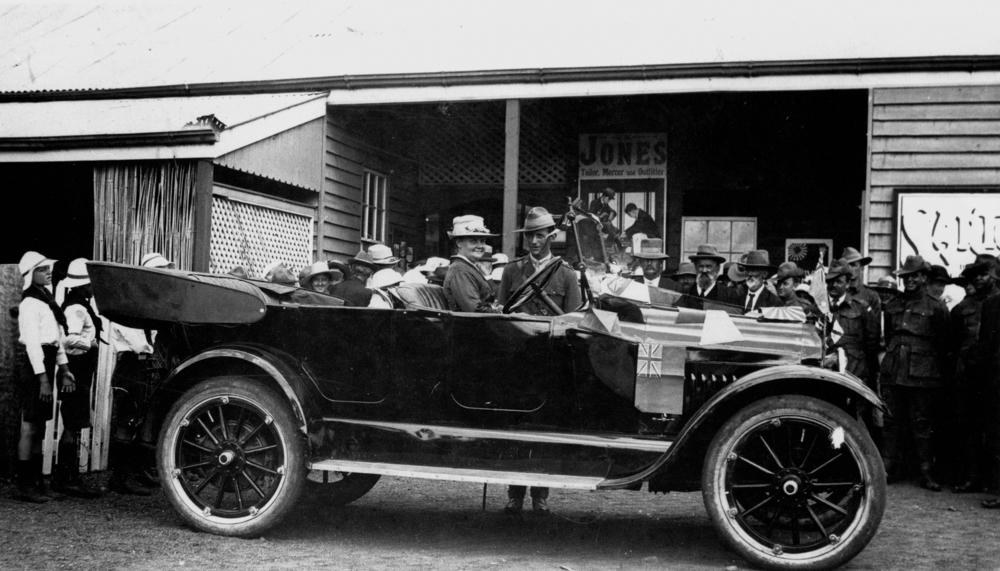
Arrival of Mrs Wheeler to unveil the Springsure School War Memorial Fountain, 1919

The Australian Government provided a free passage for Annie Wheeler's return in November 1919. Rockhampton accorded her a hero's welcome; over 5000 people met her train and cheering soldiers towed her car through the streets to a public reception with further functions in other towns. On 6 December 1919, Annie Wheeler returned to Springsure State School to unveil the memorial fountain honouring the former pupils of the school who served in the war. The list included Mrs Wheeler and Nurse Squires. M.M. Kavanaugh, the chairman of Bauhinia Shire, presented Mrs Wheeler with an electroplated tea and coffee service for her untiring work for the soldiers of their district. Jack Fryer formed part of the honour guard at the unveiling.

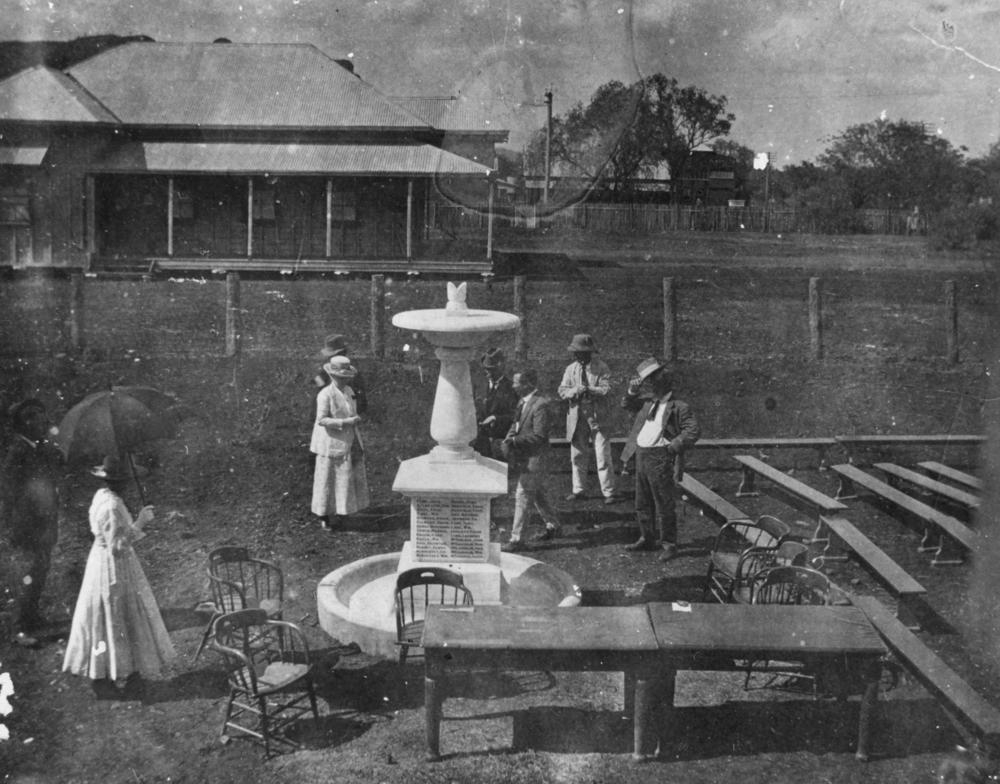
Unveiling the War Memorial fountain in Springsure State School, 6 December 1919

On 19 October 1920, Annie Wheeler was awarded an O.B.E. for "comforts and entertainments for the troops".

== Later life ==
Annie Wheeler died in Brisbane on 23 October 1950 and was cremated at Mt Thompson Crematorium on 25 October 1950. Her memorial at the crematorium has the words " She lived not unto herself".

== Legacy ==
The State Library of Queensland holds Annie Wheeler's index of several thousand cards, shedding light on the details of Queensland's World War I servicemen.
