= Parkhurst, Queensland =

Parkhurst
- Suburb
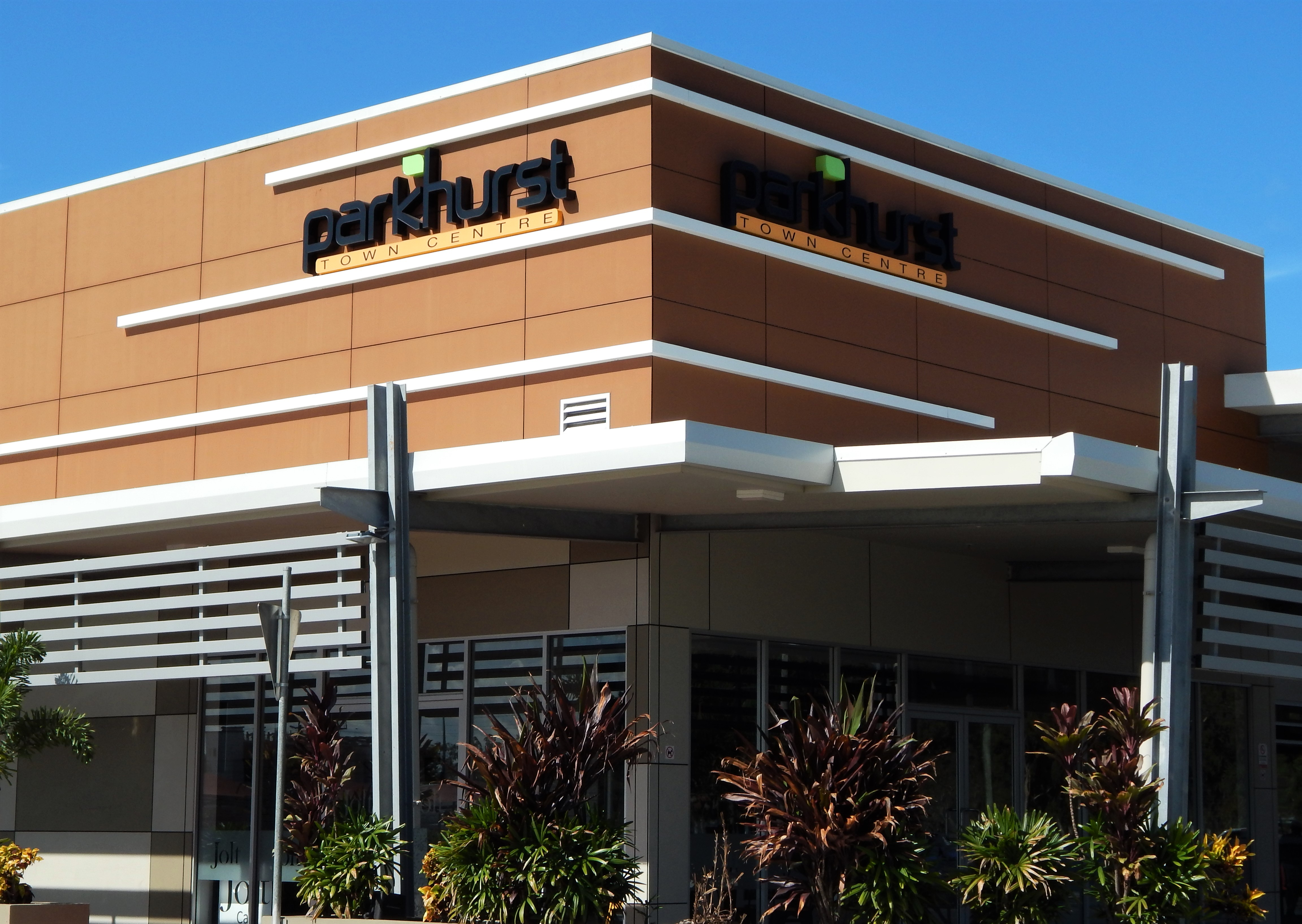
- Parkhurst Town Centre shopping complex, 2020

- Interactive map of Parkhurst
- Coordinates: 23.3075°S 150.5058°E
- Country: Australia
- State: Queensland
- City: Rockhampton
- LGA: Rockhampton Region
- Location: 9.4 km (5.8 mi) N of Rockhampton CBD; 623 km (387 mi) NNW of Brisbane

Government
  - State electorates: Rockhampton; Keppel
  - Federal division: Capricornia

Area
  - Total: 20.6 km^{2} (8.0 sq mi)

Population
  - Total: 3,043 (2021 census)
  - Density: 147.7/km^{2} (382.6/sq mi)
- Time zone: UTC+10:00 (AEST)
- Postcode: 4702
Suburbs around Parkhurst
Glenlee	Rockyview	Limestone Creek
Glenlee	Parkhurst	Limestone Creek
Pink Lily	Kawana	Norman Gardens

Parkhurst is a northern suburb of Rockhampton in the Rockhampton Region, Queensland, Australia. In the 2021 census, Parkhurst had a population of 3,043 people.

== Geography ==
Parkhurst is bounded to the north by Ramsay Creek and to the west by Ramsay Creek and then the Fitzroy River. To the south it is bounded by Limestone Creek (the creek, not the suburb) and by Rockhampton–Yeppoon Road (also known as the Yeppoon Road).

A section of the Bruce Highway passes through the centre of the suburb from south to north, while the North Coast railway line also passes through the suburb from south to north, to the west of the highway. The proposed Rockhampton Ring Road will pass through Parkhurst on its way to join the Bruce Highway'

The Parkhurst Industrial Estate is in the south-west of the suburb, while the residential land is in the west near the river and in the north-east of the suburb. Most of Parkhurst remains farmland, but Rockhampton's urban sprawl has led to further residential developments being established throughout Parkhurst including the Northridge, Rosedale, Paramount Park, Riverside and Edenbrook estates.

The increasing population at Parkhurst and in areas further north such as Rockyview and Glendale has led to the construction of the Parkhurst Town Centre, a new shopping centre anchored by a Woolworths supermarket. Construction of the centre commenced in August 2015. Woolworths was the first store in open in the centre on 15 November 2016.

The land near the river is prone to flooding. Rockhampton's water treatment facility is located near the river.

== History ==
The Glenmore Homestead is one of the earliest in the Rockhampton area, being established in the late 1850s. Land was opened up for settlement and small farms were established.

Parkhurst Provisional School accepted its first enrolments on 11 June 1900. In 1909, it became Parkhurst State School.

Historically within the Shire of Livingstone, on 1 July 1984, Parkhurst was transferred to the City of Rockhampton where Rochampton's new water treatment facility was being constructed.

== Demographics ==
In the 2011 census, Parkhurst had a population of 1,385 people.

In the 2016 census, Parkhurst had a population of 2,476 people.

In the 2021 census, Parkhurst had a population of 3,043 people.

== Heritage listings ==
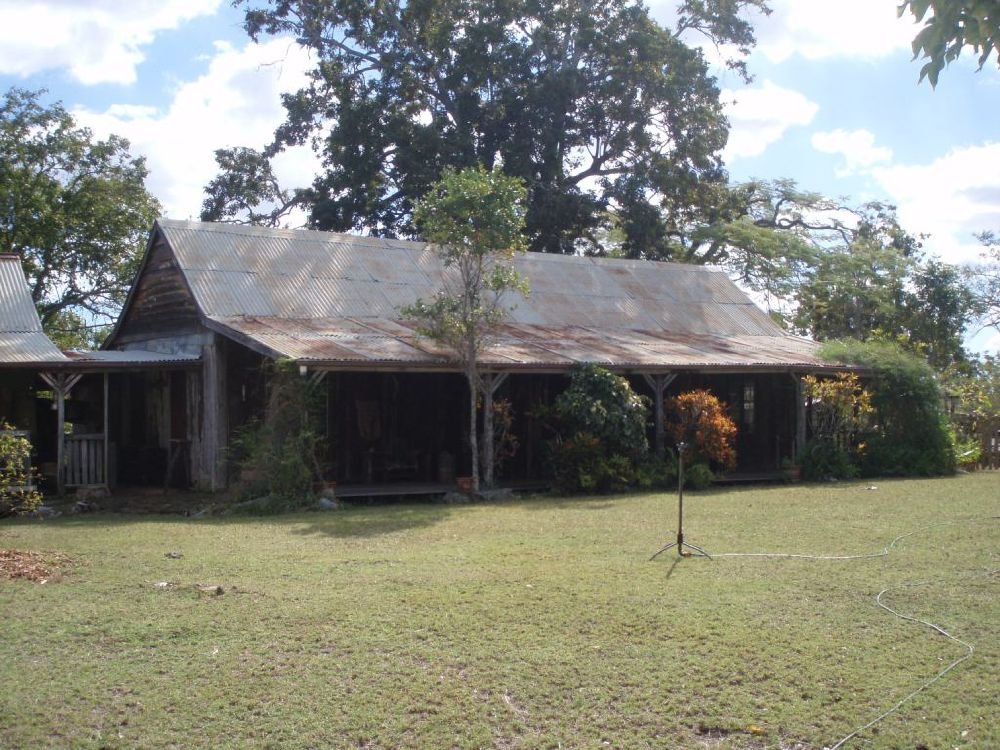
Glenmore Homestead, 2009

Parkhurst has a number of heritage-listed sites, including:

- Glenmore Homestead, Belmont Road

== Education ==
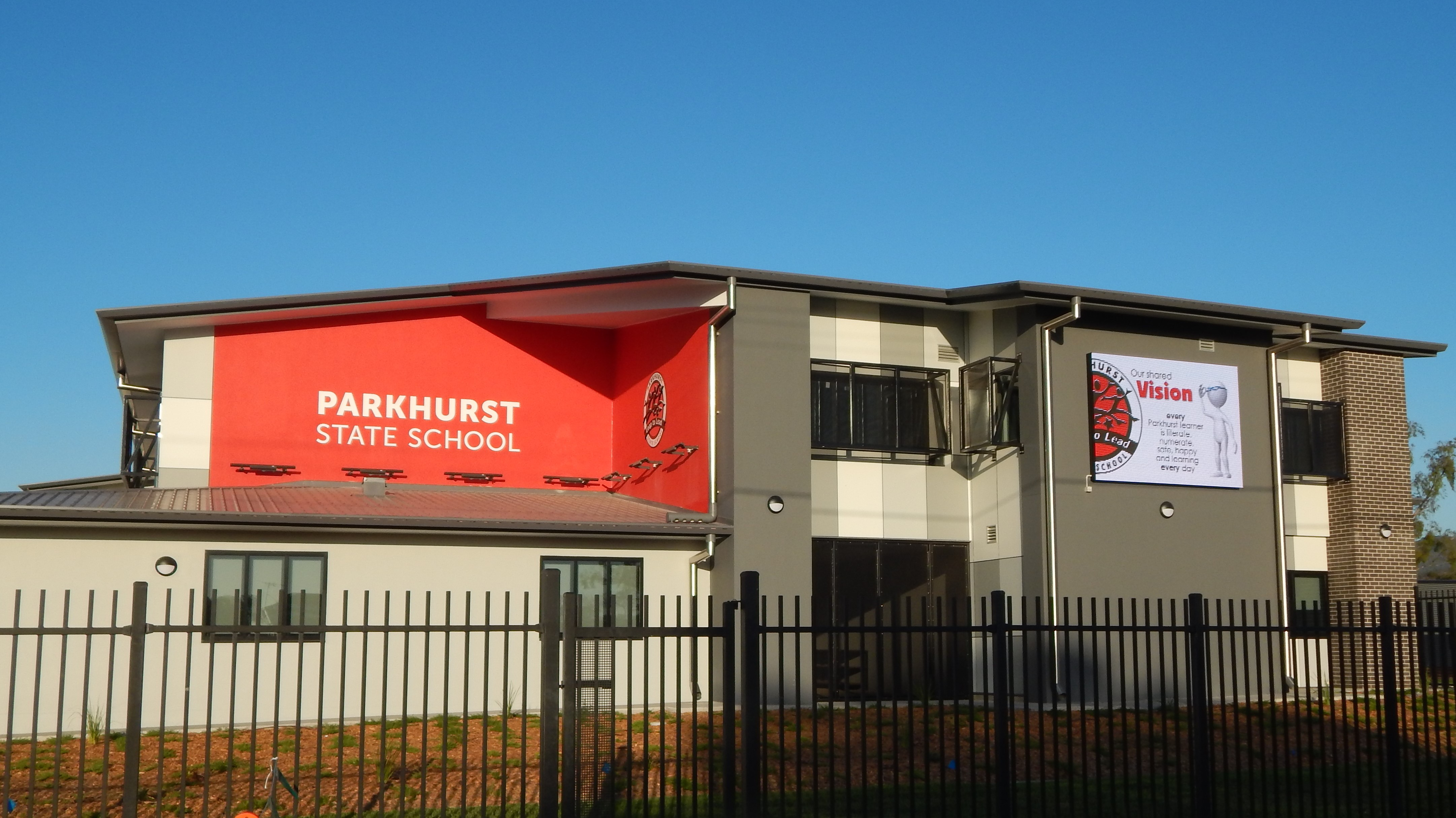
Parkhurst State School, 2021

Parkhurst State School is a government primary (Prep-6) school for boys and girls at 11 Mason Avenue (23.2958°S 150.5137°E).

The school opened on 11 June 1900 with William George Pardy appointed as the school's first principal. By the end of 1900, the school had an enrolment of 37 students.

By 1920, the Church of England was preparing to build an orphanage opposite the Parkhurst Railway Station which would guarantee an increase in enrolments at Parkhurst State School. In May 1922, there were 52 students at the school with a further 25 expected to be enrolled upon the opening of St George's Orphanage in August 1922. A new school building was built to accommodate the increased enrolments and was opened in 1924.

In 1940, there were approximately 130 students at the school, with 90 of those coming from St George's Orphanage.

During the second world war, around 45,000 American soldiers camped around Parkhurst where they commandeered St George's Orphanage with the children there being relocated to Yeppoon. This caused the enrolments at Parkhurst State School to decrease significantly, dropping to around 40. During the war, air raid trenches were dug in a zig zag pattern at the back of the school and students practiced air raid drills. At the conclusion of the war, children returned to St George's Orphanage and the school's enrolments increased again.

Throughout the 1960's, the school's student population began to diversify with the opening of a local cement works in 1960, the commencement of bus transport from The Caves and the opening of the Capricorn Correctional Centre in 1969.

However, St George's Orphanage became a home just for boys in 1971 causing the school's enrolments to decrease, which dropped further when the orphanage stopped taking in children in 1976, with the remaining boys relocated to other local homes in the area in 1978.

However, enrolments had increased to 60 students by 1987 with children from the two large caravan parks making up 80% of the school's population. A pre-school opened in 1985.

In May 1999, a new $70,000 multi-purpose sports court was officially opened at the school.

Parkhurst State School celebrated its centenary in 2000.

A new $2 million building dubbed "Zone 21" comprising a library, computer area, theatre and seminar room was officially opened in June 2010.

In 2014, the school had an enrolment of 308 students with 25 teachers (21 full-time equivalent). At that time, approximately half the children lived outside the suburb and came by school bus from the more rural areas to the north.

In 2018, the school had an enrolment of 404 students with 28 teachers (27 full-time equivalent) and 22 non-teaching staff (14 full-time equivalent). It includes a special education program.

A new $8.5 million two-storey building dubbed the "learning loft" which was constructed during the COVID-19 pandemic opened in November 2021. Following this, a new $6 million administration building and tuckshop was constructed at the school which was completed in 2023.

In August 2025, Parkhurst State School celebrated its 125th anniversary. As of 2025, there are 430 students enrolled at the school in 18 classes.

There are no secondary schools in Parkhurst. The nearest government secondary school is Glenmore State High School in neighbouring Kawana to the south.

== Amenities ==
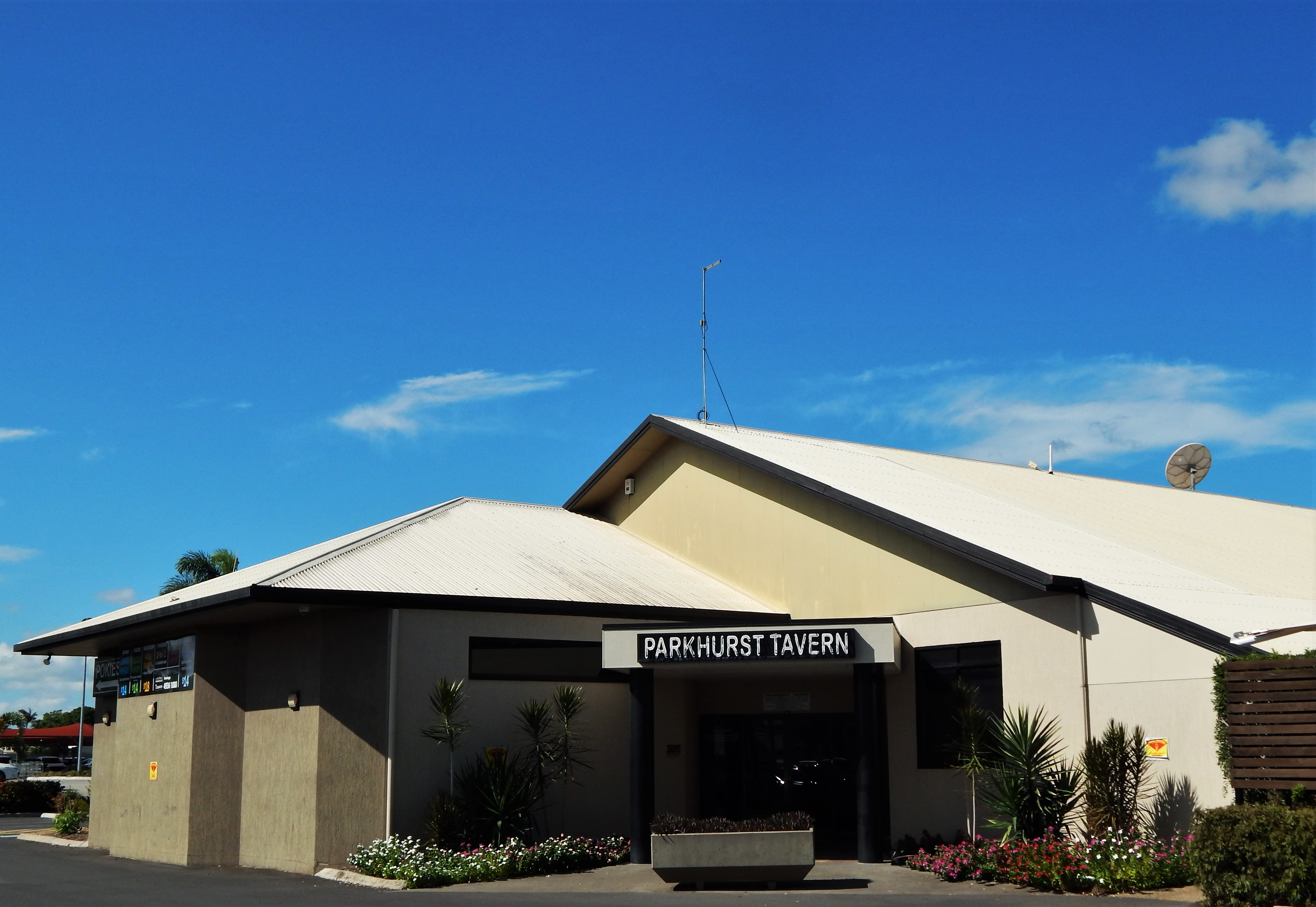
Parkhurst Tavern, 2020

Parkhurst Early Learning Centre is a child care centre and kindergarten in Bean Street established in 1995. It also provides before-school care, after-school care, and vacation care.

There are a number of parks in the area:

- Alexandra Street Park (23.3268°S 150.4972°E)
- Bill Neven Park (23.3018°S 150.5170°E)
- Boundary Road Park (23.3065°S 150.5182°E)
- John Hegvold Park (23.3013°S 150.5170°E)
- Joseph Harrison Park (23.2943°S 150.5154°E)
- Nuttall Street (23.3184°S 150.5142°E)
- Parkhurst Tennis Club (23.2982°S 150.5132°E)
- Ramsay Creek Park (23.2860°S 150.5076°E)
- Thomas Hilcher Park (23.3136°S 150.4870°E)
- Wade Street Park (23.3242°S 150.4948°E)

== Attractions ==
Parkhurst is home to the Rockhampton Heritage Village. Located at 296 Boundary Road, this open air museum showcases a range of historic buildings with exhibitions of artefacts from Rockhampton's history. The museum is a venue for local markets and has a large function venue built in the style of a traditional woolshed.

Limestone Creek Environmental Park offers a range of walking tracks in and around Limestone Creek through an open eucalypt forest where wildlife can be seen. It is popular with bird watchers and photographers.
